= List of municipalities in Quebec =

Location of Quebec in Canada

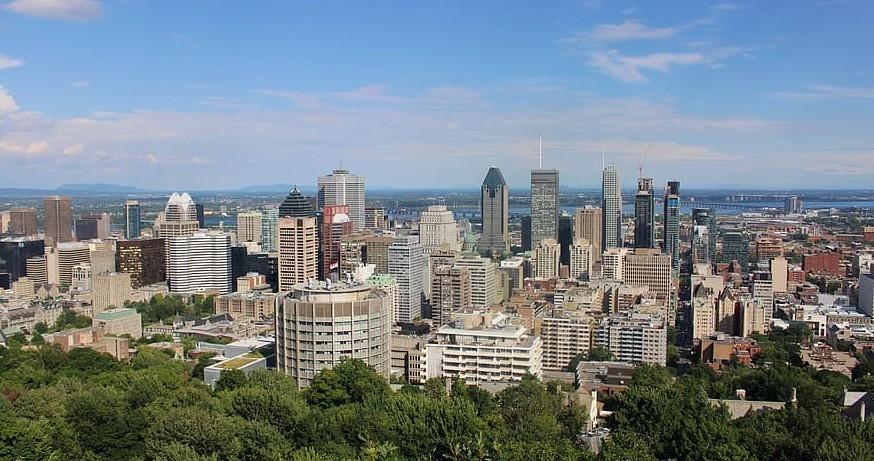
A view of downtown Montreal, Quebec's most populous municipality

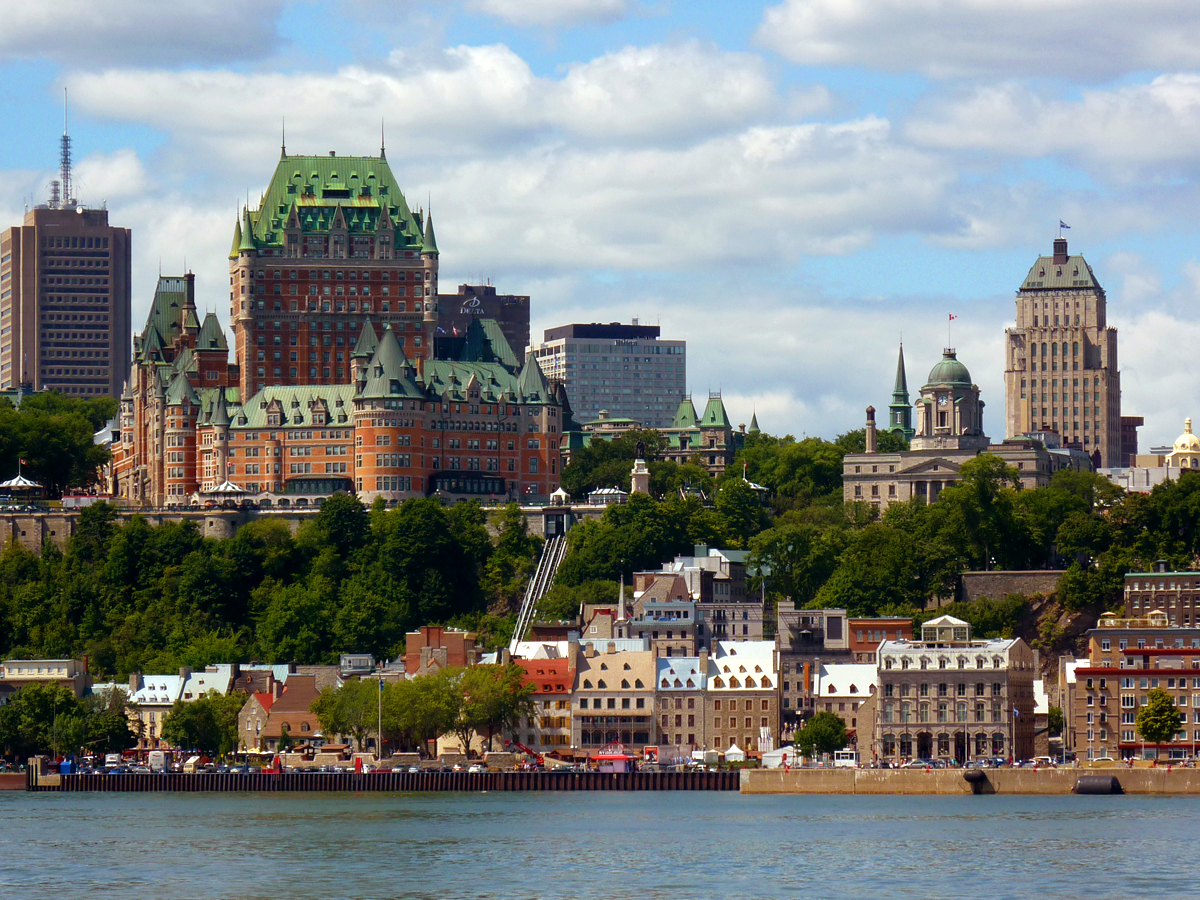
Quebec City, the provincial capital and second-largest municipality in Quebec by population

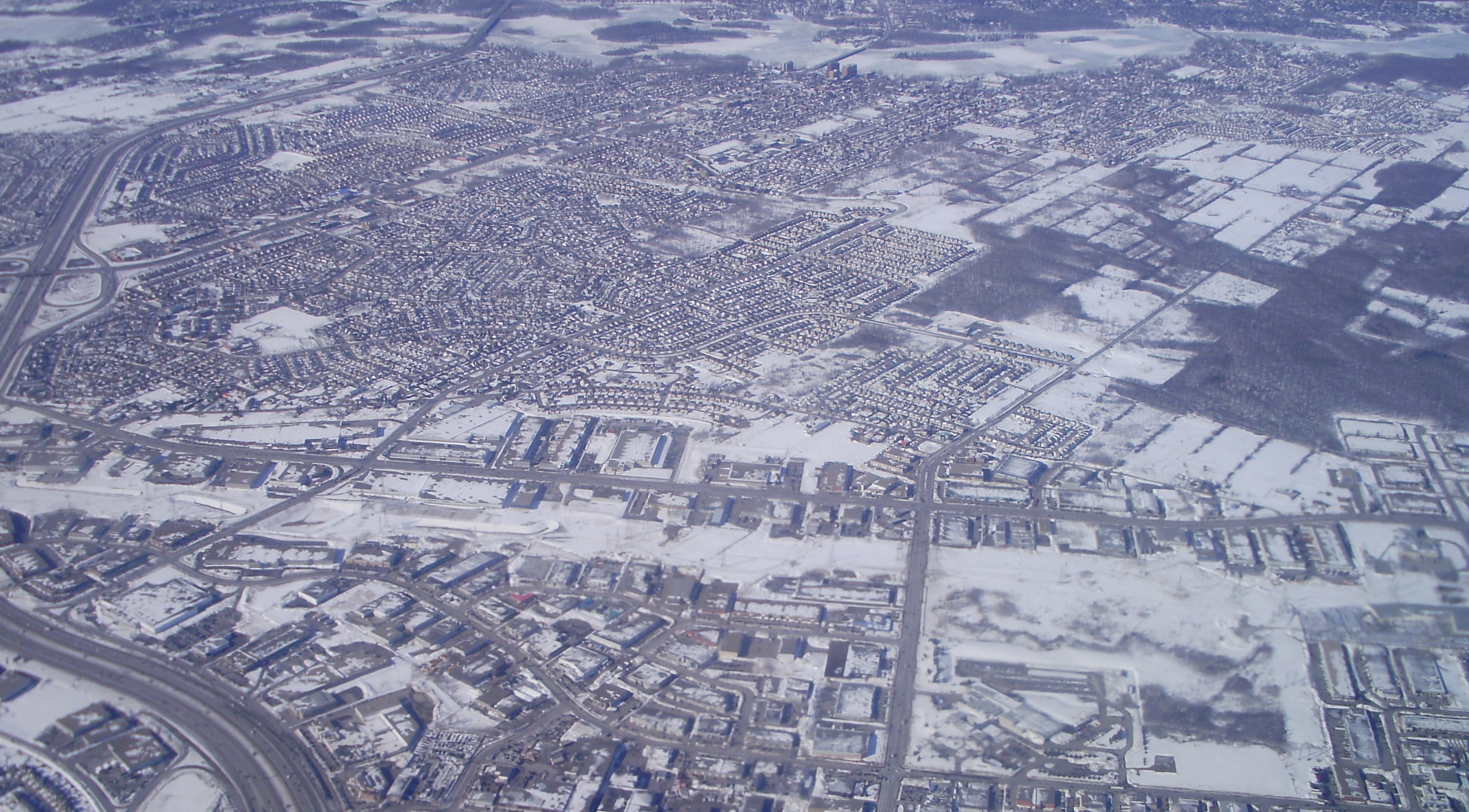
Aerial view of Laval, a suburb of Montreal and Quebec's third-most populous municipality

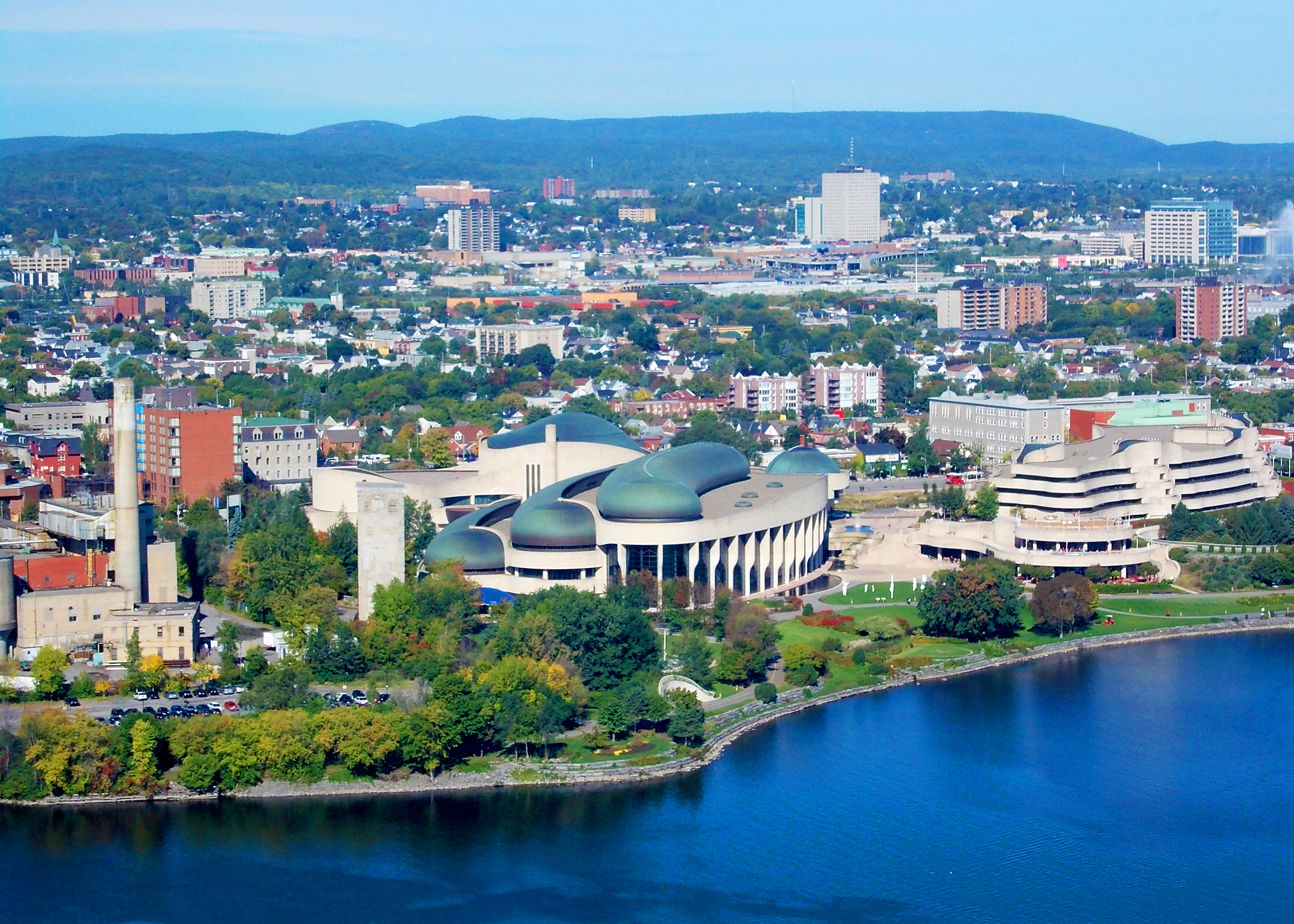
A view of downtown Gatineau, Quebec's fourth-largest municipality by population

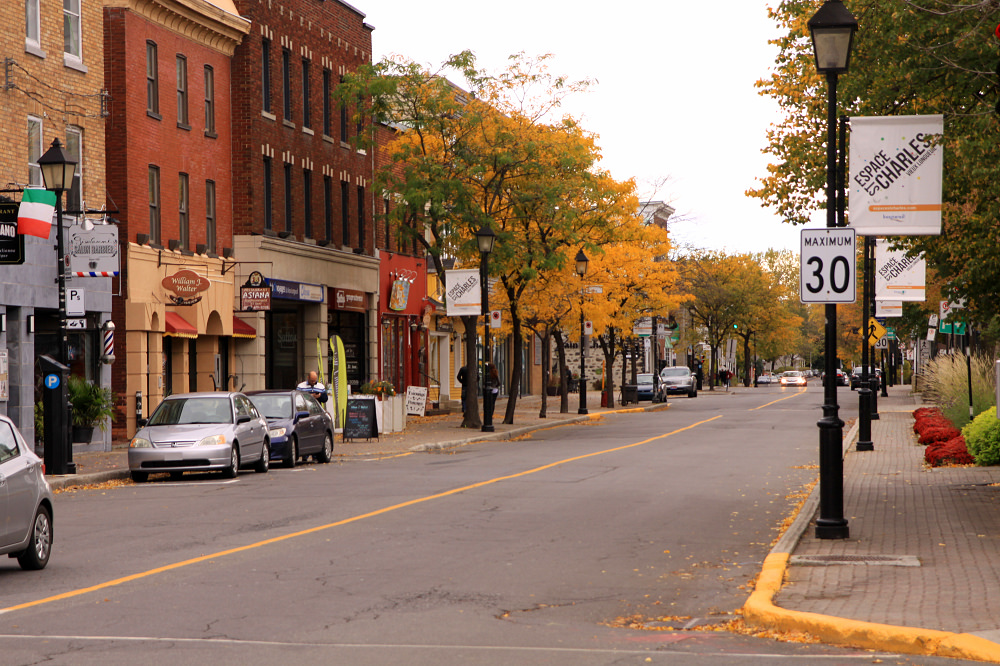
A street in central Longueuil, a suburb of Montreal and Quebec's fifth-largest municipality by population

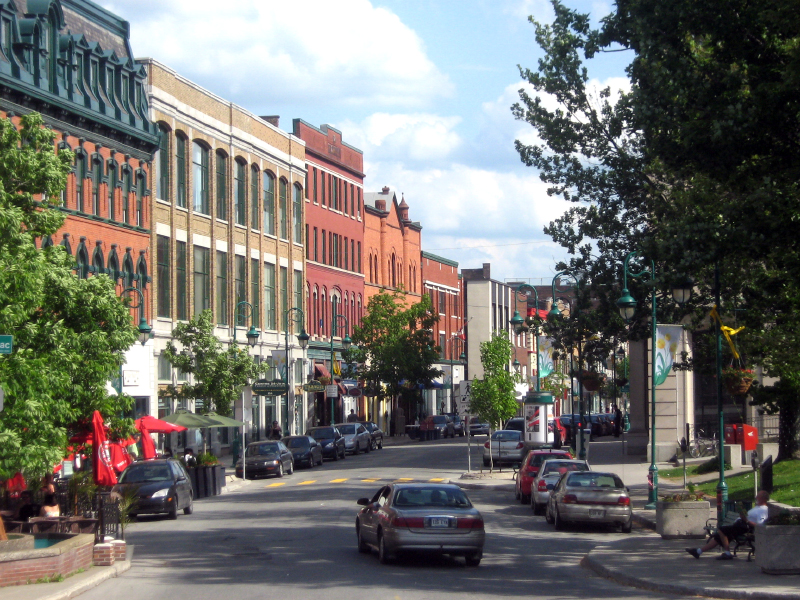
A streetscape in downtown Sherbrooke, Quebec's sixth-most populous municipality

Quebec is the second-most populous province in Canada with 8,501,833 residents as of 2021 and is the largest in land area at 1,298,599.75 km^{2} (501,392.17 mi^{2}). For statistical purposes, the province is divided into 1,282 census subdivisions, which are municipalities and equivalents. Quebec's 1,218 municipalities include 87 regional county municipalities at the supralocal level and 1,131 local municipalities (88.2% of its census subdivisions). Generally, most local municipalities, as well as some unorganized territories, are nested within regional county municipalities. The 1,218 municipalities are directly responsible for the provision of public transit, fire protection, potable water, water purification, and waste management services to its residents. They also share responsibility with the province in the provision of housing, road networks, police protection, recreation and culture, parks and natural spaces, and land use planning and development.

Below the regional county municipality level, the Government of Quebec's Ministry of Municipal Affairs and Housing recognizes 10 types of local municipalities – cities, towns, village municipalities, parish municipalities, township municipalities, united township municipalities, Cree village municipalities, Naskapi village municipalities, northern village municipalities, and simply "municipalities". Cities and towns are legislated primarily by the Loi sur les cités et villes (Cities and Towns Act). The Cree Villages and the Naskapi Village Act presides over the province's Cree and Naskapi village municipalities, while the Act Respecting Northern Villages and the Kativik Regional Government presides over northern villages. The 5 other types of municipalities are legislated primarily by the Code municipal du Québec (Municipal Code of Quebec). The Municipal Powers Act and 40 other pieces of legislation also apply to municipalities.

Of Quebec's 1,127 local municipalities, 654 or 58% of them are simply "municipalities". Among the remaining 473, there are 234 towns, 42 village municipalities, 131 parish municipalities, 41 township municipalities, 2 united township municipalities, 8 Cree village municipalities, 1 Naskapi village municipality, and 14 northern village municipalities. Despite still being a legal municipal status type, there are no longer any cities in Quebec, although one town is permitted to brand itself as a city in its official name.

In 2021, Quebec's local municipalities covered 38.4% of the province's land mass yet were home to 99.5% of its population. (Note: The remaining 0.5% of Quebec's population resides on the remaining 61.6% of its land mass within Indian reserves, Indian settlements, Inuit land, lands reserved for the Crees, lands reserved for the Naskapi, and unorganized territories.) Montreal is the province's largest municipality with 1,762,949 residents. Chisasibi, Eastmain, Kawawachikamach, Nemaska, Saint-Louis-de-Gonzague-du-Cap-Tourmente, Waskaganish, Waswanipi, Wemindji, and Whapmagoostui are Quebec's smallest municipalities each with a population of 0. (Note: Actual population may not be 0 as Statistics Canada, to protect privacy, rounds population to a random interval of 5 between 0 and 15 inclusive in the event a geographic area's actual population is less than 15.) The largest municipality by land area is Eeyou Istchee Baie-James at 283,123.42 km^{2} (109,314.56 mi^{2}), while the smallest by land area is Notre-Dame-des-Anges at 0.04 km^{2} (0.015 mi^{2}).

== Regional county municipalities ==
A regional county municipality (French: Municipalité régionale de comté) in Quebec is a membership of numerous local municipalities, which in some cases can include unorganized territories, that was formed to administer certain services at the regional level such as waste management, public transit, land use planning and development, property assessment, etc. Its council comprises the mayors of all local municipalities within its membership and in some cases one or more other elected representatives.

Quebec legally recognizes 87 regional county municipalities (RCMs). (Note: The province also recognizes 17 unincorporated geographic equivalents to RCMs.) They had a cumulative population of 3,909,607 in the 2021 Census of Population. The most and least populated of the province's incorporated RCMs are Roussilon with 185,568 residents and Le Golfe-du-Saint-Laurent with 3,382 residents. Quebec's largest and smallest RCMs by land area are Caniapiscau at 64,936.44 km^{2} (25,072.10 mi^{2}) and L'Île-d'Orléans at 194.58 km^{2} (75.13 mi^{2}).

List of regional county municipalities in Quebec
Name	2021 Census of Population				
Name	Population (2021)	Population (2016)	Change	Land area (km^{²})	Population density (/km^{2})
Abitibi	24,764	24,639	+0.5%	7,627.63	3.2
Abitibi-Ouest	20,526	20,538	−0.1%	3,312.45	6.2
Acton	15,654	15,594	+0.4%	579.64	27.0
Antoine-Labelle	36,462	35,243	+3.5%	14,809.85	2.5
Argenteuil	34,752	32,389	+7.3%	1,234.69	28.1
Arthabaska	74,348	72,014	+3.2%	1,887.09	39.4
Avignon	13,415	14,461	−7.2%	3,487.37	3.8
Beauce-Centre	19,253	19,125	+0.7%	839.60	22.9
Beauce-Sartigan	54,198	53,268	+1.7%	2,043.09	26.5
Beauharnois-Salaberry	68,322	64,320	+6.2%	468.48	145.8
Bécancour	20,748	20,404	+1.7%	1,143.13	18.2
Bellechasse	38,000	37,233	+2.1%	1,749.91	21.7
Bonaventure	17,557	17,660	−0.6%	4,379.46	4.0
Brome-Missisquoi	64,786	58,314	+11.1%	1,650.20	39.3
Caniapiscau	3,882	3,881	0.0%	64,936.44	0.1
Charlevoix	13,371	12,997	+2.9%	3,736.80	3.6
Charlevoix-Est	15,409	15,509	−0.6%	2,288.97	6.7
Coaticook	18,906	18,497	+2.2%	1,338.86	14.1
D'Autray	44,080	42,189	+4.5%	1,234.67	35.7
Deux-Montagnes	102,052	98,203	+3.9%	242.88	420.2
Drummond	107,967	103,397	+4.4%	1,599.10	67.5
Joliette	71,124	66,550	+6.9%	417.41	170.4
Kamouraska	21,307	21,073	+1.1%	2,241.05	9.5
La Côte-de-Beaupré	30,240	28,199	+7.2%	4,845.19	6.2
La Côte-de-Gaspé	17,547	17,117	+2.5%	4,088.39	4.3
La Haute-Côte-Nord	10,278	10,846	−5.2%	11,295.82	0.9
La Haute-Gaspésie	10,950	11,316	−3.2%	5,053.88	2.2
La Haute-Yamaska	92,796	88,306	+5.1%	636.00	145.9
La Jacques-Cartier	47,813	43,485	+10.0%	3,183.75	15.0
La Matanie	20,883	21,301	−2.0%	3,315.74	6.3
La Matapédia	17,592	17,925	−1.9%	5,354.53	3.3
La Mitis	18,363	18,210	+0.8%	2,275.56	8.1
La Nouvelle-Beauce	37,988	36,785	+3.3%	905.33	42.0
La Rivière-du-Nord	140,394	128,170	+9.5%	447.88	313.5
La Vallée-de-la-Gatineau	20,547	20,182	+1.8%	12,362.49	1.7
La Vallée-de-l'Or	43,347	43,226	+0.3%	24,094.84	1.8
La Vallée-du-Richelieu	131,803	124,420	+5.9%	587.84	224.2
Lac-Saint-Jean-Est	52,475	52,741	−0.5%	2,767.51	19.0
L'Assomption	128,087	124,759	+2.7%	255.16	502.0
L'Érable	23,534	23,425	+0.5%	1,287.03	18.3
L'Île-d'Orléans	6,817	7,082	−3.7%	194.58	35.0
L'Islet	17,598	17,798	−1.1%	2,097.09	8.4
Le Domaine-du-Roy	31,095	31,285	−0.6%	17,476.45	1.8
Le Fjord-du-Saguenay	23,110	21,600	+7.0%	38,672.61	0.6
Le Golfe-du-Saint-Laurent	3,382	4,736	−28.6%	40,686.75	0.1
Le Granit	21,134	20,639	+2.4%	2,641.18	8.0
Le Haut-Richelieu	121,277	117,443	+3.3%	934.85	129.7
Le Haut-Saint-François	22,926	22,335	+2.6%	2,269.68	10.1
Le Haut-Saint-Laurent	22,213	22,454	−1.1%	1,168.08	19.0
Le Rocher-Percé	17,219	17,282	−0.4%	3,074.80	5.6
Le Val-Saint-François	31,551	30,686	+2.8%	1,401.56	22.5
Les Appalaches	43,412	42,346	+2.5%	1,911.83	22.7
Les Basques	8,797	8,640	+1.8%	882.34	10.0
Les Chenaux	19,180	18,617	+3.0%	872.01	22.0
Les Collines-de-l'Outaouais (Note: In 2022, The RCM lost the municipality of Notre-Dame-de-la-Salette to the Papineau RCM.)	53,657	49,094	+9.3%	1,912.05	28.1
Les Etchemins	16,927	16,536	+2.4%	1,809.61	9.4
Les Jardins-de-Napierville	30,339	27,870	+8.9%	802.52	37.8
Les Laurentides	50,777	45,902	+10.6%	2,457.53	20.7
Les Maskoutains	89,432	87,099	+2.7%	1,302.15	68.7
Les Moulins	171,127	158,267	+8.1%	260.65	656.5
Les Pays-d'en-Haut	46,906	41,877	+12.0%	673.98	69.6
Les Sources	14,623	14,286	+2.4%	785.42	18.6
Lotbinière	34,586	31,741	+9.0%	1,662.26	20.8
Manicouagan	30,158	31,027	−2.8%	34,655.04	0.9
Marguerite-D'Youville	80,313	77,550	+3.6%	347.10	231.4
Maria-Chapdelaine	24,149	24,793	−2.6%	35,501.49	0.7
Maskinongé	37,292	36,316	+2.7%	2,367.08	15.8
Matawinie	55,500	50,435	+10.0%	9,423.15	5.9
Mékinac	12,762	12,358	+3.3%	5,186.22	2.5
Memphrémagog	54,797	50,415	+8.7%	1,317.42	41.6
Minganie	6,467	6,587	−1.8%	53,340.31	0.1
Montcalm	58,680	52,596	+11.6%	709.58	82.7
Montmagny	22,481	22,698	−1.0%	1,695.09	13.3
Nicolet-Yamaska	23,848	23,159	+3.0%	1,004.98	23.7
Papineau (Note: In 2022, The RCM gain the municipality of Notre-Dame-de-la-Salette from the Les Collines-de-l'Outaouais RCM.)	25,149	22,832	+10.1%	3,016.78	8.3
Pierre-De Saurel	51,843	51,025	+1.6%	595.13	87.1
Pontiac	14,764	14,251	+3.6%	12,824.36	1.2
Portneuf	55,523	53,008	+4.7%	3,887.88	14.3
Rimouski-Neigette	57,191	56,650	+1.0%	2,703.99	21.2
Rivière-du-Loup	35,338	33,958	+4.1%	1,276.86	27.7
Roussillon	185,568	171,443	+8.2%	420.44	441.4
Rouville	37,889	36,536	+3.7%	482.80	78.5
Sept-Rivières	34,358	35,441	−3.1%	29,527.90	1.2
Témiscamingue	16,132	15,980	+1.0%	16,327.26	1.0
Témiscouata	19,568	19,628	−0.3%	4,039.95	4.8
Thérèse-De Blainville	163,632	157,103	+4.2%	206.52	792.3
Vaudreuil-Soulanges	162,600	149,349	+8.9%	854.19	190.4
Total regional county municipalities	3,909,607	3,738,625	+4.6%	553,765.38	7.1
Province of Quebec	8,501,833	8,164,361	+4.1%	1,298,599.75	6.5

== Local municipalities ==
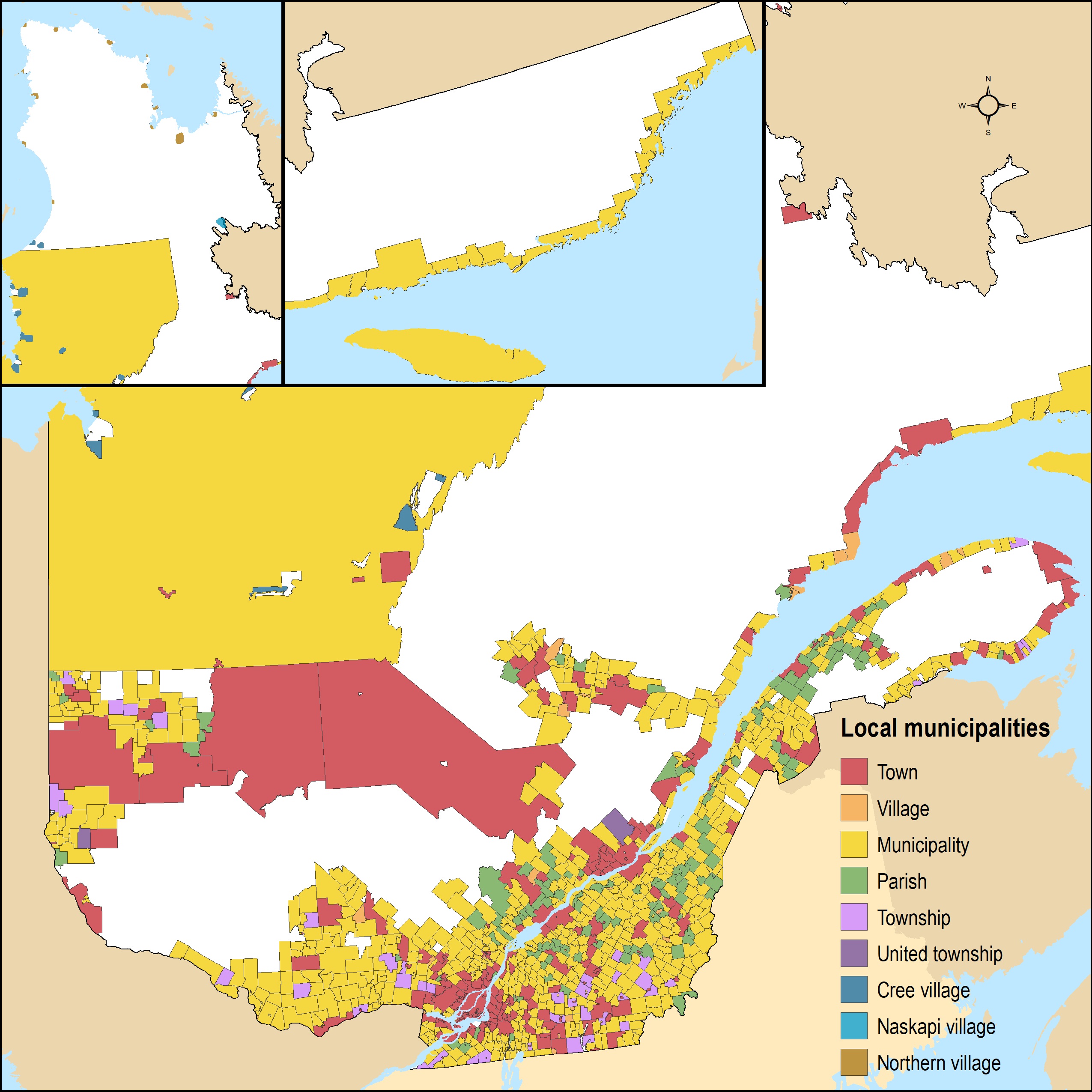
Quebec's 1,131 local municipalities by type as of the 2021 federal census

Quebec's Act Respecting Municipal Territorial Divisions states that a "municipality that is not a regional county municipality is a local municipality." The province's 10 types of local municipalities include cities, towns, village municipalities, parish municipalities, township municipalities, united township municipalities, municipalities, Cree village municipalities, Naskapi village municipalities, and northern village municipalities.

=== Cities ===
City (French: cité) status is no longer officially in use in Quebec. The last municipalities to have city status in Quebec were Dorval and Côte-Saint-Luc. Both held city status until they dissolved to become part of an amalgamated Montreal on January 1, 2002. While both were re-incorporated as towns on January 1, 2006, Dorval retained "City of Dorval" (French: Cité de Dorval) as its name for branding purposes.

Prior to 1988 amendments to the Cities and Towns Act, cities could be formed from any municipality in effect under the Municipal Code of Quebec with a population of 2,000 or more if the municipality:

- passed a resolution to formally request the Government of Quebec to change to city status;
- published the proposed resolution twice in the provincial gazette;
- obtained approval of its voters during an election or through a referendum; and
- submitted a petition to the Minister of Municipal Affairs for the letters patent to be granted within two months of the voters' approval that details the population, name, and boundaries of the city as well as the location of its first meeting of city council.

Upon submission of the petition with a certificate signed by the municipality's secretary-treasurer confirming the resolution's approval, the Government of Quebec could hold a public inquiry on the city status application, approve the application by granting the letters patent, and alter the proposed name of the city from the name proposed in the application.

Also prior to the 1988 amendments to the Cities and Towns Act, the Government of Quebec could consider and approve an application for city status from a municipality with a population of less than 2,000 under circumstances it deemed extenuating.

=== Towns ===
Quebec has 234 towns (French: villes) that had a cumulative population of 7,169,324 in the 2021 Census of Population. Quebec's largest and smallest towns by population are Montreal and L'Île-Dorval with populations of 1,762,949 and 30. Quebec's largest and smallest towns by land area are La Tuque and L'Île-Dorval with 24,809.40 km^{2} (9,578.96 mi^{2}) and 0.19 km^{2} (0.073 mi^{2}).

Prior to 1988 amendments to the Cities and Towns Act, towns could be formed from any municipality in effect under the Municipal Code of Quebec with a population of 2,000 or more if the municipality:

- passed a resolution to formally request the Government of Quebec to change to town status;
- published the proposed resolution twice in the provincial gazette;
- obtained approval of its voters during an election or through a referendum; and
- submitted a petition to the Minister of Municipal Affairs for the letters patent to be granted within two months of the voters' approval that details the population, name, and boundaries of the town as well as the location of its first meeting of town council.

Upon submission of the petition with a certificate signed by the municipality's secretary-treasurer confirming the resolution's approval, the Government of Quebec could hold a public inquiry on the town status application, approve the application by granting the letters patent, and alter the proposed name of the town from the name proposed in the application.

Also prior to the 1988 amendments to the Cities and Towns Act, the Government of Quebec could consider and approve an application for town or city status from a municipality with a population of less than 2,000 under circumstances it deemed extenuating.

Under current legislation, any towns that were incorporated by special legislation or letters patent prior to September 1, 1979, or incorporated by any charter or letters patent approved under the Cities and Towns Act between September 1, 1979, and May 7, 1996, inclusive are subject to the Cities and Towns Act.

=== Village municipalities ===
In Quebec, a village (French: village) is an "[r]ural agglomeration characterized by a more or less concentrated habitat, possessing essential services and offering a form of community life", while a village parish municipality (French: municipalité de village) is the "[t]erritory of a village erected into a municipality." (Note: Quote(s) are English translations of French-language content in the associated reference.) The Municipal Code of Quebec applies to all village municipalities in Quebec.

Quebec has 41 village municipalities that had a cumulative population of 44,120 in the 2021 Census of Population. Quebec's largest village municipality is Val-David with a population of 5,558, while Kingsbury is province's smallest village municipality with a population of 142. Quebec's largest and smallest village municipalities by area are Baie-Trinité and Lac-Poulin with land areas of 417.48 km^{2} (161.19 mi^{2}) and 0.88 km^{2} (0.34 mi^{2}).

=== Parish municipalities ===
A parish (French: paroisse) in Quebec is an "[e]cclesiastical district where the jurisdiction of a minister of religion (priest, pastor, etc.) is exercised", while a parish municipality (French: municipalité de paroisse) is the "[t]erritory of a parish erected into a municipality." The Municipal Code of Quebec applies to all parish municipalities in Quebec.

Quebec has 129 parish municipalities that had a cumulative population of 131,772 in the 2021 Census of Population. Quebec's largest and smallest parish municipalities Notre-Dame-du-Mont-Carmel and Saint-Louis-de-Gonzague-du-Cap-Tourmente with populations of 6,121 and 0. Quebec's largest and smallest parish municipalities by land area are Saint-Alexis-des-Monts and Notre-Dame-des-Anges with 1,035.74 km^{2} (399.90 mi^{2}) and 0.04 km^{2} (0.015 mi^{2}).

=== Township municipalities ===
In Quebec, a township (French: canton) is an "[t]erritorial unit of a system of division of space, generally rectangular in shape, used for the freehold concession of public lands", while a township municipality (French: municipalité de canton) is the "[t]erritory or part of territory of a township established as a municipality." The Municipal Code of Quebec applies to all township municipalities in Quebec.

Quebec has 41 township municipalities that had a cumulative population of 47,954 and in the 2021 Census of Population. Quebec's largest and smallest township municipalities by population are Shefford and Hampden with populations of 7,253 and 193. Quebec's largest and smallest township municipalities by area are Nédélec and Bedford with land areas of 371.49 km^{2} (143.43 mi^{2}) and 31.96 km^{2} (12.34 mi^{2}).

=== United township municipalities ===
A united township municipality (French: municipalité de cantons unis) in Quebec is the "[t]erritory of two or more neighbo[u]ring townships erected into a municipality." The Municipal Code of Quebec applies to all united township municipalities in Quebec.

Quebec has two united township municipalities that had a cumulative population of 10,002 and in the 2021 Census of Population. Stoneham-et-Tewkesbury, the larger united township municipality, had a population of 9,682 and a land area of 670.03 km^{2} (258.70 mi^{2}) in 2021, while Latulipe-et-Gaboury had a population of 320 and a land area of 270.11 km^{2} (104.29 mi^{2}).

=== Municipalities ===
A municipality (French: municipalité) in Quebec is the "[t]erritory over which a local authority is exercised in accordance with municipal laws." The Municipal Code of Quebec applies to all municipalities in Quebec.

Quebec has 652 municipalities that are simply designated "municipalities". They had a cumulative population of 1,042,249 in the 2021 Census of Population. Quebec's largest and smallest municipalities are Sainte-Sophie and Saint-Benoît-du-Lac with populations of 18,080 and 43. Quebec's largest and smallest municipalities by land area are Eeyou Istchee Baie-James and Howick with 283,123.42 km^{2} (109,314.56 mi^{2}) and 0.96 km^{2} (0.37 mi^{2}).

=== Cree village municipalities ===
In Quebec, a Cree village (French: village cri) is an "[a]gglomeration inhabited mainly by the Crees and located on category 1A lands as defined in the James Bay and Northern Quebec Agreement", while a Cree village municipality (French: municipalité de village cri) is the "[t]erritory over which a local Cree authority is exercised in accordance with the Act respecting the Cree villages and the Naskapi village." The Cree Villages and the Naskapi Village Act applies to all Cree village municipalities in Quebec.

Quebec has 9 Cree village municipalities of which 8 were unpopulated as of the 2021 Census of Population. With 10 residents, Mistissini was Quebec's only populated Cree village municipality as of 2021. The province's largest and smallest Cree village municipalities by area are Mistissini and Nemaska with land areas of 488.03 km^{2} (188.43 mi^{2}) and 47.89 km^{2} (18.49 mi^{2}).

=== Naskapi village municipalities ===
In Quebec, a Naskapi village (French: village naskapi) is an "[a]gglomeration inhabited mainly by Naskapis and located on category 1A-N lands as defined in the Northeastern Quebec Agreement", while a Naskapi village municipality (French: municipalité de village naskapi) is the "[t]erritory over which a Naskapi local authority is exercised in accordance with the Act respecting the Cree villages and the Naskapi village." The Cree Villages and the Naskapi Village Act applies to the province's lone Naskapi village municipality in Quebec.

Kawawachikamach is Quebec's only Naskapi village municipality. It had no residents and a land area of 234.80 km^{2} (90.66 mi^{2}) as of the 2021 Census of Population.

=== Northern village municipalities ===
In Quebec, a northern village municipality (French: municipalité de village nordique) is the "[t]erritory over which local authority is exercised in accordance with the Act respecting northern villages and the Kativik Regional Government." Act Respecting Northern Villages and the Kativik Regional Government applies to all northern village municipalities in Quebec.

The province has 14 northern village municipalities that had a cumulative population of 14,045 in the 2021 Census of Population. Quebec's largest northern village municipality is Kuujjuaq with a population of 2,638, while Aupaluk is province's smallest northern village municipality with a population of 233. Quebec's largest and smallest northern village municipalities by area are Kuujjuaq and Kuujjuarapik with land areas of 289.97 km^{2} (111.96 mi^{2}) and 7.45 km^{2} (2.88 mi^{2}).

=== List of local municipalities ===
List of local municipalities in Quebec
Name	Status	Regional county municipality (RCM) or territorial equivalent (TE) (Note: Some RCMs and TEs are also census divisions.)	2021 Census of Population				
Name	Status	Regional county municipality (RCM) or territorial equivalent (TE)	Population (2021)	Population (2016)	Change	Land area (km^{2})	Population density (/km^{2})
Abercorn	Village	RCM Brome-Missisquoi	341	334	+2.1%	26.72	12.8
Acton Vale	Town	RCM Acton	7,605	7,656	−0.7%	91.01	83.6
Adstock	Municipality	RCM Les Appalaches	2,903	2,806	+3.5%	290.03	10.0
Aguanish	Municipality	RCM Minganie	224	245	−8.6%	532.04	0.4
Akulivik	Northern village	Kativik TE	642	633	+1.4%	75.02	8.6
Albanel	Municipality	RCM Maria-Chapdelaine	2,181	2,262	−3.6%	197.45	11.0
Albertville	Municipality	RCM La Matapédia	239	226	+5.8%	103.13	2.3
Alleyn-et-Cawood	Municipality	RCM Pontiac	229	172	+33.1%	308.91	0.7
Alma	Town	RCM Lac-Saint-Jean-Est	30,331	30,771	−1.4%	194.92	155.6
Amherst	Township	RCM Les Laurentides	1,728	1,484	+16.4%	227.86	7.6
Amos	Town	RCM Abitibi	13,701	13,763	−0.5%	542.19	25.3
Amqui	Town	RCM La Matapédia	5,999	6,178	−2.9%	121.02	49.6
Ange-Gardien	Municipality	RCM Rouville	2,889	2,699	+7.0%	90.21	32.0
Armagh	Municipality	RCM Bellechasse	1,439	1,488	−3.3%	167.99	8.6
Arundel	Township	RCM Les Laurentides	578	563	+2.7%	63.45	9.1
Ascot Corner	Municipality	RCM Le Haut-Saint-François	3,368	3,158	+6.6%	81.64	41.3
Aston-Jonction	Municipality	RCM Nicolet-Yamaska	441	424	+4.0%	26.20	16.8
Auclair	Municipality	RCM Témiscouata	447	448	−0.2%	105.78	4.2
Audet	Municipality	RCM Le Granit	708	734	−3.5%	134.95	5.2
Aumond	Township	RCM La Vallée-de-la-Gatineau	754	754	0.0%	212.82	3.5
Aupaluk	Northern village	Kativik TE	233	209	+11.5%	28.68	8.1
Austin	Municipality	RCM Memphrémagog	1,748	1,485	+17.7%	73.58	23.8
Authier	Municipality	RCM Abitibi-Ouest	290	268	+8.2%	142.22	2.0
Authier-Nord	Municipality	RCM Abitibi-Ouest	288	300	−4.0%	278.05	1.0
Ayer's Cliff	Village	RCM Memphrémagog	1,180	1,073	+10.0%	5.53	213.4
Baie-Comeau	Town	RCM Manicouagan	20,687	21,536	−3.9%	334.83	61.8
Baie-D'Urfé	Town	Urban agglomeration of Montreal	3,764	3,823	−1.5%	6.03	624.2
Baie-des-Sables	Municipality	RCM La Matanie	613	628	−2.4%	65.07	9.4
Baie-du-Febvre	Municipality	RCM Nicolet-Yamaska	961	988	−2.7%	96.78	9.9
Baie-Johan-Beetz	Municipality	RCM Minganie	84	86	−2.3%	327.46	0.3
Baie-Saint-Paul	Town	RCM Charlevoix	7,371	7,146	+3.1%	545.85	13.5
Baie-Sainte-Catherine	Municipality	RCM Charlevoix-Est	184	206	−10.7%	232.89	0.8
Baie-Trinité	Village	RCM Manicouagan	438	407	+7.6%	417.48	1.0
Barkmere	Town	RCM Les Laurentides	81	58	+39.7%	17.72	4.6
Barnston-Ouest	Municipality	RCM Coaticook	546	559	−2.3%	99.36	5.5
Barraute	Municipality	RCM Abitibi	1,986	1,968	+0.9%	493.04	4.0
Batiscan	Municipality	RCM Les Chenaux	958	903	+6.1%	43.25	22.2
Beaconsfield	Town	Urban agglomeration of Montreal	19,277	19,324	−0.2%	11.03	1,747.7
Béarn	Municipality	RCM Témiscamingue	708	720	−1.7%	496.28	1.4
Beauceville	Town	RCM Beauce-Centre	6,185	6,291	−1.7%	164.59	37.6
Beauharnois	Town	RCM Beauharnois-Salaberry	13,638	12,884	+5.9%	68.22	199.9
Beaulac-Garthby	Municipality	RCM Les Appalaches	931	905	+2.9%	75.96	12.3
Beaumont	Municipality	RCM Bellechasse	2,968	2,942	+0.9%	44.57	66.6
Beaupré	Town	RCM La Côte-de-Beaupré	4,117	3,752	+9.7%	22.97	179.2
Bécancour	Town	RCM Bécancour	13,561	13,031	+4.1%	439.54	30.9
Bedford	Township	RCM Brome-Missisquoi	658	687	−4.2%	31.96	20.6
Bedford	Town	RCM Brome-Missisquoi	2,558	2,560	−0.1%	4.23	604.7
Bégin	Municipality	RCM Le Fjord-du-Saguenay	851	818	+4.0%	189.67	4.5
Belcourt	Municipality	RCM La Vallée-de-l'Or	219	225	−2.7%	409.74	0.5
Belleterre	Town	RCM Témiscamingue	285	313	−8.9%	544.49	0.5
Beloeil	Town	RCM La Vallée-du-Richelieu	24,104	22,458	+7.3%	24.38	988.7
Berry	Municipality	RCM Abitibi	535	538	−0.6%	575.07	0.9
Berthier-sur-Mer	Municipality	RCM Montmagny	1,744	1,555	+12.2%	26.85	65.0
Berthierville	Town	RCM D'Autray	4,386	4,189	+4.7%	6.77	647.9
Béthanie	Municipality	RCM Acton	350	322	+8.7%	47.01	7.4
Biencourt	Municipality	RCM Témiscouata	433	464	−6.7%	187.12	2.3
Blainville	Town	RCM Thérèse-De Blainville	59,819	56,863	+5.2%	54.97	1,088.2
Blanc-Sablon	Municipality	RCM Le Golfe-du-Saint-Laurent	1,122	1,112	+0.9%	234.98	4.8
Blue Sea	Municipality	RCM La Vallée-de-la-Gatineau	696	639	+8.9%	72.97	9.5
Boileau	Municipality	RCM Papineau	405	335	+20.9%	134.08	3.0
Boisbriand	Town	RCM Thérèse-De Blainville	28,308	26,884	+5.3%	27.67	1,023.1
Bois-des-Filion	Town	RCM Thérèse-De Blainville	10,159	9,636	+5.4%	4.36	2,330.0
Bois-Franc	Municipality	RCM La Vallée-de-la-Gatineau	411	421	−2.4%	71.56	5.7
Boischatel	Municipality	RCM La Côte-de-Beaupré	8,231	7,587	+8.5%	20.36	404.3
Bolton-Est	Municipality	RCM Memphrémagog	1,108	940	+17.9%	79.39	14.0
Bolton-Ouest	Municipality	RCM Brome-Missisquoi	732	630	+16.2%	100.94	7.3
Bonaventure	Town	RCM Bonaventure	2,733	2,706	+1.0%	104.5	26.2
Bonne-Espérance	Municipality	RCM Le Golfe-du-Saint-Laurent	692	681	+1.6%	622.99	1.1
Bonsecours	Municipality	RCM Le Val-Saint-François	650	608	+6.9%	60.36	10.8
Boucherville	Town	Urban agglomeration of Longueuil	41,743	41,671	+0.2%	71.02	587.8
Bouchette	Municipality	RCM La Vallée-de-la-Gatineau	695	731	−4.9%	122.09	5.7
Bowman	Municipality	RCM Papineau	667	658	+1.4%	126.4	5.3
Brébeuf	Municipality	RCM Les Laurentides	1,009	976	+3.4%	35.78	28.2
Brigham	Municipality	RCM Brome-Missisquoi	2,282	2,306	−1.0%	86.92	26.3
Bristol	Municipality	RCM Pontiac	1,199	1,036	+15.7%	206.19	5.8
Brome	Village	RCM Brome-Missisquoi	341	296	+15.2%	11.56	29.5
Bromont	Town	RCM Brome-Missisquoi	11,357	9,041	+25.6%	114.05	99.6
Brossard	Town	Urban agglomeration of Longueuil	91,525	85,721	+6.8%	45.19	2,025.3
Brownsburg-Chatham	Town	RCM Argenteuil	7,247	7,122	+1.8%	244.46	29.6
Bryson	Municipality	RCM Pontiac	646	697	−7.3%	3.58	180.4
Bury	Municipality	RCM Le Haut-Saint-François	1,252	1,174	+6.6%	234.13	5.3
Cacouna	Municipality	RCM Rivière-du-Loup	1,848	1,803	+2.5%	62.75	29.5
Calixa-Lavallée	Municipality	RCM Marguerite-D'Youville	509	523	−2.7%	32.20	15.8
Campbell's Bay	Municipality	RCM Pontiac	705	744	−5.2%	3.42	206.1
Candiac	Town	RCM Roussillon	22,997	21,047	+9.3%	17.27	1,331.6
Cantley	Municipality	RCM Les Collines-de-l'Outaouais	11,449	10,699	+7.0%	126.12	90.8
Cap-Chat	Town	RCM La Haute-Gaspésie	2,516	2,476	+1.6%	181.31	13.9
Cap-Saint-Ignace	Municipality	RCM Montmagny	3,099	3,089	+0.3%	204.32	15.2
Cap-Santé	Town	RCM Portneuf	3,594	3,410	+5.4%	54.49	66.0
Caplan	Municipality	RCM Bonaventure	1,966	2,024	−2.9%	85.69	22.9
Carignan	Town	RCM La Vallée-du-Richelieu	11,740	9,462	+24.1%	62.07	189.1
Carleton-sur-Mer	Town	RCM Avignon	4,081	4,073	+0.2%	221.48	18.4
Cascapédia--Saint-Jules	Municipality	RCM Bonaventure	764	730	+4.7%	164.29	4.7
Causapscal	Town	RCM La Matapédia	2,147	2,304	−6.8%	161.61	13.3
Cayamant	Municipality	RCM La Vallée-de-la-Gatineau	895	821	+9.0%	382.49	2.3
Chambly	Town	RCM La Vallée-du-Richelieu	31,444	29,120	+8.0%	25.08	1,253.7
Chambord	Municipality	RCM Le Domaine-du-Roy	1,748	1,765	−1.0%	120.85	14.5
Champlain	Municipality	RCM Les Chenaux	1,807	1,735	+4.1%	58.17	31.1
Champneuf	Municipality	RCM Abitibi	94	123	−23.6%	241.32	0.4
Chandler	Town	RCM Le Rocher-Percé	7,490	7,546	−0.7%	418.45	17.9
Chapais	Town	Jamésie TE	1,468	1,499	−2.1%	62.31	23.6
Charette	Municipality	RCM Maskinongé	1,034	953	+8.5%	41.90	24.7
Charlemagne	Town	RCM L'Assomption	6,302	5,913	+6.6%	2.17	2,904.1
Chartierville	Municipality	RCM Le Haut-Saint-François	319	276	+15.6%	141.94	2.2
Château-Richer	Town	RCM La Côte-de-Beaupré	4,425	4,126	+7.2%	228.84	19.3
Châteauguay	Town	RCM Roussillon	50,815	47,906	+6.1%	34.31	1,481.1
Chazel	Municipality	RCM Abitibi-Ouest	254	289	−12.1%	133.55	1.9
Chelsea	Municipality	RCM Les Collines-de-l'Outaouais	8,000	6,909	+15.8%	112.65	71.0
Chénéville	Municipality	RCM Papineau	848	764	+11.0%	65.83	12.9
Chertsey	Municipality	RCM Matawinie	5,295	4,696	+12.8%	286.05	18.5
Chesterville	Municipality	RCM Arthabaska	877	922	−4.9%	116.72	7.5
Chibougamau	Town	Jamésie TE	7,233	7,504	−3.6%	694.87	10.4
Chichester	Township	RCM Pontiac	350	348	+0.6%	218.74	1.6
Chisasibi	Cree village	Eeyou Istchee TE	0	0	NA	480.29	0.0
Chute-aux-Outardes	Village	RCM Manicouagan	1,391	1,563	−11.0%	7.51	185.2
Chute-Saint-Philippe	Municipality	RCM Antoine-Labelle	1,039	942	+10.3%	298.64	3.5
Clarenceville	Municipality	RCM Le Haut-Richelieu	1,154	1,103	+4.6%	63.06	18.3
Clarendon	Municipality	RCM Pontiac	1,392	1,256	+10.8%	330.46	4.2
Clermont	Township	RCM Abitibi-Ouest	484	492	−1.6%	156.66	3.1
Clermont	Town	RCM Charlevoix-Est	3,065	3,085	−0.6%	51.53	59.5
Clerval	Municipality	RCM Abitibi-Ouest	373	371	+0.5%	99.17	3.8
Cleveland	Township	RCM Le Val-Saint-François	1,581	1,541	+2.6%	123.59	12.8
Cloridorme	Township	RCM La Côte-de-Gaspé	607	671	−9.5%	158.74	3.8
Coaticook	Town	RCM Coaticook	8,867	8,955	−1.0%	219.45	40.4
Colombier	Municipality	RCM La Haute-Côte-Nord	635	685	−7.3%	361.23	1.8
Compton	Municipality	RCM Coaticook	3,270	3,131	+4.4%	206.58	15.8
Contrecoeur	Town	RCM Marguerite-D'Youville	9,480	7,887	+20.2%	62.2	152.4
Cookshire-Eaton	Town	RCM Le Haut-Saint-François	5,344	5,393	−0.9%	296.25	18.0
Côte-Nord-du-Golfe-du-Saint-Laurent	Municipality	RCM Le Golfe-du-Saint-Laurent	787	856	−8.1%	2,597.05	0.3
Côte-Saint-Luc	Town	Urban agglomeration of Montreal	34,504	32,448	+6.3%	7.04	4,901.1
Coteau-du-Lac	Town	RCM Vaudreuil-Soulanges	7,473	7,044	+6.1%	46.87	159.4
Courcelles-Saint-Évariste	Municipality	RCM Beauce-Sartigan	1,325	1,368	−3.1%	201.19	6.6
Cowansville	Town	RCM Brome-Missisquoi	15,234	13,656	+11.6%	46.87	325.0
Crabtree	Town	RCM Joliette	4,155	3,958	+5.0%	25.06	165.8
Danville	Town	RCM Les Sources	3,888	3,826	+1.6%	151.73	25.6
Daveluyville	Town	RCM Arthabaska	2,360	2,255	+4.7%	61.71	38.2
Dégelis	Town	RCM Témiscouata	2,884	2,863	+0.7%	556.78	5.2
Déléage	Municipality	RCM La Vallée-de-la-Gatineau	1,916	1,852	+3.5%	248.26	7.7
Delson	Town	RCM Roussillon	8,328	7,457	+11.7%	7.64	1,090.1
Denholm	Municipality	RCM La Vallée-de-la-Gatineau	546	505	+8.1%	177.33	3.1
Desbiens	Town	RCM Lac-Saint-Jean-Est	995	1,028	−3.2%	10.39	95.8
Deschaillons-sur-Saint-Laurent	Municipality	RCM Bécancour	906	909	−0.3%	36.51	24.8
Deschambault-Grondines	Municipality	RCM Portneuf	2,235	2,220	+0.7%	124.02	18.0
Deux-Montagnes	Town	RCM Deux-Montagnes	17,915	17,496	+2.4%	6.08	2,946.5
Disraeli	Parish	RCM Les Appalaches	1,163	1,123	+3.6%	92.53	12.6
Disraeli	Town	RCM Les Appalaches	2,360	2,336	+1.0%	6.80	347.1
Dixville	Municipality	RCM Coaticook	732	696	+5.2%	76.56	9.6
Dolbeau-Mistassini	Town	RCM Maria-Chapdelaine	13,718	14,212	−3.5%	293.43	46.8
Dollard-des-Ormeaux	Town	Urban agglomeration of Montreal	48,403	48,899	−1.0%	14.98	3,231.2
Donnacona	Town	RCM Portneuf	7,436	7,200	+3.3%	20.20	368.1
Dorval	Town	Urban agglomeration of Montreal	19,302	18,980	+1.7%	20.91	923.1
Dosquet	Municipality	RCM Lotbinière	935	944	−1.0%	65.07	14.4
Drummondville	Town	RCM Drummond	79,258	75,423	+5.1%	247.11	320.7
Dudswell	Municipality	RCM Le Haut-Saint-François	1,755	1,727	+1.6%	218.01	8.1
Duhamel	Municipality	RCM Papineau	569	430	+32.3%	427.32	1.3
Duhamel-Ouest	Municipality	RCM Témiscamingue	945	878	+7.6%	91.49	10.3
Dundee	Township	RCM Le Haut-Saint-Laurent	386	387	−0.3%	68.41	5.6
Dunham	Town	RCM Brome-Missisquoi	3,599	3,432	+4.9%	193.86	18.6
Duparquet	Town	RCM Abitibi-Ouest	716	666	+7.5%	121.17	5.9
Dupuy	Municipality	RCM Abitibi-Ouest	940	931	+1.0%	122.43	7.7
Durham-Sud	Municipality	RCM Drummond	1,051	1,043	+0.8%	92.64	11.3
East Angus	Town	RCM Le Haut-Saint-François	3,840	3,659	+4.9%	7.84	489.8
East Broughton	Municipality	RCM Les Appalaches	2,248	2,199	+2.2%	8.86	253.7
East Farnham	Municipality	RCM Brome-Missisquoi	612	554	+10.5%	5.02	121.9
East Hereford	Municipality	RCM Coaticook	282	269	+4.8%	72.1	3.9
Eastman	Municipality	RCM Memphrémagog	2,279	1,843	+23.7%	73.57	31.0
Eastmain	Cree village	Eeyou Istchee TE	0	0	NA	317.72	0.0
Eeyou Istchee Baie-James	Municipality	Jamésie TE	2,638	1,579	+67.1%	283,123.42	0.0
Egan-Sud	Municipality	RCM La Vallée-de-la-Gatineau	508	504	+0.8%	49.82	10.2
Elgin	Municipality	RCM Le Haut-Saint-Laurent	389	394	−1.3%	69.35	5.6
Entrelacs	Municipality	RCM Matawinie	1,054	928	+13.6%	48.71	21.6
Escuminac	Municipality	RCM Avignon	575	544	+5.7%	108.7	5.3
Esprit-Saint	Municipality	RCM Rimouski-Neigette	340	341	−0.3%	168.96	2.0
Estérel	Town	RCM Les Pays-d'en-Haut	262	196	+33.7%	12.62	20.8
Farnham	Town	RCM Brome-Missisquoi	10,149	8,909	+13.9%	92.12	110.2
Fassett	Municipality	RCM Papineau	453	431	+5.1%	12.52	36.2
Ferland-et-Boilleau	Municipality	RCM Le Fjord-du-Saguenay	632	540	+17.0%	383.09	1.6
Ferme-Neuve	Municipality	RCM Antoine-Labelle	2,716	2,706	+0.4%	786.19	3.5
Fermont	Town	RCM Caniapiscau	2,256	2,474	−8.8%	451.12	5.0
Forestville	Town	RCM La Haute-Côte-Nord	2,892	3,081	−6.1%	192.61	15.0
Fort-Coulonge	Village	RCM Pontiac	1,312	1,433	−8.4%	2.96	443.2
Fortierville	Municipality	RCM Bécancour	660	669	−1.3%	44.55	14.8
Fossambault-sur-le-Lac	Town	RCM La Jacques-Cartier	2,327	1,960	+18.7%	11.49	202.5
Frampton	Municipality	RCM La Nouvelle-Beauce	1,309	1,297	+0.9%	151.27	8.7
Franklin	Municipality	RCM Le Haut-Saint-Laurent	1,635	1,636	−0.1%	112.33	14.6
Franquelin	Municipality	RCM Manicouagan	285	313	−8.9%	436.55	0.7
Frelighsburg	Municipality	RCM Brome-Missisquoi	1,123	1,111	+1.1%	123.31	9.1
Frontenac	Municipality	RCM Le Granit	1,811	1,734	+4.4%	223.6	8.1
Fugèreville	Municipality	RCM Témiscamingue	326	326	0.0%	157.12	2.1
Gallichan	Municipality	RCM Abitibi-Ouest	488	468	+4.3%	73.61	6.6
Gaspé	Town	RCM La Côte-de-Gaspé	15,063	14,568	+3.4%	1,118.77	13.5
Gatineau	Town	Equivalent territory	291,041	276,245	+5.4%	341.84	851.4
Girardville	Municipality	RCM Maria-Chapdelaine	1,018	988	+3.0%	124.11	8.2
Godbout	Village	RCM Manicouagan	272	265	+2.6%	159.18	1.7
Godmanchester	Township	RCM Le Haut-Saint-Laurent	1,403	1,394	+0.6%	138.66	10.1
Gore	Township	RCM Argenteuil	2,283	1,904	+19.9%	90.04	25.4
Gracefield	Town	RCM La Vallée-de-la-Gatineau	2,376	2,462	−3.5%	380.94	6.2
Granby	Town	RCM La Haute-Yamaska	69,025	66,222	+4.2%	152.69	452.1
Grand-Métis	Municipality	RCM La Mitis	218	213	+2.3%	25.12	8.7
Grand-Remous	Municipality	RCM La Vallée-de-la-Gatineau	1,159	1,161	−0.2%	351.63	3.3
Grand-Saint-Esprit	Municipality	RCM Nicolet-Yamaska	488	476	+2.5%	27.22	17.9
Grande-Rivière	Town	RCM Le Rocher-Percé	3,384	3,408	−0.7%	87.92	38.5
Grande-Vallée	Municipality	RCM La Côte-de-Gaspé	1,077	1,057	+1.9%	144.16	7.5
Grandes-Piles	Village	RCM Mékinac	493	415	+18.8%	116.97	4.2
Grenville	Village	RCM Argenteuil	1,816	1,711	+6.1%	2.82	644.0
Grenville-sur-la-Rouge	Municipality	RCM Argenteuil	2,883	2,824	+2.1%	313.61	9.2
Gros-Mécatina	Municipality	RCM Le Golfe-du-Saint-Laurent	356	451	−21.1%	742.15	0.5
Grosse-Île	Municipality	Urban agglomeration of Les Îles-de-la-Madeleine	464	465	−0.2%	32.28	14.4
Grosses-Roches	Municipality	RCM La Matanie	375	394	−4.8%	63.59	5.9
Guérin	Township	RCM Témiscamingue	333	320	+4.1%	188.52	1.8
Ham-Nord	Township	RCM Arthabaska	857	869	−1.4%	103.98	8.2
Ham-Sud	Municipality	RCM Les Sources	214	235	−8.9%	151.21	1.4
Hampden	Township	RCM Le Haut-Saint-François	193	176	+9.7%	111.68	1.7
Hampstead	Town	Urban agglomeration of Montreal	7,037	6,973	+0.9%	1.79	3,931.3
Harrington	Township	RCM Argenteuil	967	846	+14.3%	233.65	4.1
Hatley	Municipality	RCM Memphrémagog	771	685	+12.6%	60.43	12.8
Hatley	Township	RCM Memphrémagog	2,230	2,106	+5.9%	71.6	31.1
Havelock	Township	RCM Le Haut-Saint-Laurent	756	740	+2.2%	88.7	8.5
Havre-Saint-Pierre	Municipality	RCM Minganie	3,337	3,460	−3.6%	2,570.09	1.3
Hébertville	Municipality	RCM Lac-Saint-Jean-Est	6,631	6,654	−0.3%	370.10	17.9
Hemmingford	Township	RCM Les Jardins-de-Napierville	1,995	1,900	+5.0%	157.22	12.7
Hemmingford	Village	RCM Les Jardins-de-Napierville	829	755	+9.8%	1.07	774.8
Henryville	Municipality	RCM Le Haut-Richelieu	1,497	1,406	+6.5%	64.82	23.1
Hérouxville	Parish	RCM Mékinac	1,367	1,278	+7.0%	54.72	25.0
Hinchinbrooke	Municipality	RCM Le Haut-Saint-Laurent	2,187	2,103	+4.0%	148.36	14.7
Honfleur	Municipality	RCM Bellechasse	881	849	+3.8%	50.67	17.4
Hope	Township	RCM Bonaventure	584	568	+2.8%	70.55	8.3
Hope Town	Municipality	RCM Bonaventure	334	339	−1.5%	51.26	6.5
Howick	Municipality	RCM Le Haut-Saint-Laurent	850	778	+9.3%	0.96	885.4
Huberdeau	Municipality	RCM Les Laurentides	863	868	−0.6%	56.72	15.2
Hudson	Town	RCM Vaudreuil-Soulanges	5,411	5,157	+4.9%	21.79	248.3
Huntingdon	Town	RCM Le Haut-Saint-Laurent	2,556	2,444	+4.6%	2.77	922.7
Ivujivik	Northern village	Kativik TE	412	414	−0.5%	35.15	11.7
Inukjuak	Northern village	Kativik TE	1,821	1,757	+3.6%	54.92	33.2
Inverness	Municipality	RCM L'Érable	910	899	+1.2%	176.11	5.2
Irlande	Municipality	RCM Les Appalaches	897	884	+1.5%	109.85	8.2
Ivry-sur-le-Lac	Municipality	RCM Les Laurentides	391	387	+1.0%	29.30	13.3
Joliette	Town	RCM Joliette	21,384	20,484	+4.4%	22.96	931.4
Kamouraska	Municipality	RCM Kamouraska	607	616	−1.5%	44.07	13.8
Kangiqsualujjuaq	Northern village	Kativik TE	956	942	+1.5%	34.33	27.8
Kangiqsujuaq	Northern village	Kativik TE	837	750	+11.6%	12.41	67.4
Kangirsuk	Northern village	Kativik TE	561	567	−1.1%	57.15	9.8
Kawawachikamach	Naskapi village	Kativik TE	0	0	NA	234.8	0.0
Kazabazua	Municipality	RCM La Vallée-de-la-Gatineau	1,037	945	+9.7%	172.91	6.0
Kiamika	Municipality	RCM Antoine-Labelle	790	757	+4.4%	337.53	2.3
Kingsbury	Village	RCM Le Val-Saint-François	142	138	+2.9%	6.11	23.2
Kingsey Falls	Town	RCM Arthabaska	1,986	1,947	+2.0%	69.36	28.6
Kinnear's Mills	Municipality	RCM Les Appalaches	397	350	+13.4%	93.66	4.2
Kipawa	Municipality	RCM Témiscamingue	446	499	−10.6%	35.58	12.5
Kirkland	Town	Urban agglomeration of Montreal	19,413	20,151	−3.7%	9.65	2,011.7
Kuujjuaq	Northern village	Kativik TE	2,668	2,754	−3.1%	289.97	9.2
Kuujjuarapik	Northern village	Kativik TE	792	792	0.0%	7.45	106.3
L'Ancienne-Lorette	Town	Urban agglomeration of Quebec City	16,970	16,543	+2.6%	7.72	2,198.2
L'Ange-Gardien	Municipality	RCM Les Collines-de-l'Outaouais	6,102	5,464	+11.7%	216.05	28.2
L'Ange-Gardien	Municipality	RCM La Côte-de-Beaupré	3,842	3,695	+4.0%	53.61	71.7
L'Anse-Saint-Jean	Municipality	RCM Le Fjord-du-Saguenay	1,301	1,201	+8.3%	501.79	2.6
L'Ascension	Municipality	RCM Antoine-Labelle	899	791	+13.7%	334.82	2.7
L'Ascension-de-Notre-Seigneur	Parish	RCM Lac-Saint-Jean-Est	2,079	1,987	+4.6%	130.84	15.9
L'Ascension-de-Patapédia	Municipality	RCM Avignon	148	164	−9.8%	95.98	1.5
L'Assomption	Town	RCM L'Assomption	23,442	22,429	+4.5%	98.74	237.4
L'Avenir	Municipality	RCM Drummond	1,350	1,307	+3.3%	97.59	13.8
L'Épiphanie	Town	RCM L'Assomption	8,883	8,693	+2.2%	56.57	157.0
L'Île-Cadieux	Town	RCM Vaudreuil-Soulanges	120	126	−4.8%	0.59	203.4
L'Île-d'Anticosti	Municipality	RCM Minganie	177	218	−18.8%	7,715.99	0.0
L'Île-Dorval	Town	Urban agglomeration of Montreal	30	5	+500.0%	0.19	157.9
L'Île-du-Grand-Calumet	Municipality	RCM Pontiac	648	626	+3.5%	130.55	5.0
L'Île-Perrot	Town	RCM Vaudreuil-Soulanges	11,638	10,756	+8.2%	5.46	2,131.5
L'Isle-aux-Allumettes	Municipality	RCM Pontiac	1,382	1,334	+3.6%	185.94	7.4
L'Isle-aux-Coudres	Municipality	RCM Charlevoix	1,116	1,143	−2.4%	29.46	37.9
L'Isle-Verte	Municipality	RCM Rivière-du-Loup	1,356	1,294	+4.8%	119.15	11.4
L'Islet	Municipality	RCM L'Islet	3,803	3,827	−0.6%	119.95	31.7
La Bostonnais	Municipality	Urban agglomeration of La Tuque	556	635	−12.4%	284.32	2.0
La Conception	Municipality	RCM Les Laurentides	1,527	1,337	+14.2%	127.37	12.0
La Corne	Municipality	RCM Abitibi	778	719	+8.2%	308.13	2.5
La Doré	Parish	RCM Le Domaine-du-Roy	1,359	1,365	−0.4%	288.55	4.7
La Durantaye	Parish	RCM Bellechasse	782	755	+3.6%	34.99	22.3
La Guadeloupe	Village	RCM Beauce-Sartigan	1,805	1,707	+5.7%	32.84	55.0
La Macaza	Municipality	RCM Antoine-Labelle	1,094	1,150	−4.9%	161.42	6.8
La Malbaie	Town	RCM Charlevoix-Est	8,235	8,271	−0.4%	458.19	18.0
La Martre	Municipality	RCM La Haute-Gaspésie	194	243	−20.2%	175.23	1.1
La Minerve	Municipality	RCM Les Laurentides	1,421	1,205	+17.9%	274.92	5.2
La Morandière-Rochebaucourt	Municipality	RCM Abitibi	351	338	+3.8%	590.98	0.6
La Motte	Municipality	RCM Abitibi	478	453	+5.5%	175.48	2.7
La Patrie	Municipality	RCM Le Haut-Saint-François	805	768	+4.8%	204.61	3.9
La Pêche	Municipality	RCM Les Collines-de-l'Outaouais	8,636	7,863	+9.8%	577.18	15.0
La Pocatière	Town	RCM Kamouraska	6,197	6,316	−1.9%	178.72	34.7
La Prairie	Town	RCM Roussillon	26,406	24,110	+9.5%	43.47	607.5
La Présentation	Municipality	RCM Les Maskoutains	2,638	2,540	+3.9%	94.39	27.9
La Rédemption	Parish	RCM La Mitis	384	432	−11.1%	116.63	3.3
La Reine	Municipality	RCM Abitibi-Ouest	307	339	−9.4%	97.63	3.1
La Sarre	Town	RCM Abitibi-Ouest	7,358	7,282	+1.0%	148.36	49.6
La Trinité-des-Monts	Parish	RCM Rimouski-Neigette	233	223	+4.5%	233.07	1.0
La Tuque	Town	Urban agglomeration of La Tuque	11,129	11,001	+1.2%	24,809.4	0.4
La Visitation-de-l'Île-Dupas	Municipality	RCM D'Autray	684	626	+9.3%	28.15	24.3
La Visitation-de-Yamaska	Municipality	RCM Nicolet-Yamaska	295	327	−9.8%	42.65	6.9
Labelle	Municipality	RCM Les Laurentides	2,765	2,477	+11.6%	196.69	14.1
Labrecque	Municipality	RCM Lac-Saint-Jean-Est	1,328	1,321	+0.5%	152.67	8.7
Lac-au-Saumon	Municipality	RCM La Matapédia	1,488	1,450	+2.6%	81.05	18.4
Lac-aux-Sables	Parish	RCM Mékinac	1,380	1,292	+6.8%	269.7	5.1
Lac-Beauport	Municipality	RCM La Jacques-Cartier	8,164	7,801	+4.7%	61.73	132.3
Lac-Bouchette	Municipality	RCM Le Domaine-du-Roy	1,183	1,196	−1.1%	904.26	1.3
Lac-Brome	Town	RCM Brome-Missisquoi	5,923	5,495	+7.8%	206.9	28.6
Lac-Delage	Town	RCM La Jacques-Cartier	771	638	+20.8%	1.58	488.0
Lac-des-Aigles	Town	RCM Témiscouata	571	566	+0.9%	226.17	2.5
Lac-des-Écorces	Municipality	RCM Antoine-Labelle	2,885	2,734	+5.5%	144.3	20.0
Lac-des-Plages	Municipality	RCM Papineau	548	431	+27.1%	150.95	3.6
Lac-des-Seize-Îles	Municipality	RCM Les Pays-d'en-Haut	175	192	−8.9%	8.88	19.7
Lac-Drolet	Municipality	RCM Le Granit	1,067	1,021	+4.5%	124.3	8.6
Lac-du-Cerf	Municipality	RCM Antoine-Labelle	445	435	+2.3%	71.73	6.2
Lac-Édouard	Municipality	Urban agglomeration of La Tuque	220	191	+15.2%	898.32	0.2
Lac-Etchemin	Municipality	RCM Les Etchemins	4,028	3,822	+5.4%	157.22	25.6
Lac-Frontière	Municipality	RCM Montmagny	175	184	−4.9%	49.96	3.5
Lac-Mégantic	Town	RCM Le Granit	5,747	5,654	+1.6%	21.98	261.5
Lac-Poulin	Village	RCM Beauce-Sartigan	171	147	+16.3%	0.88	194.3
Lac-Saguay	Village	RCM Antoine-Labelle	526	459	+14.6%	171.88	3.1
Lac-Saint-Joseph	Town	RCM La Jacques-Cartier	304	260	+16.9%	33.65	9.0
Lac-Saint-Paul	Municipality	RCM Antoine-Labelle	525	481	+9.1%	170.72	3.1
Lac-Sainte-Marie	Municipality	RCM La Vallée-de-la-Gatineau	677	566	+19.6%	205.71	3.3
Lac-Sergent	Town	RCM Portneuf	541	497	+8.9%	3.72	145.4
Lac-Simon	Municipality	RCM Papineau	1,057	944	+12.0%	95.65	11.1
Lac-Supérieur	Municipality	RCM Les Laurentides	1,972	1,888	+4.4%	365.98	5.4
Lac-Tremblant-Nord	Municipality	RCM Les Laurentides	60	42	+42.9%	20.62	2.9
Lachute	Town	RCM Argenteuil	14,100	12,862	+9.6%	108.66	129.8
Lacolle	Municipality	RCM Le Haut-Richelieu	2,708	2,596	+4.3%	49.41	54.8
Laforce	Municipality	RCM Témiscamingue	320	231	+38.5%	436.78	0.7
Lamarche	Municipality	RCM Lac-Saint-Jean-Est	476	514	−7.4%	81.45	5.8
Lambton	Municipality	RCM Le Granit	1,630	1,617	+0.8%	108.45	15.0
Landrienne	Township	RCM Abitibi	897	967	−7.2%	275.93	3.3
Lanoraie	Municipality	RCM D'Autray	5,134	4,787	+7.2%	102.74	50.0
Lantier	Municipality	RCM Les Laurentides	891	834	+6.8%	48.19	18.5
Larouche	Municipality	RCM Le Fjord-du-Saguenay	1,601	1,486	+7.7%	84.71	18.9
Latulipe-et-Gaboury	United township	RCM Témiscamingue	320	295	+8.5%	270.11	1.2
Launay	Township	RCM Abitibi	211	218	−3.2%	257.8	0.8
Laurier-Station	Village	RCM Lotbinière	2,570	2,573	−0.1%	12.16	211.3
Laurierville	Municipality	RCM L'Érable	1,313	1,346	−2.5%	107.91	12.2
Laval	Town	Equivalent territory	438,366	422,993	+3.6%	246.13	1,781.0
Lavaltrie	Town	RCM D'Autray	14,425	13,657	+5.6%	68.22	211.4
Laverlochère-Angliers	Municipality	RCM Témiscamingue	947	978	−3.2%	400.83	2.4
Lawrenceville	Village	RCM Le Val-Saint-François	618	635	−2.7%	16.73	36.9
Lebel-sur-Quévillon	Town	Jamésie TE	2,091	2,187	−4.4%	44.41	47.1
Leclercville	Municipality	RCM Lotbinière	491	473	+3.8%	136.61	3.6
Lefebvre	Municipality	RCM Drummond	925	904	+2.3%	66.18	14.0
Lejeune	Municipality	RCM Témiscouata	246	262	−6.1%	270.13	0.9
Lemieux	Municipality	RCM Bécancour	292	301	−3.0%	74.6	3.9
Léry	Town	RCM Roussillon	2,390	2,318	+3.1%	10.36	230.7
Les Bergeronnes	Municipality	RCM La Haute-Côte-Nord	619	661	−6.4%	268.77	2.3
Les Cèdres	Municipality	RCM Vaudreuil-Soulanges	7,184	6,777	+6.0%	77.63	92.5
Les Coteaux	Municipality	RCM Vaudreuil-Soulanges	5,643	5,368	+5.1%	11.64	484.8
Les Éboulements	Municipality	RCM Charlevoix	1,465	1,331	+10.1%	156.19	9.4
Les Escoumins	Municipality	RCM La Haute-Côte-Nord	1,794	1,891	−5.1%	265.89	6.7
Les Hauteurs	Municipality	RCM La Mitis	485	504	−3.8%	102.92	4.7
Les Îles-de-la-Madeleine	Municipality	Urban agglomeration of Les Îles-de-la-Madeleine	12,190	12,010	+1.5%	155.06	78.6
Les Méchins	Municipality	RCM La Matanie	995	987	+0.8%	441.39	2.3
Lévis	Town	Equivalent territory	149,683	143,414	+4.4%	448.07	334.1
Lingwick	Township	RCM Le Haut-Saint-François	456	428	+6.5%	243.01	1.9
Litchfield	Municipality	RCM Pontiac	500	459	+8.9%	198.57	2.5
Lochaber	Township	RCM Papineau	446	415	+7.5%	62.14	7.2
Lochaber-Partie-Ouest	Township	RCM Papineau	926	856	+8.2%	57.39	16.1
Longue-Pointe-de-Mingan	Municipality	RCM Minganie	408	434	−6.0%	370.03	1.1
Longue-Rive	Municipality	RCM La Haute-Côte-Nord	918	1,026	−10.5%	308.06	3.0
Longueuil	Town	Urban agglomeration of Longueuil	254,483	239,897	+6.1%	115.77	2,198.2
Lorraine	Town	RCM Thérèse-De Blainville	9,502	9,352	+1.6%	5.90	1,610.5
Lorrainville	Municipality	RCM Témiscamingue	1,286	1,272	+1.1%	87.91	14.6
Lotbinière	Municipality	RCM Lotbinière	855	812	+5.3%	79.91	10.7
Louiseville	Town	RCM Maskinongé	7,340	7,152	+2.6%	62.59	117.3
Low	Township	RCM La Vallée-de-la-Gatineau	1,020	982	+3.9%	257.78	4.0
Lyster	Municipality	RCM L'Érable	1,587	1,605	−1.1%	167.55	9.5
Macamic	Town	RCM Abitibi-Ouest	2,744	2,751	−0.3%	202.05	13.6
Maddington Falls	Municipality	RCM Arthabaska	428	413	+3.6%	23.82	18.0
Magog	Town	RCM Memphrémagog	28,312	26,669	+6.2%	144.26	196.3
Malartic	Town	RCM La Vallée-de-l'Or	3,355	3,377	−0.7%	147.45	22.8
Mandeville	Municipality	RCM D'Autray	2,363	2,189	+7.9%	318.21	7.4
Maniwaki	Town	RCM La Vallée-de-la-Gatineau	3,757	3,843	−2.2%	5.67	662.6
Manseau	Municipality	RCM Bécancour	807	816	−1.1%	104.48	7.7
Mansfield-et-Pontefract	Municipality	RCM Pontiac	2,250	2,285	−1.5%	466.61	4.8
Maria	Municipality	RCM Avignon	2,760	2,615	+5.5%	94.88	29.1
Maricourt	Municipality	RCM Le Val-Saint-François	456	416	+9.6%	61.1	7.5
Marieville	Town	RCM Rouville	11,332	10,725	+5.7%	63.23	179.2
Marsoui	Village	RCM La Haute-Gaspésie	289	275	+5.1%	181.4	1.6
Marston	Township	RCM Le Granit	777	705	+10.2%	71.83	10.8
Martinville	Municipality	RCM Coaticook	441	436	+1.1%	47.66	9.3
Mascouche	Town	RCM Les Moulins	51,183	46,692	+9.6%	106.89	478.8
Maskinongé	Municipality	RCM Maskinongé	2,323	2,319	+0.2%	73.31	31.7
Massueville	Village	RCM Pierre-De Saurel	547	529	+3.4%	1.55	352.9
Matagami	Town	Jamésie TE	1,402	1,453	−3.5%	75.12	18.7
Matane	Town	RCM La Matanie	13,987	14,311	−2.3%	195.49	71.5
Matapédia	Municipality	RCM Avignon	566	645	−12.2%	71.59	7.9
Mayo	Municipality	RCM Papineau	704	601	+17.1%	72.51	9.7
McMasterville	Town	RCM La Vallée-du-Richelieu	5,936	5,698	+4.2%	3.12	1,902.6
Melbourne	Township	RCM Le Val-Saint-François	1,096	1,063	+3.1%	173.93	6.3
Mercier	Town	RCM Roussillon	14,626	13,115	+11.5%	45.96	318.2
Messines	Municipality	RCM La Vallée-de-la-Gatineau	1,655	1,609	+2.9%	110.11	15.0
Métabetchouan--Lac-à-la-Croix	Town	RCM Lac-Saint-Jean-Est	4,121	3,985	+3.4%	187.49	22.0
Métis-sur-Mer	Town	RCM La Mitis	594	572	+3.8%	48.22	12.3
Milan	Municipality	RCM Le Granit	318	299	+6.4%	129.44	2.5
Mille-Isles	Municipality	RCM Argenteuil	1,721	1,567	+9.8%	58.73	29.3
Mirabel	Town	Equivalent territory	61,108	50,513	+21.0%	484.09	126.2
Mistissini	Cree village	Eeyou Istchee TE	10	0	NA	488.03	0.0
Moffet	Municipality	RCM Témiscamingue	206	187	+10.2%	340.31	0.6
Mont-Blanc	Municipality	RCM Les Laurentides	3,780	3,499	+8.0%	120.21	31.4
Mont-Carmel	Municipality	RCM Kamouraska	1,160	1,127	+2.9%	428.26	2.7
Mont-Joli	Town	RCM La Mitis	6,384	6,281	+1.6%	24.24	263.4
Mont-Laurier	Town	RCM Antoine-Labelle	14,180	14,116	+0.5%	587.42	24.1
Mont-Royal	Town	Urban agglomeration of Montreal	20,953	20,276	+3.3%	7.55	2,775.2
Mont-Saint-Grégoire	Municipality	RCM Le Haut-Richelieu	3,136	3,077	+1.9%	79.83	39.3
Mont-Saint-Hilaire	Town	RCM La Vallée-du-Richelieu	18,859	18,585	+1.5%	44.08	427.8
Mont-Saint-Michel	Municipality	RCM Antoine-Labelle	581	576	+0.9%	138.16	4.2
Mont-Saint-Pierre	Village	RCM La Haute-Gaspésie	186	155	+20.0%	52.07	3.6
Mont-Tremblant	Town	RCM Les Laurentides	10,992	9,646	+14.0%	233.75	47.0
Montcalm	Municipality	RCM Les Laurentides	632	628	+0.6%	117.71	5.4
Montcerf-Lytton	Municipality	RCM La Vallée-de-la-Gatineau	653	636	+2.7%	354.64	1.8
Montebello	Municipality	RCM Papineau	934	983	−5.0%	8.60	108.6
Montmagny	Town	RCM Montmagny	10,999	11,255	−2.3%	124.44	88.4
Montpellier	Municipality	RCM Papineau	1,112	985	+12.9%	246.12	4.5
Montréal	Town	Urban agglomeration of Montreal	1,762,949	1,704,694	+3.4%	364.74	4,833.4
Montréal-Est	Town	Urban agglomeration of Montreal	4,394	3,850	+14.1%	12.15	361.6
Montréal-Ouest	Town	Urban agglomeration of Montreal	5,115	5,050	+1.3%	1.37	3,733.6
Morin-Heights	Municipality	RCM Les Pays-d'en-Haut	4,678	4,145	+12.9%	55.96	83.6
Mulgrave-et-Derry	Municipality	RCM Papineau	461	369	+24.9%	289.52	1.6
Murdochville	Town	RCM La Côte-de-Gaspé	643	651	−1.2%	60.84	10.6
Namur	Municipality	RCM Papineau	633	572	+10.7%	56.17	11.3
Nantes	Municipality	RCM Le Granit	1,388	1,377	+0.8%	119.16	11.6
Napierville	Municipality	RCM Les Jardins-de-Napierville	4,020	3,899	+3.1%	4.50	893.3
Natashquan	Municipality	RCM Minganie	262	263	−0.4%	667.91	0.4
Nédélec	Township	RCM Témiscamingue	340	356	−4.5%	371.49	0.9
Nemaska	Cree village	Eeyou Istchee TE	0	0	NA	47.89	0.0
Neuville	Town	RCM Portneuf	4,475	4,392	+1.9%	71.92	62.2
New Carlisle	Municipality	RCM Bonaventure	1,336	1,388	−3.7%	67.99	19.6
New Richmond	Town	RCM Bonaventure	3,683	3,706	−0.6%	172.5	21.4
Newport	Municipality	RCM Le Haut-Saint-François	698	733	−4.8%	270.63	2.6
Nicolet	Town	RCM Nicolet-Yamaska	8,620	8,169	+5.5%	96.11	89.7
Nominingue	Municipality	RCM Antoine-Labelle	2,255	2,137	+5.5%	303.89	7.4
Normandin	Town	RCM Maria-Chapdelaine	2,991	3,033	−1.4%	211.79	14.1
Normétal	Municipality	RCM Abitibi-Ouest	778	808	−3.7%	55.25	14.1
North Hatley	Village	RCM Memphrémagog	675	632	+6.8%	3.35	201.5
Notre-Dame-Auxiliatrice-de-Buckland	Parish	RCM Bellechasse	767	768	−0.1%	94.71	8.1
Notre-Dame-de-Bonsecours	Municipality	RCM Papineau	285	301	−5.3%	258.36	1.1
Notre-Dame-de-Ham	Municipality	RCM Arthabaska	414	411	+0.7%	31.05	13.3
Notre-Dame-de-la-Merci	Municipality	RCM Matawinie	1,097	905	+21.2%	248.58	4.4
Notre-Dame-de-la-Paix	Municipality	RCM Papineau	675	648	+4.2%	105.96	6.4
Notre-Dame-de-la-Salette	Municipality	RCM Papineau	841	727	+15.7%	113.33	7.4
Notre-Dame-de-l'Île-Perrot	Town	RCM Vaudreuil-Soulanges	11,427	10,654	+7.3%	28.06	407.2
Notre-Dame-de-Lorette	Municipality	RCM Maria-Chapdelaine	159	189	−15.9%	325.77	0.5
Notre-Dame-de-Lourdes	Municipality	RCM Joliette	3,141	2,783	+12.9%	35.59	88.3
Notre-Dame-de-Lourdes	Parish	RCM L'Érable	787	688	+14.4%	81.39	9.7
Notre-Dame-de-Montauban	Municipality	RCM Mékinac	815	745	+9.4%	162.4	5.0
Notre-Dame-de-Pontmain	Municipality	RCM Antoine-Labelle	790	782	+1.0%	259.9	3.0
Notre-Dame-de-Stanbridge	Municipality	RCM Brome-Missisquoi	691	668	+3.4%	43.89	15.7
Notre-Dame-des-Anges	Parish	Not applicable	241	318	−24.2%	0.04	6,025.0
Notre-Dame-des-Bois	Municipality	RCM Le Granit	1,028	938	+9.6%	192.51	5.3
Notre-Dame-des-Monts	Municipality	RCM Charlevoix-Est	789	791	−0.3%	57.93	13.6
Notre-Dame-des-Neiges	Municipality	RCM Les Basques	1,194	1,085	+10.0%	94.44	12.6
Notre-Dame-des-Pins	Parish	RCM Beauce-Sartigan	1,812	1,594	+13.7%	24.09	75.2
Notre-Dame-des-Prairies	Town	RCM Joliette	9,471	9,273	+2.1%	18.10	523.3
Notre-Dame-des-Sept-Douleurs	Parish	RCM Rivière-du-Loup	71	36	+97.2%	11.53	6.2
Notre-Dame-du-Bon-Conseil	Parish	RCM Drummond	885	949	−6.7%	87.49	10.1
Notre-Dame-du-Bon-Conseil	Village	RCM Drummond	1,708	1,557	+9.7%	4.20	406.7
Notre-Dame-du-Laus	Municipality	RCM Antoine-Labelle	1,730	1,558	+11.0%	849.1	2.0
Notre-Dame-du-Mont-Carmel	Parish	RCM Les Chenaux	6,121	5,751	+6.4%	128.29	47.7
Notre-Dame-du-Nord	Municipality	RCM Témiscamingue	1,090	1,052	+3.6%	74.34	14.7
Notre-Dame-du-Portage	Municipality	RCM Rivière-du-Loup	1,296	1,151	+12.6%	40.06	32.4
Notre-Dame-du-Rosaire	Municipality	RCM Montmagny	371	392	−5.4%	164.63	2.3
Notre-Dame-du-Sacré-Coeur-d'Issoudun	Parish	RCM Lotbinière	867	861	+0.7%	60.32	14.4
Nouvelle	Municipality	RCM Avignon	1,782	1,681	+6.0%	234.66	7.6
Noyan	Municipality	RCM Le Haut-Richelieu	1,418	1,392	+1.9%	44.28	32.0
Ogden	Municipality	RCM Memphrémagog	761	741	+2.7%	74.68	10.2
Oka	Municipality	RCM Deux-Montagnes	3,968	3,824	+3.8%	56.99	69.6
Orford	Township	RCM Memphrémagog	5,007	4,337	+15.4%	136.14	36.8
Ormstown	Municipality	RCM Le Haut-Saint-Laurent	3,917	3,595	+9.0%	142.24	27.5
Otter Lake	Municipality	RCM Pontiac	1,041	932	+11.7%	454.7	2.3
Otterburn Park	Town	RCM La Vallée-du-Richelieu	8,479	8,421	+0.7%	5.37	1,579.0
Oujé-Bougoumou	Cree village	Eeyou Istchee TE	0	0	NA	65.41	0.0
Packington	Parish	RCM Témiscouata	578	603	−4.1%	118.75	4.9
Padoue	Municipality	RCM La Mitis	250	245	+2.0%	66.66	3.8
Palmarolle	Municipality	RCM Abitibi-Ouest	1,386	1,409	−1.6%	117.87	11.8
Papineauville	Municipality	RCM Papineau	2,153	2,101	+2.5%	61.13	35.2
Parisville	Parish	RCM Bécancour	396	530	−25.3%	35.58	11.1
Paspébiac	Town	RCM Bonaventure	3,033	3,164	−4.1%	94.98	31.9
Percé	Town	RCM Le Rocher-Percé	3,095	3,103	−0.3%	432.81	7.2
Péribonka	Municipality	RCM Maria-Chapdelaine	489	515	−5.0%	110.3	4.4
Petit-Saguenay	Municipality	RCM Le Fjord-du-Saguenay	600	634	−5.4%	329.63	1.8
Petite-Rivière-Saint-François	Municipality	RCM Charlevoix	953	814	+17.1%	133.89	7.1
Petite-Vallée	Municipality	RCM La Côte-de-Gaspé	157	170	−7.6%	39.90	3.9
Piedmont	Municipality	RCM Les Pays-d'en-Haut	3,476	2,950	+17.8%	24.36	142.7
Pierreville	Municipality	RCM Nicolet-Yamaska	2,104	2,143	−1.8%	77.71	27.1
Pike River	Municipality	RCM Brome-Missisquoi	503	517	−2.7%	40.77	12.3
Pincourt	Town	RCM Vaudreuil-Soulanges	14,751	14,558	+1.3%	7.10	2,077.6
Piopolis	Municipality	RCM Le Granit	398	358	+11.2%	103.38	3.8
Plaisance	Municipality	RCM Papineau	1,129	1,088	+3.8%	36.21	31.2
Plessisville	Town	RCM L'Érable	9,069	9,214	−1.6%	146.11	62.1
Pohénégamook	Town	RCM Témiscouata	2,481	2,582	−3.9%	339.99	7.3
Pointe-à-la-Croix	Municipality	RCM Avignon	1,344	1,408	−4.5%	390.73	3.4
Pointe-aux-Outardes	Village	RCM Manicouagan	1,434	1,332	+7.7%	75.19	19.1
Pointe-Calumet	Municipality	RCM Deux-Montagnes	6,281	6,428	−2.3%	4.59	1,368.4
Pointe-Claire	Town	Urban agglomeration of Montreal	33,488	31,380	+6.7%	18.91	1,770.9
Pointe-des-Cascades	Village	RCM Vaudreuil-Soulanges	1,775	1,481	+19.9%	2.74	647.8
Pointe-Fortune	Municipality	RCM Vaudreuil-Soulanges	582	580	+0.3%	8.09	71.9
Pointe-Lebel	Village	RCM Manicouagan	1,817	1,918	−5.3%	85.54	21.2
Pont-Rouge	Town	RCM Portneuf	10,121	9,240	+9.5%	121.12	83.6
Pontiac	Municipality	RCM Les Collines-de-l'Outaouais	6,142	5,850	+5.0%	445.27	13.8
Port-Cartier	Town	RCM Sept-Rivières	6,516	6,799	−4.2%	1,092.75	6.0
Port-Daniel--Gascons	Municipality	RCM Le Rocher-Percé	2,271	2,210	+2.8%	300.29	7.6
Portage-du-Fort	Village	RCM Pontiac	232	234	−0.9%	4.22	55.0
Portneuf	Town	RCM Portneuf	3,329	3,187	+4.5%	109.1	30.5
Portneuf-sur-Mer	Municipality	RCM La Haute-Côte-Nord	612	641	−4.5%	181.9	3.4
Potton	Township	RCM Memphrémagog	2,012	1,852	+8.6%	260.77	7.7
Poularies	Municipality	RCM Abitibi-Ouest	662	682	−2.9%	168.19	3.9
Preissac	Municipality	RCM Abitibi	914	835	+9.5%	422.13	2.2
Prévost	Town	RCM La Rivière-du-Nord	13,692	13,002	+5.3%	34.29	399.3
Price	Village	RCM La Mitis	1,729	1,759	−1.7%	2.51	688.8
Princeville	Town	RCM L'Érable	6,218	6,001	+3.6%	195.01	31.9
Puvirnituq	Northern village	Kativik TE	2,129	1,779	+19.7%	81.61	26.1
Quaqtaq	Northern village	Kativik TE	453	403	+12.4%	25.82	17.5
Quebec City	Town	Urban agglomeration of Quebec City	549,459	531,902	+3.3%	452.3	1,214.8
Racine	Municipality	RCM Le Val-Saint-François	1,340	1,323	+1.3%	105.63	12.7
Ragueneau	Parish	RCM Manicouagan	1,314	1,343	−2.2%	179.83	7.3
Rapide-Danseur	Municipality	RCM Abitibi-Ouest	380	328	+15.9%	173.73	2.2
Rapides-des-Joachims	Municipality	RCM Pontiac	141	156	−9.6%	238.9	0.6
Rawdon	Municipality	RCM Matawinie	11,719	11,057	+6.0%	185.38	63.2
Rémigny	Municipality	RCM Témiscamingue	287	280	+2.5%	894.05	0.3
Repentigny	Town	RCM L'Assomption	86,100	84,285	+2.2%	61.52	1,399.5
Richelieu	Town	RCM Rouville	5,742	5,236	+9.7%	30.96	185.5
Richmond	Town	RCM Le Val-Saint-François	3,259	3,232	+0.8%	6.98	466.9
Rigaud	Town	RCM Vaudreuil-Soulanges	7,854	7,777	+1.0%	99.2	79.2
Rimouski	Town	RCM Rimouski-Neigette	48,935	48,664	+0.6%	339.13	144.3
Ripon	Municipality	RCM Papineau	1,735	1,542	+12.5%	129.93	13.4
Ristigouche-Sud-Est	Municipality	RCM Avignon	170	171	−0.6%	51.76	3.3
Rivière-à-Claude	Municipality	RCM La Haute-Gaspésie	141	128	+10.2%	155.95	0.9
Rivière-à-Pierre	Municipality	RCM Portneuf	625	584	+7.0%	515.62	1.2
Rivière-au-Tonnerre	Municipality	RCM Minganie	281	279	+0.7%	605.14	0.5
Rivière-Beaudette	Municipality	RCM Vaudreuil-Soulanges	2,489	2,097	+18.7%	18.48	134.7
Rivière-Bleue	Municipality	RCM Témiscouata	1,261	1,230	+2.5%	173.42	7.3
Rivière-du-Loup	Town	RCM Rivière-du-Loup	20,118	19,507	+3.1%	83.74	240.2
Rivière-Éternité	Municipality	RCM Le Fjord-du-Saguenay	414	413	+0.2%	473.17	0.9
Rivière-Héva	Municipality	RCM La Vallée-de-l'Or	1,495	1,419	+5.4%	423.27	3.5
Rivière-Ouelle	Municipality	RCM Kamouraska	995	970	+2.6%	57.50	17.3
Rivière-Rouge	Town	RCM Antoine-Labelle	4,631	4,322	+7.1%	451.43	10.3
Rivière-Saint-Jean	Municipality	RCM Minganie	227	215	+5.6%	513.36	0.4
Roberval	Town	RCM Le Domaine-du-Roy	9,840	10,046	−2.1%	151.36	65.0
Roquemaure	Municipality	RCM Abitibi-Ouest	409	395	+3.5%	120.02	3.4
Rosemère	Town	RCM Thérèse-De Blainville	14,090	13,958	+0.9%	10.68	1,319.3
Rougemont	Municipality	RCM Rouville	2,696	2,755	−2.1%	43.91	61.4
Rouyn-Noranda	Town	Equivalent territory	42,313	42,334	0.0%	5,963.57	7.1
Roxton	Township	RCM Acton	1,115	1,086	+2.7%	148.93	7.5
Roxton Falls	Village	RCM Acton	1,322	1,305	+1.3%	4.94	267.6
Roxton Pond	Municipality	RCM La Haute-Yamaska	4,224	3,809	+10.9%	97.64	43.3
Sacré-Coeur	Municipality	RCM La Haute-Côte-Nord	1,684	1,803	−6.6%	303.15	5.6
Sacré-Coeur-de-Jésus	Parish	RCM Les Appalaches	536	521	+2.9%	104.73	5.1
Saguenay	Town	Equivalent territory	144,723	145,949	−0.8%	1,124.63	128.7
Saint-Adalbert	Municipality	RCM L'Islet	460	510	−9.8%	216.16	2.1
Saint-Adelme	Parish	RCM La Matanie	484	520	−6.9%	100.58	4.8
Saint-Adelphe	Parish	RCM Mékinac	922	922	0.0%	137.08	6.7
Saint-Adolphe-d'Howard	Municipality	RCM Les Pays-d'en-Haut	3,824	3,509	+9.0%	135.8	28.2
Saint-Adrien	Municipality	RCM Les Sources	522	522	0.0%	98.52	5.3
Saint-Adrien-d'Irlande	Municipality	RCM Les Appalaches	395	399	−1.0%	53.18	7.4
Saint-Agapit	Municipality	RCM Lotbinière	4,526	4,280	+5.7%	65.4	69.2
Saint-Aimé	Municipality	RCM Pierre-De Saurel	405	461	−12.1%	60.53	6.7
Saint-Aimé-des-Lacs	Municipality	RCM Charlevoix-Est	1,158	1,095	+5.8%	91.61	12.6
Saint-Aimé-du-Lac-des-Îles	Municipality	RCM Antoine-Labelle	815	790	+3.2%	161.61	5.0
Saint-Alban	Municipality	RCM Portneuf	1,196	1,198	−0.2%	148.47	8.1
Saint-Albert	Municipality	RCM Arthabaska	1,640	1,601	+2.4%	69.43	23.6
Saint-Alexandre	Municipality	RCM Le Haut-Richelieu	2,678	2,469	+8.5%	76.27	35.1
Saint-Alexandre-de-Kamouraska	Municipality	RCM Kamouraska	2,255	2,109	+6.9%	111.4	20.2
Saint-Alexandre-des-Lacs	Parish	RCM La Matapédia	298	268	+11.2%	89.82	3.3
Saint-Alexis	Municipality	RCM Montcalm	1,370	1,308	+4.7%	43.01	31.9
Saint-Alexis-de-Matapédia	Municipality	RCM Avignon	519	500	+3.8%	84.91	6.1
Saint-Alexis-des-Monts	Parish	RCM Maskinongé	2,999	2,981	+0.6%	1,035.74	2.9
Saint-Alfred	Municipality	RCM Beauce-Centre	519	482	+7.7%	43.49	11.9
Saint-Alphonse	Municipality	RCM Bonaventure	711	699	+1.7%	112.09	6.3
Saint-Alphonse-de-Granby	Municipality	RCM La Haute-Yamaska	3,341	3,094	+8.0%	50.12	66.7
Saint-Alphonse-Rodriguez	Municipality	RCM Matawinie	3,339	3,162	+5.6%	97.54	34.2
Saint-Amable	Town	RCM Marguerite-D'Youville	13,322	12,167	+9.5%	36.77	362.3
Saint-Ambroise	Municipality	RCM Le Fjord-du-Saguenay	3,883	3,781	+2.7%	149.37	26.0
Saint-Ambroise-de-Kildare	Municipality	RCM Joliette	4,090	3,856	+6.1%	67.73	60.4
Saint-Anaclet-de-Lessard	Parish	RCM Rimouski-Neigette	3,019	3,071	−1.7%	126.37	23.9
Saint-André-Avellin	Municipality	RCM Papineau	3,562	3,749	−5.0%	137.34	25.9
Saint-André-d'Argenteuil	Municipality	RCM Argenteuil	3,053	3,020	+1.1%	97.69	31.3
Saint-André-de-Kamouraska	Municipality	RCM Kamouraska	658	658	0.0%	71.06	9.3
Saint-André-de-Restigouche	Municipality	RCM Avignon	154	161	−4.3%	143.37	1.1
Saint-André-du-Lac-Saint-Jean	Village	RCM Le Domaine-du-Roy	453	467	−3.0%	145.43	3.1
Saint-Anicet	Municipality	RCM Le Haut-Saint-Laurent	2,754	2,626	+4.9%	135.03	20.4
Saint-Anselme	Municipality	RCM Bellechasse	4,047	3,938	+2.8%	74.22	54.5
Saint-Antoine-de-l'Isle-aux-Grues	Parish	RCM Montmagny	122	144	−15.3%	23.97	5.1
Saint-Antoine-de-Tilly	Municipality	RCM Lotbinière	1,682	1,598	+5.3%	59.95	28.1
Saint-Antoine-sur-Richelieu	Municipality	RCM La Vallée-du-Richelieu	1,738	1,694	+2.6%	65.67	26.5
Saint-Antonin	Town	RCM Rivière-du-Loup	4,338	4,049	+7.1%	175.93	24.7
Saint-Apollinaire	Municipality	RCM Lotbinière	7,968	6,110	+30.4%	96.83	82.3
Saint-Armand	Municipality	RCM Brome-Missisquoi	1,228	1,205	+1.9%	83.16	14.8
Saint-Arsène	Parish	RCM Rivière-du-Loup	1,245	1,230	+1.2%	70.81	17.6
Saint-Athanase	Municipality	RCM Témiscouata	303	317	−4.4%	292.63	1.0
Saint-Aubert	Municipality	RCM L'Islet	1,441	1,474	−2.2%	98.45	14.6
Saint-Augustin	Municipality	RCM Le Golfe-du-Saint-Laurent	425	445	−4.5%	1,137.68	0.4
Saint-Augustin	Parish	RCM Maria-Chapdelaine	334	351	−4.8%	104.25	3.2
Saint-Augustin-de-Desmaures	Town	Urban agglomeration of Quebec City	19,907	18,820	+5.8%	85.8	232.0
Saint-Augustin-de-Woburn	Parish	RCM Le Granit	667	692	−3.6%	281.07	2.4
Saint-Barnabé	Parish	RCM Maskinongé	1,186	1,196	−0.8%	58.94	20.1
Saint-Barnabé-Sud	Municipality	RCM Les Maskoutains	962	861	+11.7%	57.20	16.8
Saint-Barthélemy	Parish	RCM D'Autray	2,087	1,934	+7.9%	105.36	19.8
Saint-Basile	Town	RCM Portneuf	2,709	2,621	+3.4%	98.84	27.4
Saint-Basile-le-Grand	Town	RCM La Vallée-du-Richelieu	17,053	17,059	0.0%	35.84	475.8
Saint-Benjamin	Municipality	RCM Les Etchemins	1,090	987	+10.4%	111.53	9.8
Saint-Benoît-du-Lac	Municipality	RCM Memphrémagog	43	32	+34.4%	2.18	19.7
Saint-Benoît-Labre	Municipality	RCM Beauce-Sartigan	1,617	1,630	−0.8%	85.65	18.9
Saint-Bernard	Municipality	RCM La Nouvelle-Beauce	2,535	2,321	+9.2%	90.1	28.1
Saint-Bernard-de-Lacolle	Municipality	RCM Les Jardins-de-Napierville	1,542	1,549	−0.5%	113.36	13.6
Saint-Bernard-de-Michaudville	Municipality	RCM Les Maskoutains	616	586	+5.1%	66.05	9.3
Saint-Blaise-sur-Richelieu	Municipality	RCM Le Haut-Richelieu	2,092	2,066	+1.3%	69.54	30.1
Saint-Bonaventure	Municipality	RCM Drummond	1,066	1,031	+3.4%	78.72	13.5
Saint-Boniface	Municipality	RCM Maskinongé	5,156	4,832	+6.7%	107.42	48.0
Saint-Bruno-de-Guigues	Municipality	RCM Témiscamingue	1,185	1,154	+2.7%	125.77	9.4
Saint-Bruno-de-Kamouraska	Municipality	RCM Kamouraska	515	541	−4.8%	188.44	2.7
Saint-Bruno-de-Montarville	Town	Urban agglomeration of Longueuil	26,273	26,197	+0.3%	42.85	613.1
Saint-Calixte	Municipality	RCM Montcalm	6,792	6,046	+12.3%	142.63	47.6
Saint-Camille	Township	RCM Les Sources	551	529	+4.2%	83.1	6.6
Saint-Camille-de-Lellis	Parish	RCM Les Etchemins	737	752	−2.0%	251.93	2.9
Saint-Casimir	Municipality	RCM Portneuf	1,449	1,430	+1.3%	66.5	21.8
Saint-Célestin	Municipality	RCM Nicolet-Yamaska	594	575	+3.3%	76.99	7.7
Saint-Célestin	Village	RCM Nicolet-Yamaska	892	831	+7.3%	1.41	632.6
Saint-Césaire	Town	RCM Rouville	5,972	5,877	+1.6%	83.06	71.9
Saint-Charles-Borromée	Town	RCM Joliette	15,285	13,791	+10.8%	18.48	827.1
Saint-Charles-de-Bellechasse	Municipality	RCM Bellechasse	2,583	2,396	+7.8%	93.3	27.7
Saint-Charles-de-Bourget	Municipality	RCM Le Fjord-du-Saguenay	784	736	+6.5%	62.13	12.6
Saint-Charles-Garnier	Parish	RCM La Mitis	222	240	−7.5%	84.79	2.6
Saint-Charles-sur-Richelieu	Municipality	RCM La Vallée-du-Richelieu	1,735	1,717	+1.0%	64.91	26.7
Saint-Christophe-d'Arthabaska	Parish	RCM Arthabaska	3,111	3,021	+3.0%	68.96	45.1
Saint-Chrysostome	Municipality	RCM Le Haut-Saint-Laurent	2,582	2,645	−2.4%	100.2	25.8
Saint-Claude	Municipality	RCM Le Val-Saint-François	1,141	1,185	−3.7%	118.85	9.6
Saint-Clément	Municipality	RCM Les Basques	479	460	+4.1%	86.72	5.5
Saint-Cléophas	Parish	RCM La Matapédia	321	333	−3.6%	97.22	3.3
Saint-Cléophas-de-Brandon	Municipality	RCM D'Autray	254	227	+11.9%	15.34	16.6
Saint-Clet	Municipality	RCM Vaudreuil-Soulanges	1,700	1,779	−4.4%	39.32	43.2
Saint-Colomban	Town	RCM La Rivière-du-Nord	17,740	16,019	+10.7%	92.71	191.3
Saint-Côme	Municipality	RCM Matawinie	2,583	2,193	+17.8%	164.89	15.7
Saint-Côme--Linière	Municipality	RCM Beauce-Sartigan	3,278	3,239	+1.2%	150.45	21.8
Saint-Constant	Town	RCM Roussillon	29,954	27,359	+9.5%	57.06	525.0
Saint-Cuthbert	Municipality	RCM D'Autray	1,821	1,862	−2.2%	131.72	13.8
Saint-Cyprien	Municipality	RCM Rivière-du-Loup	1,078	1,066	+1.1%	138.43	7.8
Saint-Cyprien	Parish	RCM Les Etchemins	474	490	−3.3%	93.48	5.1
Saint-Cyprien-de-Napierville	Municipality	RCM Les Jardins-de-Napierville	1,735	1,927	−10.0%	97.75	17.7
Saint-Cyrille-de-Lessard	Parish	RCM L'Islet	742	718	+3.3%	230.52	3.2
Saint-Cyrille-de-Wendover	Municipality	RCM Drummond	4,920	4,723	+4.2%	110.2	44.6
Saint-Damase	Municipality	RCM Les Maskoutains	2,447	2,473	−1.1%	79.65	30.7
Saint-Damase	Parish	RCM La Matapédia	382	356	+7.3%	116.42	3.3
Saint-Damase-de-L'Islet	Municipality	RCM L'Islet	563	552	+2.0%	247.64	2.3
Saint-Damien	Parish	RCM Matawinie	2,393	2,094	+14.3%	252.28	9.5
Saint-Damien-de-Buckland	Parish	RCM Bellechasse	1,893	1,956	−3.2%	82.04	23.1
Saint-David	Municipality	RCM Pierre-De Saurel	872	817	+6.7%	92.97	9.4
Saint-David-de-Falardeau	Municipality	RCM Le Fjord-du-Saguenay	2,996	2,768	+8.2%	398.25	7.5
Saint-Denis-De La Bouteillerie	Municipality	RCM Kamouraska	518	517	+0.2%	33.84	15.3
Saint-Denis-de-Brompton	Municipality	RCM Le Val-Saint-François	4,594	4,054	+13.3%	70.29	65.4
Saint-Denis-sur-Richelieu	Municipality	RCM La Vallée-du-Richelieu	2,339	2,308	+1.3%	84.64	27.6
Saint-Didace	Parish	RCM D'Autray	688	652	+5.5%	99.6	6.9
Saint-Dominique	Municipality	RCM Les Maskoutains	2,741	2,553	+7.4%	70.53	38.9
Saint-Dominique-du-Rosaire	Municipality	RCM Abitibi	434	450	−3.6%	479.89	0.9
Saint-Donat	Municipality	RCM Matawinie	4,561	3,888	+17.3%	350.17	13.0
Saint-Donat	Parish	RCM La Mitis	835	876	−4.7%	95.8	8.7
Saint-Edmond-de-Grantham	Municipality	RCM Drummond	804	762	+5.5%	48.29	16.6
Saint-Edmond-les-Plaines	Municipality	RCM Maria-Chapdelaine	355	381	−6.8%	84.39	4.2
Saint-Édouard	Municipality	RCM Les Jardins-de-Napierville	1,365	1,321	+3.3%	52.68	25.9
Saint-Édouard-de-Fabre	Parish	RCM Témiscamingue	671	628	+6.8%	190.29	3.5
Saint-Édouard-de-Lotbinière	Parish	RCM Lotbinière	1,240	1,194	+3.9%	98.43	12.6
Saint-Édouard-de-Maskinongé	Municipality	RCM Maskinongé	798	712	+12.1%	52.82	15.1
Saint-Élie-de-Caxton	Municipality	RCM Maskinongé	1,934	1,836	+5.3%	116.84	16.6
Saint-Éloi	Parish	RCM Les Basques	310	286	+8.4%	65.77	4.7
Saint-Elphège	Parish	RCM Nicolet-Yamaska	251	270	−7.0%	40.53	6.2
Saint-Elzéar	Municipality	RCM Bonaventure	464	458	+1.3%	204.16	2.3
Saint-Elzéar	Municipality	RCM La Nouvelle-Beauce	2,623	2,400	+9.3%	87.07	30.1
Saint-Elzéar-de-Témiscouata	Municipality	RCM Témiscouata	311	321	−3.1%	151.14	2.1
Saint-Émile-de-Suffolk	Municipality	RCM Papineau	512	477	+7.3%	55.68	9.2
Saint-Éphrem-de-Beauce	Municipality	RCM Beauce-Sartigan	2,323	2,400	−3.2%	118.9	19.5
Saint-Épiphane	Municipality	RCM Rivière-du-Loup	836	827	+1.1%	82.85	10.1
Saint-Esprit	Municipality	RCM Montcalm	2,011	1,967	+2.2%	54.19	37.1
Saint-Étienne-de-Beauharnois	Municipality	RCM Beauharnois-Salaberry	1,099	831	+32.3%	40.63	27.0
Saint-Étienne-de-Bolton	Municipality	RCM Memphrémagog	816	674	+21.1%	47.27	17.3
Saint-Étienne-des-Grès	Parish	RCM Maskinongé	4,539	4,541	0.0%	104.54	43.4
Saint-Eugène	Municipality	RCM Drummond	1,139	1,126	+1.2%	75.84	15.0
Saint-Eugène-d'Argentenay	Municipality	RCM Maria-Chapdelaine	487	488	−0.2%	87.05	5.6
Saint-Eugène-de-Guigues	Municipality	RCM Témiscamingue	458	465	−1.5%	109.52	4.2
Saint-Eugène-de-Ladrière	Parish	RCM Rimouski-Neigette	413	378	+9.3%	331.36	1.2
Saint-Eusèbe	Parish	RCM Témiscouata	587	593	−1.0%	129.56	4.5
Saint-Eustache	Town	RCM Deux-Montagnes	45,276	44,008	+2.9%	70.51	642.1
Saint-Fabien	Parish	RCM Rimouski-Neigette	1,834	1,837	−0.2%	119.92	15.3
Saint-Fabien-de-Panet	Parish	RCM Montmagny	945	954	−0.9%	187.01	5.1
Saint-Félicien	Town	RCM Le Domaine-du-Roy	10,089	10,238	−1.5%	361.27	27.9
Saint-Félix-de-Kingsey	Municipality	RCM Drummond	1,493	1,430	+4.4%	126.28	11.8
Saint-Félix-de-Valois	Municipality	RCM Matawinie	6,975	6,305	+10.6%	88.4	78.9
Saint-Félix-d'Otis	Municipality	RCM Le Fjord-du-Saguenay	1,109	956	+16.0%	233.16	4.8
Saint-Ferdinand	Municipality	RCM L'Érable	2,007	2,076	−3.3%	137.16	14.6
Saint-Ferréol-les-Neiges	Municipality	RCM La Côte-de-Beaupré	3,806	3,240	+17.5%	83.18	45.8
Saint-Flavien	Municipality	RCM Lotbinière	1,619	1,618	+0.1%	66.16	24.5
Saint-Fortunat	Municipality	RCM Les Appalaches	255	263	−3.0%	76.09	3.4
Saint-François-d'Assise	Municipality	RCM Avignon	679	644	+5.4%	179.34	3.8
Saint-François-de-la-Rivière-du-Sud	Municipality	RCM Montmagny	1,580	1,623	−2.6%	96.35	16.4
Saint-François-de-l'Île-d'Orléans	Municipality	RCM L'Île-d'Orléans	536	527	+1.7%	28.96	18.5
Saint-François-de-Sales	Municipality	RCM Le Domaine-du-Roy	643	616	+4.4%	197.2	3.3
Saint-François-du-Lac	Municipality	RCM Nicolet-Yamaska	1,898	1,965	−3.4%	63.8	29.7
Saint-François-Xavier-de-Brompton	Municipality	RCM Le Val-Saint-François	2,469	2,273	+8.6%	97.71	25.3
Saint-François-Xavier-de-Viger	Municipality	RCM Rivière-du-Loup	247	245	+0.8%	111.27	2.2
Saint-Frédéric	Parish	RCM Beauce-Centre	1,065	997	+6.8%	72.35	14.7
Saint-Fulgence	Municipality	RCM Le Fjord-du-Saguenay	2,061	2,071	−0.5%	351.91	5.9
Saint-Gabriel	Town	RCM D'Autray	2,803	2,640	+6.2%	2.81	997.5
Saint-Gabriel-de-Brandon	Municipality	RCM D'Autray	2,684	2,635	+1.9%	99.23	27.0
Saint-Gabriel-de-Rimouski	Municipality	RCM La Mitis	1,177	1,167	+0.9%	126.98	9.3
Saint-Gabriel-de-Valcartier	Municipality	RCM La Jacques-Cartier	3,223	3,382	−4.7%	432.62	7.4
Saint-Gabriel-Lalemant	Municipality	RCM Kamouraska	660	716	−7.8%	77.92	8.5
Saint-Gédéon	Municipality	RCM Lac-Saint-Jean-Est	2,177	2,085	+4.4%	63.38	34.3
Saint-Gédéon-de-Beauce	Municipality	RCM Beauce-Sartigan	2,093	2,205	−5.1%	197.37	10.6
Saint-Georges	Town	RCM Beauce-Sartigan	32,935	32,513	+1.3%	199.08	165.4
Saint-Georges-de-Windsor	Municipality	RCM Les Sources	958	958	0.0%	127.46	7.5
Saint-Gérard-Majella	Parish	RCM Pierre-De Saurel	240	242	−0.8%	38.32	6.3
Saint-Germain-de-Grantham	Municipality	RCM Drummond	4,922	4,917	+0.1%	87.47	56.3
Saint-Germain-de-Kamouraska	Municipality	RCM Kamouraska	294	286	+2.8%	28.53	10.3
Saint-Gervais	Municipality	RCM Bellechasse	2,138	2,153	−0.7%	89.33	23.9
Saint-Gilbert	Parish	RCM Portneuf	283	296	−4.4%	37.44	7.6
Saint-Gilles	Municipality	RCM Lotbinière	2,910	2,525	+15.2%	177.43	16.4
Saint-Godefroi	Township	RCM Bonaventure	350	380	−7.9%	63.57	5.5
Saint-Guillaume	Municipality	RCM Drummond	1,491	1,476	+1.0%	87.91	17.0
Saint-Henri	Municipality	RCM Bellechasse	5,813	5,611	+3.6%	122.61	47.4
Saint-Henri-de-Taillon	Municipality	RCM Lac-Saint-Jean-Est	803	826	−2.8%	61.74	13.0
Saint-Herménégilde	Municipality	RCM Coaticook	690	670	+3.0%	166.15	4.2
Saint-Hilaire-de-Dorset	Parish	RCM Beauce-Sartigan	96	95	+1.1%	186.77	0.5
Saint-Hilarion	Parish	RCM Charlevoix	1,146	1,127	+1.7%	100.3	11.4
Saint-Hippolyte	Municipality	RCM La Rivière-du-Nord	10,669	9,113	+17.1%	119.5	89.3
Saint-Honoré	Town	RCM Le Fjord-du-Saguenay	6,376	5,757	+10.8%	189.38	33.7
Saint-Honoré-de-Shenley	Municipality	RCM Beauce-Sartigan	1,555	1,517	+2.5%	133.96	11.6
Saint-Honoré-de-Témiscouata	Municipality	RCM Témiscouata	763	741	+3.0%	262.97	2.9
Saint-Hubert-de-Rivière-du-Loup	Municipality	RCM Rivière-du-Loup	1,412	1,279	+10.4%	192.2	7.3
Saint-Hugues	Municipality	RCM Les Maskoutains	1,340	1,327	+1.0%	84.64	15.8
Saint-Hyacinthe	Town	RCM Les Maskoutains	57,239	55,648	+2.9%	188.85	303.1
Saint-Ignace-de-Loyola	Municipality	RCM D'Autray	2,048	2,049	0.0%	31.90	64.2
Saint-Ignace-de-Stanbridge	Municipality	RCM Brome-Missisquoi	677	676	+0.1%	69.42	9.8
Saint-Irénée	Municipality	RCM Charlevoix-Est	678	641	+5.8%	59.92	11.3
Saint-Isidore	Municipality	RCM La Nouvelle-Beauce	3,286	2,880	+14.1%	102.61	32.0
Saint-Isidore	Parish	RCM Roussillon	2,769	2,608	+6.2%	52.29	53.0
Saint-Isidore-de-Clifton	Municipality	RCM Le Haut-Saint-François	673	695	−3.2%	176.94	3.8
Saint-Jacques	Municipality	RCM Montcalm	4,302	3,971	+8.3%	67.17	64.0
Saint-Jacques-de-Leeds	Municipality	RCM Les Appalaches	711	685	+3.8%	80.56	8.8
Saint-Jacques-le-Majeur-de-Wolfestown	Parish	RCM Les Appalaches	186	188	−1.1%	58.71	3.2
Saint-Jacques-le-Mineur	Municipality	RCM Les Jardins-de-Napierville	1,766	1,690	+4.5%	67.18	26.3
Saint-Janvier-de-Joly	Municipality	RCM Lotbinière	1,079	984	+9.7%	109.88	9.8
Saint-Jean-Baptiste	Municipality	RCM La Vallée-du-Richelieu	3,179	3,107	+2.3%	72.36	43.9
Saint-Jean-de-Brébeuf	Municipality	RCM Les Appalaches	351	372	−5.6%	79.15	4.4
Saint-Jean-de-Cherbourg	Parish	RCM La Matanie	163	165	−1.2%	113.96	1.4
Saint-Jean-de-Dieu	Municipality	RCM Les Basques	1,651	1,596	+3.4%	152.04	10.9
Saint-Jean-de-la-Lande	Municipality	RCM Témiscouata	232	248	−6.5%	107.03	2.2
Saint-Jean-de-l'Île-d'Orléans	Municipality	RCM L'Île-d'Orléans	1,026	1,059	−3.1%	43.48	23.6
Saint-Jean-de-Matha	Municipality	RCM Matawinie	4,838	4,450	+8.7%	109.49	44.2
Saint-Jean-Port-Joli	Municipality	RCM L'Islet	3,329	3,407	−2.3%	69.31	48.0
Saint-Jean-sur-Richelieu	Town	RCM Le Haut-Richelieu	97,873	95,114	+2.9%	226.93	431.3
Saint-Jérôme	Town	RCM La Rivière-du-Nord	80,213	74,346	+7.9%	90.18	889.5
Saint-Joachim	Parish	RCM La Côte-de-Beaupré	1,427	1,441	−1.0%	42.33	33.7
Saint-Joachim-de-Shefford	Municipality	RCM La Haute-Yamaska	1,476	1,301	+13.5%	126.91	11.6
Saint-Joseph-de-Beauce	Town	RCM Beauce-Centre	5,014	4,858	+3.2%	114.7	43.7
Saint-Joseph-de-Coleraine	Municipality	RCM Les Appalaches	1,820	1,762	+3.3%	126.76	14.4
Saint-Joseph-de-Kamouraska	Parish	RCM Kamouraska	398	391	+1.8%	84.96	4.7
Saint-Joseph-de-Lepage	Parish	RCM La Mitis	590	523	+12.8%	30.98	19.0
Saint-Joseph-des-Érables	Municipality	RCM Beauce-Centre	377	410	−8.0%	51.43	7.3
Saint-Joseph-de-Sorel	Town	RCM Pierre-De Saurel	1,581	1,642	−3.7%	1.36	1,162.5
Saint-Joseph-du-Lac	Municipality	RCM Deux-Montagnes	7,031	6,687	+5.1%	41.22	170.6
Saint-Jude	Municipality	RCM Les Maskoutains	1,326	1,214	+9.2%	77.33	17.1
Saint-Jules	Parish	RCM Beauce-Centre	547	539	+1.5%	55.73	9.8
Saint-Julien	Municipality	RCM Les Appalaches	378	376	+0.5%	81.7	4.6
Saint-Just-de-Bretenières	Municipality	RCM Montmagny	639	668	−4.3%	132.6	4.8
Saint-Juste-du-Lac	Municipality	RCM Témiscouata	543	561	−3.2%	166.94	3.3
Saint-Justin	Municipality	RCM Maskinongé	961	973	−1.2%	78.96	12.2
Saint-Lambert	Parish	RCM Abitibi-Ouest	191	194	−1.5%	99.81	1.9
Saint-Lambert	Town	Urban agglomeration of Longueuil	22,761	21,861	+4.1%	7.56	3,010.7
Saint-Lambert-de-Lauzon	Municipality	RCM La Nouvelle-Beauce	6,817	6,647	+2.6%	106.76	63.9
Saint-Laurent-de-l'Île-d'Orléans	Municipality	RCM L'Île-d'Orléans	1,607	1,532	+4.9%	35.64	45.1
Saint-Lazare	Town	RCM Vaudreuil-Soulanges	22,354	19,917	+12.2%	66.86	334.3
Saint-Lazare-de-Bellechasse	Municipality	RCM Bellechasse	1,332	1,288	+3.4%	85.93	15.5
Saint-Léandre	Parish	RCM La Matanie	375	400	−6.2%	104.72	3.6
Saint-Léonard-d'Aston	Municipality	RCM Nicolet-Yamaska	2,530	2,331	+8.5%	82.55	30.6
Saint-Léonard-de-Portneuf	Municipality	RCM Portneuf	1,140	1,113	+2.4%	141.8	8.0
Saint-Léon-de-Standon	Parish	RCM Bellechasse	1,042	1,127	−7.5%	136.88	7.6
Saint-Léon-le-Grand	Parish	RCM La Matapédia	968	953	+1.6%	128.26	7.5
Saint-Léon-le-Grand	Parish	RCM Maskinongé	863	928	−7.0%	75.97	11.4
Saint-Liboire	Municipality	RCM Les Maskoutains	3,036	3,062	−0.8%	73.82	41.1
Saint-Liguori	Municipality	RCM Montcalm	2,066	1,943	+6.3%	50.88	40.6
Saint-Lin--Laurentides	Town	RCM Montcalm	24,030	20,786	+15.6%	118.29	203.1
Saint-Louis	Municipality	RCM Les Maskoutains	740	712	+3.9%	47.21	15.7
Saint-Louis-de-Blandford	Municipality	RCM Arthabaska	1,076	1,011	+6.4%	104.36	10.3
Saint-Louis-de-Gonzague	Municipality	RCM Les Etchemins	390	374	+4.3%	118.01	3.3
Saint-Louis-de-Gonzague	Parish	RCM Beauharnois-Salaberry	1,950	1,481	+31.7%	77.04	25.3
Saint-Louis-de-Gonzague-du-Cap-Tourmente	Parish	RCM La Côte-de-Beaupré	0	5	−100.0%	0.42	0.0
Saint-Louis-du-Ha! Ha!	Parish	RCM Témiscouata	1,311	1,292	+1.5%	112.23	11.7
Saint-Luc-de-Bellechasse	Municipality	RCM Les Etchemins	449	438	+2.5%	161.99	2.8
Saint-Luc-de-Vincennes	Municipality	RCM Les Chenaux	519	545	−4.8%	53.78	9.7
Saint-Lucien	Municipality	RCM Drummond	1,801	1,647	+9.4%	110.99	16.2
Saint-Ludger	Municipality	RCM Le Granit	1,074	1,071	+0.3%	127.58	8.4
Saint-Ludger-de-Milot	Municipality	RCM Lac-Saint-Jean-Est	637	651	−2.2%	107.46	5.9
Saint-Magloire	Municipality	RCM Les Etchemins	712	676	+5.3%	208.61	3.4
Saint-Majorique-de-Grantham	Parish	RCM Drummond	1,384	1,388	−0.3%	57.5	24.1
Saint-Malachie	Parish	RCM Bellechasse	1,667	1,517	+9.9%	101.07	16.5
Saint-Malo	Municipality	RCM Coaticook	514	475	+8.2%	131.83	3.9
Saint-Marc-de-Figuery	Parish	RCM Abitibi	868	834	+4.1%	80.79	10.7
Saint-Marc-des-Carrières	Town	RCM Portneuf	2,901	2,911	−0.3%	17.29	167.8
Saint-Marc-du-Lac-Long	Parish	RCM Témiscouata	365	397	−8.1%	148.64	2.5
Saint-Marcel	Municipality	RCM L'Islet	422	428	−1.4%	178.83	2.4
Saint-Marcel-de-Richelieu	Municipality	RCM Les Maskoutains	507	497	+2.0%	51.27	9.9
Saint-Marcellin	Parish	RCM Rimouski-Neigette	397	353	+12.5%	117.19	3.4
Saint-Marc-sur-Richelieu	Municipality	RCM La Vallée-du-Richelieu	2,245	2,172	+3.4%	60.92	36.9
Saint-Martin	Parish	RCM Beauce-Sartigan	2,588	2,477	+4.5%	118	21.9
Saint-Mathias-sur-Richelieu	Municipality	RCM Rouville	4,544	4,531	+0.3%	47.02	96.6
Saint-Mathieu	Municipality	RCM Roussillon	2,339	2,156	+8.5%	31.41	74.5
Saint-Mathieu-de-Beloeil	Municipality	RCM La Vallée-du-Richelieu	2,952	2,619	+12.7%	39.39	74.9
Saint-Mathieu-de-Rioux	Municipality	RCM Les Basques	691	639	+8.1%	107.27	6.4
Saint-Mathieu-d'Harricana	Municipality	RCM Abitibi	770	739	+4.2%	105.86	7.3
Saint-Mathieu-du-Parc	Municipality	RCM Maskinongé	1,482	1,338	+10.8%	218.85	6.8
Saint-Maurice	Parish	RCM Les Chenaux	3,432	3,286	+4.4%	91.36	37.6
Saint-Maxime-du-Mont-Louis	Municipality	RCM La Haute-Gaspésie	1,047	1,134	−7.7%	232.67	4.5
Saint-Médard	Municipality	RCM Les Basques	216	209	+3.3%	75.28	2.9
Saint-Michel	Municipality	RCM Les Jardins-de-Napierville	3,521	3,186	+10.5%	59.82	58.9
Saint-Michel-de-Bellechasse	Municipality	RCM Bellechasse	1,871	1,813	+3.2%	43.08	43.4
Saint-Michel-des-Saints	Municipality	RCM Matawinie	2,496	2,359	+5.8%	493.92	5.1
Saint-Michel-du-Squatec	Municipality	RCM Témiscouata	1,076	1,113	−3.3%	361.23	3.0
Saint-Modeste	Municipality	RCM Rivière-du-Loup	1,180	1,162	+1.5%	109.72	10.8
Saint-Moïse	Parish	RCM La Matapédia	542	580	−6.6%	109.8	4.9
Saint-Narcisse	Parish	RCM Les Chenaux	1,801	1,832	−1.7%	106.74	16.9
Saint-Narcisse-de-Beaurivage	Parish	RCM Lotbinière	1,152	1,106	+4.2%	62.07	18.6
Saint-Narcisse-de-Rimouski	Parish	RCM Rimouski-Neigette	1,084	961	+12.8%	162.4	6.7
Saint-Nazaire	Municipality	RCM Lac-Saint-Jean-Est	2,029	2,073	−2.1%	144.76	14.0
Saint-Nazaire-d'Acton	Parish	RCM Acton	880	884	−0.5%	58.04	15.2
Saint-Nazaire-de-Dorchester	Parish	RCM Bellechasse	338	363	−6.9%	51.56	6.6
Saint-Nérée-de-Bellechasse	Municipality	RCM Bellechasse	744	742	+0.3%	75.76	9.8
Saint-Noël	Village	RCM La Matapédia	392	398	−1.5%	45.80	8.6
Saint-Norbert	Parish	RCM D'Autray	1,060	1,003	+5.7%	74.6	14.2
Saint-Norbert-d'Arthabaska	Municipality	RCM Arthabaska	1,247	1,157	+7.8%	102.98	12.1
Saint-Octave-de-Métis	Parish	RCM La Mitis	493	511	−3.5%	75.16	6.6
Saint-Odilon-de-Cranbourne	Municipality	RCM Beauce-Centre	1,407	1,374	+2.4%	130.61	10.8
Saint-Omer	Municipality	RCM L'Islet	294	277	+6.1%	122.44	2.4
Saint-Ours	Town	RCM Pierre-De Saurel	1,723	1,669	+3.2%	59.23	29.1
Saint-Pacôme	Municipality	RCM Kamouraska	1,806	1,598	+13.0%	29.06	62.1
Saint-Pamphile	Town	RCM L'Islet	2,274	2,400	−5.2%	137.78	16.5
Saint-Pascal	Town	RCM Kamouraska	3,530	3,468	+1.8%	59.68	59.1
Saint-Patrice-de-Beaurivage	Municipality	RCM Lotbinière	1,109	1,036	+7.0%	85.73	12.9
Saint-Patrice-de-Sherrington	Municipality	RCM Les Jardins-de-Napierville	1,963	1,960	+0.2%	92.55	21.2
Saint-Paul	Municipality	RCM Joliette	6,566	5,891	+11.5%	49.11	133.7
Saint-Paul-d'Abbotsford	Municipality	RCM Rouville	2,886	2,890	−0.1%	79.6	36.3
Saint-Paul-de-la-Croix	Municipality	RCM Rivière-du-Loup	313	309	+1.3%	78.42	4.0
Saint-Paul-de-l'Île-aux-Noix	Municipality	RCM Le Haut-Richelieu	2,141	1,980	+8.1%	29.85	71.7
Saint-Paul-de-Montminy	Municipality	RCM Montmagny	849	785	+8.2%	162.77	5.2
Saint-Paulin	Municipality	RCM Maskinongé	1,541	1,497	+2.9%	95.41	16.2
Saint-Philémon	Parish	RCM Bellechasse	680	714	−4.8%	146.51	4.6
Saint-Philibert	Municipality	RCM Beauce-Sartigan	379	369	+2.7%	57.16	6.6
Saint-Philippe	Town	RCM Roussillon	7,597	6,320	+20.2%	61.96	122.6
Saint-Philippe-de-Néri	Parish	RCM Kamouraska	818	832	−1.7%	32.65	25.1
Saint-Pie	Town	RCM Les Maskoutains	5,847	5,607	+4.3%	107.42	54.4
Saint-Pie-de-Guire	Parish	RCM Drummond	446	450	−0.9%	51.27	8.7
Saint-Pierre	Village	RCM Joliette	286	276	+3.6%	9.68	29.5
Saint-Pierre-Baptiste	Parish	RCM L'Érable	560	527	+6.3%	81.77	6.8
Saint-Pierre-de-Broughton	Municipality	RCM Les Appalaches	889	898	−1.0%	150.56	5.9
Saint-Pierre-de-Lamy	Municipality	RCM Témiscouata	122	117	+4.3%	110.63	1.1
Saint-Pierre-de-la-Rivière-du-Sud	Parish	RCM Montmagny	840	907	−7.4%	91.05	9.2
Saint-Pierre-de-l'Île-d'Orléans	Municipality	RCM L'Île-d'Orléans	1,743	1,993	−12.5%	31.64	55.1
Saint-Pierre-les-Becquets	Municipality	RCM Bécancour	1,183	1,137	+4.0%	48.14	24.6
Saint-Placide	Municipality	RCM Deux-Montagnes	1,784	1,686	+5.8%	42.89	41.6
Saint-Polycarpe	Municipality	RCM Vaudreuil-Soulanges	2,372	2,224	+6.7%	69.88	33.9
Saint-Prime	Municipality	RCM Le Domaine-du-Roy	2,760	2,753	+0.3%	147.16	18.8
Saint-Prosper	Municipality	RCM Les Etchemins	3,596	3,590	+0.2%	133.74	26.9
Saint-Prosper-de-Champlain	Municipality	RCM Les Chenaux	482	530	−9.1%	94.11	5.1
Saint-Raphaël	Municipality	RCM Bellechasse	2,458	2,390	+2.8%	121.69	20.2
Saint-Raymond	Town	RCM Portneuf	11,108	10,358	+7.2%	666.2	16.7
Saint-Rémi	Town	RCM Les Jardins-de-Napierville	8,957	8,061	+11.1%	78.18	114.6
Saint-Rémi-de-Tingwick	Municipality	RCM Arthabaska	446	458	−2.6%	72.97	6.1
Saint-René	Parish	RCM Beauce-Sartigan	946	745	+27.0%	61.54	15.4
Saint-René-de-Matane	Municipality	RCM La Matanie	961	991	−3.0%	253.89	3.8
Saint-Robert	Municipality	RCM Pierre-De Saurel	1,813	1,803	+0.6%	64.97	27.9
Saint-Robert-Bellarmin	Municipality	RCM Le Granit	529	575	−8.0%	236.33	2.2
Saint-Roch-de-l'Achigan	Municipality	RCM Montcalm	5,453	5,147	+5.9%	80.06	68.1
Saint-Roch-de-Mékinac	Parish	RCM Mékinac	304	302	+0.7%	144.52	2.1
Saint-Roch-de-Richelieu	Municipality	RCM Pierre-De Saurel	2,573	2,188	+17.6%	34.44	74.7
Saint-Roch-des-Aulnaies	Municipality	RCM L'Islet	955	917	+4.1%	49.14	19.4
Saint-Roch-Ouest	Municipality	RCM Montcalm	262	266	−1.5%	20.14	13.0
Saint-Romain	Municipality	RCM Le Granit	711	691	+2.9%	112.12	6.3
Saint-Rosaire	Parish	RCM Arthabaska	932	843	+10.6%	109.53	8.5
Saint-Samuel	Municipality	RCM Arthabaska	765	744	+2.8%	43.21	17.7
Saint-Sauveur	Town	RCM Les Pays-d'en-Haut	11,580	10,231	+13.2%	47.62	243.2
Saint-Sébastien	Municipality	RCM Le Granit	674	657	+2.6%	91.95	7.3
Saint-Sébastien	Municipality	RCM Le Haut-Richelieu	692	718	−3.6%	63.29	10.9
Saint-Sévère	Parish	RCM Maskinongé	337	302	+11.6%	31.85	10.6
Saint-Séverin	Parish	RCM Mékinac	812	846	−4.0%	61.65	13.2
Saint-Séverin	Parish	RCM Beauce-Centre	300	278	+7.9%	58.92	5.1
Saint-Siméon	Municipality	RCM Charlevoix-Est	1,139	1,227	−7.2%	281.14	4.1
Saint-Siméon	Parish	RCM Bonaventure	1,207	1,171	+3.1%	56.71	21.3
Saint-Simon	Municipality	RCM Les Maskoutains	1,386	1,413	−1.9%	69.05	20.1
Saint-Simon-de-Rimouski	Municipality	RCM Les Basques	455	426	+6.8%	74.84	6.1
Saint-Simon-les-Mines	Municipality	RCM Beauce-Sartigan	573	549	+4.4%	47.43	12.1
Saint-Sixte	Municipality	RCM Papineau	490	469	+4.5%	84.34	5.8
Saint-Stanislas	Municipality	RCM Les Chenaux	1,001	1,010	−0.9%	89.38	11.2
Saint-Stanislas	Municipality	RCM Maria-Chapdelaine	376	373	+0.8%	153.58	2.4
Saint-Stanislas-de-Kostka	Municipality	RCM Beauharnois-Salaberry	1,852	1,654	+12.0%	57.69	32.1
Saint-Sulpice	Parish	RCM L'Assomption	3,360	3,439	−2.3%	36.17	92.9
Saint-Sylvère	Municipality	RCM Bécancour	786	791	−0.6%	86.3	9.1
Saint-Sylvestre	Municipality	RCM Lotbinière	1,019	1,019	0.0%	147.15	6.9
Saint-Télesphore	Municipality	RCM Vaudreuil-Soulanges	754	759	−0.7%	60.1	12.5
Saint-Tharcisius	Parish	RCM La Matapédia	411	421	−2.4%	78.84	5.2
Saint-Théodore-d'Acton	Municipality	RCM Acton	1,564	1,519	+3.0%	82.82	18.9
Saint-Théophile	Municipality	RCM Beauce-Sartigan	702	713	−1.5%	427.78	1.6
Saint-Thomas	Municipality	RCM Joliette	3,496	3,249	+7.6%	94.57	37.0
Saint-Thomas-Didyme	Municipality	RCM Maria-Chapdelaine	703	676	+4.0%	333.25	2.1
Saint-Thuribe	Parish	RCM Portneuf	298	286	+4.2%	51.00	5.8
Saint-Tite	Town	RCM Mékinac	3,672	3,673	0.0%	91.1	40.3
Saint-Tite-des-Caps	Municipality	RCM La Côte-de-Beaupré	1,504	1,473	+2.1%	129.3	11.6
Saint-Ubalde	Municipality	RCM Portneuf	1,456	1,412	+3.1%	140.72	10.3
Saint-Ulric	Municipality	RCM La Matanie	1,567	1,585	−1.1%	120.45	13.0
Saint-Urbain	Parish	RCM Charlevoix	1,320	1,373	−3.9%	330.57	4.0
Saint-Urbain-Premier	Municipality	RCM Beauharnois-Salaberry	1,332	1,264	+5.4%	53.28	25.0
Saint-Valentin	Municipality	RCM Le Haut-Richelieu	418	447	−6.5%	39.27	10.6
Saint-Valère	Municipality	RCM Arthabaska	1,188	1,263	−5.9%	108.1	11.0
Saint-Valérien	Parish	RCM Rimouski-Neigette	906	835	+8.5%	145.02	6.2
Saint-Valérien-de-Milton	Municipality	RCM Les Maskoutains	1,767	1,793	−1.5%	106.92	16.5
Saint-Vallier	Municipality	RCM Bellechasse	1,031	1,061	−2.8%	44.88	23.0
Saint-Venant-de-Paquette	Municipality	RCM Coaticook	69	97	−28.9%	58.75	1.2
Saint-Vianney	Municipality	RCM La Matapédia	446	441	+1.1%	145.6	3.1
Saint-Victor	Municipality	RCM Beauce-Centre	2,313	2,448	−5.5%	120.45	19.2
Saint-Wenceslas	Municipality	RCM Nicolet-Yamaska	1,167	1,157	+0.9%	79.57	14.7
Saint-Zacharie	Municipality	RCM Les Etchemins	1,684	1,653	+1.9%	186.56	9.0
Saint-Zénon	Municipality	RCM Matawinie	1,317	1,120	+17.6%	460.41	2.9
Saint-Zénon-du-Lac-Humqui	Parish	RCM La Matapédia	370	359	+3.1%	113.09	3.3
Saint-Zéphirin-de-Courval	Parish	RCM Nicolet-Yamaska	707	700	+1.0%	71.94	9.8
Saint-Zotique	Town	RCM Vaudreuil-Soulanges	9,618	7,934	+21.2%	25.04	384.1
Sainte-Adèle	Town	RCM Les Pays-d'en-Haut	14,010	12,919	+8.4%	119.67	117.1
Sainte-Agathe-de-Lotbinière	Municipality	RCM Lotbinière	1,049	1,168	−10.2%	166.99	6.3
Sainte-Agathe-des-Monts	Town	RCM Les Laurentides	11,211	10,223	+9.7%	129.1	86.8
Sainte-Angèle-de-Mérici	Municipality	RCM La Mitis	989	953	+3.8%	107.78	9.2
Sainte-Angèle-de-Monnoir	Municipality	RCM Rouville	1,828	1,823	+0.3%	44.80	40.8
Sainte-Angèle-de-Prémont	Municipality	RCM Maskinongé	631	596	+5.9%	37.73	16.7
Sainte-Anne-de-Beaupré	Town	RCM La Côte-de-Beaupré	2,888	2,880	+0.3%	62.38	46.3
Sainte-Anne-de-Bellevue	Town	Urban agglomeration of Montreal	5,027	4,958	+1.4%	10.46	480.6
Sainte-Anne-de-la-Pérade	Municipality	RCM Les Chenaux	2,031	2,019	+0.6%	109.28	18.6
Sainte-Anne-de-la-Rochelle	Municipality	RCM Le Val-Saint-François	625	598	+4.5%	61.86	10.1
Sainte-Anne-de-Sabrevois	Parish	RCM Le Haut-Richelieu	2,143	2,039	+5.1%	44.65	48.0
Sainte-Anne-des-Lacs	Parish	RCM Les Pays-d'en-Haut	3,862	3,611	+7.0%	24.65	156.7
Sainte-Anne-des-Monts	Town	RCM La Haute-Gaspésie	6,121	6,437	−4.9%	263.51	23.2
Sainte-Anne-de-Sorel	Municipality	RCM Pierre-De Saurel	2,731	2,771	−1.4%	36.41	75.0
Sainte-Anne-des-Plaines	Town	RCM Thérèse-De Blainville	15,221	14,421	+5.5%	93.44	162.9
Sainte-Anne-du-Lac	Municipality	RCM Antoine-Labelle	556	575	−3.3%	320.73	1.7
Sainte-Apolline-de-Patton	Parish	RCM Montmagny	505	542	−6.8%	256.51	2.0
Sainte-Aurélie	Municipality	RCM Les Etchemins	856	847	+1.1%	78.25	10.9
Sainte-Barbe	Municipality	RCM Le Haut-Saint-Laurent	1,609	1,324	+21.5%	40.14	40.1
Sainte-Béatrix	Municipality	RCM Matawinie	2,170	1,955	+11.0%	82.96	26.2
Sainte-Brigide-d'Iberville	Municipality	RCM Le Haut-Richelieu	1,428	1,402	+1.9%	70.52	20.2
Sainte-Brigitte-de-Laval	Town	RCM La Jacques-Cartier	8,468	7,348	+15.2%	108.42	78.1
Sainte-Brigitte-des-Saults	Parish	RCM Drummond	737	723	+1.9%	70.79	10.4
Sainte-Catherine	Town	RCM Roussillon	17,347	17,047	+1.8%	9.37	1,851.3
Sainte-Catherine-de-Hatley	Municipality	RCM Memphrémagog	2,741	2,479	+10.6%	86.34	31.7
Sainte-Catherine-de-la-Jacques-Cartier	Town	RCM La Jacques-Cartier	8,442	7,706	+9.6%	120.7	69.9
Sainte-Cécile-de-Lévrard	Parish	RCM Bécancour	349	372	−6.2%	32.32	10.8
Sainte-Cécile-de-Milton	Municipality	RCM La Haute-Yamaska	2,195	2,160	+1.6%	72.96	30.1
Sainte-Cécile-de-Whitton	Municipality	RCM Le Granit	853	863	−1.2%	146.46	5.8
Sainte-Christine	Parish	RCM Acton	772	730	+5.8%	92.12	8.4
Sainte-Christine-d'Auvergne	Municipality	RCM Portneuf	617	551	+12.0%	143.6	4.3
Sainte-Claire	Municipality	RCM Bellechasse	3,526	3,362	+4.9%	88.14	40.0
Sainte-Clotilde	Municipality	RCM Les Jardins-de-Napierville	2,646	1,622	+63.1%	78.21	33.8
Sainte-Clotilde-de-Beauce	Municipality	RCM Les Appalaches	569	549	+3.6%	60.55	9.4
Sainte-Clotilde-de-Horton	Municipality	RCM Arthabaska	1,563	1,569	−0.4%	114.66	13.6
Sainte-Croix	Municipality	RCM Lotbinière	2,529	2,516	+0.5%	69.63	36.3
Sainte-Edwidge-de-Clifton	Township	RCM Coaticook	546	504	+8.3%	101.84	5.4
Sainte-Élisabeth	Municipality	RCM D'Autray	1,390	1,459	−4.7%	83	16.7
Sainte-Élizabeth-de-Warwick	Municipality	RCM Arthabaska	383	372	+3.0%	51.87	7.4
Sainte-Émélie-de-l'Énergie	Municipality	RCM Matawinie	1,741	1,567	+11.1%	150.08	11.6
Sainte-Eulalie	Municipality	RCM Nicolet-Yamaska	984	894	+10.1%	86.3	11.4
Sainte-Euphémie-sur-Rivière-du-Sud	Municipality	RCM Montmagny	338	320	+5.6%	92.44	3.7
Sainte-Famille-de-l'Île-d'Orléans	Municipality	RCM L'Île-d'Orléans	850	938	−9.4%	50.54	16.8
Sainte-Félicité	Municipality	RCM La Matanie	1,100	1,087	+1.2%	90.73	12.1
Sainte-Félicité	Municipality	RCM L'Islet	350	389	−10.0%	94.89	3.7
Sainte-Flavie	Parish	RCM La Mitis	904	884	+2.3%	38.23	23.6
Sainte-Florence	Municipality	RCM La Matapédia	367	384	−4.4%	103.48	3.5
Sainte-Françoise	Municipality	RCM Bécancour	467	449	+4.0%	87.02	5.4
Sainte-Françoise	Parish	RCM Les Basques	383	386	−0.8%	88.83	4.3
Sainte-Geneviève-de-Batiscan	Parish	RCM Les Chenaux	1,028	1,006	+2.2%	97.65	10.5
Sainte-Geneviève-de-Berthier	Municipality	RCM D'Autray	2,253	2,280	−1.2%	67.03	33.6
Sainte-Germaine-Boulé	Municipality	RCM Abitibi-Ouest	941	986	−4.6%	110.04	8.6
Sainte-Gertrude-Manneville	Municipality	RCM Abitibi	793	787	+0.8%	316.46	2.5
Sainte-Hedwidge	Municipality	RCM Le Domaine-du-Roy	870	846	+2.8%	461.67	1.9
Sainte-Hélène-de-Bagot	Municipality	RCM Les Maskoutains	1,696	1,688	+0.5%	72.41	23.4
Sainte-Hélène-de-Chester	Municipality	RCM Arthabaska	384	374	+2.7%	83.72	4.6
Sainte-Hélène-de-Kamouraska	Municipality	RCM Kamouraska	891	918	−2.9%	60.46	14.7
Sainte-Hélène-de-Mancebourg	Parish	RCM Abitibi-Ouest	410	373	+9.9%	68.15	6.0
Sainte-Hénédine	Parish	RCM La Nouvelle-Beauce	1,440	1,271	+13.3%	51.53	27.9
Sainte-Irène	Parish	RCM La Matapédia	369	327	+12.8%	135.09	2.7
Sainte-Jeanne-d'Arc	Village	RCM Maria-Chapdelaine	1,101	1,050	+4.9%	267.28	4.1
Sainte-Jeanne-d'Arc-de-la-Mitis	Municipality	RCM La Mitis	217	280	−22.5%	110.34	2.0
Sainte-Julie	Town	RCM Marguerite-D'Youville	30,045	29,881	+0.5%	48.49	619.6
Sainte-Julienne	Municipality	RCM Montcalm	11,173	9,953	+12.3%	99.42	112.4
Sainte-Justine	Municipality	RCM Les Etchemins	1,828	1,820	+0.4%	126.28	14.5
Sainte-Justine-de-Newton	Municipality	RCM Vaudreuil-Soulanges	947	922	+2.7%	84.59	11.2
Sainte-Louise	Parish	RCM L'Islet	674	671	+0.4%	76.59	8.8
Sainte-Luce	Municipality	RCM La Mitis	2,845	2,801	+1.6%	72.59	39.2
Sainte-Lucie-de-Beauregard	Municipality	RCM Montmagny	275	280	−1.8%	82.17	3.3
Sainte-Lucie-des-Laurentides	Municipality	RCM Les Laurentides	1,445	1,256	+15.0%	108.98	13.3
Sainte-Madeleine	Village	RCM Les Maskoutains	2,268	2,233	+1.6%	5.36	423.1
Sainte-Madeleine-de-la-Rivière-Madeleine	Municipality	RCM La Haute-Gaspésie	289	289	0.0%	262.35	1.1
Sainte-Marcelline-de-Kildare	Municipality	RCM Matawinie	1,795	1,594	+12.6%	34.52	52.0
Sainte-Marguerite	Parish	RCM La Nouvelle-Beauce	1,175	1,078	+9.0%	83.05	14.1
Sainte-Marguerite-du-Lac-Masson	Town	RCM Les Pays-d'en-Haut	3,367	2,763	+21.9%	91.56	36.8
Sainte-Marguerite-Marie	Municipality	RCM La Matapédia	183	166	+10.2%	85.97	2.1
Sainte-Marie	Town	RCM La Nouvelle-Beauce	13,134	13,565	−3.2%	107.55	122.1
Sainte-Marie-de-Blandford	Municipality	RCM Bécancour	443	468	−5.3%	69.3	6.4
Sainte-Marie-Madeleine	Parish	RCM Les Maskoutains	2,876	2,892	−0.6%	50.04	57.5
Sainte-Marie-Salomé	Municipality	RCM Montcalm	1,221	1,209	+1.0%	33.79	36.1
Sainte-Marthe	Municipality	RCM Vaudreuil-Soulanges	1,014	1,097	−7.6%	79.6	12.7
Sainte-Marthe-sur-le-Lac	Town	RCM Deux-Montagnes	19,797	18,074	+9.5%	8.73	2,267.7
Sainte-Martine	Municipality	RCM Beauharnois-Salaberry	5,664	5,461	+3.7%	63.06	89.8
Sainte-Mélanie	Municipality	RCM Joliette	3,250	2,989	+8.7%	76.1	42.7
Sainte-Monique	Municipality	RCM Lac-Saint-Jean-Est	858	846	+1.4%	152.53	5.6
Sainte-Monique	Municipality	RCM Nicolet-Yamaska	519	501	+3.6%	58.10	8.9
Sainte-Paule	Municipality	RCM La Matanie	247	233	+6.0%	83.36	3.0
Sainte-Perpétue	Municipality	RCM L'Islet	1,715	1,639	+4.6%	291.04	5.9
Sainte-Perpétue	Parish	RCM Nicolet-Yamaska	916	959	−4.5%	71.51	12.8
Sainte-Pétronille	Village	RCM L'Île-d'Orléans	1,055	1,033	+2.1%	4.32	244.2
Sainte-Praxède	Parish	RCM Les Appalaches	351	327	+7.3%	136.18	2.6
Sainte-Rita	Municipality	RCM Les Basques	303	307	−1.3%	129.52	2.3
Sainte-Rose-de-Watford	Municipality	RCM Les Etchemins	740	729	+1.5%	115.13	6.4
Sainte-Rose-du-Nord	Parish	RCM Le Fjord-du-Saguenay	434	439	−1.1%	116.61	3.7
Sainte-Sabine	Municipality	RCM Brome-Missisquoi	1,105	1,085	+1.8%	55.33	20.0
Sainte-Sabine	Parish	RCM Les Etchemins	343	358	−4.2%	66.89	5.1
Sainte-Séraphine	Parish	RCM Arthabaska	441	355	+24.2%	75.86	5.8
Sainte-Sophie	Municipality	RCM La Rivière-du-Nord	18,080	15,690	+15.2%	111.2	162.6
Sainte-Sophie-de-Lévrard	Parish	RCM Bécancour	704	729	−3.4%	84.05	8.4
Sainte-Sophie-d'Halifax	Municipality	RCM L'Érable	595	612	−2.8%	92.13	6.5
Sainte-Thècle	Municipality	RCM Mékinac	2,415	2,484	−2.8%	212.48	11.4
Sainte-Thérèse	Town	RCM Thérèse-De Blainville	26,533	25,989	+2.1%	9.48	2,798.8
Sainte-Thérèse-de-Gaspé	Municipality	RCM Le Rocher-Percé	979	1,015	−3.5%	34.45	28.4
Sainte-Thérèse-de-la-Gatineau	Municipality	RCM La Vallée-de-la-Gatineau	588	520	+13.1%	60.68	9.7
Sainte-Ursule	Municipality	RCM Maskinongé	1,355	1,330	+1.9%	67.83	20.0
Sainte-Victoire-de-Sorel	Municipality	RCM Pierre-De Saurel	2,457	2,461	−0.2%	75.26	32.6
Saints-Anges	Municipality	RCM La Nouvelle-Beauce	1,239	1,157	+7.1%	68.65	18.0
Saints-Martyrs-Canadiens	Parish	RCM Arthabaska	277	254	+9.1%	111.4	2.5
Salaberry-de-Valleyfield	Town	RCM Beauharnois-Salaberry	42,787	40,745	+5.0%	108.56	394.1
Salluit	Northern village	Kativik TE	1,580	1,483	+6.5%	15.08	104.8
Sayabec	Municipality	RCM La Matapédia	1,706	1,831	−6.8%	130.31	13.1
Schefferville	Town	RCM Caniapiscau	244	130	+87.7%	24.76	9.9
Scotstown	Town	RCM Le Haut-Saint-François	459	472	−2.8%	11.44	40.1
Scott	Municipality	RCM La Nouvelle-Beauce	2,566	2,352	+9.1%	31.29	82.0
Senneterre	Parish	RCM La Vallée-de-l'Or	1,202	1,192	+0.8%	567.05	2.1
Senneterre	Town	RCM La Vallée-de-l'Or	2,782	2,868	−3.0%	14,718.51	0.2
Senneville	Village	Urban agglomeration of Montreal	951	921	+3.3%	7.45	127.7
Sept-Îles	Town	RCM Sept-Rivières	24,569	25,400	−3.3%	1,742.88	14.1
Shannon	Town	RCM La Jacques-Cartier	6,432	6,031	+6.6%	63.54	101.2
Shawinigan	Town	Equivalent territory	49,620	49,349	+0.5%	729.98	68.0
Shawville	Municipality	RCM Pontiac	1,668	1,587	+5.1%	5.38	310.0
Sheenboro	Municipality	RCM Pontiac	149	130	+14.6%	565.43	0.3
Shefford	Township	RCM La Haute-Yamaska	7,253	6,947	+4.4%	117.99	61.5
Sherbrooke	Town	Equivalent territory	172,950	161,323	+7.2%	353.4	489.4
Shigawake	Municipality	RCM Bonaventure	333	292	+14.0%	76.82	4.3
Sorel-Tracy	Town	RCM Pierre-De Saurel	35,165	34,755	+1.2%	57.28	613.9
Stanbridge East	Municipality	RCM Brome-Missisquoi	834	866	−3.7%	49.41	16.9
Stanbridge Station	Municipality	RCM Brome-Missisquoi	291	274	+6.2%	18.07	16.1
Stanstead	Township	RCM Memphrémagog	1,148	1,036	+10.8%	113.2	10.1
Stanstead	Town	RCM Memphrémagog	2,824	2,788	+1.3%	21.95	128.7
Stanstead-Est	Municipality	RCM Coaticook	642	584	+9.9%	114.54	5.6
Stoke	Municipality	RCM Le Val-Saint-François	3,014	2,955	+2.0%	255.12	11.8
Stoneham-et-Tewkesbury	United township	RCM La Jacques-Cartier	9,682	8,359	+15.8%	670.03	14.5
Stornoway	Municipality	RCM Le Granit	535	530	+0.9%	180.15	3.0
Stratford	Township	RCM Le Granit	1,036	945	+9.6%	119.86	8.6
Stukely-Sud	Village	RCM Memphrémagog	1,142	1,058	+7.9%	63.19	18.1
Sutton	Town	RCM Brome-Missisquoi	4,548	4,012	+13.4%	245.69	18.5
Tadoussac	Village	RCM La Haute-Côte-Nord	814	799	+1.9%	52.73	15.4
Taschereau	Municipality	RCM Abitibi-Ouest	898	963	−6.7%	246.97	3.6
Tasiujaq	Northern village	Kativik TE	420	369	+13.8%	65.53	6.4
Témiscaming	Town	RCM Témiscamingue	2,368	2,431	−2.6%	710.84	3.3
Témiscouata-sur-le-Lac	Town	RCM Témiscouata	5,054	4,910	+2.9%	218.81	23.1
Terrasse-Vaudreuil	Municipality	RCM Vaudreuil-Soulanges	1,887	1,986	−5.0%	1.06	1,780.2
Terrebonne	Town	RCM Les Moulins	119,944	111,575	+7.5%	153.76	780.1
Thetford Mines	Town	RCM Les Appalaches	26,072	25,403	+2.6%	225.97	115.4
Thorne	Municipality	RCM Pontiac	528	448	+17.9%	173.09	3.1
Thurso	Town	RCM Papineau	3,084	2,818	+9.4%	6.65	463.8
Tingwick	Municipality	RCM Arthabaska	1,484	1,410	+5.2%	169.48	8.8
Tourville	Municipality	RCM L'Islet	576	589	−2.2%	164.36	3.5
Trécesson	Township	RCM Abitibi	1,232	1,223	+0.7%	196.89	6.3
Très-Saint-Rédempteur	Municipality	RCM Vaudreuil-Soulanges	978	898	+8.9%	26.06	37.5
Très-Saint-Sacrement	Municipality	RCM Le Haut-Saint-Laurent	1,189	1,186	+0.3%	97.16	12.2
Tring-Jonction	Village	RCM Beauce-Centre	1,526	1,448	+5.4%	27.32	55.9
Trois-Pistoles	Town	RCM Les Basques	3,115	3,246	−4.0%	7.63	408.3
Trois-Rives	Municipality	RCM Mékinac	512	396	+29.3%	597.76	0.9
Trois-Rivières	Town	Equivalent territory	139,163	134,413	+3.5%	288.65	482.1
Ulverton	Municipality	RCM Le Val-Saint-François	433	418	+3.6%	51.27	8.4
Umiujaq	Northern village	Kativik TE	541	442	+22.4%	28.38	19.1
Upton	Municipality	RCM Acton	2,046	2,092	−2.2%	54.77	37.4
Val-Alain	Municipality	RCM Lotbinière	986	924	+6.7%	102.54	9.6
Val-Brillant	Municipality	RCM La Matapédia	899	927	−3.0%	77.9	11.5
Val-d'Or	Town	RCM La Vallée-de-l'Or	32,752	32,491	+0.8%	3,536.84	9.3
Val-David	Village	RCM Les Laurentides	5,558	4,917	+13.0%	42.66	130.3
Val-des-Bois	Municipality	RCM Papineau	920	865	+6.4%	222.67	4.1
Val-des-Lacs	Municipality	RCM Les Laurentides	750	744	+0.8%	126.7	5.9
Val-des-Monts	Municipality	RCM Les Collines-de-l'Outaouais	13,328	11,582	+15.1%	434.77	30.7
Val-des-Sources	Town	RCM Les Sources	7,088	6,786	+4.5%	30.25	234.3
Val-Joli	Municipality	RCM Le Val-Saint-François	1,671	1,619	+3.2%	91.69	18.2
Val-Morin	Municipality	RCM Les Laurentides	3,123	2,870	+8.8%	39.20	79.7
Val-Racine	Municipality	RCM Le Granit	183	178	+2.8%	116.06	1.6
Val-Saint-Gilles	Municipality	RCM Abitibi-Ouest	169	157	+7.6%	109.39	1.5
Valcourt	Township	RCM Le Val-Saint-François	1,029	1,044	−1.4%	80.39	12.8
Valcourt	Town	RCM Le Val-Saint-François	2,139	2,165	−1.2%	5.41	395.4
Vallée-Jonction	Municipality	RCM La Nouvelle-Beauce	1,864	1,875	−0.6%	25.45	73.2
Varennes	Town	RCM Marguerite-D'Youville	21,198	21,257	−0.3%	94.8	223.6
Vaudreuil-Dorion	Town	RCM Vaudreuil-Soulanges	43,268	38,117	+13.5%	72.65	595.6
Vaudreuil-sur-le-Lac	Village	RCM Vaudreuil-Soulanges	1,361	1,341	+1.5%	1.38	986.2
Venise-en-Québec	Municipality	RCM Le Haut-Richelieu	1,899	1,634	+16.2%	13.13	144.6
Verchères	Municipality	RCM Marguerite-D'Youville	5,759	5,835	−1.3%	72.63	79.3
Victoriaville	Town	RCM Arthabaska	47,760	46,130	+3.5%	84.33	566.3
Ville-Marie	Town	RCM Témiscamingue	2,464	2,584	−4.6%	5.83	422.6
Villeroy	Municipality	RCM L'Érable	488	457	+6.8%	101.9	4.8
Waltham	Municipality	RCM Pontiac	387	378	+2.4%	360.19	1.1
Warden	Village	RCM La Haute-Yamaska	362	363	−0.3%	5.46	66.3
Warwick	Town	RCM Arthabaska	4,729	4,635	+2.0%	109.6	43.1
Waskaganish	Cree village	Eeyou Istchee TE	0	0	NA	274.22	0.0
Waswanipi	Cree village	Eeyou Istchee TE	0	0	NA	213.35	0.0
Waterloo	Town	RCM La Haute-Yamaska	4,920	4,410	+11.6%	12.23	402.3
Waterville	Town	RCM Coaticook	2,307	2,121	+8.8%	44.03	52.4
Weedon	Municipality	RCM Le Haut-Saint-François	2,667	2,670	−0.1%	215.95	12.4
Wemindji	Cree village	Eeyou Istchee TE	0	0	NA	169.12	0.0
Wentworth	Township	RCM Argenteuil	682	533	+28.0%	85.03	8.0
Wentworth-Nord	Municipality	RCM Les Pays-d'en-Haut	1,672	1,361	+22.9%	152.87	10.9
Westbury	Township	RCM Le Haut-Saint-François	1,097	1,006	+9.0%	55.61	19.7
Westmount	Town	Urban agglomeration of Montreal	19,658	20,312	−3.2%	4.04	4,865.8
Whapmagoostui	Cree village	Eeyou Istchee TE	0	0	NA	120.86	0.0
Wickham	Municipality	RCM Drummond	2,587	2,541	+1.8%	98.63	26.2
Windsor	Town	RCM Le Val-Saint-François	5,294	5,419	−2.3%	14.53	364.3
Wotton	Municipality	RCM Les Sources	1,402	1,430	−2.0%	143.15	9.8
Yamachiche	Municipality	RCM Maskinongé	2,813	2,830	−0.6%	106.39	26.4
Yamaska	Municipality	RCM Pierre-De Saurel	1,736	1,687	+2.9%	72.82	23.8
Sub-total towns	—	—	7,169,324	6,887,500	+4.1%	82,573.59	86.8
Sub-total village municipalities	—	—	44,120	42,223	+4.5%	2,089.58	21.1
Sub-total parish municipalities	—	—	131,772	128,413	+2.6%	14,338.12	9.2
Sub-total township municipalities	—	—	47,954	43,769	+9.6%	5,851.45	8.2
Sub-total united township municipalities	—	—	10,002	8,654	+15.6%	940.14	10.6
Sub-total municipalities	—	—	1,042,249	993,812	+4.9%	389,434.41	2.7
Sub-total Cree village municipalities	—	—	10	0	NA	2,111.48	0.0
Sub-total Naskapi village municipalities	—	—	0	0	NA	234.80	0.0
Sub-total northern village municipalities	—	—	14,045	12,502	+12.3%	811.50	17.3
Total local municipalities	—	—	8,459,476	8,118,266	+4.2%	498,385.07	17.0
Province of Quebec	—	—	8,501,833	8,164,361	+4.1%	1,298,599.75	6.5

== See also ==
- Administrative divisions of Quebec
- Classification of municipalities in Quebec
- List of census agglomerations in Quebec
- List of communities in Quebec
- List of designated places in Quebec
- List of former municipalities in Quebec
- List of population centres in Quebec
- 21st-century municipal history of Quebec
