= Warden, Quebec =

Warden
- Village municipality
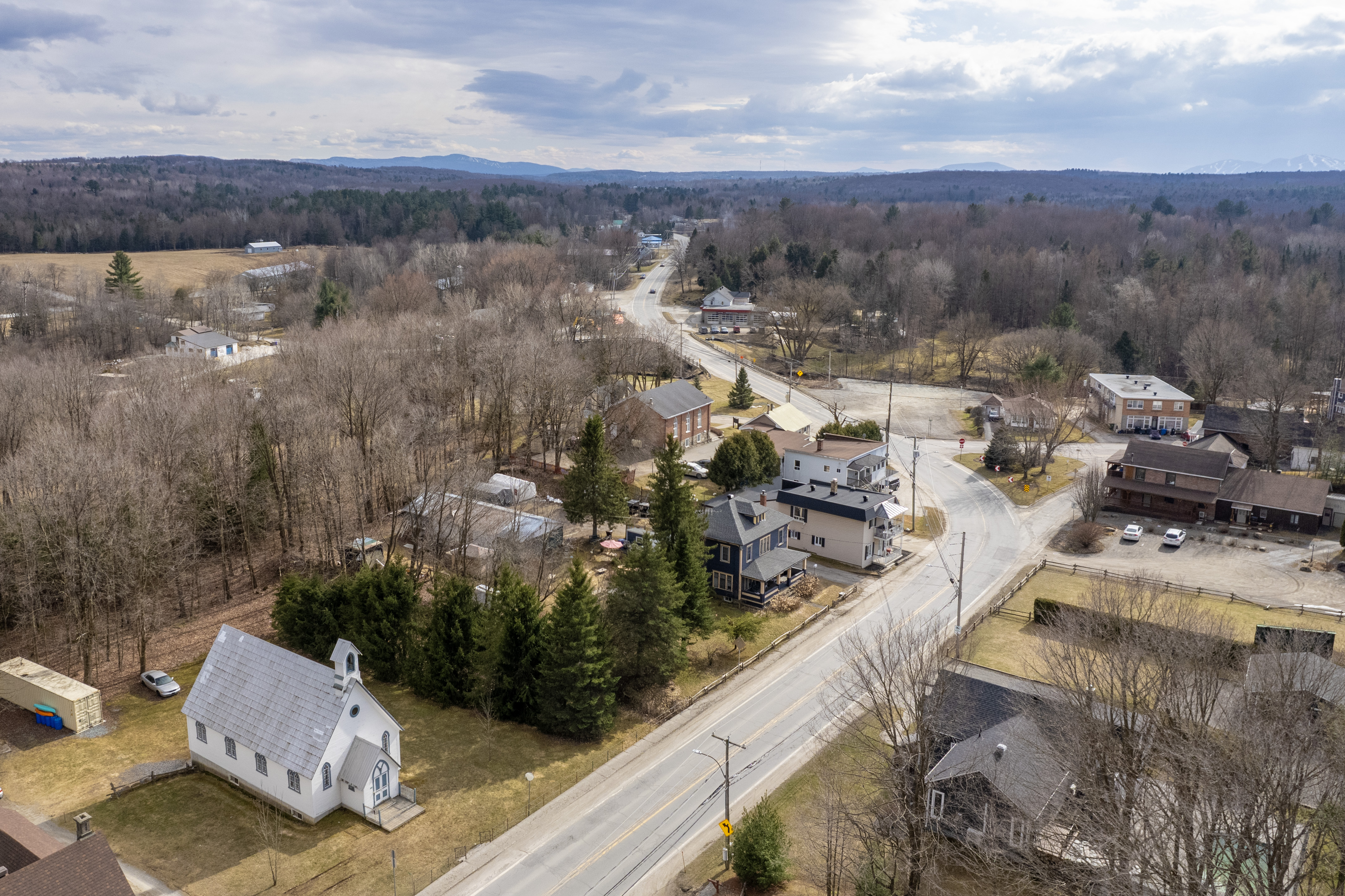
- Aerial view of Warden

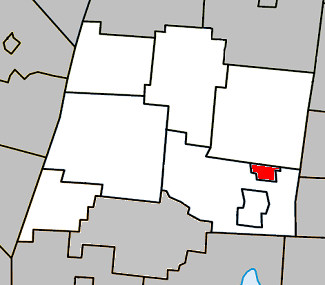
- Location within La Haute-Yamaska RCM.

- Location in southern Quebec.
- Coordinates: 45°23′N 72°30′W
- Country: Canada
- Province: Quebec
- Region: Estrie
- RCM: La Haute-Yamaska
- Constituted: March 31, 1916

Government
  - Mayor: Philip Tétrault
  - Federal riding: Shefford
  - Prov. riding: Daniel-Johnson

Area
  - Total: 5.60 km^{2} (2.16 sq mi)
  - Land: 5.53 km^{2} (2.14 sq mi)

Population (2011)
  - Total: 358
  - Density: 64.7/km^{2} (168/sq mi)
  - Pop 2006-2011: ▲3.5%
  - Dwellings: 149
- Time zone: UTC−5 (EST)
  - Summer (DST): UTC−4 (EDT)
- Postal code(s): J0E 2M0
- Area codes: 450 and 579
- Highways: R-241; R-243

Warden is a village located in the province of Quebec, part of La Haute-Yamaska Regional County Municipality in the administrative area of Estrie. The population as of the Canada 2011 Census was 358. The village is almost completely encircled by the municipality of Shefford with Saint-Joachim-de-Shefford, as its only other border, to the north.

== Demographics ==
In the 2021 Census of Population conducted by Statistics Canada, Warden had a population of 362 living in 155 of its 163 total private dwellings, a change of −0.3% from its 2016 population of 363. With a land area of 5.46 km^{2} (2.11 sq mi), it had a population density of 66.3/km^{2} (171.7/sq mi) in 2021.

Population trend:

Census	Population	Change (%)
2011	358	▲3.5%
2006	346	▲3.9%
2001	333	▲0.9%
1996	330	▼2.9%
1991	340	N/A

Mother tongue language (2006)

Language	Population	Pct (%)
French only	265	73.61%
English only	70	19.44%
Both English and French	15	4.17%
Other languages	10	2.78%

== See also ==
- List of anglophone communities in Quebec
- List of village municipalities in Quebec
