= Shefford, Quebec =

Shefford
- Township municipality
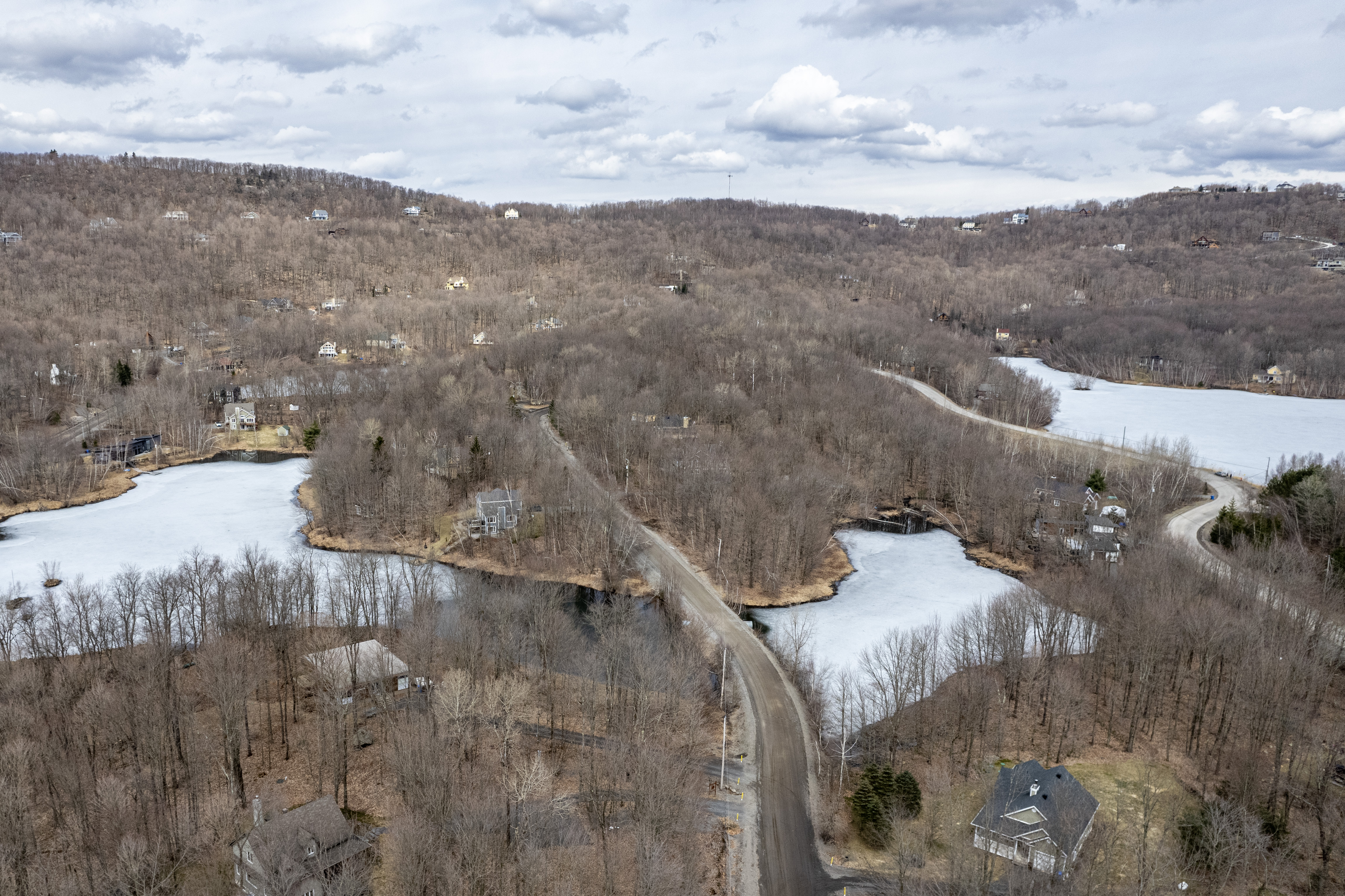
- Lake on Mount Shefford

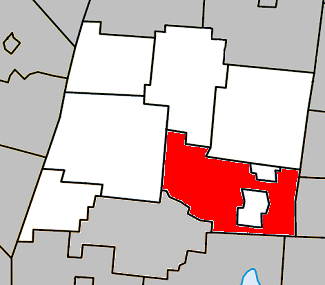
- Location within La Haute-Yamaska RCM

- Location in southern Quebec
- Coordinates: 45°21′N 72°34′W
- Country: Canada
- Province: Quebec
- Region: Estrie
- RCM: La Haute-Yamaska
- Constituted: July 1, 1855
- Named for: Shefford, Bedfordshire

Government
  - Mayor: Éric Chagnon
  - Federal riding: Shefford
  - Prov. riding: Daniel-Johnson

Area
  - Total: 119.30 km^{2} (46.06 sq mi)
  - Land: 117.99 km^{2} (45.56 sq mi)

Population (2021)
  - Total: 7,253
  - Density: 61.5/km^{2} (159/sq mi)
  - Pop 2016-2021: ▲4.4%
  - Dwellings: 3,095
- Time zone: UTC−5 (EST)
  - Summer (DST): UTC−4 (EDT)
- Postal code(s): J2M
- Area codes: 450 and 579
- Highways A-10: R-112; R-241; R-243
- Website: www.cantonshefford.qc.ca

Shefford (French pronunciation: [ʃɛfɚd, -fœʁd]) is a township municipality located in the province of Quebec. It is part of the Haute-Yamaska Regional County Municipality in the administrative area of Estrie. The population as of the Canada 2021 Census was 7,253. The township completely encircles the city of Waterloo and the city of Warden.

== Demographics ==
In the 2021 Census of Population conducted by Statistics Canada, Shefford had a population of 7,253 living in 2,909 of its 3,095 total private dwellings, a change of 4.4% from its 2016 population of 6,947. With a land area of 117.99 km^{2} (45.56 sq mi), it had a population density of 61.5/km^{2} (159.2/sq mi) in 2021.

Population trend:

Census	Population	Change (%)
2021	7,253	▲4.4%
2016	6,947	▲3.5%
2011	6,711	▲13.0%
2006	5,941	▲15.7%
2001	5,133	▲14.2%
1996	4,496	▲22.6%
1991	3,667	N/A

Mother tongue language (2006)

Language	Population	Pct (%)
French only	5,345	90.13%
English only	450	7.59%
Both English and French	55	0.93%
Other languages	80	1.35%

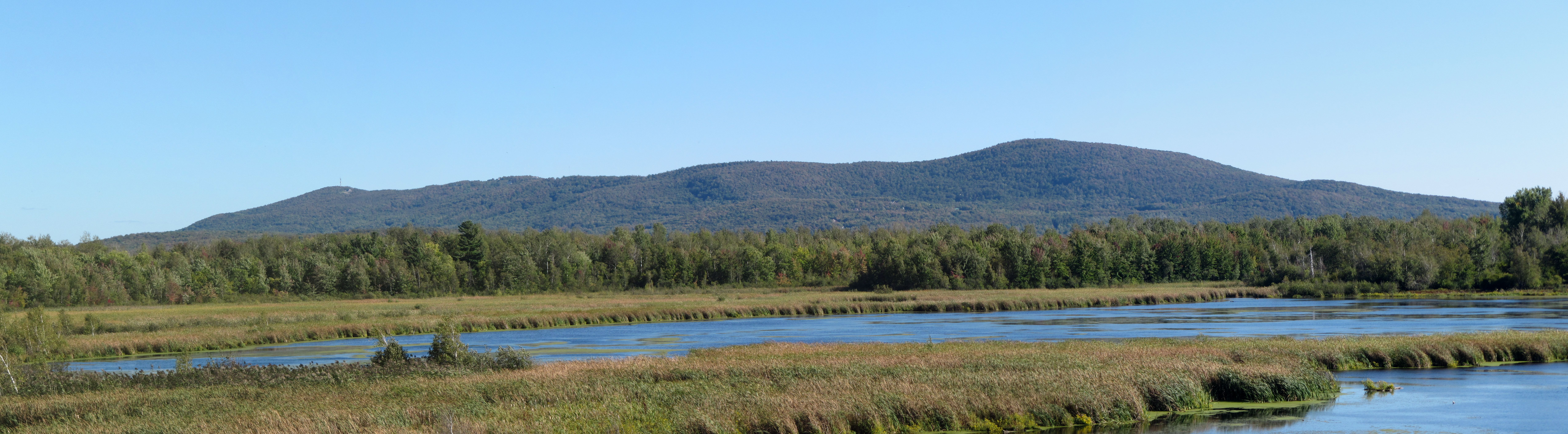
Mont Shefford

Mont Shefford

== See also ==
- List of township municipalities in Quebec
