= Regional conference of elected officers =

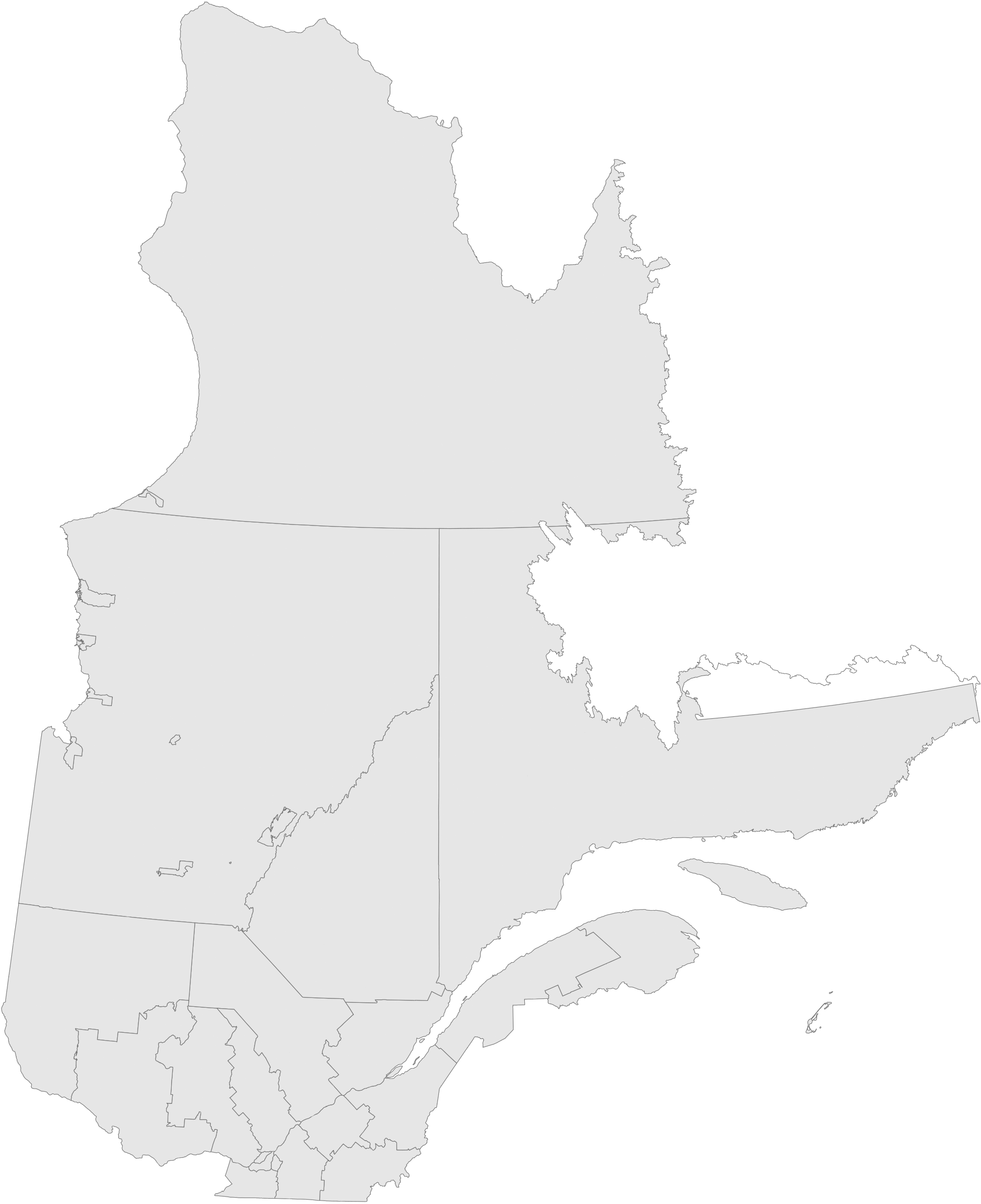
CRE du Quebec

A regional conference of representatives (French: Conférence régionale des élus (CRE)) was a type of governance in an administrative region of Quebec.

The CREs were primarily responsible for advising the Government of Quebec on issues in their respective regions and implementing projects assigned to them by the government. As such, they were acting as both interlocutors as well as agents.

They had no taxation or management powers in their respective regions. They worked with various political and socioeconomic partners, including the regional departments and agencies in Quebec, the regional county councils municipalities, the local development centres and development corporations that operated in the region.

Originally Quebec was divided into 19 CREs, with complete territorial coverage: one for each of the administrative regions, except for Montérégie which had three. Today there are more than 21 organisations, if first nations are included.

CREs were abolished in 2016.

== List of CREs ==
1. CRE – Bas-Saint-Laurent (01) - Rimouski : Regional conference of representatives of Bas-Saint-Laurent
  1. (French: Table régionale des élus municipaux du Bas-Saint-Laurent)
2. CRE – Saguenay–Lac-Saint-Jean (02) - Jonquière : Regional conference of representatives of Saguenay-Lac-Saint-Jean
  1. (French: Table régionale des élus (TRÉ) du Saguenay-Lac-Saint-Jean)
3. CRE – Capitale-Nationale (03) - Québec : Regional conference of representatives of Capitale-Nationale (French: Forum des élus de la région de la Capitale-Nationale)
4. CRE – Mauricie (04) - Trois-Rivières : Regional conference of representatives of Mauricie
  1. (French: Table des élus de la Mauricie)
  2. Conseil de la Nation Atikamekw
5. CRE – Estrie (05) - Sherbrooke : Regional conference of representatives of Estrie
  1. (French: Table des MRC de l'Estrie)
6. CRE – Montreal (06) - Urban agglomeration of Montreal : Regional conference of representatives of Montreal
  1. (French: Concertation Montréal / Agglomération de Montréal)
7. CRE – Outaouais (07) - Gatineau : Regional conference of representatives of Outaouais
  1. (French: Conférence des Préfets de l’Outaouais (CPO))
8. CRE – Abitibi-Témiscamingue (08) - Rouyn-Noranda : Regional conference of elected officers of Abitibi-Témiscamingue
  1. (French: Table régionale de l'Abitibi-Témiscamingue)
  2. Algonquin Nation Programs and Services Secretariat
9. CRE – Côte-Nord (09) - Baie-Comeau : Regional conference of representatives of Côte-Nord
  1. (French: Assemblée des MRC de la Côte-Nord)
10. Nord-du-Québec (10)
  1. CRE – Baie-James Eeyou Istchee James Bay Territory (French: Eeyou Istchee Baie-James (gouvernement régional)) (Matagami)
  2. Grand Council of the Crees Gouvernement de la nation crie (Nemaska)
  3. Kativik Regional Government Administration régionale Kativik (Kuujjuaq)
11. CRE – Gaspésie-Îles-de-la-Madeleine (11) - Gaspé : Regional conference of representatives of Gaspésie-Îles-de-la-Madeleine
  1. (French: Regroupement des MRC de la Gaspésie – Forum Gaspésie–Îles-de-la-Madeleine)
  2. Mi'gmawei Mawiomi Secretariat
12. CRE – Chaudière-Appalaches (12) - Montmagny : Regional conference of representatives of Chaudière-Appalaches
  1. (French: Table régionale des élus municipaux de la Chaudière-Appalaches)
13. CRE – Laval (13) - Laval : Regional conference of representatives of Laval (French: Laval)
14. CRE – Lanaudière (14) - Joliette : Regional conference of representatives of Lanaudière
  1. (French: Table des préfets de Lanaudière)
15. CRE – Laurentides (15) - Saint-Jérôme : Regional conference of representatives of Laurentides
  1. (French: Conseil des préfets et des élus de la région des Laurentides)
16. Montérégie (16)
  1. CRE – Agglomération de Longueuil: Regional conference of representatives of the urban agglomeration of Longueuil (French: Agglomération de Longueuil) (Longueuil)
  2. CRE – Montérégie Est Regional conference of representatives of Montérégie Est (French: Table de concertation des préfets de la Montérégie) (McMasterville)
    - includes Brome-Missisquoi, La Haute-Yamaska, Acton, Pierre-De Saurel, Les Maskoutains, Rouville, Le Haut-Richelieu, La Vallée-du-Richelieu, Marguerite-D'Youville regional county municipalities
  3. CRE – Vallée-du-Haut-Saint-Laurent Regional conference of representatives of Vallée-du-Haut-Saint-Laurent (French: Table des préfets et élus de la Couronne-Sud) (Salaberry-de-Valleyfield)
    - includes Roussillon, Les Jardins-de-Napierville, Le Haut-Saint-Laurent, Beauharnois-Salaberry, Vaudreuil-Soulanges regional county municipalities
17. CRE – Centre-du-Québec (17) - Drummondville : Regional conference of representatives of Centre-du-Québec
  1. (French: Table des MRC du Centre-du-Québec)

== See also ==
- Regions of Quebec
