= Carmen Juneau =

Canadian politician (1934–1999)

MNA for Johnson
- In office 1981–1994
- Preceded by: Camille Picard
- Succeeded by: Claude Boucher

Mayor of Windsor, Quebec
- In office 1995–1999

Personal details
- Born: Carmen Cloutier; August 25, 1934 Saint-Grégoire-de-Greenlay, Quebec
- Died: June 18, 1999 (aged 64) Windsor, Quebec
- Party: Parti Québécois
- Spouse: Armand Juneau
- Profession: lawyer

Carmen Juneau (August 25, 1934 – June 18, 1999) was a Canadian politician, who served in the National Assembly of Quebec from 1981 to 1994 and as mayor of Windsor, Quebec from 1995 until her death in 1999. In provincial politics, she represented the electoral district of Johnson as a member of the Parti Québécois.

Following Juneau's death, a municipal park in Windsor was named in her honour in 2002.
