= Waterloo, Quebec =

City in Quebec, Canada

Waterloo
- City
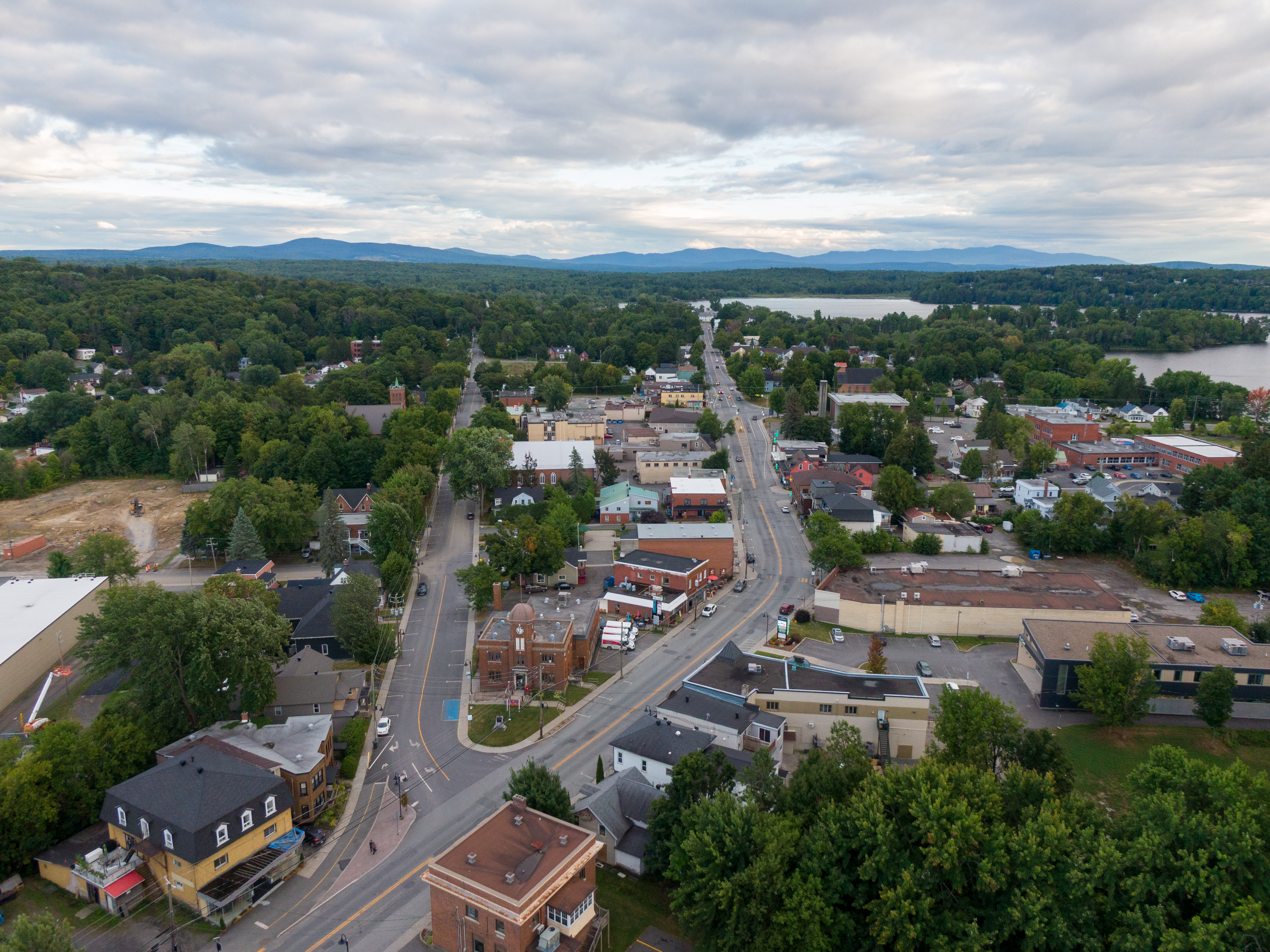
- Waterloo in 2025

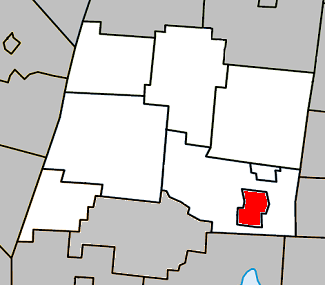
- Location within La Haute-Yamaska RCM

- Location in southern Quebec
- Coordinates: 45°20′41″N 72°30′55″W
- Country: Canada
- Province: Quebec
- Region: Estrie
- RCM: La Haute-Yamaska
- Constituted: January 1, 1867
- City status: 1890

Government
  - Mayor: Pascal Russell
  - Federal riding: Shefford
  - Provincial riding: Daniel-Johnson

Area
  - Land: 12.23 km^{2} (4.72 sq mi)

Population (2021)
  - Total: 4,920
  - Density: 402.2/km^{2} (1,042/sq mi)
  - Pop. 2016–2021: ▲11.6%
  - Dwellings: 2,404
- Time zone: UTC−5 (EST)
  - Summer (DST): UTC−4 (EDT)
- Postal code: J0E
- Area codes: 450, 579 and 354
- Highways: A-10; R-112; R-241; R-243
- Website: www.ville.waterloo.qc.ca

Waterloo is a city in the La Haute-Yamaska Regional County Municipality in Estrie, Quebec, Canada. Its territory is completely surrounded by the township municipality of Shefford. The North Yamaska River crosses the city, which developed beside Lac Waterloo. Waterloo had a population of 4,920 in the 2021 Canadian census, an increase of 11.6 per cent from 2016.

Settlement at the site began in the 1790s. The village grew around mills on the North Yamaska and later became the administrative centre of the former Shefford County. The arrival of the Stanstead, Shefford and Chambly Railroad in 1861 brought a period of rapid construction and industrial growth; Waterloo was constituted as a village municipality in 1867 and received city status in 1890.

== Toponymy ==
The early settlement was known as Lewis' Falls. Ezekiel Lewis built a sawmill on the North Yamaska at the site in 1793.

Waterloo's municipal heritage trail dates the adoption of the name Waterloo to 1822 and attributes it to Hezekiah Robinson. The Dictionary of Canadian Biography records that Robinson moved to Lower Canada in May 1821 and purchased a mill property in Shefford Township in October of that year.

The name commemorates Napoleon's defeat at the Battle of Waterloo in 1815. A post office using the name Waterloo opened in 1836. The name was later used by the Catholic parish of Saint-Bernardin-de-Waterloo, canonically erected in 1865, and by the village municipality created in 1867.

== History ==
=== Early settlement ===
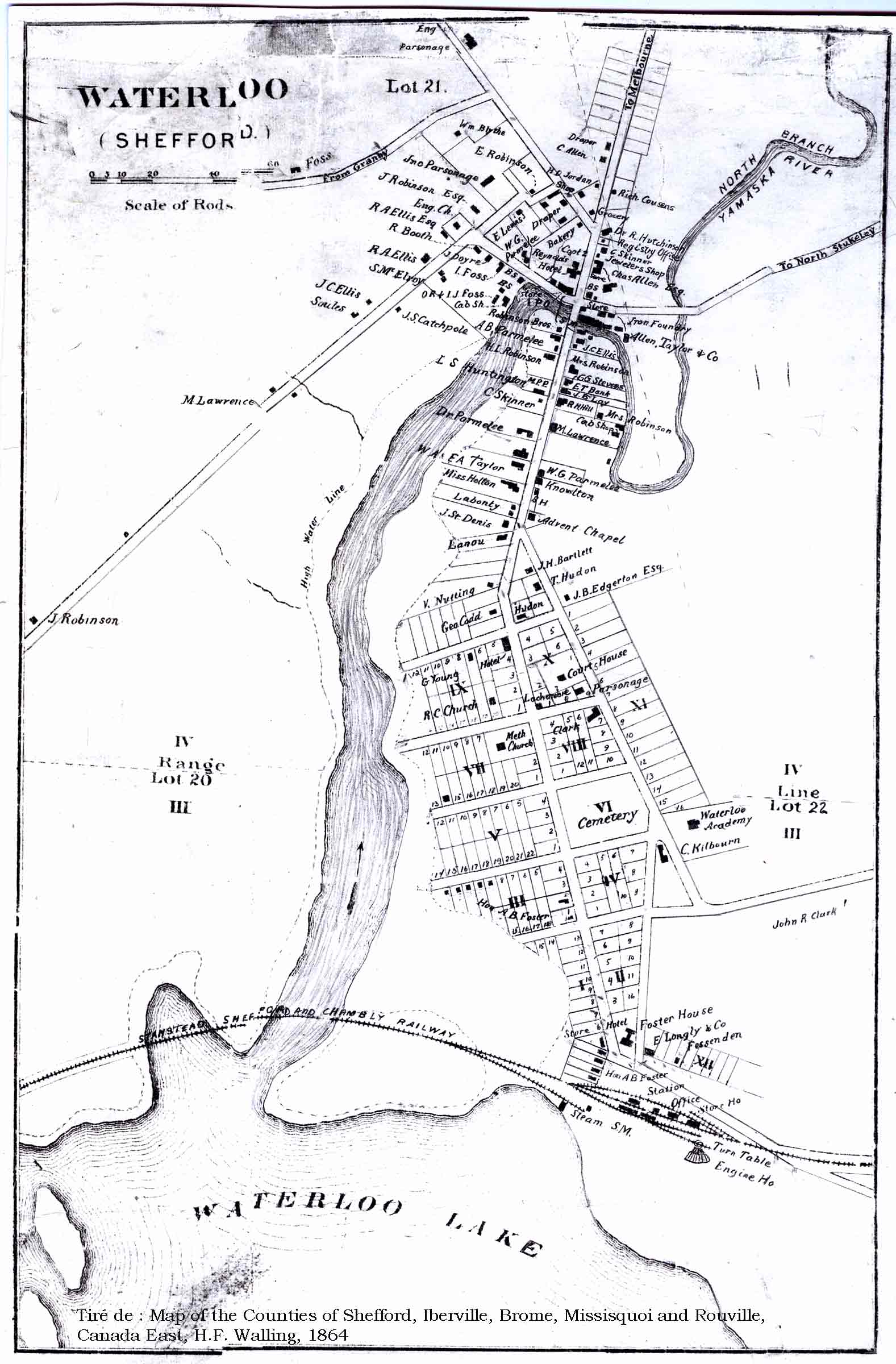
Waterloo in 1864

Sources place the beginning of permanent settlement in the Waterloo area in the 1790s. The Société d'histoire de la Haute-Yamaska gives 1793 as the first permanent occupation and Waterloo's heritage trail dates Ezekiel Lewis's first sawmill to that year. A later study by the historical society dates the first dams and mills built by Lewis at Waterloo and John Mock at Warden to 1795, while the Commission de toponymie dates the arrival of American Loyalist settlers on this branch of the Yamaska to 1796.

Hezekiah Robinson became one of the settlement's principal landowners and merchants in the early 1820s. The property he purchased included a house, a gristmill and a sawmill. He added a carding mill and repaired the other mills, which were operating by June 1823. Robinson later sold building lots as Waterloo developed. In 1836 he was appointed the first postmaster of Shefford County. He also gave 17 acres of land to the Church of England; Waterloo's first Anglican church was built there in 1843.

Waterloo became the county seat of Shefford County during the 19th century and for many years was its judicial centre. The county registry office moved from Frost Village to Waterloo in 1856.

The Catholic parish of Saint-Bernardin-de-Waterloo was canonically erected in 1865. French-Canadian settlement increased in the early 1860s in a community that had previously been anglophone and Protestant.

=== Railways and municipal growth ===
Waterloo's growth accelerated after the railway arrived. The Stanstead, Shefford and Chambly Railroad Company, incorporated in 1853, built a 42.4 mi (68.2 km) railway from St. Johns to Waterloo between 1859 and 1861.

Railway contractor Asa Belknap Foster had settled in Waterloo in 1852. During the railway-development period he acquired land in the southern part of Waterloo, promoted the construction of railway facilities there, laid out what became Foster Street and developed nearby hotel and residential properties.

The population rose from about 400 in 1861 to 2,500 by 1875. By the end of the 1870s Waterloo had several churches, a courthouse, a public market, a branch of the Eastern Townships Bank, hotels and a number of factories and workshops.

The village municipality of Waterloo was constituted on 1 January 1867. Foster became its first mayor.

In April 1869, rapid snowmelt caused Lac Waterloo to overflow. Six inches (15 cm) of water entered the offices of the Waterloo Advertiser, Foster Street was flooded and several families left their homes. The water receded after two days. Downstream, eight of the ten dams then standing between Waterloo and Granby were destroyed, along with several bridges.

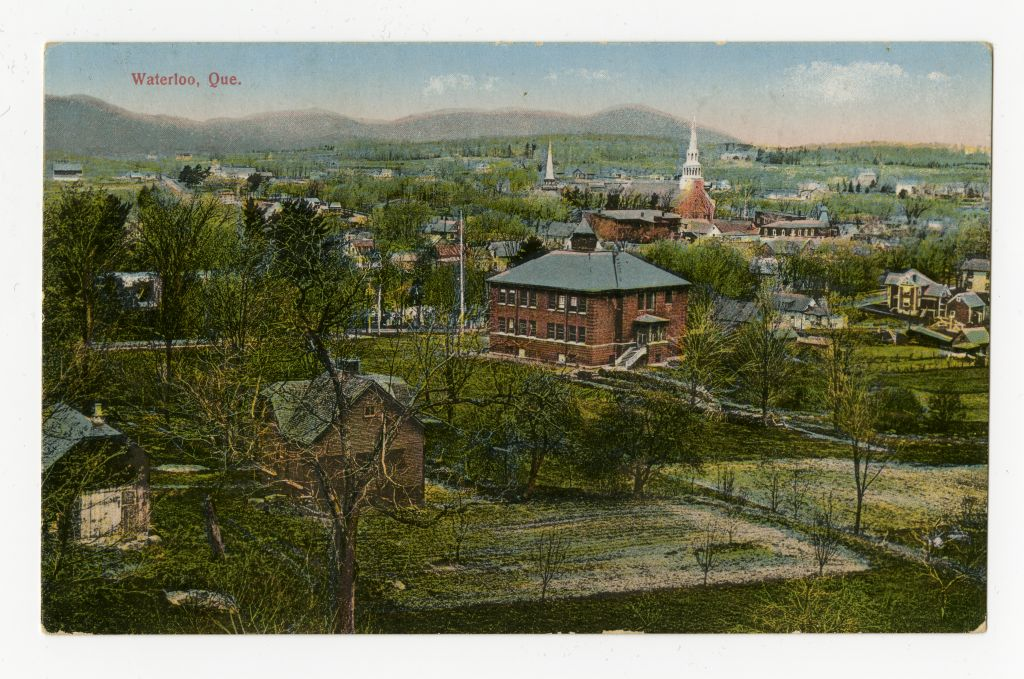
Waterloo on a postcard dating from between about 1903 and 1931

A second railway company, the Waterloo and Magog Railway Company, was incorporated in 1871. It built a 23 mi (37 km) line between Waterloo and Magog and also operated the Missisquoi Valley Railway. The line was operated under contract by the Central Vermont until 1887, when the Waterloo and Magog company was acquired by the Atlantic and North Western Railway, part of the Canadian Pacific Railway system.

Waterloo received city status in 1890.

=== Industry in the 20th century ===
Furniture manufacturing had a long presence in Waterloo. The Roxton Mill & Chair Company was established in Roxton Falls in 1904. Three years later its owners bought the Waterloo Wood Company, itself founded in 1894, and consolidated the business at Waterloo. The plant initially specialized in chairs and was producing more than 50,000 a year for markets across Canada shortly after the move. In August 2005, the company announced that the Waterloo plant would close that autumn, with about 100 workers being told that their employment would end on 7 October.

Commercial mushroom growing was another local industry. Charles and Fred Slack began experimenting with mushroom cultivation in 1925, using three purpose-built wooden rooms on land adjoining the family's greenhouses. Three more buildings were added the following year as production increased. Production slowed during the Second World War and expanded again afterward; over the following two decades the Slack operation increased its output fivefold.

Waterloo and the rest of La Haute-Yamaska were part of the administrative region of Montérégie until 2021. On 28 July of that year, the Quebec government transferred both La Haute-Yamaska and Brome-Missisquoi to the Estrie administrative region.

== Geography ==
Aerial view of Lac Waterloo

Waterloo forms an enclave within the township municipality of Shefford, which surrounds it on every side. The North Yamaska River crosses the city. Lac Waterloo lies in the centre-east of the municipal territory and covers approximately 1.3 km^{2} (0.50 sq mi).

The lake is shallow. It has been monitored through Quebec's Réseau de surveillance volontaire des lacs. In 2024, summer measurements averaged 28 µg/L of total phosphorus, 24 µg/L of chlorophyll a and 7.5 mg/L of dissolved organic carbon. Mean Secchi-disk transparency was 1.8 m (5.9 ft). The province placed the lake's overall trophic condition in the probable transition zone between mesotrophic and eutrophic and described it as being at an advanced intermediate stage of eutrophication.

== Demographics ==
In the 2021 Census of Population, Waterloo had 4,920 residents, compared with 4,410 in 2016, an increase of 11.6 per cent. There were 2,242 occupied private dwellings out of 2,404 total private dwellings. With a land area of 12.23 km^{2} (4.72 sq mi), the population density was 402.2 people per square kilometre.

The median age in 2021 was 42.8 years.

=== Language ===
French was the mother tongue of 4,025 people, or 83.1 per cent of single mother-tongue responses in 2021. English accounted for 615 people, or 12.7 per cent.

Knowledge of official languages, 2021
Knowledge	Population	%
French only	2,440	50.4
English and French	2,150	44.4
English only	250	5.2
Neither English nor French	5	0.1

== Government ==
Waterloo is governed by a mayor and six councillors. Pascal Russell was elected mayor in the 2025 municipal election.

For federal elections, Waterloo is in the district of Shefford, represented by Andréanne Larouche. Under Quebec's 2026 electoral map, Waterloo is within the provincial district of Daniel-Johnson, represented by Nathalie Boisclair.

Town Council of Waterloo
District	Councilor	Party
Mayor	Pascal Russell	Équipe Pascal Russell
1	Pierre-Paul Foisy	Équipe Pascal Russell
2	Pierre-Richard Côté	Équipe Pascal Russell
3	Barbara Verhoef	Nous, vous, Ensemble
4	Bridgitte Hémond	Nous, vous, Ensemble
5	Loric Vautour-Ouellet	Independent
6	Pierre Brien	Independent

== Culture and heritage ==
Waterloo retains a number of houses, churches and institutional buildings dating from its 19th-century growth. A municipal audio heritage trail, based on historical material credited to the Société d'histoire de la Haute-Yamaska, contains 22 points of interest in the city.

Selected heritage buildings
Building	Date	Description
Saint-Luke Anglican Church	1867–1870	The present Saint-Luke church replaced a wooden Anglican church built in 1843. Designed by Thomas Seaton Scott in the Gothic Revival style, it was built on land donated by Asa Belknap Foster. The church was classified as a Quebec heritage immovable in 1978.
Maplewood Manor	1864–1865	Built as Asa Belknap Foster's principal residence from plans by Montreal architect John William Hopkins, Maplewood later became a convent occupied by the Sisters of the Holy Names of Jesus and Mary. Waterloo cited the property as a heritage immovable in 2013.
Former Universalist Church	1870	The Universalist church was erected in 1870 and consecrated in February 1871. The local Masonic lodge bought the building in 1913. After the lodge gradually ceased using it, the former church became the Maison de la culture de Waterloo around the beginning of the 1990s.

The Waterloo Cemetery, bounded by de la Cour, Saint-Joseph and Shaw streets, contains more than 1,000 gravestones. Its oldest gravestone dates from 1810. Anglican, Methodist, Congregationalist and Universalist families from Waterloo and neighbouring communities are represented there.

== Education ==
French-language primary education is provided at the Notre-Dame and St-Bernardin pavilions of École l'Orée-des-Cantons. Waterloo Elementary School is an English-language primary school. École secondaire Wilfrid-Léger provides secondary education in the city.

== Transportation ==
Waterloo is served by Autoroute 10 and provincial routes 112, 241 and 243.

Three regional cycling routes provide access to Waterloo and Parc du Lac Waterloo: the Estriade, the Campagnarde and the Montagnarde. The Estriade forms part of Quebec's Route Verte network and connects Waterloo with Granby.

The city's 19th-century railway history is reflected in a small railway museum at the Vélo-Parc, housed in a former caboose. Its exhibits cover Waterloo's rail network and Asa Belknap Foster.

== Sister city ==
Waterloo has been twinned with Waterloo, Belgium, since June 1957.

== Notable people ==
- John Rudolphus Booth (1827–1925), lumber and railway industrialist, was born near Waterloo.
- Asa Belknap Foster (1817–1877), railway contractor and politician, settled in Waterloo in 1852 and became the municipality's first mayor in 1867.
- Lucius Seth Huntington (1827–1886), lawyer, journalist and politician, moved his newspaper from Knowlton to Waterloo in 1857 while serving as secretary of the Stanstead, Shefford and Chambly Railroad. He later brought forward the allegations that became the Pacific Scandal in 1873.

== See also ==
- List of cities in Quebec
- Eastern Townships
