= Saint-Joachim-de-Shefford =

- Municipality
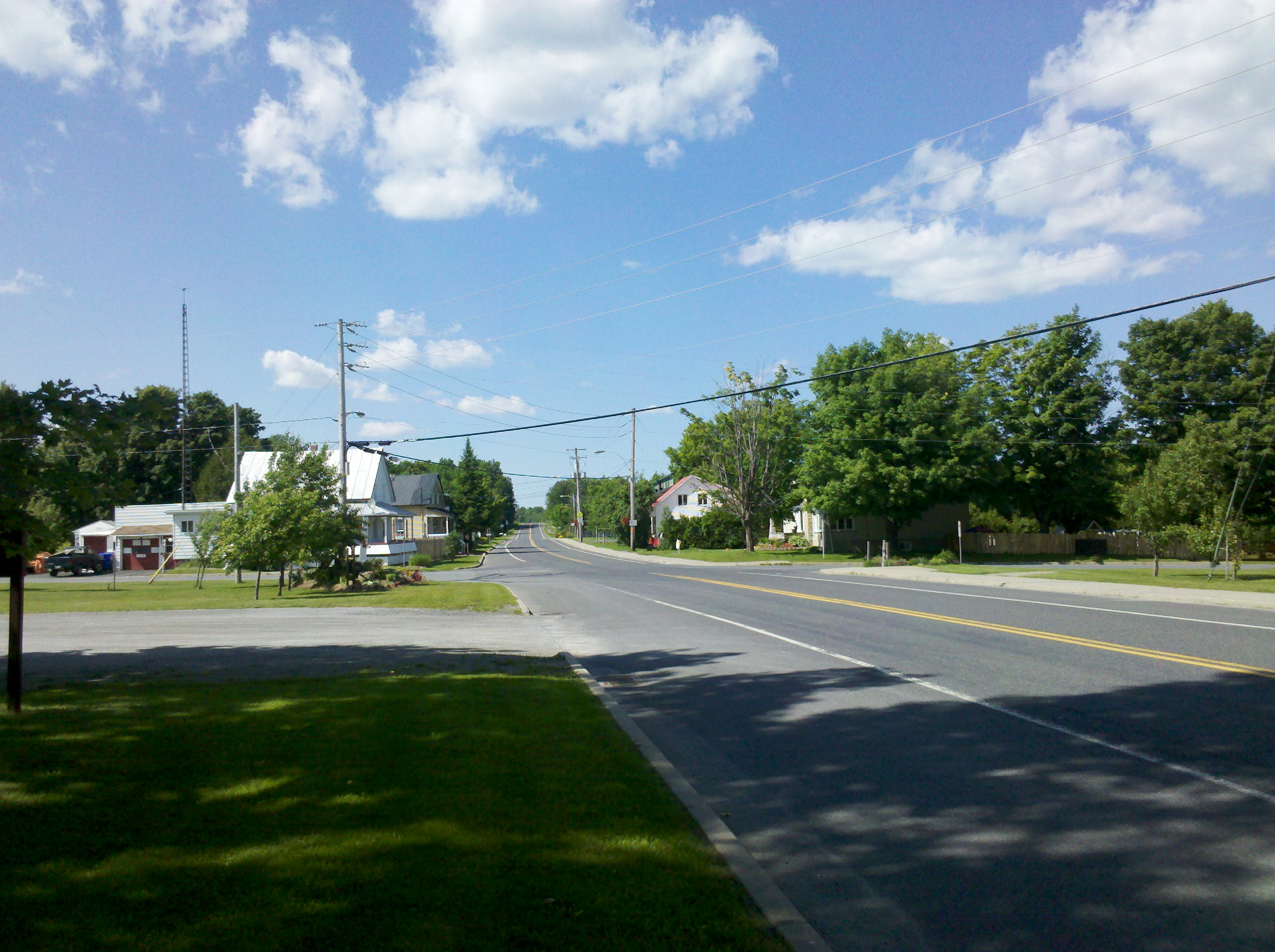
- Principal Street

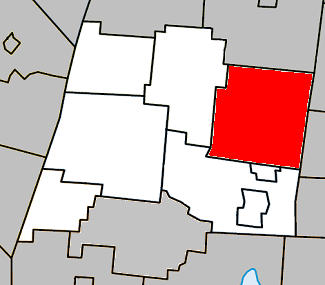
- Location within La Haute-Yamaska RCM

- Location in southern Quebec
- Coordinates: 45°27′N 72°32′W
- Country: Canada
- Province: Quebec
- Region: Estrie
- RCM: La Haute-Yamaska
- Constituted: June 10, 1884
- Named for: Joachim and Shefford County

Government
  - Mayor: René Beauregard
  - Federal riding: Shefford
  - Prov. riding: Daniel-Johnson

Area
  - Total: 129.20 km^{2} (49.88 sq mi)
  - Land: 126.91 km^{2} (49.00 sq mi)

Population (2021)
  - Total: 1,476
  - Density: 11.6/km^{2} (30/sq mi)
  - Pop 2016-2021: ▲13.5%
  - Dwellings: 609
- Time zone: UTC−05:00 (EST)
  - Summer (DST): UTC−04:00 (EDT)
- Postal code(s): J0E 2G0
- Area codes: 450 and 579
- Highways: R-241; R-243
- Website: www.st-joachim.ca

Saint-Joachim-de-Shefford (French pronunciation: [sɛ̃ ʒɔaʃɛ̃ də ʃɛfɚd, -fœʁd]) is a municipality in the Canadian province of Quebec, located within La Haute-Yamaska Regional County Municipality. The population as of the 2021 Canadian census was 1,476.

== Demographics ==
=== Population ===
Population trend:

Census	Population	Change (%)
2021	1,476	▲13.5%
2016	1,301	▲11.1%
2011	1,171	▲7.5%
2006	1,089	▼6.0%
2001	1,159	▲1.5%
1996	1,142	▲2.8%
1991	1,111	▲1.7%
1986	1,092	▲0.8%
1981	1,083	▲10.8%
1976	977	▲6.5%
1971	917	▲3.9%
1966	883	▼3.0%
1961	910	▲3.1%
1956	883	▼7.9%
1951	959	▼1.5%
1941	974	▼6.2%
1931	1,038	▲0.1%
1921	1,037	▼6.6%
1911	1,110	▼1.4%
1901	1,126	▼1.4%
1891	1,142	N/A

=== Language ===
Mother tongue (2021)

Language	Population	Pct (%)
French only	1,375	93.2%
English only	70	4.7%
Both English and French	20	1.4%
Other languages	10	0.7%

== See also ==
- List of municipalities in Quebec
