= Étienne-Alexis Boucher =

Canadian politician

MNA for Johnson
- In office 2008–2012
- Preceded by: Éric Charbonneau
- Succeeded by: Yves-François Blanchet

Personal details
- Party: Parti Québécois

Étienne-Alexis Boucher is a Canadian politician. Boucher was elected to represent the riding of Johnson in the National Assembly of Quebec in the 2008 provincial election. He is a member of the Parti Québécois.

Boucher is a graduate from the Université de Montréal where he obtained a bachelor's degree in political sciences and started studies for the master's degree in the same field.

Boucher defeated the ADQ's Éric Charbonneau to gain the seat which was previously held before by his father Claude Boucher (who served from 1994 to 2007) whom he served as his press secretary. He was also a municipal councillor for the municipality of Saint-Denis-de-Brompton as well as a school commissioner for the Saint-Hyacinthe School Board.

Following an electoral redistribution, Boucher ran in the district of Richmond in the 2012 election but was defeated by Karine Vallières.

In the 2014 election, he ran in the riding of Richmond but was again defeated.
