= Éric Charbonneau =

Canadian politician

MNA for Johnson
- In office April 25, 2007 – November 5, 2008
- Preceded by: Claude Boucher
- Succeeded by: Étienne-Alexis Boucher

Personal details
- Born: July 11, 1969 (age 56) Montreal, Quebec, Canada
- Party: Action démocratique du Québec
- Spouse: Nathalie Bernard

Éric Charbonneau (born July 11, 1969) is a politician from Quebec, Canada. He was an Action démocratique du Québec Member of the National Assembly for the electoral district of Johnson from 2007 to 2008.

Born in Montreal, Quebec, Charbonneau graduated from the Université de Sherbrooke with a bachelor and master's degree in economics. He worked as an economist of the Quebec Ministry of Transportation and the Ministries of Energy and Natural Resources before working in management and planning as well as a foreman before his election in various local companies in the Drummondville and Acton Vale areas in the Bois-Francs region.

Charbonneau was first elected in the 2007 election with 36% of the vote. Parti Québécois incumbent Claude Boucher, finished a close second with 35% of the vote. Charbonneau took office on April 12, 2007.

He was elected mayor of Acton Vale in 2009.
