= La Haute-Yamaska Regional County Municipality =

La Haute-Yamaska
- Regional county municipality
- Coordinates: 45°24′N 72°44′W
- Country: Canada
- Province: Quebec
- Region: Estrie
- Effective: March 3, 1982
- County seat: Granby

Government
  - Type: Prefecture
  - Prefect: Pascal Russell

Area
  - Total: 650.40 km^{2} (251.12 sq mi)
  - Land: 636.00 km^{2} (245.56 sq mi)

Population (2021)
  - Total: 92,796
  - Density: 145.9/km^{2} (378/sq mi)
  - Change 2016-2021: ▲5.1%
  - Dwellings: 41,563
- Time zone: UTC−5 (EST)
  - Summer (DST): UTC−4 (EDT)
- Area codes: 450 and 579
- Website: www.haute-yamaska.ca

La Haute-Yamaska (French pronunciation: [la ot jamaska], lit. 'The Upper Yamaska') is a regional county municipality in the Estrie region of Quebec, Canada. Its seat is Granby.

It is named for its position at the height of the Yamaska River, which cuts through its southern part. It rises at Brome Lake located in neighbouring Brome-Missisquoi Regional County Municipality.

On January 1, 2010, the city of Bromont left La Haute-Yamaska; it was reclassified to the Brome-Missisquoi RCM.

In 2021, it was transferred to the Estrie region from Montérégie.

== Subdivisions ==
There are 8 subdivisions within the RCM:

Cities & Towns (2)

- Granby
- Waterloo

Municipalities (4)

- Roxton Pond
- Saint-Alphonse-de-Granby
- Saint-Joachim-de-Shefford
- Sainte-Cécile-de-Milton

Townships (1)

- Shefford

Villages (1)

- Warden

== Demographics ==
Mother tongue from Canada 2021 Census

Language	Population	Pct (%)
French only	83,715	91.6%
English only	2,835	3.1%
Both English and French	1,075	1.2%
Other languages	3,330	3.6%

== Highways ==
Highways and numbered routes that run through the municipality, including external routes that start or finish at the county border:

- Autoroutes
  - A-10
- Principal Highways
  - R-112
  - R-137
  - R-139
- Secondary Highways
  - R-211
  - R-241
  - R-243
- External Routes
  - None
