= Roxton Pond =

- Municipality
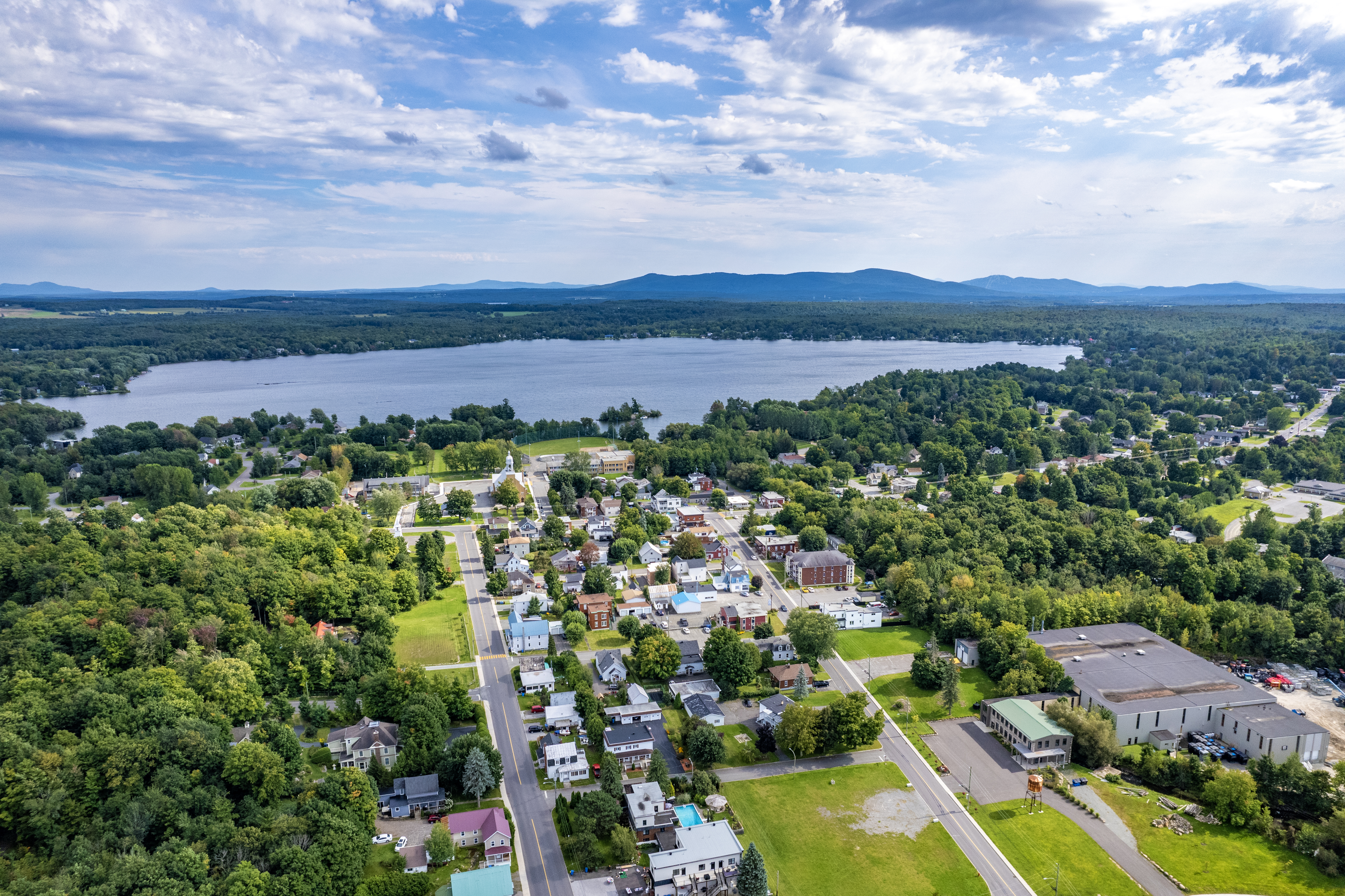
- Aerial view of Roxton Pond

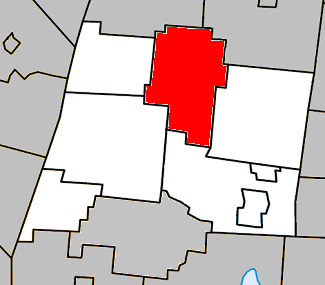
- Location within La Haute-Yamaska RCM

- Location in southern Quebec
- Coordinates: 45°29′N 72°40′W
- Country: Canada
- Province: Quebec
- Region: Estrie
- RCM: La Haute-Yamaska
- Constituted: December 17, 1997

Government
  - Mayor: Pierre Fontaine
  - Federal riding: Shefford
  - Prov. riding: Daniel-Johnson

Area
  - Total: 103.40 km^{2} (39.92 sq mi)
  - Land: 97.64 km^{2} (37.70 sq mi)

Population (2021)
  - Total: 4,224
  - Density: 43.3/km^{2} (112/sq mi)
  - Pop 2016-2021: ▲10.9%
  - Dwellings: 1,840
- Time zone: UTC−05:00 (EST)
  - Summer (DST): UTC−04:00 (EDT)
- Postal code(s): J0E 1Z0
- Area codes: 450 and 579
- Highways: R-139
- Website: www.roxtonpond.ca

Roxton Pond is a municipality in the Canadian province of Quebec, located within La Haute-Yamaska Regional County Municipality. The population as of the 2021 Canadian Census was 4,224. The municipality was created in 1997 with the merger of the Parish and the Village of Roxton Pond.

== History ==
It was from 1790 that the British government of Canada divided the lands east of the Richelieu River valley into townships. The townships were largely granted to loyalists who, in exchange, had to commit to populating these territories to develop colonization.

Roxton Township, which included present-day Roxton Pond, Roxton and Roxton Falls, was given in 1803 to Elizabeth Ruite, widow of a military commander. In 1895, a first municipality was created under the name Sainte-Pudentienne. In 1886, the village and parish of Sainte-Pudentienne are split to form two distinct municipalities and will both change their name to Roxton Pond in 1985, nearly a hundred years later. Finally, the village and parish merges in 1997 to form the current municipality of Roxton Pond.

== Demographics ==
=== Population ===
Population trend:

Census	Population	Change (%)
2021	4,224	▲10.9%
2016	3,809	▲0.6%
2011	3,786	▲5.2%
2006	3,599	▲2.0%
2001	3,527	N/A

=== Language ===
Mother tongue language (2021)

Language	Population	Pct (%)
French only	4,070	96.4%
English only	70	1.7%
Both English and French	40	0.9%
Other languages	35	0.8%

== Attractions ==
The Yamaska National Park is located in Roxton Pond.

== See also ==
- List of municipalities in Quebec
- 20th-century municipal history of Quebec
