= Daniel-Johnson =

Provincial electoral district in Quebec, Canada

Coordinates: 45.662°N 72.566°W

Quebec electoral district

Provincial electoral district
- Legislature: National Assembly of Quebec
MNA
Nathalie Boisclair
Parti Québécois
- District created: 1972
- First contested: 1973
- Last contested: 2026

Demographics
- Population (2011): 72,715
- Electors (2012): 56,201
- Area (km²): 1,794.4
- Pop. density (per km²): 40.5
- Census subdivision(s): Acton Vale, Béthanie, Roxton, Roxton Falls, Roxton Pond, Sainte-Cécile-de-Milton, Sainte-Christine, Sainte-Hélène-de-Bagot, Saint-Joachim-de-Shefford, Saint-Nazaire-d'Acton, Saint-Théodore-d'Acton, Saint-Valérien-de-Milton, Upton, Saint-Liboire, Saint-Dominique, Saint-Pie, Warden, Waterloo, Shefford, Sainte-Anne-de-la-Rochelle, Lawrencville, Bonsecours, Valcourt (township), Valcourt (city), Maricourt, Racine

Daniel-Johnson is a provincial electoral district in Quebec, Canada.

It was created for the 1973 election as Johnson from parts of Bagot, Drummond, Richmond and Shefford electoral districts.

In the change from the 2001 to the 2011 electoral map, it changed its territory considerably, losing its eastern parts including part of the city of Sherbrooke, and gaining territory to the north, including part of the city of Drummondville.

In 2026, the riding was renamed Daniel-Johnson. In the process, it gained the municipalities of Saint-Liboire, Saint-Dominique, Saint-Pie, Warden, Waterloo, Shefford, Sainte-Anne-de-la-Rochelle, Lawrencville, Bonsecours, Valcourt (township), Valcourt (city), Maricourt, Racine, while losing the municipalities of Saint-Majorique-de-Grantham, Saint-Edmond-de-Grantham, Saint-Eugène, Saint-Germain-de-Grantham, Wickham, Lefebvre, L'Avenir, Durham-Sud and all of its territory in Drummondville to the new riding of Marie-Lacoste-Gérin-Lajoie.

The riding named in honour of former Quebec Premier Daniel Johnson Sr. who served as leader of the province from 1966 until his death in 1968.

== Members of the National Assembly ==
Legislature	Years	Member	Party
Johnson
Riding created from Bagot, Drummond, Richmond and Shefford
30th	1973–1974	Jean-Claude Boutin	Liberal
30th	1974–1976	Maurice Bellemare	Union Nationale
31st	1976–1979	Maurice Bellemare	Union Nationale
31st	1980–1981	Camille Picard	Liberal
32nd	1981–1985	Carmen Juneau	Parti Québécois
33rd	1985–1989	Carmen Juneau	Parti Québécois
34th	1989–1994	Carmen Juneau	Parti Québécois
35th	1994–1998	Claude Boucher	Parti Québécois
36th	1998–2003	Claude Boucher	Parti Québécois
37th	2003–2007	Claude Boucher	Parti Québécois
38th	2007–2008	Éric Charbonneau	Action démocratique
39th	2008–2012	Étienne-Alexis Boucher	Parti Québécois
40th	2012–2014	Yves-François Blanchet	Parti Québécois
41st	2014–2018	André Lamontagne	Coalition Avenir Québec
42nd	2018–2022	André Lamontagne	Coalition Avenir Québec
43rd	2022–2026	André Lamontagne	Coalition Avenir Québec
Daniel-Johnson
44th	2026–Present	Nathalie Boisclair	Parti Québécois

== Election results ==
2026 Quebec general election
** Preliminary results — Not yet official **
Party	Candidate	Votes	%	±%
Parti Québécois	Nathalie Boisclair	11,983	34.70	+19.08
Conservative	Marc Distexhe	8,587	24.87	+10.99
Liberal	Eric Sévigny	5,785	16.75	+12.13
Coalition Avenir Québec	Christine Nadeau	5,172	14.98	–35.62
Québec solidaire	Tony Martel	3,002	8.69	–5.27
Total valid votes		34,529	98.07	–0.14
Total rejected ballots		680	1.93	+0.14
Turnout		35,209	71.15	+3.51
Electors on the lists		49,485		
Parti Québécois notional gain from Coalition Avenir Québec		Swing		+4.05
Source: Élections Québec

2022 Quebec general election redistributed results
Party	Vote	%
Coalition Avenir Québec	14,912	50.60
Parti Québécois	4,602	15.62
Québec solidaire	4,110	13.96
Conservative	4,091	13.88
Liberal	1,360	4.62
Others	393	1.33

2022 Quebec general election: Johnson
Party	Candidate	Votes	%	±%
Coalition Avenir Québec	André Lamontagne	21,944	52.50	-0.46
Conservative	Luce Daneau	6,323	15.13	+13.53
Parti Québécois	Jérémie Poirier	6,024	14.41	+1.25
Québec solidaire	Nancy Mongeau	5,769	13.80	-4.07
Liberal	Mounirou Younoussa	1,469	3.51	-7.54
Démocratie directe	Cindy Courtemanche	271	0.65	–
Total valid votes		41,800	98.21	–
Total rejected ballots		763	1.79	–
Turnout		42,563	67.64	
Electors on the lists		62,928	–	–

2018 Quebec general election: Johnson
Party	Candidate	Votes	%	±%
Coalition Avenir Québec	André Lamontagne	20,902	52.96	+16.9
Québec solidaire	Sarah Saint-Cyr Lanoie	7,051	17.87	+11.61
Parti Québécois	Jacques Tétreault	5,194	13.16	-18
Liberal	François Vaes	4,362	11.05	-12.64
Green	Émile Coderre	745	1.89	
Conservative	Jean-François Vignola	630	1.6	+0.91
New Democratic	Andrew Leblanc-Marcil	302	0.77	
Citoyens au pouvoir	Yves Audet	280	0.71	
Total valid votes		39,466	97.71	
Total rejected ballots		923	2.29	
Turnout		40,389	67.47	
Eligible voters		59,862		
Coalition Avenir Québec hold		Swing		+2.645
Source(s) "Rapport des résultats officiels du scrutin". Élections Québec.

2014 Quebec general election
Party	Candidate	Votes	%
Coalition Avenir Québec	André Lamontagne	13,621	36.06
Parti Québécois	Yves-François Blanchet	11,768	31.16
Liberal	Brigitte Mercier	8,946	23.69
Québec solidaire	François Desrochers	2,365	6.26
Parti nul	Sébastien Gauthier	502	1.33
Option nationale	Magali Doucet	304	0.80
Conservative	Benoit Lussier	262	0.69
Total valid votes		37,768	98.04
Total rejected ballots		755	1.96
Turnout		38,523	67.44
Electors on the lists		57,123	–

2012 Quebec general election
Party	Candidate	Votes	%	±%
Parti Québécois	Yves-François Blanchet	15,007	36.16	+1.34
Coalition Avenir Québec	Stéphane Legault	14,804	35.67	+5.16
Liberal	Nancy Boyce	8,434	20.32	-9.55
Québec solidaire	Julie Dionne	1,887	4.55	+1.57
Option nationale	Steve Lemay	889	2.14	
Conservative	Benoit Lussier	479	1.15	

^ Change is from redistributed results; CAQ change is from ADQ

2008 Quebec general election
Party	Candidate	Votes	%	±%
Parti Québécois	Étienne-Alexis Boucher	11,012	40.25	
Liberal	Denis Morin	8,478	30.99	
Action démocratique	Éric Charbonneau	6,318	23.09	
Green	Pierre-Olivier Jette	919	3.36	–
Québec solidaire	Colombe Landry	634	2.32	

2007 Quebec general election
Party	Candidate	Votes	%
Action démocratique	Éric Charbonneau	11,511	36.02
Parti Québécois	Claude Boucher	11,331	35.46
Liberal	Nicole Brouillette	7,157	22.40
Green	Benoit Lapierre	1,188	3.72
Québec solidaire	Marcel Pinard	770	2.41
Total valid votes		31,957	98.87
Total rejected ballots		366	1.13
Turnout		32,323	75.01
Electors on the lists		43,092	–

2003 Quebec general election
Party	Candidate	Votes	%
Parti Québécois	Claude Boucher	12,232	40.62
Liberal	Nicole Brouillette	10,700	35.54
Action démocratique	Isabelle Marquis	6,612	21.96
UFP	Martin Marois	343	1.14
Christian Democracy	Michel Bélanger	224	0.74
Total valid votes		30,111	98.61
Total rejected ballots		423	1.39
Turnout		30,534	72.74
Electors on the lists		41,975	–

1998 Quebec general election
Party	Candidate	Votes	%
Parti Québécois	Claude Boucher	14,292	48.33
Liberal	Marie Marier	11,163	37.75
Action démocratique	Isabelle Marquis	3,824	12.93
Socialist Democracy	Patrice Côté	290	0.98
Total valid votes		29,569	98.87
Total rejected ballots		337	1.13
Turnout		29,906	80.96
Electors on the lists		36,940	–

1995 Quebec referendum
Side	Votes	%
Oui	17,507	54.41
Non	14,672	45.59

1994 Quebec general election
Party	Candidate	Votes	%
Parti Québécois	Claude Boucher	13,247	49.78
Liberal	Michel Daviau	12,001	45.10
Equality	Simon Langeveld	732	2.75
Natural Law	Anne-Marie Marois	630	2.37
Total valid votes		26,610	96.82
Total rejected ballots		873	3.18
Turnout		27,483	81.13
Electors on the lists		33,877	–

1992 Charlottetown Accord referendum
Side	Votes	%
Non	16,702	61.82
Oui	10,317	38.18

1989 Quebec general election
Party	Candidate	Votes	%
Parti Québécois	Carmen Juneau	12,731	49.22
Liberal	Denis Laflamme	11,590	44.81
Green	Sylvain Guilbert	461	1.78
Unity	Marlene McCourt	401	1.55
Parti 51	Yvan Lapointe	257	0.99
Independent	Serge Desmarais	238	0.92
New Democratic	Jean-Marie Fréchette	185	0.72
Total valid votes		25,863	98.43
Total rejected ballots		413	1.57
Turnout		26,276	76.48
Electors on the lists		33,481	–

1985 Quebec general election
Party	Candidate	Votes	%
Parti Québécois	Carmen Juneau	13,644	51.58
Liberal	Camille Picard	11,972	45.26
Union Nationale	Lionel Eymard	476	1.80
Independent	Jean-Paul Côté	262	0.99
Christian Socialism	Johanne Dufour	99	0.37
Total valid votes		26,453	98.77
Total rejected ballots		329	1.23
Turnout		26,782	79.57
Electors on the lists		33,658	–

1981 Quebec general election
Party	Candidate	Votes	%
Parti Québécois	Carmen Juneau	13,131	47.90
Liberal	Camille Picard	12,325	44.96
Union Nationale	Marie Charest	1,959	7.14
Total valid votes		27,415	99.32
Total rejected ballots		187	0.68
Turnout		27,602	85.31
Electors on the lists		32,355	–

Quebec provincial by-election, 1980
Party	Candidate	Votes	%
Liberal	Camille Picard	9,200	41.15
Parti Québécois	Carmen Juneau	8,828	39.48
Union Nationale	Marie Charest	4,233	18.93
Social Credit	Rodolphe Lemieux	98	0.44
Total valid votes		22,359	99.31
Total rejected ballots		156	0.69
Turnout		22,515	69.59
Electors on the lists		32,353	–

1980 Quebec referendum
Side	Votes	%
Non	16,504	60.87
Oui	10,609	39.13

1976 Quebec general election
Party	Candidate	Votes	%
Union Nationale	Maurice Bellemare	11,184	45.33
Parti Québécois	Robert Normand	6,379	25.85
Liberal	Marcel Noël	5,348	21.68
Ralliement créditiste	Jules Degready	1,761	7.14
Total valid votes		24,672	98.62
Total rejected ballots		344	1.38
Turnout		25,016	86.65
Electors on the lists		28,870	–

Quebec provincial by-election, 1974
Party	Candidate	Votes	%
Union Nationale	Maurice Bellemare	7,880	41.28
Liberal	Jean-Claude Boutin	6,797	35.60
Parti Québécois	Jean-Denis BAchand	4,165	21.82
Independent créditiste	Gabriel Lacasse	248	1.30
Total valid votes		19,090	98.31
Total rejected ballots		328	1.69
Turnout		19,418	71.43
Electors on the lists		27,183	–

1973 Quebec general election
Party	Candidate	Votes	%
Liberal	Jean-Claude Boutin	10,543	48.20
Ralliement créditiste	Albert Claude	6,603	30.19
Parti Québécois	Jean-Paul Guillemette	3,597	16.44
Union Nationale	Léopold Houle	1,130	5.17
Total valid votes		21,873	99.05
Total rejected ballots		210	0.95
Turnout		22,083	82.05
Electors on the lists		26,914	–

== See also ==
- List of Quebec provincial electoral districts
- Canadian provincial electoral districts
