= André Lamontagne =

Canadian politician

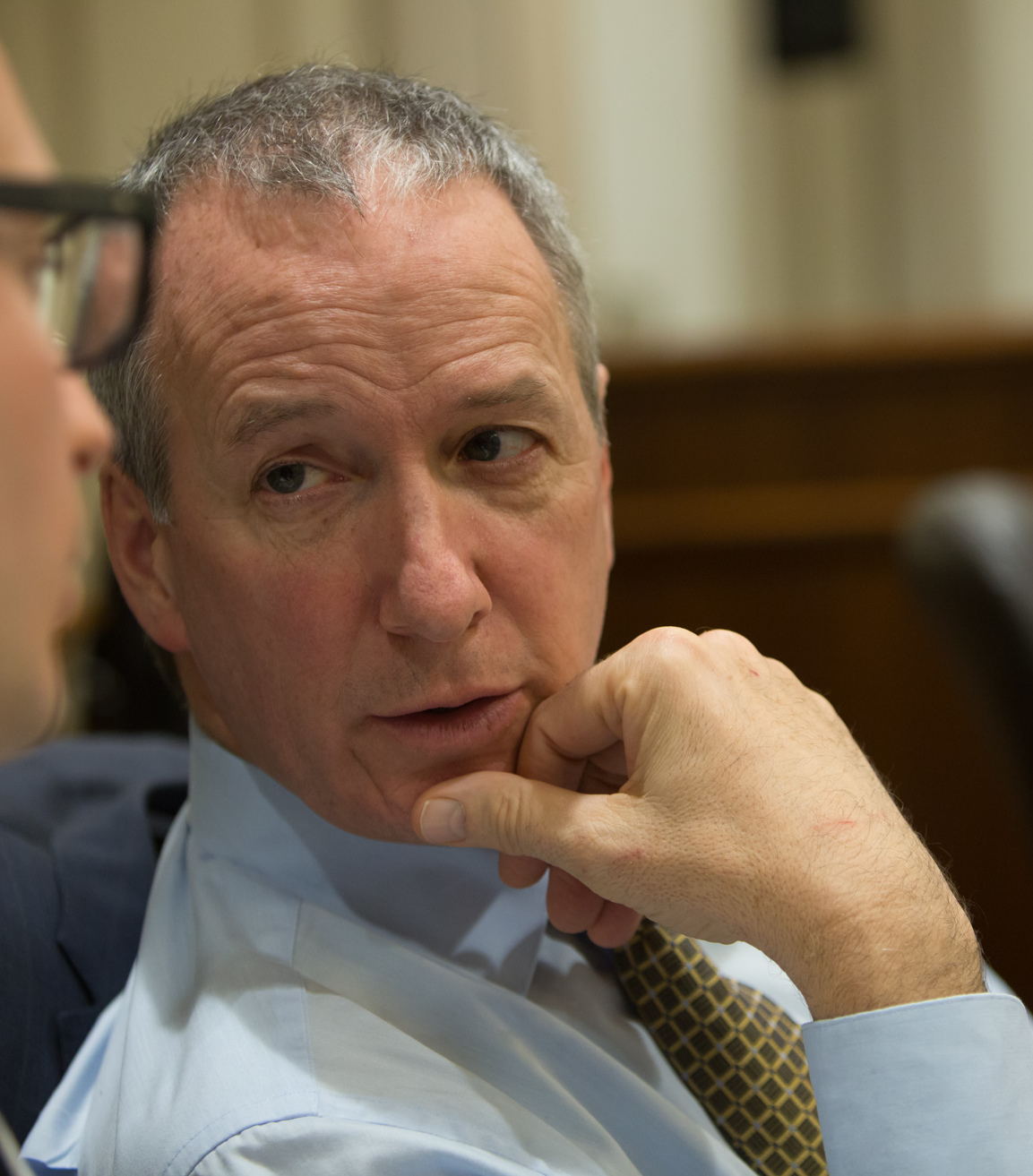
- Lamontagne in 2015

Member of the National Assembly of Quebec for Johnson
- In office April 7, 2014 – August 27, 2026
- Preceded by: Yves-François Blanchet
- Succeeded by: Nathalie Boisclair

Personal details
- Born: June 2, 1960 (age 66) Saint-Félicien, Quebec
- Party: Coalition Avenir Québec

André Lamontagne (born June 2, 1960) is a Canadian politician who was elected to the National Assembly of Quebec in the 2014 election. He represented the electoral district of Johnson as a member of the Coalition Avenir Québec until 2026. He was the Minister of Agriculture, Fisheries and Food as well as the Minister Responsible for the Centre-du-Québec region, until 2025. He did not seek re-election in the 2026 general election.

== Electoral record ==
2022 Quebec general election: Johnson
Party	Candidate	Votes	%	±%
Coalition Avenir Québec	André Lamontagne	21,944	52.50	-0.46
Conservative	Luce Daneau	6,323	15.13	+13.53
Parti Québécois	Jérémie Poirier	6,024	14.41	+1.25
Québec solidaire	Nancy Mongeau	5,769	13.80	-4.07
Liberal	Mounirou Younoussa	1,469	3.51	-7.54
Démocratie directe	Cindy Courtemanche	271	0.65	–
Total valid votes		41,800	98.21	–
Total rejected ballots		763	1.79	–
Turnout		42,563	67.64	
Electors on the lists		62,928	–	–

2018 Quebec general election: Johnson
Party	Candidate	Votes	%	±%
Coalition Avenir Québec	André Lamontagne	20,902	52.96	+16.9
Québec solidaire	Sarah Saint-Cyr Lanoie	7,051	17.87	+11.61
Parti Québécois	Jacques Tétreault	5,194	13.16	-18
Liberal	François Vaes	4,362	11.05	-12.64
Green	Émile Coderre	745	1.89	
Conservative	Jean-François Vignola	630	1.6	+0.91
New Democratic	Andrew Leblanc-Marcil	302	0.77	
Citoyens au pouvoir	Yves Audet	280	0.71	
Total valid votes		39,466	97.71	
Total rejected ballots		923	2.29	
Turnout		40,389	67.47	
Eligible voters		59,862		
Coalition Avenir Québec hold		Swing		+2.645
Source(s) "Rapport des résultats officiels du scrutin". Élections Québec.

2014 Quebec general election
Party	Candidate	Votes	%
Coalition Avenir Québec	André Lamontagne	13,621	36.06
Parti Québécois	Yves-François Blanchet	11,768	31.16
Liberal	Brigitte Mercier	8,946	23.69
Québec solidaire	François Desrochers	2,365	6.26
Parti nul	Sébastien Gauthier	502	1.33
Option nationale	Magali Doucet	304	0.80
Conservative	Benoit Lussier	262	0.69
Total valid votes		37,768	98.04
Total rejected ballots		755	1.96
Turnout		38,523	67.44
Electors on the lists		57,123	–
