= Nathalie Boisclair =

Quebec politician

Nathalie Boisclair MNA
- Nathalie Boisclair, September 2026

Member of the National Assembly for Daniel-Johnson
- Incumbent
- Assumed office October 5, 2026
- Preceded by: André Lamontagne

Personal details
- Party: Parti Québécois
- Education: Université de Montréal; Université de Sherbrooke

Nathalie Boisclair is a Quebec politician who was the elected to the National Assembly of Quebec for Daniel-Johnson in the 2026 Quebec general election as a member of the Parti Québécois. She holds a bachelor's degree in economics from the University of Montreal and a bachelor's degree in law from the University of Sherbrooke. She has worked in several school boards. She served as a municipal councillor for 10 years for Vieux-Saint-Hubert-La Savane in Longueuil.
