= Yves-François Blanchet =

Canadian politician, leader of the Bloc Québécois (born 1965)

Yves-François Blanchet MP
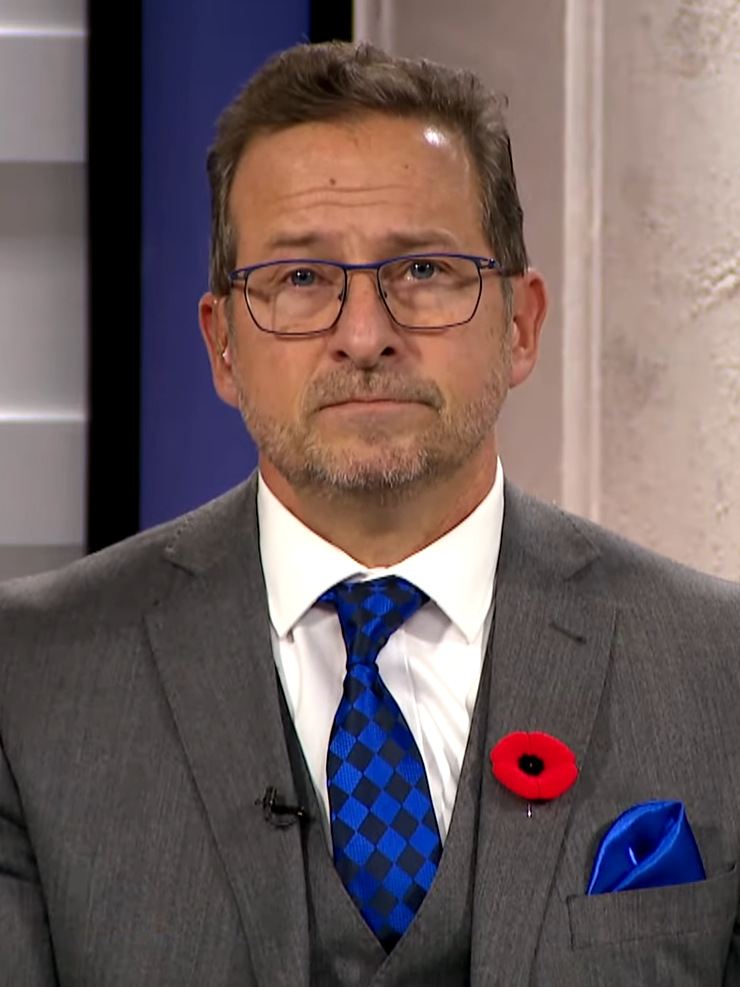
- Blanchet in 2023

Leader of the Bloc Québécois
- Incumbent
- Assumed office January 17, 2019
- President: Yves Perron
- Preceded by: Mario Beaulieu (interim)

Minister of Sustainable Development, Environment, Wildlife and Parks of Quebec
- In office December 4, 2012 – April 23, 2014
- Premier: Pauline Marois
- Preceded by: Daniel Breton
- Succeeded by: David Heurtel

Member of Parliament for Beloeil—Chambly
- Incumbent
- Assumed office October 21, 2019
- Preceded by: Matthew Dubé

Member of the National Assembly of Quebec for Johnson (Drummond; 2008–2012)
- In office December 8, 2008 – April 7, 2014
- Preceded by: Sébastien Schneeberger
- Succeeded by: André Lamontagne

Personal details
- Born: April 16, 1965 (age 61) Drummondville, Quebec, Canada
- Party: Bloc Québécois (federal)
- Other political affiliations: Parti Québécois (provincial)
- Spouse: Nancy Déziel
- Education: Université de Montréal (BA)

Yves-François Blanchet (Note: French: [iv fʁɑ̃swa blɑ̃ʃɛ]) (born April 14, 1965) is a Canadian politician who has served as the leader of the Bloc Québécois (BQ) and member of Parliament (MP) for Beloeil—Chambly since 2019.

Blanchet was born in Drummondville, Quebec, and graduated from the Université de Montréal. Prior to entering politics he ran an artist management firm and was the president of ADISQ from 2003 to 2006. Blanchet served as a Member of the National Assembly (MNA) for the Parti Québécois (PQ) from 2008 until his defeat in the 2014 election. He was Quebec's Minister of Sustainable Development, Environment, Wildlife and Parks from 2012 to 2014 under Premier Pauline Marois.

Blanchet was elected unopposed as leader of the Bloc Québécois in 2019, following Martine Ouellet's resignation the previous year. He was elected to parliament later that year, with the BQ increasing its number of seats from 10 in 2015 to 32 in 2019 and overtaking the New Democratic Party (NDP) to become the House of Commons' third-largest party. At the 2021 election, the BQ recorded a marginal increase in vote share and retained all its seats to remain as the third-largest party. In Blanchet's third election, in 2025, the BQ recorded a decrease in vote share and seats, while remaining the third-largest party in Parliament.

== Early life and education ==
Blanchet was born April 16, 1965, in Drummondville, Quebec, to Pierrette Bédard, a nurse, and Raymond Blanchet, a technician and lineman. He is a graduate from the Université de Montréal where he obtained a bachelor's degree in history and anthropology in 1987.

== Career ==
Blanchet later worked as a teacher and was a founder of an artist, disc and concert management firm, YFB Inc. while being the president of the ADISQ from 2003 to 2006. He was named the local business personality of the year by the Drummondville Chamber of Commerce, while he and associated artists received 10 Félix Awards.

Blanchet was elected to represent the riding of Drummond in the National Assembly of Quebec in the 2008 provincial election. In the 2012 election, he was reelected, this time in Johnson electoral district. A member of the Parti Québécois (PQ), Blanchet was Minister of Sustainable Development, Environment, Wildlife and Parks from 2012 until 2014. He was also a member of the Youth National Committee of the Parti Québécois in 1988 as well as a regional director of the PQ. He was defeated by Coalition Avenir Québec candidate André Lamontagne in the 2014 Quebec election.

Prior to becoming leader of the Bloc Québécois, he was a columnist with Le Nouvelliste, and appeared on the program Les Ex, on ICI RDI.

=== Leader of the Bloc Québécois (2018–present) ===
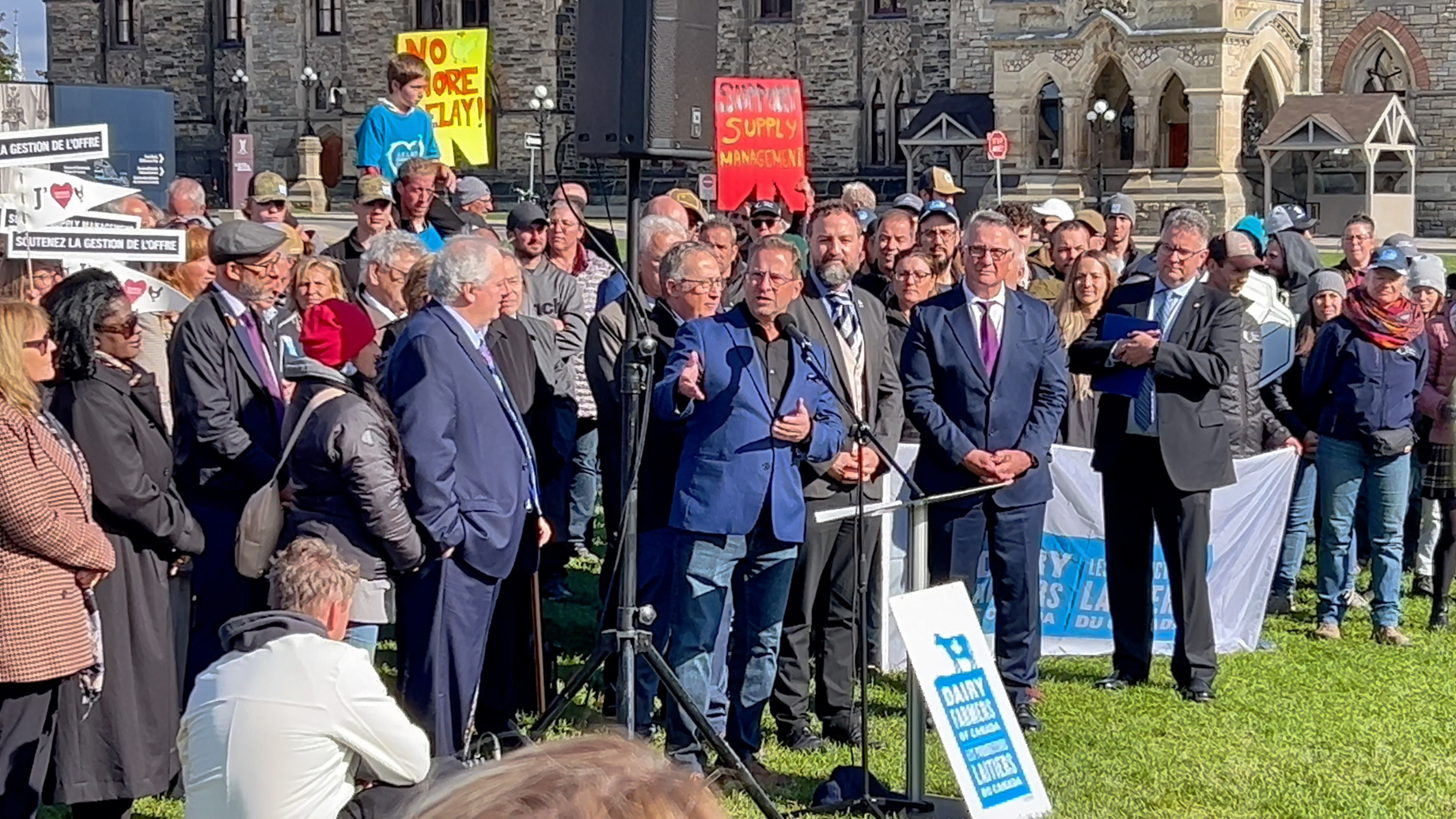
Blanchet at a press conference supporting Bill C-282 for supply management

On November 26, 2018, Blanchet announced his candidacy for the leadership of the Bloc Québécois. As no other candidate had entered the race by the time nominations closed on January 15, 2019, Blanchet was officially acclaimed leader on January 17, 2019.

Ahead of the 2019 federal election, BQ polling numbers rose to alignment towards those of the popular François Legault-led Coalition Avenir Québec (CAQ) provincial government. Blanchet won his seat of Beloeil—Chambly. Under Blanchet's leadership, the BQ increased its number of seats from 10 in 2015, to 32 seats in 2019, both overtaking the NDP to become the third-largest party in Canada and regaining official party status.

In the 2021 snap federal election, the Bloc Québécois led by Blanchet won 32 seats, unchanged from the prior election.

The Bloc Québécois held a leadership confidence vote in May 2023. Blanchet won 97 per cent of the vote.

According to most opinion polls, Blanchet entered the 2025 federal election in a weaker position than in 2021. This was credited to rising Canadian nationalism among the electorate following the 2025 United States trade war with Canada and Mexico. At the election, Blanchet retained his seat, while the BQ lost seats and decreased in the popular vote. Much of its support went to the governing Liberals.

== Personal life ==
Blanchet married and is now separated from Nancy Déziel. At the time of the 2025 Canadian federal election, he lived in Pointe-des-Cascades.

== Electoral record ==
=== Federal results ===
2025 Canadian federal election: Beloeil—Chambly
Party	Candidate	Votes	%	±%	Expenditures
Bloc Québécois	Yves-François Blanchet	32,844	48.26	−5.27	$48,548.98
Liberal	Nicholas Malouin	23,136	34.00	+10.57	$16,250.88
Conservative	Sylvain Goulet	9,199	13.52	+5.13	$5,887.39
New Democratic	Marie-Josée Béliveau	2,391	3.51	−5.01	$0.00
People's	Nicholas Manes	482	0.71	−1.31	$0.00
Total valid votes/expense limit		68,524	98.74	–	$136,720.49
Total rejected ballots		873	1.26		
Turnout		69,397	76.07		
Eligible voters		91,233			
Bloc Québécois notional hold		Swing		−7.92	
Source: Elections Canada
Note: number of eligible voters does not include voting day registrations.

2021 Canadian federal election: Beloeil—Chambly
Party	Candidate	Votes	%	±%	Expenditures
Bloc Québécois	Yves-François Blanchet	34,678	53.1	+2.5	$44,405.09
Liberal	Marie-Chantal Hamel	15,460	23.7	−0.1	$20,410.86
Conservative	Stéphane Robichaud	5,622	8.6	+2.8	$1,228.76
New Democratic	Marie-Josée Béliveau	5,525	8.5	−6.5	$1,187.30
People's	Danila Ejov	1,344	2.1	+1.5	$5.00
Green	Fabrice Gélinas Larrain	1,294	2.0	−2.7	$1,848.81
Free	Mario Grimard	845	1.3	—	$1,113.55
Marijuana	Benjamin Vachon	191	0.3	—	$0.00
Rhinoceros	Thomas Thibault-Vincent	185	0.3	—	$0.00
Indépendance du Québec	Michel Blondin	163	0.2	—	$0.00
Total valid votes/expense limit		65,324	98.3	—	$124,082.82
Total rejected ballots		1,109	1.7		
Turnout		66,433	68.7		
Eligible voters		96,633			
Bloc Québécois hold		Swing		+1.3	
Source: Elections Canada

2019 Canadian federal election: Beloeil—Chambly
Party	Candidate	Votes	%	±%	Expenditures
Bloc Québécois	Yves-François Blanchet	35,068	50.5	+22.82	$36,540.34
Liberal	Marie-Chantal Hamel	16,059	23.1	−6.24	$62,823.63
New Democratic	Matthew Dubé	10,086	14.5	−16.57	$20,636.78
Conservative	Véronique Laprise	4,305	6.2	−3.09	$0.00
Green	Pierre Carrier	3,255	4.7	+2.45	$18,235.50
People's	Chloé Bernard	512	0.7	—	$5,931.38
Indépendance du Québec	Michel Blondin	205	0.3	—	$768.82
Total valid votes/expense limit		69,490	100.0		
Total rejected ballots		1,064			
Turnout		70,554	73.7		
Eligible voters		95,723			
Bloc Québécois gain from New Democratic		Swing		+19.79	
Source: Elections Canada

=== Provincial results ===
2014 Quebec general election
Party	Candidate	Votes	%
Coalition Avenir Québec	André Lamontagne	13,621	36.06
Parti Québécois	Yves-François Blanchet	11,768	31.16
Liberal	Brigitte Mercier	8,946	23.69
Québec solidaire	François Desrochers	2,365	6.26
Parti nul	Sébastien Gauthier	502	1.33
Option nationale	Magali Doucet	304	0.80
Conservative	Benoit Lussier	262	0.69
Total valid votes		37,768	98.04
Total rejected ballots		755	1.96
Turnout		38,523	67.44
Electors on the lists		57,123	–

2012 Quebec general election
Party	Candidate	Votes	%	±%
Parti Québécois	Yves-François Blanchet	15,007	36.16	+1.34
Coalition Avenir Québec	Stéphane Legault	14,804	35.67	+5.16
Liberal	Nancy Boyce	8,434	20.32	-9.55
Québec solidaire	Julie Dionne	1,887	4.55	+1.57
Option nationale	Steve Lemay	889	2.14	
Conservative	Benoit Lussier	479	1.15	

2008 Quebec general election
Party	Candidate	Votes	%	±%
Parti Québécois	Yves-François Blanchet	11,480	34.40	
Liberal	Jacques Sigouin	10,860	32.54	
Action démocratique	Sébastien Schneeberger	9,757	29.23	
Québec solidaire	Luce Daneau	1,279	3.83	
