= Estrie =

- Administrative region
- Coordinates: 45°29′N 71°40′W
- Country: Canada
- Province: Quebec
- Regional County Municipalities (RCM) and Equivalent Territories (ET): 8 RCM, 1 ET: Coaticook; Le Granit; Le Haut-Saint-François; Le Val-Saint-François; Les Sources; Memphrémagog; Brome-Missisquoi; La Haute-Yamaska; Sherbrooke (ET)

Government
  - Regional conference of elected officers: Jacques Demers (President)

Area
  - Land: 10,212.00 km^{2} (3,942.88 sq mi)

Population (2021)
  - Total: 337,701
  - Density: 31.2/km^{2} (81/sq mi)
- Demonym: Estrien(ne)
- Time zone: UTC-5 (EST)
  - Summer (DST): UTC-4 (EDT)
- Postal code: J
- Area code: 819, 873, 468
- Website: www.estrie.gouv.qc.ca

Estrie (French pronunciation: [ɛstʁi]) is an administrative region of Quebec that comprises the Eastern Townships. Estrie, a French neologism, was coined as a derivative of est, "east". Originally settled by anglophones, today it is about 90 per cent francophone. Anglophones are concentrated in Lennoxville, home of the region's only English-speaking university, Bishop's University. The English-language Eastern Townships School Board runs 20 elementary schools, three high schools, and a learning centre.

The region originally consisted of six regional county municipalities. In 2021, La Haute-Yamaska and Brome-Missisquoi regional counties were transferred from Montérégie to Estrie region.

== Economy ==
While the economy of the area is mainly based on agriculture, forestry, and mining, tourist attractions include four Sépaq parks: Yamaska, Mont-Orford, Frontenac, and Mont-Mégantic, ski resorts at Mont Brome and Mont Orford, and agritourism.

== Administrative divisions ==
=== Regional county municipalities ===
Regional County Municipality (RCM)	Population 2021 Canadian census	Land Area	Density (pop. per km^{2})	Seat of RCM
Brome-Missisquoi	64,786	1,651 km^{2} (637 sq mi)	34.3	Cowansville
Coaticook	18,906	1,339.80 km^{2} (517.30 sq mi)	13.8	Coaticook
La Haute-Yamaska	92,796	637 km^{2} (246 sq mi)	136.0	Granby
Le Granit	21,948	2,735.21 km^{2} (1,056.07 sq mi)	7.8	Lac-Mégantic
Le Haut-Saint-François	22,926	2,273.39 km^{2} (877.76 sq mi)	9.8	Cookshire-Eaton
Le Val-Saint-François	31,551	1,403.43 km^{2} (541.87 sq mi)	21.9	Richmond
Les Sources	14,623	787.13 km^{2} (303.91 sq mi)	18.1	Val-des-Sources
Memphrémagog	54,797	1,319.29 km^{2} (509.38 sq mi)	38.2	Magog

=== Equivalent territory ===
Territory Equivalent to a RCM (TE)	Population 2021 Canadian census	Land Area	Density (pop. per km^{2})	Seat of ET
Sherbrooke	172,950	367.10 km^{2} (141.74 sq mi)	456.0	Sherbrooke

=== Demographics ===
Largest cities or towns in Estrie 2021 census
Rank		Regional county municipality	Pop.	Rank		Regional county municipality	Pop.
1	Sherbrooke	Sherbrooke	172,950	11	Lac-Mégantic	Le Granit	5,747
2	Granby	La Haute-Yamaska	69,025	12	Cookshire-Eaton	Le Haut-Saint-François	5,344
3	Magog	Memphrémagog	28,312	13	Windsor	Le Val-Saint-François	5,294
4	Cowansville	Brome-Missisquoi	15,234	14	Orford	Memphrémagog	5,007
5	Bromont	Brome-Missisquoi	11,357	15	Waterloo	La Haute-Yamaska	4,920
6	Farnham	Brome-Missisquoi	10,149	16	Saint-Denis-de-Brompton	Le Val-Saint-François	4,594
7	Coaticook	Coaticook	8,867	17	Sutton	Brome-Missisquoi	4,548
8	Shefford	La Haute-Yamaska	7,253	18	Roxton Pond	La Haute-Yamaska	4,224
9	Val-des-Sources	Les Sources	7,088	19	Danville	Les Sources	3,888
10	Brome Lake	Brome-Missisquoi	5,923	20	East Angus	Le Haut-Saint-François	3,840

2021 Canadian Census First Official Language Spoken - Estrie
Census	French	English	French and English	Other
2021	304,620	23,565	4,485	1,345
2016	289,040	21,745	3,110	1,115
2011	281,305	22,070	2,720	825

Estrie has a population of 377,701 according to the 2021 Canadian Census. Out of 326,955 singular responses the most common out of them are as follows.

2021 Canadian Census Mother Tongue - Estrie
Rank	Language	Population	Percentage
1	French	291,685	89.2%
2	English	20,195	6.2%
3	Spanish	4,070	1.2%
4	Arabic	2,365	0.7%

2021 Canadian Census Knowledge of Official Languages - Estrie
Census	French Only	English Only	French and English	Neither French Nor English
2021	181,810	7,645	142,755	1,345
2016	179,590	6,685	127,565	1,170
2011	179,480	6,970	119,595	865

==== Cultural or ethnic origin ====
Estrie has a majority European population but it does have a diverse group of minorities. The most commonly described ethnic groups amongst the 328,025 responses are as follows

Rank	Ethnic/Cultural Identity	Population	Percentage
1	Canadian	120,150	36.6%
2	French	85,115	26%
3	Quebecois	42,855	13%
4	French Canadian	28,290	8.6%
5	English	9,185	3%
6	Scottish	8,045	2.5%
7	First Nations	7,270	2.2%

===== Religion =====
2021 Canadian Census Religious identity - Estrie
Rank	Religion	Population	Percentage
1	Catholicism	193,700	59%
2	No Religion	97,435	29.7%
3	Islam	6,575	2%
4	Anglicianism	2,555	0.7%
5	United Church of Canada	1,830	0.5%

== School districts ==
Francophone:

- Commission scolaire des Hauts-Cantons (Coaticook, East Angus and Lac-Mégantic).
- Commission scolaire de la Région-de-Sherbrooke
- Commission scolaire des Sommets
- Commission scolaire Val-des-cerfs

Anglophone:

- Eastern Townships School Board

== Major communities ==
- Bromont
- Coaticook
- Cookshire-Eaton
- Cowansville
- Farnham
- Granby
- Lac-Brome
- Lac-Mégantic
- Magog
- Orford
- Shefford
- Sherbrooke
- Val-des-Sources
- Windsor
