= Claude Boucher (politician) =

Canadian politician (1942–2025)

Claude Boucher (September 2, 1942 – December 5, 2025) was a Canadian politician in Quebec. He represented Johnson in the Quebec National Assembly from 1994 to 2007 as a member of the Parti Québécois.

== Life and career ==
Boucher was born in Bromptonville, Quebec (now Sherbrooke, Quebec), the son of Edgar A. Boucher and Yvette Lecours, and was educated at the Université de Sherbrooke. He was employed in the fields of health, education and social services and was manager at the CLSC in Sherbrooke. Boucher was mayor of Saint-Denis-de-Brompton and served as prefect for the Regional County Municipality of Val-Saint-François. He was defeated when he ran for reelection in the 2007 provincial election.

His son Étienne-Alexis served in the Quebec National Assembly from 2008-2012, as the member for Johnson.

Boucher died on December 5, 2025, at the age of 83.

== Sources ==
- "Biography". Dictionnaire des parlementaires du Québec de 1792 à nos jours (in French). National Assembly of Quebec.
