= Quebec Route 241 =

Highway in Quebec, Canada

Route 241

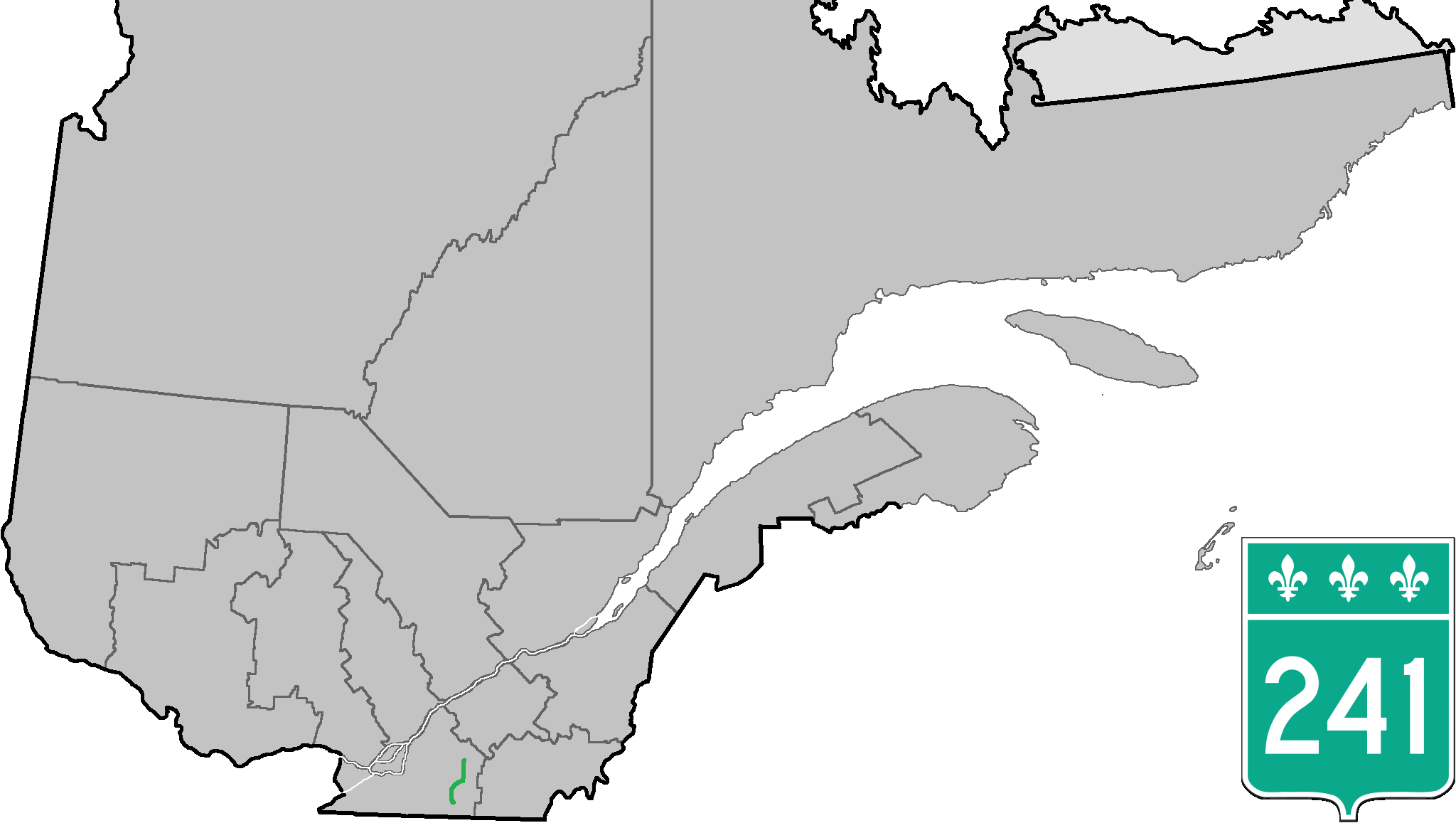

Route information
- Maintained by Transports Québec
- Length: 54.8 km (34.1 mi)

Major junctions
- South end: R-104 / R-139 in Cowansville
- R-112 in Waterloo; A-10 in Bromont
- North end: R-139 in Roxton Falls

Location
- Country: Canada
- Province: Quebec

Highway system
- Quebec provincial highways; Autoroutes; List; Former
← R-239	→ R-243

Route 241 is a north/south provincial highway on the south shore of the Saint Lawrence River in Quebec. Its northern terminus is in Roxton Falls at the junction of Route 139 and its southern terminus is close to Cowansville, at the junction of Route 139 once again. The highway overlaps both Route 112 and Route 243 in Waterloo located east of Granby and Bromont and just north of Autoroute 10.

== Municipalities along Route 241 ==
- Cowansville
- Bromont
- Waterloo
- Warden
- Saint-Joachim-de-Shefford
- Roxton Falls
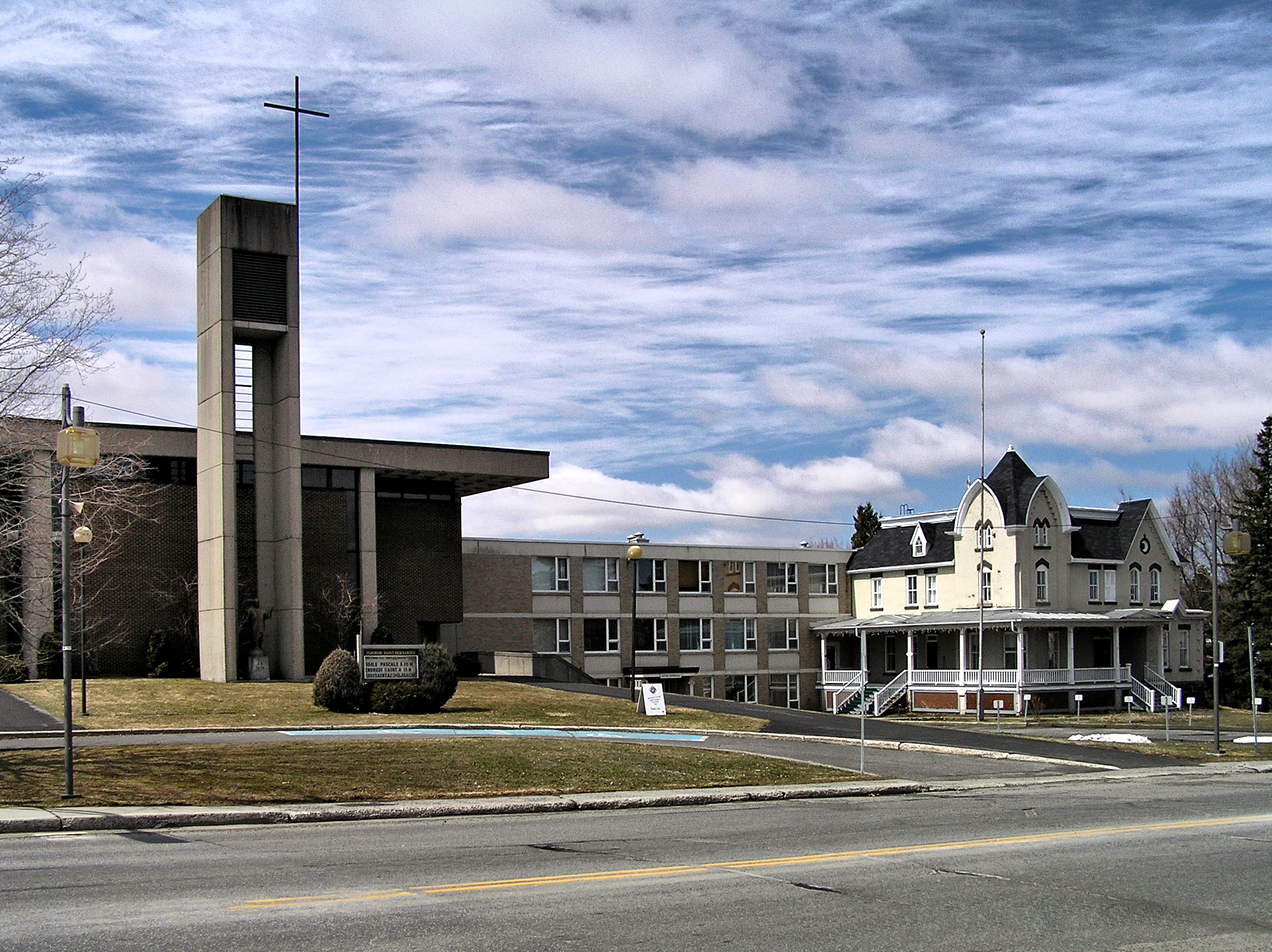
Routes 112, 241 and 243 meet in front of Saint-Bernardin church in Waterloo.

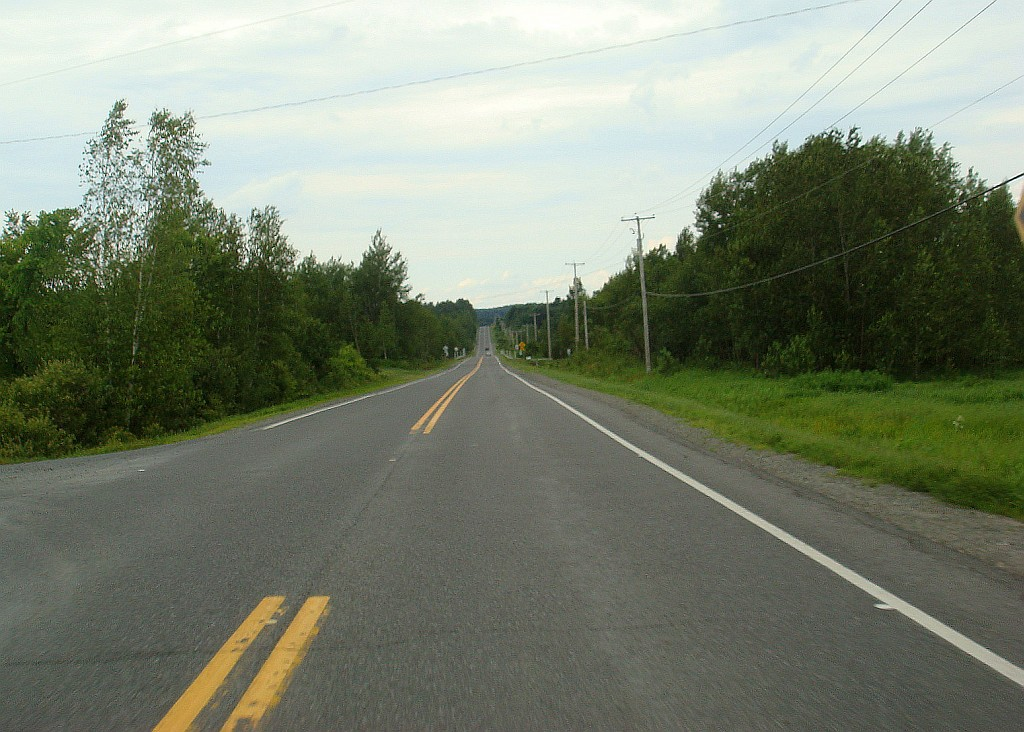
Route 241 in Saint-Joachim-de-Shefford.

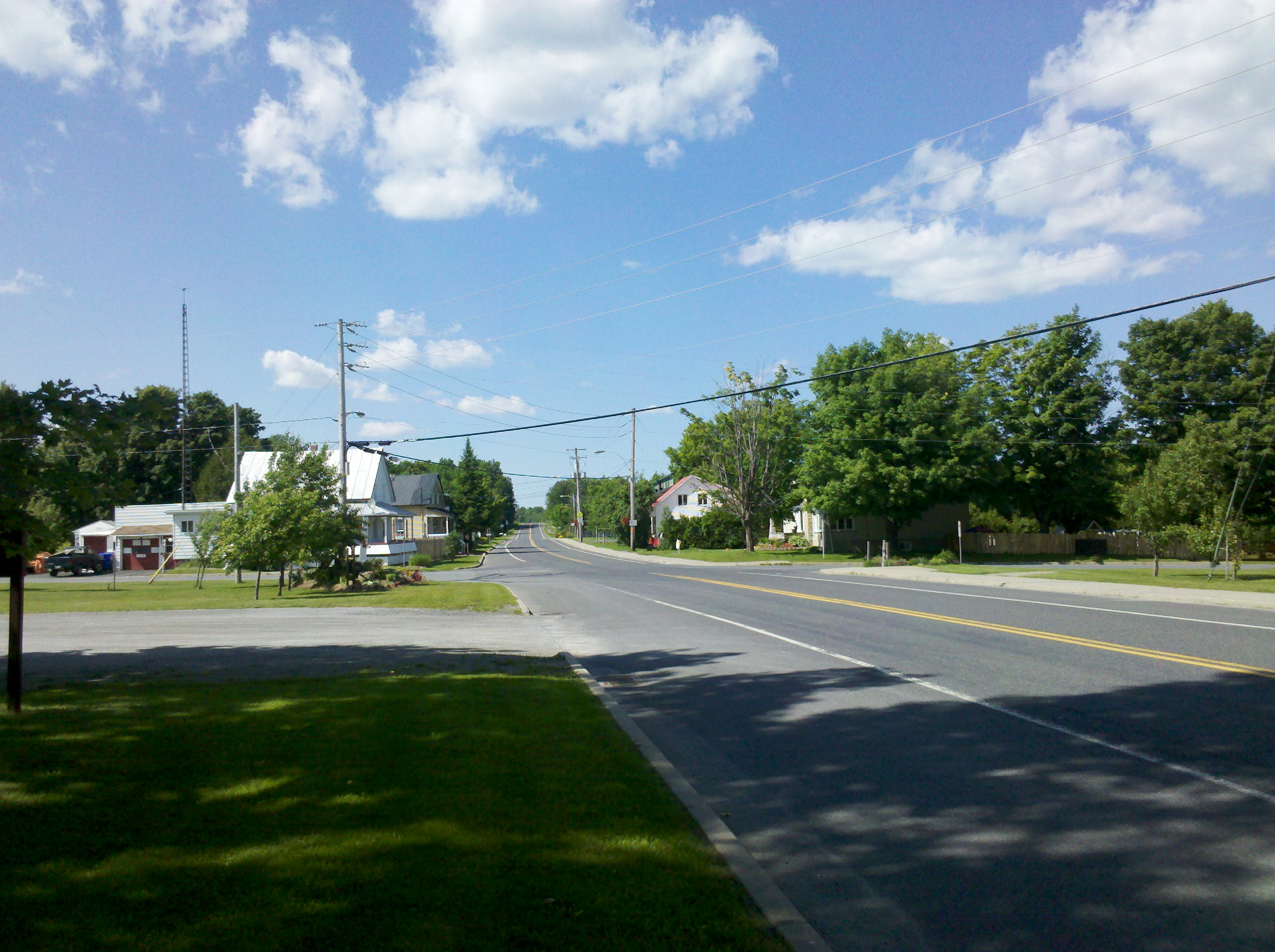
Principale street (main street) in Saint-Joachim.

== See also ==
- List of Quebec provincial highways
