= Quebec Route 243 =

Highway in Quebec, Canada

Route 243

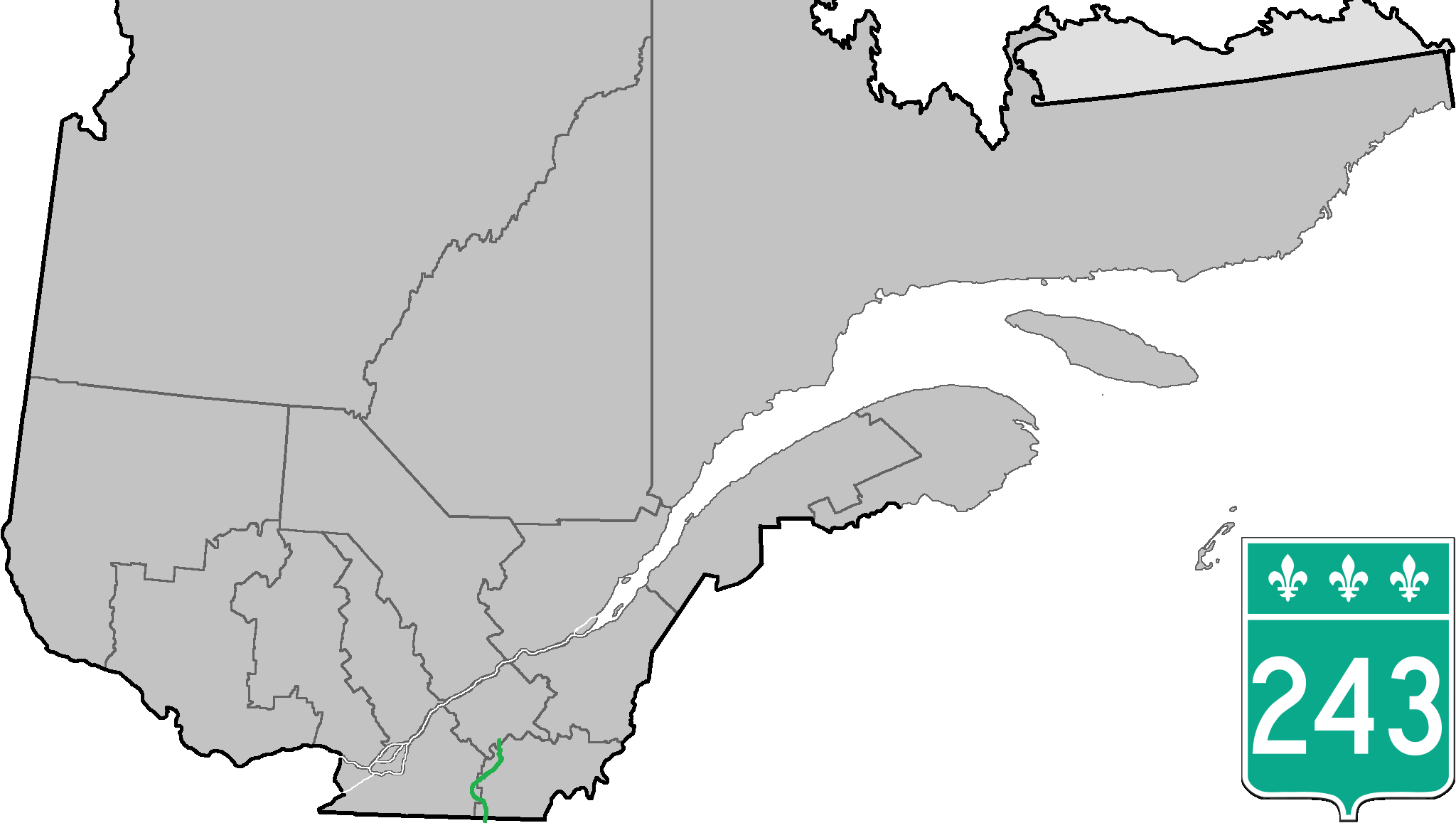

Route information
- Maintained by Transports Québec
- Length: 122.5 km (76.1 mi)

Major junctions
- South end: VT 243 at the U.S. border in Highwater
- R-116 / R-143 in Richmond; A-55 in Melbourne; R-112 in Waterloo; A-10 / R-104 in Brome Lake
- North end: R-255 in Saint-Félix-de-Kingsey

Location
- Country: Canada
- Province: Quebec

Highway system
- Quebec provincial highways; Autoroutes; List; Former
← R-241	→ R-245

Route 243 is a north/south highway on the south shore of the Saint Lawrence River. Its northern terminus is in Saint-Félix-de-Kingsey at the junction of Route 255 and its southern terminus is in the township of Potton where it crosses the Canada–US border at the North Troy–Highwater Border Crossing into Vermont and becomes Vermont Route 243. Route 243 is not a busy highway as it does not go through big towns.

The highway has three concurrencies:

- In Richmond, it shares a bridge across the Saint-François River with Route 116 and Route 143
- At Racine a 2 km concurrence with Route 222 occurs.
- In Waterloo it runs concurrently first with Route 112, then both it and Route 241 as all three share a bridge across the North Yamaska River

== Municipalities along Route 243 ==
- Saint-Félix-de-Kingsey
- Richmond
- Melbourne
- Racine
- Lawrenceville
- Sainte-Anne-de-la-Rochelle
- Warden
- Waterloo
- Brome Lake
- Bolton-Sud
- West Bolton
- Potton
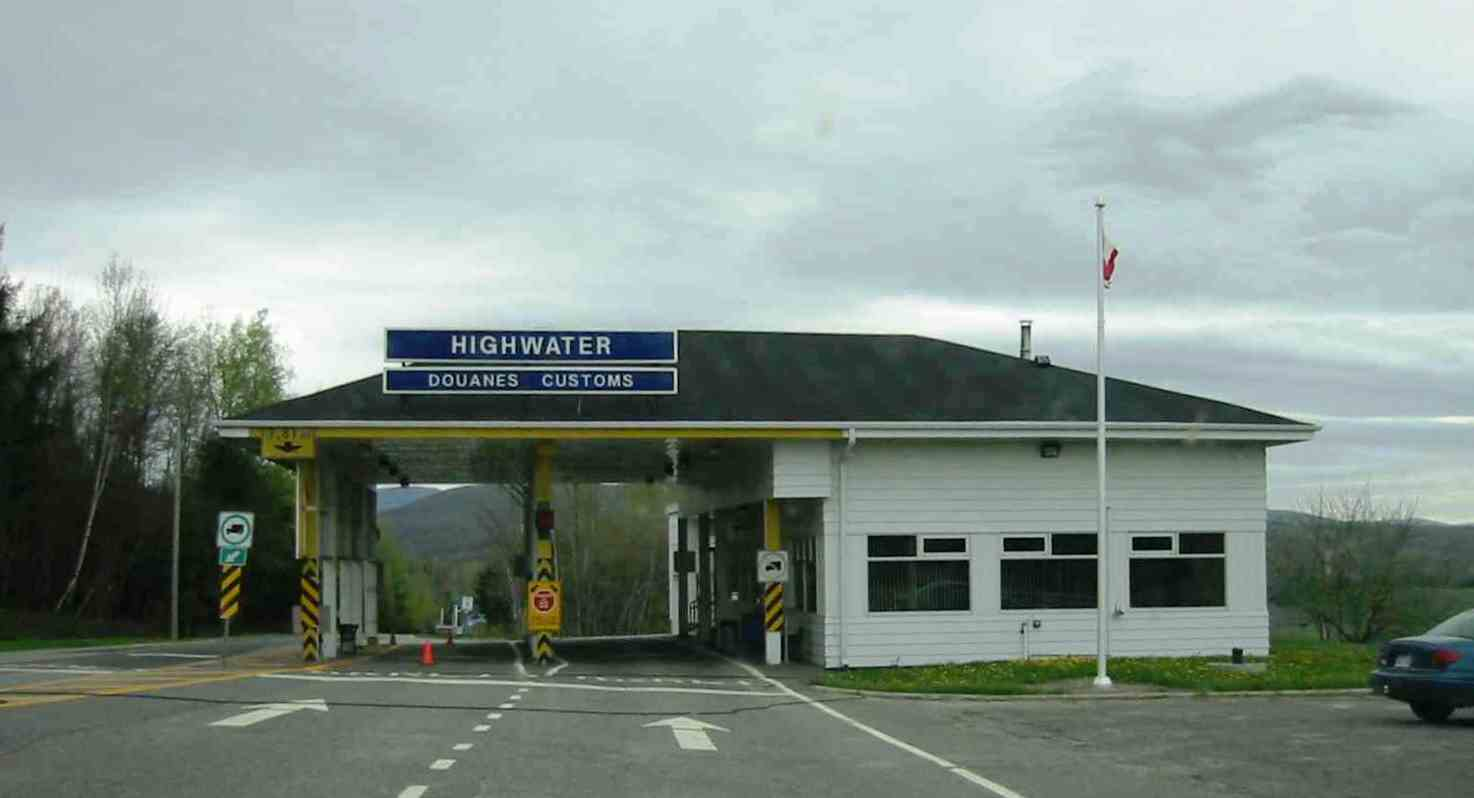
Route 243 southern end at Canada-US Border.

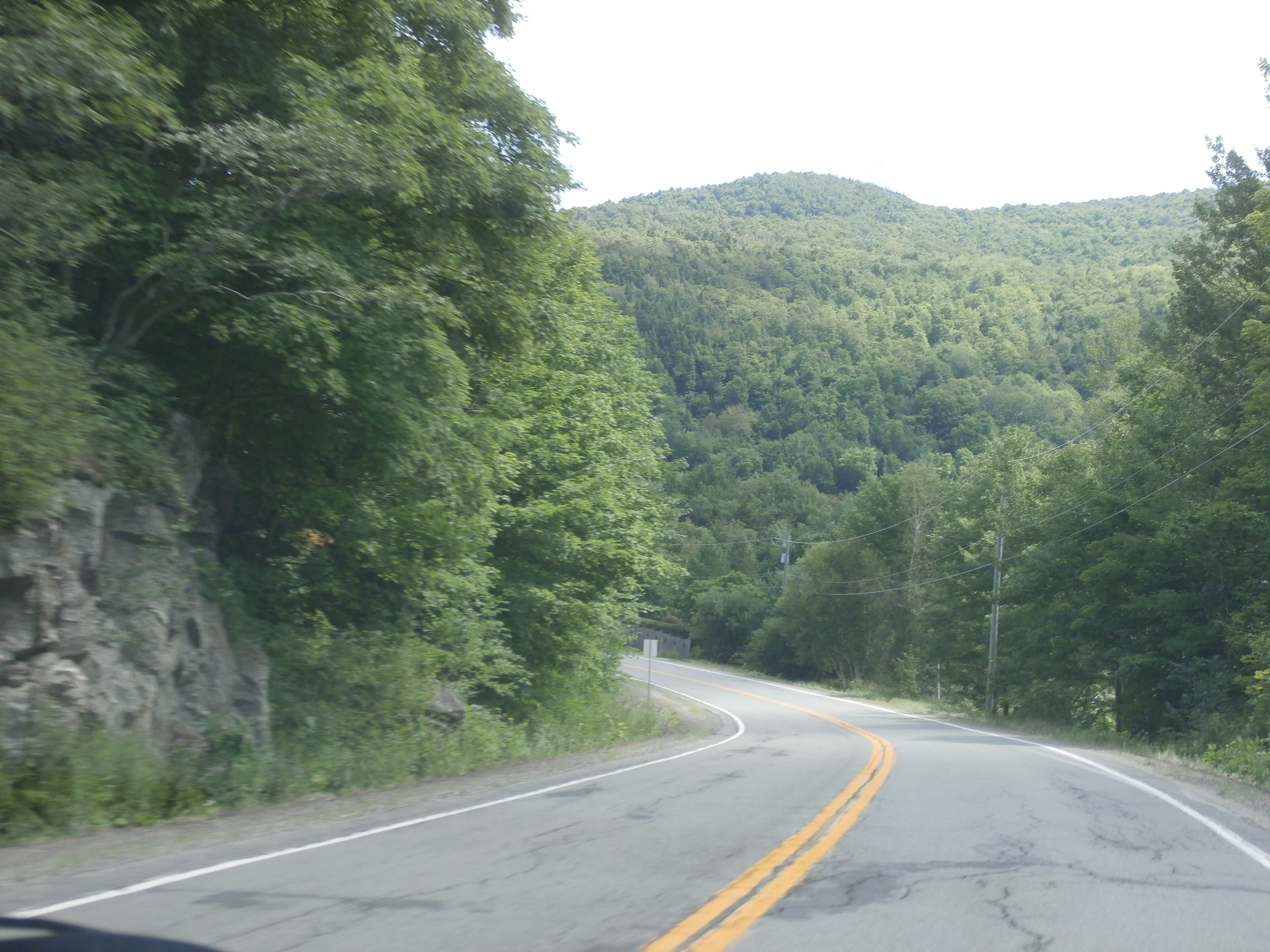
Route 243 at Bolton Pass.

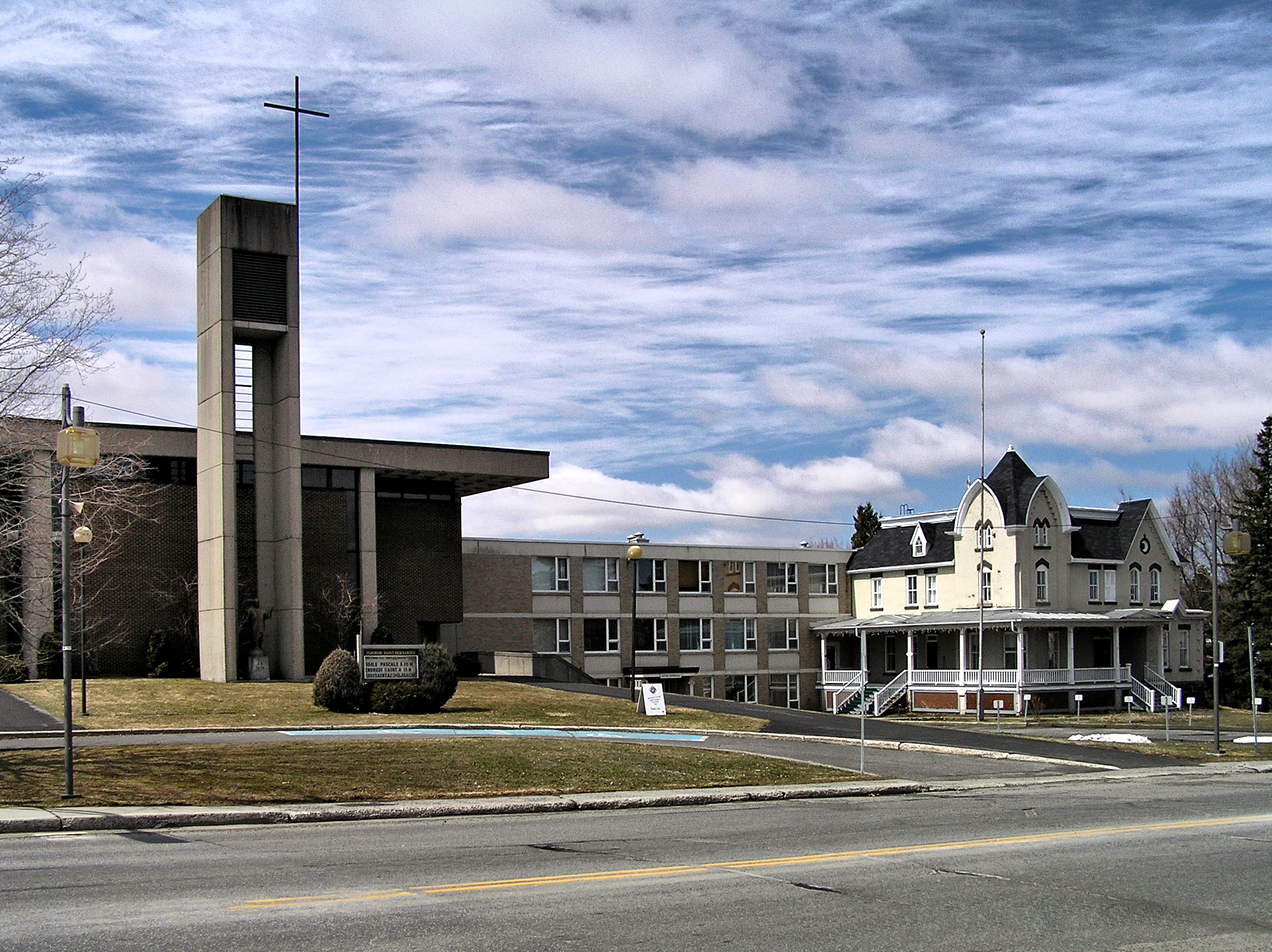
Routes 112, 241 and 243 meet before Saint-Bernardin church in Waterloo.

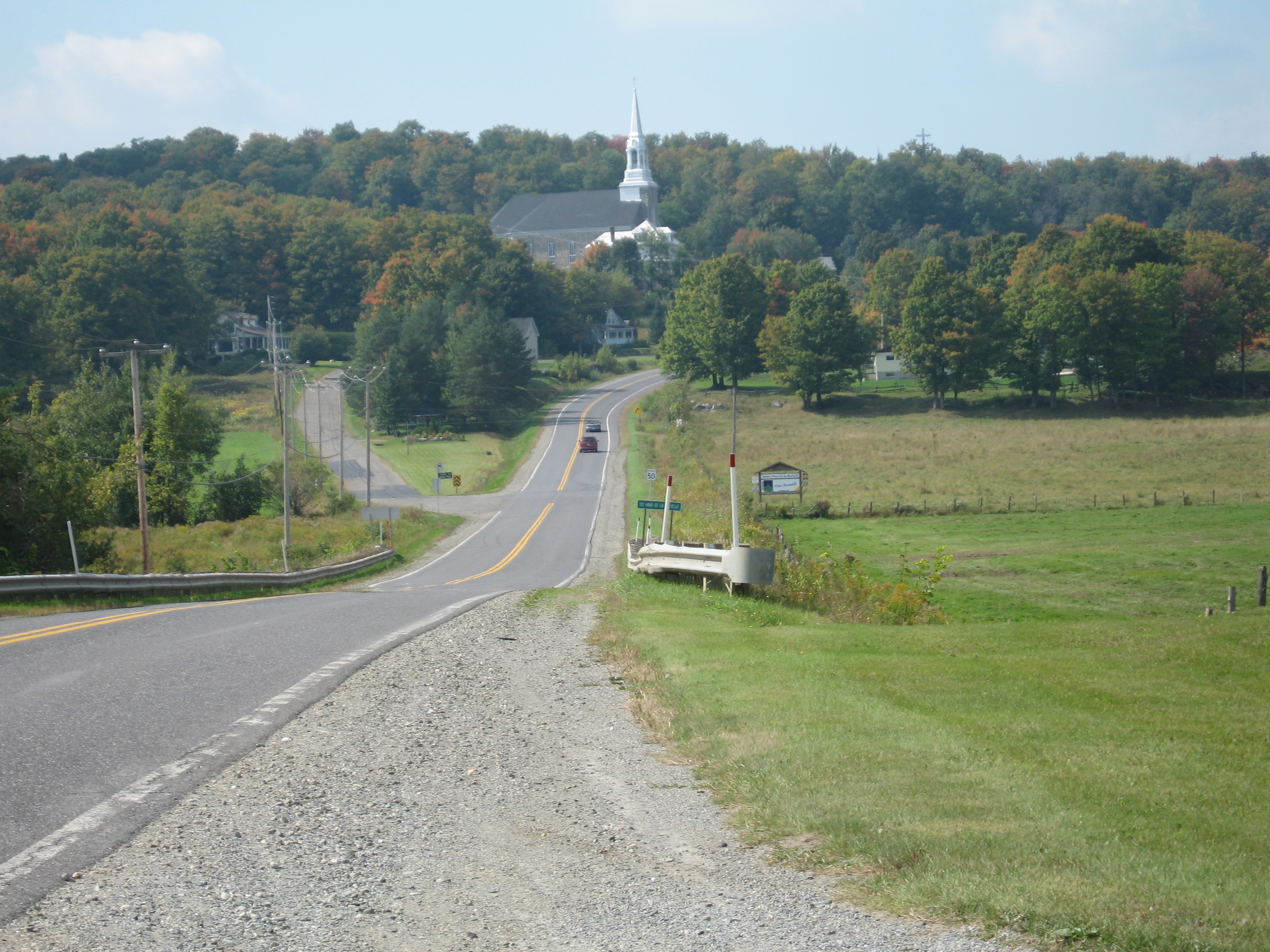
Entering Sainte-Anne-de-la-Rochelle.

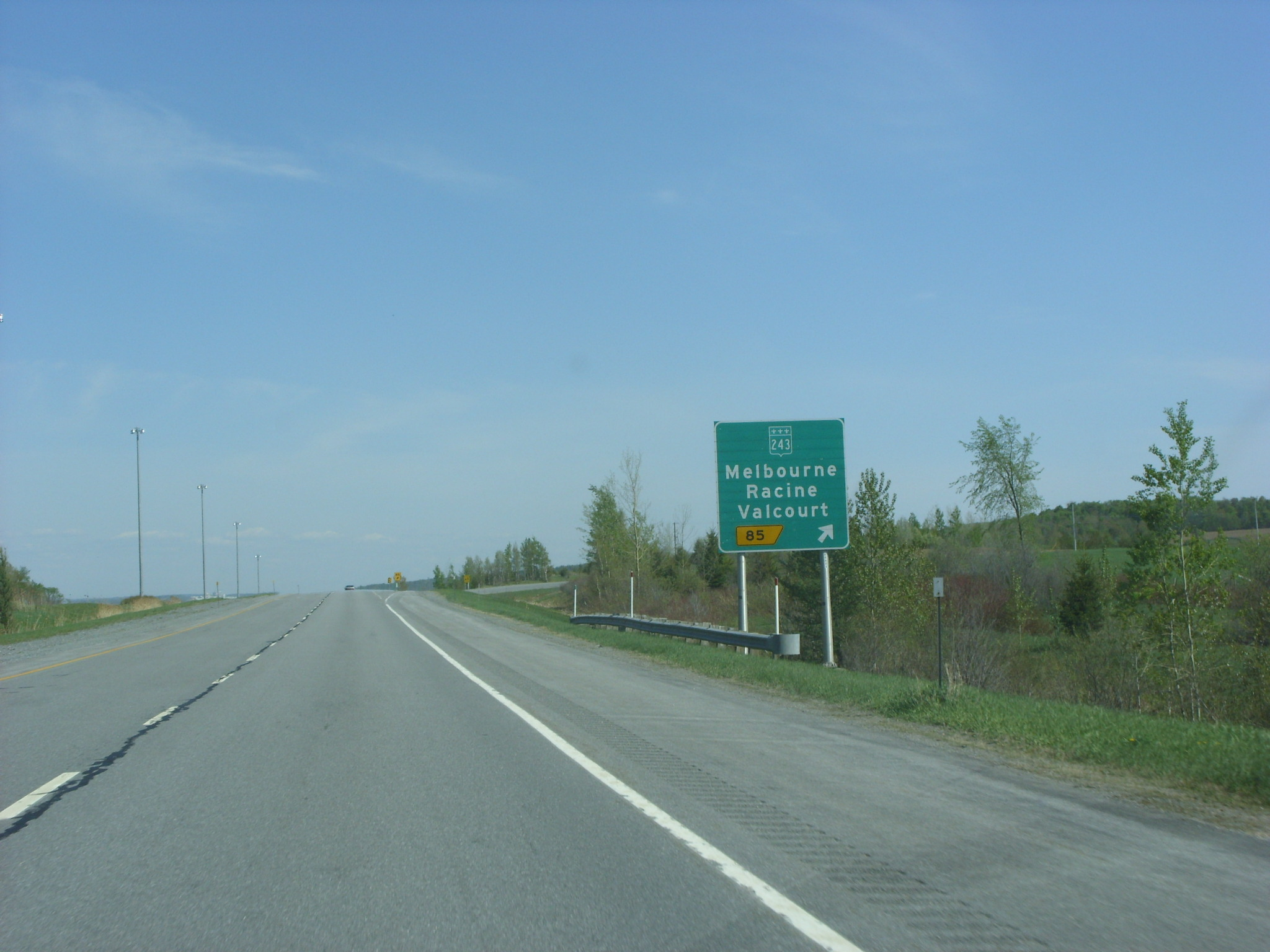
Approaching Autoroute 55 interchange with Route 243 in Melbourne.

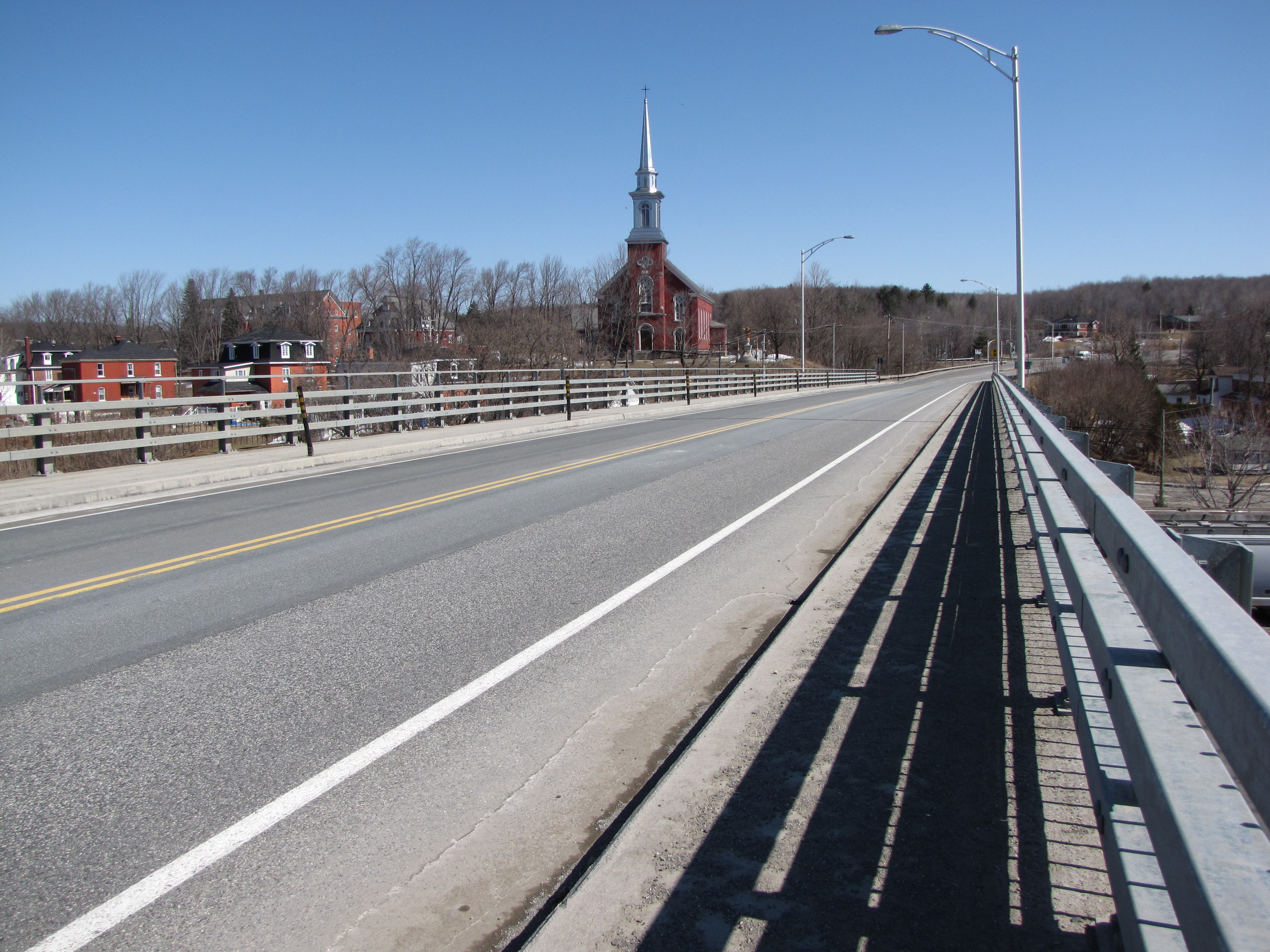
Route 243 shares its itinerary with Routes 116 and 143 on Frederick-Coburn Bridge in Richmond.

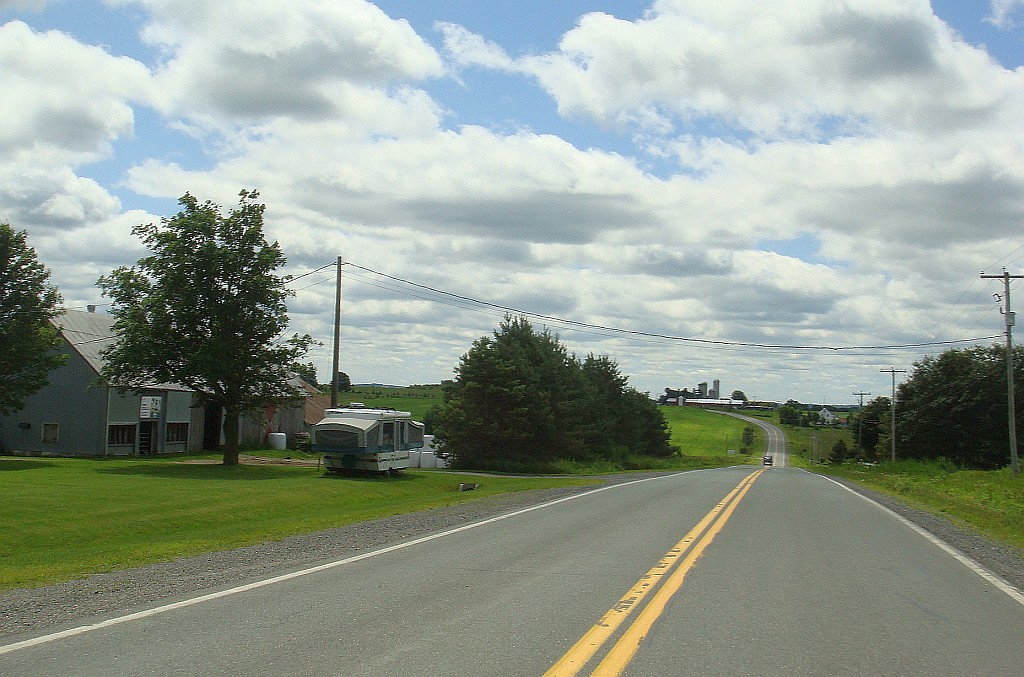
Quebec Route 243 in Saint-Félix-de-Kingsey.

== See also ==
- List of Quebec provincial highways
