= Noire River (Yamaska River tributary) =

River in Montérégie, Quebec (Canada)

Rivière Noire Rivière Pot au Beurre
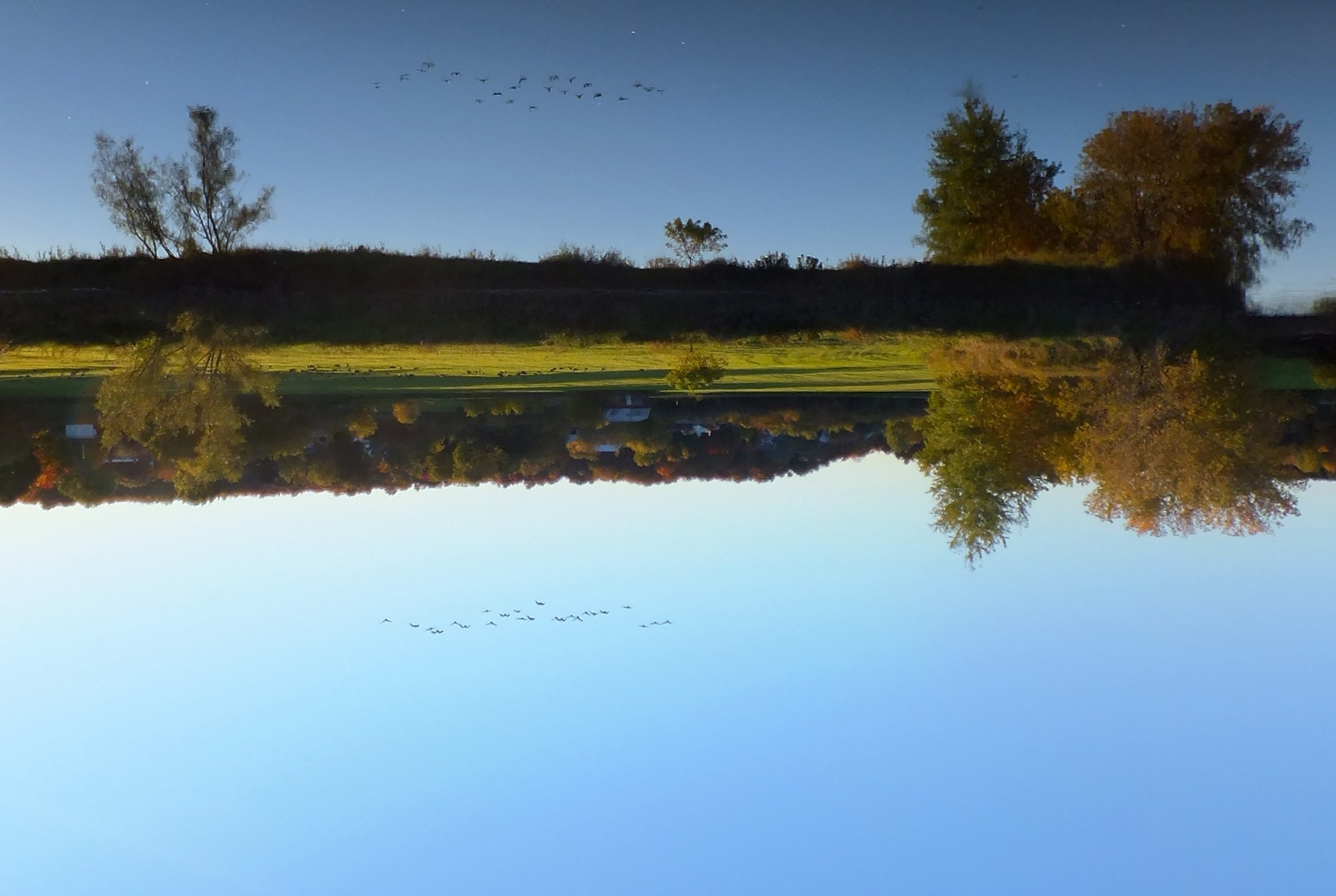
- Noire River at Roxton Falls

Location
- Country: Canada
- Province: Quebec
- Region: Estrie and Montérégie
- MRC: Memphrémagog Regional County Municipality, Le Val-Saint-François Regional County Municipality, Acton Regional County Municipality, Les Maskoutains Regional County Municipality, La Haute-Yamaska Regional County Municipality
- Municipality: Saint-Pie, Stukely-Sud

Physical characteristics
- Source: Mountain streams
  - location: Stukely-Sud
  - coordinates: 45°21′19″N 72°27′38″W
  - elevation: 262 m (860 ft)
- Mouth: Yamaska River
  - location: Saint-Pie
  - coordinates: 45°32′46″N 72°57′45″W
  - elevation: 26 m (85 ft)
- Length: 104.6 km (65.0 mi)

Basin features
- Tributaries
  - left: (upstream) ruisseaux: Monast, décharge du Cordon, Gazaille, du Village, des Castors, Guilmain-Phaneuf, Filiatreault, Gaudet, Arthur-Tétreault, Runnels, Laliberté, Viens, Castagne, Beauregard, Robichaud, Duhamel.
  - right: (upstream) ruisseaux: des Allonges, décharge des Douze, Lavoie, Ménard, petit ruisseau Saint-François, des Glaises, Paul, Frégault, rivière le Renne, Despault, Blanchard, Wilfrid-Coutu, Gilbert-Champagne, Roireau, Cyr, Jaune River (Noire River tributary), Lambert, Bisonnette, Bombardier, Benda, Rouge River (Noire River tributary).

The Noire River (French: rivière Noire, in English: Black River) is the most important tributary of the Yamaska River. The Black River flows on the South Shore of the Saint Lawrence River, in Quebec, Canada, passing through the municipalities of:

MRC Memphrémagog Regional County Municipality in the administrative region of Estrie:

- Stukely-Sud,

MRC Le Val-Saint-François Regional County Municipality in the administrative region of Estrie:

- Sainte-Anne-de-la-Rochelle,
- Lawrenceville,
- Valcourt,
- Maricourt,

MRC of Acton Regional County Municipality in the administrative region of Montérégie

- Sainte-Christine
- Roxton
- Roxton Falls
- Acton Vale
- Saint-Théodore-d'Acton
- Upton

MRC Les Maskoutains Regional County Municipality in the administrative region of Montérégie

- Saint-Valérien-de-Milton
- Saint-Pie

MRC of La Haute-Yamaska Regional County Municipality in the administrative region of Montérégie

- Sainte-Cécile-de-Milton

== Geography ==
The main neighboring hydrographic slopes of the Black River are:

- north side: David River, Saint-Germain River, Chibouet River;
- east side: Rivière le Renne, Saint-François River, Jaune River (Noire River tributary), Rouge River (Noire River tributary);
- south side: North Yamaska River;
- west side: Yamaska River.

The Black River begins in an area northeast of Waterloo Lake in the Municipality of Stukely-Sud.

Upper course of the river (segment of 22.5 kilometres (14.0 mi))

From a very small head lake located in Stukely-Sud, the Rivière Noire flows over:

- 7.0 kilometres (4.3 mi) towards the northeast, crossing two zones of marshes (segments of 1.6 kilometres (0.99 mi) and 1.4 kilometres (0.87 mi)), to the bridge of the route 243 west of the village of Sainte-Anne-de-la-Rochelle;
- 7.8 kilometres (4.8 mi) to the Rouge River (coming from the southeast) whose mouth is located northwest of the village of Lawrenceville;
- 7.7 kilometres (4.8 mi) northeasterly to route 222, west of the village of Valcourt;

Course of the river downstream of Valcourt (segment of 24.6 kilometres (15.3 mi))

From route 222, passing through the village of Valcourt, the Rivière Noire flows over:

- 3.9 kilometres (2.4 mi) north to the Bombardier stream (coming from the east);
- 3.4 kilometres (2.1 mi) south-west to the Rang 7e bridge;
- 4.3 kilometres (2.7 mi) southwesterly to Beauregard brook (coming from the south);
- 10.9 kilometres (6.8 mi) north-west to Savoie stream (coming from the south);
- 2.1 kilometres (1.3 mi) north to Roxton Falls located in the village of Roxton Falls.

Course of the river downstream of Roxton Falls (segment of 27.1 kilometres (16.8 mi))

From Roxton Falls, the river flows over:

- 4.9 kilometres (3.0 mi) north-west to the rang 1e bridge;
- 3.7 kilometres (2.3 mi) north-west to the Île aux Pins Rapide;
- 4.9 kilometres (3.0 mi) towards the south-west, passing in front of "Place-Lavallée", to the Runnels stream (coming from the south);
- 7.4 kilometres (4.6 mi) towards the north-west, passing south of the village of Acton Vale, to the mouth of the rivière le Renne (coming from the north- East);
- 1.1 kilometres (0.68 mi) southwesterly to route 116 which passes through the southern part of the village of Upton;
- 5.1 kilometres (3.2 mi) south-west to the Père-Tarte dam.

Course of the river downstream of the Père-Tarte dam (segment of 30.4 kilometres (18.9 mi))

From the Père-Tarte dam, the Rivière Noire flows over:

- 5.4 kilometres (3.4 mi) southwesterly to the road bridge on Chemin Saint-Dominique in Saint-Valérien-de-Milton;
- 3.1 kilometres (1.9 mi) south-west to the Rang de l'Égypte bridge;
- 3.1 kilometres (1.9 mi) southwest to the route 137 bridge;
- 4.7 kilometres (2.9 mi) south-west to the third rang West bridge;
- 6.0 kilometres (3.7 mi) westward, passing north of Mont Yamaska, to the Émileville dam, near the hamlet of Émileville;
- 1.1 kilometres (0.68 mi) north-west to the route 235 bridge in the village of Saint-Pie;
- 7.0 kilometres (4.3 mi) north-west to the mouth.

The Black River empties at the "Pointe aux Fourches" on the east bank of the Yamaska River at Saint-Pie. The mouth is located 6.7 kilometres (4.2 mi) upstream of the Douville Bridge, located southwest of Saint-Hyacinthe.

== Toponymy ==
The traditional Aboriginal toponymic variant is "Mkazawitekw River".

The toponym “Rivière Noire” was officially registered on December 5, 1968, at the Commission de toponymie du Québec.

== See also ==
- List of rivers of Quebec
