= Rouge River (Noire River tributary) =

River in Estrie, Quebec, Canada

- Location within Quebec
- Native name: Rivière Rouge (French)

Location
- Country: Canada
- Province: Quebec
- Administrative region: Estrie
- MRC: Le Val-Saint-François Regional County Municipality
- Municipality: Bonsecours and Lawrenceville

Physical characteristics
- Source: Confluence of two mountain streams
  - location: Bonsecours
  - coordinates: 45.420539°N 72.245474°W
  - elevation: 358
- Mouth: Noire River
  - location: Bonsecours
  - coordinates: 45.43639°N 72.35833°W
  - elevation: 197 m
- Length: 16.0 km (9.9 mi)

Basin features
- River system: Saint Lawrence River

The Rouge River (in French: Rivière Rouge) is a tributary of the Noire River (Yamaska River tributary). It flows in the municipalities of Bonsecours and Lawrenceville, in the Le Val-Saint-François Regional County Municipality (MRC), on the South Shore of the Saint Lawrence River, in the administrative region of Estrie, in Quebec, Canada.

== Geography ==
The main neighboring hydrographic slopes of the Red River are:

- north side: Noire River (Yamaska River tributary), brook Brenda;
- east side: Bowker lake, rivière aux Herbages;
- south side: Noire River (Yamaska River tributary);
- west side: Noire River (Yamaska River tributary).

The Red River begins at the confluence of two mountain streams located northwest of the village of Bonsecours, west of Bowker lake, southwest of Mont Florence-Louise-Bradford and north of route 220.

The course of the Red River descends on:

- 3.2 kilometres (2.0 mi) southwesterly to route 220 which it crosses at 2.3 kilometres (1.4 mi) east of center of the village of Bonsecours;
- 1.7 kilometres (1.1 mi) southwest to a stream (coming from the village of Bonsecours);
- 5.3 kilometres (3.3 mi) north-west, passing south of the village of Bonsecours, to route 220 which the crossing at 1.9 kilometres (1.2 mi) west of the center of the village of Bonsecours;
- 2.9 kilometres (1.8 mi) north-west to the route 243 bridge which passes through the village of Lawrenceville
- 2.9 kilometres (1.8 mi) towards the north-west, to its mouth.

The Red River empties on the east bank of the Noire River in the territory of the municipality of Lawrenceville, at 1.9 kilometres (1.2 mi) north-west of the center of this village and 4.4 kilometres (2.7 mi) north-east of the center of the village of Sainte-Anne-de-la-Rochelle.

== Toponymy ==
The toponym "Rivière Rouge" was officially registered on March 19, 1979, at the Commission de toponymie du Québec.

== See also ==
- List of rivers of Quebec
