= Stukely-Sud =

Stukely-Sud, Canada
- Village municipality
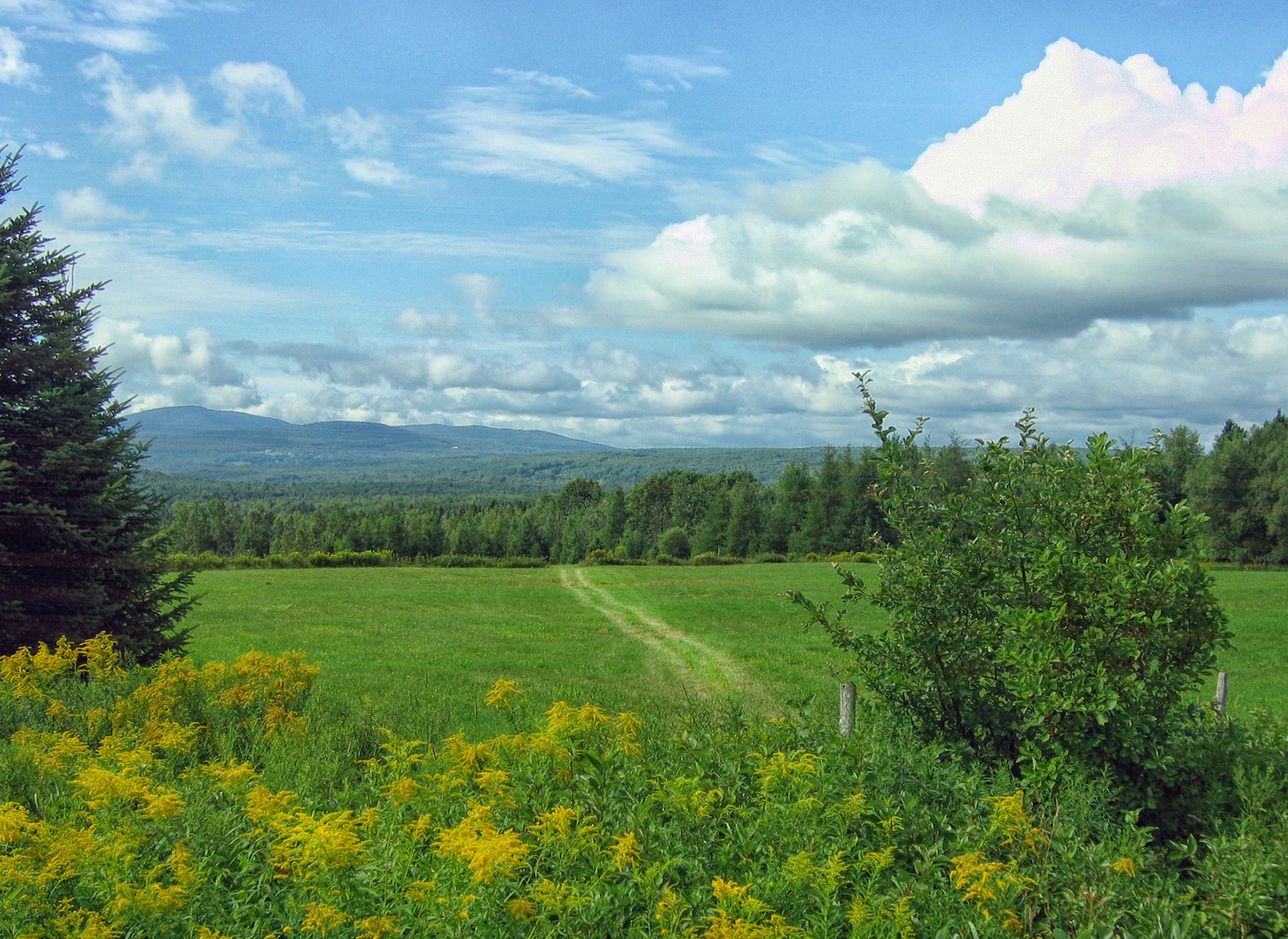

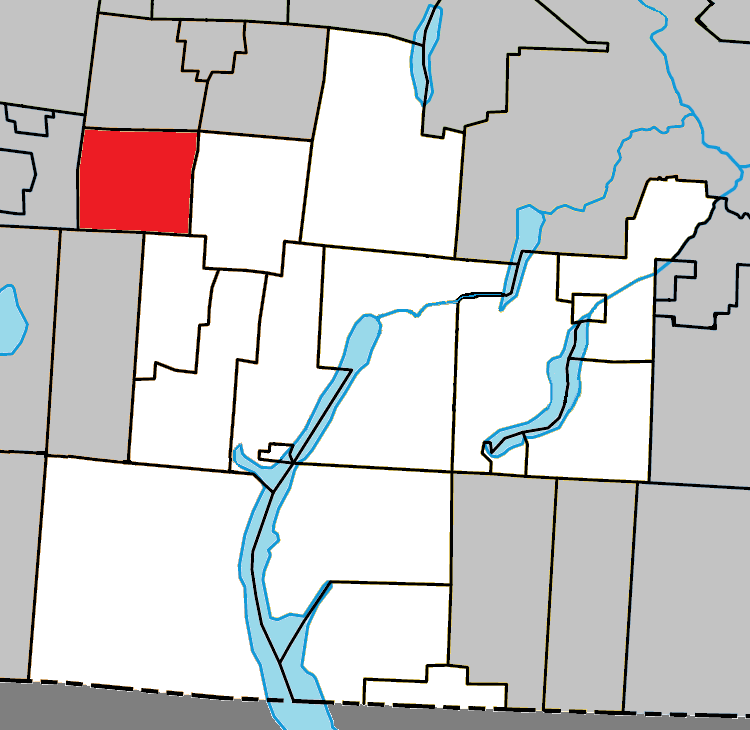
- Location within Memphrémagog RCM

- Location in southern Quebec
- Coordinates: 45°19′16″N 72°25′05″W
- Country: Canada
- Province: Quebec
- Region: Estrie
- RCM: Memphrémagog
- Constituted: September 14, 1935

Government
  - Mayor: Patrick Leblond
  - Federal riding: Brome—Missisquoi
  - Prov. riding: Orford

Area
  - Total: 63.80 km^{2} (24.63 sq mi)
  - Land: 63.24 km^{2} (24.42 sq mi)

Population (2016)
  - Total: 1,058
  - Density: 15.8/km^{2} (41/sq mi)
  - Pop 2006-2011: ▲6.2%
  - Dwellings: 522
- Time zone: UTC−5 (EST)
  - Summer (DST): UTC−4 (EDT)
- Postal code(s): J0E 2J0
- Area codes: 450 and 579
- Highways: R-112
- Website: stukely-sud.com

Stukely-Sud is a village of 950 people, part of the Memphrémagog Regional County Municipality in the Estrie region of Quebec, Canada.

== History ==
Stukely-Sud was originally created on June 3, 1847, when the township municipality of Stukely was spitted in two different municipalities: South Stukely and North Stukely. North Stukely would eventually disband in three other municipalities (Lawrenceville, Bonsecours and Sainte-Anne-de-la-Rochelle). On the other hand, South Stukely will continue on until 1935 when the urban part of the municipality will split off to form the new village municipality of Stukely-Sud which still stand today.

Meanwhile, the rural section would also change to the French name Stukely-Sud in 1969. In 1993, it will change to only Stukely and would eventually be merged into Eastman in 2001.

== Demographics ==
In the 2021 Census of Population conducted by Statistics Canada, Stukely-Sud had a population of 1,142 living in 510 of its 599 total private dwellings, a change of 7.9% from its 2016 population of 1,058. With a land area of 63.19 km^{2} (24.40 sq mi), it had a population density of 18.1/km^{2} (46.8/sq mi) in 2021.

Population trend:

Census	Population	Change (%)
2011	999	▲6.2%
2006	941	▼2.5%
2001	965	▲9.5%
1996	882	▲17.0%
1991	754	N/A

Mother tongue (2011)

Language	Population	Pct (%)
French only	830	83.4%
English only	140	14.1%
Both English and French	10	1.0%
Non-official languages	15	1.5%

== See also ==
- List of anglophone communities in Quebec
- List of village municipalities in Quebec
