= Jaune River =

Jaune River (French for Yellow River) may refer to:

- Jaune River (Saint-Charles River), tributary of the Saint-Charles River, Quebec, Canada
- Jaune River (Noire River), tributary of the Noire River, in Acton Regional County Municipality, Montérégie, Quebec, Canada
- Hart Jaune River, watercourse of Rivière-Mouchalagane, Caniapiscau, Côte-Nord, Quebec, Canada
