= L'Ange-Gardien, Quebec =

L'Ange-Gardien or Ange-Gardien may refer to:

- L'Ange-Gardien, Outaouais, Quebec, in Les Collines-de-l'Outaouais Regional County Municipality
- L'Ange-Gardien, Capitale-Nationale, Quebec, in La Côte-de-Beaupré Regional County Municipality
- Ange-Gardien, Quebec, in Rouville Regional County Municipality in Montérégie
  - The former L'Ange-Gardien in Montérégie which amalgamated into Ange-Gardien in 1997

== See also ==
- L'Ange-Gardien, Ontario
