= Hébertville-Station, Quebec =

Hébertville-Station
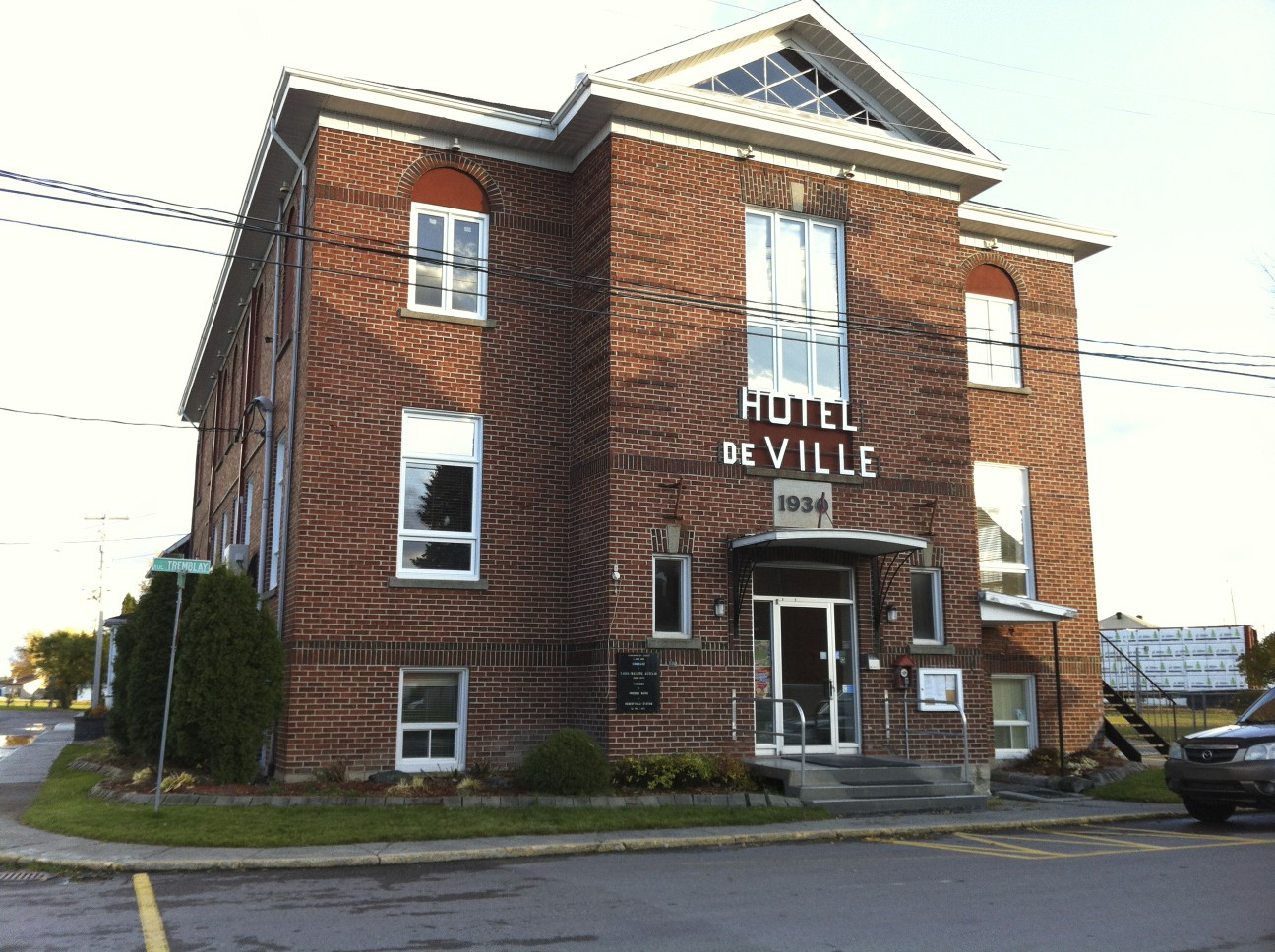

- Location in Saguenay–Lac-Saint-Jean Quebec.
- Coordinates: 48°44′N 71°40′W
- Country: Canada
- Province: Quebec
- Region: Saguenay–Lac-Saint-Jean
- RCM: Lac-Saint-Jean-Est
- Constituted: February 18, 1903
- Named for: Nicolas-Tolentin Hébert

Government
  - Federal riding: Jonquière
  - Prov. riding: Lac-Saint-Jean

Area
  - Total: 32.70 km^{2} (12.63 sq mi)
  - Land: 31.71 km^{2} (12.24 sq mi)

Population (2011)
  - Total: 1,216
  - Density: 38.3/km^{2} (99/sq mi)
  - Pop 2006-2011: ▼1.1%
  - Dwellings: 518
- Time zone: UTC−5 (EST)
  - Summer (DST): UTC−4 (EDT)
- Postal code(s): G0W 1T0
- Area codes: 418 and 581
- Highways: R-169
- Census profile: 2493025
- MAMROT info: 93025
- Toponymie info: 28326
- Climate: Dfb

Hébertville-Station (French pronunciation: [ebɛʁvil stasjɔ̃]) is a former municipality in Lac-Saint-Jean-Est Regional County Municipality in the Saguenay–Lac-Saint-Jean region of Quebec. in 2026, it was merged with Hébertville

== Demographics ==
In the 2021 Census of Population conducted by Statistics Canada, Hébertville-Station had a population of 1,229 living in 546 of its 558 total private dwellings, a change of −6.3% from its 2016 population of 1,311. With a land area of 31.5 km^{2} (12.2 sq mi), it had a population density of 39.0/km^{2} (101.1/sq mi) in 2021.

== See also ==
- List of village municipalities in Quebec
