= Saint-Pierre, Quebec =

Saint-Pierre
- Village municipality
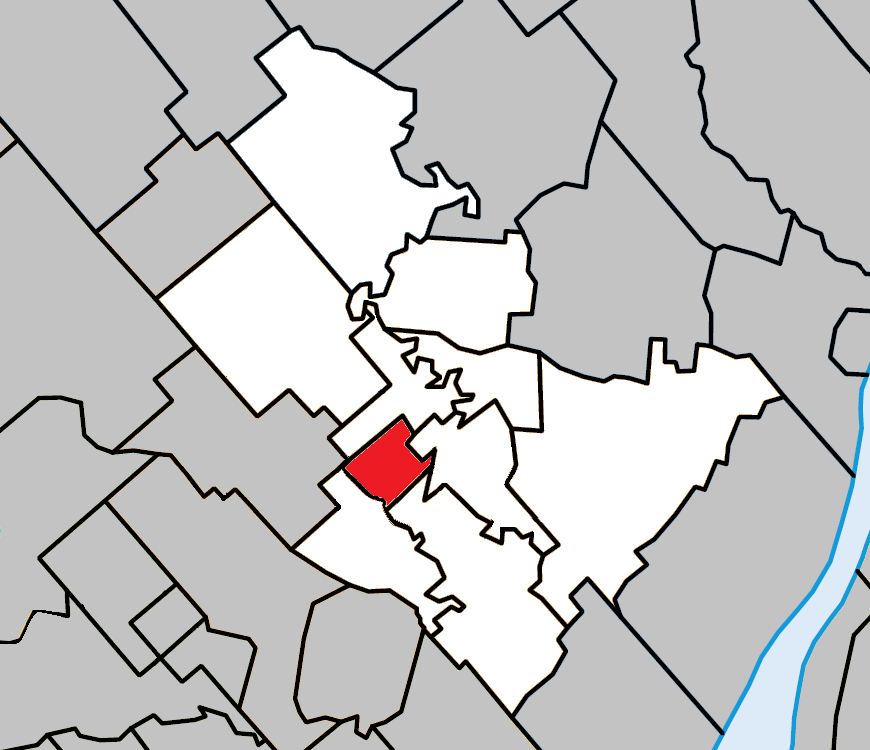
- Location within Joliette RCM.

- Location in central Quebec.
- Coordinates: 46°01′N 73°28′W
- Country: Canada
- Province: Quebec
- Region: Lanaudière
- RCM: Joliette
- Constituted: April 24, 1922
- Named for: Saint Peter

Government
  - Mayor: Roland Charest
  - Federal riding: Joliette
  - Prov. riding: Joliette

Area
  - Total: 10.10 km^{2} (3.90 sq mi)
  - Land: 9.68 km^{2} (3.74 sq mi)

Population (2021)
  - Total: 286
  - Density: 29.5/km^{2} (76/sq mi)
  - Pop 2016-2021: ▲3.6%
  - Dwellings: 132
- Time zone: UTC−5 (EST)
  - Summer (DST): UTC−4 (EDT)
- Postal code(s): J6E 0H2
- Area codes: 450 and 579
- Highways: R-343

Saint-Pierre (Canadian French pronunciation: [sẽ pjaɛ̯ʁ]) is a village municipality in Joliette Regional County Municipality in the Lanaudière region of Quebec, Canada.

== Demographics ==
In the 2021 Census of Population conducted by Statistics Canada, Saint-Pierre had a population of 286 living in 129 of its 132 total private dwellings, a change of 3.6% from its 2016 population of 276. With a land area of 9.68 km^{2} (3.74 sq mi), it had a population density of 29.5/km^{2} (76.5/sq mi) in 2021.

Population:

- Population in 2021: 286 (2016 to 2021 population change: 3.6%)
- Population in 2016: 276 (2011 to 2016 population change: -9.5%)
- Population in 2011: 305 (2006 to 2011 population change: 0.3%)
- Population in 2006: 304
- Population in 2001: 293
- Population in 1996: 357
- Population in 1991: 358
- Population in 1986: 386
- Population in 1981: 366
- Population in 1976: 341
- Population in 1971: 357
- Population in 1966: 354
- Population in 1961: 364
- Population in 1956: 350
- Population in 1951: 301
- Population in 1941: 311
- Population in 1931: 272

Mother tongue:

- English as first language: 1.8%
- French as first language: 94.7%
- English and French as first language: 0%
- Other as first language: 3.5%

== Education ==
The Sir Wilfrid Laurier School Board operates anglophone public schools, including:

- Joliette Elementary School in Saint-Charles-Borromée
- Joliette High School in Joliette

== See also ==
- List of village municipalities in Quebec
