= Area codes 450, 579, and 354 =

Telephone area codes for the suburbs of Montreal

Coordinates: 45.61°N 73.94°W

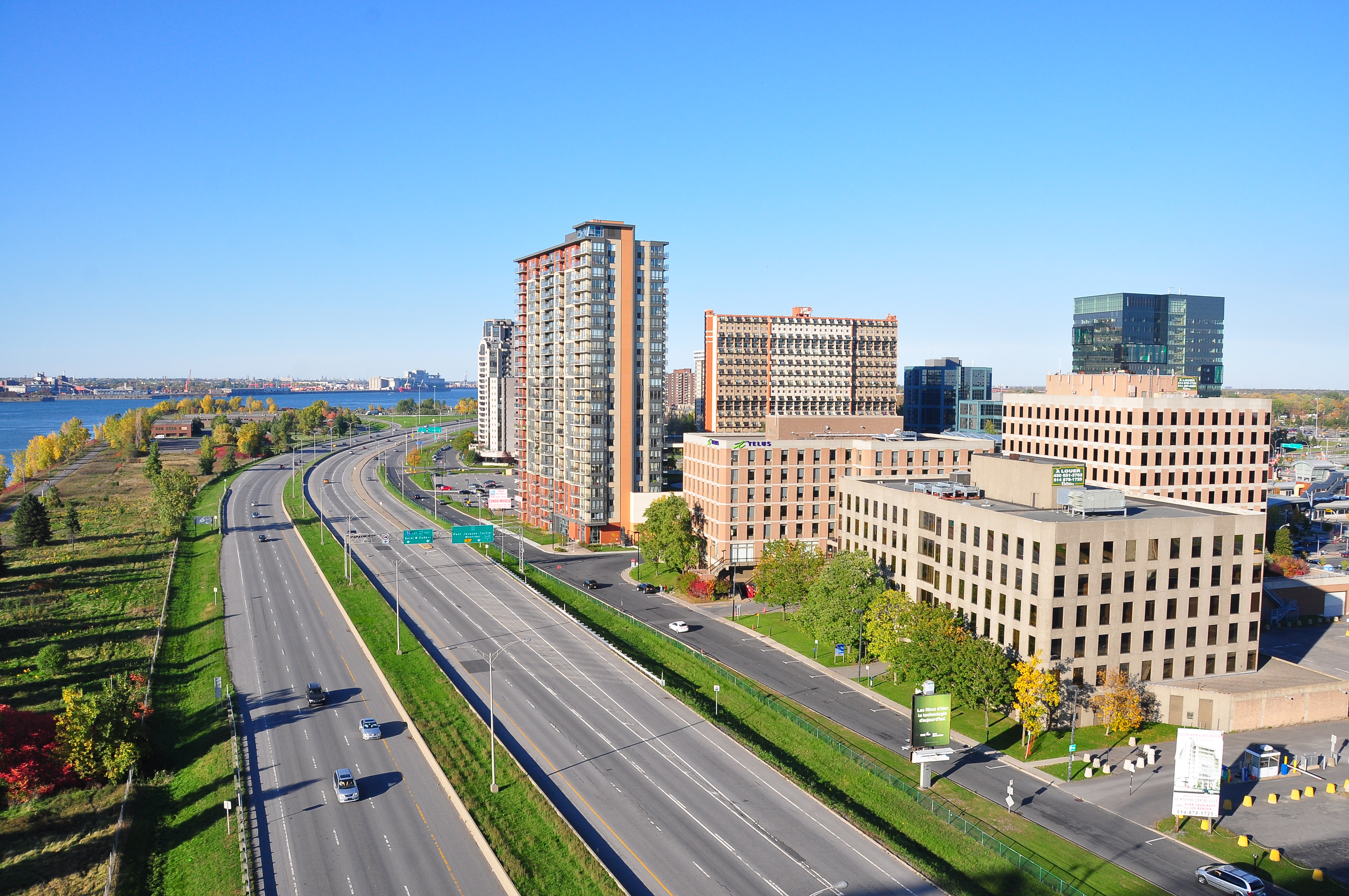
Longueuil

Area codes 450, 579, and 354 are telephone area codes in the North American Numbering Plan in the Canadian province of Quebec, encompassing the off-island suburbs of Montreal, as well as the rest of the Montérégie region southward to the border with New York state. Among the cities in the numbering plan area are Laval, Longueuil, Terrebonne, Saint-Jean-sur-Richelieu, Brossard, Repentigny, Saint-Jérôme, Granby, Blainville and Saint-Hyacinthe.

Area code 450 is also shared by several small communities in an adjacent part of Ontario: some landline customers in Chute-à-Blondeau (East Hawkesbury), near Pointe-Fortune use numbers from the Rigaud exchange 451.

== History ==
Area code 514 served the entire Montreal area for over half-a-century. However, by the mid-1990s, it was on the verge of exhaustion because of Montreal's rapid growth and Canada's inefficient system of number allocation. All competitive local exchange carriers in Canada are allocated blocks of 10,000 numbers for every rate centre in which they plan to offer service, even in the smallest hamlets. Even though most rate centres do not need nearly that many numbers, a number cannot be reallocated elsewhere once it is assigned to a carrier and rate centre. That resulted in thousands of wasted numbers. By the late 20th century, that made a second area code necessary in Canada's second-largest toll-free calling zone.

Area code 450 entered service in 1998. The numbering plan area completely surrounds area code 514, which was confined to the Island of Montreal and a few surrounding islands, and so it is one of the six pairs of "doughnut area codes" in the numbering plan, and the only one in Canada (Toronto's area code 416 also borders Lake Ontario). For that reason, Montrealers sometimes refer to the off-island suburbs as "le 450" (the 450), much like the suburbs of Toronto are called "the 905."

On May 7, 2009, the CRTC ruled that area code 438, which had been used as an overlay for area code 514 since 2006, would be extended to overlay area codes 450 and 514. However, a later decision changed that to overlay only area code 450 with the new area code 579, effective August 21, 2010.

On May 2, 2011, a prepaid mobile telephone registered to "Pierre Poutine, Separatist Street, Joliette," at (450) 760-7746 on Bell Mobility's "Virgin" service played a key role in a robocall scandal in which voters in Guelph, Ontario were inundated with calls directing them to the wrong polling station.

Area code 354 was formally assigned as of February 2, 2019 as an additional area code for the 450/579 overlay complex, but the relief action was suspended indefinitely on October 8, 2019, but went into service by October 22, 2022.

The incumbent local exchange carrier (ILEC) for the 450, 579 and 354 territory is Bell Canada. The major competitive local exchange carriers (CLECs) are Vidéotron and Telus.

== Service area and central office prefixes ==
- Abercorn: see Sutton
- Acton Vale: (450) 236 366 406 546 642
- Ange-Gardien: see Farnham
- Baie-du-Febvre: (450) 783
- Beauharnois: (450) 225 268 270 277 289 351 395 429 617
- Bedford: (450) 203 248 590 (579) 433
- Beloeil: (450) 262 281 339 446 464 467 527 536 600 714 813 864 (579) 229 600 883 949
- Berthierville: (450) 836 (579) 263 358
- Béthanie: see Roxton Falls
- Blainville: (450) 276 280 419 420 430 433 434 435 437 508 543 621 806 818 939 949 951 965 970 971 979 987 (579) 226 238 275 277 477 630 764 987
- Boucherville: (450) 274 300 356 363 449 552 641 645 650 655 857 868 891 906 (579) 215 230 882 900
- Bois-des-Filion: see Blainville
- Boisbriand: see Blainville
- Bolton-Est: see Potton
- Bolton-Ouest: see Lac-Brome
- Bonsecours: see Valcourt
- Brigham: see Cowansville
- Brome: see Lac-Brome
- Bromont: (450) 534 726 919
- Brossard: (450) 443 444 445 462 465 466 486 619 656 659 671 672 676 678 812 890 904 923 926 (579) 723
- Brownsburg-Chatham: (450) 407 533 856
- Calixa-Lavallée: see Verchères
- Candiac: see Brossard
- Carignan: see Chambly
- Chambly: (450) 279 403 447 489 572 593 658 700 715 982 (579) 220 885
- Charlemagne: see Repentigny
- Châteauguay: (450) 201 287 507 691 692 698 699 716 844 977 (579) 288 860 977
- Chertsey: see Rawdon
- Clarenceville: (450) 294
- Contrecœur: (450) 392 401 503 573 587
- Coteau-du-Lac: (450) 308 316 740 763
- Cowansville: (450) 260 263 266 306 815 931 955 (579) 216
- Crabtree: (450) 389 607 754 (579) 264
- Delson: see Saint-Constant
- Deux-Montagnes: see Saint-Eustache
- Dundee: see Saint-Anicet
- Dunham: (450) 284 295 814 (579) 738
- East Farnham: see Cowansville
- Eastman: (450) 297 (579) 437 739
- Elgin: see Saint-Anicet
- Entrelacs: see Sainte-Marguerite-du-Lac-Masson
- Estérel: see Sainte-Marguerite-du-Lac-Masson
- Farnham: (450) 293 337 554 946
- Franklin: (450) 827 (579) 530
- Frelighsburg: (450) 298 (579) 440
- Godmanchester: see Saint-Anicet
- Gore: see Lachute
- Granby: (450) 204 257 305 320 330 360 361 372 375 378 405 521 522 525 531 558 574 577 578 762 770 775 776 777 830 877 915 942 956 991 994 (579) 232 361 488 589 595 787
- Havelock: see Saint-Chrysostome
- Hemmingford: (450) 247 636
- Henryville: (450) 299 (579) 722
- Hinchinbrooke: see Saint-Anicet
- Howick: see Très-Saint-Sacrement
- Hudson: (450) 202 309 458 853
- Huntingdon: see Saint-Anicet
- Joliette: (450) 271 365 386 394 398 404 421 499 559 750 751 752 753 755 756 757 758 759 760 803 867 875 898 916 917 944 960 (579) 244 248 337 500
- Kahnawake: see Saint-Constant
- Kanesatake: see Oka
- L'Assomption: (450) 588 589 591 705 713 749 938 (579) 262
- L'Épiphanie: see L'Assomption
- L'Île-Cadieux: see Vaudreuil-Dorion
- La Prairie: (450) 282 695 724 800 874 907 984 (579) 221 800 869 886
- La Présentation: see Saint-Hyacinthe
- La Visitation-de-l'Île-Dupas: see Berthierville
- La Visitation-de-Yamaska: see Saint-Zéphirin-de-Courval
- Lac-Brome: (450) 242 243 (579) 438 786
- Lac-des-Seize-Îles: see Morin-Heights
- Lachute: (450) 207 331 409 495 562 566 612 613
- Lacolle: (450) 246 604 (579) 431
- Lanoraie: (450) 887 (579) 261 865
- Laval: (450) 231 232 233 234 235 238 239 241 254 255 256 314 315 328 343 367 382 453 490 497 505 506 514 557 575 622 624 625 627 628 629 634 639 661 662 663 664 665 666 667 668 669 680 681 682 683 686 687 688 689 696 697 719 720 727 728 736 767 781 786 828 860 861 862 863 869 879 901 902 903 910 933 934 936 937 962 963 967 969 972 973 975 978 980 981 988 (579) 218 219 231 236 237 242 252 279 300 379 578 679 779 919 929 934 939 969 979 989
- Lavaltrie: (450) 368 540 541 547 576 586 608 935 (579) 260
- Lawrenceville: (450) 535
- Léry: see Châteauguay
- Les Cèdres: (450) 200 317 452 737
- Les Coteaux: see Saint-Zotique
- Longueuil: (450) 286 321 332 396 442 448 463 468 616 626 640 646 647 651 670 674 677 679 693 748 876 892 912 928 999 (579) 214 234 274 721 799 881 999
- Lorraine: see Blainville
- Mandeville: see Saint-Gabriel
- Maricourt: see Valcourt
- Marieville: (450) 460 708 725 900 (579) 222 400 859
- Mascouche: (450) 313 325 417 474 477 722 769 918 966 968 (579) 235
- Massueville: see Saint-Louis
- McMasterville: see Beloeil
- Mercier: see Châteauguay
- Mille-Isles: see Saint-Jérôme
- Mirabel: (450) 258 307 412 414 475 476 594 595 597 (579) 478 838 858
- Mont-Saint-Grégoire: see Saint-Jean-sur-Richelieu
- Mont-Saint-Hilaire: see Beloeil
- Morin Heights: (450) 226 644
- Napierville: (450) 245 570 (579) 430
- Notre-Dame-de-Lourdes: see Joliette
- Notre-Dame-de-Stanbridge: (450) 296 334
- Notre-Dame-des-Prairies: see Joliette
- Noyan: see Saint-Paul-de-l'Île-aux-Noix
- Odanak: see Pierreville
- Oka: (450) 415 479 596 (579) 828
- Ormstown: (450) 829 843
- Otterburn Park: see Beloeil
- Piedmont: see Saint-Sauveur
- Pierreville: (450) 345 568
- Pike River: see Bedford
- Pointe-des-Cascades: see Vaudreuil-Dorion
- Pointe-Calumet: see Saint-Eustache
- Pointe-Fortune: see Rigaud
- Potton: (450) 292 (579) 788
- Prévost: (450) 224 335 643 996
- Racine: see Valcourt
- Rawdon: (450) 333 834 865 882 (579) 258 864
- Repentigny: (450) 470 580 581 582 585 654 657 704 721 841 932 (579) 233 259
- Richelieu: see Chambly
- Rigaud: (450) 206 318 451 738 (579) 227
- Rivière-Beaudette: (450) 269 605
- Rosemère: see Blainville
- Rougemont: see Saint-Césaire
- Roxton: see Roxton Falls
- Roxton Falls: (450) 548 (579) 247
- Roxton Pond: see Granby
- Saint-Aimé: see Saint-Louis
- Saint-Alexandre: see Saint-Jean-sur-Richelieu
- Saint-Alexis: see Saint-Jacques
- Saint-Alphonse-de-Granby: see Granby
- Saint-Alphonse-Rodriguez: (450) 220 850 883
- Saint-Amable: see Sainte-Julie
- Saint-Ambroise-de-Kildare: see Joliette
- Saint-André-d'Argenteuil: (450) 528 537
- Saint-Anicet: (450) 264 957
- Saint-Antoine-sur-Richelieu: see Saint-Denis-sur-Richelieu
- Saint-Armand: see Bedford
- Saint-Barnabé-Sud: see Saint-Jude
- Saint-Barthélemy: (450) 842 885
- Saint-Basile-le-Grand: see Saint-Bruno-de-Montarville
- Saint-Bernard-de-Lacolle: see Lacolle
- Saint-Bernard-de-Michaudville: see Saint-Jude
- Saint-Blaise-sur-Richelieu: see Saint-Paul-de-l'Île-aux-Noix
- Saint-Bruno-de-Montarville: (450) 283 400 441 457 461 482 653 690 723 893 905 (579) 223 809 884
- Saint-Calixte: (450) 214 222 303
- Saint-Césaire: (450) 469 816 947 (579) 737
- Saint-Charles-Borromée: see Joliette
- Saint-Charles-sur-Richelieu: see Saint-Marc-sur-Richelieu
- Saint-Chrysostome: (450) 364 520 637 826
- Saint-Cléophas-de-Brandon: see Saint-Félix-de-Valois
- Saint-Clet: (450) 208 456 606 852
- Saint-Colomban: see Saint-Jérôme
- Saint-Côme: see Saint-Alphonse-Rodriguez
- Saint-Constant: (450) 290 387 509 632 633 635 638 718 845 993 (579) 435
- Saint-Cuthbert: see Berthierville
- Saint-Cyprien-de-Napierville: see Napierville
- Saint-Damase: (450) 342 344 408 797
- Saint-Damien: see Saint-Gabriel
- Saint-David: see Yamaska
- Saint-Denis-sur-Richelieu: (450) 213 787 909
- Saint-Didace: see Saint-Gabriel
- Saint-Dominique: see Saint-Hyacinthe
- Saint-Édouard: see Saint-Rémi
- Saint-Elphège: see Pierreville
- Saint-Esprit: see Sainte-Julienne
- Saint-Étienne-de-Beauharnois: see Beauharnois
- Saint-Étienne-de-Bolton: see Eastman
- Saint-Eustache: (450) 323 413 472 473 485 491 598 623 735 974 983 (579) 251 818 862
- Saint-Félix-de-Valois: (450) 221 837 889
- Saint-François-du-Lac: see Pierreville
- Saint-Gabriel: (450) 835 840 (579) 357
- Saint-Gabriel-de-Brandon: see Saint-Gabriel
- Saint-Gérard-Majella: see Yamaska
- Saint-Hippolyte: (450) 563
- Saint-Hugues: (450) 410 794 894
- Saint-Hyacinthe: (450) 209 223 230 250 251 252 253 261 278 383 385 418 440 484 488 501 502 513 518 768 771 773 774 778 779 796 799 847 888 924 998 (579) 225 228 239 268 452 489 509
- Saint-Ignace-de-Loyola: see Berthierville
- Saint-Ignace-de-Stanbridge: see Notre-Dame-de-Stanbridge
- Saint-Isidore: see Saint-Rémi
- Saint-Jacques: (450) 397 839 866 953
- Saint-Jacques-le-Mineur: see Saint-Jean-sur-Richelieu
- Saint-Jean-Baptiste: see Beloeil
- Saint-Jean-de-Matha: (450) 832 886
- Saint-Jean-sur-Richelieu: (450) 210 272 346 347 348 349 350 357 358 359 376 390 515 523 524 529 542 545 684 741 895 (579) 224 267 700
- Saint-Jérôme: (450) 275 304 327 431 432 436 438 504 512 516 530 553 560 565 569 592 602 660 675 694 710 712 820 821 822 848 858 990 (579) 240 278 765 888 990
- Saint-Joachim-de-Shefford: see Shefford
- Saint-Joseph-de-Sorel: see Sorel-Tracy
- Saint-Joseph-du-Lac: see Saint-Eustache
- Saint-Jude: (450) 423 790 792
- Saint-Lambert: (450) 259 341 500 550 618 648 673 761 766 878 896 (579) 241 266 720 880
- Saint-Lazare: see Vaudreuil-Dorion
- Saint-Liboire: (450) 793 (579) 245
- Saint-Liguori: see Joliette
- Saint-Lin-Laurentides: (450) 215 302 439
- Saint-Louis: (450) 788
- Saint-Louis-de-Gonzague: see Salaberry-de-Valleyfield
- Saint-Marc-sur-Richelieu: (450) 584 614 709 805
- Saint-Marcel-de-Richelieu: see Saint-Hugues
- Saint-Mathias-sur-Richelieu: see Chambly
- Saint-Mathieu: see Saint-Constant
- Saint-Mathieu-de-Beloeil: see Beloeil
- Saint-Michel: see Saint-Rémi
- Saint-Michel-des-Saints: (450) 833 870
- Saint-Nazaire-d'Acton: see Acton Vale
- Saint-Norbert: see Berthierville
- Saint-Ours: see Saint-Roch-de-Richelieu
- Saint-Patrice-de-Sherrington: see Saint-Rémi
- Saint-Paul: see Joliette
- Saint-Paul-d'Abbotsford: (450) 379 817 948
- Saint-Paul-de-l'Île-aux-Noix: (450) 291 930 945 (579) 432
- Saint-Philippe: see Brossard
- Saint-Pie: (450) 388 425 428 599 772 872
- Saint-Pie-de-Guire: (450) 706 784
- Saint-Pierre: see Joliette
- Saint-Placide: see Mirabel
- Saint-Polycarpe: (450) 216 265 526 620
- Saint-Rémi: (450) 301 454 481 615 992 (579) 434
- Saint-Robert: see Sainte-Victoire-de-Sorel
- Saint-Roch-de-l'Achigan: see L'Assomption
- Saint-Roch-de-Richelieu: (450) 402 571 785
- Saint-Roch-Ouest: see L'Assomption
- Saint-Sauveur: (450) 227 240 336 340 630 744 927 995
- Saint-Sébastien: see Saint-Jean-sur-Richelieu
- Saint-Simon: (450) 380 384 426 798
- Saint-Stanislas-de-Kostka: see Salaberry-de-Valleyfield
- Saint-Sulpice: see L'Assomption
- Saint-Télesphore: see Rivière-Beaudette
- Saint-Théodore-d'Acton: see Acton Vale
- Saint-Thomas: see Joliette
- Saint-Urbain-Premier: see Sainte-Martine
- Saint-Valentin: see Saint-Paul-de-l'Île-aux-Noix
- Saint-Valérien-de-Milton: see Upton
- Saint-Zénon: (450) 884
- Saint-Zéphirin-de-Courval: (450) 564
- Saint-Zotique: (450) 217 267 739 913
- Sainte-Adèle: (450) 229 745
- Sainte-Angèle-de-Monnoir: see Marieville
- Sainte-Anne-de-la-Rochelle: see Shefford
- Sainte-Anne-de-Sabrevois: see Saint-Jean-sur-Richelieu
- Sainte-Anne-de-Sorel: see Sorel-Tracy
- Sainte-Anne-des-Lacs: see Prévost
- Sainte-Anne-des-Plaines: (450) 205 478 707 838 940 941 (579) 479
- Sainte-Barbe: see Salaberry-de-Valleyfield
- Sainte-Béatrix: see Saint-Alphonse-Rodriguez
- Sainte-Brigide-d'Iberville: see Farnham
- Sainte-Catherine: see Saint-Constant
- Sainte-Cécile-de-Milton: see Granby
- Sainte-Clotilde: see Saint-Chrysostome
- Sainte-Émélie-de-l'Énergie: see Saint-Jean-de-Matha
- Sainte-Geneviève-de-Berthier: see Berthierville
- Sainte-Hélène-de-Bagot: (450) 381 480 791 997
- Sainte-Julie: (450) 324 338 649 685 733 804 922 986
- Sainte-Julienne: (450) 399 831 952
- Sainte-Justine-de-Newton: (450) 609 764
- Sainte-Madeleine: see Sainte-Marie-Madelaine
- Sainte-Marcelline-de-Kildare: see Saint-Alphonse-Rodriguez
- Sainte-Marguerite-du-Lac-Masson: (450) 228
- Sainte-Marie-Madeleine: (450) 355 493 496 701 702 703 795
- Sainte-Marie-Salomé: see Saint-Jacques
- Sainte-Marthe: (450) 391 459
- Sainte-Marthe-sur-le-Lac: see Saint-Eustache
- Sainte-Martine: (450) 212 427 498 519
- Sainte-Mélanie: see Saint-Félix-de-Valois
- Sainte-Sabine: (450) 393 (579) 394
- Sainte-Sophie: see Saint-Jérôme
- Sainte-Thérèse: see Blainville
- Sainte-Victoire-de-Sorel: (450) 422 782 989
- Salaberry-de-Valleyfield: (450) 219 288 322 369 370 371 373 374 377 544 567 601 631 747 801 802 807 854 859 921 (579) 250 491
- Shefford: (450) 539 734 920 (579) 439 797
- Sorel-Tracy: (450) 249 352 494 517 551 556 561 730 742 743 746 780 808 846 855 880 881 899 908 943 954 (579) 243 249
- Stanbridge East: see Bedford
- Stanbridge Station: see Bedford
- Stukely-Sud: see Eastman
- Sutton: (450) 538 (579) 436 789
- Terrebonne: (450) 312 326 416 471 492 729 765 824 914 961 964 (579) 808 863 914
- Très-Saint-Rédempteur: see Rigaud
- Très-Saint-Sacrement: (450) 237 353 603 825
- Upton: (450) 549
- Valcourt: (450) 532 (579) 246
- Varennes: (450) 285 652 731 809 925 929 985
- Vaudreuil-Dorion: (450) 218 319 424 455 510 732 897 (579) 217 490
- Vaudreuil-sur-le-Lac: see Vaudreuil-Dorion
- Venise-en-Québec: (450) 244 329
- Verchères: (450) 583 717 823 849
- Warden: see Shefford
- Waterloo: see Shefford
- Wentworth: see Lachute
- Wentworth-Nord: see Morin-Heights
- Yamaska: (450) 362 483 789
- Shared-cost service: (450) 310
- Premium service: (1+450/579) 976.

== See also ==
- List of NANP area codes
- North American Numbering Plan

== Notes ==
Quebec area codes: 367/418/581, 354/450/579, 263/438/514, 468/819/873
	North: 819/873	
West: 613/343, 819/873	Area code 450/579/354 completely surrounding 514/438/263	East: 819/873
	South: 518	
New York area codes: 212/332/646, 315/680, 363/516, 518/838, 585, 607, 631/934, 624/716, 347/718/929, 329/845, 914, 917
Ontario area codes: 416/437/647/942, 519/226/548/382, 613/343/753, 705/249/683, 807, 905/289/365/742
