= Vaudreuil-sur-le-Lac =

- Village municipality
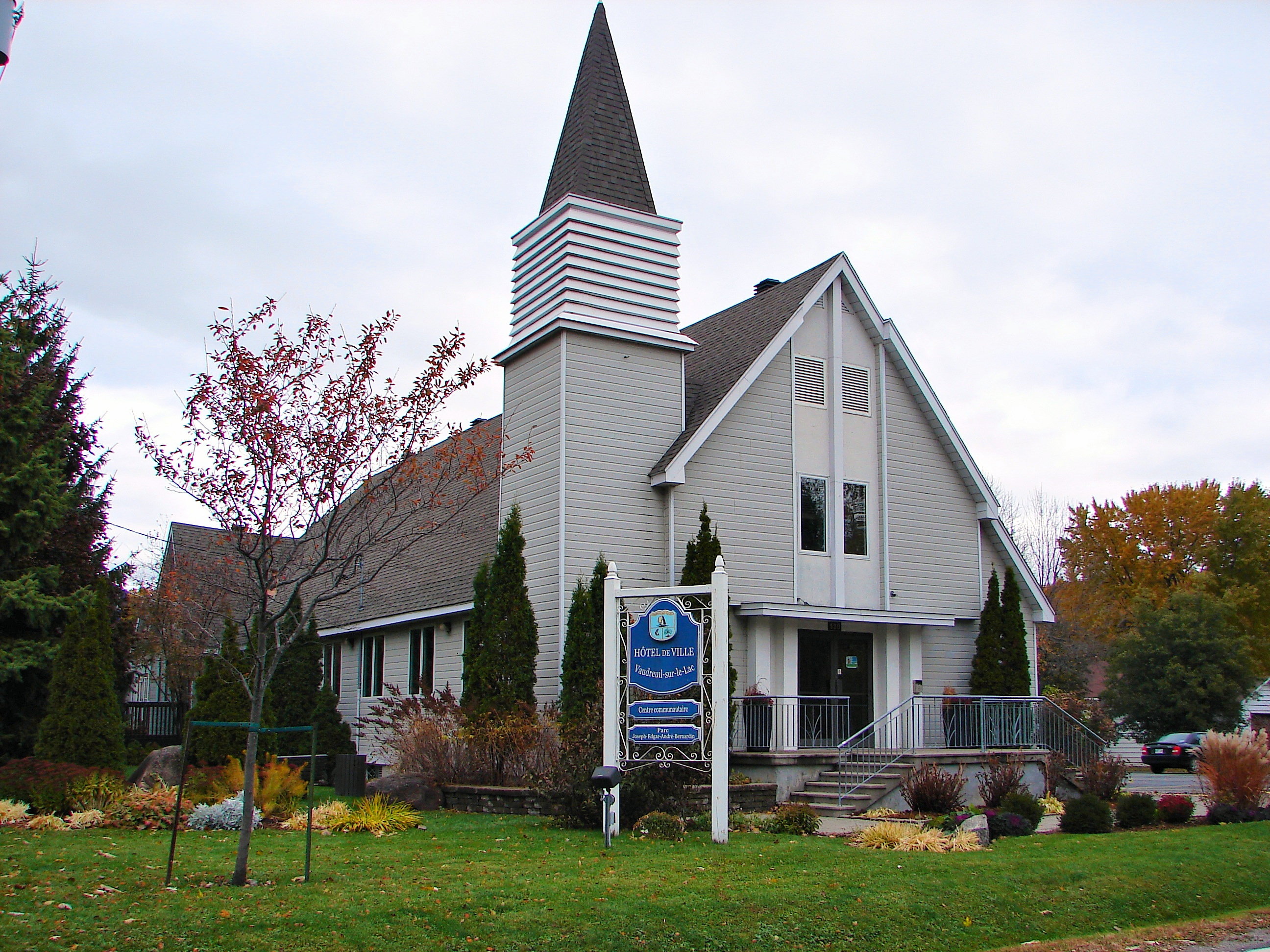
- Town hall

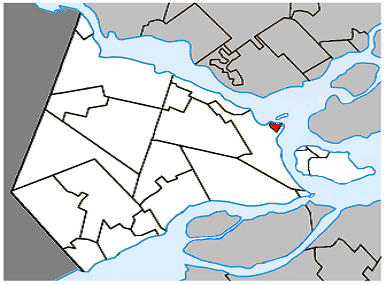
- Location within Vaudreuil-Soulanges RCM

- Location in southern Quebec
- Coordinates: 45°24′N 74°02′W
- Country: Canada
- Province: Quebec
- Region: Montérégie
- RCM: Vaudreuil-Soulanges
- Constituted: May 29, 1920

Government
  - Mayor: Mario Tremblay
  - Federal riding: Vaudreuil
  - Prov. riding: Vaudreuil

Area
  - Total: 2.80 km^{2} (1.08 sq mi)
  - Land: 1.39 km^{2} (0.54 sq mi)

Population (2016)
  - Total: 1,341
  - Density: 962/km^{2} (2,490/sq mi)
  - Pop 2011-2016: ▼1.3%
  - Dwellings: 504
- Time zone: UTC−5 (EST)
  - Summer (DST): UTC−4 (EDT)
- Postal code(s): J7V 8P3, J7V 9R7
- Area codes: 450 and 579
- Highways: No major routes
- Website: www.vsll.ca

Vaudreuil-sur-le-Lac (French pronunciation: [vodʁœj syʁ lə lak], lit. 'Vaudreuil on the Lake') is a village municipality in Vaudreuil-Soulanges Regional County Municipality in the Montérégie region of Quebec, Canada. It is located on the western portion of the Vaudreuil Peninsula, which projects into Lake of Two Mountains. The population as of the Canada 2016 Census was 1,341.

Vaudreuil-sur-le-Lac is predominantly residential (90%), and only 10% industrial and commercial. The Club Nautique des Deux-Montagnes attracts many sailing enthusiasts.

== History ==
Early in the twentieth century, the first vacationers arrived here, attracted to the beauty of the lakeshore. May 19, 1920, marked the date of the incorporation of the village Municipality of Belle-Plage (meaning "beautiful beach"), with Ludger Dupont as first mayor. Belle-Plage was then primarily known as a vacation destination: there were 77 owners for a total of about 300 people but only seven families residing here permanently.

On January 4, 1960, the Municipal Council changed the name of "Belle-Plage" to "Vaudreuil-sur-le-Lac". The new village name is a reference to the historic Vaudreuil Seignory, granted to and named after Philippe de Rigaud Vaudreuil, Governor of New France from 1703 to 1725.

In the early 1960s, the region began to be transformed into a residential suburb of Montreal City following the construction of the Île aux Tourtes Bridge and Highway 40, which passes Vaudreuil-sur-le-Lac just to the south. Consequently, in the late sixties the village began to witness a perceptible increase in population.

== Demographics ==
Historical Census Data - Vaudreuil-sur-le-Lac, Quebec
Year	Pop.	±%
1976	433	—
1981	583	+34.6%
1986	673	+15.4%
1991	876	+30.2%
1996	928	+5.9%
2001	893	−3.8%
2006	1,290	+44.5%
2011	1,359	+5.3%
2016	1,341	−1.3%
2021	1,361	+1.5%
Source: Statistics Canada

In the 2021 Census of Population conducted by Statistics Canada, Vaudreuil-sur-le-Lac had a population of 1,361 living in 484 of its 494 total private dwellings, a change of 1.5% from its 2016 population of 1,341. With a land area of 1.38 km^{2} (0.53 sq mi), it had a population density of 986.2/km^{2} (2,554.3/sq mi) in 2021.

Canada census – Vaudreuil-sur-le-Lac community profile

	2021	2016	2011
Population	1361 (1.5% from 2016)	1,341 (-1.3% from 2011)	1,359 (+5.3% from 2006)
Land area	1.38 km^{2} (0.53 sq mi)	1.39 km^{2} (0.54 sq mi)	1.37 km^{2} (0.53 sq mi)
Population density	983/km^{2} (2,550/sq mi)	962.0/km^{2} (2,492/sq mi)	989.2/km^{2} (2,562/sq mi)
Median age		44.1 (M: 44.1, F: 44.1)	41.3 (M: 41.3, F: 41.2)
Private dwellings	485 (total)	504 (total)	479 (total)
Median household income	$112,000	$110,848	$90,200

References: 2021 2016 2011

Canada Census Mother Tongue - Vaudreuil-sur-le-Lac, Quebec
Census	Total	French			English			French & English			Other		
Year	Responses	Count	Trend	Pop %	Count	Trend	Pop %	Count	Trend	Pop %	Count	Trend	Pop %
2021	1,361	835	▼11.6%	61.2%	255	▲13.3%	18.7%	75	▲275%	5.6%	200	▲53.8%	14.9%
2016	1,340	945	▼4.7%	70.52%	225	0.0%	16.79%	20	▼20.0%	1.49%	130	▲30.0%	9.70%
2011	1,345	995	▲3.1%	73.98%	225	▲7.1%	16.73%	25	▲150.0%	1.86%	100	▼4.8%	7.43%
2006	1,290	965	▲32.2%	74.81%	210	▲133.3%	16.28%	10	0.0%	0.77%	105	▲61.5%	8.14%
2001	895	730	▼11.5%	81.56%	90	▲20.0%	10.06%	10	0.0%	1.12%	65	▲160.0%	7.26%
1996	935	825	n/a	88.24%	75	n/a	8.02%	10	n/a	1.07%	25	n/a	2.67%

== Local government ==
The city council consists of the mayor and six councilors. Municipal elections are held every four years as a block, without a “territorial division” [1]. Mayor Claude Pilon resigned on January 6, 2020 after 31 years of service. Mr. André Bélanger acted as deputy mayor from January 7 until December 18. Mr. Philip Lapalme won the by-election and took office as the new mayor on December 18, 2020 to November 7, 2021 after being defeated by Mario Tremblay at the general election on November 7, 2021. The director general and secretary-treasurer is Mario B. Briggs.

Composition of the municipal council
	2013-2017	2017-2020	2020-2021	2021-2025
Mayor	Claude Pilon	Claude Pilon	Philip Lapalme	Mario Tremblay
Counselors	André Bélanger, Ginette Bradley, Louise Chénier, Paul Lesage, Denis Morin, Sylvie Poirier	Ginette Bradley, André Bélanger, Denis Morin, Paul Lesage, Philip Lapalme, Louise Chénier	Ginette Bradley, André Bélanger, Elizabeth Tomaras, Martine André, Marc Lafontaine, Louise Chénier	David Yee, Mei Lin Yee, Liliane Besner, Martine André, Gilles Massey, Jacques Ostiguy

=== Former mayors ===
List of former mayors:

- Charles George Hector Dupont (1920–1929)
- Joseph Telesphore Lalonde (1920–1931)
- Joseph Antoine Dona Guinard (1931–1953)
- Joseph Marie Marcel Simard (1953–1955)
- Olivier Picard (1955–1960)
- Joseph Eugène Raoul Roland Sauvage (1960–1966)
- Joseph Jean Jacques Sauvage (1966–1975)
- Joseph Roland Antoine Roger Besner (1975–1987)
- Luc Tison (1987–1998)
- Claude Pilon (1998–2020)
- André Bélanger (interim 2020)
- Philip Lapalme (2020–2021)
- Mario Tremblay (2021–present)

== Education ==
Commission Scolaire des Trois-Lacs operates Francophone schools. It is zoned to École Saint-Michel and École Sainte-Madeleine in Vaudreuil-Dorion.

Lester B. Pearson School Board operates Anglophone schools. It is zoned to Mount Pleasant Elementary School in Hudson.

== See also ==
- List of anglophone communities in Quebec
- List of village municipalities in Quebec
