= Sainte-Angèle-de-Monnoir, Quebec =

Sainte-Angèle-de-Monnoir
- Municipality
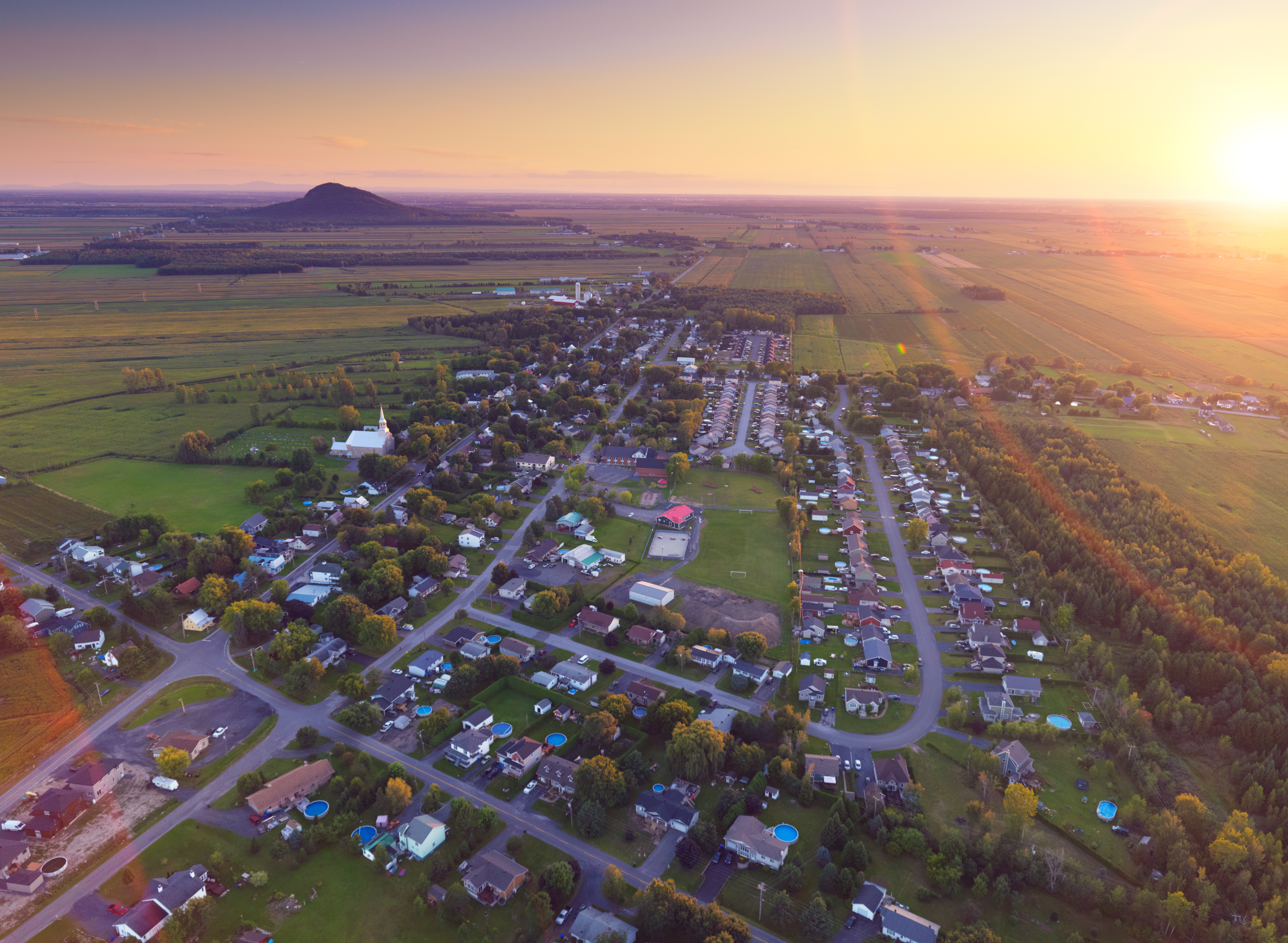

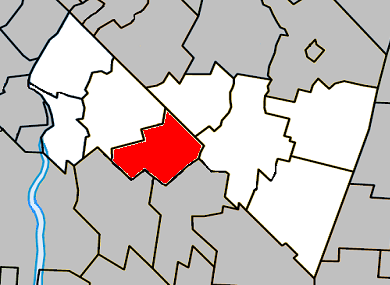
- Location within Rouville RCM.

- Location in southern Quebec.
- Coordinates: 45°23′N 73°06′W
- Country: Canada
- Province: Quebec
- Region: Montérégie
- RCM: Rouville
- Constituted: March 15, 1865

Government
  - Mayor: Denis Paquin
  - Federal riding: Shefford
  - Prov. riding: Iberville

Area
  - Total: 45.10 km^{2} (17.41 sq mi)
  - Land: 45.40 km^{2} (17.53 sq mi)
- There is an apparent contradiction between two authoritative sources

Population (2011)
  - Total: 1,812
  - Density: 39.9/km^{2} (103/sq mi)
  - Pop 2006-2011: ▲17.7%
  - Dwellings: 700
- Time zone: UTC−5 (EST)
  - Summer (DST): UTC−4 (EDT)
- Postal code(s): J0L 1P0
- Area codes: 450 and 579
- Highways A-10: R-112; R-227
- Website: www.municipalite. sainte-angele-de-monnoir.qc.ca

Sainte-Angèle-de-Monnoir (French pronunciation: [sɛ̃t‿ɑ̃ʒɛl də mɔnwaʁ]) is a municipality in the Canadian province of Quebec. The population as of the Canada 2011 Census was 1,812. It is located within the Rouville Regional County Municipality in the Montérégie region about 18 kilometers east of Chambly.

== Demographics ==
=== Population ===
Population trend:

Census	Population	Change (%)
2011	1,812	▲17.7%
2006	1,540	▲5.8%
2001	1,450	▼2.1%
1996	1,481	▲6.5%
1991	1,391	N/A

=== Language ===
Mother tongue language (2006)

Language	Population	Pct (%)
French only	1,125	97.83%
English only	10	0.87%
Both English and French	1	0.01%
Other languages	15	1.30%

== Education ==
The South Shore Protestant Regional School Board previously served the municipality.

== See also ==
- List of municipalities in Quebec
