= List of village municipalities in Quebec =

This is the list of communities in Quebec that have the legal status of village municipalities (French: municipalité de village or simply village, code=VL) as defined by the Ministry of Municipal Affairs, Regions and Land Occupancy.

This does not include Cree villages (code=VC), Naskapi villages (code=VK), or Northern villages (Inuit, code=VN), which have a separate legal status.

== List ==
Village municipality	Regional county municipality	Area (km^{2})	Population (2006)
Abercorn	Brome-Missisquoi	27.84	358
Ayer's Cliff	Memphrémagog	11.15	1076
Baie-Trinité	Manicouagan	536.33	512
Brome	Brome-Missisquoi	11.75	274
Chute-aux-Outardes	Manicouagan	8.31	1811
Fort-Coulonge	Pontiac	3.44	1495
Godbout	Manicouagan	204.34	341
Grandes-Piles	Mékinac	115.38	358
Grenville	Argenteuil	3.05	1398
Hébertville-Station	Lac-Saint-Jean-Est	33.28	1250
Hemmingford	Les Jardins-de-Napierville	0.85	771
Kingsbury	Le Val-Saint-François	6.26	92
Lac-Poulin	Beauce-Sartigan	1.08	139
Lac-Saguay	Antoine-Labelle	176.26	496
La Guadeloupe	Beauce-Sartigan	31.67	1740
Laurier-Station	Lotbinière	12.43	2444
Lawrenceville	Le Val-Saint-François	17.40	659
Marsoui	La Haute-Gaspésie	182.95	331
Massueville	Pierre-De Saurel	1.29	504
Mont-Saint-Pierre	La Haute-Gaspésie	60.45	220
North Hatley	Memphrémagog	3.23	731
Notre-Dame-du-Bon-Conseil	Drummond	4.22	1388
Ormstown	Le Haut-Saint-Laurent	143.7	
Pointe-aux-Outardes	Manicouagan	71.56	1479
Pointe-des-Cascades	Vaudreuil-Soulanges	2.66	1127
Pointe-Fortune	Vaudreuil-Soulanges	9.09	501
Pointe-Lebel	Manicouagan	91.16	1975
Portage-du-Fort	Pontiac	4.24	294
Price	La Mitis	2.35	1782
Roxton Falls	Acton	5.25	1342
Saint-André-du-Lac-Saint-Jean	Le Domaine-du-Roy	157.75	461
Saint-Célestin	Nicolet-Yamaska	1.61	788
Saint-Noël	La Matapédia	45.68	477
Saint-Pierre	Joliette	10.60	303
Sainte-Jeanne-d'Arc	Maria-Chapdelaine	270.88	1143
Sainte-Madeleine	Les Maskoutains	5.30	2240
Sainte-Pétronille	L'Île-d'Orléans	4.50	1078
Senneville	none	7.84	958
Stukely-Sud	Memphrémagog	66,31	962
Tadoussac	La Haute-Côte-Nord	74.59	872
Tring-Jonction	Beauce-Centre	25.71	1377
Val-David	Les Laurentides	43.17	4284
Vaudreuil-sur-le-Lac	Vaudreuil-Soulanges	1.73	1374
Warden	La Haute-Yamaska	5.28	376

== See also ==
- Administrative divisions of Quebec
- 21st-century municipal history of Quebec
