= Jaune River (Noire River tributary) =

River in Montérégie, Quebec, Canada

- Location within Quebec
- Native name: Rivière Jaune (French)

Location
- Country: Canada
- Province: Quebec
- Administrative region: Montérégie
- MRC: Acton Regional County Municipality
- Municipality: Roxton Falls and Acton Vale

Physical characteristics
- Source: 8e rang de Roxton Falls
  - location: Saint-Théodore-d'Acton
  - coordinates: 45.544877°N 72.390492°W
  - elevation: 199
- Mouth: Yamaska River
  - location: Acton Vale
  - coordinates: 45.60639°N 72.55583°W
  - elevation: 72 m
- Length: 18.8 km (11.7 mi)

Basin features
- River system: Saint Lawrence River
- Tributaries
  - right: ruisseau Maheu

The Yellow River is a tributary of the Noire River. It flows in the municipalities of Roxton Falls and Acton Vale, in the Acton Regional County Municipality, in the administrative region of Montérégie, on the South Shore of St. Lawrence River, in Quebec, Canada.

== Geography ==
The main hydrographic slopes neighboring the Yellow River are:

- north side: Cyr stream, Poireau stream, rivière le Renne;
- east side: Ulverton River;
- south side: Noire River (Yamaska River tributary);
- west side: Noire River (Yamaska River tributary).

The Yellow River draws its sources in 8e rang north of a marsh area located southeast of the village of Roxton Falls and northwest of the village of Valcourt.

Its course flows to the northwest, especially in agricultural areas, sometimes crossing forest areas. Its course runs east of the village of Roxton Falls. From the head zone, the Yellow River flows 6.2 km northwest to Chemin de Béthanie. Then the river flows 6.8 km west in an agricultural area to the route 222 which it crosses 1.7 km northeast of the center of Roxton Falls. Then, the river continues on 5.8 km towards the northwest by winding in agricultural zone until its mouth.

The Yellow River flows in a bend on the east bank of the Noire River (Yamaska River tributary) to Acton Vale, 2.4 km south of the railway crossing the village from Acton Vale, 2.3 km north of the village center of Roxton Falls, 0.9 km west of route 139, 0.9 km south from Place-Lavallée and 2.3 km upstream from Île aux Pins.

== Toponymy ==
The toponym "Rivière Jaune" was officially registered on December 5, 1968 at the Commission de toponymie du Québec.

== See also ==
- Yamaska River, a stream
- Noire River (Yamaska River tributary), a stream
- Acton Vale, a municipality
- Roxton Falls, a municipality
- Acton Regional County Municipality
- List of rivers of Quebec
