= Ange-Gardien =

- Municipality
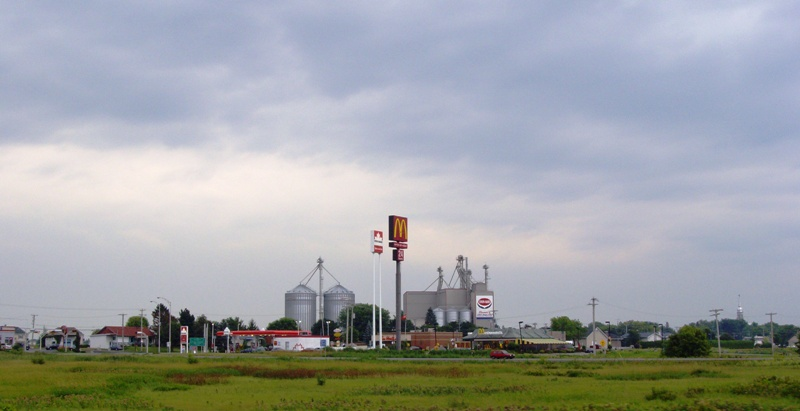

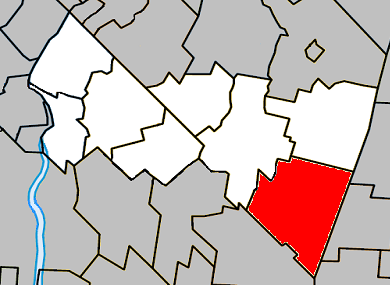
- Location within Rouville RCM

- Location in southern Quebec
- Coordinates: 45°21′N 072°56′W
- Country: Canada
- Province: Quebec
- Region: Montérégie
- RCM: Rouville
- Constituted: December 31, 1997

Government
  - Mayor: Yvan Pinsonneault
  - Federal riding: Shefford
  - Prov. riding: Iberville

Area
  - Total: 90.29 km^{2} (34.86 sq mi)
  - Land: 89.99 km^{2} (34.75 sq mi)

Population (2016)
  - Total: 2,699
  - Density: 29.9/km^{2} (77/sq mi)
  - Pop 2011–2016: ▲11.5%
  - Dwellings: 1,069
- Time zone: UTC−05:00 (EST)
  - Summer (DST): UTC−04:00 (EDT)
- Postal code(s): J0E 1E0
- Area codes: 450 and 579
- Highways A-10: R-235
- Website: www.municipalite.ange-gardien.qc.ca

Ange-Gardien (French pronunciation: [ɑ̃ʒ ɡaʁdjɛ̃]) is a municipality in the Canadian province of Quebec, located within the Rouville Regional County Municipality in the province's Montérégie region. The population as of the 2016 Canadian Census was 2,699.

It was constituted on December 31, 1997, by the amalgamation of the village municipality of L'Ange-Gardien and the parish municipality of Saint-Ange-Gardien; the former is not to be confused with two other present-day municipalities in Quebec called "L'Ange-Gardien".

== Demographics ==
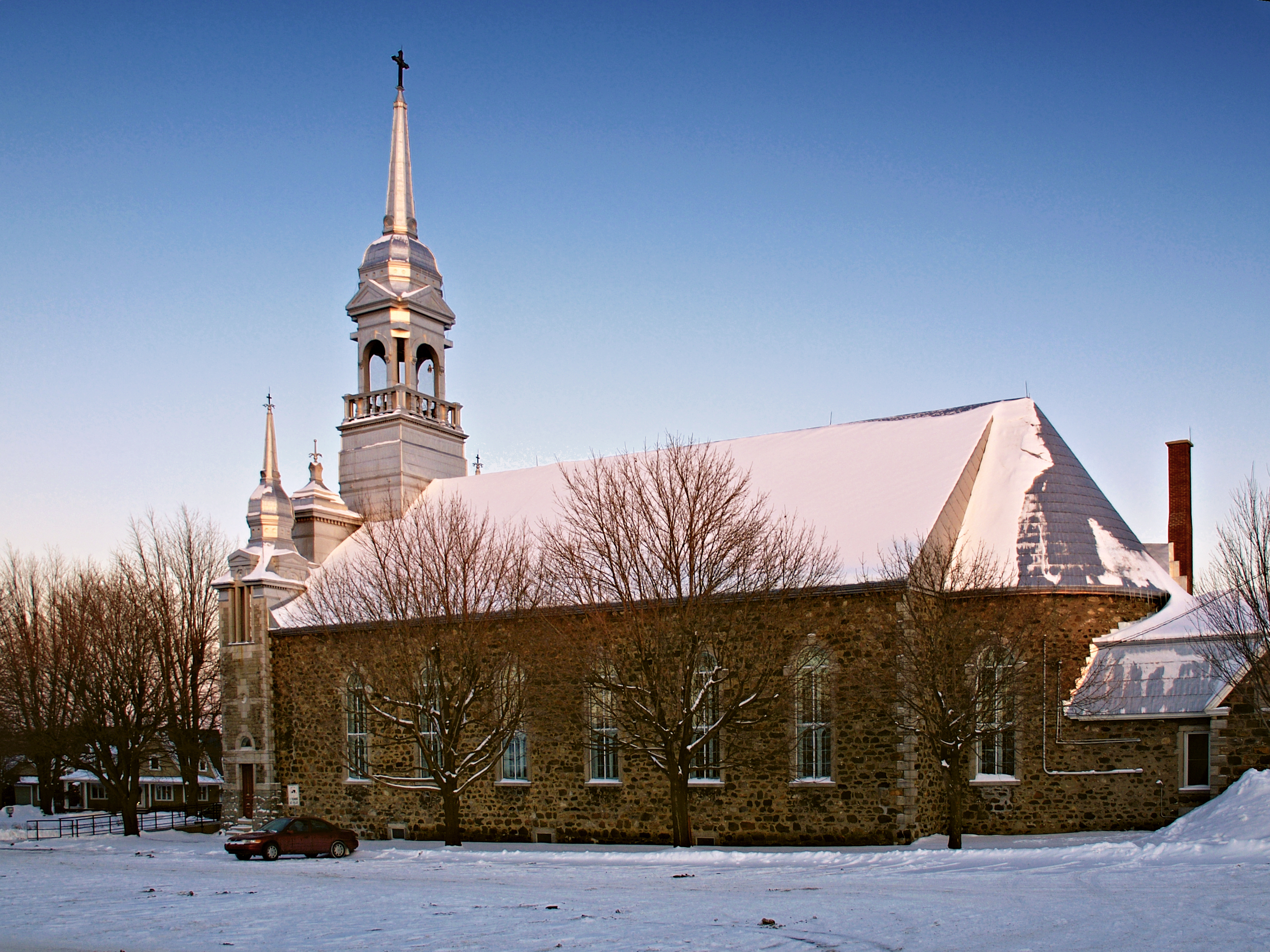
Catholic Church at Ange-Gardien

=== Population ===
Population trend:

Census	Population	Change (%)
2011	2,420	▲21.8%
2006	1,987	▼0.4%
2001	1,994	▲4.3%
Merger	1,911 (+)	▲68.66%
1996	599	▲6.4%
1991	553	N/A

(+) Amalgamation of the Parish of Saint-Ange-Gardien and the Village of L'Ange-Gardien on December 31, 1997.

=== Language ===
Mother tongue language (2016)

Language	Population	Pct (%)
French only	2,570	96.6%
English only	40	1.5%
Both English and French	10	0.4%
Other languages	35	1.3%

== See also ==
- List of municipalities in Quebec
- 20th-century municipal history of Quebec
