= Roxton, Quebec =

Canton de Roxton
- Township municipality
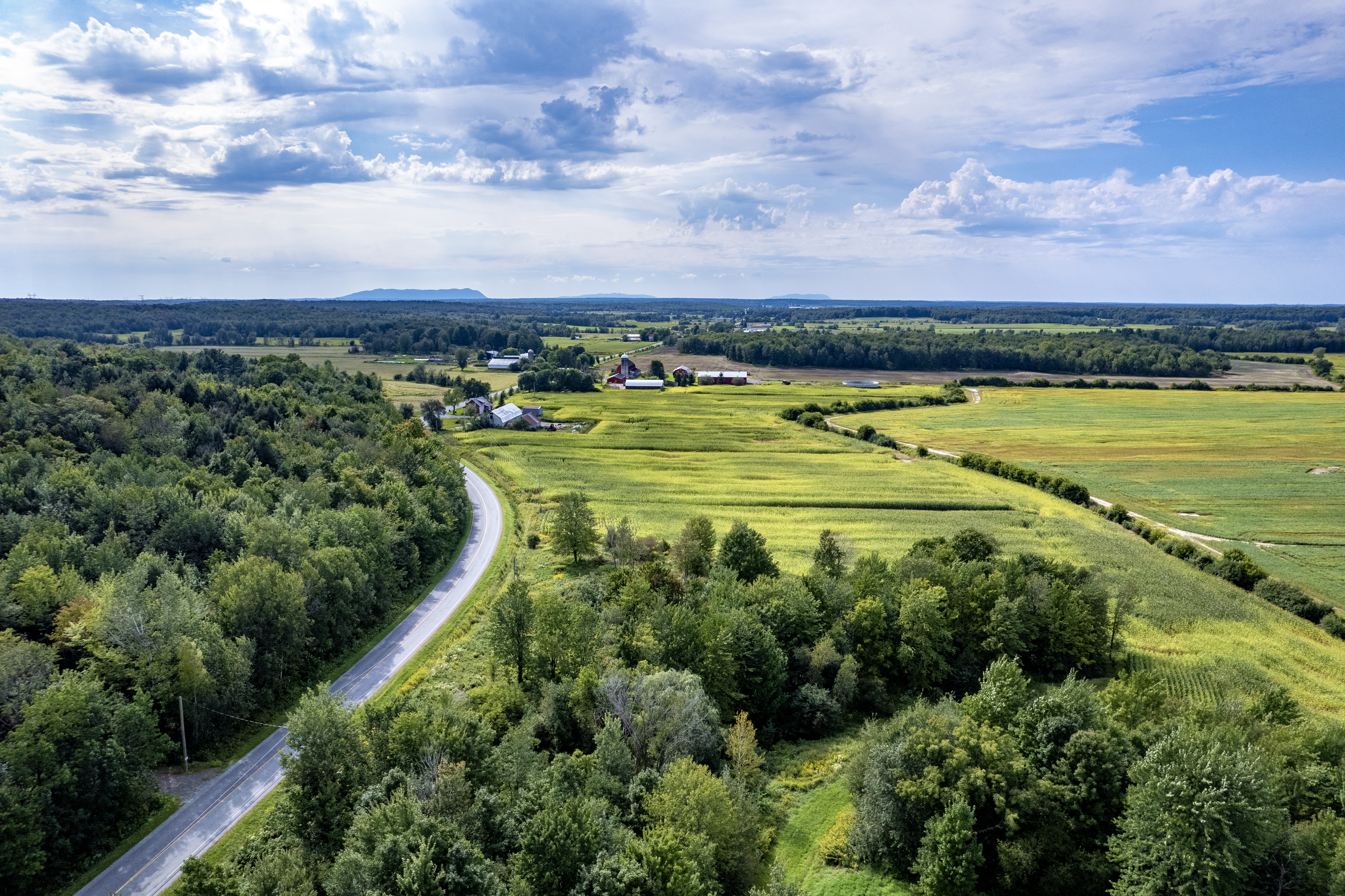

- Seal

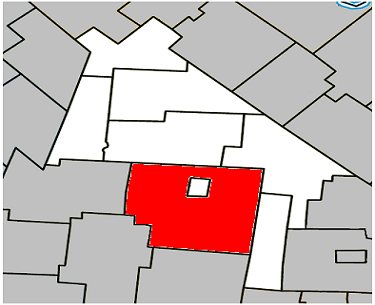
- Location within Acton RCM

- Location in southern Quebec
- Coordinates: 45°33′N 72°31′W
- Country: Canada
- Province: Quebec
- Region: Montérégie
- RCM: Acton
- Designated: 1795
- Proclaimed: 1803
- Municipally constituted: July 1, 1855
- Named for: Roxton, Bedfordshire

Government
  - Mayor: Stéphane Beauchemin
  - Federal riding: Saint-Hyacinthe—Bagot—Acton
  - Prov. riding: Daniel-Johnson

Area
  - Total: 150.10 km^{2} (57.95 sq mi)
  - Land: 149.08 km^{2} (57.56 sq mi)

Population (2011)
  - Total: 1,093
  - Density: 7.3/km^{2} (19/sq mi)
  - Pop 2006-2011: ▲7.6%
  - Dwellings: 454
- Time zone: UTC−5 (EST)
  - Summer (DST): UTC−4 (EDT)
- Postal code(s): J0H 1E0
- Area codes: 450 and 579
- Highways: R-139; R-222; R-241
- Website: cantonderoxton.qc.ca

Le Canton de Roxton is a township municipality (municipalité de canton) in the Acton Regional County Municipality, in the province of Quebec, Canada. The municipality was designated in 1795, proclaimed in 1803, and officially constituted on July 1, 1855. The population as of the Canada 2011 Census was 1,093.

Le Canton de Roxton has its own distinct municipal administration and elected officials, independent from the neighbouring village of Roxton Falls.

Le Canton de Roxton has only a few hundred fewer people than Roxton Falls, but is spread out over a much greater geographic area.

== Demographics ==
In the 2021 Census of Population conducted by Statistics Canada, Roxton had a population of 1,115 living in 445 of its 483 total private dwellings, a change of 2.7% from its 2016 population of 1,086. With a land area of 148.93 km^{2} (57.50 sq mi), it had a population density of 7.5/km^{2} (19.4/sq mi) in 2021.

Population trend:

Census	Population	Change (%)
2011	1,093	▲7.6%
2006	1,016	▼2.4%
2001	1,041	▼6.7%
1996	1,116	▼0.4%
1991	1,120	N/A

Mother tongue language (2006)

Language	Population	Pct (%)
French only	970	96.04%
English only	30	2.97%
Both English and French	10	0.99%
Other languages	0	0.00%

== See also ==
- List of township municipalities in Quebec
