= Roxton Falls, Quebec =

Roxton Falls
- Village municipality
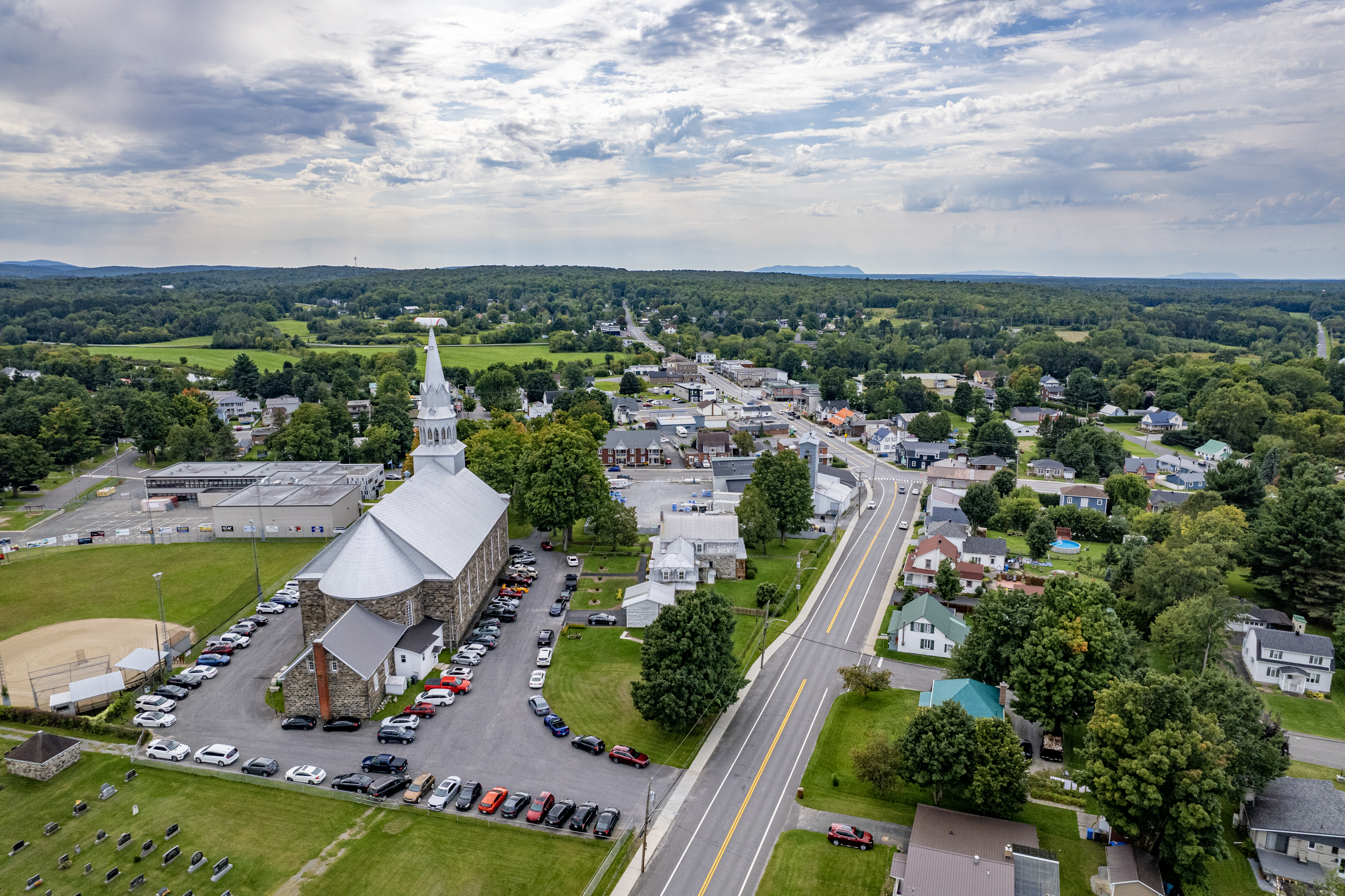

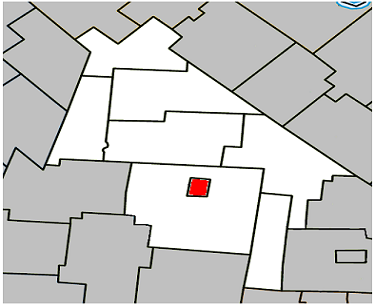
- Location within Acton RCM

- Location in southern Quebec
- Coordinates: 45°34′N 72°31′W
- Country: Canada
- Province: Quebec
- Region: Montérégie
- RCM: Acton
- Constituted: January 1, 1863

Government
  - Mayor: Pierre Larivière
  - Federal riding: Saint-Hyacinthe—Bagot—Acton
  - Prov. riding: Daniel-Johnson

Area
  - Total: 5.10 km^{2} (1.97 sq mi)
  - Land: 4.88 km^{2} (1.88 sq mi)

Population (2011)
  - Total: 1,265
  - Density: 259.1/km^{2} (671/sq mi)
  - Pop 2006-2011: ▼3.1%
  - Dwellings: 576
- Time zone: UTC−5 (EST)
  - Summer (DST): UTC−4 (EDT)
- Postal code(s): J0H 1E0
- Area codes: 450 and 579
- Highways: R-139; R-222; R-241
- Website: www.roxtonfalls.ca

Roxton Falls is a village municipality in Acton Regional County Municipality, in the Canadian province of Quebec. The population as of the Canada 2011 Census was 1,265.

It is surrounded entirely by the township municipality of Roxton. Roxton Falls and Roxton are legally distinct municipalities (with separate elected officials), but the administration of both is physically located in the village of Roxton Falls.

Roxton Falls has only a few hundred more people than Roxton, but is concentrated in a much smaller geographic area.

== Geography ==
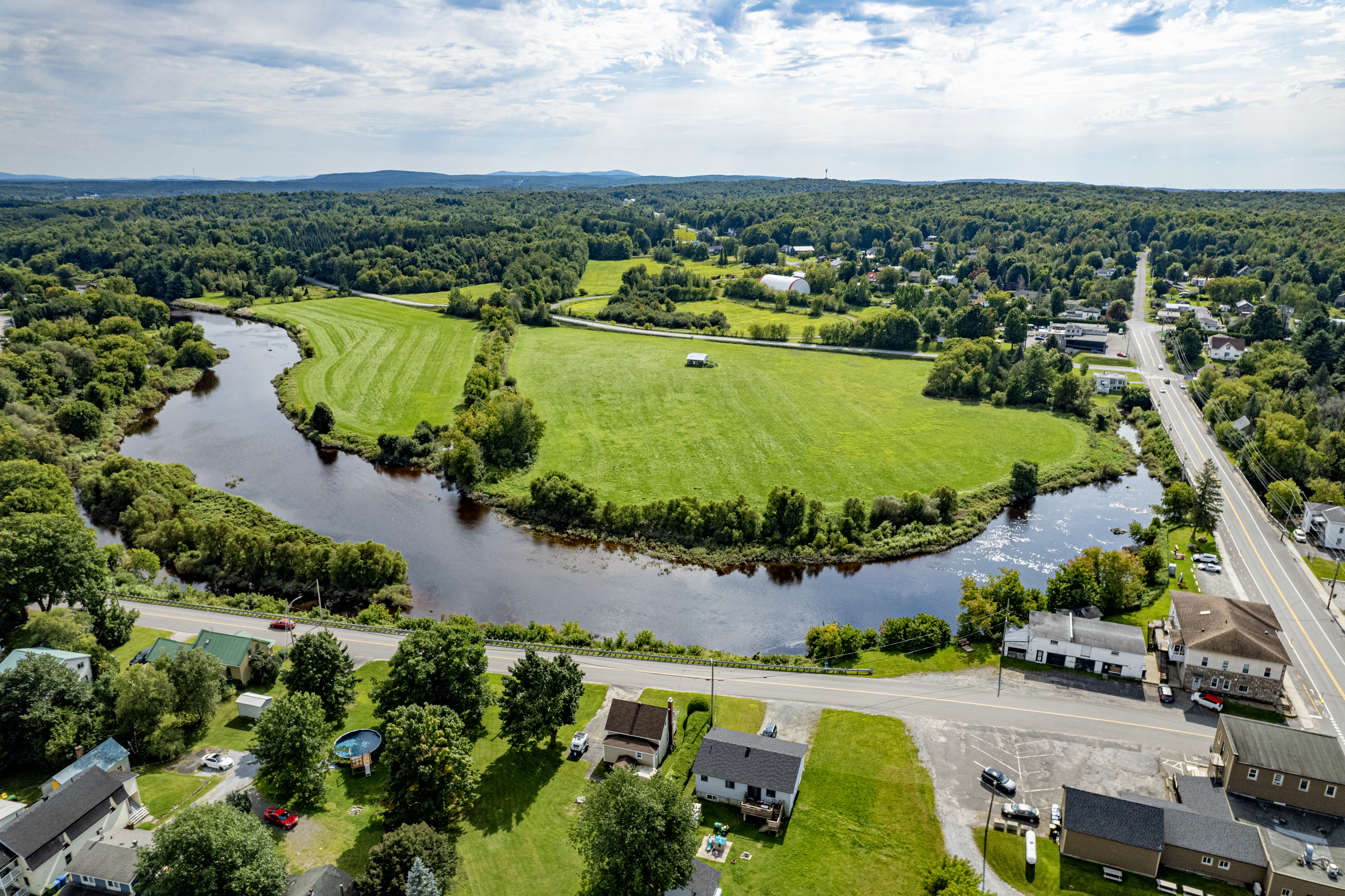
Noire River in Roxton Falls

Roxton falls is highlighted by a split on the Noire River which surrounds a small island, causing two nine meter falls. Even though the whole area used to by mostly marshy, it was slowly reclaimed by inhabitants of the village since the 1900s.

== History ==
Before European activity even began in the area, it is rumoured that Abenaki Indians used to use the falls as a meeting point for trade, and possibly even had a camp at the foot of the falls.

In 1792, after the government of Lower Canada started making districts from the lands south of the Saint Laurence and east of the Richelieu River, the area of Roxton was supposedly named after Roxton, Bedfordshire in England. The village at Roxton Falls was initially called Metcalfe, until the municipality of Roxton Falls pulled from Roxton.

The area remained mostly uninhabited until the first mayor of Roxton Falls, from 1863 was John Wood, a leather tanner who had moved to that area in 1851. He was mayor until 1880, followed by Joseph Lafontaine.

Because abundance of Eastern Hemlock whose bark is used for tanning in the area, one of the primary productions of the village in the 1860s was leather, specifically sole leather. Two tanneries existed in the village, the Shaw and the Wood Tanneries, but the industry was mostly dominated by the Shaw Brothers' enterprise. In1871, Roxton Falls was one of the few cities with any notable industrial output in Quebec, ranking with cities like Sherbrook, Levis, and St-John.

As tanning began to die out, it was replaced by a sawmill. The sawmill was powered by the energy of the falls, and was built in the same location as the Shaw Tannery. This industry, operated by the Larivière family, ran from 1906 to 1986. Because of the water falls, hydro-electric powerplants where installed on the river under the supervision of "The Roxton Electric Light & Power Co." in the 1920s.

The sawmill ran thanks to the power of the water falls, which was enhanced in the 1920s by wood dams. These dams however, where soon replaced by concrete ones. The east dam was damaged by torrential rain in 1972, and was never repaired. The remains of the dam, as well as some of the equipment from the sawmill, can be seen from the Larivière Parc, which was constructed on the same site as the old mill.

== Demographics ==
In the 2021 Census of Population conducted by Statistics Canada, Roxton Falls had a population of 1,322 living in 615 of its 641 total private dwellings, a change of 1.3% from its 2016 population of 1,305. With a land area of 4.94 km^{2} (1.91 sq mi), it had a population density of 267.6/km^{2} (693.1/sq mi) in 2021.

Population trend:

Census	Population	Change (%)
2011	1,265	▼3.1%
2006	1,305	▲0.4%
2001	1,300	▼5.2%
1996	1,371	▲2.6%
1991	1,336	N/A

Mother tongue language (2006)

Language	Population	Pct (%)
French only	1,305	99.24%
English only	0	0.00%
Both English and French	0	0.00%
Other languages	10	0.76%

== See also ==
- List of village municipalities in Quebec
