= Quebec Route 220 =

Highway in Quebec, Canada

Route 220

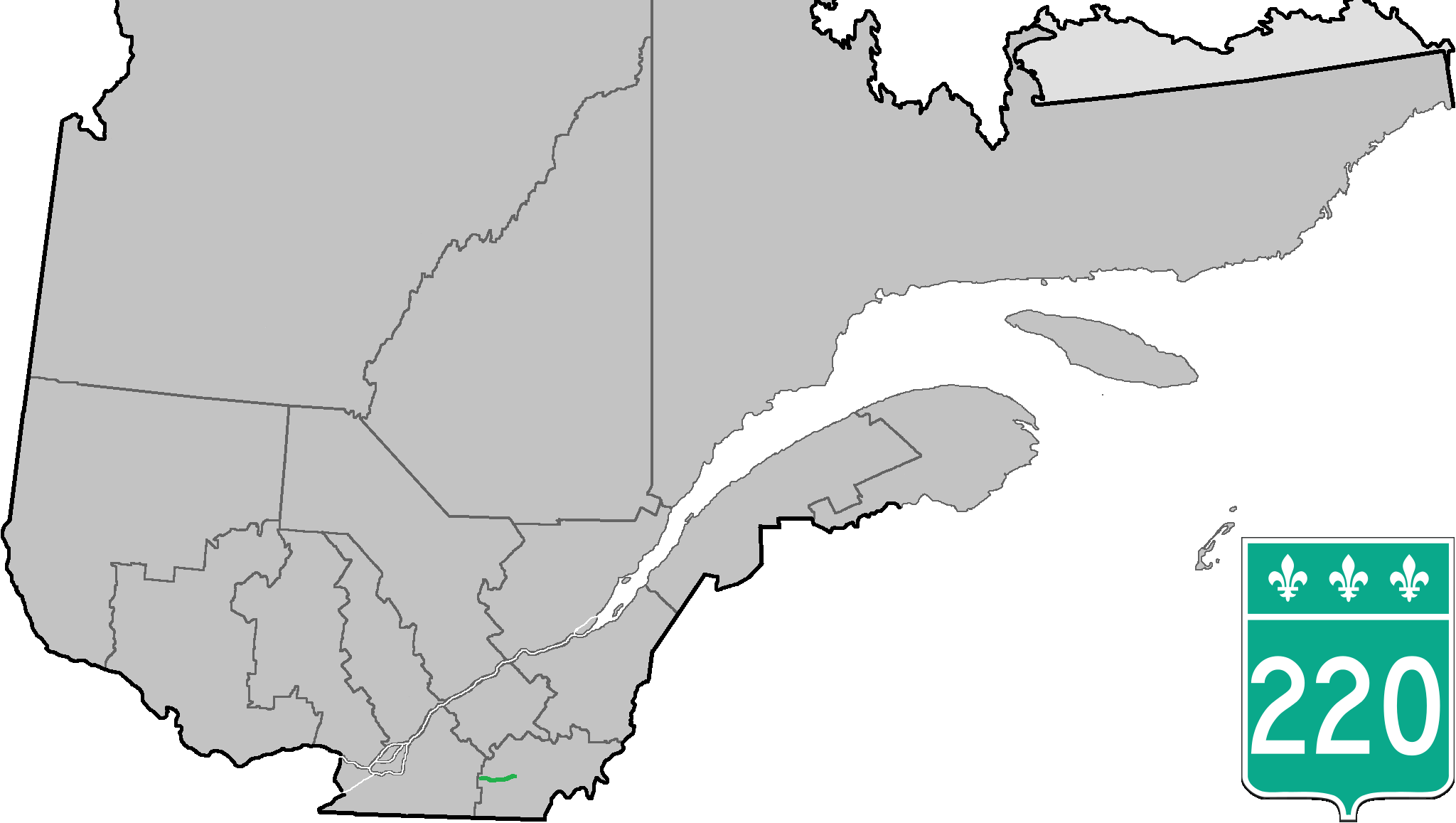

Route information
- Maintained by Transports Québec
- Length: 36.9 km (22.9 mi)

Major junctions
- West end: R-243 in Sainte-Anne-de-la-Rochelle
- A-10 / A-55 / R-249 in Saint-Élie-d'Orford
- East end: A-410 in Sherbrooke

Location
- Country: Canada
- Province: Quebec

Highway system
- Quebec provincial highways; Autoroutes; List; Former
← R-219	→ R-221

Route 220 is a provincial highway located in the Estrie region of Quebec. The highway runs from Sainte-Anne-de-la-Rochelle at the junction of Route 243 and ends west of downtown Sherbrooke at Autoroute 410. The road connects the northern section of the Mont Orford Park.

== Municipalities along Route 220 ==
- Sainte-Anne-de-la-Rochelle
- Bonsecours
- Orford
- Sherbrooke (Rock Forest–Saint-Élie–Deauville)
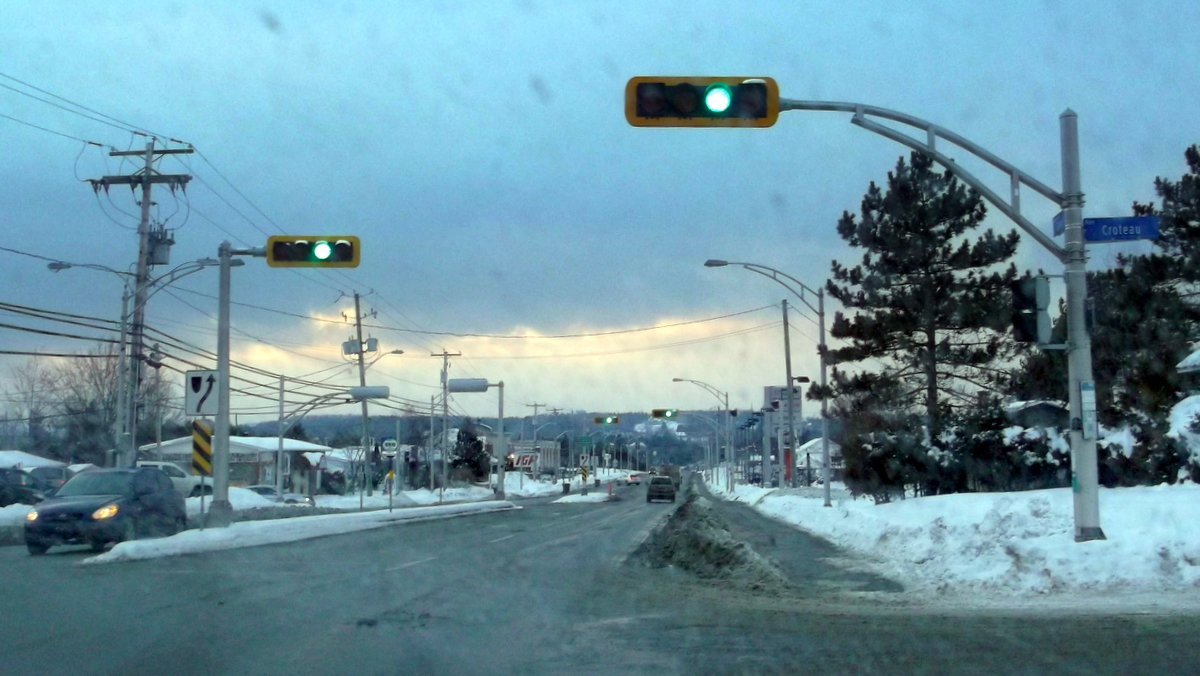
Saint-Élie Road in Sherbrooke.

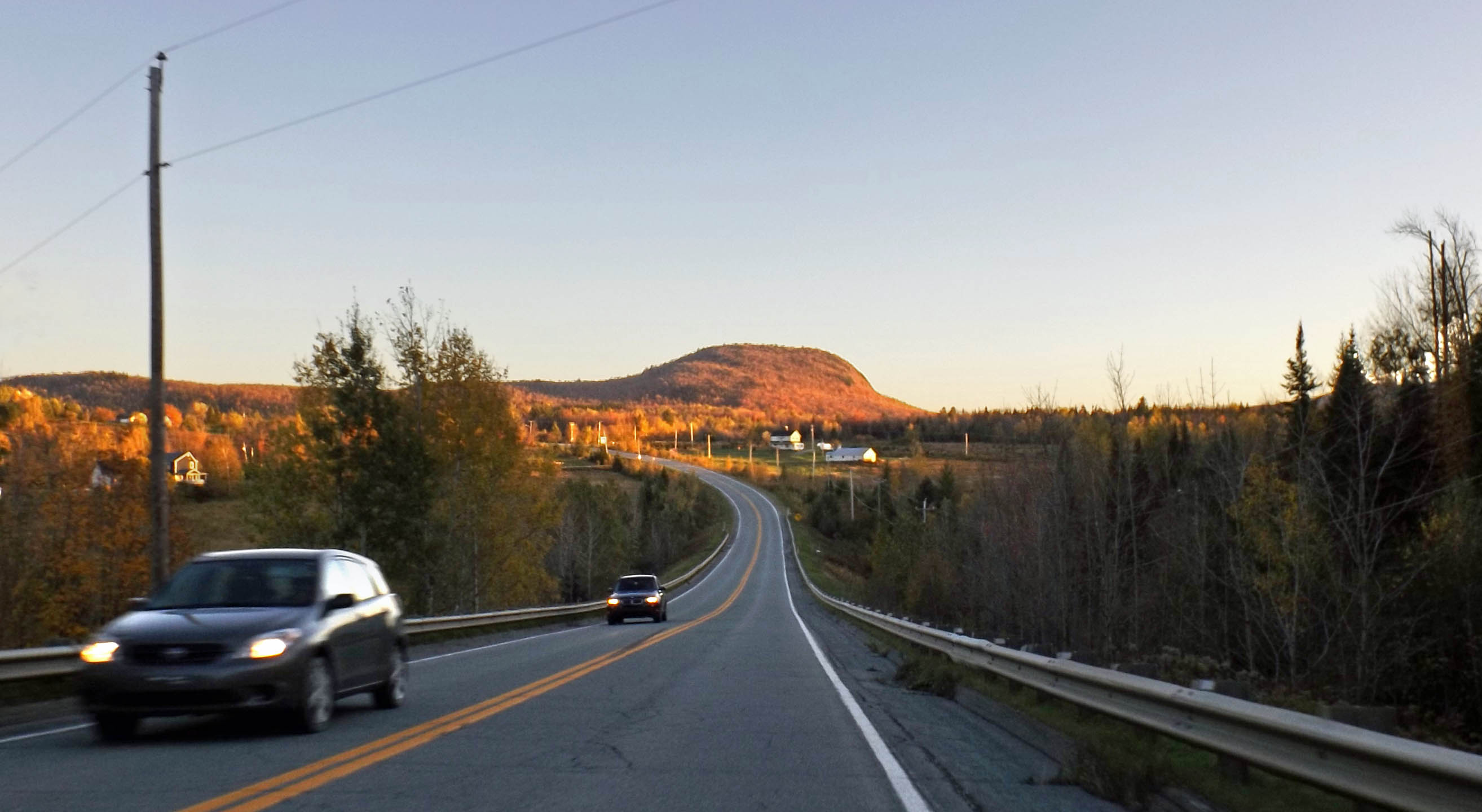
Route 220 at Orford.

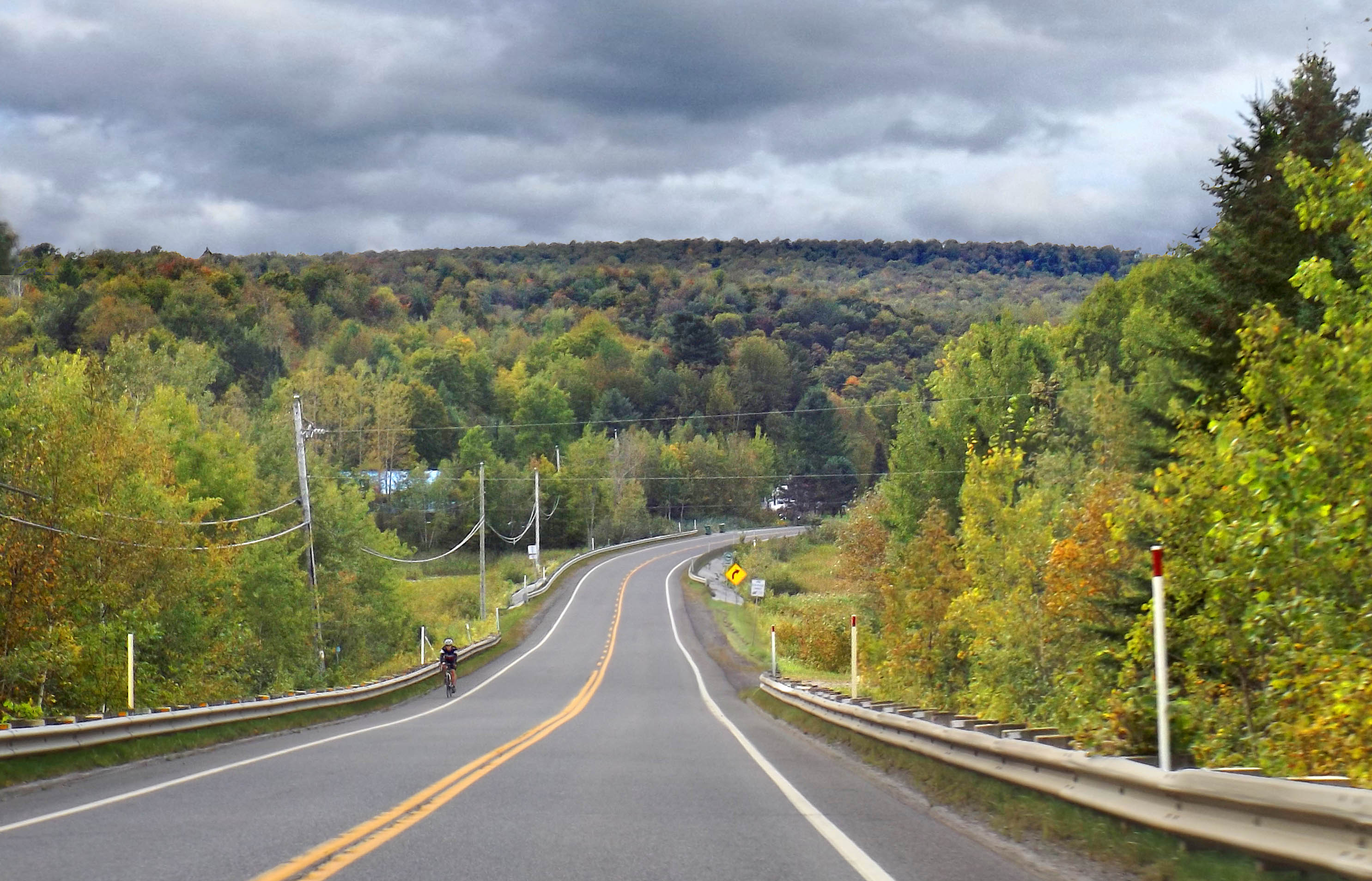
Route 220 near Lake Brompton.

== See also ==
- List of Quebec provincial highways
