= Saint-Pie =

- City
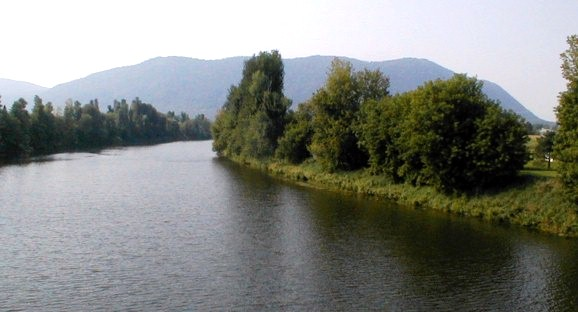
- Riviere Noire

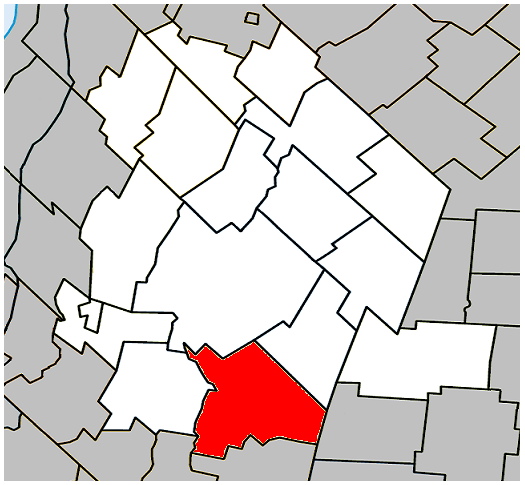
- Location within Les Maskoutains RCM

- Location in southern Quebec
- Coordinates: 45°30′N 72°54′W
- Country: Canada
- Province: Quebec
- Region: Montérégie
- RCM: Les Maskoutains
- Constituted: February 28, 2003

Government
  - Mayor: Mario St-Pierre
  - Federal riding: Saint-Hyacinthe—Bagot—Acton
  - Prov. riding: Daniel-Johnson

Area
  - Total: 108.60 km^{2} (41.93 sq mi)
  - Land: 107.42 km^{2} (41.48 sq mi)

Population (2021)
  - Total: 5,847
  - Density: 54.4/km^{2} (141/sq mi)
  - Pop (2016-2021): ▲4.3%
  - Dwellings: 2,511
- Time zone: UTC−5 (EST)
  - Summer (DST): UTC−4 (EDT)
- Postal code(s): J0H
- Area codes: 450 and 579
- Highways: R-231; R-233; R-235
- Website: www.villest-pie.ca

Saint-Pie (French pronunciation: [sɛ̃ pi]) is a city in the Montérégie region of southwest Quebec. The population as of the Canada 2021 Census was 5,847. Saint-Pie is best known for its furniture industry. It is also sometimes nicknamed the “Furniture Capital of Quebec”. The city is named after Pope Pius V, pope from 1566 to 1572, notable for his role in the Council of Trent, the Counter-Reformation, and the standardization of the Roman Rite within the Latin Church, known as Tridentine mass.

The former parish municipality of Saint-Pie was amalgamated into the City of Saint-Pie on February 28, 2003.

== Demographics ==
Historical Census Data - Saint-Pie, Quebec
Year	Pop.	±%
1911	768	—
1921	960	+25.0%
1931	858	−10.6%
1941	1,009	+17.6%
1951	1,182	+17.1%
1956	1,228	+3.9%
1961	1,434	+16.8%
1966	1,652	+15.2%
1971	1,709	+3.5%
1976	1,720	+0.6%
1981	1,725	+0.3%
1986	1,739	+0.8%
1991	2,083	+19.8%
1996	2,249	+8.0%
2001	2,396	+6.5%
2006	5,109	+113.2%
2011	5,438	+6.4%
2016	5,607	+3.1%
2021	5,847	+4.3%
(M) merger with Parish of Saint-Pie on February 28, 2003.

In the 2021 Census of Population conducted by Statistics Canada, Saint-Pie had a population of 5,847 living in 2,413 of its 2,511 total private dwellings, a change of 4.3% from its 2016 population of 5,607. With a land area of 107.42 km^{2} (41.48 sq mi), it had a population density of 54.4/km^{2} (141.0/sq mi) in 2021.

Canada census – Saint-Pie community profile

	2021	2016	2011
Population	5,847 (+4.3% from 2016)	5,607 (+3.1% from 2011)	5,438 (+6.4% from 2006)
Land area	107.42 km^{2} (41.48 sq mi)	107.49 km^{2} (41.50 sq mi)	109.03 km^{2} (42.10 sq mi)
Population density	54.4/km^{2} (141/sq mi)	52.2/km^{2} (135/sq mi)	49.9/km^{2} (129/sq mi)
Median age	40 (M: 40.4, F: 39.6)	39.4 (M: 40.1, F: 38.7)	38.8 (M: 39.1, F: 38.4)
Private dwellings	2,415 (total)	2,475 (total)	2,319 (total)
Median household income		$63,232	$53,639

Notes: Amalgamated with Parish of Saint-Pie on February 28, 2003.
References: 2021 2016 2011

Canada Census Mother Tongue - Saint-Pie, Quebec
Census	Total	French			English			French & English			Other		
Year	Responses	Count	Trend	Pop %	Count	Trend	Pop %	Count	Trend	Pop %	Count	Trend	Pop %
2021	5,845	5,645	▲3.3%	96.6%	45	▲50.0%	0.8%	40	▲166.7%	0.7%	110	▲46.7%	1.9%
2016	5,605	5,465	▲2.8%	97.5%	30	0.0%	0.5%	15	0.0%	0.3%	75	▲114.3%	1.3%
2011	5,395	5,315	▲6.6%	98.5%	30	▼62.5%	0.6%	15	▲50.0%	0.3%	35	▲133.3%	0.7%
2006	5,090	4,985	▲113.5%	97.9%	80	▲433.3%	1.6%	10	▲ n/a%	0.2%	15	▲50.0%	0.3%
2001	2,360	2,335	▲6.9%	98.9%	15	0.0%	0.6%	0	▼100.0%	0.0%	10	▼60.0%	0.4%
1996	2,235	2,185	n/a	97.8%	15	n/a	0.7%	10	n/a	0.5%	25	n/a	1.1%

== See also ==
- List of cities in Quebec
