= Bonsecours, Quebec =

Bonsecours
- Municipality
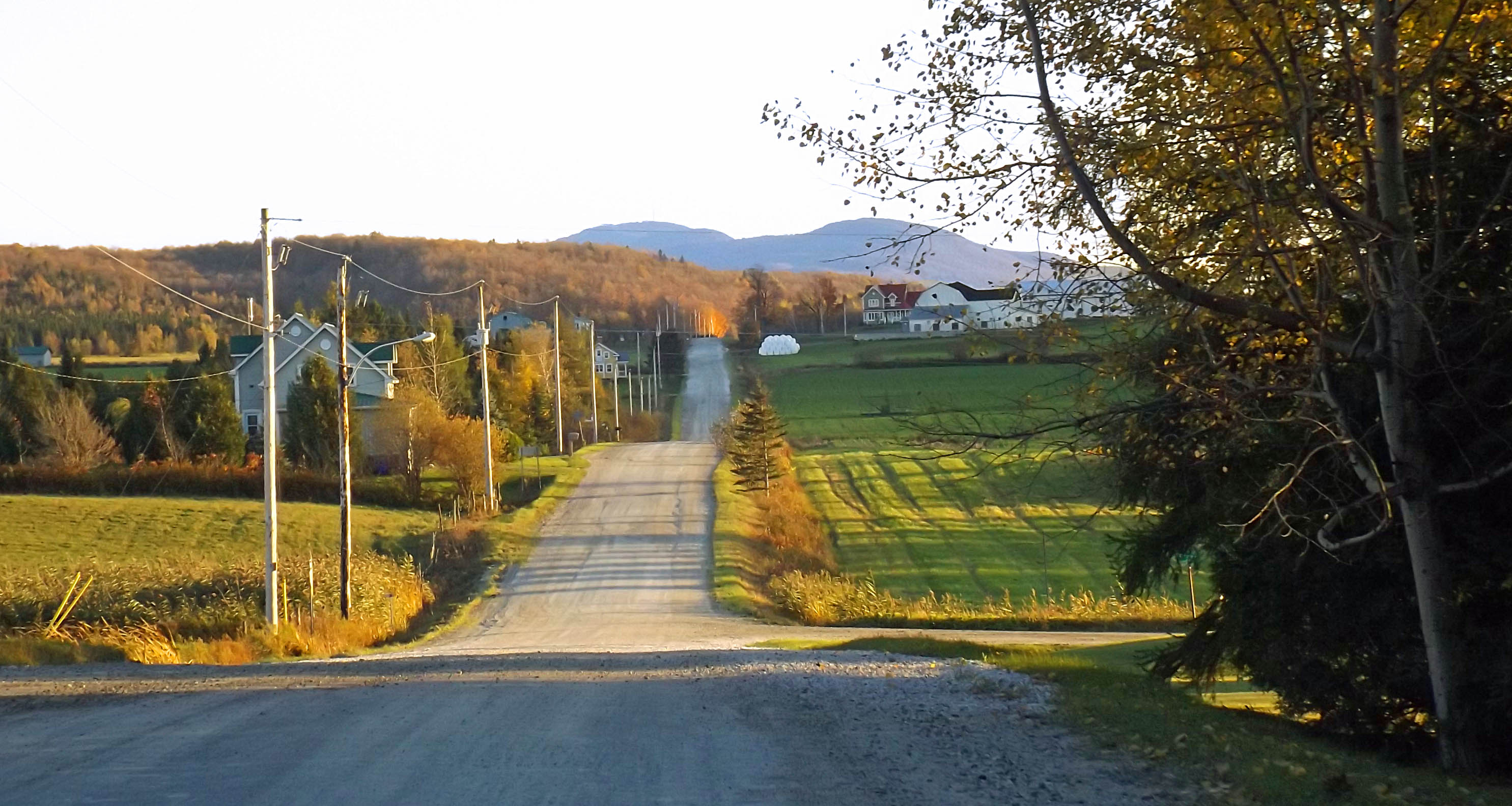

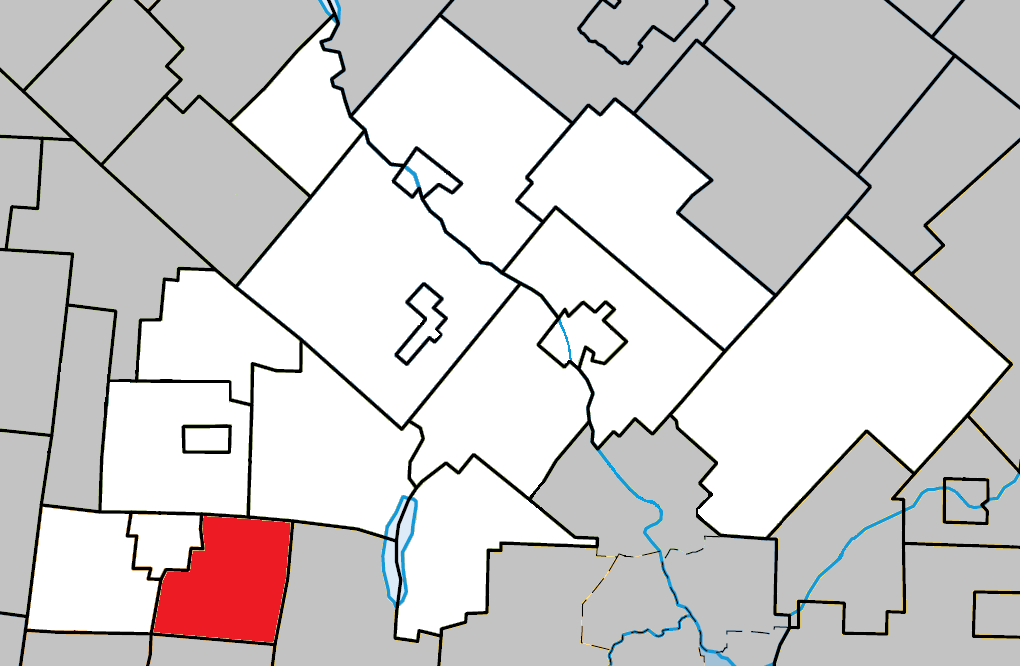
- Location within Le Val-Saint-François RCM

- Location in southern Quebec
- Coordinates: 45°25′N 72°17′W
- Country: Canada
- Province: Quebec
- Region: Estrie
- RCM: Le Val-Saint-François
- Constituted: March 20, 1905

Government
  - Mayor: Alex Bouthillette
  - Federal riding: Shefford
  - Prov. riding: Daniel-Johnson

Area
  - Total: 61.20 km^{2} (23.63 sq mi)
  - Land: 60.46 km^{2} (23.34 sq mi)

Population (2016)
  - Total: 608
  - Density: 10.1/km^{2} (26/sq mi)
  - Pop 2011-2016: ▲5.4%
  - Dwellings: 319
- Time zone: UTC−5 (EST)
  - Summer (DST): UTC−4 (EDT)
- Postal code(s): J0E 1H0
- Area codes: 450 and 579
- Highways: R-220
- Website: www.bonsecours.ca

Bonsecours (French pronunciation: [bɔ̃səkuʁ]) is a municipality in Le Val-Saint-François Regional County Municipality in the Estrie region of Quebec, Canada.

== Demographics ==
=== Population ===
Historical Census Data - Bonsecours, Quebec
| Year | Pop. | ±% |
|---|---|---|
| 1991 | 491 | — |
| 1996 | 503 | +2.4% |
| 2001 | 537 | +6.8% |
| 2006 | 547 | +1.9% |
| 2011 | 577 | +5.5% |
| 2016 | 608 | +5.4% |

=== Language ===
Mother tongue (2011)

| Language | Population | Pct (%) |
|---|---|---|
| French only | 555 | 95.7% |
| English only | 20 | 3.4% |
| Non-official languages | 5 | 0.9% |

== See also ==
- List of municipalities in Quebec
