= Sainte-Anne-de-la-Rochelle =

- Municipality
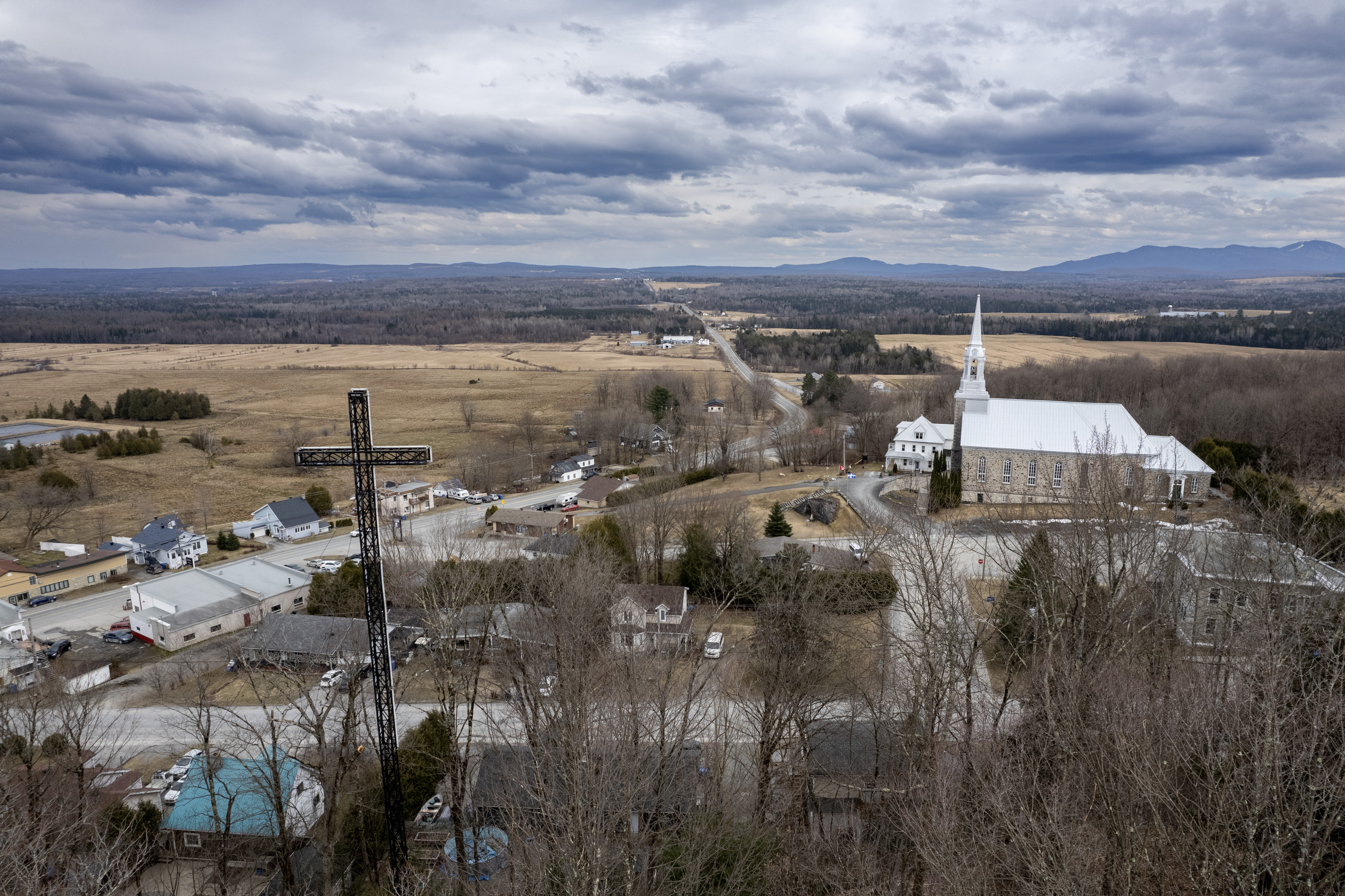

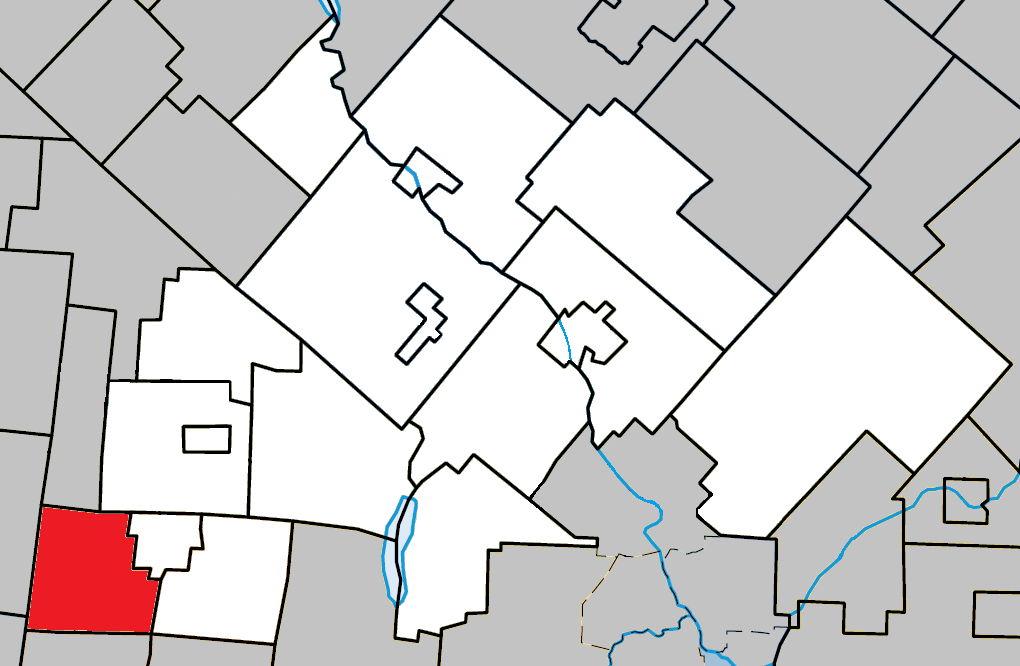
- Location within Le Val-Saint-François RCM.

- Location in southern Quebec.
- Coordinates: 45°24′N 72°24′W
- Country: Canada
- Province: Quebec
- Region: Estrie
- RCM: Le Val-Saint-François
- Constituted: July 1, 1855

Government
  - Mayor: Louis Coutu
  - Federal riding: Shefford
  - Prov. riding: Daniel-Johnson

Area
  - Total: 62.00 km^{2} (23.94 sq mi)
  - Land: 61.86 km^{2} (23.88 sq mi)

Population (2021)
  - Total: 625
  - Density: 10.1/km^{2} (26/sq mi)
  - Pop 2016-2021: ▲4.5%
  - Dwellings: 277
- Time zone: UTC−5 (EST)
  - Summer (DST): UTC−4 (EDT)
- Postal code(s): J0E 2B0
- Area codes: 450 and 579
- Highways: R-220; R-243
- Website: www.steanne delarochelle.ca

Sainte-Anne-de-la-Rochelle (French pronunciation: [sɛ̃t an də la ʁɔʃɛl]) is a community in Quebec, Canada, situated within the Regional County Municipality of Le Val-Saint-François in the administrative region of Estrie.

It is served by Quebec Routes 243 and 220. Route 220 has its beginning point in Sainte-Anne-de-la-Rochelle.

== Demographics ==
=== Population ===
Historical Census Data - Sainte-Anne-de-la-Rochelle, Quebec

Year	Pop.	±%
1991	571	—
1996	644	+12.8%
2001	637	−1.1%

Year	Pop.	±%
2006	642	+0.8%
2011	611	−4.8%
2016	598	−2.1%

Year	Pop.	±%
2021	625	+4.5%

=== Language ===
Mother tongue (2011)

Language	Population	Pct (%)
French only	585	95.9%
English only	25	4.1%

== See also ==
- List of municipalities in Quebec
