= Lawrenceville, Quebec =

Lawrenceville
- Village municipality
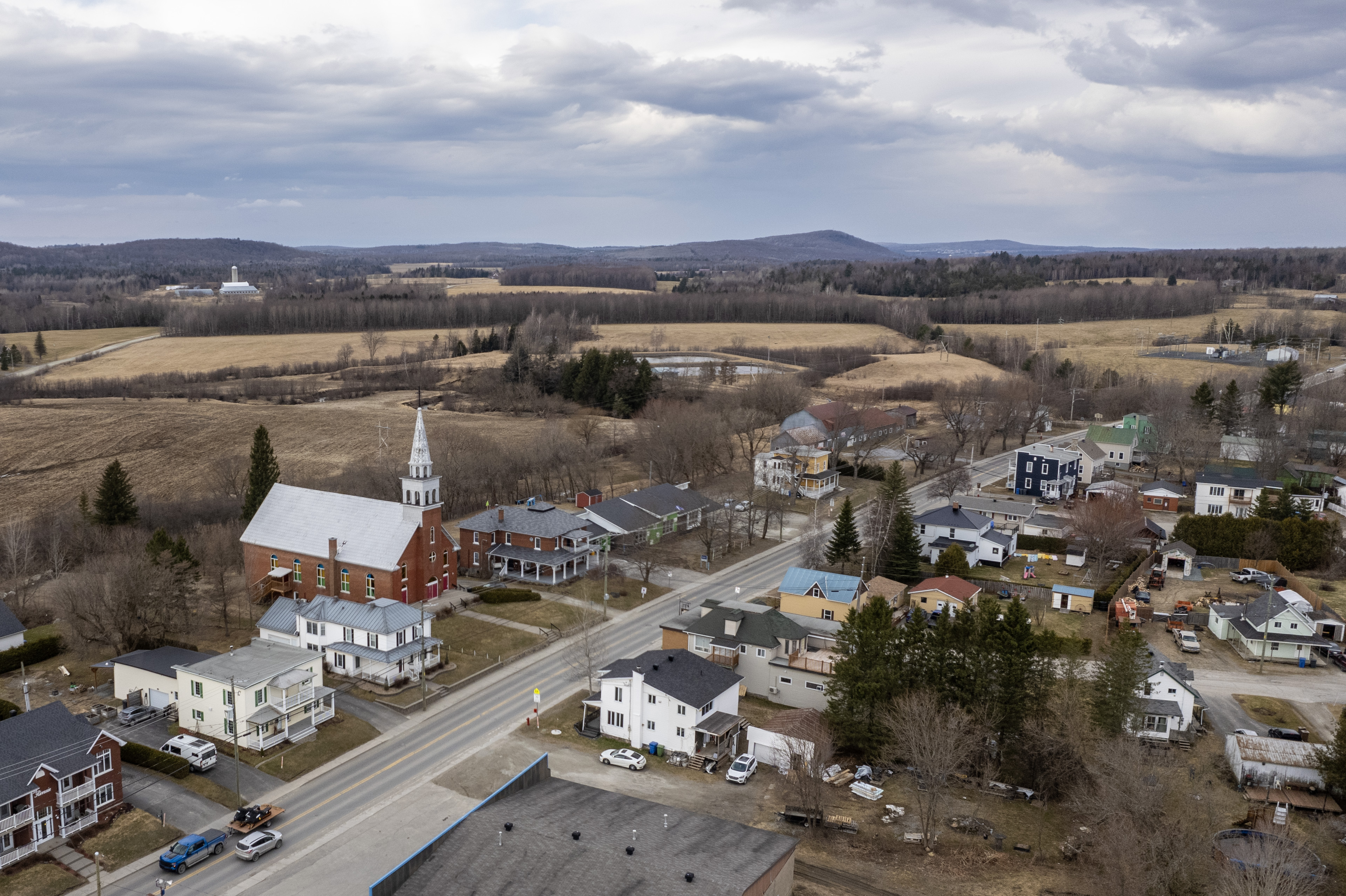

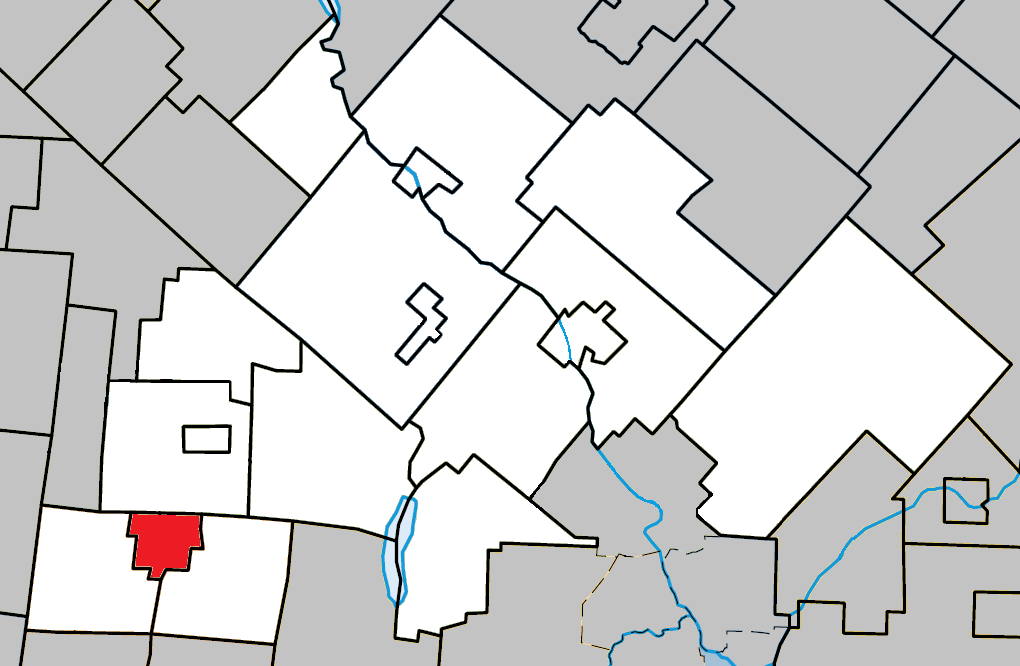
- Location within Le Val-Saint-François RCM

- Location in southern Quebec
- Coordinates: 45.42°N 72.35°W
- Country: Canada
- Province: Quebec
- Region: Estrie
- RCM: Le Val-Saint-François
- Constituted: April 27, 1905

Government
  - Mayor: Éric Bossé
  - Federal riding: Shefford
  - Prov. riding: Daniel-Johnson

Area
  - Total: 17.20 km^{2} (6.64 sq mi)
  - Land: 17.32 km^{2} (6.69 sq mi)
- There is an apparent contradiction between two authoritative sources

Population (2011)
  - Total: 652
  - Density: 37.7/km^{2} (98/sq mi)
  - Pop 2006-2011: ▲1.6%
  - Dwellings: 285
- Time zone: UTC−5 (EST)
  - Summer (DST): UTC−4 (EDT)
- Postal code(s): J0E 1W0
- Area codes: 450 and 579
- Highways: R-243
- Census profile: 2442045
- MAMROT info: 42045
- Toponymie info: 34934

Lawrenceville is a village municipality in the Le Val-Saint-François Regional County Municipality in the Estrie region of Quebec, Canada.

It is situated west of Sherbrooke, near the Black River. Around 650 Lawrence villagers live in an area of 17 square kilometres.

== History ==
The name of the village honours Mr. Henry Lawrence, son of Isaac Lawrence, who originally came from Canaan, Connecticut, and moved to Shefford Township in 1794 settling his family near Lake Waterloo between Fulford and Waterloo. In 1800, the Township of Stukely was created, and Henry and his brother Erastus became Samuel Willard's associates, and both moved to South Stukely in 1804. Erastus died eight years later. In 1836 Henry Lawrence moved to the northern part of Stukely and built a sawmill and flourmill on an island, which became part of Lawrenceville, although the Village of Lawrenceville was not constituted until 1905 by detachment of the municipality from the township of North-Stukely. Only remains of the building can still be found on Henry's Island, but two dwellings still exist: dating from the 19th century, that is the Island Park House of Victorian style and another house, with a double-slope roof.

Henry died in 1864, surviving his first wife, Polly Day, daughter of Pelatiah and Hannah (Curtis) Day. He remarried to Elizabeth Lewis, daughter of the precursor of Waterloo, Captain Ezekiel Lewis, and his wife, Abigail Gibbs.

== Demographics ==
Historical Census Data - Lawrenceville, Quebec
Year	Pop.	±%
1991	612	—
1996	666	+8.8%
2001	629	−5.6%
2006	642	+2.1%
2011	652	+1.6%

In the 2021 Census of Population conducted by Statistics Canada, Lawrenceville had a population of 618 living in 283 of its 295 total private dwellings, a change of −2.7% from its 2016 population of 635. With a land area of 16.73 km^{2} (6.46 sq mi), it had a population density of 36.9/km^{2} (95.7/sq mi) in 2021.

Mother tongue (2011)

Language	Population	Pct (%)
French only	640	97.0%
English only	10	1.5%
Both English and French	5	0.75%
Non-official languages	5	0.75%

== See also ==
- List of village municipalities in Quebec
