= Duncan River (rivière le Renne tributary) =

River in Montérégie, Quebec, Canada

Location
- Country: Canada
- Province: Quebec
- Region: Montérégie
- Regional County Municipality: Acton Regional County Municipality

Physical characteristics
- Source: Various streams
  - location: Saint-Nazaire-d'Acton
  - coordinates: 45°44′42″N 72°41′02″W
  - elevation: 80 m (260 ft)
- Mouth: Noire River (Yamaska River tributary)
  - location: Upton
  - coordinates: 45.65611°N 72.68056°W
  - elevation: 57 m (187 ft)
- Length: 20.9 km (13.0 mi)

Basin features
- Tributaries
  - left: (Upstream) 2th ruisseau Picard, 1e ruisseau Picard, ruisseau Lecler, cours d'eau du Huitième et Neuvième Rangs, le Petit Ruisseau, décharge des 9e 10e et 11e concessions.
  - right: (Upstream) cours d'eau Martial-Savoie, ruisseau Marie, ruisseau J.-A.-Duff.

The Duncan River is a tributary of the rivière le Renne, which flows in the municipalities of Saint-Germain-de-Grantham (a sector of Drummondville), Saint-Nazaire-d'Acton, Saint-Théodore-d'Acton and Upton, in the Acton Regional County Municipality (MRC), in Montérégie, on the South Shore of the Saint Lawrence River, in Quebec, Canada.

== Geography ==
The main neighboring hydrographic slopes of the Duncan River are:

- north side: rivière aux Vaches;
- east side: Saint-Germain River;
- south side: rivière le Renne;
- west side: David River, Yamaska River.

The Duncan River draws its sources to the south of a marsh area (length of 1.2 km [0.75 mi]) in the south-eastern part of the territory of Saint-Germain-de-Grantham, near the limit of the municipality of Wickham.

From its head, the Duncan River flows entirely in an agricultural zone on:

- 1.8 km (1.1 mi) south, in Saint-Germain-de-Grantham to the route de la Grande-Ligne;
- 2.4 km (1.5 mi) south in range XII of township of Wickham, to the Forcier road;
- 3.0 km (1.9 mi) to the southwest in range XII Acton and range XI of Saint-Théodore-d'Acton, until its confluence with the J.-A.-Duff stream;
- 1.5 km (0.93 mi) southwest in range XI to the tenth rang road that it crosses at the western limit of the village of Saint-Nazaire-d'Acton;
- 3.0 km (1.9 mi) south-west in range X of Saint-Théodore-d'Acton, up to brook Marie (coming from the north-west) which empties near the 9e rang road;
- 4.8 km (3.0 mi) to the south in range IX of Saint-Théodore-d'Acton, winding up to the Leclerc stream (coming from the east);
- 4.4 km (2.7 mi) to the south in range VIII and VII of Saint-Théodore-d'Acton, up to its mouth.

The Duncan River drains into a river bend on the north bank of the Reindeer River at Upton. The mouth of the Duncan River is located 4.6 km (2.9 mi) northeast of the village of Upton, 3.2 km (2.0 mi) north of route 116 and 3.7 km (2.3 mi) upstream from the mouth of the rivière le Renne.

== Toponymy ==
In the past, this watercourse was called the “Saint-Nazaire river”.

The toponym “Duncan River” was officially registered on July 9, 1980, at the Commission de toponymie du Québec.

== See also ==
- Yamaska River, a watercourse
- Noire River (Yamaska River tributary), a watercourse
- Rivière le Renne, a stream
- Saint-Germain-de-Grantham, a municipality
- Saint-Nazaire-d'Acton, a municipality
- Saint-Théodore-d'Acton, a municipality
- Upton, a municipality
- Acton Regional County Municipality (MRC)
- List of rivers of Quebec
