= Rivière le Renne =

River in Estrie, Quebec, Canada

Location
- Country: Canada
- Province: Quebec
- Region: Montérégie
- Regional County Municipality: Acton Regional County Municipality

Physical characteristics
- Source: Various streams
  - location: Saint-Théodore-d'Acton
  - coordinates: 46°34′26″N 72°16′51″W
  - elevation: 215 m (705 ft)
- Mouth: Yamaska River
  - location: Saint-Théodore-d'Acton
  - coordinates: 45.68111°N 72.64777°W
  - elevation: 55 m (180 ft)
- Length: 48 km (30 mi)

Basin features
- Tributaries
  - left: (Upstream) cours d'eau Clément-Gaudette, ruisseau Demers, ruisseau Landry, cours d'eau Dupuis, cours d'eau Gardin, cours d'eau Archambault, cours d'eau Rivard.
  - right: (Upstream) ruisseau Fontaine, Duncan River, ruisseau Savoie, cours d'eau Dumoulin, ruisseau Courtemanche, cours d'eau Daigneault, ruisseau Lefebvre, ruisseau Carrier, ruisseau Normand.

The rivière le Renne (English: Reindeer River) is a tributary of the Yamaska River, which flows in the municipalities of Maricourt, Sainte-Christine, Acton Vale, Saint-Nazaire-d'Acton, of Saint-Théodore-d'Acton, in the Acton Regional County Municipality (MRC), on the South Shore of the Saint Lawrence River, in Estrie, in Quebec, Canada.

== Geography ==
The main neighboring hydrographic slopes of the Renne river are:

- north side: David River, Duncan River;
- east side: Saint-François River;
- south side: Noire River;
- west side: Chibouet River.

The Renne river has its source in the Rivard stream, whose mouth is located northwest of the village of Maricourt.

Upper course of the river (segment of 24.6 kilometres (15.3 mi))

From its head, the Reindeer river flows over:

- 1.4 kilometres (0.87 mi) west to route 222;
- 2.9 kilometres (1.8 mi) west then north-west, to the confluence of a stream coming from the north-east;
- 3.0 kilometres (1.9 mi) north-west to route 222;
- 4.2 kilometres (2.6 mi) towards the north, collecting the waters of the Gardin stream (coming from the west), up to the road;
- 4.1 kilometres (2.5 mi) northwesterly, to route 116;
- 4.1 kilometres (2.5 mi) towards the north-west, collecting the waters of the Normand stream (coming from the east) and the Dupuis stream (coming from the south), up to the road of iron;
- 4.9 kilometres (3.0 mi) towards the north-west, collecting the Normand, Dupuis, Gauthier, Landry, Lefebvre and Daigneault streams, up to the Courtemanche stream (coming from the north).

Lower course of the river (segment of 23.4 kilometres (14.5 mi))

From the mouth of Courtemanche brook, the river becomes wider (up to its mouth) and flows over:

- 8.9 kilometres (5.5 mi) westward, winding in segments, to the route 139 bridge, located east of the village of Acton Vale;
- 8.0 kilometres (5.0 mi) west, through the village of Acton Vale, to a road bridge;
- 2.8 kilometres (1.7 mi) northwesterly, winding in segments, to the mouth of the Duncan River;
- 3.7 kilometres (2.3 mi) towards the south-west, in an agricultural zone, to its mouth.

The Renne river flows on the north bank of the Black River (Yamaska River).

== Toponymy ==
Formerly, this stream was known as the "Moose River".

The toponym "Rivière le Renne" was officially registered on December 5, 1968, at the Commission de toponymie du Québec.

== See also ==
- List of rivers of Quebec
