= Chibouet River =

River in Estrie, Quebec, Canada

Location
- Country: Canada
- Province: Quebec
- Region: Montérégie
- Regional County Municipality: Les Maskoutains Regional County Municipality

Physical characteristics
- Source: Various agricol streams
  - location: Sainte-Hélène-de-Bagot
  - coordinates: 45°44′42″N 72°41′02″W
  - elevation: 73 m (240 ft)
- Mouth: Yamaska River
  - location: Saint-Hugues
  - coordinates: 45.78389°N 72.87305°W
  - elevation: 7 m (23 ft)
- Length: 36.9 km (22.9 mi)

Basin features
- Tributaries
  - left: (Upstream) décharge des Trois ou Cinq, ruisseau du Deuxième Rang, ruisseau Breault, ruisseau Bonin, ruisseau Lapierre, ruisseau Éphrem-Saint-Pierre, Arthur-Jodoin, Alexandre-Beaudet, Jodoin, Gilles Boucher, Desrosiers,
  - right: (Upstream) ruisseau Bras de Vis, ruisseau Lachance, ruisseau Lessard, Brunelle

The Chibouet river is a tributary of the Yamaska River. It flows north-east in the municipalities of Saint-Nazaire-d'Acton (MRC d 'Acton Regional County Municipality), Sainte-Hélène-de-Bagot and Saint-Hugues in the Les Maskoutains Regional County Municipality (MRC), in the administrative region of Montérégie, on the South Shore of Saint Lawrence River, in Quebec, Canada.

== Geography ==
The main neighboring hydrographic slopes of the Chibouet River are:

- North side: David River, stream number Three, Chènes stream;
- East side: Rivière le Renne, Duncan River;
- South side: Cournoyer-Lajoie stream, rivière La Cavée, rivière le Renne;
- West side: Yamaska River.

The Chibouet River originates from a set of agricultural streams draining the area of the hamlet of Royville, located west of the hamlet of Duncan, that is to say south of highway 20, in the municipality of Saint-Nazaire-d'Acton, in the Acton Regional County Municipality (MRC). This area is located to the south-east of the village of Sainte-Hélène-de-Bagot and to the west of the village of Saint-Nazaire-d'Acton.

Upper course south of highway 20 (segment of 10.8 kilometres (6.7 mi))

The Chibouet River begins at the confluence of Brunelle stream and Chicane stream in Rang Saint-Augustin in Saint-Nazaire-d'Acton, at 2.1 kilometres (1.3 mi) southeast of highway 20. At from this confluence, the river flows in an agricultural zone on:

- 3.2 kilometres (2.0 mi) south to the Gilas-Boucher stream;
- 2.9 kilometres (1.8 mi) southwesterly to rang Sainte-Hélène road;
- 4.7 kilometres (2.9 mi) north to Highway 20, which the river crosses at 1.1 kilometres (0.68 mi) west of the center of the village of Sainte-Hélène-de-Bagot.

Course north of highway 20 (19.4 kilometres (12.1 mi) segment)

From Highway 20, the Chibouet River flows over:

- 1.8 kilometres (1.1 mi) (or 1.5 kilometres (0.93 mi) in a direct line) north to the 3e rang road;
- 6.9 kilometres (4.3 mi) (or 2.9 kilometres (1.8 mi) in a direct line) towards the north, meandering through an agricultural zone to the Lachance stream (coming from the east);
- 0.7 kilometres (0.43 mi) north-west to the Belval stream;
- 10.0 kilometres (6.2 mi) (or 4.5 kilometres (2.8 mi) in a direct line) north-west winding up to the third rang road.

Course west of chemin du 3e rang (segment of 6.7 kilometres (4.2 mi))

From the 3e rang road, the Chibouet river flows over:

- 2.0 kilometres (1.2 mi) (or 1.2 kilometres (0.75 mi) in a direct line) towards the west, winding up to the 2th rang stream;
- 0.9 kilometres (0.56 mi) (or 0.6 kilometres (0.37 mi) in a direct line) towards the west while winding until discharge of the Three or Five;
- 1.4 kilometres (0.87 mi) (or 0.8 kilometres (0.50 mi) in a direct line) westward by winding up to route 224;
- 2.4 kilometres (1.5 mi) (or 1.7 kilometres (1.1 mi) in a direct line) towards the west, passing the south side of the village of Saint-Hugues and winding up to its mouth.

The Chibouet River empties on the east bank of the Yamaska River, at 1.0 kilometre (0.62 mi) downstream from the mouth of the Dix-Huit stream (coming from the east), at 5.3 kilometres (3.3 mi) downstream of the mouth of the rivière La Cavée (coming from the east) and at 1.2 kilometres (0.75 mi) upstream of the outlet (coming from the north-est) of Lac Pelletier.

== Toponymy ==
The old name of this river was "Sciebouette".

The toponym "Rivière Chibouet" was officially registered on December 5, 1968, at the Commission de toponymie du Québec.

== See also ==
- Yamaska River, a watercourse
- Rivière le Renne, a stream
- Saint-Hugues, a municipality
- Sainte-Hélène-de-Bagot, a municipality
- Saint-Nazaire-d'Acton, a municipality
- Acton Regional County Municipality (MRC)
- List of rivers of Quebec
