= Petite rivière Noire =

River in Centre-du-Québec, Quebec, Canada

Location
- Country: Canada
- Province: Quebec
- Region: Centre-du-Québec
- Regional County Municipality: Drummond Regional County Municipality

Physical characteristics
- Source: Various agricultural streams
  - location: Saint-Bonaventure
  - coordinates: 45°57′54″N 72°39′26″W
  - elevation: 58 m (190 ft)
- Mouth: Saint-François River
  - location: Saint-Pie-de-Guire
  - coordinates: 46.01444°N 72.68305°W
  - elevation: 18 m (59 ft)
- Length: 7.9 km (4.9 mi)

Basin features
- Tributaries
  - left: (Upstream) ruisseau Georges Lemaire
  - right: (Upstream)

The Petite rivière Noire (in English: Little Black River) is a tributary of the Saint-François River. It flows north-west through the municipalities of Saint-Bonaventure and Saint-Pie-de-Guire, in the regional county municipality (MRC) of Drummond Regional County Municipality, in the administrative region of Centre-du-Québec, on the South Shore of the Saint Lawrence River, in Quebec, Canada.

== Geography ==
The main neighboring hydrographic slopes of the "Little Black River" are:

- north side: Saint-François River;
- east side: Saint-François River, Joseph-Paul Hus stream;
- south side: rivière aux Vaches;
- west side: rivière aux Vaches, Georges-Lemaire stream.

The Little Black River has its source in a small forest area east of the village of Saint-Bonaventure, at 1.5 kilometres (0.93 mi) southeast of rue Principale, at 1.6 kilometres (0.99 mi) southwest of the Saint-François River and northwest of the city of Drummondville. This headland is located in the "Grantham-Ouest" sector, north of highway 20 and west of the town of Drummondville.

From its source, the river flows on 5.9 kilometres (3.7 mi) towards the northwest until the confluence of the Georges-Lemaire stream; on 2.0 kilometres (1.2 mi) north to its mouth.

The "Petite Rivière Noire" flows on the west bank of the Saint-François River in a zone of rapids, downstream from "Le Trou-d'Abraham" and upstream from "Rapides au Bélier".

== Toponymy ==
The toponym "Petite rivière Noire" was officially registered on December 5, 1968, at the Commission de toponymie du Québec.

== See also ==
- List of rivers of Quebec
