= Rivière aux Vaches =

River in Centre-du-Québec, Quebec, Canada

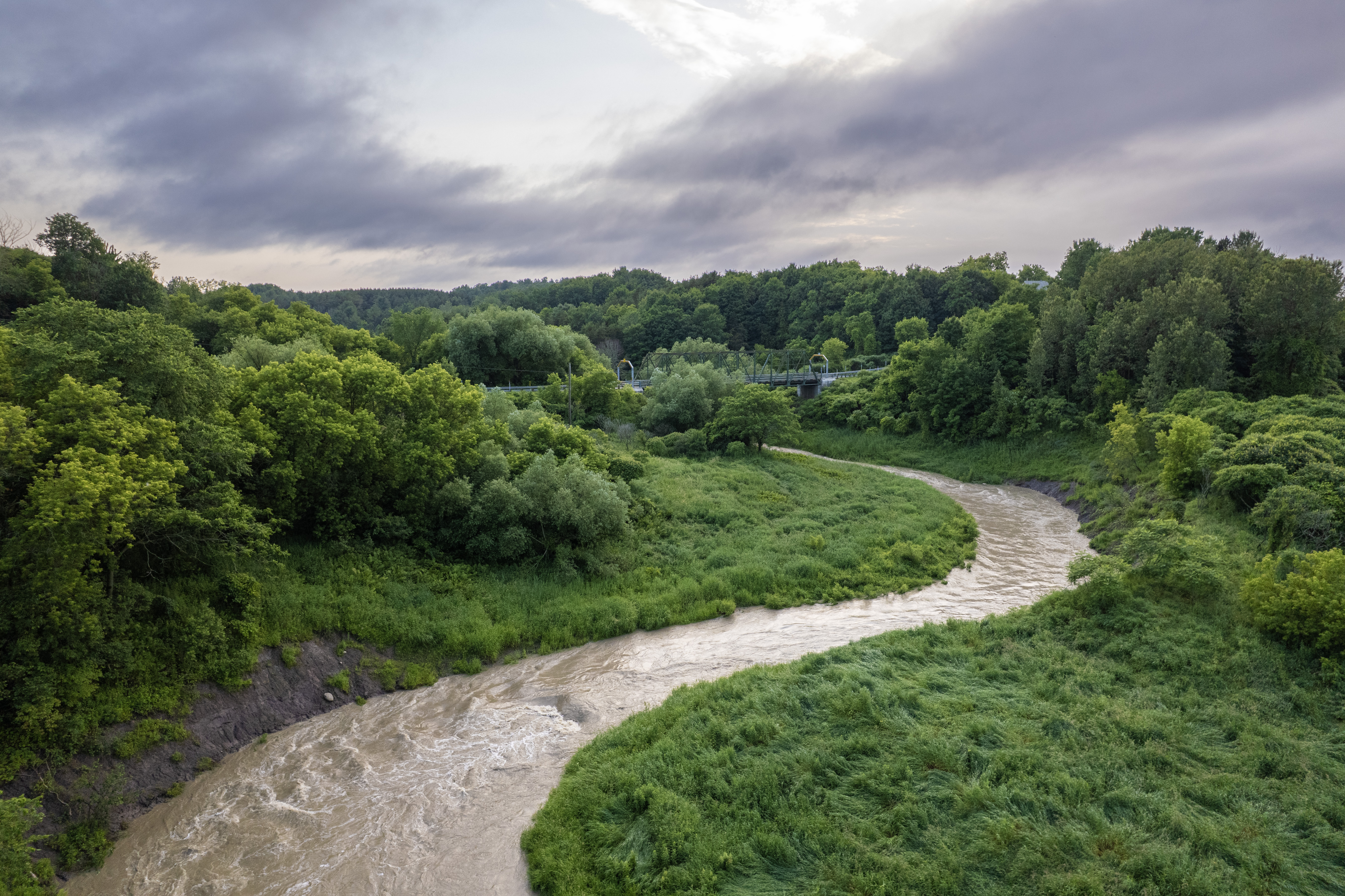

Location
- Country: Canada
- Province: Quebec
- Region: Centre-du-Québec
- Regional County Municipality: Drummond Regional County Municipality and Nicolet-Yamaska Regional County Municipality

Physical characteristics
- Source: Various agricultural streams
  - location: Drummondville
  - coordinates: 45°53′46″N 72°31′45″W
  - elevation: 86 m (282 ft)
- Mouth: Saint-François River
  - location: Saint-François-du-Lac
  - coordinates: 46.035°N 72.77277°W
  - elevation: 69 m (226 ft)
- Length: 33.9 km (21.1 mi)

Basin features
- Tributaries
  - left: (Upstream) ruisseau Pékasso, cours d'eau Georges-Côté, décharge des Vingt, ruisseau Labonté, ruisseau Allard.
  - right: (Upstream) cours d'eau Crevier, ruisseau Turmel, ruisseau Thibault-Salvas, ruisseau des Seize Arpents, ruisseau Léopold-Joyal, décharge des Dix.

The rivière aux Vaches is a tributary of the Saint-François River. It flows northwest in the administrative region of Centre-du-Québec, on the South Shore of the Saint Lawrence River, in Quebec, Canada, crossing the municipalities of:

- MRC of Drummond Regional County Municipality: town of Drummondville ("Grantham-Ouest" sector) and the municipalities of Saint-Majorique-de-Grantham, Saint-Bonaventure, Saint-Pie-de-Guire, Saint-François-du-Lac;
- MRC of Nicolet-Yamaska Regional County Municipality: municipality of Saint-François-du-Lac.

== Geography ==
The main hydrographic slopes near the Vaches River are:

- North side: Saint-François River;
- East side: Saint-François River;
- South side: Saint-Germain River;
- West side: David River, Yamaska River.

The Vaches River originates from agricultural streams draining the area north of highway 20 and north of the highway Interchange 55, west of the city of Drummondville. This headland is located in the "Grantham-Ouest" sector, north of highway 20 and west of the town of Drummondville.

From autoroute 20, the rivière aux Vaches flows mainly in agricultural zones on:

- 3.7 kilometres (2.3 mi) north-west in the "Grantham-Ouest" sector, up to boul. Lemire West;
- 9.9 kilometres (6.2 mi) northwesterly, crossing Saint-Majorique-de-Grantham and Saint-Bonaventure where it winds, up to rang Petit 5 road;
- 5.7 kilometres (3.5 mi) (or 2.9 kilometres (1.8 mi) in a direct line) winding north-west in Saint-Bonaventure, up to rue Principale crossed by the river in the heart of the village;
- 1.5 kilometres (0.93 mi) north-west, to the 2e rang road;
- 6.6 kilometres (4.1 mi) (4.6 kilometres (2.9 mi) in direct line) along route 143 and meandering northwest through Saint-Pie-de-Guire, up to the 13e rang road that the river crosses to the northeast of the village;
- 6.5 kilometres (4.0 mi) (3.6 kilometres (2.2 mi) in direct line) winding north-west through Saint-Pie-de-Guire and Saint-François-du-Lac, up to the mouth.

The Vaches River flows on the southwest bank of the Saint-François River, facing "La Grande Île" and at the foot of the "Rapides Pôltegok". The mouth is located 4.4 kilometres (2.7 mi) upstream of the Blondin bridge which connects Saint-François-du-Lac (southwest side) and Pierreville (north-east side).

== Toponymy ==
The course of the river being mainly in agricultural zone, the cattle (especially cows) come to drink there during all the grazing season (usually from May to November for this region). The river was also used as a grazing limit because the cattle are bad swimmers. Given the relatively uneven relief of this hydrographic slope, the "Vaches River" is aptly named.

An alternative explanation for the name (meaning Cows River) was the presence of wild cows (or vaches sauvages) on the river banks or their proximity before 1830. Since 1664 in New France, the French settlers were designating Wapitis as wild cows, which were in great numbers even in 1800 and before. Settlers preferred hunting wapitis at the woodlands limits instead of feeding a domestic beef before winter. Wapitis disappeared from Quebec around 1830 victims of the overharvesting.

The toponym "Rivière aux Vaches" was officially registered on December 5, 1968, at the Commission de toponymie du Québec.

== See also ==
- List of rivers of Quebec
