= Section 144 of the Constitution Act, 1867 =

Provision of the Constitution of Canada

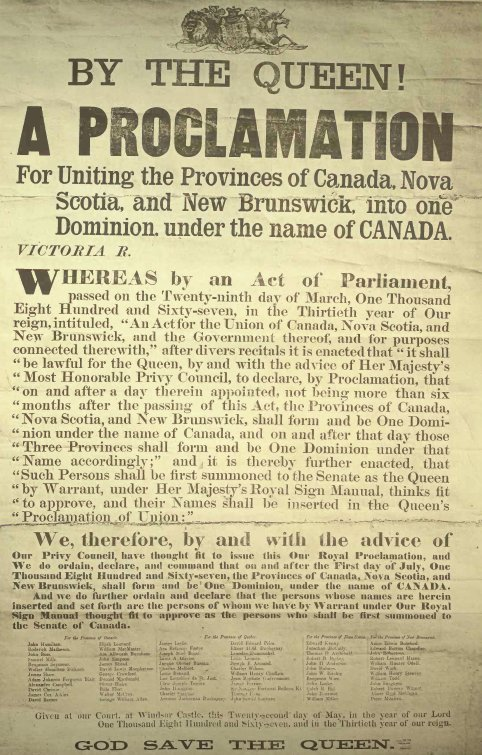
Royal Proclamation which brought the Act into force on July 1, 1867

Section 144 of the Constitution Act, 1867 (French: article 144 de la Loi constitutionnelle de 1867) is a provision of the Constitution of Canada relating to the creation of townships in Quebec.

The Constitution Act, 1867 is the constitutional statute which established Canada. Originally named the British North America Act, 1867, the Act continues to be the foundational statute for the Constitution of Canada, although it has been amended many times since 1867. It is now recognised as part of the supreme law of Canada.

== Constitution Act, 1867 ==
The Constitution Act, 1867 is part of the Constitution of Canada and thus part of the supreme law of Canada. It was the product of extensive negotiations by the governments of the British North American provinces in the 1860s. The Act sets out the constitutional framework of Canada, including the structure of the federal government and the powers of the federal government and the provinces. Originally enacted in 1867 by the British Parliament under the name the British North America Act, 1867, in 1982 the Act was brought under full Canadian control through the Patriation of the Constitution, and was renamed the Constitution Act, 1867. Since Patriation the Act can only be amended in Canada, under the amending formula set out in the Constitution Act, 1982.

== Text of section 144 ==
Section 144 reads:

Constitution of Townships in Quebec
144 The Lieutenant Governor of Quebec may from Time to Time, by Proclamation under the Great Seal of the Province, to take effect from a Day to be appointed therein, constitute Townships in those Parts of the Province of Quebec in which Townships are not then already constituted, and fix the Metes and Bounds thereof.

Section 144 is found in Part IX of the Constitution Act, 1867, dealing with miscellaneous provisions of a general nature. It has not been amended since the Act was enacted in 1867.

== Purpose and interpretation ==
Section 144 carries forward a power that had been used to create townships in Quebec since 1792. The issue was not mentioned in the Quebec Resolutions of 1864, nor in the London Resolutions of 1866. Section 144 was introduced during the drafting process for the bill, prior to introduction in the British Parliament. It first appears in the final draft of the bill dated February 9, 1867.

In 1791, with the influx of Loyalist settlers fleeing the American Revolution, the British Parliament had passed the Constitutional Act, 1791, which created the two provinces of Lower Canada (now Quebec) and Upper Canada (now Ontario). That statute provided that the colonial governors could issue land grants, based on English land law, instead of the feudal seigneurial tenure used in Lower Canada. In 1792, the Lieutenant Governor of Lower Canada issued a proclamation which provided that the land grants in Lower Canada would always be part of a township plan.

From 1792 until the creation of the Province of Canada in 1841, the Governor of Lower Canada established townships by proclamations. That practice continued in the Province of Canada from 1841 to 1867, with the Governor General creating townships by proclamation.

Section 144 continued that practice, by giving the Lieutenant Governor of Quebec the power to create townships by proclamation. The last township created by a proclamation was in 1966.

== Related provisions ==
Land descriptions in Quebec are now governed by the provincial Cadastre Act.
