= Saint-Majorique-de-Grantham =

- Parish municipality
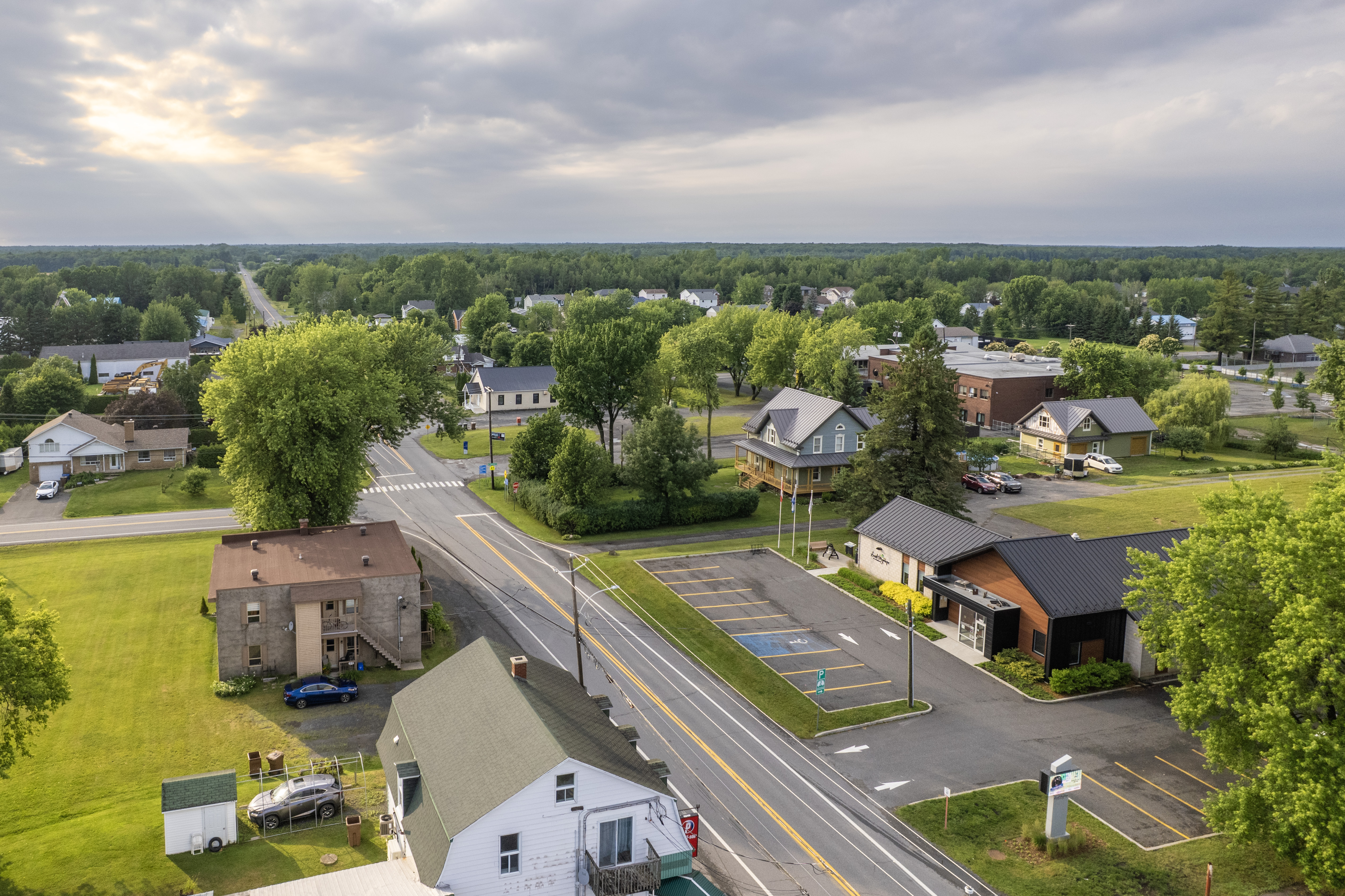

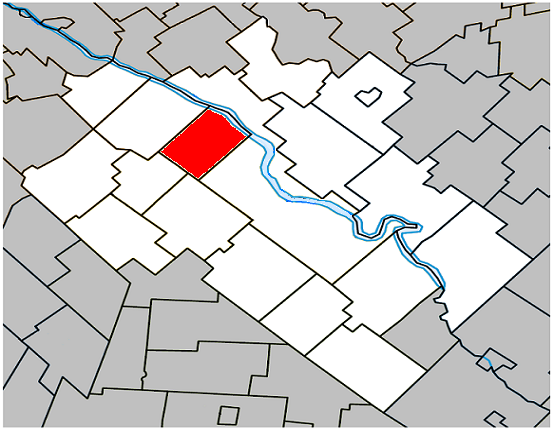
- Location within Drummond RCM.

- Location in southern Quebec.
- Coordinates: 45°56′N 72°35′W
- Country: Canada
- Province: Quebec
- Region: Centre-du-Québec
- RCM: Drummond
- Constituted: July 13, 1901

Government
  - Mayor: Line Fréchette
  - Federal riding: Drummond
  - Prov. riding: Marie-Lacoste-Gérin-Lajoie

Area
  - Total: 58.80 km^{2} (22.70 sq mi)
  - Land: 57.50 km^{2} (22.20 sq mi)

Population (2021)
  - Total: 1,384
  - Density: 24.1/km^{2} (62/sq mi)
  - Pop 2016-2021: ▼0.3%
  - Dwellings: 536
- Time zone: UTC−5 (EST)
  - Summer (DST): UTC−4 (EDT)
- Postal code(s): J2B 8A8
- Area code: 819
- Highways: R-143
- Website: www.st-majorique degrantham.qc.ca

Saint-Majorique-de-Grantham is a parish municipality in the Centre-du-Québec region of Quebec. The population as of the Canada 2021 Census was 1,384.

The name Saint-Majorique-de-Grantham was chosen in honor of father Majorique-Pierre Marchand who was put in charge of a commission to verify the merits of the residents request to have their own parish separated from the rest of Grantham. The Grantham section was put to emphasize the fact that it was formerly a section of that municipality.

== Geography ==
The Saint-François River forms the north-eastern boundary of the municipality, flowing south-westwards. The Rivière aux Vaches, a tributary of the Saint-François River, crosses the municipality from south to north, passing to the west of the town.

== Demographics ==
In the 2021 Census of Population conducted by Statistics Canada, Saint-Majorique-de-Grantham had a population of 1,384 living in 524 of its 536 total private dwellings, a change of −0.3% from its 2016 population of 1,388. With a land area of 57.5 km^{2} (22.2 sq mi), it had a population density of 24.1/km^{2} (62.3/sq mi) in 2021.

Population trend:

Census	Population	Change (%)
2021	1,384	▼0.3%
2016	1,388	▲11%
2011	1,251	▲10.1%
2006	1,136	▲19.3%
2001	952	▲9.3%
1996	871	▼0.1%
1991	872	▲0.8%
1986	865	▲1.6%
1981	851	▲12.1%
1976	759	▲15.7%
1971	656	▲8.1%
1966	607	▲3.1%
1961	589	▼0.2%
1956	590	▲5.0%
1951	562	▼2.9%
1941	579	▲3.4%
1931	560	▼1.8%
1921	570	▼4.5%
1911	597	N/A

Mother tongue language (2021)

Language	Population	Pct (%)
French only	1,355	98.2%
English only	10	0.7%
Both English and French	5	0.4%
Other languages	10	0.7%

== See also ==
- List of parish municipalities in Quebec
- Official municipal website
