= Township (Quebec) =

Cadastral division in Quebec, Canada

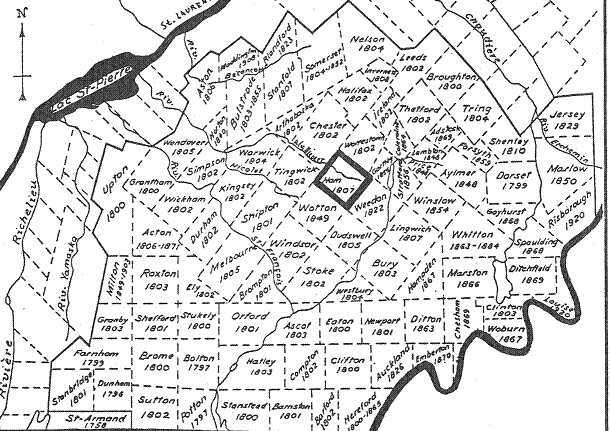
Cadastral divisions of the Eastern Townships.

A township (French: canton) in Quebec, Canada, is a cadastral division of the land. The township system was implemented by the British government to facilitate the granting of public lands for settlement by populations of European background, particularly Loyalists from the American Revolution. Townships were initially also a unit of local government, but that is no longer the case. Townships are now used solely for land description and do not have a governmental function.

In the Quebec system, townships for the most part are approximately 10 miles by 10 miles square, except for those located on the banks of a navigable waterway which are 9 miles abreast and 12 miles deep.

== Creation of the township system ==
Under the seigneurial system of land holdings in force in New France, a local lord, or "seigneur" had overall control of a large area of land. Individuals who held plots of land within the seigneury had to pay seigneurial duties to the local seigneur.

Post-conquest, the British colonial government instituted the township system of land-holding. It was based on English land law, using the tenure of "free and common socage", which did not require seigneurial levies. Following the arrival of Loyalists fleeing the American Revolution, the British Parliament enacted the Constitutional Act, 1791, which introduced this form of land tenure in both Lower Canada and Upper Canada. After the passage of the Act, the British government instructed the Governor to grant land in townships, which was subsequently set out by a proclamation of Lieutenant Governor Clarke in 1792.

The township of Dunham was the first township established in Quebec, on February 2, 1796, in the region which came to be known as the "Eastern Townships of Lower Canada" (cantons de l'Est du Bas-Canada), as opposed to the "Western Townships of Upper Canada". The Eastern Townships also form a historic region. Collectively, they constituted the bloc of the first townships created in what is now Quebec, before the final replacement of the seigneurial regime in 1854. The Eastern Townships include the whole of the Estrie administrative region, and parts of the administrative regions of Centre-du-Québec, Chaudière-Appalaches and Montérégie.

== Abolition of seigneurial tenure ==
In 1854, the Parliament of the Province of Canada abolished the system of seigneurial tenure, converting all former seigneurial tenures to franc-aleu roturier. The subsequent amending act provided for the creation of new townships in new regions, in addition to the existing eastern townships. Later, several other areas were divided into townships before being settled, such as Abitibi-Témiscamingue, Saguenay-Lac-Saint-Jean, and Côte-Nord.

== The system today ==
Today, the townships no longer represent administrative divisions recognized by the Ministry of Municipal Affairs and Housing (Quebec). Only municipal townships, formed from one or more townships, such as township municipalities and united township municipalities, are recognized. However, several towns and municipalities bear the name, or part of the name, of the township in which they are located, such as Amos, Granby, Joliette, Les Escoumins, North Hatley, Roberval, Thetford Mines. Others bear the name of their respective parish, composed with the name of the township where it is located: Saint-Germain-de-Grantham, Saint-Edmond-de-Grantham, Saint-Denis-de-Brompton, Saint-François-Xavier-de-Brompton, Saint-Jacques-de-Leeds, Saint-Pierre-de-Broughton.

The Quebec cadastre is still divided into townships today. According to the system of distribution of the lots, they organize, together with the provisions relating to agricultural land and protected areas, the development and location of new urbanization plans, in rural and semi-rural regions. Within the urban centres, the maintenance of the current townships serves to organize the municipal development of highways and therefore, to promote respect for acquired rights relating to the ownership of lots.

On the other hand, the township system in Quebec constitutes a main premise in the attribution of the relative responsibility.

== Main characteristics of the Quebec township ==
For the most part, townships are approximately 10 miles by 10 miles square (16 km by 16 km), except for those located on the banks of a navigable waterway which are 9 miles abreast and 12 miles deep (14 km by 19 km).

=== Eastern Townships (Cantons de l'Est) ===
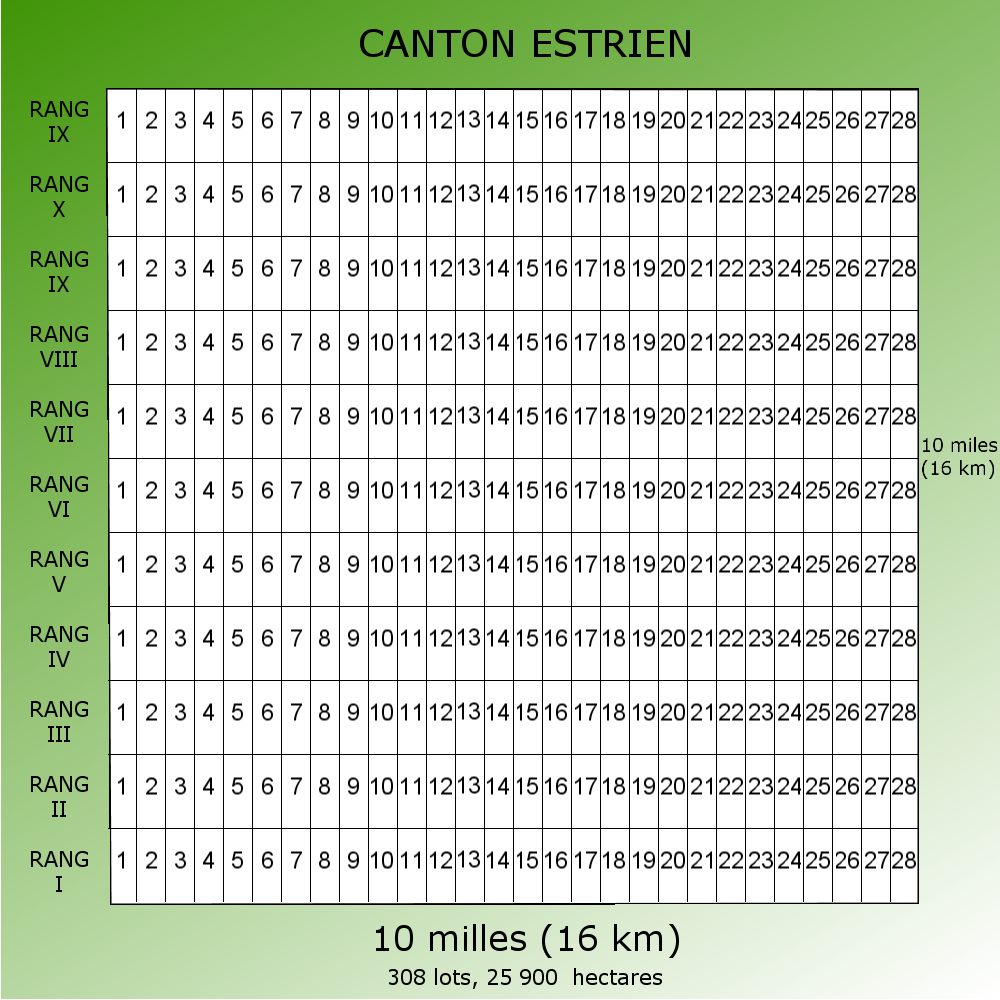
Diagram of a canton estrien

- Technical characteristics of the Eastern township
  - 11 mi by 11 mi (17 km by 17 km)
  - 11 rows of 28 lots
  - 308 lots
  - 25,900 hectares
- Technical characteristics of the batch
  - 588.4 m by 1,478.6 m
  - 84.9 hectares
  - 5% of the land is reserved for the crown for the construction of roads
- Division

From the Yamaska River to the Chaudière River and from the Québec-United States border to half of the Bois-Francs territory, namely:
* Centre-du-Québec (southern half), including cities such as Drummondville;
* Chaudière-Appalaches (southwest), including cities such as Thetford Mines;
* Estrie (entire);
* Montérégie (east-south-east), including cities such as Granby.

=== Abitibian township ===
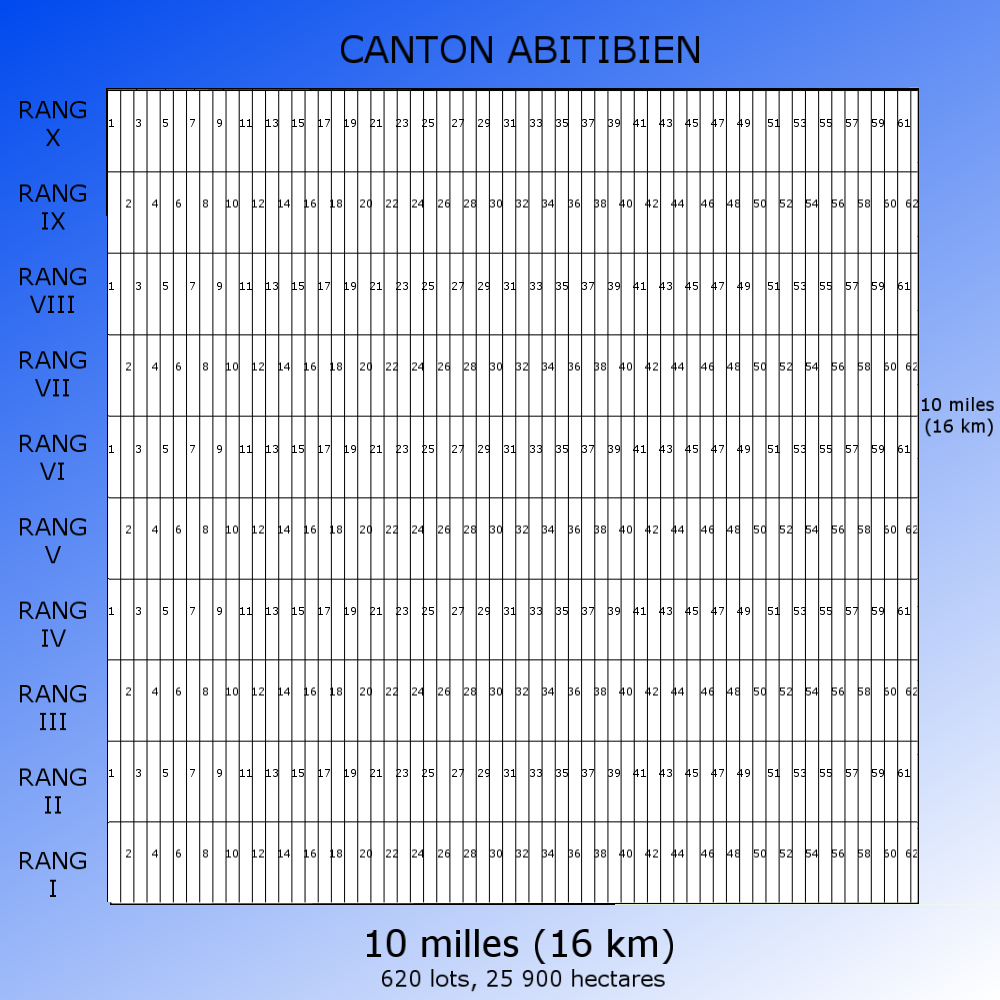
Diagram of an abitibien township

- Technical characteristics of the Abitibien township
  - 10 mi by 10 mi (16 km by 16 km)
  - 10 rows of 62 lots
  - 620 lots
  - 25,900 hectares
- Technical characteristics of the batch
  - 261.52 m by 1,625.43 m
  - 42.5 hectares
- Division
  - Abitibi-Témiscamingue
  - Saguenay-Lac-Saint-Jean
  - Côte-Nord

== See also ==
- Township (Canada)
- List of townships in Quebec
- List of township municipalities in Quebec
- List of united township municipalities in Quebec
