= Yamaska South East River =

River in Montérégie, Quebec, Canada

- Location within Quebec
- Native name: Rivière Yamaska Sud-Est (French)

Location
- Country: Canada
- Province: Quebec
- Administrative region: Montérégie
- MRC: Brome-Missisquoi Regional County Municipality

Physical characteristics
- Source: Various agricultural streams
  - location: Sutton
  - coordinates: 45.11501°N 72.530814°W
  - elevation: 494
- Mouth: Yamaska River
  - location: Farnham
  - coordinates: 45.28639°N 72.91695°W
  - elevation: 61 m (200 ft)
- Length: 55.4 km (34.4 mi)
- Basin size: 303 km^{2} (117 sq mi)

Basin features
- River system: Saint Lawrence River
- Tributaries
  - left: (upstream) cours d'eau Césaire-Mercure, cours d'eau Beauvais, cours d'eau Allen, ruisseau Pettes, ruisseau de Jackson.
  - right: (upstream) cours d'eau Benjamin, ruisseau Alder, ruisseau Draper.

The Yamaska Southeast river is a tributary of the Yamaska River. It flows in the Brome-Missisquoi Regional County Municipality (MRC), in the administrative region of Montérégie, on the South Shore of the Saint Lawrence River, in Quebec, Canada. Its course to the northwest crosses the municipalities of: Sutton, Cowansville, Brigham and Farnham.

== Geography ==
The main neighboring hydrographic slopes of the Yamaska Southeast River are:

- North side: Yamaska River;
- East side: Brome Lake, Missisquoi River North;
- South side: Morpior stream, Pike River (Missisquoi Bay tributary), North Pike River, Sutton River;
- West side: Écossais River, rivière du Sud-Ouest.

The Yamaska Southeast river takes its sources from several streams draining the northern slope of Mont Sutton, north of Sutton and south of Brome Lake. Its main tributary is the Jackson stream (coming from the northeast) which receives water from:

- Johnston Creek (coming from the southeast) which drains the south of Brome Lake;
- North Branch stream (coming from the north) which drains the valley to the west of "Tibbits Hill".

Upper course of the river (segment of 26.6 kilometres (16.5 mi))

From the confluence of two mountain streams on the western flank of the Gagnon and Écho mountains, the Yamaska Southeast river flows over:

- 7.4 kilometres (4.6 mi) northwesterly in the forest area to the route 215 bridge at Sutton Jonction;
- 2.6 kilometres (1.6 mi) north, along the railway line and the road, in an agricultural and forest zone, to a (stream coming from the southwest) which empties into the Yamaska Southeast is south of the hamlet Mansville;
- 3.4 kilometres (2.1 mi) north-west in a forest area to a long bay where Jackson's stream empties (coming from the north-east);
- 4.1 kilometres (2.5 mi) westward in the agricultural zone to the bridge over the hamlet of West Brome (i.e. route 139);
- 6.6 kilometres (4.1 mi) northwesterly to the route 104 bridge, which spans the bay to the southeast of Davignon Lake;
- 2.5 kilometres (1.6 mi) heading west across Lake Davignon (altitude: 110 metres (360 ft)) which is located on the east side of the town of Cowansville.

Course downstream of Davignon Lake (segment of 28.8 kilometres (17.9 mi))

From Davignon Lake, the Yamaska Southeast river flows over:

- 3.3 kilometres (2.1 mi) winding east through Cowansville to the mouth of Gear Creek (coming from the southwest);
- 4.0 kilometres (2.5 mi) (or 1.6 kilometres (0.99 mi) in a direct line) north-west winding up to the bridge on route 139;
- 7.2 kilometres (4.5 mi) northwesterly to the bridge in the village of Brigham;
- 1.9 kilometres (1.2 mi) northwesterly to the Canadian National railway bridge;
- 4.7 kilometres (2.9 mi) (or 2.9 kilometres (1.8 mi) in a direct line) towards the west by making a loop towards the north, up to the Césaire-Mercure stream;
- 7.7 kilometres (4.8 mi) (or 3.0 kilometres (1.9 mi) in a direct line) north, winding up to its mouth.

The Yamaska Southeast river empties on the south shore of the Yamaska River at 7.0 kilometres (4.3 mi) upstream of the bridge of route 235 of Farnham and 13.5 kilometres (8.4 mi) downstream of the Adamsville highway bridge.

== Toponymy ==
The toponym "Rivière Yamaska Sud-Est" was officially registered on December 5, 1968, in the Bank of place names of the Commission de toponymie du Québec.

== See also ==
- Yamaska River, a watercourse
- Farnham, a municipality
- Cowansville, a municipality
- Brigham, a municipality
- Sutton, a municipality
- Brome-Missisquoi Regional County Municipality
- List of rivers of Quebec
