= Ministry of Energy and Natural Resources (Quebec) =

The Ministry of Natural Resources and Forests (French: Ministère des Ressources naturelles et des Forêts) is responsible for the sustainable management and development of forest and mineral resources and public lands in the Canadian province of Québec.

The current Minister is Natalie Bisaillon.

== Responsibilities ==
MRNF is responsible for managing the natural resources of Quebec: plants, minerals, wood, energy, etc.
