= Natalie Bisaillon =

Quebec politician

Natalie Bisaillon MNA
- Natalie Bisaillon, September 2026

Member of the National Assembly for Marie-Lacoste-Gérin-Lajoie
- Incumbent
- Assumed office October 5, 2026
- Preceded by: Riding established

Personal details
- Party: Parti Québécois

Natalie Bisaillon is a Quebec politician who was the elected to the National Assembly of Quebec for Marie-Lacoste-Gérin-Lajoie in the 2026 Quebec general election as a member of the Parti Québécois. She was the CEO of Desjardins International Asset Management. She also held several senior management positions at Intact from 2007 to 2020 and worked as an analyst and portfolio manager at the Caisse de dépôt et placement du Québec between 2001 and 2007.

Bisaillon was appointed Minister of Natural Resources and Forests in 2026.

== Electoral history ==
2026 Quebec general election: Marie-Lacoste-Gérin-Lajoie
** Preliminary results — Not yet official **
Party	Candidate	Votes	%	±%
Parti Québécois	Natalie Bisaillon	11,323	36.13	
Conservative	Laura Tremblay	8,553	27.29	
Liberal	Alexandra Houle	4,612	14.72	
Coalition Avenir Québec	Patrick Saindon	4,305	13.74	
Québec solidaire	Sébastien Bage	2,160	6.89	
Climat Québec	Mathieu Fillion	153	0.49	
Independent	Sylvain Marcoux	117	0.37	
Démocratie directe	Mario Roy	115	0.37	
Total valid votes				
Total rejected ballots				
Turnout			68.75	
Electors on the lists				
Source: Élections Québec
