= Saint-Pie-de-Guire =

- Parish municipality
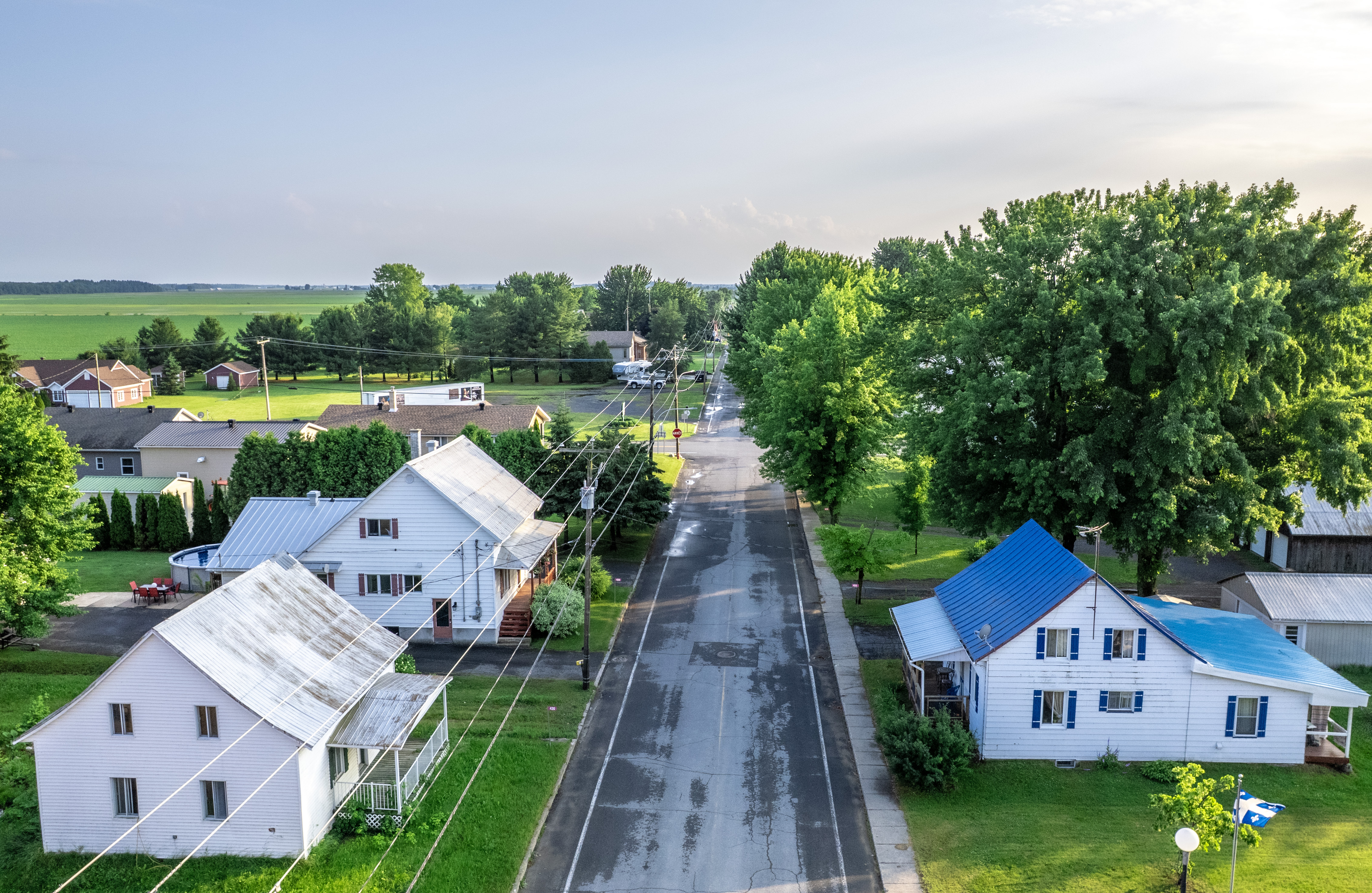

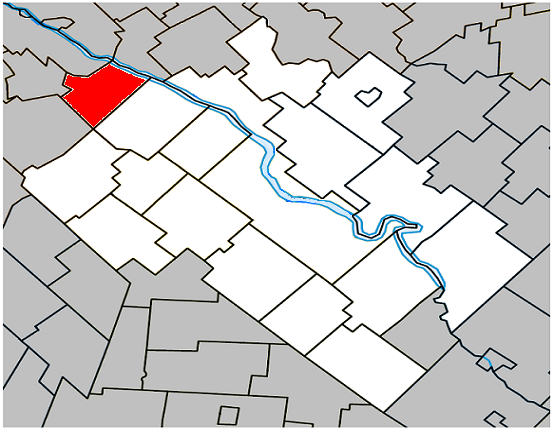
- Location within Drummond RCM.

- Location in southern Quebec.
- Coordinates: 46°00′N 72°45′W
- Country: Canada
- Province: Quebec
- Region: Centre-du-Québec
- RCM: Drummond
- Constituted: June 14, 1866

Government
  - Mayor: Benoît Yergeau
  - Federal riding: Drummond
  - Prov. riding: Marie-Lacoste-Gérin-Lajoie

Area
  - Total: 52.60 km^{2} (20.31 sq mi)
  - Land: 51.27 km^{2} (19.80 sq mi)

Population (2021)
  - Total: 446
  - Density: 8.7/km^{2} (23/sq mi)
  - Pop 2016-2021: ▼0.9%
  - Dwellings: 206
- Time zone: UTC−5 (EST)
  - Summer (DST): UTC−4 (EDT)
- Postal code(s): J0G 1R0
- Area codes: 450 and 579
- Highways: R-143
- Website: www.stpiedeguire.ca

Saint-Pie-de-Guire (French pronunciation: [sɛ̃ pi də ɡiʁ]) is a parish municipality in the Centre-du-Québec region of southwestern Quebec. The population as of the Canada 2021 Census was 446.

== History ==
Its territory comes from a portion of the De Guire seigniory (also known as the Rivière David seigniory). This seigniory was established around 1750 and granted to Joseph Deguire, called Desrosiers, but it was later sold to the Wurtele family. This municipality was founded in 1866 and was then a part of the parish of Saint-David (1835). It encompasses ranges 6 through 13 of the seigniory, and the entire area east of the 13th range up to the Saint-François River. In 1874, it became the parish municipality of Saint-Pie-de-Guire, created by detaching from the parish of Saint-David.

Settlers began arriving around 1820 in the 13th range and in October 1822 in the 6th and 7th ranges. In the latter case, lots began to be allocated in 1822 for clearing, but no one lived there in a house before 1827, except perhaps for squatters. The 1825 census of Lower Canada mentions no residents with houses in the 6th and 7th ranges, but notes many settlers in the 5th range of Saint-David. The 1831 census indicates the existence of 8 houses occupied by settlers in the 6th and 7th ranges. The 8th range opened and received its first settlers in 1842, at the same time the 13th range was extended. The settlers had to "build the road" in front of their own lots due to their contracts with Lord Wurtele.

One specific feature of ranges 3 to 7 in 1800 and later was the presence of a huge marshy area. It took decades to drain by digging ditches. This swamp, named "les Étangs Deguire" (The Deguire Ponds), covered 27.3 square kilometers. This was 19% of the total area of the seigniory. It was a paradise for beavers, otters, martens, and fur-bearing animals. Moose were likely present until 1840. The presence of "wild cows" (elk/wapiti), noted by Indigenous peoples on the banks of the Rivière-aux-Vaches, gave the river its name. The elk disappeared from Quebec around 1830. They were very easy for settlers to kill because they traveled in single line

Between 1869 and 1881, a foundry produced cast iron from local iron ore deposits, such as limonite and brown hematite. The blast furnace was heated using locally produced charcoal. Today, the economic activity is predominantly agricultural.

== Demographics ==
In the 2021 Census of Population conducted by Statistics Canada, Saint-Pie-de-Guire had a population of 446 living in 185 of its 206 total private dwellings, a change of −0.9% from its 2016 population of 450. With a land area of 51.27 km^{2} (19.80 sq mi), it had a population density of 8.7/km^{2} (22.5/sq mi) in 2021.

Population trend:

Census	Population	Change (%)
2021	446	▼0.9%
2016	450	▼1.3%
2011	456	▲0.7%
2006	453	▲3.0%
2001	440	▼6.6%
1996	471	▼5.8%
1991	500	▼8.8%
1986	548	▼5.5%
1981	580	▲11.3%
1976	521	▲1.0%
1971	516	▼6.9%
1966	554	▼10.2%
1961	617	▼7.8%
1956	669	▲2.1%
1951	655	▼2.1%
1941	669	▼13.7%
1931	775	▼6.9%
1921	832	▼10.8%
1911	933	▼16.4%
1901	1,268	▼1.6%
1891	1,289	▼16.2%
1881	1,539	▲23.9%
1871	1,242	N/A

Mother tongue language (2021)

Language	Population	Pct (%)
French only	440	98.9%
English only	0	0.0%
Both English and French	0	0.0%
Other languages	5	1.1%

== See also ==
- List of parish municipalities in Quebec
- Municipal reorganization in Quebec
