= Saint-Edmond-de-Grantham =

- Municipality
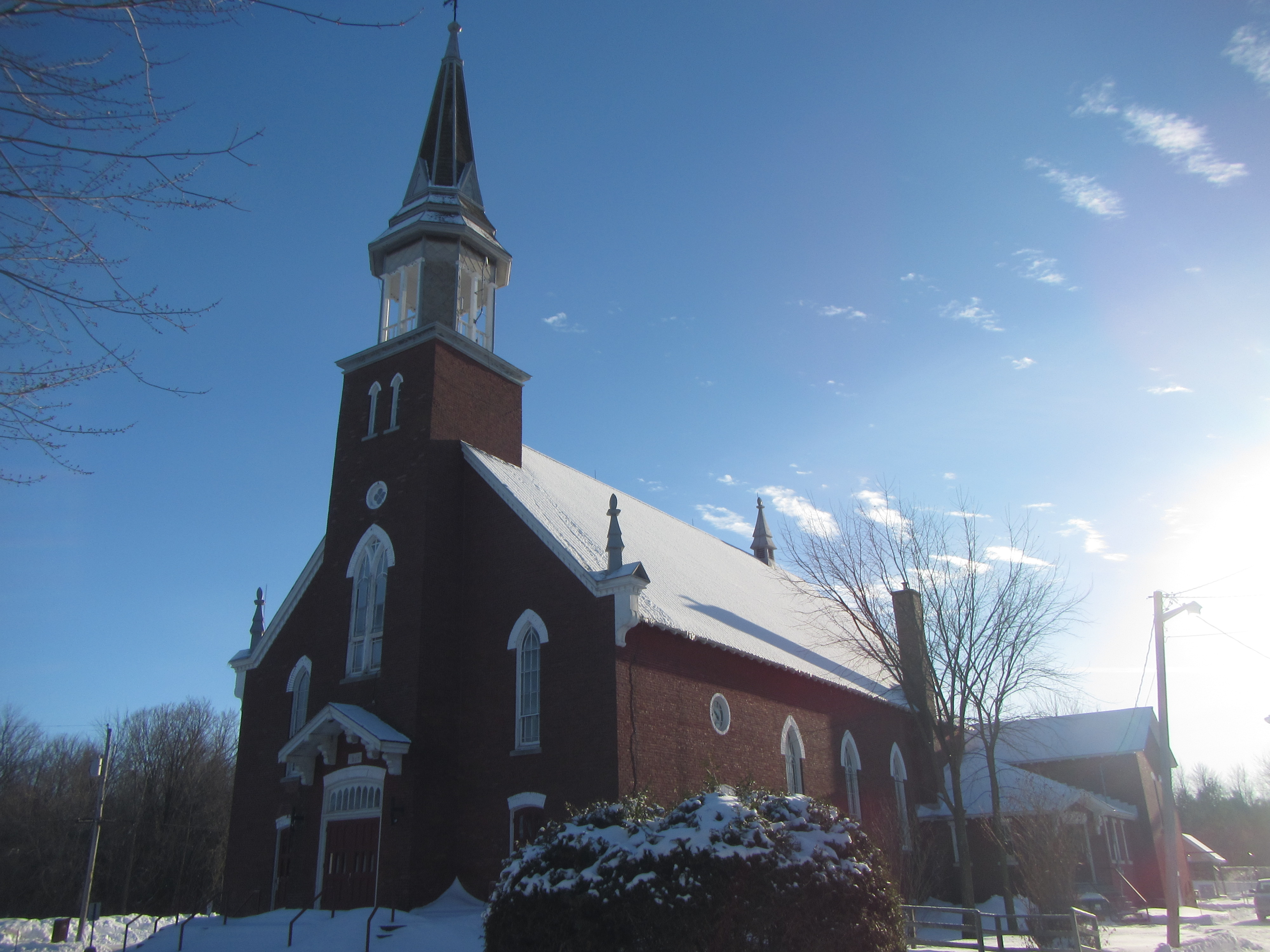
- Church of Saint-Edmond-de-Grantham

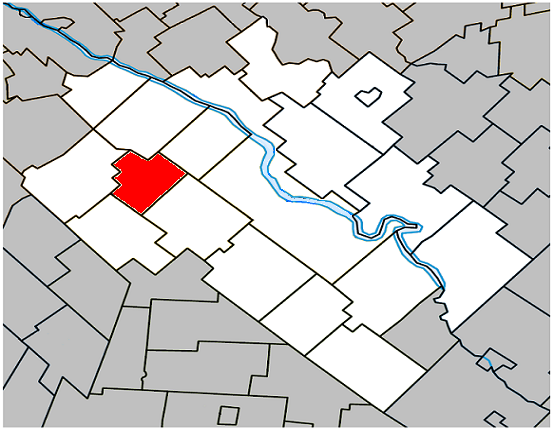
- Location within Drummond RCM.

- Location in southern Quebec.
- Coordinates: 45°53′N 72°40′W
- Country: Canada
- Province: Quebec
- Region: Centre-du-Québec
- RCM: Drummond
- Constituted: February 9, 1918

Government
  - Mayor: Richard Kirouac
  - Federal riding: Drummond
  - Prov. riding: Marie-Lacoste-Gérin-Lajoie

Area
  - Total: 48.60 km^{2} (18.76 sq mi)
  - Land: 48.29 km^{2} (18.64 sq mi)

Population (2021)
  - Total: 804
  - Density: 16.6/km^{2} (43/sq mi)
  - Pop 2016-2021: ▲5.5%
  - Dwellings: 324
- Time zone: UTC−5 (EST)
  - Summer (DST): UTC−4 (EDT)
- Postal code(s): J0C 1K0
- Area code: 819
- Highways: R-122
- Website: www.st-edmond -de-grantham.qc.ca

Saint-Edmond-de-Grantham (French pronunciation: [sɛ̃t‿ɛdmɔ̃ də ɡʁɑ̃tɔm]) is a municipality in the Centre-du-Québec region of Quebec. The population as of the Canada 2021 Census was 804.

== Demographics ==
In the 2021 Census of Population conducted by Statistics Canada, Saint-Edmond-de-Grantham had a population of 804 living in 301 of its 324 total private dwellings, a change of 5.5% from its 2016 population of 762. With a land area of 48.29 km^{2} (18.64 sq mi), it had a population density of 16.6/km^{2} (43.1/sq mi) in 2021.

Population trend:

Census	Population	Change (%)
2021	804	▲5.5%
2016	762	▲13.2%
2011	673	▲6.7%
2006	631	▲3.3%
2001	611	▲6.8%
1996	572	▲5.1%
1991	544	▲5.4%
1986	516	▼7.5%
1981	558	▲9.6%
1976	509	▲4.7%
1971	486	▲2.5%
1966	474	▼10.4%
1961	529	▼0.8%
1956	533	▲7.5%
1951	496	▼4.4%
1941	519	▲55.9%
1931	333	▼26.2%
1921	451	N/A

Mother tongue language (2021)

Language	Population	Pct (%)
French only	790	98.8%
English only	5	0.6%
Both English and French	5	0.6%
Other languages	5	0.6%

== See also ==
- List of municipalities in Quebec
