= Brome Lake =

Lake in Quebec, Canada

Brome Lake Lac Brome
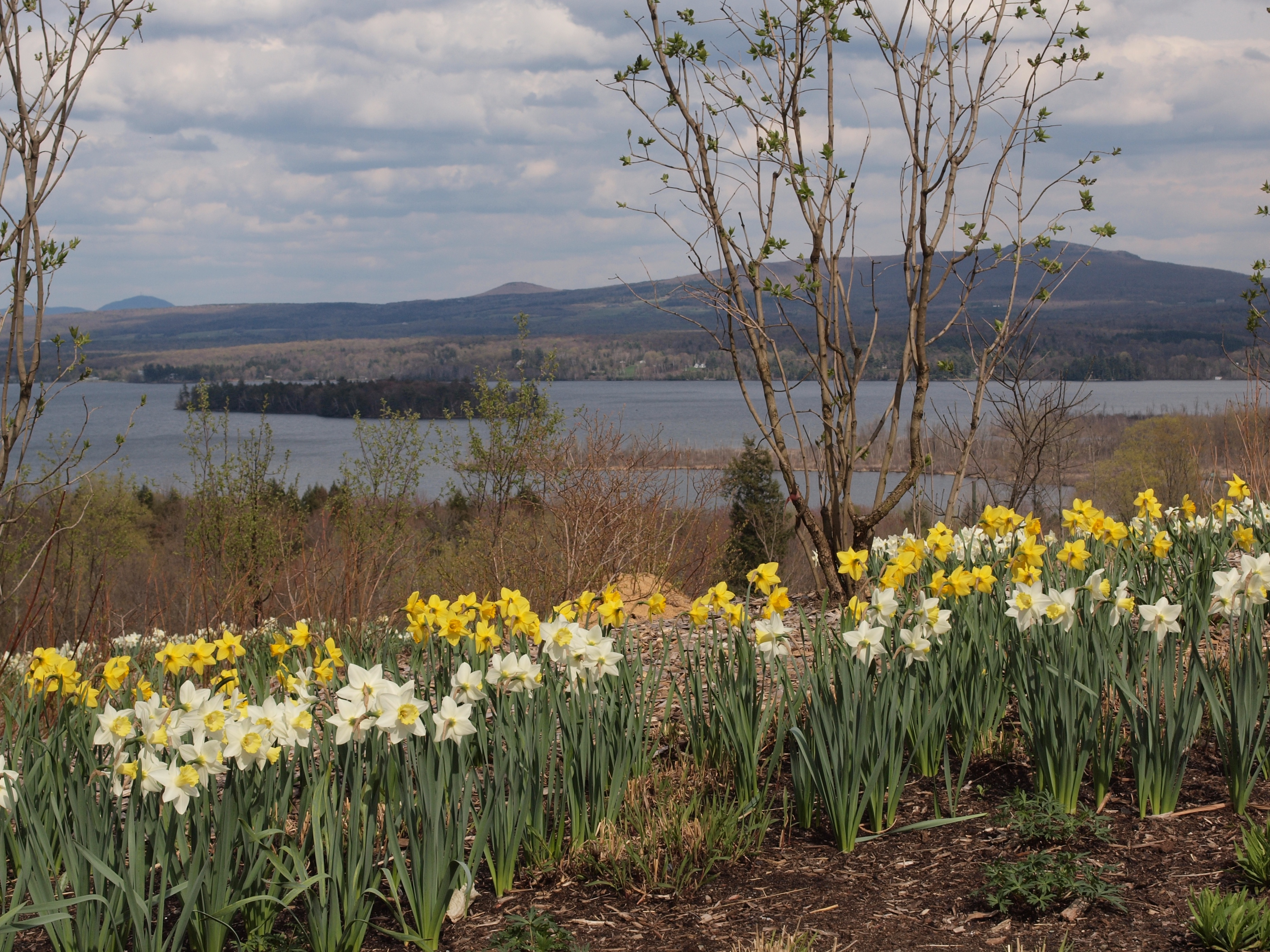

- Location within Quebec
- Location: Brome-Missisquoi, Montérégie, Quebec, Canada
- Coordinates: 45°14′55″N 72°30′53″W
- Basin countries: Canada
- Surface area: 14.53 km^{2} (5.61 sq mi)
- Max. depth: 13 m (43 ft)
- Surface elevation: 193 m (633 ft)
- Settlements: Brome Lake

Brome Lake (French: Lac Brome) is a freshwater lake in the town of Brome Lake, in the Brome-Missisquoi regional county municipality of the Montérégie region of Quebec, Canada. It is the source of the Yamaska River.

The name Brome Lake comes from Brome Township which itself was first recorded on the map of Gale and Duberger in 1795. The name of the township was shortly afterward transferred to the lake. The lake was first referred to under that name in 1815 by Joseph Bouchette, after which the name was kept. As for the name Brome, it probably is borrowed from the name of a village in Suffolk or Brome Hall, the castle of the aristocratic Cornwallis family, of which one of its members, Charles Cornwallis was titled Viscount Brome between 1753 and 1762.

The Quilliams-Durrull Nature Reserve is on Quilliams Brook, a small stream that feeds into the lake.

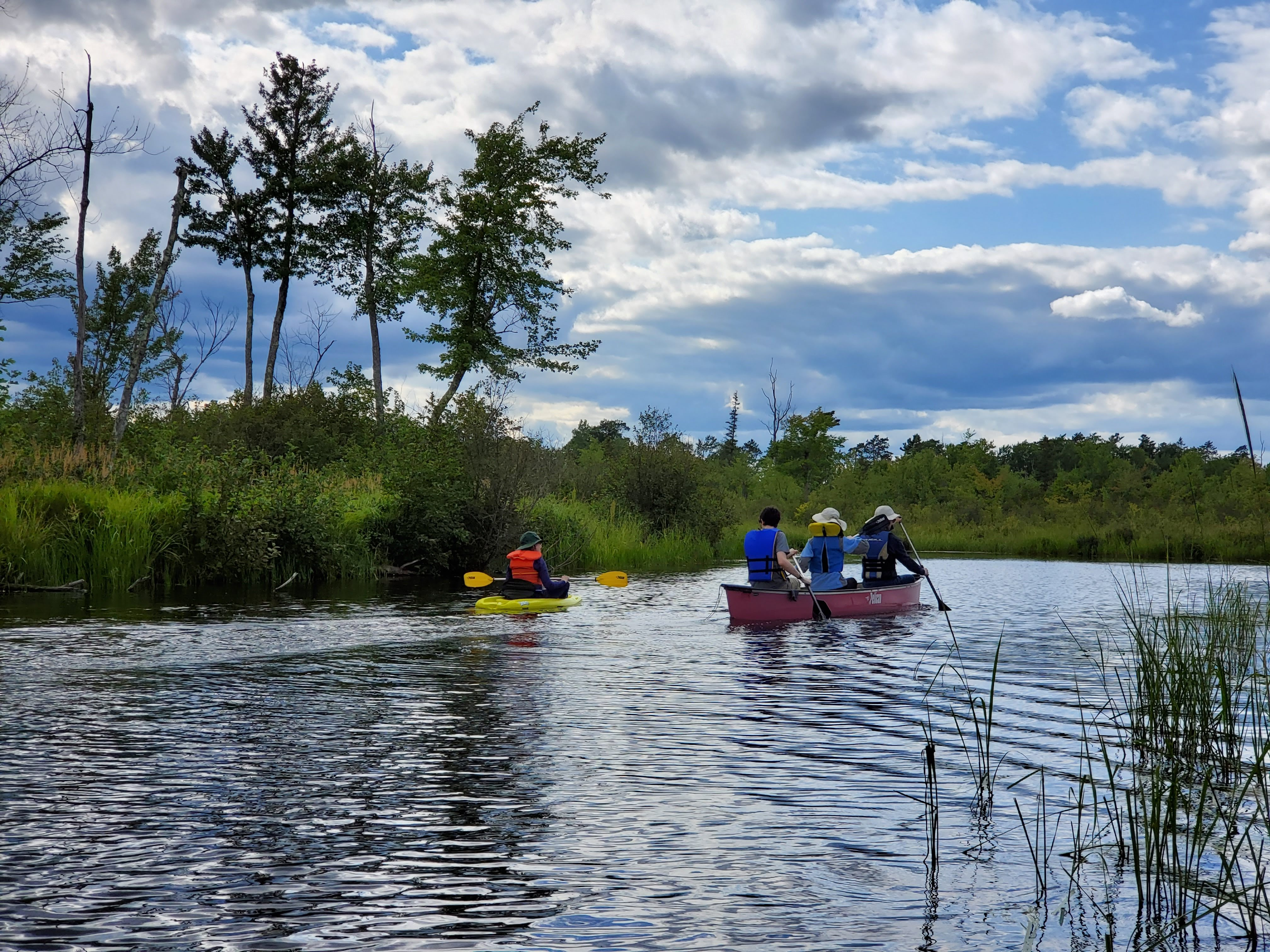
Quilliams Brook, a tributary of Brome Lake

== Gallery ==
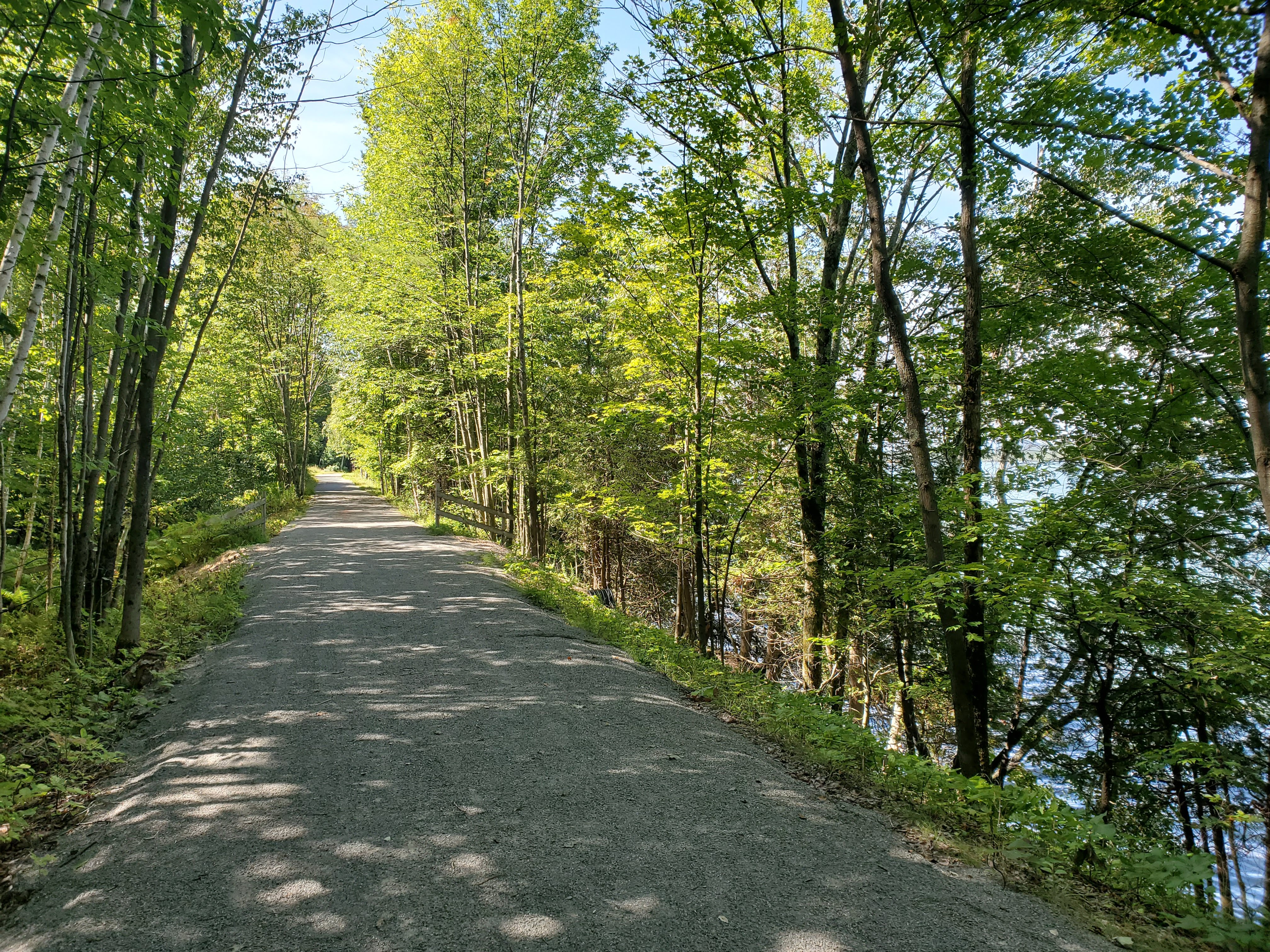
Brome Lake walking path

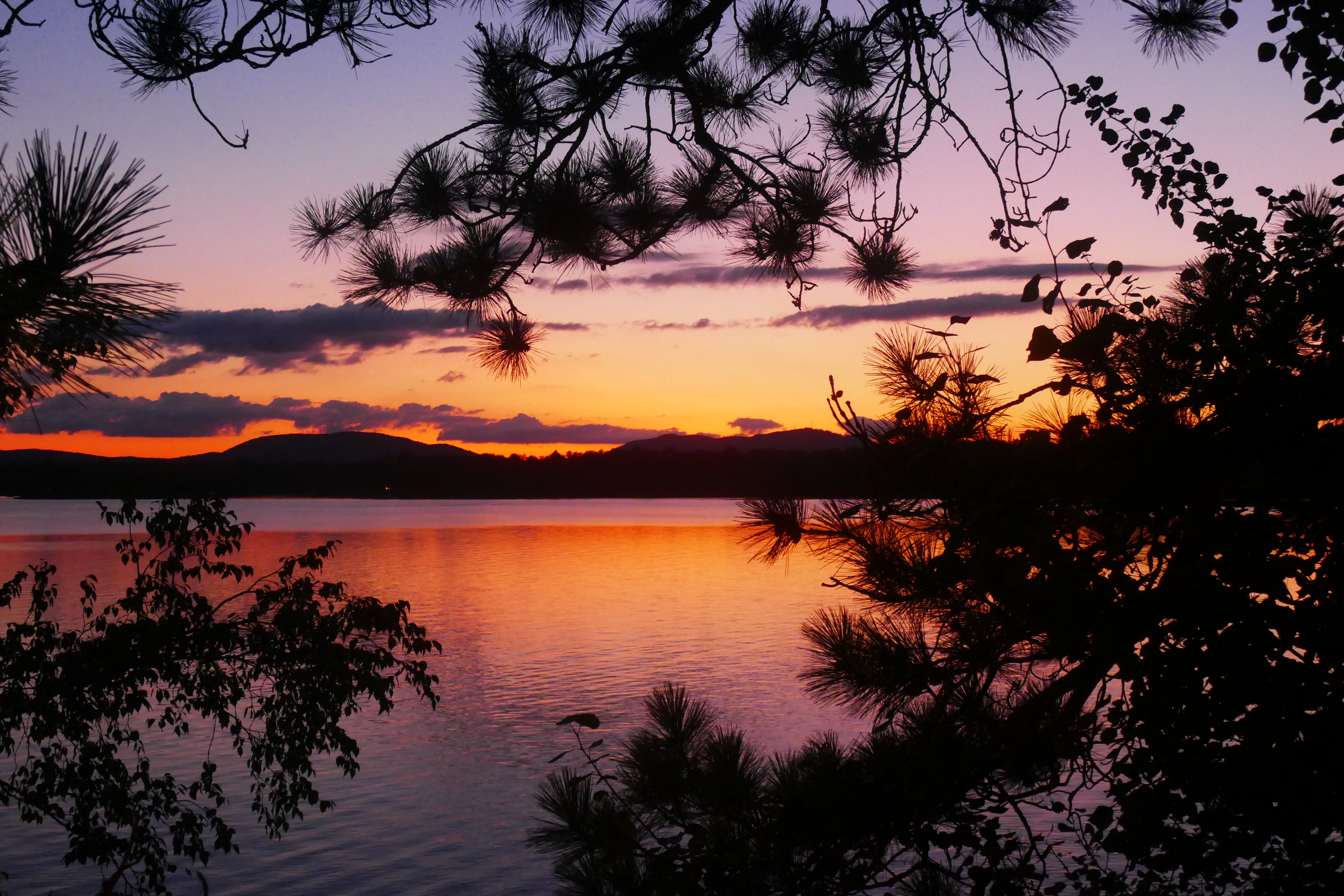

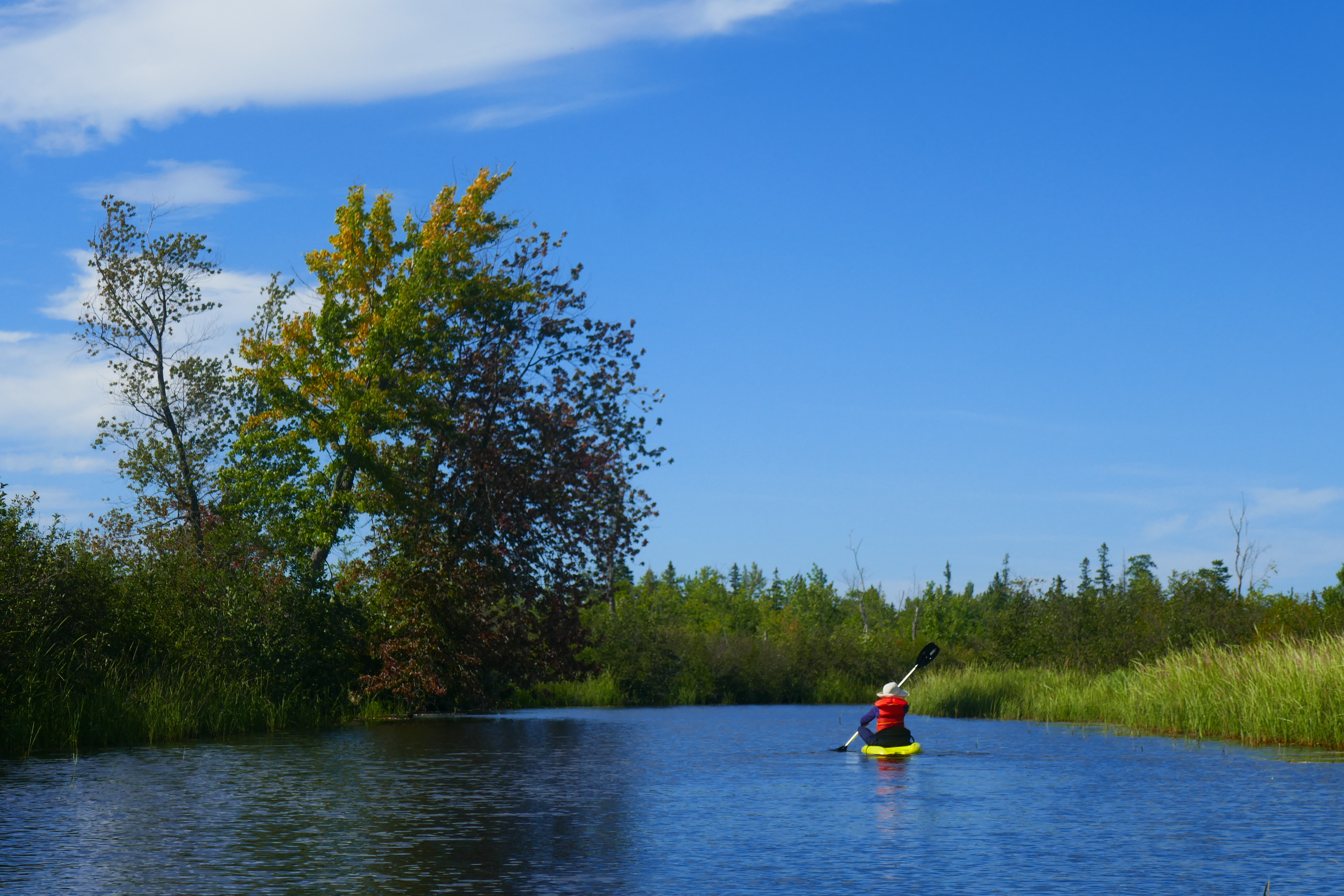
Quilliams-Durrull Nature Reserve
