= Saint-Bonaventure, Quebec =

Saint-Bonaventure
- Municipality
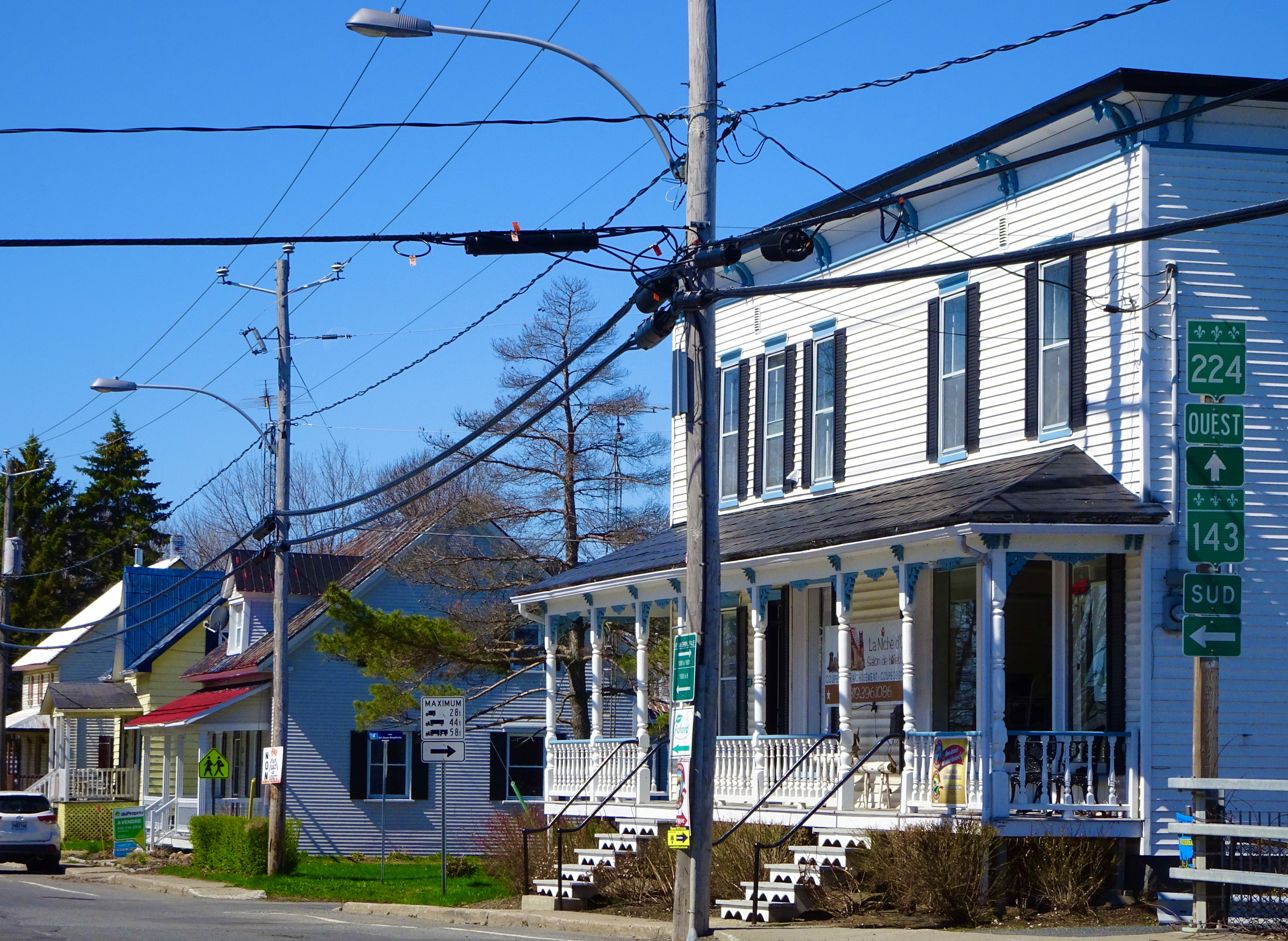

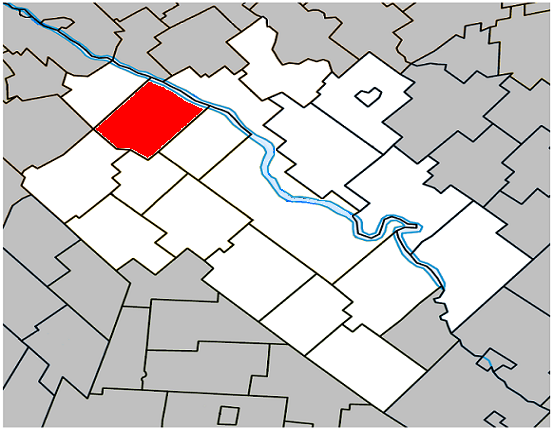
- Location within Drummond RCM

- Location in southern Quebec
- Coordinates: 45°58′N 72°41′W
- Country: Canada
- Province: Quebec
- Region: Centre-du-Québec
- RCM: Drummond
- Constituted: January 1, 1867
- Named for: Bonaventure

Government
  - Mayor: Guy Lavoie
  - Federal riding: Drummond
  - Prov. riding: Marie-Lacoste-Gérin-Lajoie

Area
  - Total: 81.00 km^{2} (31.27 sq mi)
  - Land: 78.72 km^{2} (30.39 sq mi)

Population (2021)
  - Total: 1,066
  - Density: 13.5/km^{2} (35/sq mi)
  - Pop 2016-2021: ▲3.4%
  - Dwellings: 457
- Time zone: UTC−5 (EST)
  - Summer (DST): UTC−4 (EDT)
- Postal code(s): J0C 1C0
- Area code: 819
- Highways: R-143; R-224
- Website: www.saint-bonaventure.ca

Saint-Bonaventure (French pronunciation: [sɛ̃ bɔnavɑ̃tyʁ]) is a municipality in the Drummond Regional County Municipality of southwestern Quebec. The population as of the Canada 2021 Census was 1,066. It lies at the eastern terminus of Quebec Route 224, northeast of Saint-Guillaume.

== History ==
Origins: Beginnings of the Upton Township in 1800

The history of the municipality begins in 1800 when the government of Lower Canada allocated the Upton township to Alexander Grant. The northern portion of the township then encompassed the territories of the municipalities of Saint-Guillaume and Saint-Bonaventure, the latter of which was separated in 1856.

Initially careless in his administration, Grant decided to take charge of his township and legally concede, through contracts in 1826, the lands occupied "illegally" since 1815-1820. At that time, approximately 250 people making up 65 families were located in the township, by the Ruisseau des Chênes and the upper reach of the Rivière aux Vaches, often as a result of confusion over boundaries with the Deguire seigniory.

First Settlers and Land Clearing

The period from 1840 to 1856 represents the complete transformation of Saint-Bonaventure's territory, changing from an uninhabited forest massif to a Parish officially recognized by civil and religious authorities.

1840 - 1841: Waiting and Surveying

- A virgin forest: Although the Upton township had been surveyed as early as 1792, the lands surrounding the Rivière-aux-Vaches and the Saint-François River remained wild and isolated in the early 1840s.
- The attraction of Saint-Guillaume: The neighboring parish of Saint-Guillaume-d'Upton began to take shape. It was from this core that future settlers prepared their advance toward the east.

1842 - 1854: Land Clearing and Family Settlement

- October 1842: Antoine Lupien officially arrived and settled on the territory. He cut down the first trees and built the first house.
- The arrival of reinforcements (1843+): Joseph Lupien, Jos Joyal, Léon Côté, and François Nault quickly joined him. They cleared the historic path of the 5th Range of the Upton township.
- Rapid growth: In the span of ten years, dozens of French-Canadian families settled to cultivate the land. Administratively, all of these settlers depended entirely on the village of Saint-Guillaume.

1855 - 1856: Independence and Foundation

- July 1855: The government created the municipality of the Upton-Partie-Nord-Est township. This temporary entity legally grouped Saint-Guillaume and the embryonic sector of Saint-Bonaventure.
- February 1856: Faced with a growing population, Bishop Thomas Cooke decreed the canonical erection of the Saint-Bonaventure parish.
- June 1856: Civil erection was proclaimed. The geographic boundaries of the future municipality were officially drawn into law. By the end of 1856, Saint-Bonaventure possessed its own legal and religious existence, ending fourteen years of direct dependence on Saint-Guillaume.

=== 1975 Tornado ===
On July 24, 1975, a tornado with winds exceeding 300 km/h struck the village. It caused four deaths: three casualties on the day the tornado hit around 5 p.m., and a fourth a few days later in the hospital. More than a hundred houses and farms were damaged, and some were completely destroyed. As a result a permanent weather station was installed north of the church on Labonté St. to monitor elements.

== Demographics ==
In the 2021 Census of Population conducted by Statistics Canada, Saint-Bonaventure had a population of 1,066 living in 429 of its 457 total private dwellings, a change of 3.4% from its 2016 population of 1,031. With a land area of 78.72 km^{2} (30.39 sq mi), it had a population density of 13.5/km^{2} (35.1/sq mi) in 2021.

=== Population ===
Population trend:

Census	Population	Change (%)
2021	1,066	▲3.4%
2016	1,031	▲1.4%
2011	1,017	▲3.5%
2006	983	▼5.8%
2001	1,043	▼2.6%
1996	1,071	▼0.7%
1991	1,079	▼2.9%
1986	1,111	▲0.4%
1981	1,107	▲20.2%
1976	921	▼1.1%
1971	931	▼3.4%
1966	964	▼6.3%
1961	1,029	▼3.8%
1956	1,070	▲0.2%
1951	1,068	▲6.3%
1941	1,005	▼1.1%
1931	1,016	▼17.1%
1921	1,225	▼15.0%
1911	1,441	▲13.9%
1901	1,265	▲4.6%
1891	1,209	▲13.7%
1881	1,063	▼7.1%
1871	1,144	N/A

=== Language ===
Mother tongue language (2021)

Language	Population	Pct (%)
French only	1,035	97.2%
English only	0	0.0%
Both English and French	15	1.4%
Other languages	10	0.9%

== See also ==
- List of municipalities in Quebec
- Municipal reorganization in Quebec
