= David River (Yamaska River tributary) =

River in Quebec, Canada

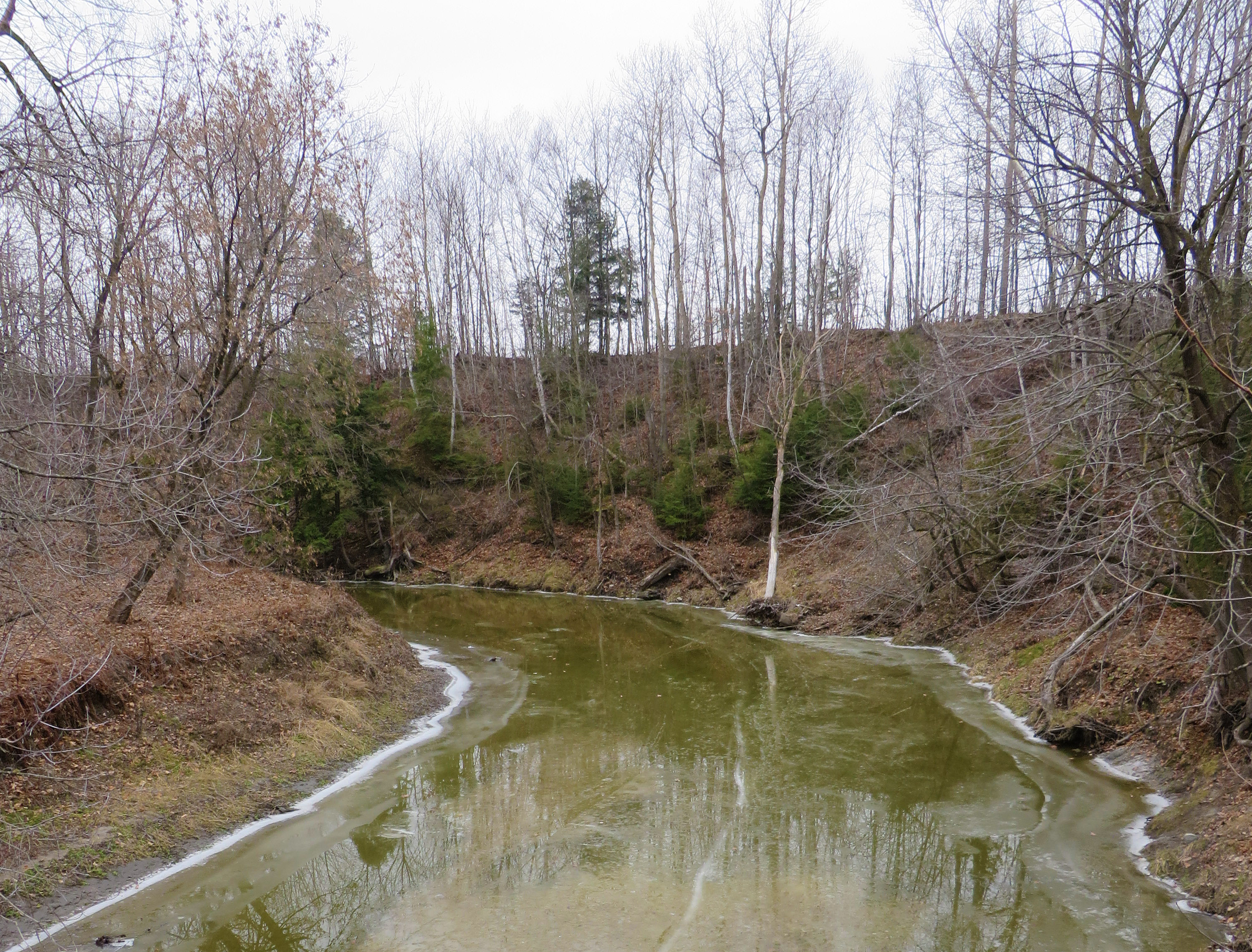

Location
- Country: Canada
- Province: Quebec
- Region: Montérégie and Centre-du-Québec
- Regional County Municipality: Drummond Regional County Municipality, Pierre-De Saurel Regional County Municipality

Physical characteristics
- Source: Various agricol streams
  - location: Saint-Eugène
  - coordinates: 45.801863°N 72.645748°E
  - elevation: 79 m (259 ft)
- Mouth: Yamaska River
  - location: Saint-David
  - coordinates: 45.97111°N 72.89972°W
  - elevation: 10 m (33 ft)
- Length: 53.5 km (33.2 mi)

Basin features
- Tributaries
  - left: (Upstream) ruisseau Sainte-Caroline, ruisseau des Chênes, ruisseau Félix-Julien, ruisseau du rang Lachapelle, ruisseau Saint-Marmert, cours d'eau Dupré, cours d'eau Labbé, ruisseau Armand-Doré.
  - right: (Upstream) ruisseau Morrissette, cours d'eau Saint-Nicolas, cours d'eau Lacourse, ruisseau Mondor, ruisseau Théroux, ruisseau Rousseau, ruisseau Jean-Paul, ruisseau du Rang de Sorel Nord-Est, ruisseau Pépin, ruisseau Louis-Édouard-Tessier, cours d'eau Lambert, ruisseau Laramée, cours d'eau Paradis, décharge Fournier.

The David River is a tributary of the East shore of the Yamaska River. It flows north-east on the South Shore of the St. Lawrence River, in Quebec, Canada, in the municipalities of:

- Saint-Eugène, Saint-Edmond-de-Grantham, Saint-Guillaume who are part of the Drummond Regional County Municipality, in the administrative region of Centre-du-Québec;
- Saint-David in the regional county municipality (MRC) Pierre-De Saurel, in the administrative region of Montérégie.

In addition to the villages crossed by the course of the river, the economic vocation of this hydrographic slope is mainly agricultural, and forestry for certain areas.

== Geography ==
The main neighboring hydrographic slopes of the David River are:

- North side: Saint-François River;
- East side: Saint-François River, Saint-Germain River;
- South side: Noire River;
- West side: Yamaska River.

The David River takes its source from agricultural streams draining the territory of the municipality of Saint-Eugène. This headland is located between the village of Saint-Eugène and that of Saint-Germain-de-Grantham, north of highway 20 and west of Drummondville. The course of the river descends on 53.5 kilometres (33.2 mi) with a drop of 69 metres (226 ft) according to the following segments:

Upper course of the river (segment of 26.2 kilometres (16.3 mi))

From highway 20, the David River flows over:

- 7.9 kilometres (4.9 mi) north in an agricultural zone, up to a country road;
- 3.5 kilometres (2.2 mi) (or 2.0 kilometres (1.2 mi) in a straight line) north-east winding through a forest area to the bridge located in the center of the village of Saint-Edmond-de-Grantham;
- 6.2 kilometres (3.9 mi) (or 3.1 kilometres (1.9 mi) in a straight line) towards the north, winding up to the Labbé stream;
- 8.6 kilometres (5.3 mi) (or 4.0 kilometres (2.5 mi) in a straight line) westward, winding through an agricultural zone to route 224 which connects the villages of Saint-Guillaume and Saint-Bonaventure.

Lower course of the river (segment of 27.3 kilometres (17.0 mi))

From Route 224, the David River flows over:

- 7.5 kilometres (4.7 mi) (or 3.4 kilometres (2.1 mi) in a direct line) west to the second rang road;
- 6.1 kilometres (3.8 mi) (or 3.3 kilometres (2.1 mi) in a direct line) winding up to the Rousseau stream (coming from the northeast);
- 3.1 kilometres (1.9 mi) (or 1.6 kilometres (0.99 mi) in a direct line) winding up to the Sainte-Cardine stream (coming from the west);
- 4.0 kilometres (2.5 mi) (or 2.3 kilometres (1.4 mi) in direct line) winding up to the bridge in the village of Saint-David-d'Yamaska;
- 6.6 kilometres (4.1 mi) (or 3.4 kilometres (2.1 mi) in a direct line) winding up to its mouth.

The David River flows onto the east bank of the Yamaska River at 3.5 kilometres (2.2 mi) upstream of the Camille-Parenteau bridge located at Yamaska and at 6.3 kilometres (3.9 mi) downstream from the village of Massueville.

== Toponymy ==
Formerly, this watercourse was designated "Rivière Saint-David".

The toponym “Rivière David” has been known since at least 1690 to designate this watercourse. The cartographer Joseph Bouchette, indicates this toponym on the map of Lower Canada, 1815. The "Dictionary of rivers and lakes of the province of Quebec (1914)" also indicates this toponym.

This toponym evokes the life work of Jacques David (Trois-Rivières, 1657 - Boucherville, 1708); the latter worked as a beaver trapper in this area.

The toponym "Rivière David" was officially registered on December 5, 1968, at the Commission de toponymie du Québec.

== See also ==
- List of rivers of Quebec
