= Saint-Théodore-d'Acton =

- Municipality
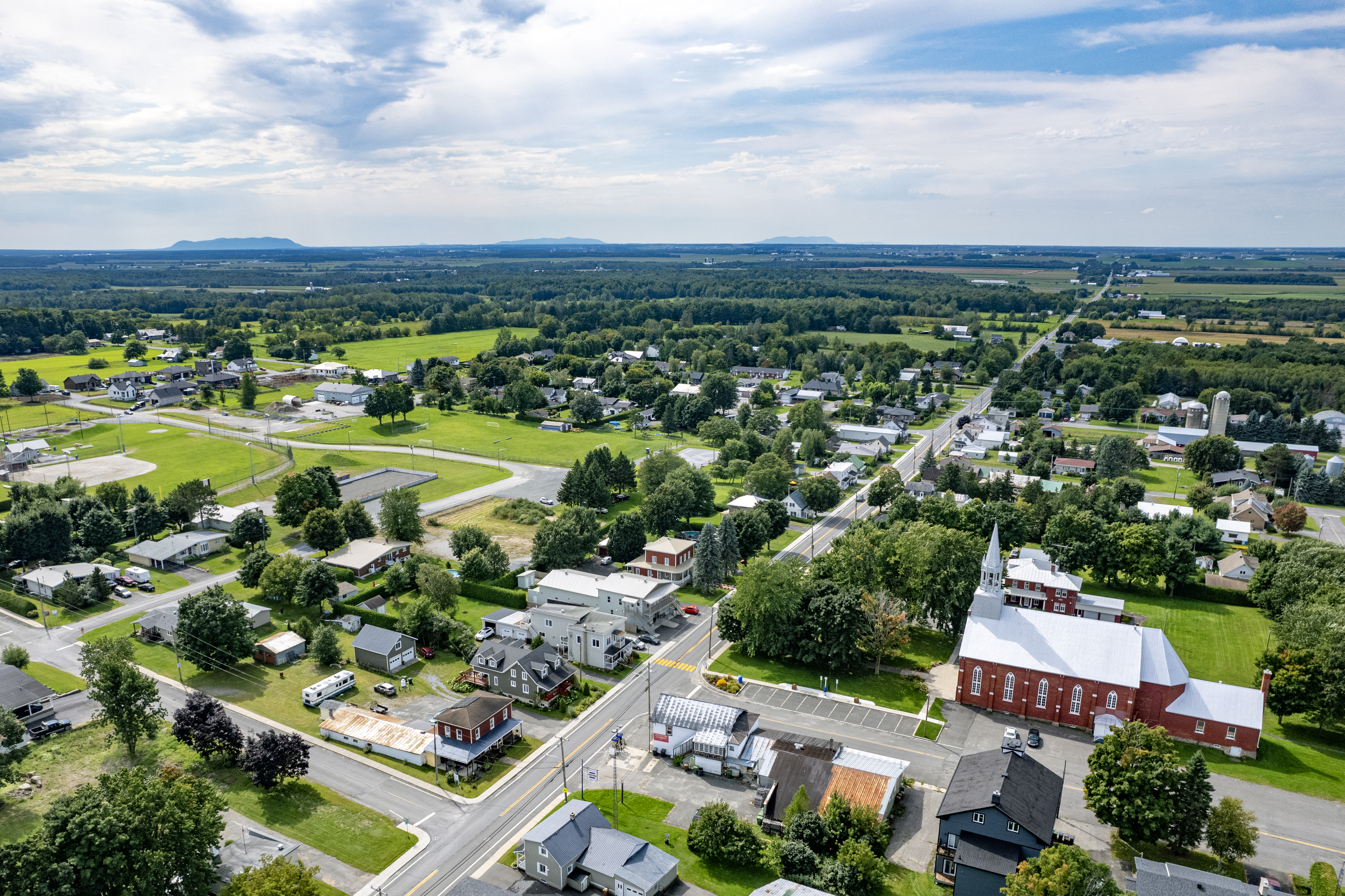
- Aerial view of Saint-Théodore-d'Acton

- Seal

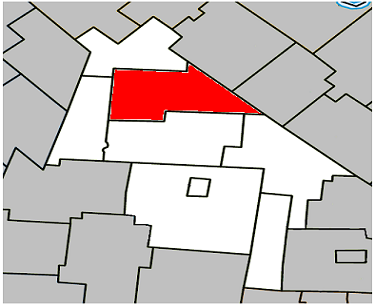
- Location within Acton RCM.

- Location in southern Quebec.
- Coordinates: 45°41′N 72°35′W
- Country: Canada
- Province: Quebec
- Region: Montérégie
- RCM: Acton
- Constituted: January 1, 1864

Government
  - Mayor: Guy Bond
  - Federal riding: Saint-Hyacinthe—Bagot—Acton
  - Prov. riding: Daniel-Johnson

Area
  - Total: 83.70 km^{2} (32.32 sq mi)
  - Land: 83.26 km^{2} (32.15 sq mi)

Population (2011)
  - Total: 1,471
  - Density: 17.7/km^{2} (46/sq mi)
  - Pop 2006-2011: ▼1.5%
  - Dwellings: 607
- Time zone: UTC−5 (EST)
  - Summer (DST): UTC−4 (EDT)
- Postal code(s): J0H 1Z0
- Area codes: 450 and 579
- Highways: R-139
- Website: www.st-theodore.com

Saint-Théodore-d’Acton (Saint Theodore of Acton) is a municipality in the Regional County Municipality of Acton, in the province of Quebec, Canada. The population as of the Canada 2011 Census was 1,471.

Within this municipality there is a small village, with the same name. In terms of legal jurisdiction, the village is part of the larger municipality and has no separate identity. The rest of the municipality is completely rural.

== Demographics ==
=== Population ===
Population trend:

Census	Population	Change (%)
2011	1,471	▼1.5%
2006	1,494	▼3.2%
2001	1,544	▼5.5%
1996	1,633	▲3.0%
1991	1,585	N/A

=== Language ===
Mother tongue language (2006)

Language	Population	Pct (%)
French only	1,420	95.62%
English only	0	0.00%
Both English and French	0	0.00%
Other languages	65	4.38%

== See also ==
- List of municipalities in Quebec
