= Acton Regional County Municipality =

Acton
- Regional county municipality
- Coordinates: 45°39′N 72°34′W
- Country: Canada
- Province: Quebec
- Region: Montérégie
- Effective: January 1, 1982
- County seat: Acton Vale
- Communities: List: City; Acton Vale; Municipalities; Béthanie; Saint-Théodore-d'Acton; Upton; Parishes; Saint-Nazaire-d'Acton; Sainte-Christine; Townships; Roxton Canton; Villages; Roxton Falls

Government
  - Type: Prefecture
  - Prefect: Jean-Marie Laplante

Area
  - Total: 583.00 km^{2} (225.10 sq mi)
  - Land: 579.80 km^{2} (223.86 sq mi)

Population (2016)
  - Total: 15,594
  - Density: 26.9/km^{2} (70/sq mi)
  - Change 2011-2016: ▲1.4%
  - Dwellings: 7,101
- Time zone: UTC−5 (EST)
  - Summer (DST): UTC−4 (EDT)
- Area codes: 450 and 579
- Website: www.mrcacton.qc.ca

Acton Regional County Municipality is a regional county municipality located in the Montérégie region of Quebec. The seat is Acton Vale.

Founded in 1982, the Acton Regional County Municipality is made up of eight smaller municipalities containing a little fewer than 16,000 people. The average population density is 26.9 per square kilometre. About half of the population is concentrated in the town of Acton Vale.

== Subdivisions ==
There are 8 subdivisions within the RCM:

Cities & Towns (1)

- Acton Vale

Municipalities (3)

- Béthanie
- Saint-Théodore-d'Acton
- Upton

Parishes (2)

- Saint-Nazaire-d'Acton
- Sainte-Christine

Townships (1)

- Roxton

Villages (1)

- Roxton Falls

== Demographics ==
Mother tongue from Canada 2016 Census

Language	Population	Pct (%)
French only	14,925	95.7%
English only	160	1.0%
Both English and French	55	0.4%
Other languages	455	2.9%

== Transportation ==
=== Access Routes ===
Highways and numbered routes that run through the municipality, including external routes that start or finish at the county border:

- Autoroutes
  - A-20 (TCH)
- Principal Highways
  - R-116
  - R-139
- Secondary Highways
  - R-211
  - R-222
  - R-241
- External Routes
  - None

== Attractions and Other Areas ==
La Campagnarde Trail

== See also ==
- List of regional county municipalities and equivalent territories in Quebec
