= Yamaska River =

River in Quebec, Canada

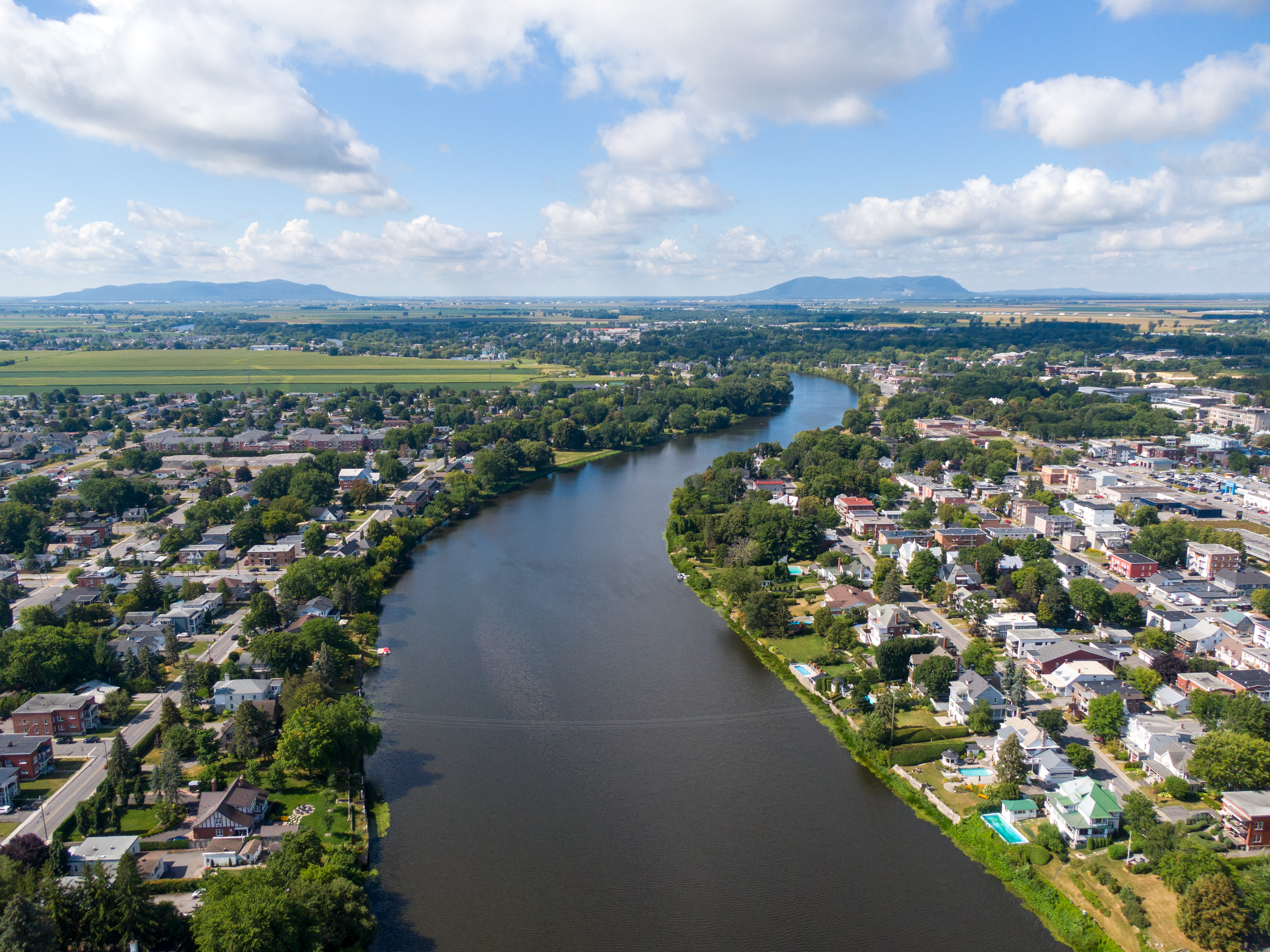
- Yamaska River in Saint-Hyacinthe

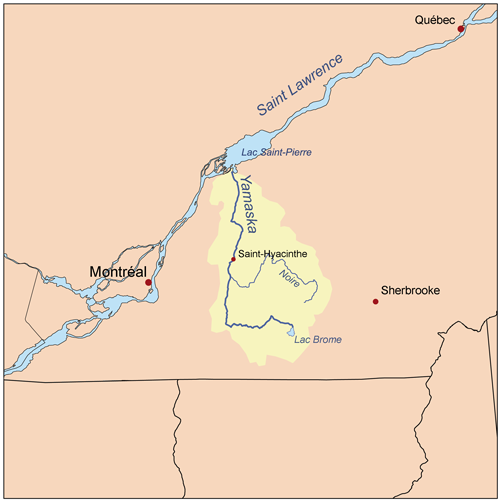
- Native name: Rivière Yamaska (French)

Location
- Country: Canada
- Province: Quebec
- Region: Montérégie, Centre-du-Québec
- City: Saint-Hyacinthe

Physical characteristics
- Source: Brome Lake
  - location: Brome Lake, Montérégie, Quebec, Canada
  - coordinates: 45°15′N 72°31′W
  - elevation: 194 m (636 ft)
- Mouth: Lac Saint-Pierre (Saint Lawrence River)
  - location: Saint-François-du-Lac, Centre-du-Québec, Quebec, Canada
  - coordinates: 46°06′50″N 72°56′13″W
- Length: 160 km (99 mi)
- Basin size: 4,784 km^{2} (1,847 sq mi)
- Discharge
  - location: Lac Saint-Pierre
  - average: 83 m^{3}/s (2,900 cu ft/s)

The Yamaska River (French: rivière Yamaska, pronounced [ʁivjɛʁ jamaska]) is a river in southern Quebec, Canada.

Sourcing water within the Eastern Townships, it ends its journey in Lake Saint-Pierre where it is a tributary to the Saint Lawrence River; altogether it is 177 km (110 mi) long. Crossing nearly twenty municipalities in its course, it is intrinsically linked to life around it as it is a primary source of fresh water where it passes; due to human use and adaptation, the river and its banks have become heavily altered over time, beginning around the time the first European settlers arrived to modern days.

Before exploitation, the river was rich with life. Urban, industrial, and intensive agricultural use have made it one of the most polluted rivers in Quebec, especially from agricultural waste and pesticides; nevertheless, many municipalities use it as their source for drinking water. Although the number of species of living organisms has greatly decreased, a tenacious ecosystem still thrives along many parts of the Yamaska, some efforts are made by the citizens of various municipalities to alter human impact on the environments that connect to the stream. The Yamaska is used for recreational activities such as fishing and many navigate its waters, though it is not used for swimming.

For many years the pollution issue has spawned environmental concern in places such as Granby, where citizens, environmental experts, municipal councilors, as well as groups and organizations work on conservation, study, inventory, and communication of ways to change an individual's impact on the river's health. These actions have led to the increase of community art and events aiming to speak for those who cannot, mainly animals and plants.

== Toponymy ==
The name Yamaska appeared in the 17th century, beforehand it was named "Rivière de Gennes" (French for River of Gennes) by Samuel de Champlain in 1609. When the lands known as seigneurie de Yamaska were granted to Michel Leneuf de La Vallière, the river's name was instead "rivière des Savanes". The word "Yamaska" could be sourced to Abenakis meaning "there are rushes off the coast" or "there is much hay", from yam or iyamitaw, respectively meaning off shore and much, and askaw, meaning hay or rushes. This Amerindian name references baie de Lavalilière (Lavallière Bay), at the river's mouth where vegetation grows abundantly in a marsh. The name could also be from Algonquian hia muskeg, it means "river of the savannas" or "river with muddy waters". Because of the nebulous Amerindian origin, this naming has been deformed (often in the form of Maska or Masca, after which the inhabitants of Saint-Hyacinthe are named). It was officially named Rivière Yamaska 5 December 1968.

== Geography ==
=== Hydrography ===
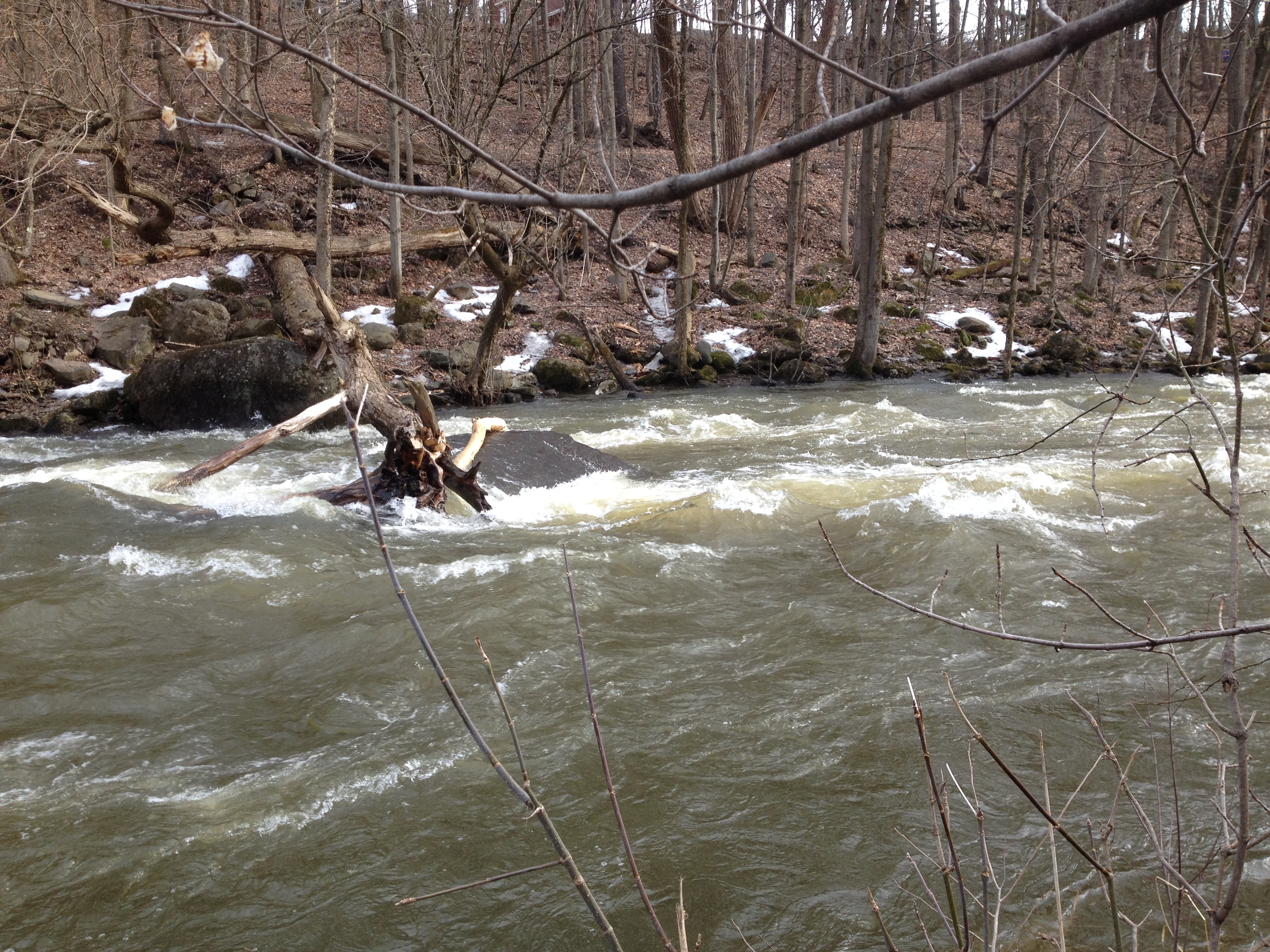

The drainage basin of the Yamaska measures 4,784 km^{2} (1,847 sq mi); its average debit at the end is of 87 m^{2} (940 sq ft), this is considered relatively slow compared to Richelieu at 330 m^{2} (3,600 sq ft) and Saint-François at 190 m^{2} (2,000 sq ft) rivers, the nearest streams; it is however subject to seasonal fluctuations (with a record flow of 887 m^{2} (9,550 sq ft) in the spring (linked to the snowmelt) and in the fall (caused by precipitation), and minimums of 0.9 m^{2} (9.7 sq ft) in winter and summer.

There are few bodies of water in the Yamaska's basin, only six are larger than one square kilometer, of these only three are natural: Brome, Roxton, and Waterloo lakes.

=== River's Course ===
Starting at an elevation of 193 m (633 ft) north of lac Brome, it flows westward until it reaches Farnham; this section is at the feet of the Appalachian Mountains, it receives two tributaries: North Yamaska River (French: Rivière Yamaska Nord) passing through Granby, and Yamaska South East River draining Cowansville, after which it turns northward and enters the Great Lakes–St. Lawrence Lowlands (lowlands of the Saint-Lawrence) and meets its main tributary Rivière Noire (Black River) at Saint-Damase, passing through its biggest agglomeration, Saint-Hyacinthe; it continues towards its mouth at Lake Saint Pierre, West of Saint François Bay.

=== Tributaries ===
Among its main tributaries are Noire, South-East Yamaska, and North Yamaska rivers.

River sub-basin	Left or right tributary (in downstream order)	Sub-basin surface area (km^{2})	Sub-basin under cultivation (percentage %)
Yamaska	n/a	1759	57.7
Yamaska Nord	right	303	28.2
Yamaska Sud-Est	left	411	22.5
Noire	right	1571	42.7
Salvail	left	206	53.7
David	right	326	59.8
Pot au Beurre	left	208	45.8

==== Left tributaries (West Shore) ====
- Rivière Pot au Beurre (Yamaska River tributary)
- Le Petit Chenail (Yamaska River tributary)
  - Saint-Louis River
- Salvail River
- South-West Yamaska River
- Yamaska South East River

==== Right tributaries (East Shore) ====
- North Yamaska River
- Rivière à la-Barbe
- Noire River
  - Rivière le Renne
  - Jaune River
  - Rouge River
- Chibouet River
- David River

=== Regional County Municipalities and local municipalities crossed ===
- Brome-Missisquoi: Lac-Brome, Bromont, Brigham, Farnham
- La Haute-Yamaska: Saint-Alphonse-de-Granby, Granby
- Rouville: Ange-Gardien, Saint-Césaire
- Les Maskoutains: Saint-Damase, Saint-Hyacinthe, Saint-Barnabé-Sud, Saint-Simon, Saint-Hugues, Saint-Louis, Saint-Marcel-de-Richelieu
- Pierre-De Saurel: Saint-Aimé, Massueville, Saint-David, Yamaska
- Nicolet-Yamaska: Saint-François-du-Lac

== Biodiversity ==
A varied fauna and flora exists along the Yamaska, reflecting the various regions it traverses; species of birds, fish, amphibians, reptiles, mammals, crustaceans, insect, fungi, lichen, algae and many more populate its waters, banks, and surrounding marshes. Pollution has greatly affected the nature that used to thrive in and around the river, reducing the number of species of fish from 70 to 33 between 1963 and 2003; to counter this the Quebec government proceeds to implement fish in the river to increase fishing as a sport.

The main fish cruising its waters are white sucker (Castostomus commersonii) and Cyprinidae; more polluted areas are occupied by brown bullhead (Ameiurus nebulosus). Species sought after for fishing include muskellunge (Esox masquinongy), Esox, black bass (Micropterus sp.), Sander, yellow perch (Perca flavescens), pumpkinseed (Lepomis gibbosus) and mud cat. Over the years the species added to the river for increase sport are the brown trout (Salmo trutta), rainbow trout (Oncorynchus mykiss), muskellunge, Sander, yellow perch, brown bullhead, smallmouth bass (Micropterus dolomieu), and brook trout (Salvelinus fontinalis).

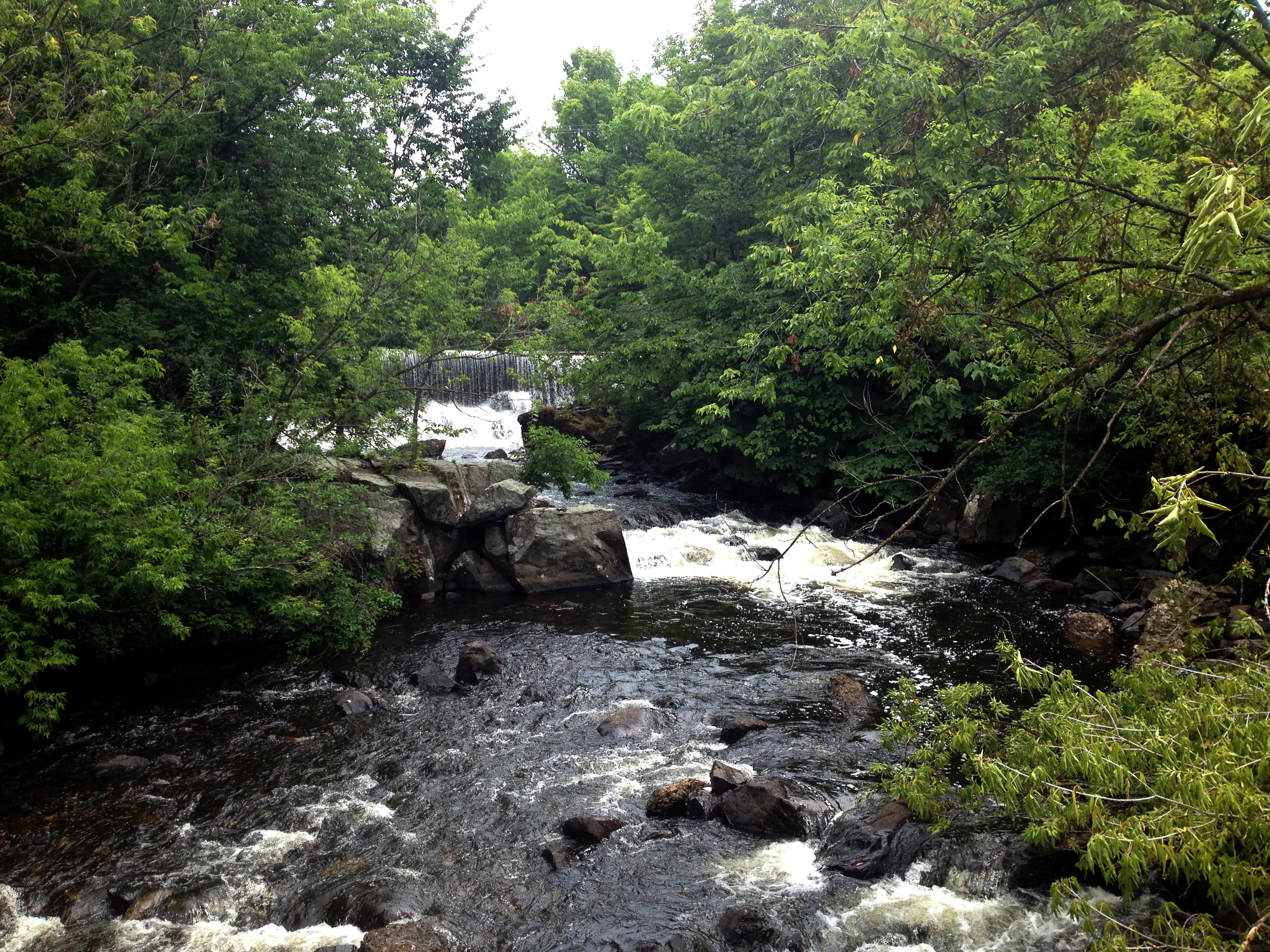
Sides of the Yamaska are covered in vegetation which offers refuge and food to a multitude of animals. What is more, beneath its waters are found equally diverse lifeforms.

Inventories carried at Mont Yamaska allowed to observe over fifteen species of amphibians and even reptiles (such as the painted turtle (Chrysemys picta) and common garter snake (Thamnophis sirtalis)). Common amphibians inventoried in the river are the dusky salamander (Desmognathus fucus), wood frog (Rana sylvatica), and the green frog (Rana clamitans). The Baie Lavalilière (Sainte-Anne-de-Sorel, Québec), located near the mouth of the river, is considered a very rich habitat for amphibians, although poaching of bullfrog (Rana catesbeiana), northern leopard frog (Rana pipiens), and green frog limit their population.

== Citizen Collective Art Movement ==
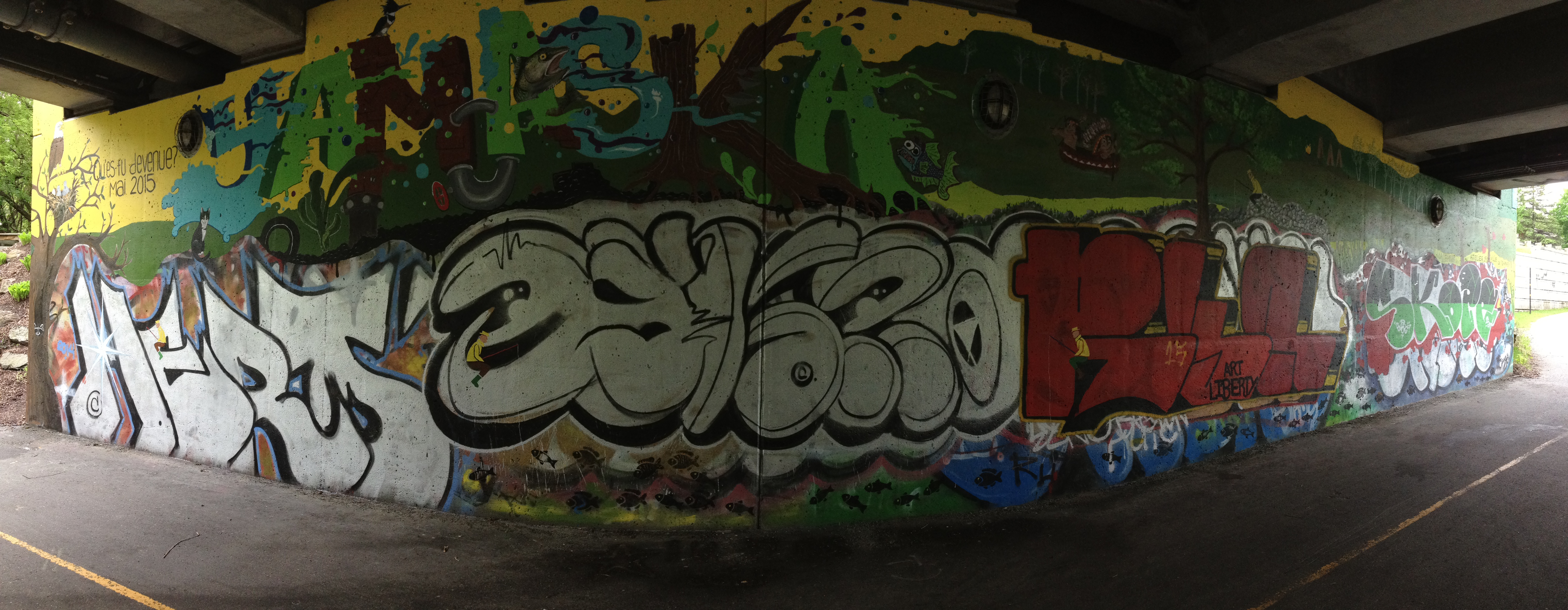
A portion of the mural Qu'es-tu devenu, Yamaska? under Patrick-Hackett bridge in Granby, Quebec.

11 May 2013 saw the inauguration of two collective artworks "URGENCE YAMASKA" (Yamaska Emergency) and "LA YAMASKA, C'EST NOUS..." (The Yamaska, it is us...), during the community art project Art-Yamaska; the art is said to be issue of a collective reflection about the river's health and depicts several clear environmental messages. The project aims education of ecological awareness linked to the Yamaska's health. Along with the artwork's public exposition on Granby's water pumping station, the project included poetry reading, a photography exposition, and several mural and mosaic workshops, culminating in festivities on the river's celebration day in 2013. Since their installment, the collective murals have gained much renown and visibility due to their location just off a popular cycling network (a large portion of it within meters of the river). In May 2015, a new artful message followed in the Art-Yamaska project with the creation of "Qu'es-tu devenu Yamaska?" (What have you become, Yamaska?) a few kilometers downstream the same cycling track as the previous mural. Once more, workshops were organized by the art and creativity non-profit organization Atelier 19 to allow a group of youth to invent an environmental message to be posted underneath and on the sides of Patrick-Hackett bridge; the place is famous for its vandalism in the form of graffiti art, the message is thus expressed conjointly and with inspiration from that art movement.

== See also ==
- List of rivers of Quebec
