= Saint-Nazaire-d'Acton, Quebec =

Saint-Nazaire-d'Acton
- Parish municipality
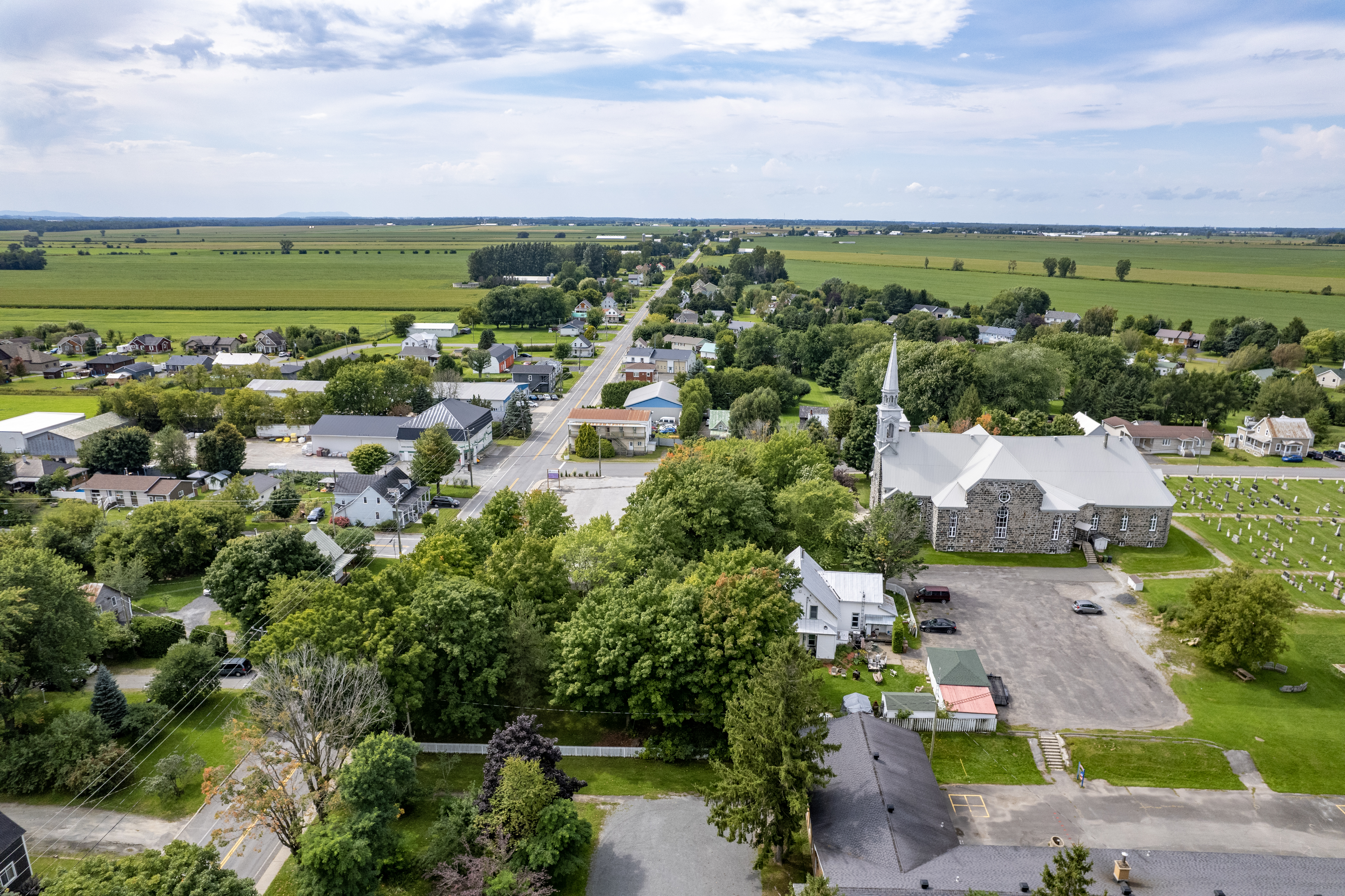
- Aerial view of Saint-Nazaire-d'Acton

- Coat of arms

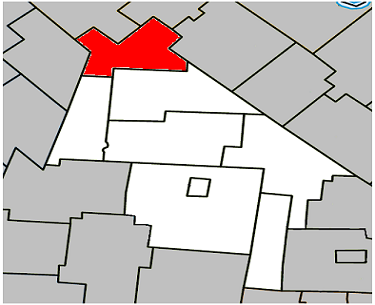
- Location within Acton RCM.

- Location in southern Quebec.
- Coordinates: 45°44′N 72°37′W
- Country: Canada
- Province: Quebec
- Region: Montérégie
- RCM: Acton
- Constituted: January 8, 1894

Government
  - Mayor: Kaven Delarosbil
  - Federal riding: Saint-Hyacinthe—Bagot—Acton
  - Prov. riding: Daniel-Johnson

Area
  - Total: 58.20 km^{2} (22.47 sq mi)
  - Land: 57.94 km^{2} (22.37 sq mi)

Population (2011)
  - Total: 826
  - Density: 14.3/km^{2} (37/sq mi)
  - Pop 2006-2011: ▼0.7%
  - Dwellings: 344
- Time zone: UTC−5 (EST)
  - Summer (DST): UTC−4 (EDT)
- Postal code(s): J0H 1V0
- Area code: 819

Saint-Nazaire-d'Acton is a parish municipality in central Quebec, Canada in Acton Regional County Municipality. The population as of the Canada 2011 Census was 826.

== Demographics ==
In the 2021 Census of Population conducted by Statistics Canada, Saint-Nazaire-d'Acton had a population of 880 living in 361 of its 374 total private dwellings, a change of −0.5% from its 2016 population of 884. With a land area of 58.04 km^{2} (22.41 sq mi), it had a population density of 15.2/km^{2} (39.3/sq mi) in 2021.

Population trend:

Census	Population	Change (%)
2011	826	▼0.7%
2006	832	▼8.1%
2001	905	▼2.9%
1996	932	▲4.4%
1991	893	N/A

Mother tongue language (2006)

Language	Population	Pct (%)
French only	800	95.81%
English only	10	1.20%
Both English and French	0	0.00%
Other languages	25	2.99%

== Communities ==
- Royville
- Saint-Nazaire

== See also ==
- List of parish municipalities in Quebec
