= Marie-Lacoste-Gérin-Lajoie =

Quebec electoral district

Provincial electoral district
- Legislature: National Assembly of Quebec
MNA
Natalie Bisaillon
Parti Québécois
- District created: 2026
- First contested: 2026
- Last contested: 2026

Demographics
- Census division: Drummond

Marie-Lacoste-Gérin-Lajoie is a provincial electoral district in the Centre-du-Québec region of Quebec, Canada that elects members to the National Assembly of Quebec.

It includes part of the town of Drummondville, the municipalities of Durham-Sud, L’Avenir, Lefebvre, Saint-Bonaventure, Saint-Edmond-de-Grantham, Saint-Eugène, Saint-Germain-de-Grantham, Saint-Guillaume and Wickham and the parishes of Saint-Majorique-de-Grantham and Saint-Pie-de-Guire..

It was created for the 2026 election from parts of the Johnson, Nicolet-Bécancour and Drummond–Bois-Francs electoral districts. Its name refers to Marie Lacoste (1867-1945) (also known as Marie Gérin-Lajoie).

== Members of the National Assembly ==
Legislature	Years	Member	Party
Riding created from Johnson, Nicolet-Bécancour and Drummond–Bois-Francs
44th	2026–Present	Natalie Bisaillon	Parti Québécois

== Election results ==
2026 Quebec general election
** Preliminary results — Not yet official **
Party	Candidate	Votes	%	±%
Parti Québécois	Natalie Bisaillon	11,323	36.13	
Conservative	Laura Tremblay	8,553	27.29	
Liberal	Alexandra Houle	4,612	14.72	
Coalition Avenir Québec	Patrick Saindon	4,305	13.74	
Québec solidaire	Sébastien Bage	2,160	6.89	
Climat Québec	Mathieu Fillion	153	0.49	
Independent	Sylvain Marcoux	117	0.37	
Démocratie directe	Mario Roy	115	0.37	
Total valid votes				
Total rejected ballots				
Turnout			68.75	
Electors on the lists				
Source: Élections Québec

2022 Quebec general election redistributed results
Party	Vote	%
Coalition Avenir Québec	15,067	51.78
Conservative	4,543	15.61
Parti Québécois	4,247	14.60
Québec solidaire	4,009	13.78
Liberal	1,051	3.61
Others	179	0.62
