= Blanche River (Bourbon River tributary) =

River in Centre-du-Québec, Quebec (Canada)

- Native name: Rivière Blanche (French)

Location
- Country: Canada
- Province: Quebec
- Region: Centre-du-Québec
- MRC: Bécancour Regional County Municipality

Physical characteristics
- Source: Agricultural streams
  - location: Saint-Pierre-Baptiste
  - coordinates: 46.245°N 71.61916°W
  - elevation: 283 m (928 ft)
- Mouth: Bourbon River
  - location: Plessisville
  - coordinates: 46.19472°N 71.76472°W
  - elevation: 160 m (520 ft)
- Length: 8.3 km (5.2 mi)

Basin features
- Progression: Bourbon River, Bécancour River, St. Lawrence River
- Tributaries
  - left: (upstream)
  - right: (upstream)

The Blanche river (French: rivière Blanche, pronounced [ʁivjɛʁ blɑ̃ʃ], lit. 'White River') is a tributary of the Bourbon River which flows into the Bécancour River.

The Blanche river flows in the municipalities of Saint-Pierre-Baptiste, Laurierville (Sainte-Julie sector) and Plessisville, in the L'Érable Regional County Municipality (MRC), in the administrative region of Centre-du-Québec, in province of Quebec, in Canada.

== Geography ==
The main neighboring hydrographic slopes of the Blanche River are:

- north side: Bécancour River, Bourbon River, Manningham stream, Noire River;
- east side: Bécancour River, Noire River, McKenzie River;
- south side: Moulin brook, Charles brook, Bulstrode River;
- west side: Savane stream, Bourbon River, Bulstrode River, Bécancour River.

The Blanche River has its source at Lac Camille (length: 0.8 kilometres (0.50 mi); altitude: 284 metres (932 ft)), located in Saint-Pierre-Baptiste. This lake is located 6.2 kilometres (3.9 mi) south of the village of Laurierville and 10.7 kilometres (6.6 mi) east of downtown Plessisville.

From its source, the Blanche River flows on 8.3 kilometres (5.2 mi) in the following segments:

- 0.2 kilometres (0.12 mi) westward, up to the municipal limit of Laurierville (Sainte-Julie sector);
- 0.8 kilometres (0.50 mi) towards the west, crossing the southern part of the territory of Laurierville¸ (Sainte-Julie sector);
- 2.4 kilometres (1.5 mi) towards the southwest, crossing the northern part of the territory of Saint-Pierre-Baptiste, passing north of Mont Apic, up to the municipal limit of Plessisville;
- 0.6 kilometres (0.37 mi) north-westerly, in the municipality of Plessisville, to the Lachance road bridge;
- 3.2 kilometres (2.0 mi) southwest, to route 165;
- 1.1 kilometres (0.68 mi) towards the southwest, until its confluence.

The Blanche river empties on the south-eastern bank of the Bourbon River downstream of the "Savane stream", south of the village of Plessisville.

== Toponymy ==
The toponym "rivière Blanche" was made official on March 6, 1970, at the Commission de toponymie du Québec.

== See also ==
- List of rivers of Quebec
