= Perdrix River (Bécancour River tributary) =

River in Centre-du-Québec, Quebec (Canada)

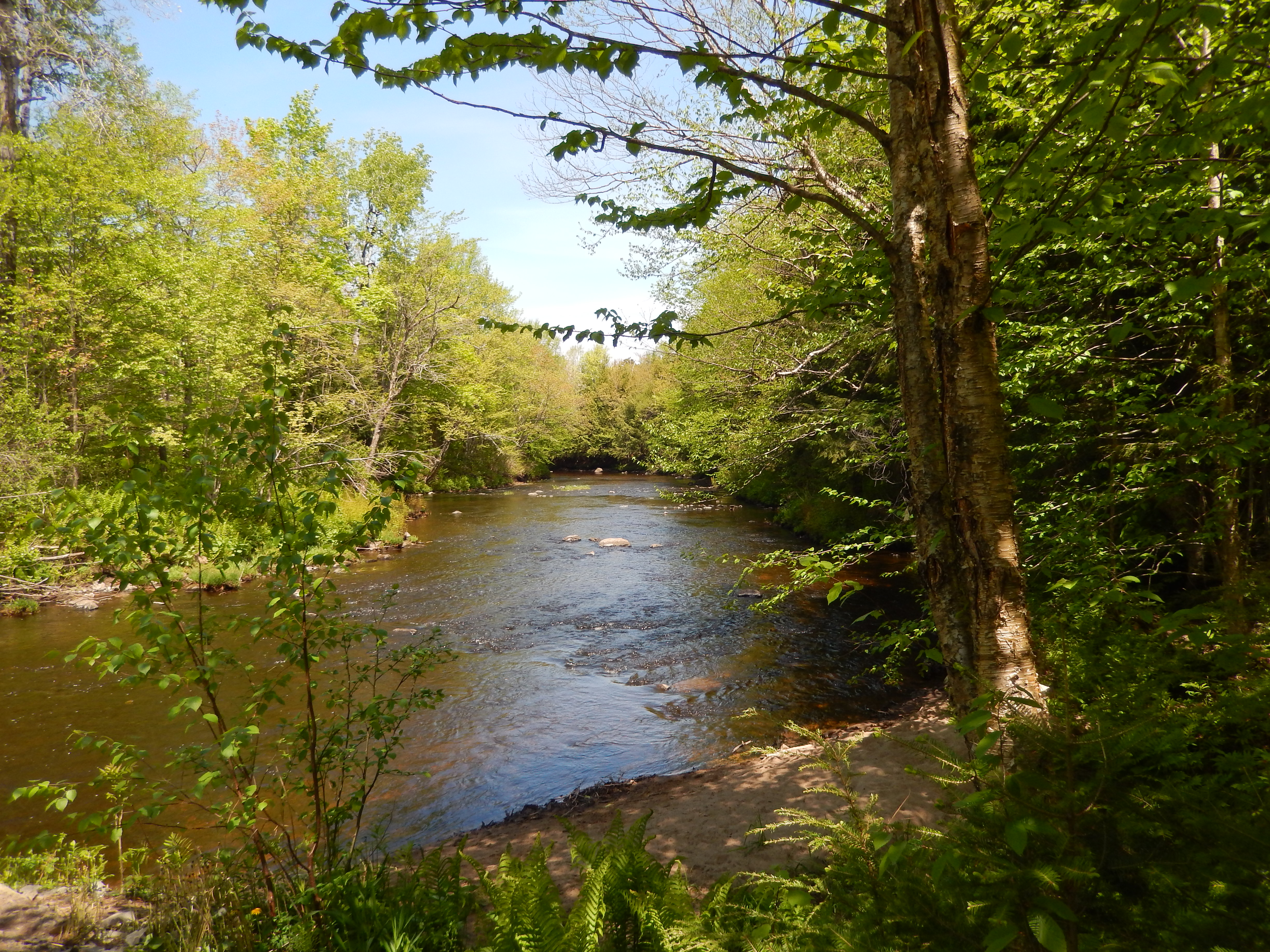
- Rivière Noire in the Grandes-Coulées regional park
- Native name: Rivière Perdrix (French)

Location
- Country: Canada
- Province: Quebec
- Region: Centre-du-Québec
- MRC: L'Érable Regional County Municipality

Physical characteristics
- Source: Agricultural Streams
  - location: Laurierville
  - coordinates: 46.30299°N 71.712656°W
  - elevation: 139 m (456 ft)
- Mouth: Noire River
  - location: Notre-Dame-de-Lourdes
  - coordinates: 46.30083°N 71.78972°W
  - elevation: 119 m (390 ft)
- Length: 7.9 km (4.9 mi)

Basin features
- Progression: Noire River, Bécancour River, St. Lawrence River
- Tributaries
  - left: (upstream)
  - right: (upstream)

The Perdrix River (in French: rivière Perdrix) is a tributary of the Noire River which is a tributary of the Bécancour River. It flows in the municipalities of Laurierville, Plessisville and Notre-Dame-de-Lourdes, in the L'Érable Regional County Municipality (MRC), in the administrative region of Centre-du-Québec, in Quebec, in Canada.

== Geography ==
The main neighboring hydrographic slopes of the Perdrix river are:

- north side: Noire River, Bécancour River;
- east side: Bécancour River;
- south side: Laurendeau stream, McKenzie River, Bécancour River;
- west side: Noire River (Bécancour River tributary), Bourbon River, Bécancour River.

The Perdrix river has its source at the limit in the municipality of Laurierville. This zone is located 3.2 kilometres (2.0 mi) south of the Bécancour River, 3.6 kilometres (2.2 mi) west of the center of the village of Laurierville.

From its head area, the Perdrix River flows over 7.9 kilometres (4.9 mi) divided into the following segments:

- 1.2 kilometres (0.75 mi) westward, up to the limit of the municipality of Plessisville;
- 5.1 kilometres (3.2 mi) north-west, up to the municipal limit of Notre-Dame-de-Lourdes;
- 1.6 kilometres (0.99 mi) west, up to the mouth.

The Perdrix river empties on the east bank of the Noire River (Bécancour River tributary) at 0.6 kilometres (0.37 mi) upstream from the confluence of the Barbue River and 3.5 kilometres (2.2 mi) upstream of the (route 265) bridge from Notre-Dame-de-Lourdes.

== Toponymy ==
The partridge (in French: Perdrix) is a very common wild bird species in Canada.

The toponym "rivière Perdrix" was made official on December 5, 1968, at the Commission de toponymie du Québec.

== See also ==
- List of rivers of Quebec
