= Barbue River =

River in Centre-du-Québec, Quebec (Canada)

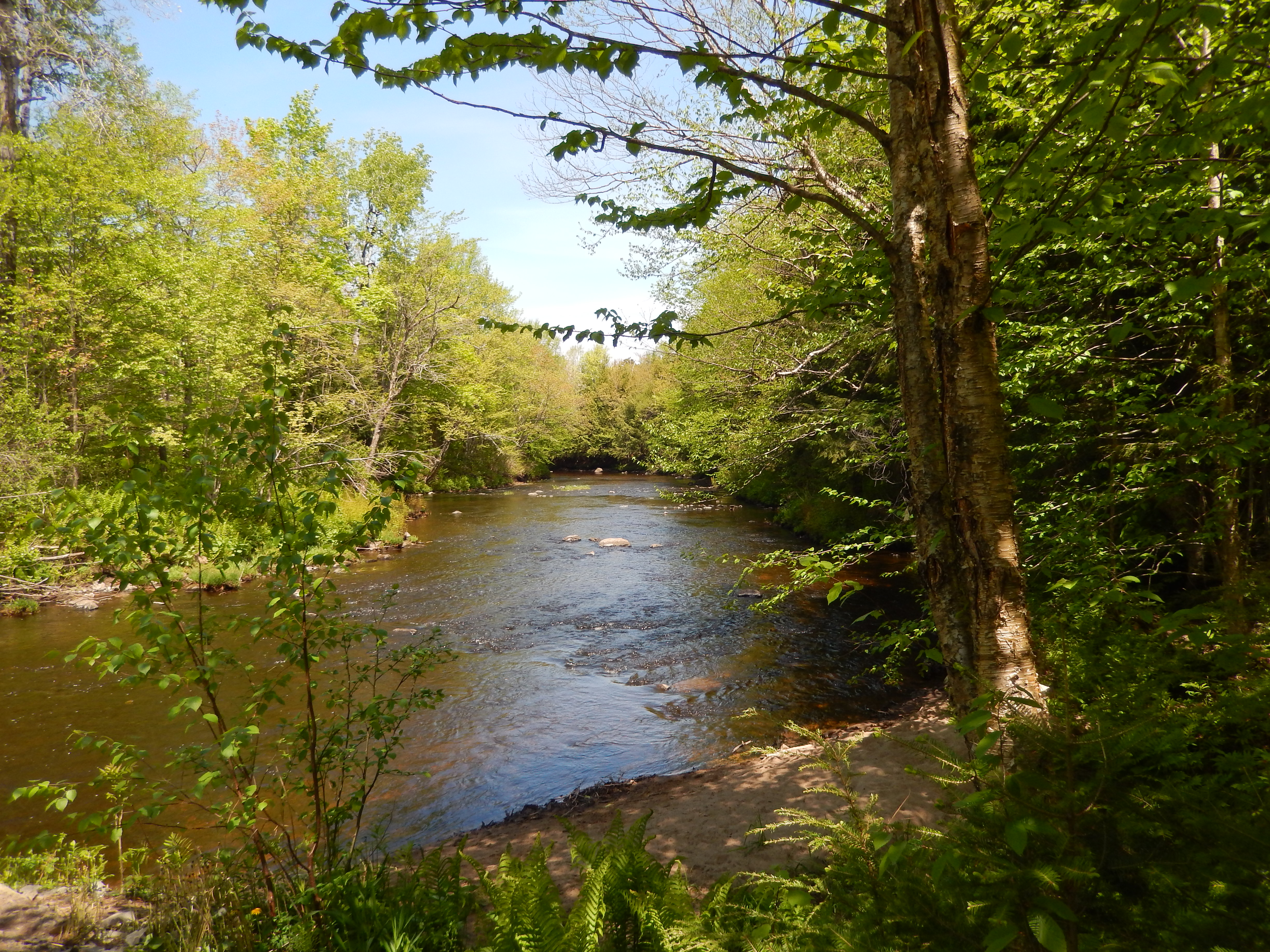
- Rivière Noire in the Grandes-Coulées regional park
- Native name: Rivière Barbue (French)

Location
- Country: Canada
- Province: Quebec
- Region: Centre-du-Québec
- MRC: L'Érable Regional County Municipality

Physical characteristics
- Source: Agricultural Streams
  - location: Laurierville
  - coordinates: 46.325888°N 71.632507°W
  - elevation: 149 m (489 ft)
- Mouth: Noire River
  - location: Notre-Dame-de-Lourdes
  - coordinates: 46.30695°N 71.78917°W
  - elevation: 118 m (387 ft)
- Length: 15.8 km (9.8 mi)

Basin features
- Progression: Noire River, Bécancour River, St. Lawrence River
- Tributaries
  - left: (upstream) ruisseau Pierre-Bergeron, ruisseau Mracoux, ruisseau André-Caron, ruisseau du Septième Rang
  - right: (upstream) ruisseau Roger-Gingras-Sud, ruisseau Jos-Bradette

The Barbue River (in French: rivière Barbue) is a tributary of the Noire River which is a tributary of the Bécancour River. It flows in the municipalities of Laurierville and Notre-Dame-de-Lourdes, in the L'Érable Regional County Municipality (MRC), in the administrative region of Centre-du-Québec, in Quebec, in Canada.

== Geography ==
The main neighboring hydrographic slopes of the Barbue River are:

- north side: Bécancour River;
- east side: Bécancour River;
- south side: Perdrix River, Noire River, McKenzie River, Bécancour River;
- west side: Noire River, Bécancour River.

The Barbue River rises at the boundary between the municipalities of Laurierville and Lyster. This area is located 2.6 kilometres (1.6 mi) south of the Bécancour River, 3.4 kilometres (2.1 mi) south of the village bridge of Lyster and 4.9 kilometres (3.0 mi) northeast of the center of the village of Laurierville.

From its source, the Barbue River flows on 15.8 kilometres (9.8 mi) in the following segments:

- 4.3 kilometres (2.7 mi) southwest, to route 116, in the village of Sainte-Julie Station;
- 2.3 kilometres (1.4 mi) towards the north, passing through the village, making a loop towards the west, to the confluence of the Roger-Gingras-Sud stream;
- 6.0 kilometres (3.7 mi) westward, up to the limit between the municipalities of Notre-Dame-de-Lourdes, Plessisville and Laurierville;
- 3.2 kilometres (2.0 mi) westward, up to its confluence.

The Barbue River flows into a bend in the river on the east bank of the Noire River at 2.9 kilometres (1.8 mi) upstream of the (route 265) of Notre-Dame-de-Lourdes.

== Toponymy ==
The toponym "rivière Barbue" was made official on December 5, 1968, at the Commission de toponymie du Québec.

== See also ==
- List of rivers of Quebec
