= Noire River (Bécancour River tributary) =

River in Centre-du-Québec, Quebec (Canada)

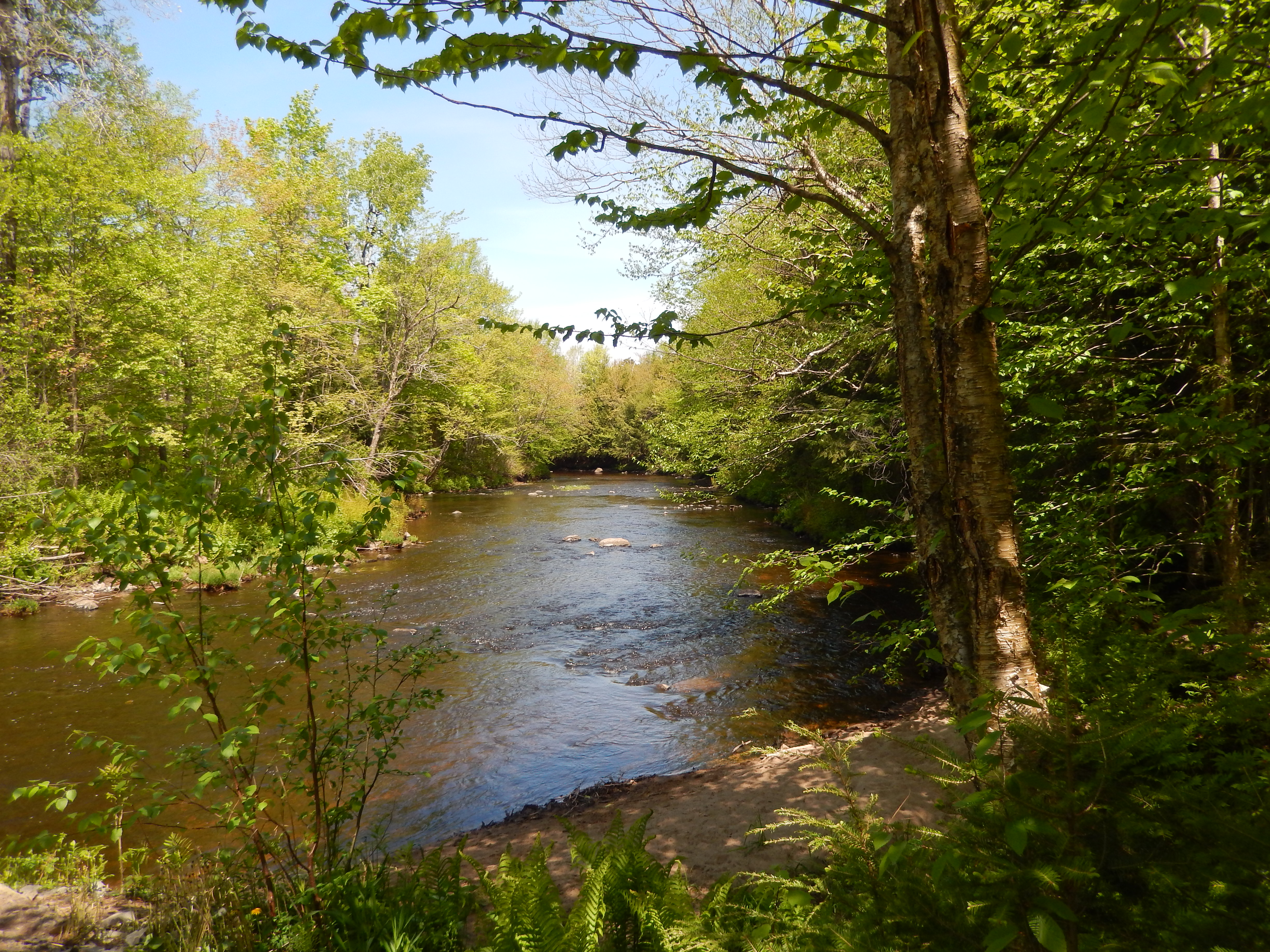
- Rivière Noire dans le parc régional des Grandes-Coulées
- Native name: Rivière Noire (French)

Location
- Country: Canada
- Province: Quebec
- Region: Centre-du-Québec
- MRC: L'Érable Regional County Municipality

Physical characteristics
- Source: Forested streams
  - location: Sainte-Sophie-d'Halifax
  - coordinates: 46.299316°N 71.559811°W
  - elevation: 183 m (600 ft)
- Mouth: Bécancour River
  - location: Bécancour
  - coordinates: 46.30528°N 71.87083°W
  - elevation: 104 m (341 ft)
- Length: 42.4 km (26.3 mi)

Basin features
- Progression: Bécancour River, St. Lawrence River
- Tributaries
  - left: (upstream) ruisseau Montreuil, ruisseau Laurendeau, ruisseau Manningham, ruisseau Fernand-Bédard, ruisseau Paradis, ruisseau Benoit-Lemelin.
  - right: (upstream) ruisseau Magella, Barbue River, Perdrix River, ruisseau Beaudet, ruisseau Isabelle, ruisseau Bilodeau, ruisseau Côté, ruisseau André-Lemelin, ruisseau Alfred-Therrien, ruisseau Samson, ruisseau Beaudoin.

The Noire River (in English: Black River) is a tributary of the Bécancour River which is a tributary of the south shore of the St. Lawrence River. The Noire River flows through the municipalities of Inverness, Laurierville, Plessisville and Notre-Dame-de-Lourdes, in the L'Érable Regional County Municipality (MRC), in the administrative region of Centre-du-Québec, in Quebec, in Canada.

== Geography ==
The main neighboring hydrographic slopes of the Black River are:

- north side: Bécancour River;
- east side: Bécancour River;
- south side: McKenzie River, Bécancour River, Gingras waterway;
- west side: Bourbon River, Bécancour River.

The Black River has its source in the municipality of Inverness, at 1.9 kilometres (1.2 mi) southwest of the Bécancour River, at 6.0 kilometres (3.7 mi) north of the village center of Inverness and 9.1 kilometres (5.7 mi) east of the village center of Laurierville.

From its source, the Black River flows on 42.4 kilometres (26.3 mi) in the following segments:

Upper course of the river

- 6.1 kilometres (3.8 mi) north-west, then turn west, up to the municipal limit of Laurierville;
- 5.7 kilometres (3.5 mi) north-west, then west, to the bridge located south of the village of Laurierville;
- 4.1 kilometres (2.5 mi) westward, passing south of the village of Laurierville, up to the municipal limit of Plessisville;
- 4.1 kilometres (2.5 mi) west, to the bridge at the mouth of Kelly Lake that the river crosses southwest on 1.6 kilometres (0.99 mi);

Lower course of the river

- 5.7 kilometres (3.5 mi) north-west, forming a loop to the west and another to the east, to the road;
- 6.2 kilometres (3.9 mi) north-west, then north, to the municipal limit of Notre-Dame-de-Lourdes;
- 1.7 kilometres (1.1 mi) northward, to the confluence of the Perdrix River;
- 0.7 kilometres (0.43 mi) northward, to the confluence of the Barbue River;
- 3.0 kilometres (1.9 mi) westward, to the route 265 bridge;
- 5.1 kilometres (3.2 mi) westward, up to its confluence.

The Black River empties on the south shore of the Bécancour River at 3.5 kilometres (2.2 mi) downstream from the bridge (route 265) of Notre-Dame-de-Lourdes, 3.0 kilometres (1.9 mi) upstream of the hamlet "Plage-Patry" and 5.4 kilometres (3.4 mi) in upstream of the confluence of the Bourbon River.

== Toponymy ==
The toponym "rivière Noire" was made official on December 5, 1968, at the Commission de toponymie du Québec.

== See also ==
- List of rivers of Quebec
