= Bourbon River =

River in Centre-du-Québec, Quebec (Canada)

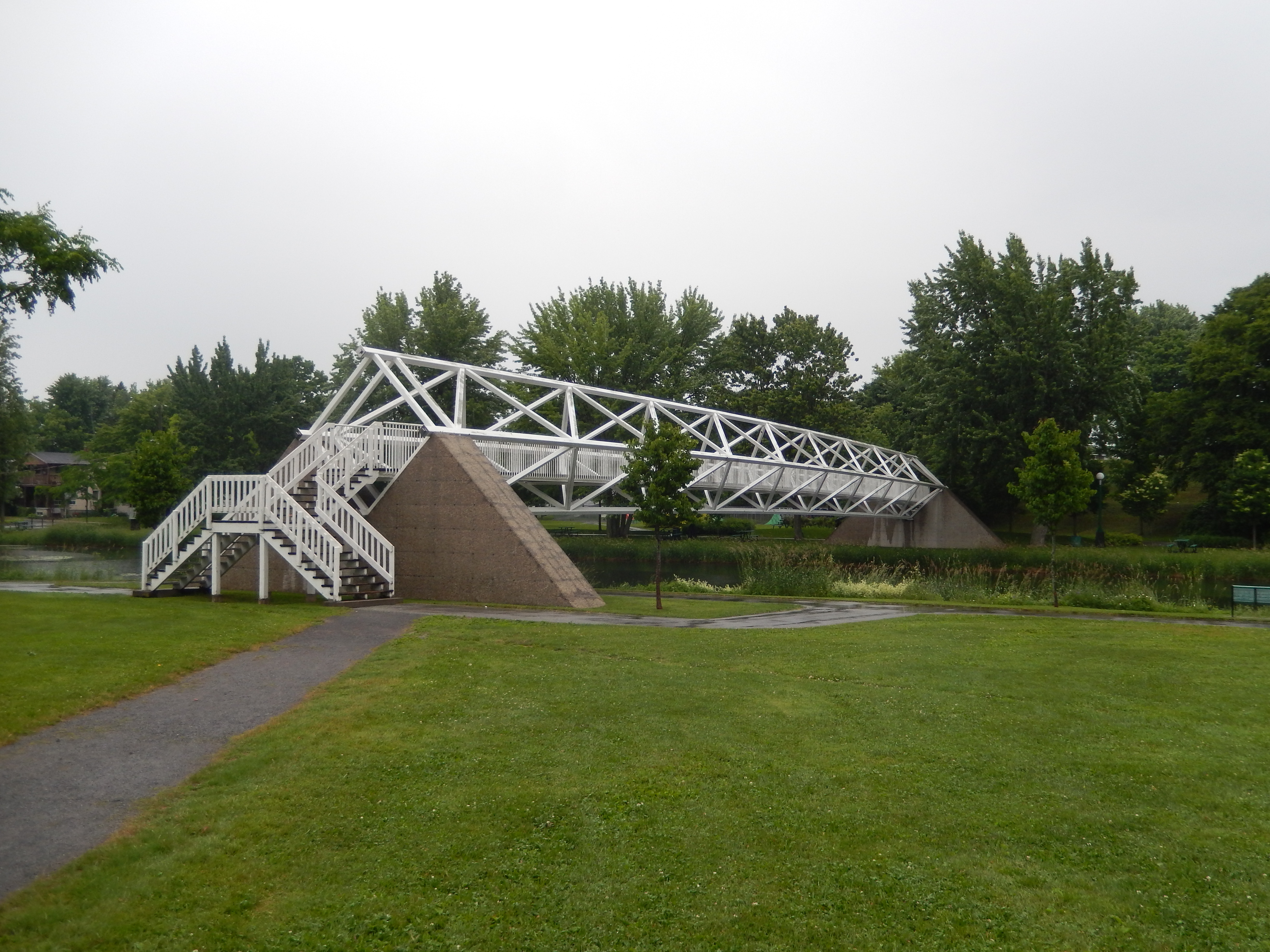
- Armand-Vaillancourt footbridge on the Bourbon river in Plessisville
- Native name: Rivière Bourbon (French)

Location
- Country: Canada
- Province: Quebec
- Region: Centre-du-Québec
- MRC: L'Érable Regional County Municipality

Physical characteristics
- Source: Forest streams
  - location: Sainte-Sophie-d'Halifax
  - coordinates: 46.1507901°N 71.666691°W
  - elevation: 398 m (1,306 ft)
- Mouth: Bécancour River
  - location: Princeville
  - coordinates: 46.27972°N 71.91972°W
  - elevation: 100 m (330 ft)
- Length: 37.9 km (23.5 mi)

Basin features
- Progression: Bécancour River, St. Lawrence River
- Tributaries
  - left: (upstream) cours d'eau Bellevue, ruisseau Vigneault, ruisseau Dubois, ruisseau Pellerin, ruisseau de la Savane, ruisseau Vigneault-Brassard
  - right: (upstream) ruisseau Gosselin, ruisseau Fournier, cours d'eau Lemieux, Blanche River (Bourbon River tributary), ruisseau Bergeron-Breton, ruisseau Vigneault-Grégoire

The Bourbon River (in French: rivière Bourbon) is a tributary of the Bécancour River. It flows in the municipalities of Sainte-Sophie-d'Halifax, Plessisville, Notre-Dame-de-Lourdes and Princeville, in the L'Érable Regional County Municipality (MRC), in the administrative region of Centre-du-Quebec, Quebec, Canada.

== Geography ==
The main neighboring hydrographic slopes of the Bourbon River are:

- north side: Bécancour River;
- east side: Bécancour River, Noire River;
- south side: Blanche River, Bulstrode River;
- west side: Jacques stream, Bécancour River.

The Bourbon River takes its source from streams located in the forest area south of Plessisville.

From its source, the Bourbon River flows on 37.9 kilometres (23.5 mi) in the following segments:

- 2.3 kilometres (1.4 mi) west, in the municipality of Sainte-Sophie-d'Halifax, to the village bridge of Sainte-Sophie-d'Halifax;
- 3.9 kilometres (2.4 mi) north-west, crossing the village, to the municipal limit of Plessisville;
- 2.3 kilometres (1.4 mi) north to a road;
- 1.7 kilometres (1.1 mi) north-west, up to the confluence of "Ruisseau de la Savane";
- 3.2 kilometres (2.0 mi) north, up to the bridge located south of the village of Plessisville;
- 2.3 kilometres (1.4 mi) northwesterly, crossing seven bridges in Plessisville;
- 8.0 kilometres (5.0 mi) north-west, up to the municipal limit of Notre-Dame-de-Lourdes;
- 9.4 kilometres (5.8 mi) westward, winding through the municipality of Notre-Dame-de-Lourdes and passing south a large area of marsh, up to the municipal limit of Princeville;
- 4.8 kilometres (3.0 mi) westward, winding through the municipality of Princeville and passing between two areas of marshland, to its mouth.

The Bourbon river empties on the southeast bank of the Bécancour River upstream of the confluence of the Jacques brook, downstream of the hamlet Plage-Patry and downstream of the confluence of the Noire River. This confluence is located north of the village of Plessisville.

== Toponymy ==
In 1815, the surveyor and geographer Joseph Bouchette designated this watercourse on his map under the toponym "Rivière Blanche". This name of the river was still in use during the second half of the 19th century, that is to say at the beginning of the colonization of this sector. At the beginning of 21st century, the residents of the sector still designate this watercourse "Rivière Blanche", despite the officialization of its name "Bourbon" in 1924 by the "Commission de géographie du Québec", following the recommendation of the "Geographic Commission of Canada".

Some theses are known on the possible origin of the hydronym "Bourbon". The first supposes a relationship with a descendant of a pioneer who came to New France in the 17th century. Note that a man named Merdieu dit Bourbon left his traces in archival documents in the Saint-Gabriel and Notre-Dame-des-Anges seigneuries, in the first half of the 18th century. A second thesis makes a link with the royal house of Bourbon. A third thesis assumes that the Bourbon hydronym is derived from the Gallic collective name Borvo or Bormo designating the divinity of thermal springs. The words mud and mud have the same root; these words could have initially inspired the authors of this name.

A fourth thesis supposes that this toponym evokes a member of the French royal family who immigrated to Canada in 1795. This thesis is based on a writing from the "Bulletin des Recherches Historiques" indicating: "Following the French Revolution, thousands of priests, estimated at more than 20,000, left France, rather than taking an oath to the civil constitution of the clergy. Several of them took refuge in England, from where 40 of them obtained permission to immigrate to Canada, including a certain priest named Courtin, who came in 1795 accompanied by " a young prince of royal blood, natural son of Louis XV, brother of the Grand Dauphin, consequently uncle of Louis XVI, Louis XVIII and Charles X. Jean Louis de Bourbon - that was his name - went incognito in Canada, and Lived there under a borrowed name (Jean-Baptiste Decaraffe), practicing the humble profession of goldsmith in some parish in the valley of the Chambly River, where he married”. This information mentioned in the Bulletin des Recherches Historiques, volume 9, 1903 pages 59 and 60, by Father A.-H. Gosselin, tells us that the latter had received information, relevant to this story, from the confessor of one of the silversmith's daughters, who had told him that her father had confessed his identity on his deathbed; the old woman mentioned above all the fact that the collar had been cut off to one of her parents (Louis XVI), because there was a train from above. In addition, Jean-Louis de Bourbon carried the cross of Saint-Louis: this cross was bequeathed to a poor parish in the Eastern cantons, and served to adorn the monstrance of the Blessed Sacrament. Another source from the Bulletin des Recherches Historiques, volume 28, Lévis, 1922 (therefore 2 years before the name change), p. 220-2 recalls that his daughter, in question here, was called Louise LeBourbon, she was buried in the cemetery of Saint-Valère-de-Bulstrode in May 1882, at the age of 87 years. Jean-Baptiste Decaraffe, alias Jean-Louis Bourbon, had 12 children, he was buried in Bécancour on March 16, 1813, aged 51 years. He was therefore born around 1762. The people of Bécancour, we do not know why, had nicknamed this family, newly arrived in the parish, the Christophe. Marie-Louise Du Tremble-Cottenoire (wife of Jean-Baptiste Decaraffe) married, in second marriage, Joseph Leblanc, of Saint-Grégoire. She was buried in Saint-Célestin in 1866, aged 98. Buried first in the parish cemetery, the parish priest of Saint-Célestin, Mgr Marquis, later had his body transported to his family vault, saying: "It is the body of the wife of the son of a king of France" . According to Father Chs-Ed. Mailhot.

The toponym "Bourbon River" was made official on December 5, 1968, at the Commission de toponymie du Québec.

== See also ==
- List of rivers of Quebec
