= Plessisville, Quebec (parish) =

Plessisville
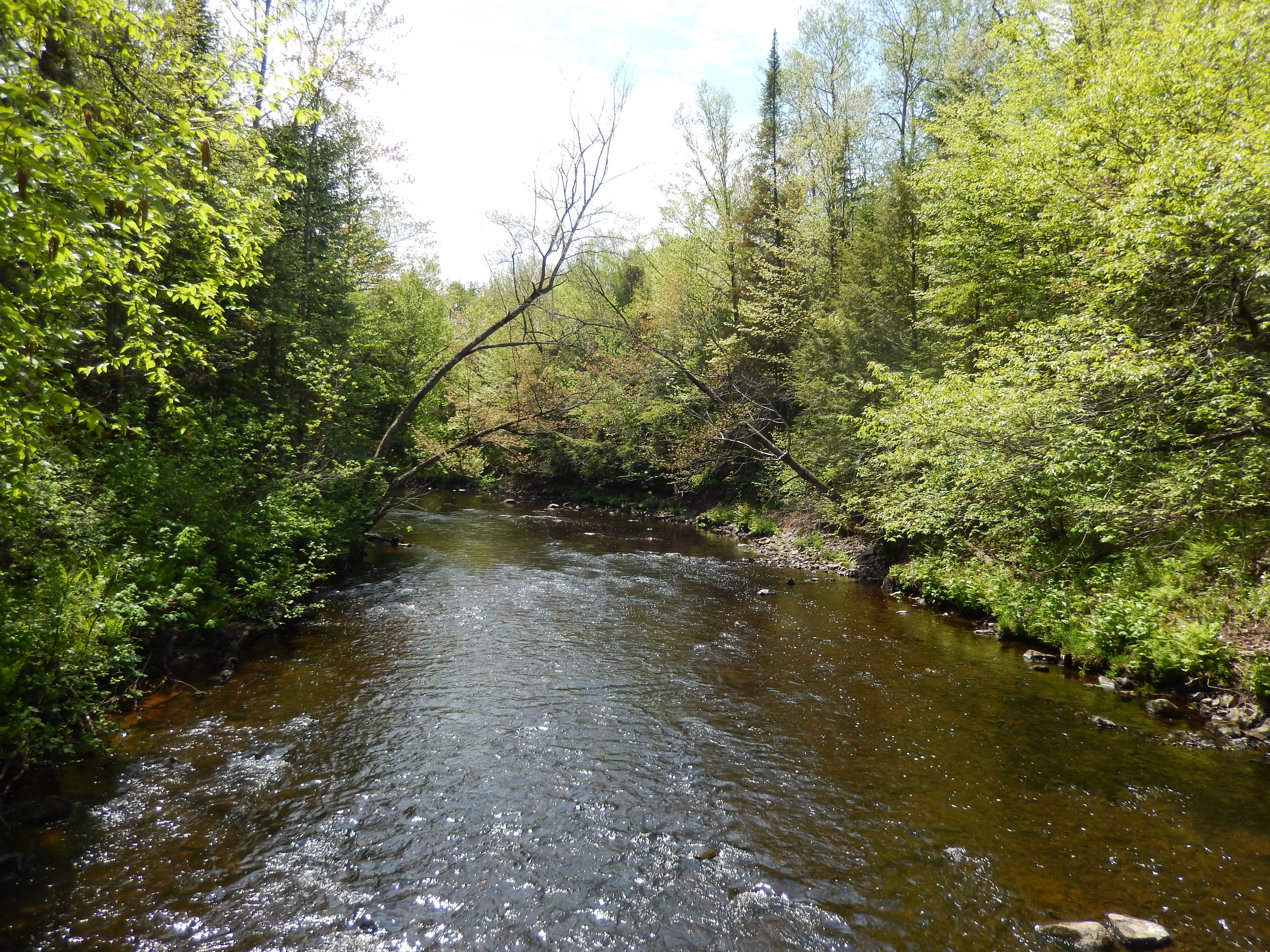
- Noire River.

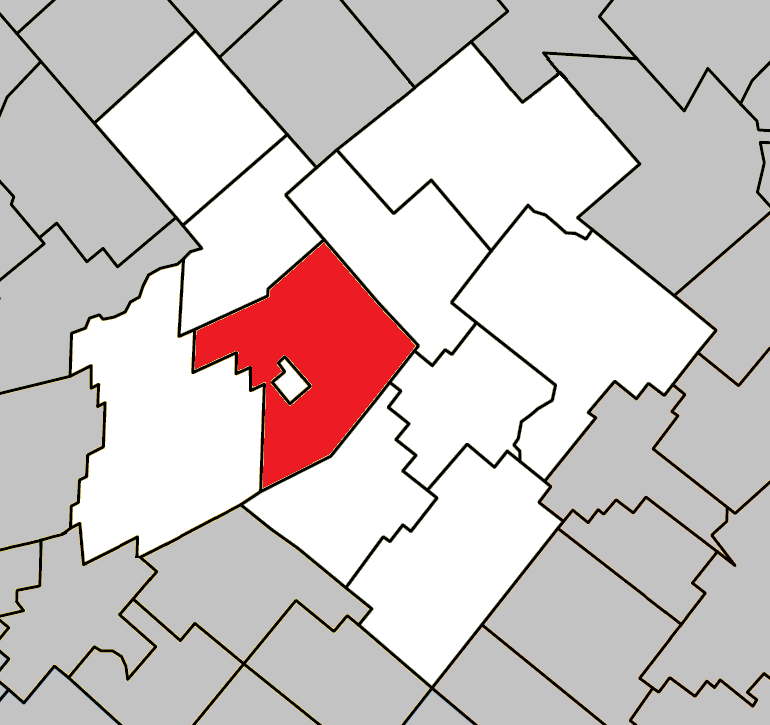
- Location within L'Érable RCM.

- Location in southern Quebec.
- Coordinates: 46°14′N 71°45′W
- Country: Canada
- Province: Quebec
- Region: Centre-du-Québec
- RCM: L'Érable
- Constituted: July 1, 1855
- Named for: Joseph-Octave Plessis

Government
  - Mayor: Alain Dubois
  - Federal riding: Mégantic—L'Érable
  - Prov. riding: Arthabaska

Area
  - Total: 141.30 km^{2} (54.56 sq mi)
  - Land: 142.75 km^{2} (55.12 sq mi)
- There is an apparent contradiction between two authoritative sources

Population (2011)
  - Total: 2,678
  - Density: 18.8/km^{2} (49/sq mi)
  - Pop 2006-2011: ▲4.7%
  - Dwellings: 1,059
- Time zone: UTC−5 (EST)
  - Summer (DST): UTC−4 (EDT)
- Postal code(s): G6L 2Y7
- Area code: 819
- Highways: R-116; R-165; R-265; R-267
- Website: www.paroisse plessisville.com

Plessisville (French pronunciation: [plɛsivil]) was a parish municipality in the Centre-du-Québec region of Quebec. It completely surrounded the city of the same name. On 1 January 2024, the parish municipality merged with the city of Plessisville.

== Demographics ==
In the 2021 Census of Population conducted by Statistics Canada, Plessisville had a population of 2,655 living in 1,062 of its 1,091 total private dwellings, a change of −0.3% from its 2016 population of 2,663. With a land area of 141.19 km^{2} (54.51 sq mi), it had a population density of 18.8/km^{2} (48.7/sq mi) in 2021.
