= Goulet River (Bécancour River tributary) =

River in Centre-du-Québec, Quebec (Canada)

- Native name: Rivière Goulet (French)

Location
- Country: Canada
- Province: Quebec
- Region: Centre-du-Québec
- MRC: Arthabaska Regional County Municipality

Physical characteristics
- Source: Agricultural and forest streams
  - location: Saint-Rosaire
  - coordinates: 46.210781°N 71.990593°W
  - elevation: 117 m (384 ft)
- Mouth: Bécancour River
  - location: Bécancour
  - coordinates: 46.22694°N 72.06805°W
  - elevation: 81 m (266 ft)
- Length: 10.1 km (6.3 mi)

Basin features
- River system: Bécancour River, St. Lawrence River
- Tributaries
  - left: (upstream) Bras de la rivière Goulet
  - right: (upstream)

The Goulet river (in French: rivière Goulet) is a tributary of the Bécancour River. This watercourse flows in the municipalities of Saint-Rosaire and Saint-Louis-de-Blandford, in the Arthabaska Regional County Municipality (MRC), in the administrative region of Centre-du-Québec, in Quebec, in Canada.

== Geography ==
The main neighboring hydrographic slopes of the Goulet river are:

- north side: Bécancour River, Lacasse stream;
- east side: Desharnais stream;
- south side: Blanche River;
- west side: Bécancour River.

The Goulet River has its source in the 2e rang of Saint-Louis-de-Blandford.

The Goulet river flows on 10.1 kilometres (6.3 mi) according to the following segmentsː

- 4.0 kilometres (2.5 mi) west and north, in Saint-Rosaire, to the limit of Saint-Louis-de-Blandford;
- 2.0 kilometres (1.2 mi) westward, to route 165;
- 3.5 kilometres (2.2 mi) west to highway 20;
- 0.6 kilometres (0.37 mi) west to its mouth.

The Goulet River empties on the southeast bank of the Bécancour River east of the village of Daveluyville.

== Toponymy ==
The toponym "rivière Goulet" was made official on December 5, 1968, at the Commission de toponymie du Québec.

== See also ==
- List of rivers of Quebec
