= McKenzie River (Bécancour River tributary) =

River in Centre-du-Québec, Quebec (Canada)

- Native name: Rivière McKenzie (French)

Location
- Country: Canada
- Province: Quebec
- Region: Centre-du-Québec
- MRC: L'Érable Regional County Municipality

Physical characteristics
- Source: Forest and mountain streams
  - location: Thetford Mines (sector Pontbriand)
  - coordinates: 46.238524°N 71.659218°W
  - elevation: 282 m (925 ft)
- Mouth: Bécancour River
  - location: Saint-Jacques-de-Leeds
  - coordinates: 46.23167°N 71.50444°W
  - elevation: 190 m (620 ft)
- Length: 11.9 km (7.4 mi)

Basin features
- Progression: Bécancour River, St. Lawrence River
- Tributaries
  - left: (upstream)
  - right: (upstream)

The McKenzie River (in French: rivière McKenzie) is a tributary of the Bécancour River which is a tributary of the south shore of the St. Lawrence River. The McKenzie River flows through the municipalities of Laurierville, Saint-Pierre-Baptiste and Inverness, in the L'Érable Regional County Municipality (MRC), in the administrative region of Centre-du-Québec, in Quebec, in Canada.

== Geography ==
The main neighboring watersheds of the McKenzie River are:

- north side: Noire River;
- east side: Bécancour River;
- south side: Bécancour River, Golden stream;
- west side: Bécancour River, Noire River.

The McKenzie River originates from agricultural streams in the municipality of Laurierville, 3.4 kilometres (2.1 mi) northeast of the summit of Mount Apic (elevation: 320 metres (1,050 ft)), at 2.5 kilometres (1.6 mi) south of route 267.

From its source, the McKenzie River flows on 11.9 kilometres (7.4 mi) divided into the following segments:

- 2.3 kilometres (1.4 mi) eastward, in Laurierville, to the municipal limit of Saint-Pierre-Baptiste;
- 1.8 kilometres (1.1 mi) eastward, in the municipality of Saint-Pierre-Baptiste;
- 3.6 kilometres (2.2 mi) towards the south-east, jetting the boundary between the municipalities of Inverness and Saint-Pierre-Baptiste;
- 4.2 kilometres (2.6 mi) eastward, passing south of Inverness, to its mouth.

The McKenzie River empties onto the west bank of the Bécancour River southeast of the village of Inverness.

== Toponymy ==
The toponym "McKenzie River" was made official on August 17, 1978, at the Commission de toponymie du Québec.

== See also ==
- List of rivers of Quebec
