= Bécancour River =

Canadian river in Quebec

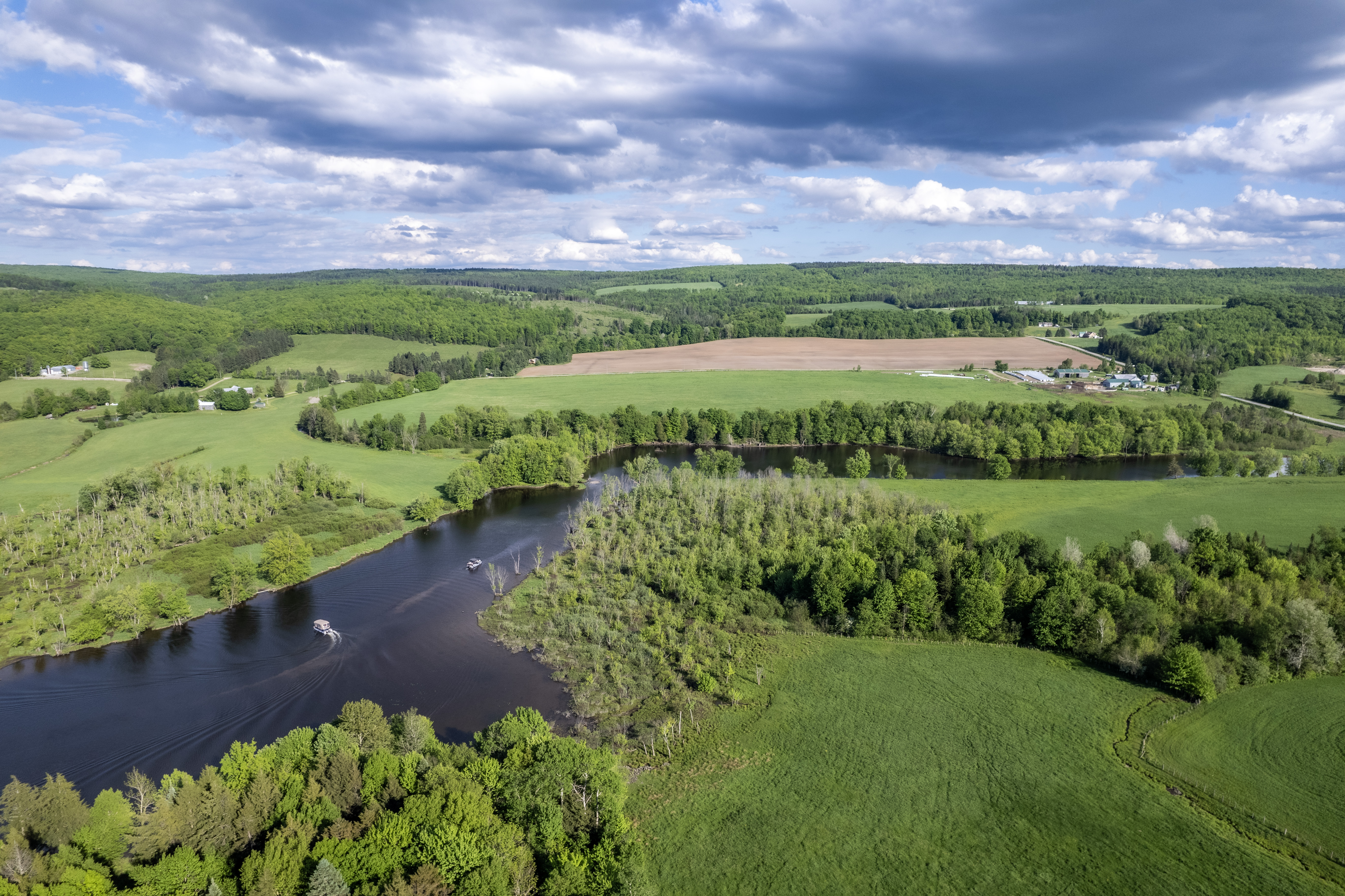

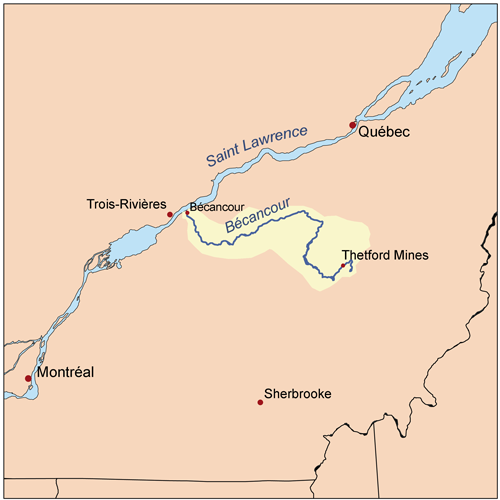
- Native name: Rivière Bécancour (French)

Location
- Country: Canada
- Province: Quebec
- Region: Chaudière-Appalaches, Centre-du-Québec

Physical characteristics
- Source: Bécancour Lake
  - location: Thetford Mines, Chaudière-Appalaches, Quebec, Canada
  - coordinates: 46°04′10″N 71°14′39″W
  - elevation: 402 metres (1,319 ft)
- Mouth: St. Lawrence River
  - location: Bécancour, Centre-du-Québec, Quebec, Canada
  - coordinates: 46°22′20″N 72°26′47″W
  - elevation: 6 metres (20 ft)
- Length: 210 km (130 mi)
- Basin size: 2,607 km^{2} (1,007 sq mi)
- Discharge
  - location: Saint Lawrence River

Basin features
- Tributaries
  - left: (upstream) Judith River, chenal d'en Haut, Blanche River; ruisseaux: Gédéon-Forest, Houle, Désilet, Mathieu, Béliveau, Mayrand; rivière du Portage; ruisseaux: Plourde, Xavier-Blais, Macartouche; Blanche River, Goulet River; ruisseaux: Poirier, Vézina, Lacasse; Bourbon River, Noire River; ruisseau du Premier Rang de Stanford, cours d'eau Tremblay, ruisseau Gingras, ruisseau Labrecque, ruisseau Gosselin-Dubuc, ruisseau Lavallière, cours d'eau Gingras, ruisseau McNay, ruisseau Noël-Côté, McKenzie River, ruisseau Golden, ruisseau Hamilton, ruisseau Langlois, ruisseau Pinette (via William Lake), Fortier River (via William Lake), ruisseau Garner, Larochelle River, ruisseau Venlo, rivière au Pin, décharge d'un lac de marais, décharge de quelques lacs, ruisseau ?, ruisseau ?.
  - right: (upstream) Ruisseaux: d'en Haut, Le Ruisseau, Zéphirin-Richard, du Chicot Noir, Désilets, Deshaies, Joseph-Larivière, Saint-Sylvestre, Gaudet, Cormier, Brûlé, Provencher, Noël, rivière du Moulin, Le Petit Ruisseau, ruisseau Bédard, Le Gros Ruisseau, Napoléon-Côté, Philippe-Blier, Tardif, Quatrième Rang, Gosselin-Moisan, Perdrix River, ruisseau Brochu, Morin, Palmer River, Gosselin, cours d'eau Bilodeau, ruisseau du Petit-Kinnears, ruisseau ?, Dubois River (via William Lake, ruisseau McLean, Bagot River, cours d'eau Faucher, ruisseau Salaberry, Nadeau, Marcoux, Madore, Gingras, Lessard, Labonté, cours d'eau Turcotte-Prévost, cours d'eau Raby.

The Bécancour River (French pronunciation: [bekɑ̃kuʁ]) is a river flowing in the administrative region of Centre-du-Québec, in Quebec, Canada.

== Geography ==
The Bécancour takes its source from the lake of the same name in the town of Thetford Mines, in the Chaudière-Appalaches region. It flows west into William Lake at Saint-Ferdinand, changes course northwards towards Inverness, turning westward there and continuing to flow west across the Centre-du-Québec region for most of its length. The river takes a turn northwestward at Saint-Wenceslas, finally emptying into the Saint Lawrence River near the heart of the city of Bécancour.

=== Course ===
The course of the Bécancour, which is 196 kilometres (122 mi), begins at 402 metres (1,319 ft) of altitude in the Appalachian Mountains. It has its source in Bécancour Lake, in the town of Thetford Mines. It follows a winding route to Lyster, which marks its entry into the St. Lawrence Lowlands. It then turns west-southwest to Daveluyville where it turns north-west to Bécancour where it flows into the estuary of Saint Lawrence.

== Major tributaries ==
- Rivière au Pin
- Palmer River
- Noire River
- Bourbon River
- Blanche River (Saint-Rosaire)
- Blanche River (Thetford Mines)

=== Hydrology ===
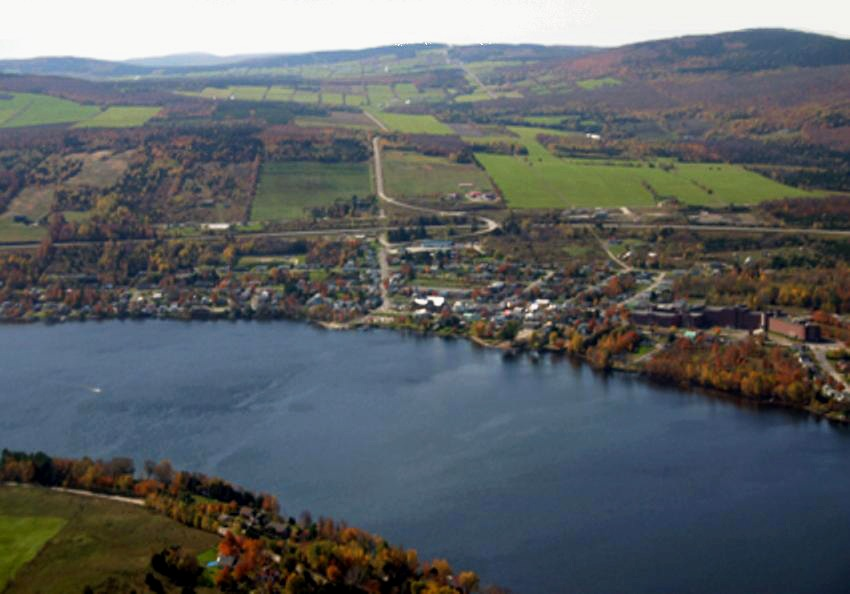
Aerial view of William Lake and Saint-Ferdinand

The watershed has an area of 2,620 kilometres (1,627.99 mi). Its modulus, which is measured at Maddington and comprises 84% of the basin, is 59 m3/s. Its average flood is 200 m3/s and its low water discharge is 25 m3/s. As for the extreme values recorded, they range from 1 to 500 m3/s. The city of Thetford Mines diverts part of the waters of the Saint-François basin for the benefit of Bécancour via its aqueduct, that is 19,000 cubic metres per day (7,800 cu ft/ks). This input, however, has a negligible effect on the river flow and represents less than 0.05 m3/s at Maddington.

The river receives input from 87 watercourses. Its main tributaries are, from upstream to downstream, the rivière au Pin, the Bullard stream, the Palmer River (Bécancour River tributary), the Noire River, the Bourbon River the Blanche River at Saint-Rosaire and another Blanche river at Saint-Wenceslas.

The basin includes 62 lakes over one hectare (2.5 acres). In addition to Bécancour Lake (83 hectares [210 acres]), the river crosses Stater pond (8 hectares [20 acres]) and lakes à la Truite (135 hectares [330 acres]), William Lake (492 hectares [1,220 acres], the largest in the basin) and Joseph (243 hectares [600 acres]). As for wetlands, they cover 154 kilometres (95.69 mi), or 5.9% of the basin. Of these, the bogs covers 118 kilometres (73.32 mi) and the swamps 26 kilometres (16.16 mi).

=== Population ===
In 2008, the basin's population was estimated at 64354 inhabitants and had a density of 25 inhabitants per square kilometre (65/sq mi). The territory of the basin is divided into 45 municipalities and one Indian reserve. The largest municipality in the basin, Thetford Mines (26,190 inhabitants), has 41% of the population of this basin. Two other towns over 5000 inhabitants are Princeville and Plessisville.

=== Geology ===
Bécancour is part of two geological provinces, namely the Appalachians upstream and the St. Lawrence Lowlands downstream. The Appalachians are composed of sedimentary rocks and volcanic which have been deposited in a deep marine environment. They were raised during the Taconic orogeny. As for the St. Lawrence platform, it is composed of limestone, sandstone and mudrock undeformed;.

=== Natural environment ===
The basin includes 378 plant species. In the plain downstream of the basin, the main forest species are gray birch, trembling aspen, white spruce and balsam fir. Peatlands encourage black spruce and tamarack. The Appalachian sector is dominated by maple grove to yellow birch and maple grove to beech. The top of the mountains near Thetford Mines are favorable to white birch while at the bottom of the slopes we find balsam fir and tamarack.

We find 66 species of fish in the Bécancour basin. The main species of interest for sport fishing are brook trout, brown trout, rainbow trout, Atlantic salmon, lake trout, northern pike, muskellunge, brown bullhead, rock bass, pumpkinseed, smallmouth bass, largemouth bass, perch and walleye.

== Toponymy ==
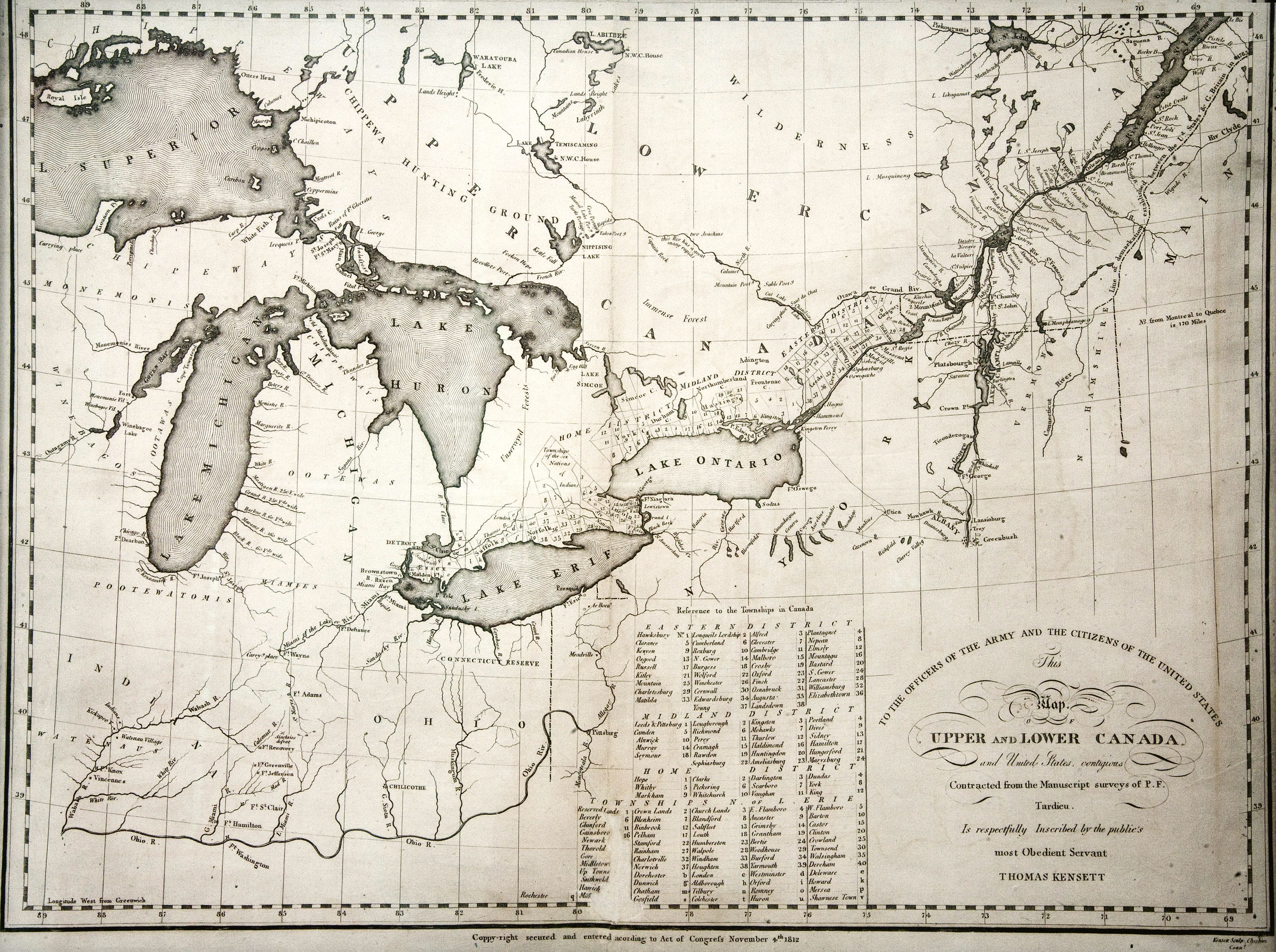
A map of Canada from 1812, showing the town of Bequencourt at the mouth of the Grand Puant River.

In the 17th century, the river was originally known by European sattlers as the "Stinking River". Around 1600, some Abenaki families established themselves on the Puante River. The use continued during the first half of the 18th century. A map of the province of Quebec from 1776 shows a "Gt. Puante River" and a "L. Puante River" north of it. A map of Canada from 1812 shows the Grand Puant River with the town of Bequencourt at its mouth and a smaller Puant River farther north.

The Abenaki name it Wôlinaktekw which means "river at the bay". The Scottish who settled in Inverness named the section that passes through their territory "Thames River" (the Thames).

The present-day name of the river commemorates Pierre Robineau de Bécancour, 2e baron de Portneuf, lord of Bécancour (1654–1729). This name appeared on the 1695 map of Jean Deshayes. This name replaced the original names of Puante rivers (where the battle of the Puante River took place), and Saint-Michel.

The toponym Rivière Bécancour was formalized on December 5, 1968, at the Commission de toponymie du Québec.

== History ==
It was around 1600 that the Abenakis settled at the mouth of the Wôlinaktekw. Most of the natives who settled there came from Namesokântsik (a place where there are many fish), now known as Mégantic, and from the Abenakis from the region of the river Kennebec which circulated by Lake Mégantic. After several trips, they settled permanently in Wôlinak in 1735. The “Piste Bécancour” (Abenaki Becancour Trail), linked the Grand lac Saint François, via the Petit lac Saint-François (Ashberham), in the canton of Coleraine, to the basin of the Bécancour River to Wôlinak. A village named "Wananoak" located near the sources of the river and a path leading to Lac Mégantic is inscribed on a Mitchell Map of 1755. The village is also described : Indian village of New France or Canada located near the shore and the source of the Puante river. As for the French, they began to settle in the plain of Bécancour in 1676. The Appalachian region was colonized by the British in the early 1800s. They were replaced by the French Canadians and the Irish around the middle of the 19th century.

However, the Appalachian region was transformed as early as 1876 with the discovery of asbestos. It was in 1905 that Thetford Mines, the most important city in the basin, was founded.

== Image gallery ==
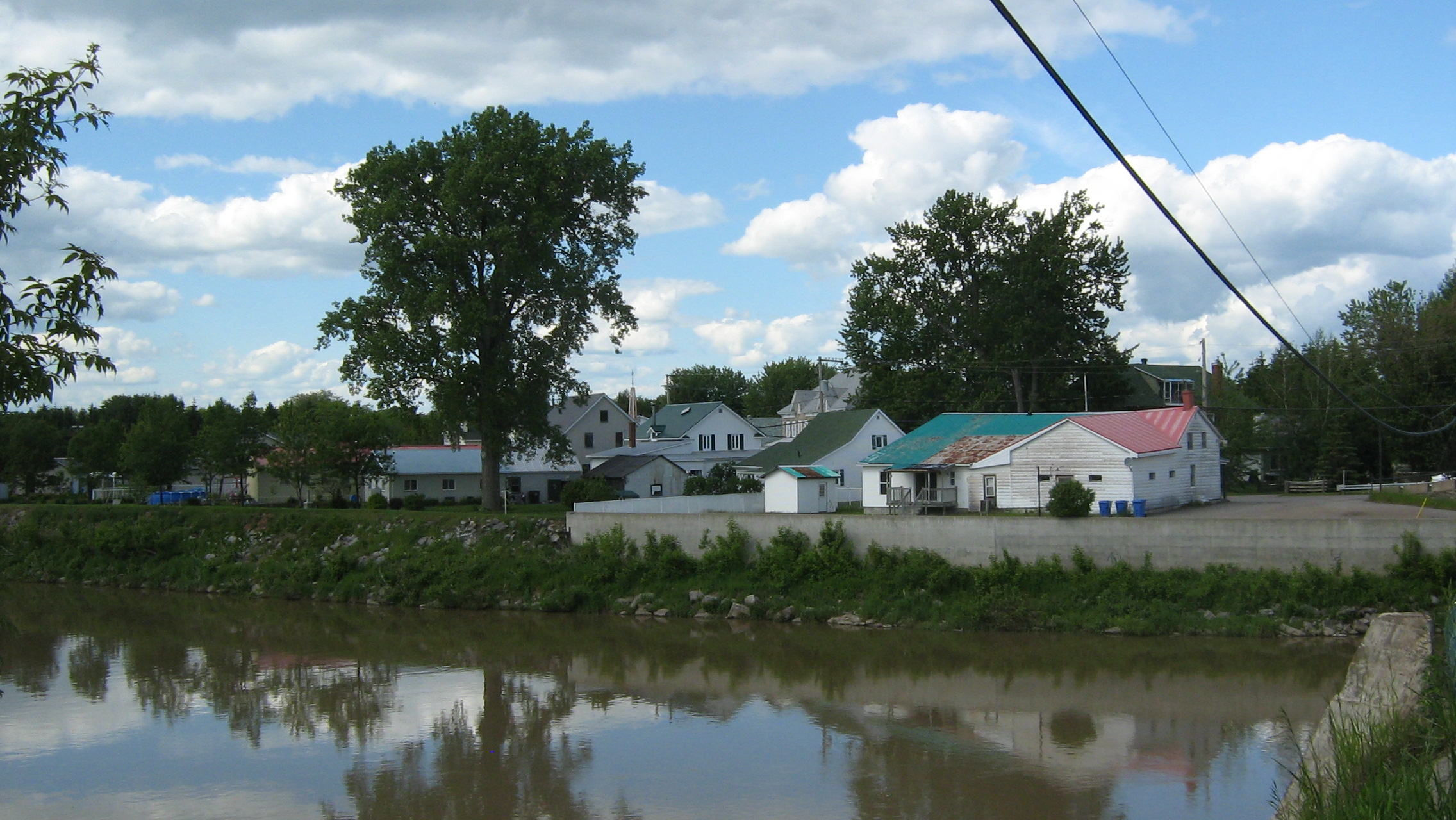
Village of Bécancour

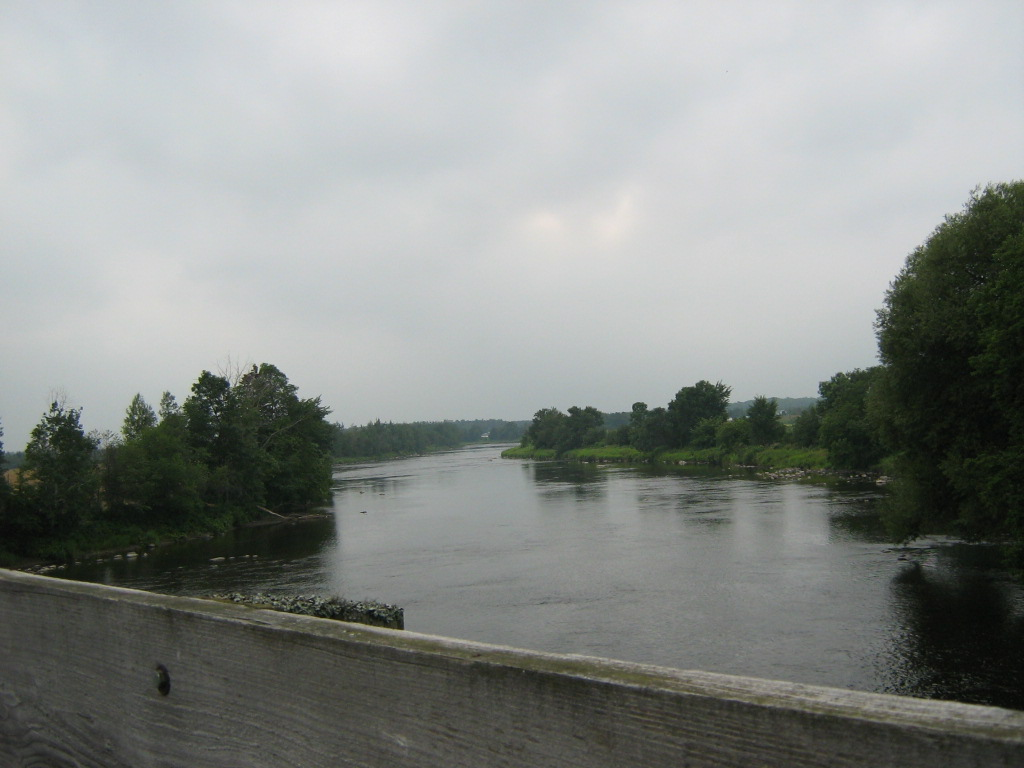
Rivière Bécancour at Lyster

== See also ==
- Bécancour Regional County Municipality (MRC)
- List of rivers of Quebec
