= Marie-Rose Turcot =

Canadian writer (1887–1977)

Marie-Rose Turcot (July 2, 1887 – November 27, 1977) was a Canadian writer.

Turcot was born in Laurierville, Quebec, to Belzémire Rousseau and Georges Turcot, a member of the Canadian House of Commons. She was educated at a convent in Plessisville and at the University of Ottawa, where she studied literature and philosophy. At the age of 20, she moved to Ottawa to join the federal public service. She worked as a journalist for Le Droit from 1934 to 1950; her work also appeared in various daily and weekly publications in Ottawa and Montreal. She sometimes used the pseudonym Constance Bayard. She was also a journalist for the Hull radio station CKCH.

Besides her own writing, she also collected and published Franco-Ontarian folklore.

Turcot was a member of various French-Canadian cultural organizations in Ottawa, including Le Caveau.

Turcot died in Orleans at the age of 90.

A plaque describing her life was placed in front of the Rideau branch of the Ottawa Public Library by the Ontario Heritage Trust.

== Selected works ==
- L'Homme du jour, stories (1920)
- Le Carrousel, stories (1928)
- Nicolette Auclair, novel (1930)
- Un Jasper, novel (1933)
- Au pays des géants et des fées, folklore (1937)
- Le Maître, poetry and prose (1940)
