= Bécancour Lake =

Lake in Quebec, Canada

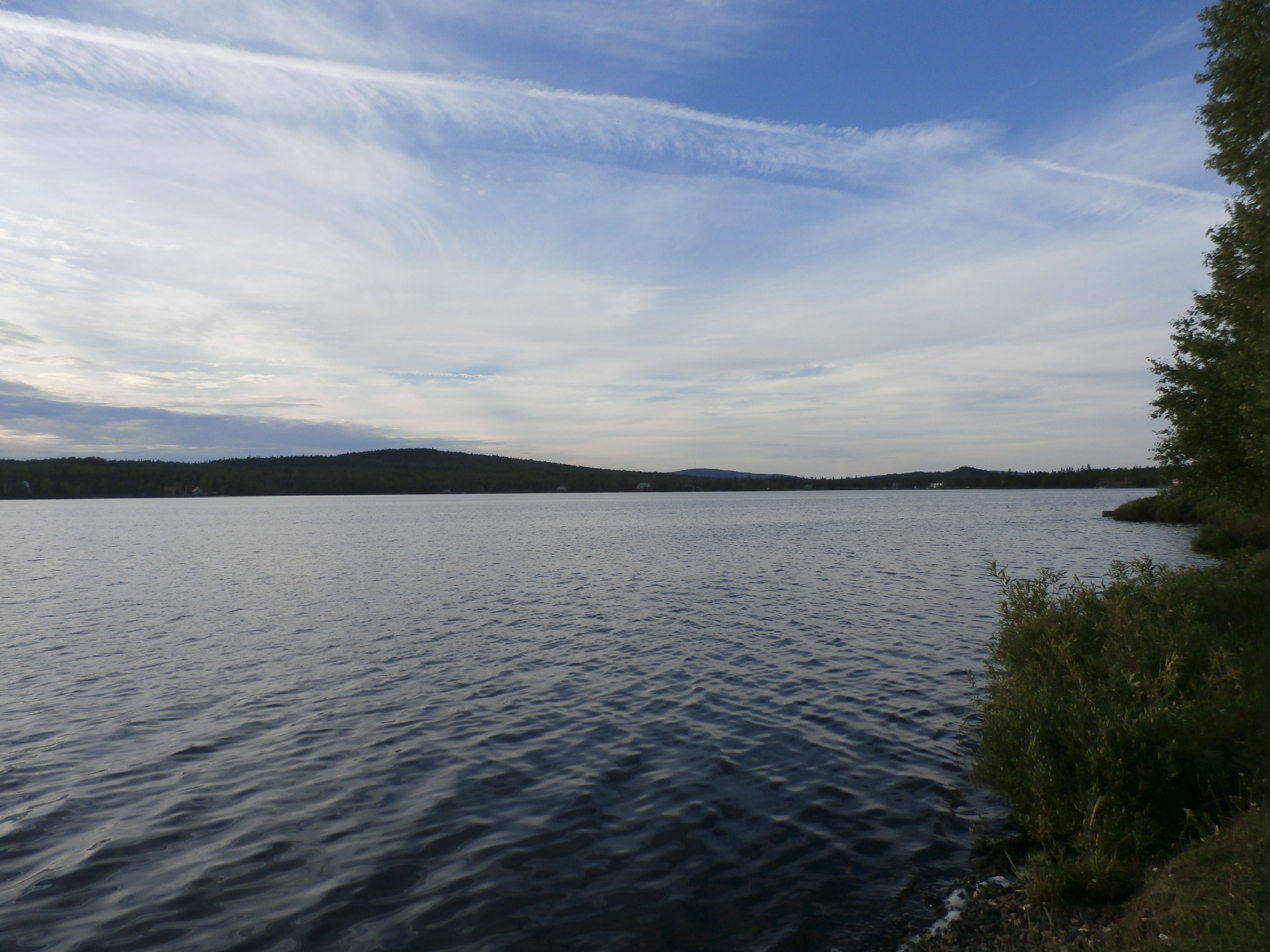
- Lake Bécancour seen from the south shore to the north

- Location within Quebec
- Coordinates: 46.07133°N 71.24184°W
- Primary outflows: Bécancour River
- Basin countries: Canada
- Surface area: 0.973 kilometres (0.60 mi)
- Average depth: 3.4 metres (11 ft)
- Surface elevation: 402 metres (1,319 ft)

The Lake Bécancour is a lake located in the municipality of Thetford Mines in the administrative region of Chaudière-Appalaches, in Quebec, in Canada. It is the source of the Bécancour River, which flows through the Centre-du-Québec administrative region and joins the St. Lawrence River.

== Geography ==
Its area is approximately 0.973 kilometres (0.60 mi), its altitude of 335 metres (1,099 ft) and its maximum depth is 3.4 meters (11 ft).

== Toponymy ==
The toponym "lac Bécancour" was made official on December 5, 1968, at the Commission de toponymie du Québec.
