= Denis Blondin =

Canadian anthropologist and writer

Denis Blondin (born 1947 in Plessisville, Quebec) is a Canadian (Quebec) anthropologist and writer. Blondin received a Master of Arts from Université Laval in 1975, during which he worked on ethnographic research on the lower north shore of the St. Lawrence River, in Quebec, Canada. He was a professor of anthropology at the Collège François-Xavier-Garneau from 1975 until 2006. Blondin has worked on issues of racism and the fisheries of Costa Rica. As part of his research he examined the transmission of racism through educational texts in Quebec elementary and secondary education.

== Bibliography ==
- La mort de l'argent : essai d'anthropologie naïve (2003) ISBN 2890241556
- Les deux espèces humaines : autopsie du racisme ordinaire (1995) ISBN 2738434002
- Pescadores artesanales en un medio urbano : Chacarita (1992)
- L'apprentissage du racisme dans les manuels scolaires (1990) ISBN 2890222039
- Les fondements cognitifs du racisme transmis dans les manuels scolaires du Québec, (1989)
- Les gens de la terre et les gens de la mer : histoire économique de la Basse-Côte-Nord (1982)
- Groupes domestiques, adoption et parrainage sur la Moyenne-Côte-Nord du Saint-Laurent (1975, MS thesis)
- La structure occupationnelle de la Moyenne-Côte-Nord (1973)
- Kégaska : étude communautaire (1970)
