= Sainte-Sophie-d'Halifax =

- Municipality
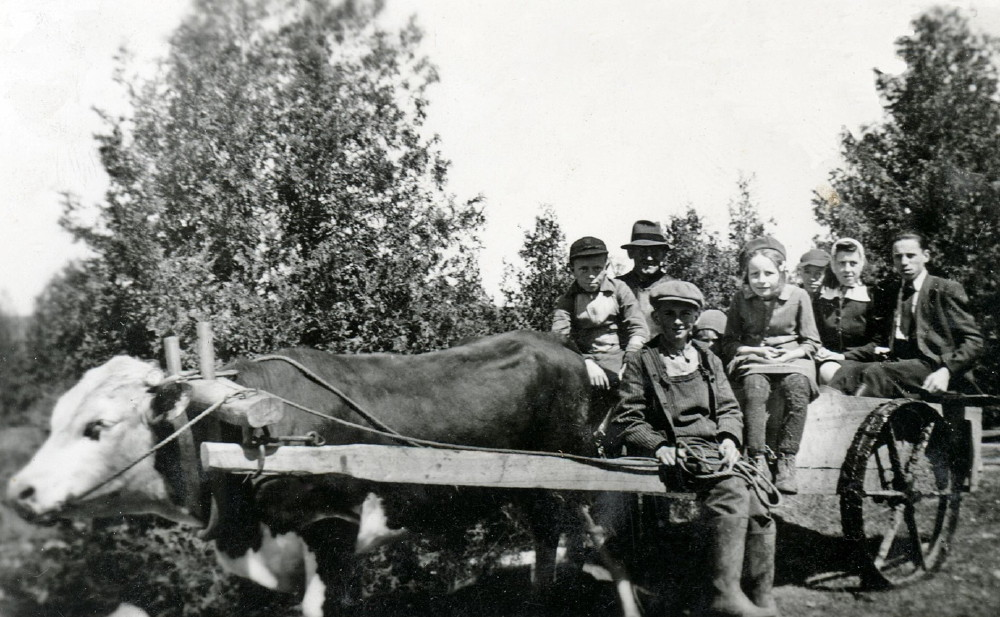

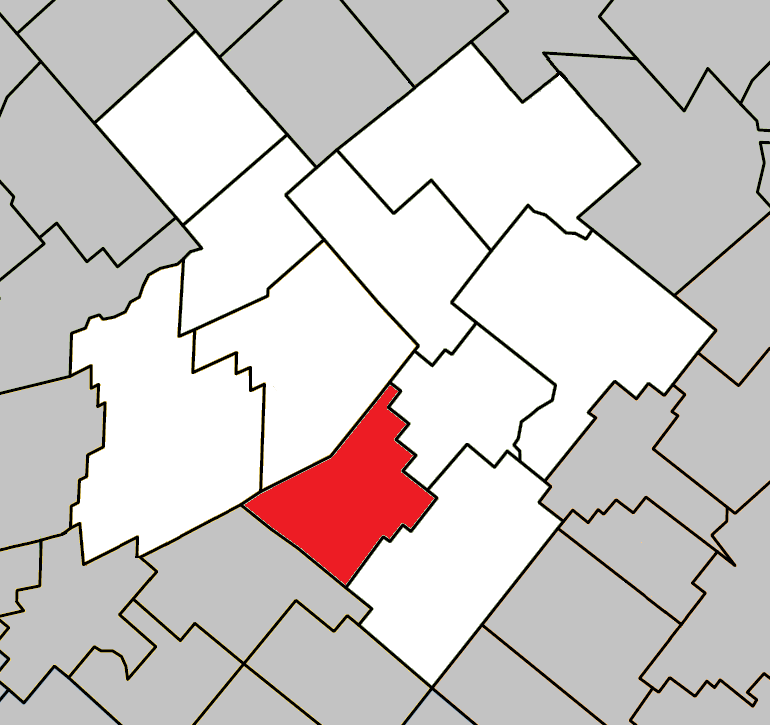
- Location within L'Érable RCM.

- Location in southern Quebec.
- Coordinates: 46°09′N 71°43′W
- Country: Canada
- Province: Quebec
- Region: Centre-du-Québec
- RCM: L'Érable
- Constituted: December 17, 1997

Government
  - Mayor: Christian Daigle
  - Federal riding: Mégantic—L'Érable—Lotbinière
  - Prov. riding: Arthabaska–L'Érable

Area
  - Total: 92.30 km^{2} (35.64 sq mi)
  - Land: 92.13 km^{2} (35.57 sq mi)

Population (2021)
  - Total: 595
  - Density: 6.5/km^{2} (17/sq mi)
  - Pop 2016-2021: ▼2.8%
  - Dwellings: 258
- Time zone: UTC−5 (EST)
  - Summer (DST): UTC−4 (EDT)
- Postal code(s): G0P 1L0
- Area code: 819
- Highways: R-165
- Website: www.saintesophie dhalifax.com

Sainte-Sophie-d'Halifax is a municipality in the Centre-du-Québec region of the province of Quebec in Canada.

According to the Commission de toponymie du Québec, the municipality got its name from the work of a Parish priest named Abbot Charles Trudell, in honor of Saint Sophia. Originally, Sainte-Sophie was its own entity, which split from Halifax du Nord in 1937. Halifax du Nord & Sainte-Sophie reunited in 1997, thus reforming Sainte-Sophie-d'Halifax.

== History ==
Sainte-Sophie-d'Halifax was created by the 1997 merger of Sainte-Sophie and Halifax-Nord.

== Geography ==
Sainte-Sophie-d'Halifax is about 10km southeast of Plessisville, Quebec . It is accessible via Quebec Route 165.
