= Saint-Rosaire =

- Parish municipality
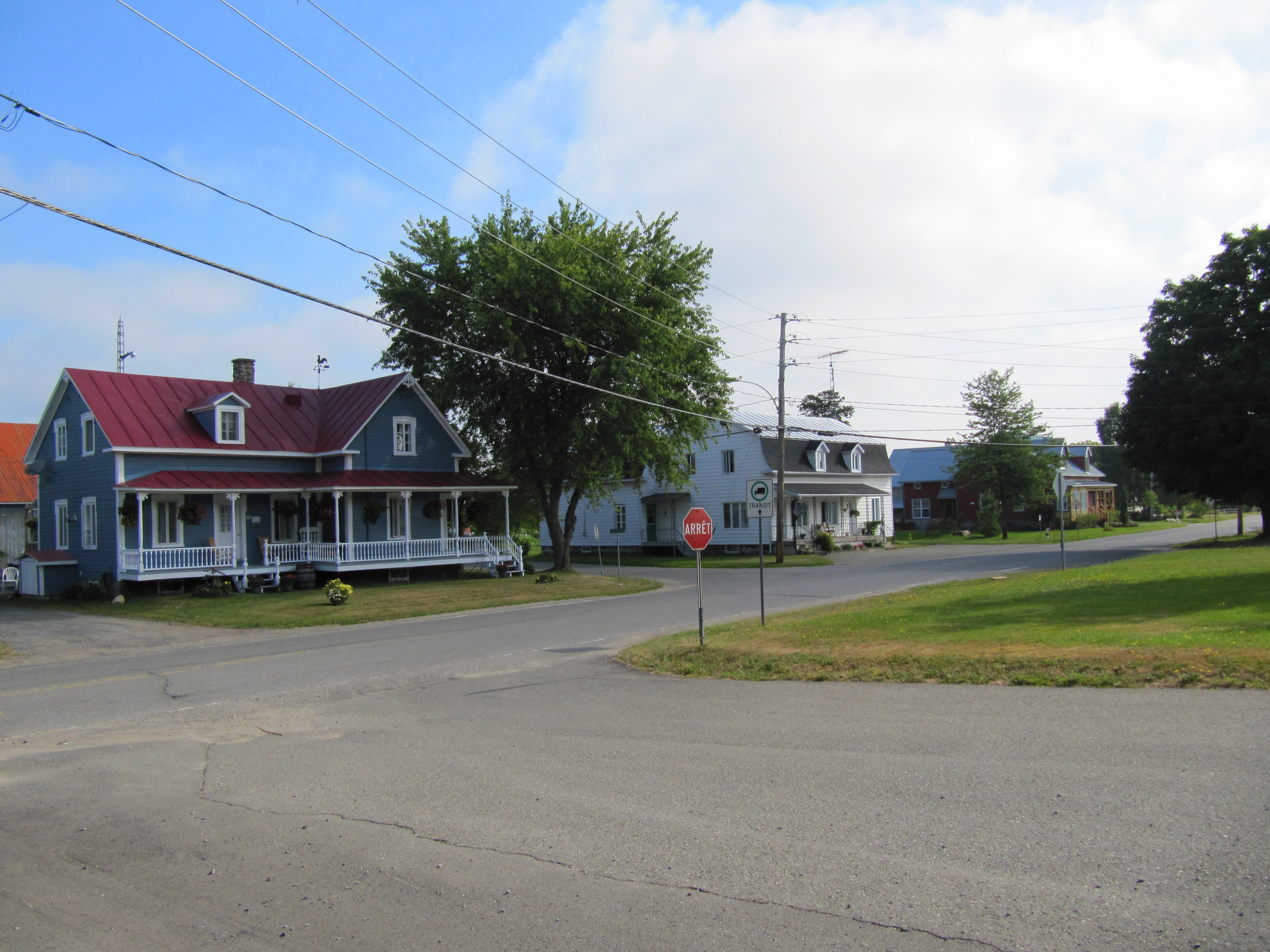
- Main street

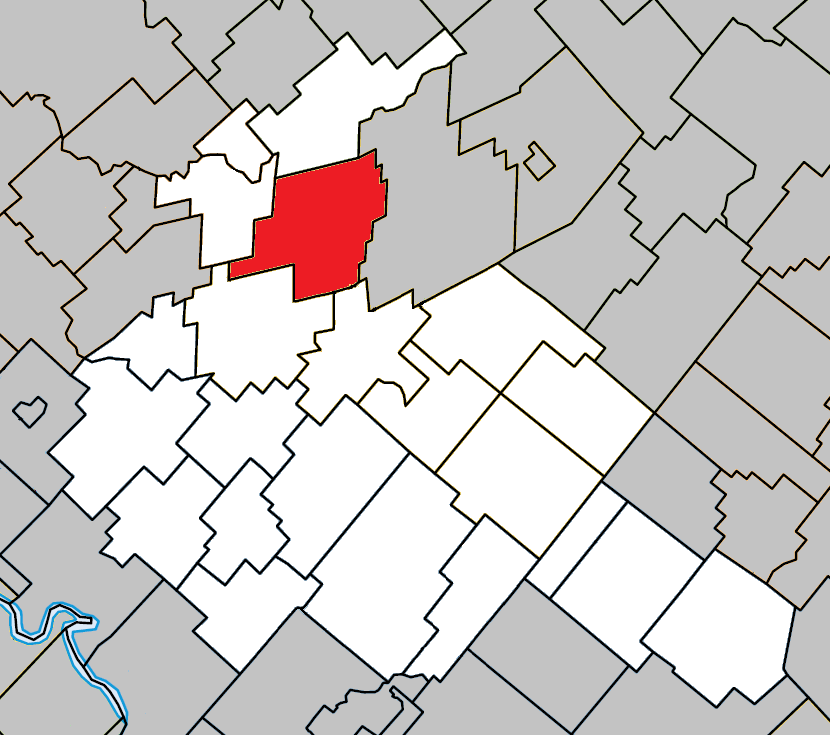
- Location within Arthabaska RCM

- Location in southern Quebec.
- Coordinates: 46°10′N 72°02′W
- Country: Canada
- Province: Quebec
- Region: Centre-du-Québec
- RCM: Arthabaska
- Constituted: May 23, 1896

Government
  - Mayor: Harold Poisson
  - Federal riding: Richmond—Arthabaska—des-Sources
  - Prov. riding: Nicolet-Bécancour

Area
  - Total: 109.80 km^{2} (42.39 sq mi)
  - Land: 109.53 km^{2} (42.29 sq mi)

Population (2021)
  - Total: 932
  - Density: 8.5/km^{2} (22/sq mi)
  - Pop 2016-2021: ▲10.6%
- Time zone: UTC−5 (EST)
  - Summer (DST): UTC−4 (EDT)
- Postal code(s): G0Z 1K0
- Area code: 819
- Highways: R-162
- Website: www.municipalite strosaire.qc.ca

Saint-Rosaire (French pronunciation: [sɛ̃ ʁozɛʁ]) is a parish municipality located in the Centre-du-Québec region of Quebec, Canada.

== History ==
Saint-Rosaire was created in 1896 by the merger of territories formally part of Saint-Valère-de-Bulstrode, Sainte-Victoire-d'Arthabaska and Stanfold.

== Demographics ==
In the 2021 Census of Population conducted by Statistics Canada, Saint-Rosaire had a population of 932 living in 363 of its 395 total private dwellings, a change of 10.6% from its 2016 population of 843. With a land area of 109.53 km^{2} (42.29 sq mi), it had a population density of 8.5/km^{2} (22.0/sq mi) in 2021.
