= Saint-Pierre-Baptiste =

- Parish municipality
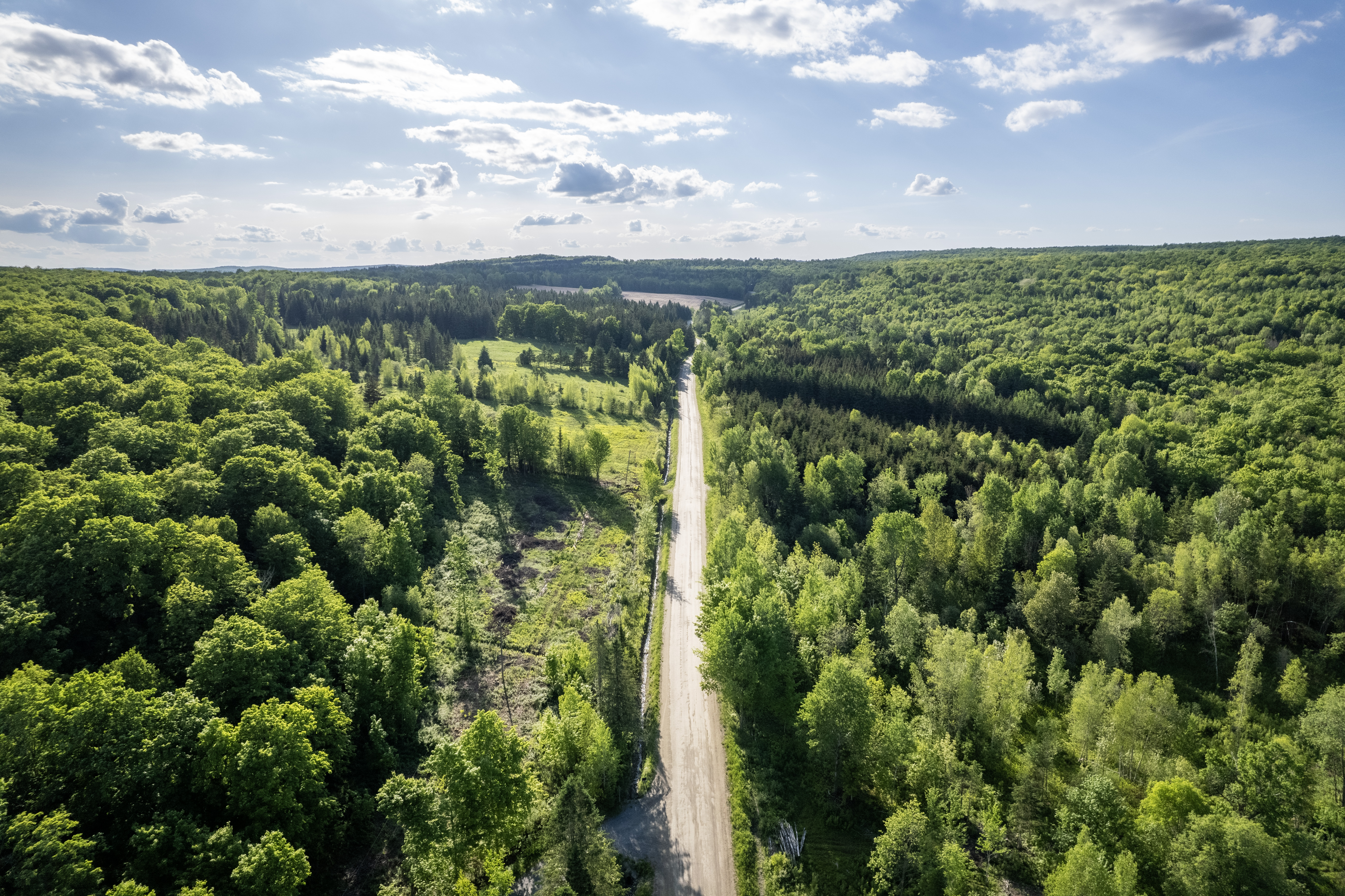
- Aerial view of Saint-Pierre-Baptiste

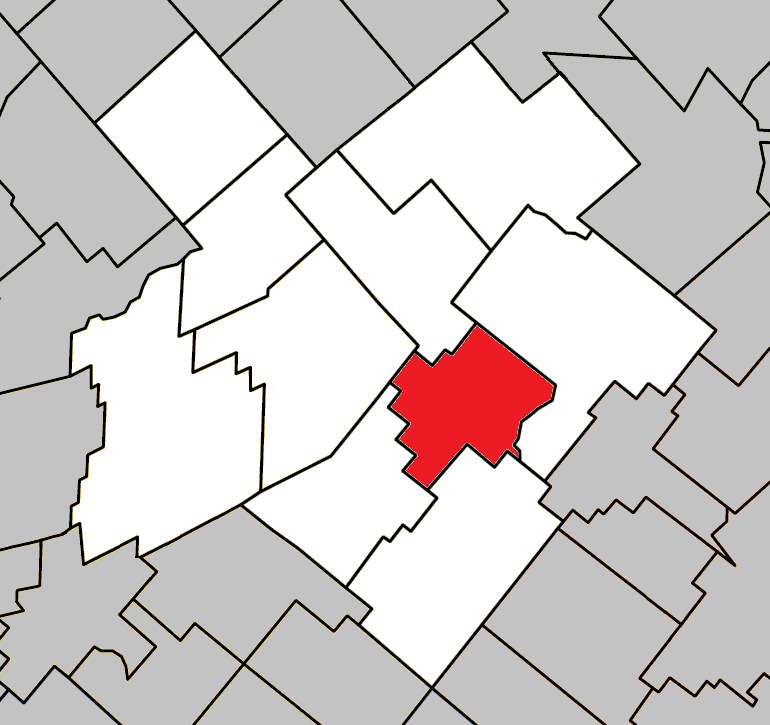
- Location within L'Érable RCM.

- Location in southern Quebec.
- Coordinates: 46°12′N 71°37′W
- Country: Canada
- Province: Quebec
- Region: Centre-du-Québec
- RCM: L'Érable
- Constituted: January 1, 1874

Government
  - Mayor: Donald Lamontagne
  - Federal riding: Mégantic—L'Érable—Lotbinière
  - Prov. riding: Arthabaska–L'Érable

Area
  - Total: 83.50 km^{2} (32.24 sq mi)
  - Land: 81.77 km^{2} (31.57 sq mi)

Population (2021)
  - Total: 560
  - Density: 6.8/km^{2} (18/sq mi)
  - Pop 2016-2021: ▲6.3%
  - Dwellings: 318
- Time zone: UTC−5 (EST)
  - Summer (DST): UTC−4 (EDT)
- Postal code(s): G0P 1K0
- Area codes: 418 and 581
- Highways: R-165
- Website: www.saintpierre baptiste.qc.ca

Saint-Pierre-Baptiste (French pronunciation: [sɛ̃ pjɛʁ batist]) is a parish municipality in Quebec.

== Demographics ==
In the 2021 Census of Population conducted by Statistics Canada, Saint-Pierre-Baptiste had a population of 560 living in 237 of its 318 total private dwellings, a change of 6.3% from its 2016 population of 527. With a land area of 81.77 km^{2} (31.57 sq mi), it had a population density of 6.8/km^{2} (17.7/sq mi) in 2021.
