= Inverness, Quebec =

Inverness
- Municipality
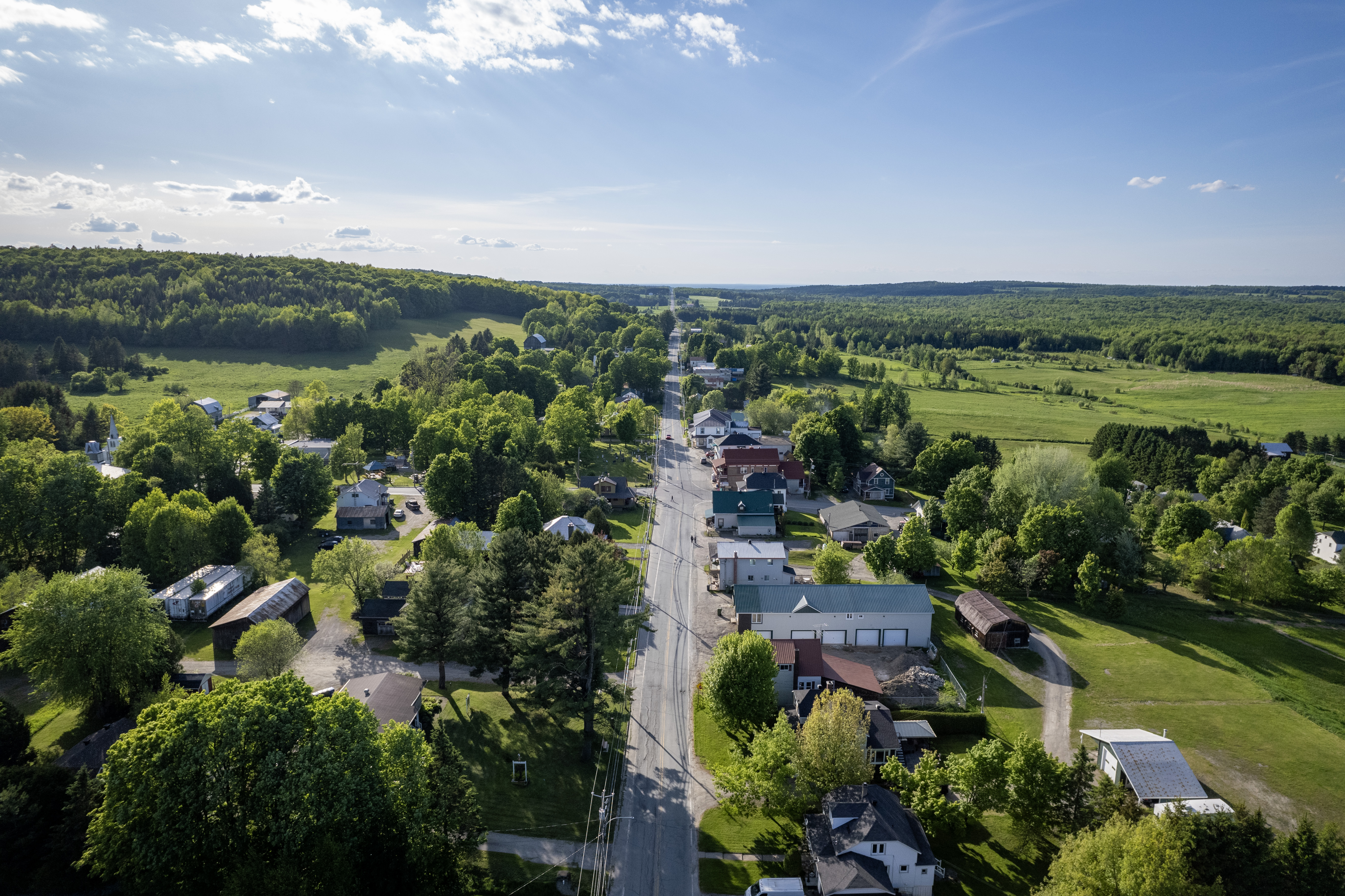
- Aerial view of Inverness

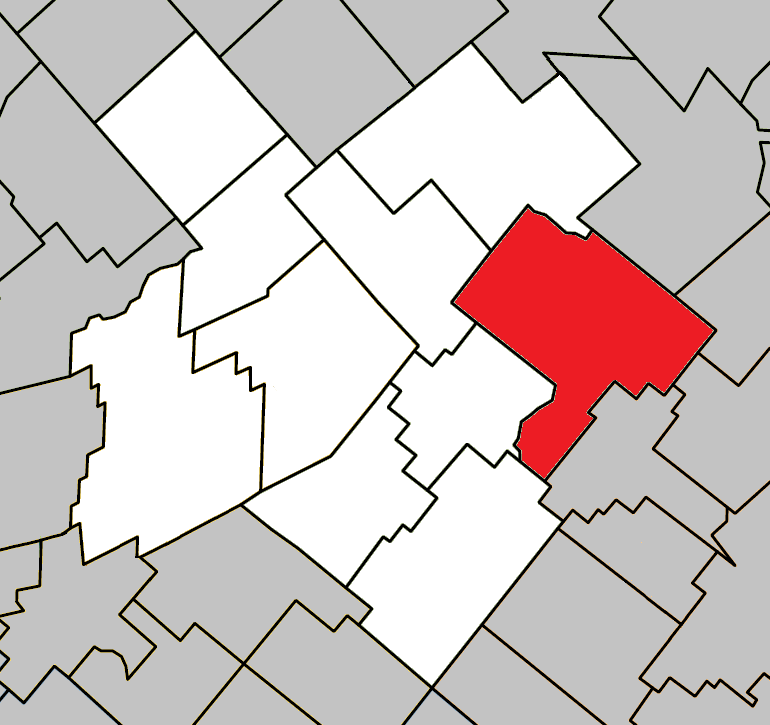
- Location within L'Érable RCM.

- Location in southern Quebec.
- Coordinates: 46°16′N 71°31′W
- Country: Canada
- Province: Quebec
- Region: Centre-du-Québec
- RCM: L'Érable
- Constituted: September 9, 1998

Government
  - Mayor: Gervais Pellerin
  - Federal riding: Mégantic—L'Érable—Lotbinière
  - Prov. riding: Arthabaska–L'Érable

Area
  - Total: 178.20 km^{2} (68.80 sq mi)
  - Land: 176.11 km^{2} (68.00 sq mi)

Population (2021)
  - Total: 910
  - Density: 5.2/km^{2} (13/sq mi)
  - Pop 2016-2021: ▲1.2%
  - Dwellings: 559
- Time zone: UTC−5 (EST)
  - Summer (DST): UTC−4 (EDT)
- Postal code(s): G0S 1K0
- Area codes: 418 and 581
- Highways: R-267
- Website: www.municipalite inverness.ca

Inverness is a municipality in the Centre-du-Québec region of the province of Quebec in Canada.

Irishman William Bennet came to Inverness Township in 1819, but the first colony dates to 1829 with the arrival of 12 families from the Isle of Arran, Scotland. Their descendants built two churches in the village: St. Andrew's Presbyterian (1862) and the old Methodist Church (1862), now a bronze foundry.

A record of the emigration from the Isle of Arran to Megantic County was written by Dugald McKenzie McKillop, the descendant of one of those who made the journey and is recorded in his book: "Annals of Megantic County, Quebec" published in 1902.
