= Quebec Route 267 =

Highway in Quebec, Canada

Route 267

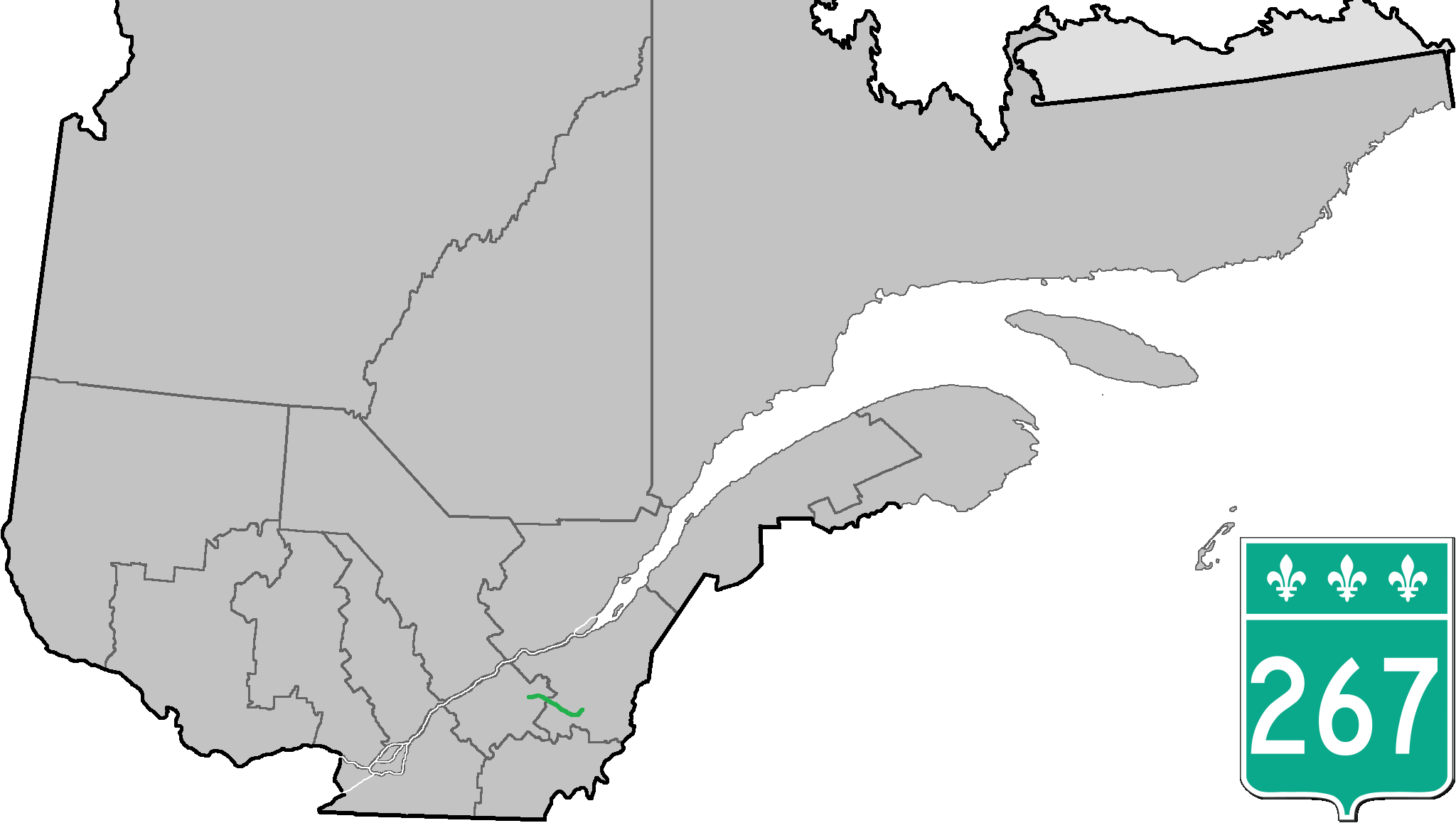

Route information
- Length: 64 km (40 mi)

Major junctions
- South end: R-269 near Adstock
- R-112 in Thetford Mines
- North end: R-116 near Plessisville

Location
- Country: Canada
- Province: Quebec
- Major cities: Thetford Mines, Plessisville

Highway system
- Quebec provincial highways; Autoroutes; List; Former
← R-265	→ R-269

Route 267 is a two-lane north/south highway on the south shore of the Saint Lawrence River in Quebec, Canada. Its northern terminus is in Plessisville at the junction of Route 265, and the southern terminus is at the junction of Route 269 in Adstock (secteur Saint-Méthode).

== List of towns along Route 267 ==
- Plessisville
- Laurierville
- Inverness
- Saint-Jean-de-Brébeuf
- Thetford Mines
- Adstock
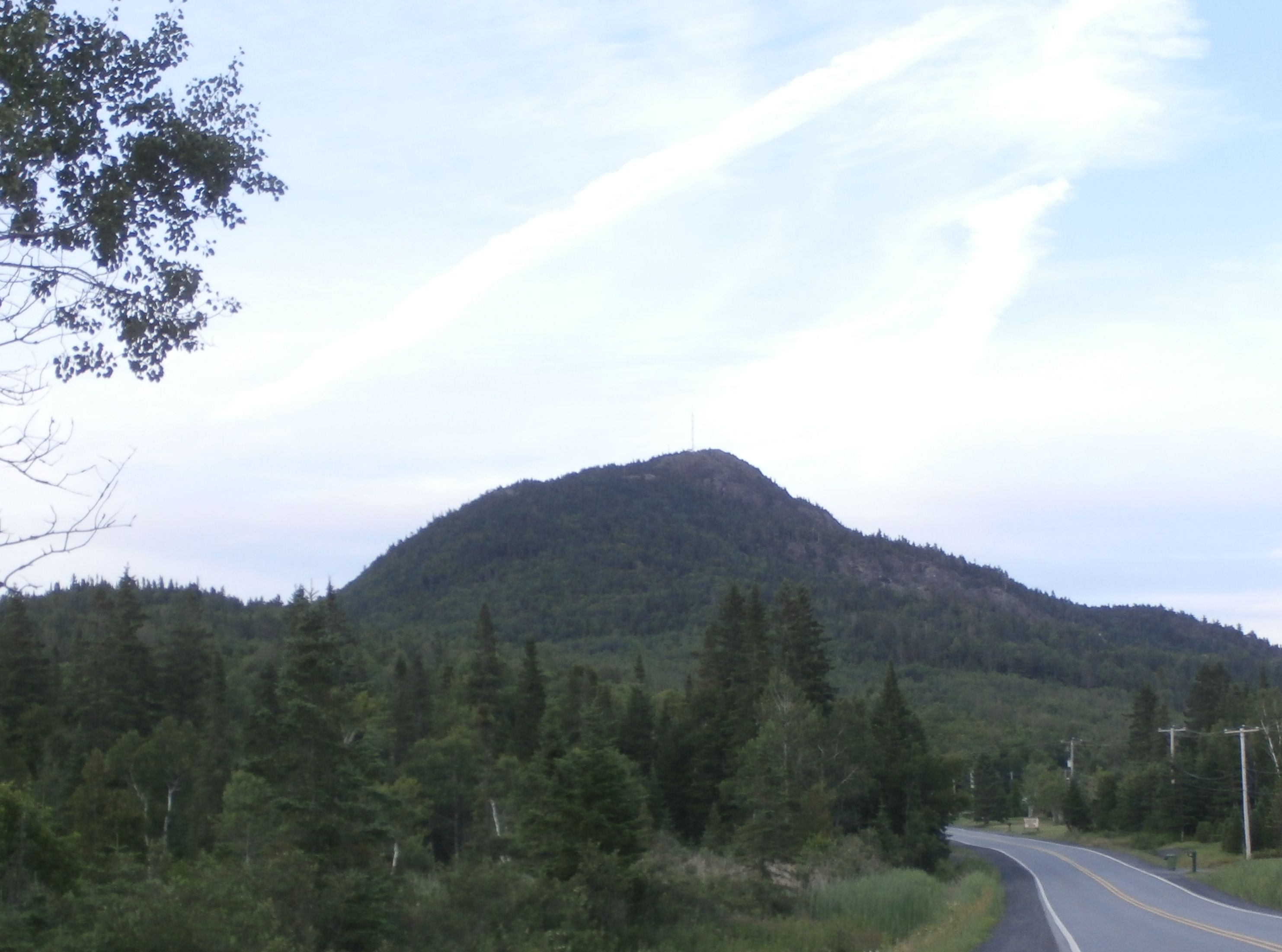
Mount Adstock near Saint-Daniel.

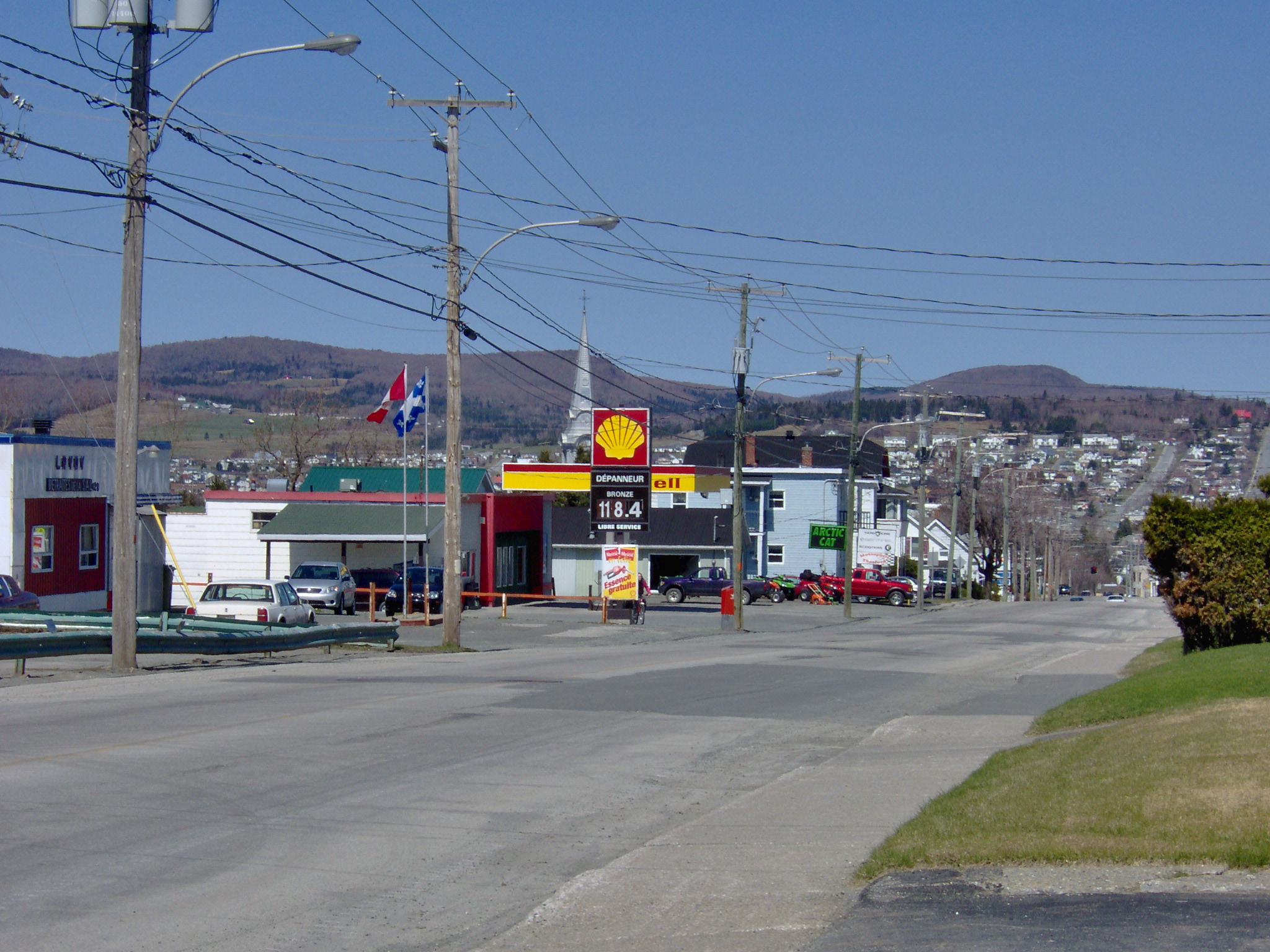
Saint-Alphonse street in Thetford Mines.

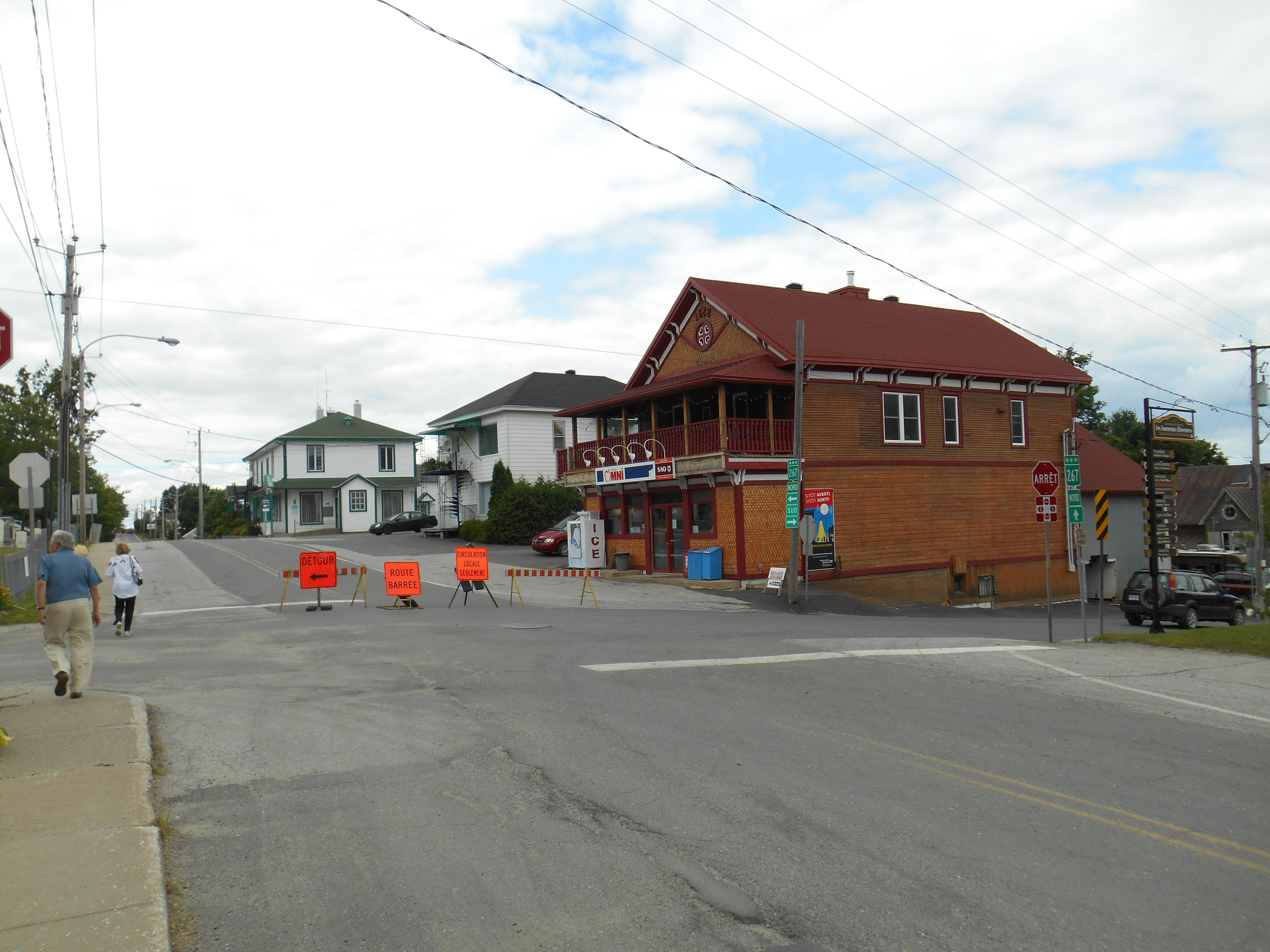
Dublin street in Inverness.

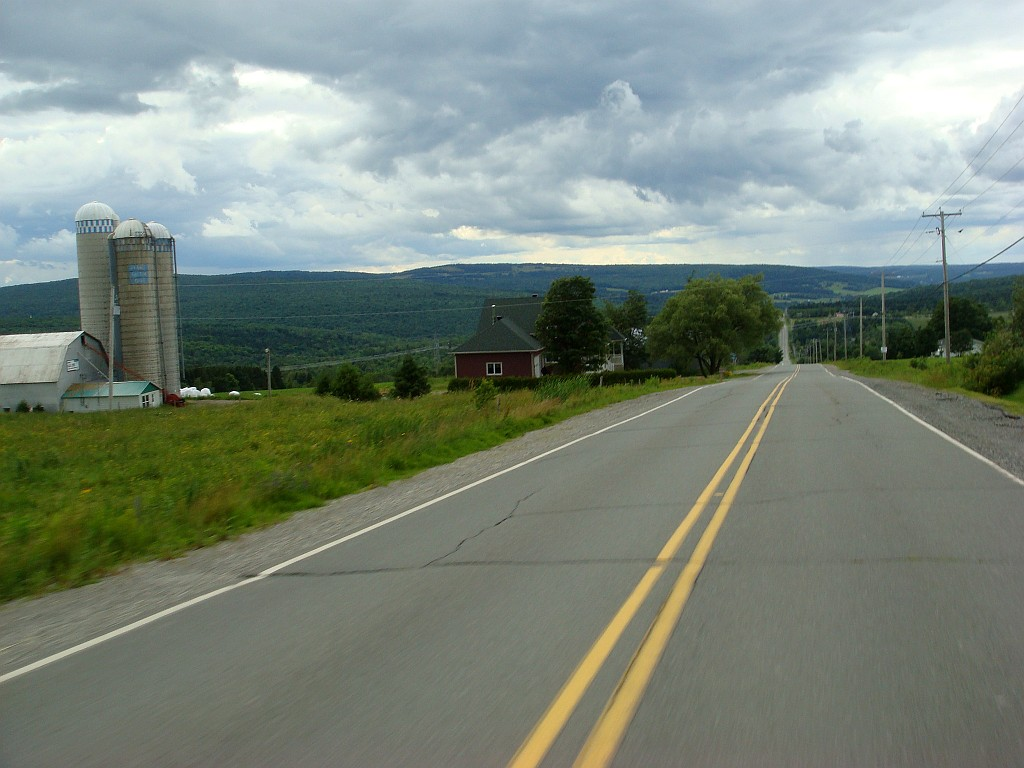
Quebec Route 267 in Inverness.

== See also ==
- List of Quebec provincial highways
