= Notre-Dame-de-Lourdes, Centre-du-Québec =

Notre-Dame-de-Lourdes
- Parish municipality

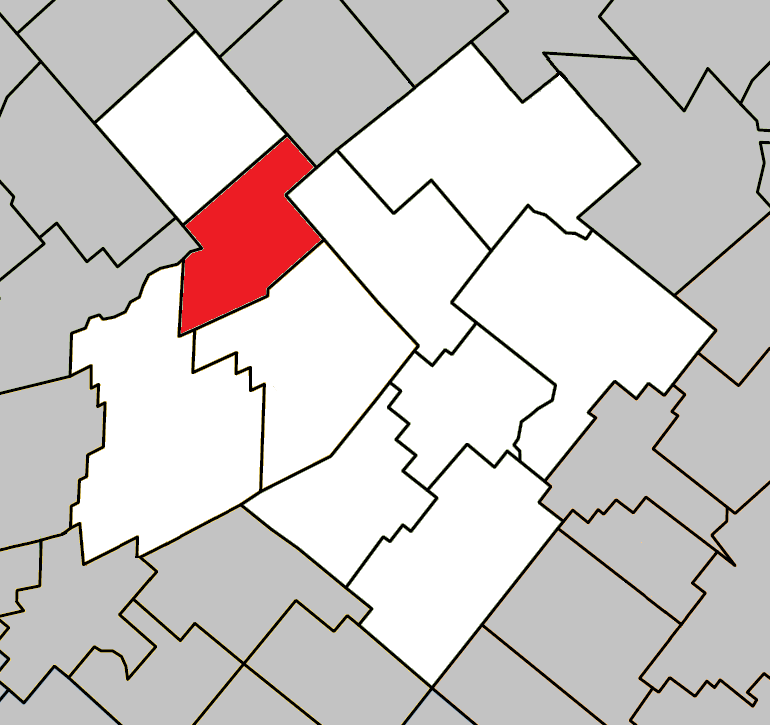
- Location within L'Érable RCM.

- Location in southern Quebec.
- Coordinates: 46°19′N 71°49′W
- Country: Canada
- Province: Quebec
- Region: Centre-du-Québec
- RCM: L'Érable
- Constituted: October 7, 1897

Government
  - Mayor: Jocelyn Bédard
  - Federal riding: Mégantic—L'Érable—Lotbinière
  - Prov. riding: Arthabaska–L'Érable

Area
  - Total: 83.50 km^{2} (32.24 sq mi)
  - Land: 81.39 km^{2} (31.42 sq mi)

Population (2021)
  - Total: 787
  - Density: 9.7/km^{2} (25/sq mi)
  - Pop 2016-2021: ▲14.4%
  - Dwellings: 361
- Time zone: UTC−5 (EST)
  - Summer (DST): UTC−4 (EDT)
- Postal code(s): G0S 1T0
- Area code: 819
- Highways: R-218; R-265
- Website: www.municipalite lourdes.com

Notre-Dame-de-Lourdes (French pronunciation: [nɔtʁə dam də luʁd]) is a parish municipality in Quebec.

== Demographics ==
In the 2021 Census of Population conducted by Statistics Canada, Notre-Dame-de-Lourdes had a population of 787 living in 332 of its 361 total private dwellings, a change of 14.4% from its 2016 population of 688. With a land area of 81.39 km^{2} (31.42 sq mi), it had a population density of 9.7/km^{2} (25.0/sq mi) in 2021.
