= Laurierville =

- Municipality
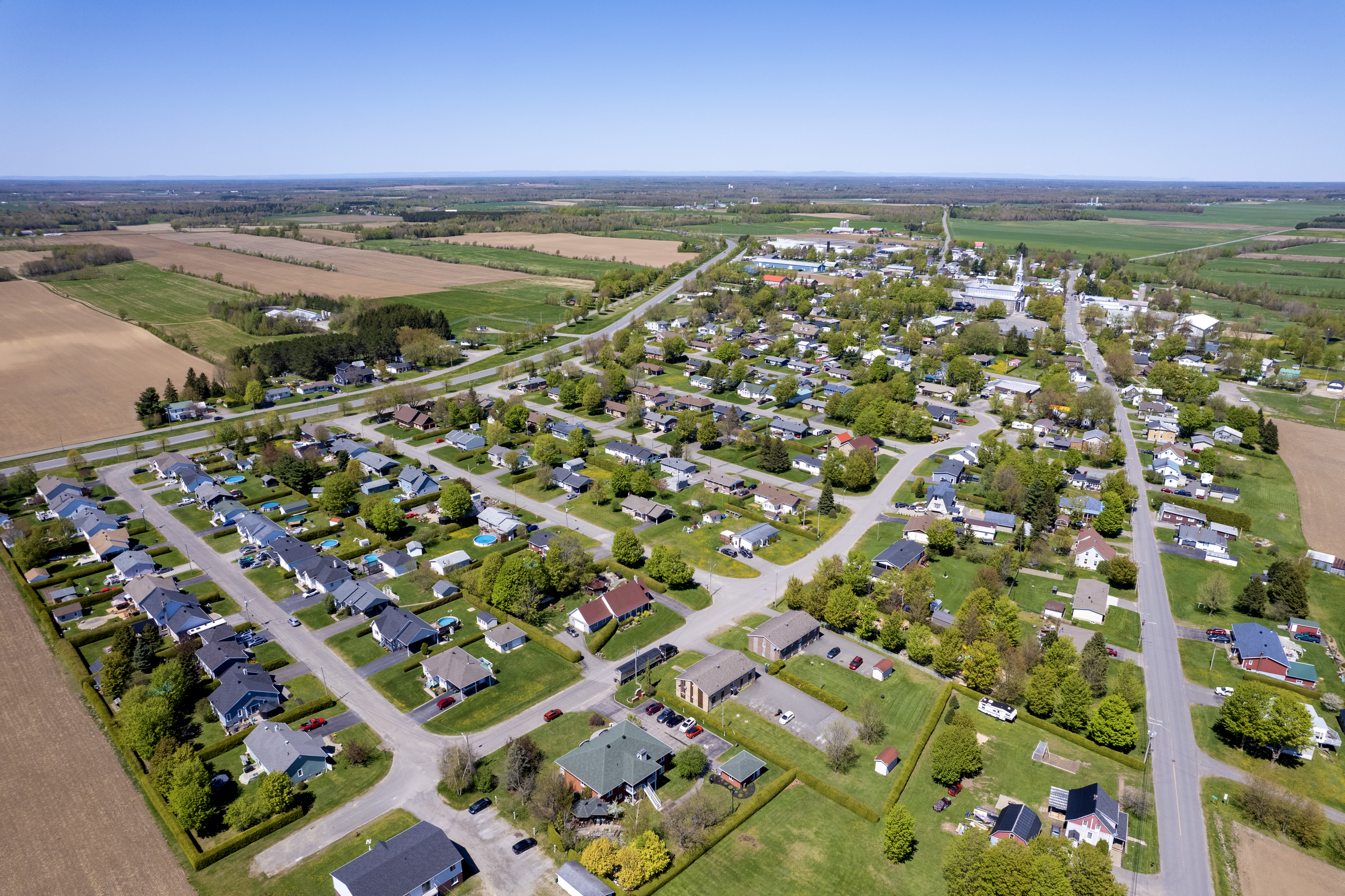
- Aerial view of Laurierville

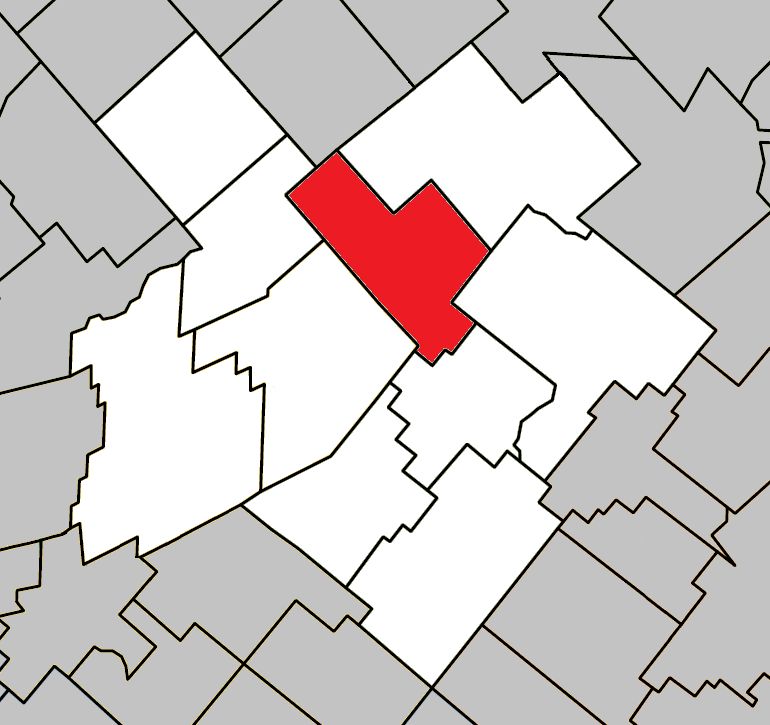
- Location within L'Érable RCM.

- Location in southern Quebec.
- Coordinates: 46°18′N 71°39′W
- Country: Canada
- Province: Quebec
- Region: Centre-du-Québec
- RCM: L'Érable
- Constituted: November 26, 1997

Government
  - Mayor: Pierre Cloutier
  - Federal riding: Mégantic—L'Érable—Lotbinière
  - Prov. riding: Arthabaska–L'Érable

Area
  - Total: 108.80 km^{2} (42.01 sq mi)
  - Land: 107.91 km^{2} (41.66 sq mi)

Population (2021)
  - Total: 1,313
  - Density: 12.2/km^{2} (32/sq mi)
  - Pop 2016-2021: ▼2.5%
  - Dwellings: 605
- Time zone: UTC−5 (EST)
  - Summer (DST): UTC−4 (EDT)
- Postal code(s): G0S 1P0
- Area code: 819
- Highways: R-116; R-218; R-267
- Website: www.laurierville.net

Laurierville (French pronunciation: [loʁjevil]) is a municipality in the Centre-du-Québec region of the province of Quebec in Canada.

It was constituted on November 26, 1997, by the amalgamation of the village municipality of Laurierville and the municipality of Sainte-Julie (the latter not to be confused with a different, modern-day Sainte-Julie in Montérégie). Laurierville contains the new storage warehouse of the Federation of Quebec Maple Syrup Producers.

== History ==
At the beginning of the 19th century, the area was still entirely unspoilt. At that time, that open territory, south of the Bécancour River, was known as Somerset. The first settler in the area was Laurent Poliquin, who cleared a 4-acre parcel of land on what is now the 9th rang. Others arrived in the early 1840s. They named the area Rivière-Noire, after the stream that ran through their land. In 1845, the Sainte-Julie-de-Somerset mission was founded. The first chapel was built in 1852, and the first parish priest, Édouard Dufour, settled there in 1854.

On January 1, 1855, the municipality of Sainte-Julie-de-Somerset was officially created. Three years later, in 1858, the name was changed to Somerset-Nord The same year, on November 17, the parish of Sainte-Julie-de-Somerset was canonically erected. A post office was opened in 1860. Gradually, the parish's nucleus gradually grew into a village. On 19 December 1902, the village became an independent legal entity and took the name of Laurierville. It was named Laurierville in honour of Sir Wilfrid Laurier, then Prime Minister of Canada. The name was one of a generation of toponymic names with the suffix -ville given to several municipalities in Centre-du-Québec during those years. The church was built between 1909 and 1911 to plans by architect Joseph-Pierre Ouellet.

Meanwhile, the municipality of Somerset-Nord, fully surrounding Laurierville, changed its name to Sainte-Julie in 1950. Finally, the current municipality of Laurierville was officially created in 1997 when Laurierville and Sainte-Julie merged. In 2017 Laurierville celebrated their 20 years of existence.

== Demographics ==
In the 2021 Census of Population conducted by Statistics Canada, Laurierville had a population of 1,313 living in 580 of its 605 total private dwellings, a change of −2.5% from its 2016 population of 1,346. With a land area of 107.91 km^{2} (41.66 sq mi), it had a population density of 12.2/km^{2} (31.5/sq mi) in 2021.

== Notable people ==
- Fernand Labrie, medical researcher
- Marie-Rose Turcot, writer
