= Quebec Route 165 =

Highway in Quebec, Canada

Route 165

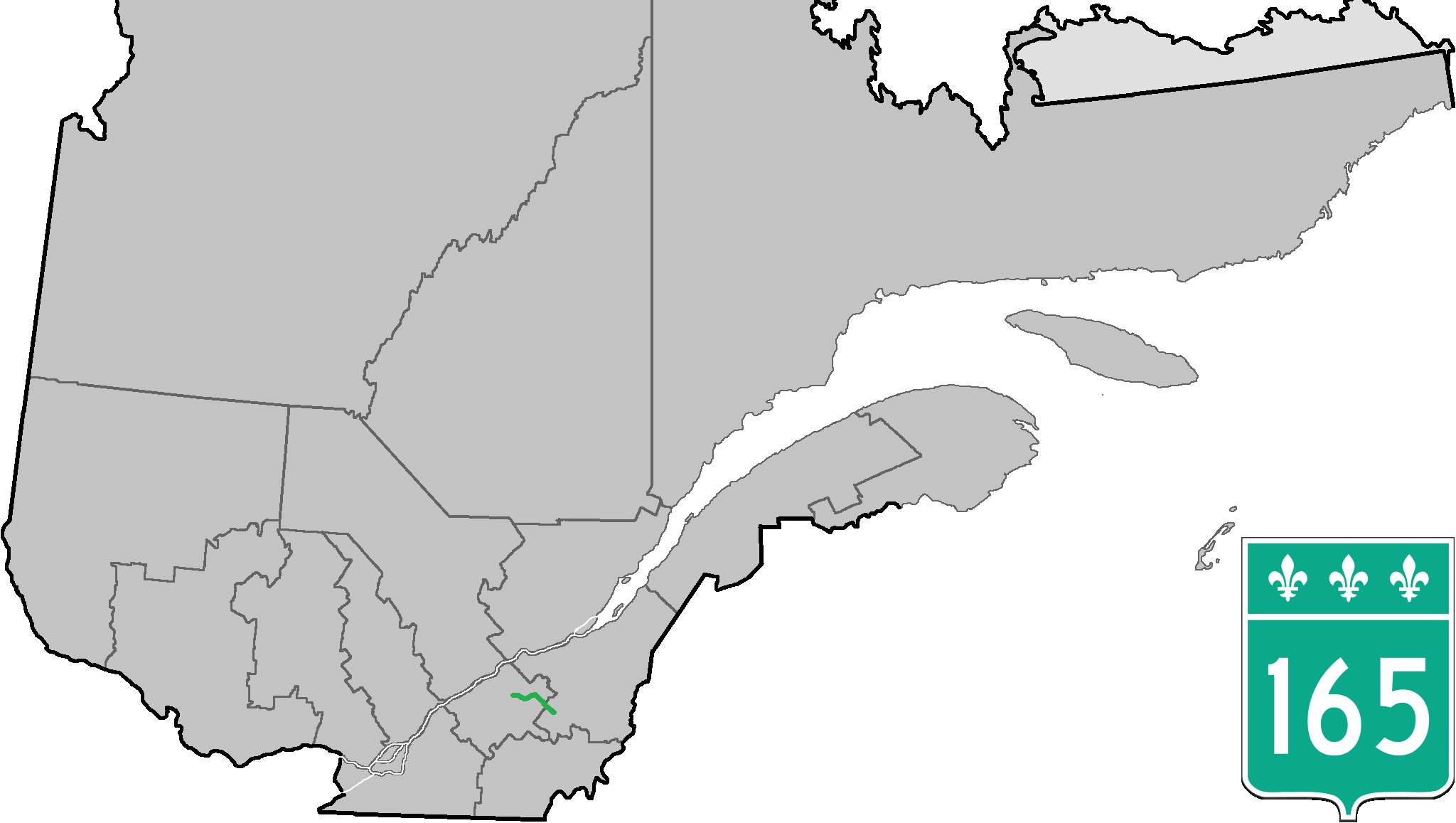

Route information
- Maintained by Transports Québec
- Length: 67.3 km (41.8 mi)

Major junctions
- South end: R-112 in Thetford Mines
- R-216 in Irlande; R-116 in Plessisville; R-116 / R-263 in Princeville; R-162 in Saint-Louis-de-Blandford
- North end: A-20 (TCH) in Saint-Louis-de-Blandford

Location
- Country: Canada
- Province: Quebec
- Major cities: Thetford Mines, Plessisville, Princeville

Highway system
- Quebec provincial highways; Autoroutes; List; Former
| ← R-162 | → R-167 |

Route 165 is a 68 km north–south highway on the south shore of the Saint Lawrence River in Quebec, Canada. Its southern terminus is in Black Lake, now part of Thetford Mines, at the junction of Route 112 and its northern terminus is in Saint-Louis-de-Blandford at the junction of Autoroute 20. The stretch between Plessisville and Black Lake used to be Route 265 but it was re-numbered Route 165 in the 1990s.

== Municipalities along Route 165 ==
- Thetford Mines
- Irlande
- Saint-Ferdinand
- Saint-Pierre-Baptiste
- Sainte-Sophie-d'Halifax
- Plessisville
- Princeville
- Saint-Louis-de-Blandford

== See also ==
- List of Quebec provincial highways
