= L'Érable Regional County Municipality =

L'Érable
- Regional county municipality
- Location in province of Quebec.
- Coordinates: 46°15′N 71°45′W
- Country: Canada
- Province: Quebec
- Region: Centre-du-Québec
- Effective: January 1, 1982
- County seat: Plessisville

Government
  - Type: Prefecture
  - Prefect: Sylvain Labrecque

Area
  - Total: 1,300.70 km^{2} (502.20 sq mi)
  - Land: 1,287.86 km^{2} (497.25 sq mi)

Population (2016)
  - Total: 23,425
  - Density: 18.2/km^{2} (47/sq mi)
  - Change 2011-2016: ▲0.3%
  - Dwellings: 11,315
- Time zone: UTC−5 (EST)
  - Summer (DST): UTC−4 (EDT)
- Area code: 819
- Website: www.mrc-erable.qc.ca

L'Érable (French pronunciation: [leʁabl], Maple) is a regional county municipality in the Centre-du-Québec region of Quebec, Canada. Named for its maple trees, the area is rural in nature and is located 50 km (31 mi) southwest of Quebec City. Its seat is Plessisville.

== Subdivisions ==
There are 10 subdivisions within the RCM:

Cities & Towns (2)

- Plessisville
- Princeville

Municipalities (6)

- Inverness
- Laurierville
- Lyster
- Sainte-Sophie-d'Halifax
- Saint-Ferdinand
- Villeroy

Parishes (2)

- Notre-Dame-de-Lourdes
- Saint-Pierre-Baptiste

== Demographics ==
Mother tongue from 2016 Canadian Census

Language	Population	Pct (%)
French only	22,735	98.3%
English only	150	0.6%
Both English and French	50	0.2%
Other languages	200	0.9%

== Transportation ==
=== Access Routes ===
Highways and numbered routes that run through the municipality, including external routes that start or finish at the county border:

- Autoroutes
  - None
- Principal Highways
  - R-116
  - R-165
- Secondary Highways
  - R-218
  - R-263
  - R-265
  - R-267
- External Routes
  - None

== See also ==
- List of regional county municipalities and equivalent territories in Quebec
