= Plessisville =

- City
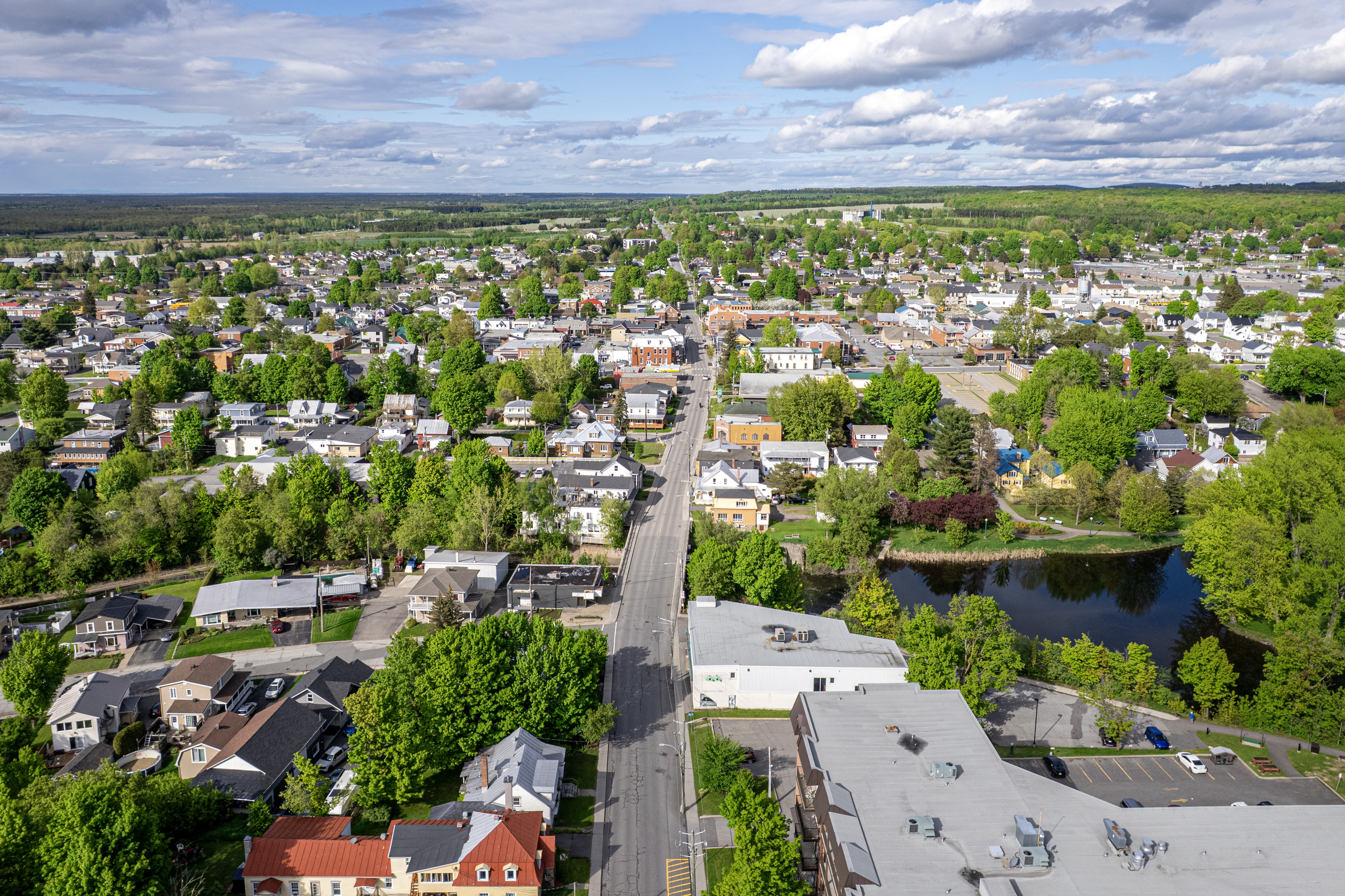
- Plessisville in 2025

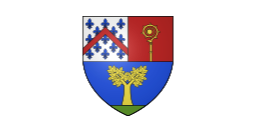
- Flag Coat of arms
- Motto: "Meliora paramus" (We are preparing better things)
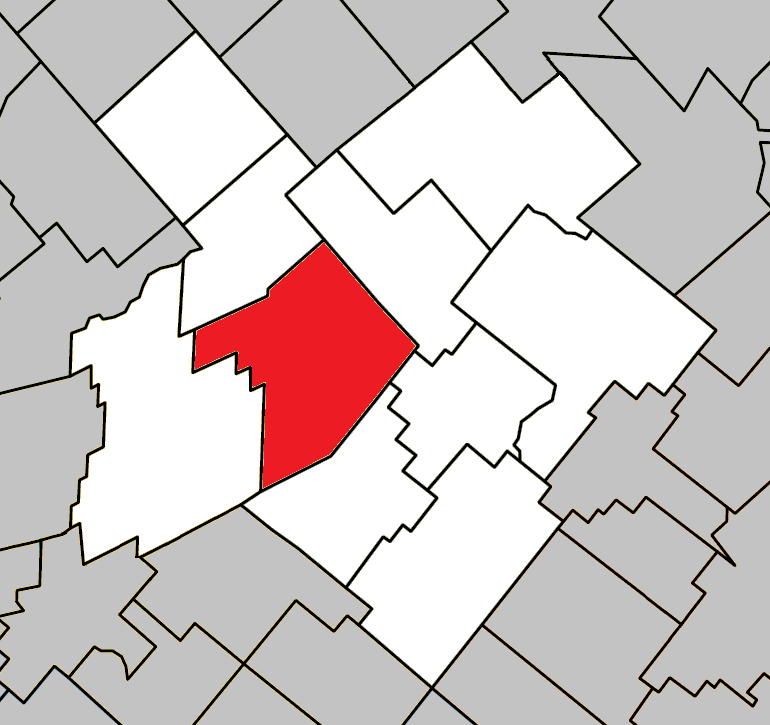
- Location within L'Érable RCM.

- Location in southern Quebec.
- Coordinates: 46°13′N 71°47′W
- Country: Canada
- Province: Quebec
- Region: Centre-du-Québec
- RCM: L'Érable
- Constituted: January 1, 2024

Government
  - Mayor: Marc Morin
  - Federal riding: Mégantic—L'Érable—Lotbinière
  - Prov. riding: Arthabaska–L'Érable

Area
  - City: 145.85 km^{2} (56.31 sq mi)
  - Land: 146.11 km^{2} (56.41 sq mi)
  - Urban: 5.87 km^{2} (2.27 sq mi)

Population (2021)
  - City: 9,069
  - Density: 62.1/km^{2} (161/sq mi)
  - Urban: 7,028
  - Urban density: 1,197.7/km^{2} (3,102/sq mi)
  - Pop 2016-2021: ▼1.6%
  - Dwellings: 4,547
- Time zone: UTC−5 (EST)
  - Summer (DST): UTC−4 (EDT)
- Postal code(s): G6L
- Area code: 819
- Highways: R-116; R-165; R-265; R-267
- Website: www.ville.plessisville.qc.ca

Plessisville (French pronunciation: [plɛsivil]) is a county seat of L'Érable Regional County Municipality, Quebec, Canada. Routes 116 and 165 go through it. The city is 185 km from Montreal and 95 km from Quebec City. The city has hosted an annual Maple festival since 1958, and the Institut québécois de l'érable (Quebec Maple Institute) is headquartered there. The production of maple syrup and maple products is a major industry in the entire area, even giving the regional county municipality its name (érable is French for "maple").

The first person to permanently settle in the area was Jean-Baptiste Lafond, in 1835. First incorporated as the village of Somerset, the settlement was officially incorporated as the village of Plessisville in 1855 in honour of Monseigneur Octave Plessis, bishop of Quebec at the time. In 2024, the city and the parish merged to form the current city.

== History ==
Plessisville was officially established on January 1, 2024, following the merger of the former city of Plessisville and the parish municipality of Plessisville.

Plessisville's history dates back to 1835, when its first resident, Jean-Baptiste Lafond, settled in the area. By 1845, the population had grown to approximately 143 people, making it the oldest municipality in the Bois-Francs region.

In 1885, a fire destroyed sixty homes, the foundry, the presbytery, and the church, marking a major turning point in its development.

== Demographics ==
In the 2021 Census of Population conducted by Statistics Canada, the merged city of Plessisville had a population of 9,069 living in 4,220 of its 4,547 total private dwellings, a change of −1.6% from its 2016 population of 9,214. With a land area of 146.11 km^{2} (56.41 sq mi), it had a population density of 62.1/km^{2} (160.8/sq mi) in 2021.

Historical Census Data – Plessisville, Quebec

Year	Pop.	±%
1861	666	—
1871	721	+8.3%
1881	776	+7.6%
1891	1,323	+70.5%
1901	1,586	+19.9%
1911	1,559	−1.7%
1921	2,032	+30.3%
1931	2,536	+24.8%

Year	Pop.	±%
1941	3,522	+38.9%
1951	5,094	+44.6%
1956	5,829	+14.4%
1961	6,570	+12.7%
1966	7,238	+10.2%
1971	7,204	−0.5%
1976	7,238	+0.5%
1981	7,249	+0.2%

Year	Pop.	±%
1986	7,042	−2.9%
1991	6,952	−1.3%
1996	6,810	−2.0%
2001	6,756	−0.8%
2006	6,677	−1.2%
2011	6,688	+0.2%
2016	6,551	−2.0%
2021	6,414	−2.1%

Source: Statistics Canada

== Notable people ==
- Denis Blondin, anthropologist
- Mavrik Bourque, hockey player
- Pierre Bourque, saxophonist
- Pierre-Andre Fournier, Roman Catholic Archbishop
- Raymond Garneau, politician
- Louis-Édouard Roberge, politician
- François-Théodore Savoie, politician
- Pierre Vachon, president of IB Quebec

== Sources ==
- (in English) Official City website
- (in English) Quebec Maple Institute
- (in French) Maple Festival
