= Rivière aux Ormes (Petite rivière du Chêne) =

River in Centre-du-Québec, Quebec (Canada)

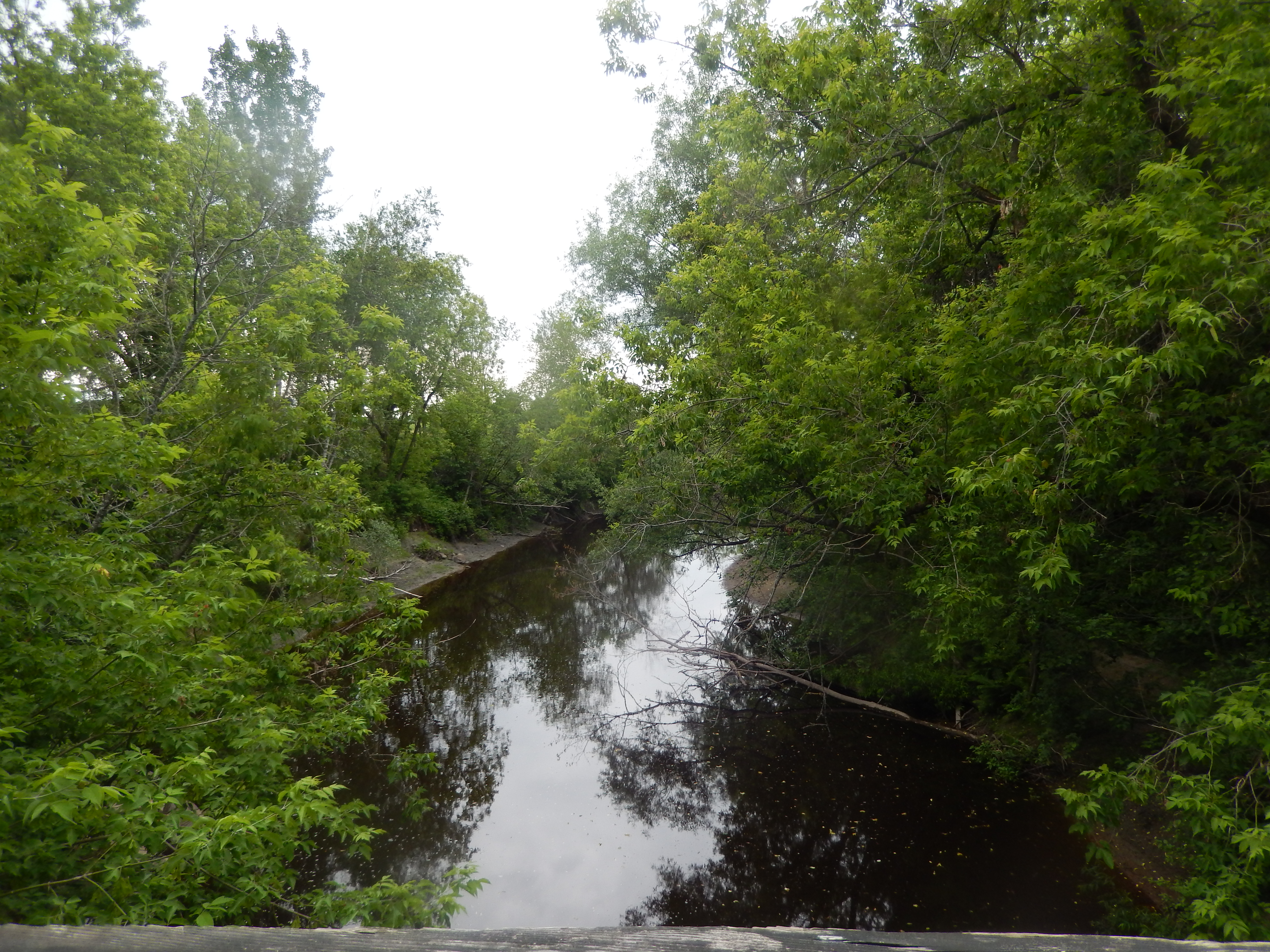
- Rivière aux Ormes at Fortierville seen from the bridge of the “Le Petit-Deschaillons” cycle path.

- Location within Quebec

Location
- Country: Canada
- Province: Quebec
- Region: Centre-du-Québec
- MRC: L'Érable Regional County Municipality, Bécancour Regional County Municipality

Physical characteristics
- Source: Agricultural and forest streams
  - location: Villeroy
  - coordinates: 46.401926°N 71.834963°W
  - elevation: 122 metres (400 ft)
- Mouth: Petite rivière du Chêne
  - location: Parisville et Fortierville
  - coordinates: 46.48944°N 72.07972°W
  - elevation: 32 metres (105 ft)
- Length: 20.6 kilometres (12.8 mi)

Basin features
- River system: St. Lawrence River
- Tributaries
  - left: (upstream) ruisseau Le Siphon
  - right: (upstream) Bras du Nord de la rivière aux Ormes

The rivière aux Ormes (in English: Elm River) is a tributary of the east bank of the Petite rivière du Chêne which empties on the south bank of the St. Lawrence River. The Rivière des Ormes flows through the municipalities of Villeroy (MRC L'Érable Regional County Municipality), Sainte-Françoise and Fortierville, in the Bécancour Regional County Municipality, in the administrative region of Centre-du-Québec, in Quebec, in Canada.

== Geography ==
The main hydrographic slopes near the "Rivière aux Ormes" are:

- north side: Petite rivière du Chêne, L'Espérance stream, rivière du Chêne, St. Lawrence River;
- east side: northern arm of the rivière aux Ormes, rivière du Chêne, Creuse river;
- south side: Petite rivière du Chêne, Creuse river, Gentilly River, Bécancour River;
- west side: Petite rivière du Chêne, St. Lawrence River, rivière aux Orignaux, rivière aux Glaises.

The "rivière aux Ormes" originates north of highway 20, near exit 253. This head area is located 5.9 kilometres (3.7 mi) west of the center from the village of Val-Alain, 8.1 kilometres (5.0 mi) north of the village of Notre-Dame-de-Lourdes and 3.1 kilometres (1.9 mi) east of the village center of Villeroy.

From its head area, the "rivière aux Ormes" flows over 29.6 kilometres (18.4 mi) with a drop of 90 metres (300 ft), divided into the following segments:

- 1.1 kilometres (0.68 mi) north-west, in Villeroy, to the "route du rang 16e Ouest";
- 2.1 kilometres (1.3 mi) north-west, up to a country road;
- 3.8 kilometres (2.4 mi) to the north-west, to the municipal limit between Villeroy and Sainte-Françoise;
- 6.3 kilometres (3.9 mi) north-west, up to the 11e rang road, which it crosses 1.5 kilometres (0.93 mi) north-east of the center of the village of Sainte-Françoise;
- 3.4 kilometres (2.1 mi) north-west, up to the tenth rang road;
- 1.3 kilometres (0.81 mi) north, to the limit between the municipalities of Sainte-Françoise and Fortierville;
- 1.7 kilometres (1.1 mi) north, up to the 9e rang West road, which it crosses 1.7 kilometres (1.1 mi) east of the center of the village of Fortierville;
- 0.4 kilometres (0.25 mi) north, to the confluence of the northern arm of the rivière aux Ormes;
- 2.1 kilometres (1.3 mi) north, to a country road;
- 2.7 kilometres (1.7 mi) (or 1.1 kilometres (0.68 mi) in a direct line) south-west, winding up to route 265;
- 4.7 kilometres (2.9 mi) west, to its confluence.

The Ormes river flows on the east bank of the Petite rivière du Chêne. Its confluence is located at the limit between the municipalities of Fortierville and Parisville. This confluence is located 7.0 kilometres (4.3 mi) (or 2.3 kilometres (1.4 mi) in a direct line) downstream from the route 226 bridge, 3.2 kilometres (2.0 mi) west of the center of the village of Fortierville, 7.8 kilometres (4.8 mi) south of the village center of Deschaillons-sur-Saint-Laurent, 3.2 kilometres (2.0 mi) southwest of the village center of Parisville and 6.9 kilometres (4.3 mi) south north-east of the village center of Sainte-Sophie-de-Lévrard.

== Toponymy ==
The toponym “Rivière aux Ormes” was made official on December 5, 1968, at the Commission de toponymie du Québec.

== See also ==
- List of rivers of Quebec
