= Petite rivière du Chêne =

River in Centre-du-Québec, Quebec (Canada)

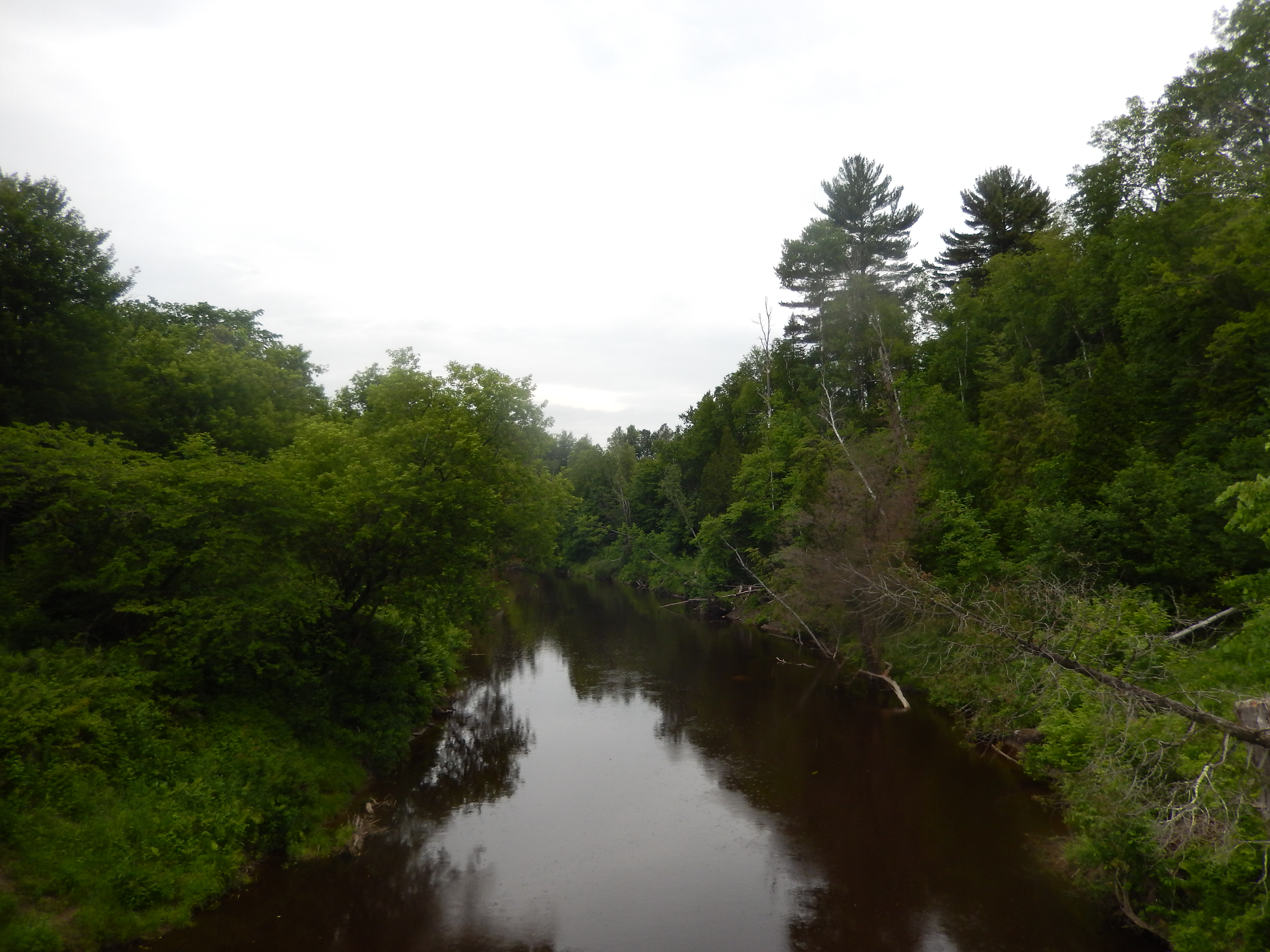
- Petite rivière du Chêne from the bridge of the “Le Petit-Deschaillons” cycle path

- Location within Quebec

Location
- Country: Canada
- Province: Quebec
- Region: Centre-du-Québec
- MRC: L'Érable Regional County Municipality, Bécancour Regional County Municipality

Physical characteristics
- Source: Agricultural and forest streams
  - location: Notre-Dame-de-Lourdes
  - coordinates: 46.34438°N 71.87912°W
  - elevation: 128 metres (420 ft)
- Mouth: St. Lawrence River
  - location: Deschaillons-sur-Saint-Laurent
  - coordinates: 46.55722°N 72.03833°W
  - elevation: 5 metres (16 ft)
- Length: 35.4 kilometres (22.0 mi)

Basin features
- River system: St. Lawrence River
- Tributaries
  - left: (upstream) ruisseau de la Route de l'Église, ruisseau Tousignant, ruisseau de la Plaine, ruisseau Zéphirin-Mailhot, ruisseau Paradis, ruisseau Saint-Cyr, ruisseau Plourde, cours d'eau Saint-Pierre, ruisseau Soucy.
  - right: (upstream) ruisseau L'Espérance, ruisseau du Castor, ruisseau Saint-Charles, ruisseau Saint-Charles-Ouest, ruisseau de la Décharge, rivière aux Ormes, ruisseau des Trembles, Creuse River, ruisseau Morin, ruisseau Geoffroy, ruisseau Patry, Branche Est.

The Petite rivière du Chêne (in English: Little Oak River) is a tributary of the south shore of the St. Lawrence River, in Quebec, in Canada. This river flows in the municipalities of Notre-Dame-de-Lourdes, Villeroy (MRC de L'Érable Regional County Municipality), Manseau, Fortierville, Parisville and Deschaillons-sur-Saint-Laurent (MRC de Bécancour Regional County Municipality), in the administrative region of Centre-du-Québec.

== Geography ==
The main neighboring watersheds of the Petite rivière du Chêne are:

- North side: St. Lawrence River;
- East side: L'Esperance stream, rivière au Chêne, rivière aux Ormes, Creuse River, Geoffroy stream;
- South side: Bécancour River;
- West side: St. Lawrence River, rivière aux Orignaux, rivière aux Glaises.

The Petite rivière du Chêne has its source in a forest zone, south of a marsh area, south of highway 20, at 3.6 kilometres (2.2 mi) at north of the village of Lourdes, in the municipality of Notre-Dame-de-Lourdes (almost on the edge of Villeroy).

From its head area, the Petite rivière du Chêne flows over 63 kilometres (39 mi) with a drop of 123 metres (404 ft), divided into the following segments:

Upper course of the river (segment of 35.4 kilometres (22.0 mi))

- 6.6 kilometres (4.1 mi) west, in Villeroy, to the municipal limit of Manseau (MRC de Bécancour Regional County Municipality);
- 1.1 kilometres (0.68 mi) west, to highway 20;
- 2.9 kilometres (1.8 mi) west, up to route 218;
- 5.6 kilometres (3.5 mi) towards the north-west, winding until it comes back to cross route 218 south of the village of Manseau;
- 8.3 kilometres (5.2 mi) north-west, winding up to the tenth and 11th rang road;
- 5.3 kilometres (3.3 mi) north, winding up to the road to rang Saint-Agathe;
- 4.2 kilometres (2.6 mi) (or 1.1 kilometres (0.68 mi) in a direct line) north, winding up to the confluence of the Creuse river (coming from the east).

Lower course of the river (segment of 28.2 kilometres (17.5 mi))

From the confluence of the Creuse River, the Petite rivière du Chêne flows over:

- 5.2 kilometres (3.2 mi) (or 3.2 kilometres (2.0 mi) in a direct line) towards the north, winding up to the confluence of the rivière aux Ormes (coming from the east);
- 7.0 kilometres (4.3 mi) (or 2.3 kilometres (1.4 mi) in a direct line) north-west, meandering along route 226;
- 9.3 kilometres (5.8 mi) (or 4.3 kilometres (2.7 mi) in a direct line) north-east, winding up to route 265;
- 6.3 kilometres (3.9 mi) (or 3.8 kilometres (2.4 mi) in a direct line) northeast, winding up to route 132;
- 0.4 kilometres (0.25 mi) eastward to its confluence.

The Petite rivière du Chêne flows over the flats of the south shore of the Estuary of Saint Lawrence, at the limit of Deschaillons and Leclercville. Its confluence is located at Pointe Des Robert, 3.3 kilometres (2.1 mi) west of the center of the village of Leclercville, at 4.4 kilometres (2.7 mi) north-east of the center of the village of Parisville and 5.6 kilometres (3.5 mi) east of the center of the village of Deschaillons. It is also located at 3.3 kilometres (2.1 mi) west of the confluence of Rivière du Chêne and 18.3 kilometres (11.4 mi) east of the confluence of Rivière aux Orignaux.

== Toponymy ==
In the Abenaki language the "little river" is like its "big neighbor" Rivière du Chêne (wachilmezi) like an oak acorn (wachil).

The toponym Petite rivière du Chêne was formalized on December 5, 1968, at the Commission de toponymie du Québec.

== See also ==
- List of rivers of Quebec
