= Creuse River (Petite rivière du Chêne) =

River in Centre-du-Québec, Quebec (Canada)

- Location within Quebec
- Native name: Rivière Creuse (French)

Location
- Country: Canada
- Province: Quebec
- Region: Centre-du-Québec
- MRC: L'Érable Regional County Municipality, Bécancour Regional County Municipality

Physical characteristics
- Source: Agricultural and forest streams
  - location: Villeroy
  - coordinates: 46.389359°N 71.845865°W
  - elevation: 129 metres (423 ft)
- Mouth: Petite rivière du Chêne
  - location: Fortierville
  - coordinates: 46.45889°N 72.07278°W
  - elevation: 47 metres (154 ft)
- Length: 18.4 kilometres (11.4 mi)

Basin features
- River system: St. Lawrence River
- Tributaries
  - left: (upstream) ruisseau Le Siphon
  - right: (upstream) Bras du Nord de la rivière aux Ormes

The Creuse river (in French: rivière Creuse) is a tributary of the east bank of the Petite rivière du Chêne which flows onto the south bank of the St. Lawrence River. The Creuse river flows through the municipalities of Villeroy (MRC de L'Érable Regional County Municipality), Sainte-Françoise and Fortierville, in the Bécancour Regional County Municipality, in the administrative region of Centre-du-Québec, in Quebec, in Canada.

== Geography ==
The main neighboring hydrographic slopes of the Creuse river are:

- north side: Petite rivière du Chêne, rivière aux Ormes, northern arm of Rivière aux Ormes, stream L'Espérance, rivière du Chêne, St. Lawrence River;
- east side: Chêne river;
- south side: Petite rivière du Chêne, Gentilly River, rivière du Moulin, Bécancour River;
- west side: Petite rivière du Chêne, St. Lawrence River, rivière aux Orignaux, rivière aux Glaises.

The Creuse River originates north of the Villeroy rest area of the highway 20, near exit 253. This head area is located at 9.6 kilometres (6.0 mi) west of the center of the village of Val-Alain, at 7.0 kilometres (4.3 mi) north of the village of Notre-Dame-de-Lourdes and 2.0 kilometres (1.2 mi) east of the center of the village of Villeroy.

From its source, the Creuse river flows over 18.4 kilometres (11.4 mi), with a drop of 82 metres (269 ft), divided into the following segments:

- 1.7 kilometres (1.1 mi) north-west, up to the 16th rang west road that it crosses at 1.0 kilometre (0.62 mi) north-east of the center from the village of Villeroy;
- 1.4 kilometres (0.87 mi) westward, passing the north side of the village of Villeroy, to route 265;
- 4.8 kilometres (3.0 mi) towards the north-west, passing to the south-west of an experimental farm, up to the municipal limit between Villeroy and Sainte-Françoise;
- 2.0 kilometres (1.2 mi) north-west to a country road;
- 4.4 kilometres (2.7 mi) north-west, up to a road from tenth and 11th rang;
- 0.9 kilometres (0.56 mi) north-west, winding up to the municipal limit between Sainte-Françoise and Fortierville;
- 1.7 kilometres (1.1 mi) towards the west, winding up to the ninth rang road;
- 1.5 kilometres (0.93 mi) towards the west, winding up to its confluence.

The Creuse river flows onto the east bank of the Petite rivière du Chêne. Its confluence is located at the limit of Rang Frontenac and Rang Saint-Alphonse, at the limit between the municipalities of Fortierville, and Sainte-Sophie-de-Lévrard. This confluence is located 4.2 kilometres (2.6 mi) downstream from the road bridge of the rang Saint-Agathe and at 5.2 kilometres (3.2 mi) (or 3.2 kilometres (2.0 mi) online direct) from the confluence of the Rivière aux Ormes. It is also located 3.9 kilometres (2.4 mi) southwest of the village center of Fortierville and 4.1 kilometres (2.5 mi) northeast of the village center of Sainte-Sophie-de-Lévrard.

== Toponymy ==
The toponym “Rivière Creuse” was made official on December 18, 1979, at the Commission de toponymie du Québec.

== See also ==
- List of rivers of Quebec
