= Creuse (disambiguation) =

Creuse is a département in central France.

Creuse may also refer to:

- Creuse, Somme, a commune of the Somme département, France
- Creuse (river), a river in western France
- La Creuse, a commune in the Haute-Saône department
- Petite Creuse, a river in Allier and Creuse departments, France
- Creuse River (Petite rivière du Chêne), a river in Quebec, Canada

== People with the surname ==
- Auguste de Creuse (1806–1839), French portrait painter

== See also ==
- Creus (disambiguation)
