= Creus =

Creus means crosses in Catalan. It may refer to:

- Cap de Creus, Spain
- Santes Creus, Spain

== People with the surname ==
- Alicia Creus (born 1939), Argentine artist
- Antonio Creus (1924–1996), Spanish motorcycle racer
- Camille Decreus (1876–1939), French composer and pianist
- Joan Abella i Creus (born 1968), Spanish mineralogist
- Joan Creus (born 1956), Spanish basketball player
- Julian Creus (1917–1992), British weightlifter
- Miguel Albareda Creus (1919–2012), Spanish chess player
- Teresa Claramunt Creus (1862–1931), Spanish anarcho-syndicalist
- Xavi (footballer, born 1980) Hernández Creus (born 1980), Spanish football player

== See also ==
- Creuse (disambiguation)
