= Aurore Gagnon =

Canadian child abuse victim

- Born: Marie-Aurore-Lucienne Gagnon; 31 May 1909; Sainte-Philomène-de-Fortierville, Quebec, Canada
- Died: 12 February 1920 (aged 10); Sainte-Philomène-de-Fortierville, Quebec, Canada
- Cause of death: Sepsis and fatigue
- Resting place: Fortierville Cemetery
- Known for: Being a victim of child abuse

Marie-Aurore-Lucienne Gagnon, simply known as Aurore Gagnon (31 May 1909 – 12 February 1920), was a French Canadian girl who was a victim of severe and brutal child abuse. She died of severe abuse and blood poisoning from more than 54 wounds inflicted by her stepmother, Marie-Anne Houde, and her father, Télesphore Gagnon.

The story of Aurore Gagnon as l'enfant martyre (English translation: Martyr Child ) received great attention in the media.

== Abuse of Aurore Gagnon ==
Shortly after their mother's death and funeral, and their father's marriage to Marie-Anne Houde, Aurore Gagnon and her elder sister Marie-Jeanne and younger brother Georges-Étienne were sent to temporarily live with their maternal grandparents at their house over there, for several months in the neighbouring rural village of Leclercville, the same rural village where the five-year-old Lucina Gagnon had earlier had died on 13 November 1917, while staying with her maternal grandparents at their house over there.

== Death and aftermath ==
The autopsy was conducted in the church sacristy by Dr. Albert Marois, on 13 February, the next day after Aurore Gagnon's death, who indeed confirmed that Aurore had multiple severe wounds, was badly bruised across her entire body, and that the skin on her hands and wrists had indeed ripped down off to the bone.

According to the medical reports of the girl's autopsy by Dr. Albert Marois who had reportedly noticed more than 54 wounds all over the girl's body, with most of these wounds being severe, and even more bruises and lacerations, the wounds were caused as a result of multiple severe blows administered over time and done to the girl over a very long and extended period of time. The doctor had confirmed that almost all of the wounds and bruises had not healed properly as the girl had constantly endured further and more recent heavy and severe blows, and that the girl's old wounds which had started to heal, constantly endured further heavy blows again, which had prevented the stage of proper healing from taking place in almost all of her wounds and bruises. The girl had both old and new wounds across her entire body, very few of which had actually healed properly by the time of her death and was only significantly worsened by further heavy blows administered and prolonged over time; as a result, according to Dr. Albert Marois, this had eventually led to the girl suffering from extreme physical weakness, fatigue, stress, and blood poisoning caused by multiple severe wounds which were not treated or had healed properly at all, over a long and extended period of time. She kept enduring constant newer severe blows, which led to the girl being in a state of extreme physical weakness, fatigue, and delirium in the last day of her life.

The most severe wound was located on the side of Aurore's skull. Aurore's scalp was covered in dried and rotten pus and blood, her back was covered in blood as well, and her left thigh was deeply swollen. According to Dr. Albert Marois, the skin on the girl's hands and wrists had been flayed and had ripped off down to the bone as a result of the skin on her hands and wrists being constantly and severely burned by extremely hot objects (such as the aforementioned hot metal poker), which was administered over a long and extended period of time and left untreated and, therefore, had not healed properly at all.

Marie-Anne Houde was convicted of murder and initially was sentenced to death by hanging at the gallows almost immediately after her trials had ended, although the court shifted her death sentence because Marie-Anne Houde had turned out to be pregnant for already several months.

Following his arrest for the severe abuse and murder of his daughter Aurore Gagnon in 1920, Télesphore Gagnon was convicted of manslaughter and sentenced to life in prison. However, although Télesphore Gagnon had openly admitted to having severely beaten his daughter Aurore multiple times, he reportedly said that he only severely beaten and whipped her until "she bled" as a means of controlling her "evil and vicious behavior" and that he was simply disciplining his daughter as any "good father" would do with a "unruly and misbehaving" child and he stated that he knew that his second wife Marie-Anne Houde would beat Aurore for the "exact same reasons he did" to instill "discipline" and "control" in her. However, according to Telesphore, he claimed that he never saw his second wife Marie-Anne Houde beat Aurore in front of him, not even one time.

The jury and court eventually decided not to convict Télesphore Gagnon of murder of his daughter since they believed that his second wife Marie-Anne Houde had manipulated him into severely beating and abusing his daughter Aurore Gagnon and that she constantly lied to him that Aurore was a "evil and vicious" child who needed to be "beaten as much as possible", which they believed had caused Télesphore Gagnon to have a "false and distorted" impression of his daughter Aurore's character and personality. After five years of imprisonment, Télesphore Gagnon was released from prison and given parole in 1925, on the grounds of good behaviour during his time in prison, and he seems to have never caused trouble during his imprisonment and he acted "overly obedient", compared to most other prisoners. Télesphore Gagnon reportedly suffered from throat cancer, which doctors had believed would kill him within several months. However, Télesphore Gagnon survived and fully recovered from his throat cancer and returned to his native rural village, Fortierville, and previous life. He wrote several letters to Marie-Anne Houde, who was still in prison.

After Marie-Anne Houde's release from prison and subsequent death in 1936, Télesphore Gagnon subsequently remarried with a third wife in 1938, and had a son and daughter who died in infancy with her, and he subsequently lived a relatively obscure and peaceful life and away from public view, until he had died on 30 August 1961, at the age of 77.

After his release from prison, as mentioned before, Télesphore Gagnon spent most of the remainder of his life in obscurity. However, his name returned to the public spotlight in 1951 because of an upcoming film regarding the severe abuse and murder of ten-year-old Aurore Gagnon, La petite Aurore: l'enfant martyre. Télesphore Gagnon and his family attempted to stop the release of the film on the grounds that showing the film to the public would damage their reputation and put them to shame to the public, but, although they were able to halt the release of the film for around 6 months until April 1952, their attempts to completely stop the release of the film were unsuccessful in the end.

Aurore's eldest sister Marie-Jeanne Gagnon died in the city of Shawinigan on 31 October 1986, at the age of 79.

On 7 December 2015, the village of Fortierville recognized Aurore Gagnon as a historical figure (French: personnage historique).

== See also ==
- Cinderella effect
- Child murder
