= Deschaillons-sur-Saint-Laurent =

- Municipality
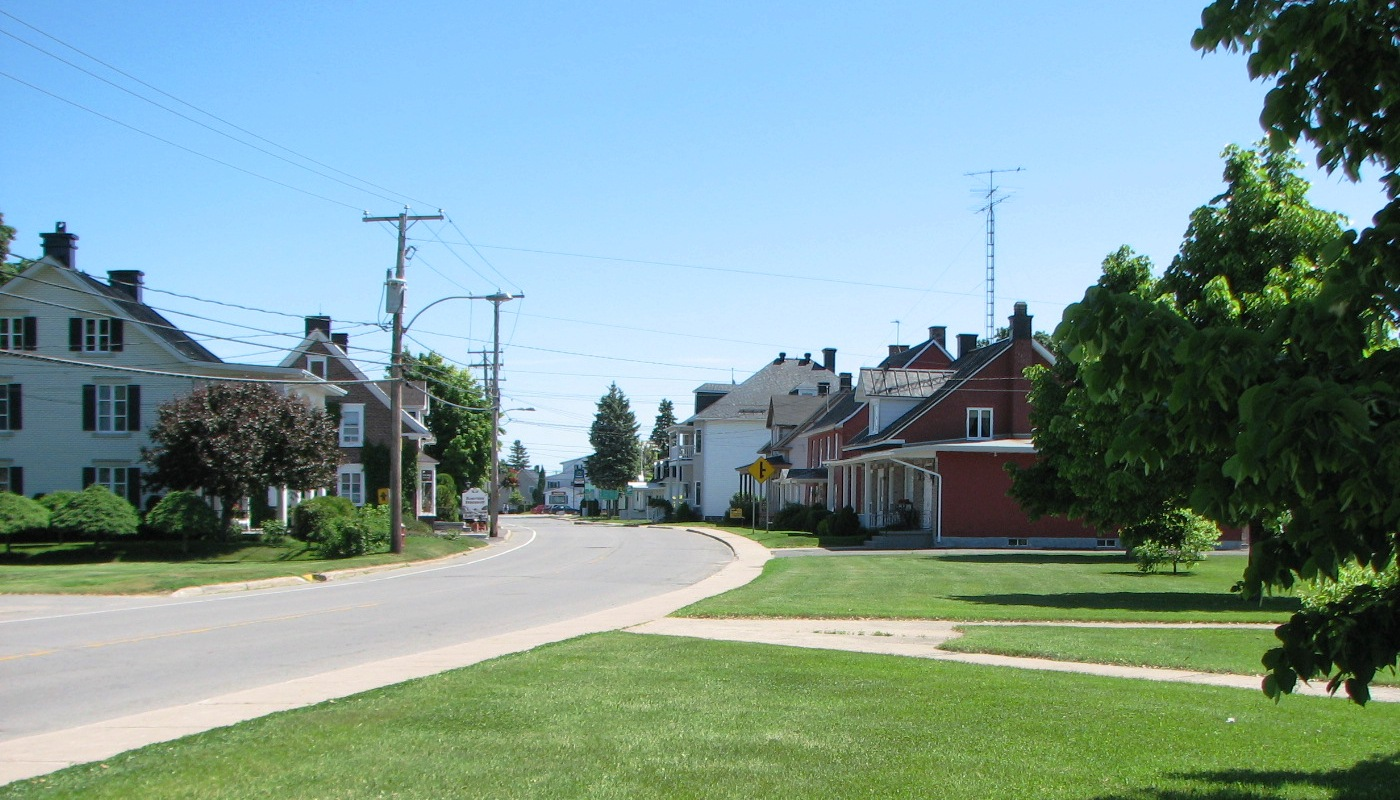
- Downtown Deschaillons-sur-Saint-Laurent

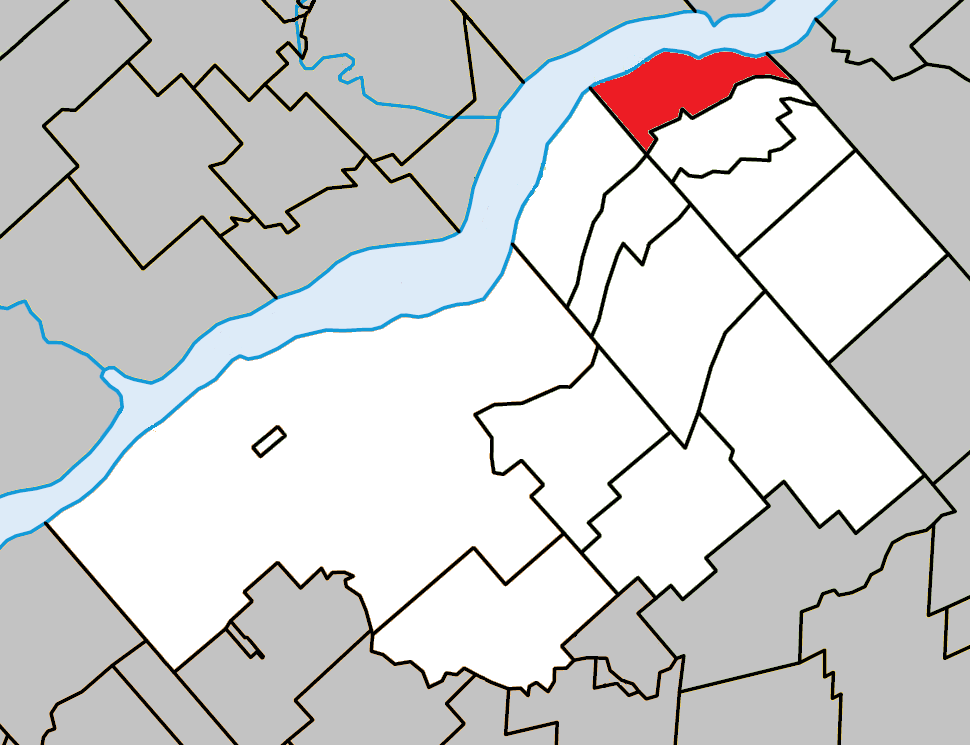
- Location within Bécancour RCM.

- Location in southern Quebec.
- Coordinates: 46°33′05″N 72°07′29″W
- Country: Canada
- Province: Quebec
- Region: Centre-du-Québec
- RCM: Bécancour
- Constituted: May 23, 1990

Government
  - Mayor: Christian Baril
  - Federal riding: Bécancour—Nicolet—Saurel—Alnôbak
  - Prov. riding: Nicolet-Bécancour

Area
  - Total: 51.59 km^{2} (19.92 sq mi)
  - Land: 36.51 km^{2} (14.10 sq mi)
  - Water: 15.26 km^{2} (5.89 sq mi) 29.6%

Population (2021)
  - Total: 906
  - Density: 24.8/km^{2} (64/sq mi)
  - Pop 2016-2021: ▼0.3%
  - Dwellings: 541
- Time zone: UTC−05:00 (EST)
  - Summer (DST): UTC−04:00 (EDT)
- Postal code(s): G0S 1G0
- Area code: 819
- Highways: R-132; R-265
- Website: www.deschaillons.ca

Deschaillons-sur-Saint-Laurent (French pronunciation: [deʃajɔ̃ syʁ sɛ̃ lɔʁɑ̃], lit. 'Deschaillons on St. Lawrence') is a province of Québec municipality in Canada that is part of the regional county municipalities of Bécancour and the administrative region of Centre-du-Québec.

Overlooking the St. Lawrence River from the south shore, along Route 132, the municipality has just under one thousand inhabitants. Deschaillons-sur-Saint-Laurent is 55 kilometres east of Trois-Rivières and 85 kilometres west of Quebec City.

The inhabitants of this municipality are referred to as “Deschaillonnais” and “Deschaillonnaises.”

Deschaillons owes its name to Lord Pierre de Saint-Ours, who obtained from the King of France this concession located on the banks of the St. Lawrence River. Pierre de Saint-Ours was initially Lord of L’Échaillon, in the former province of Dolphiné in France, and he gave to this new lordship located in New France this derived name which is Deschaillons, to commemorate the memory of its ancestors, as well as this first seigneurial possession on French soil.

== History ==
Deschaillons origins can be traced back to the seigneurial concession obtained on April 25, 1674, by the Knight Pierre de Saint-Ours. Louis de Buade, Count of Frontenac, then governor of the New France, granted him in the name of the King of France two leagues (8.9 km) along the St. Lawrence River, two leagues deep in the said lands.

During the first years, the Lord of Saint-Ours granted land for clearing and agricultural exploitation to around twenty settlers, some of whom had appellations still present in the village as surnames (Auger, Barabé, Beaudet, Mailhot, Tousignant...).

Pierre de Saint-Ours was previously named lord of estates now located in Saint-Ours (1668) and L'Assomption (1672). Everything indicates that he was more attached to these seigneuries, located close to each other, near Montreal.

The seigneury of Deschaillons remained within the descendants of the Saint-Ours until the territory was constituted as a municipality on May 12, 1835. The village was subsequently detached from the parish of Deschaillons on July 22, 1939, taking the name Deschaillons-sur-Saint-Laurent. The regrouping, on May 23, 1990, of the municipalities of Deschaillons and Deschaillons-sur-Saint-Laurent under the name of the latter, constituted a swing of the pendulum.

== Geography ==
Deschaillons-sur-Saint-Laurent is located in the St. Lawrence Lowlands. Its topography is mainly flat and overlooks the river at an average height of 40 meters... hence the name Deschaillons-sur-Saint-Laurent (which translated means above the St-Lawrence River)

The village has a total area of 36.33 km^{2} and is bordered by the municipalities of Parisville to the south, Saint-Pierre-les-Becquets to the west, Leclercville to the east, and the St. Lawrence River North Coast.

Geologically, its basement rocks date from the Ordovician period. It mainly comprises gray, silty and micaceous shale, containing interbeds of fine-grained sandstone, siltstone and sandy limestone.

Deschaillons-sur-Saint-Laurent is located downstream of the watershed of the Rivière du Chêne (Little Oak River). The river mouth is at the eastern limit of its borders.

== Demographics ==
In the 2021 Census of Population conducted by Statistics Canada, Deschaillons-sur-Saint-Laurent had a population of 906 living in 406 of its 541 total private dwellings, a change of −0.3% from its 2016 population of 909. With a land area of 36.51 km^{2} (14.10 sq mi), it had a population density of 24.8/km^{2} (64.3/sq mi) in 2021.

Population
1991	1996	2001	2006	2011	2016	2021
1072	1060	1061	1009	954	909	906

The average age of the population in 2021 was 53.1 years.

== Economy ==
During the first three centuries, the development of agriculture, livestock breeding, navigation and, later, the establishment of several brickworks made possible thanks to the clayey soil along the banks of the river constituted the main economic activities of Deschaillons-sur-Saint-Laurent.

Agriculture and dairy production have been important activities, although the number of farms has greatly decreased in recent decades. While the amount of territory used for farming has remained stable, it belongs to an increasingly small number of family farms.

For more than a century, brick manufacturing occupied an important place in the economy of Deschaillons. There were twenty-one brickworks in 1915, which sold their production by boat on markets as far away as Quebec City. However, by the 1980s, the last factory had closed its doors.

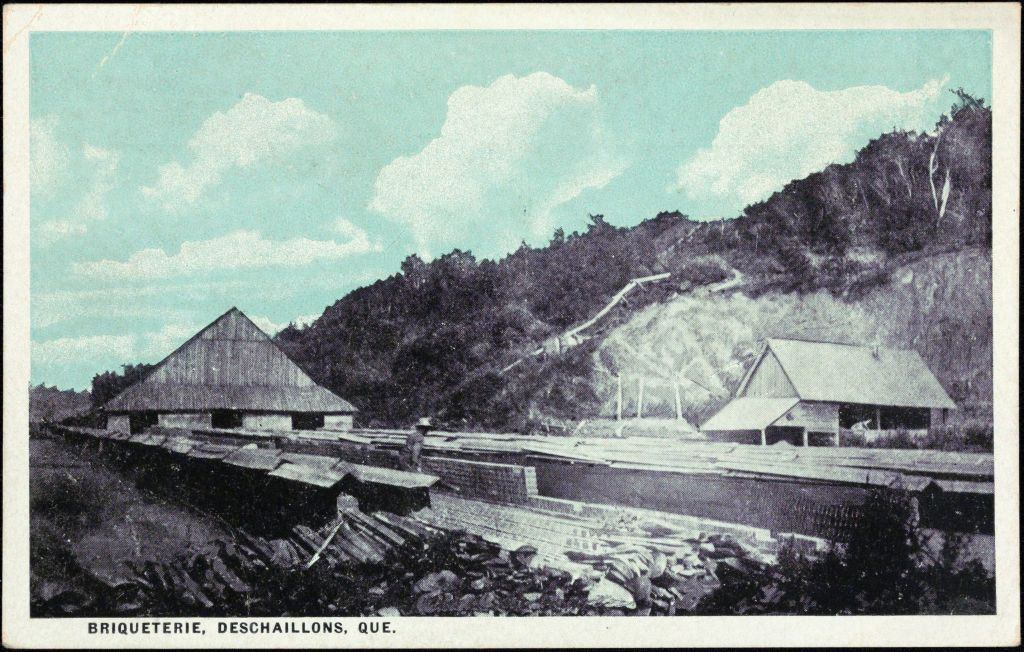
Former brickworks in Deschaillons-sur-Saint-Laurent

Today, the majority of employment opportunities are in the service sector. Deschaillons has become a service hub in the sub-region, mainly in the distribution of shoes and clothing, food, veterinary services, beauty and hairdressing treatments, etc.

Due to its unusual geographical positioning (a riverside village with land majestically overlooking the St. Lawrence River), Deschaillons is a popular vacation spot that welcomes a few hundred additional residents every summer, including thanks to the abundance of seasonal chalets, a large campsite (Cap à la Roche), and a lodge/chalets estate (Le Domaine d'Eschaillons).

== Attractions ==
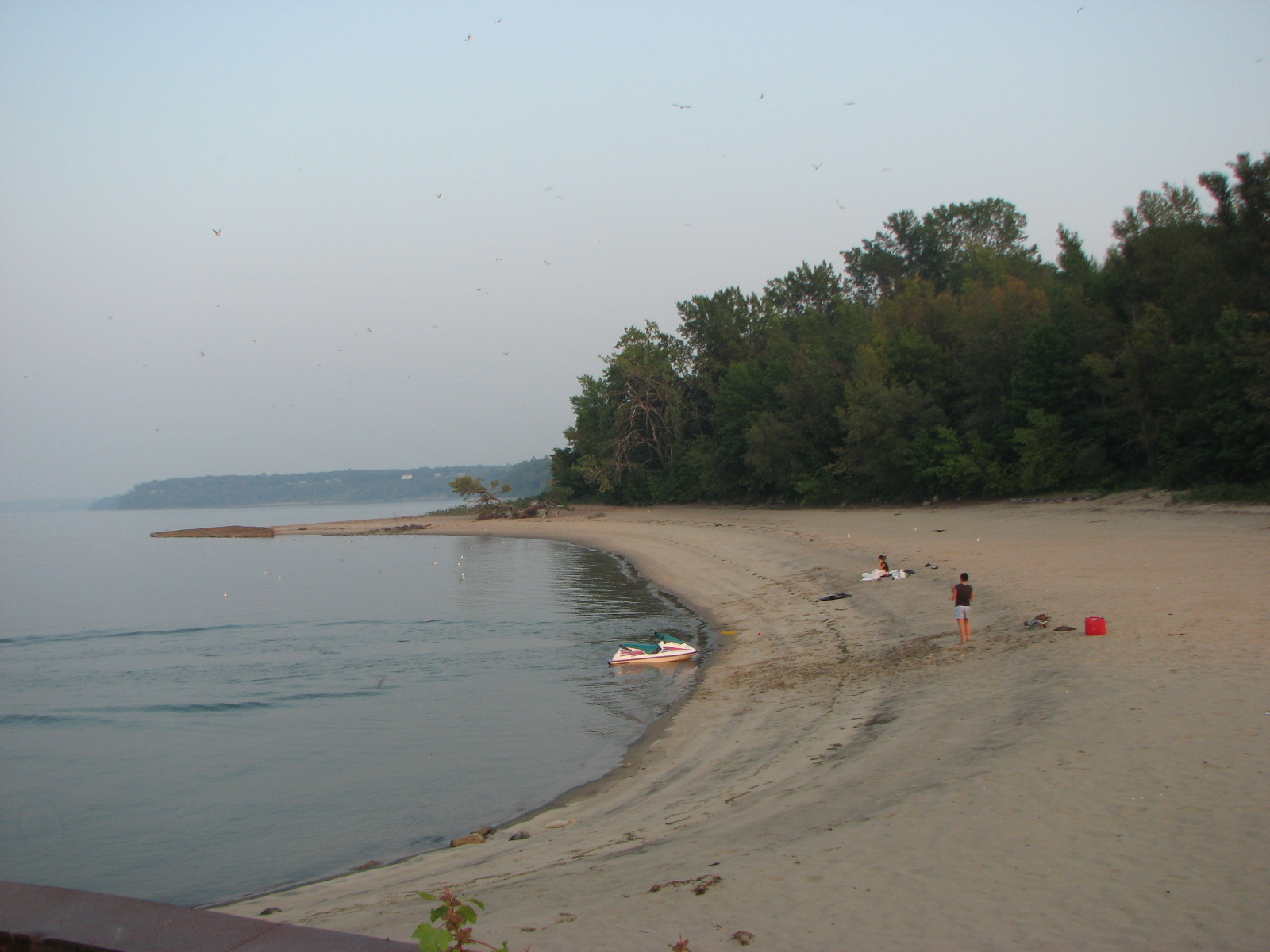
Deschaillons-sur-Saint-Laurent Beach

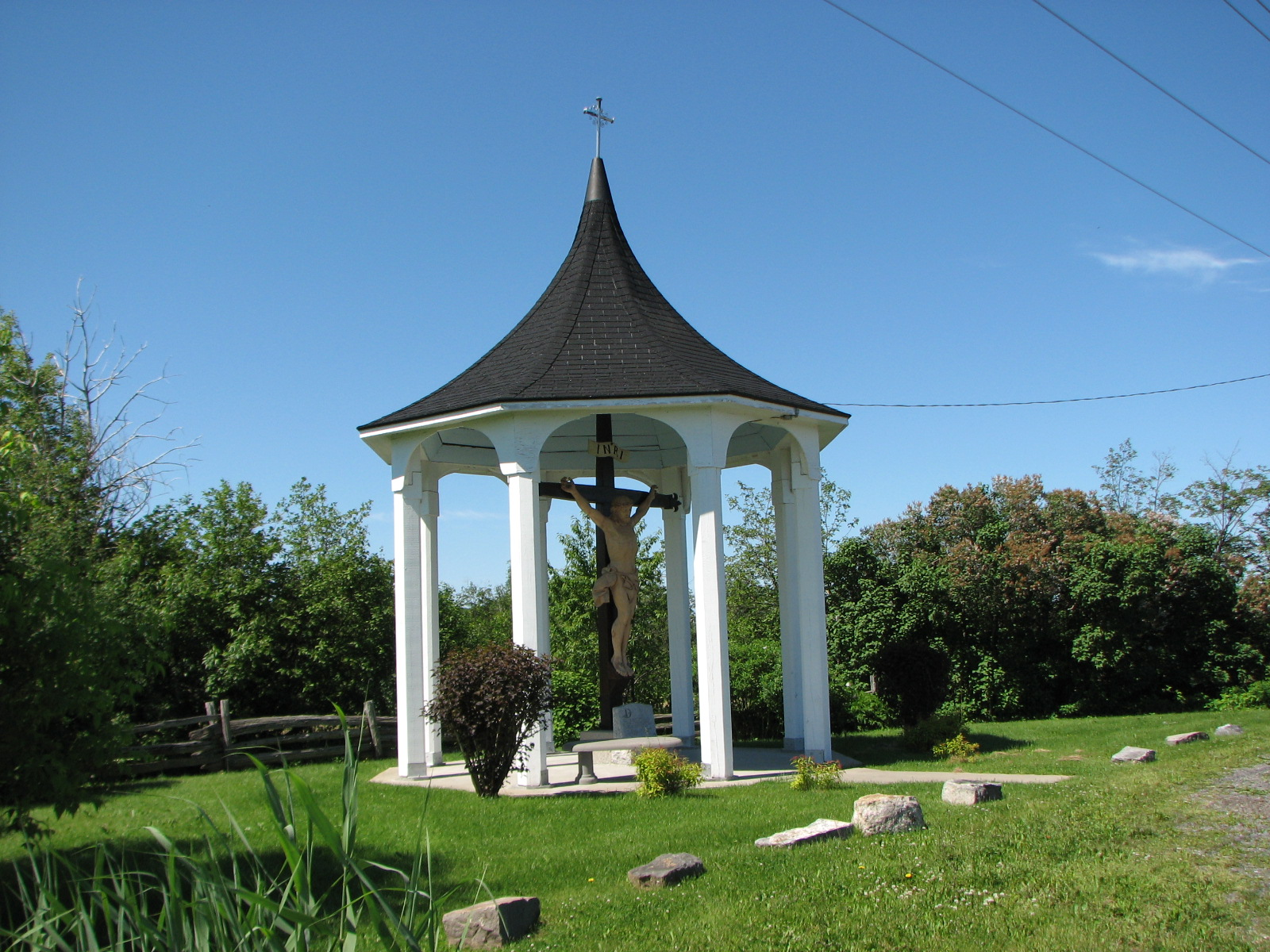
Calvary in Deschaillons-sur-Saint-Laurent

- Sandy Beach (one of the largest and most beautiful beaches on the south shore of the St. Lawrence River, between Montreal and Quebec City)
- La Roche à Mailhot
- Road rest stop, maritime lighthouse and viewpoint (same location)
- Hiking, cross-country skiing and snowshoeing trails
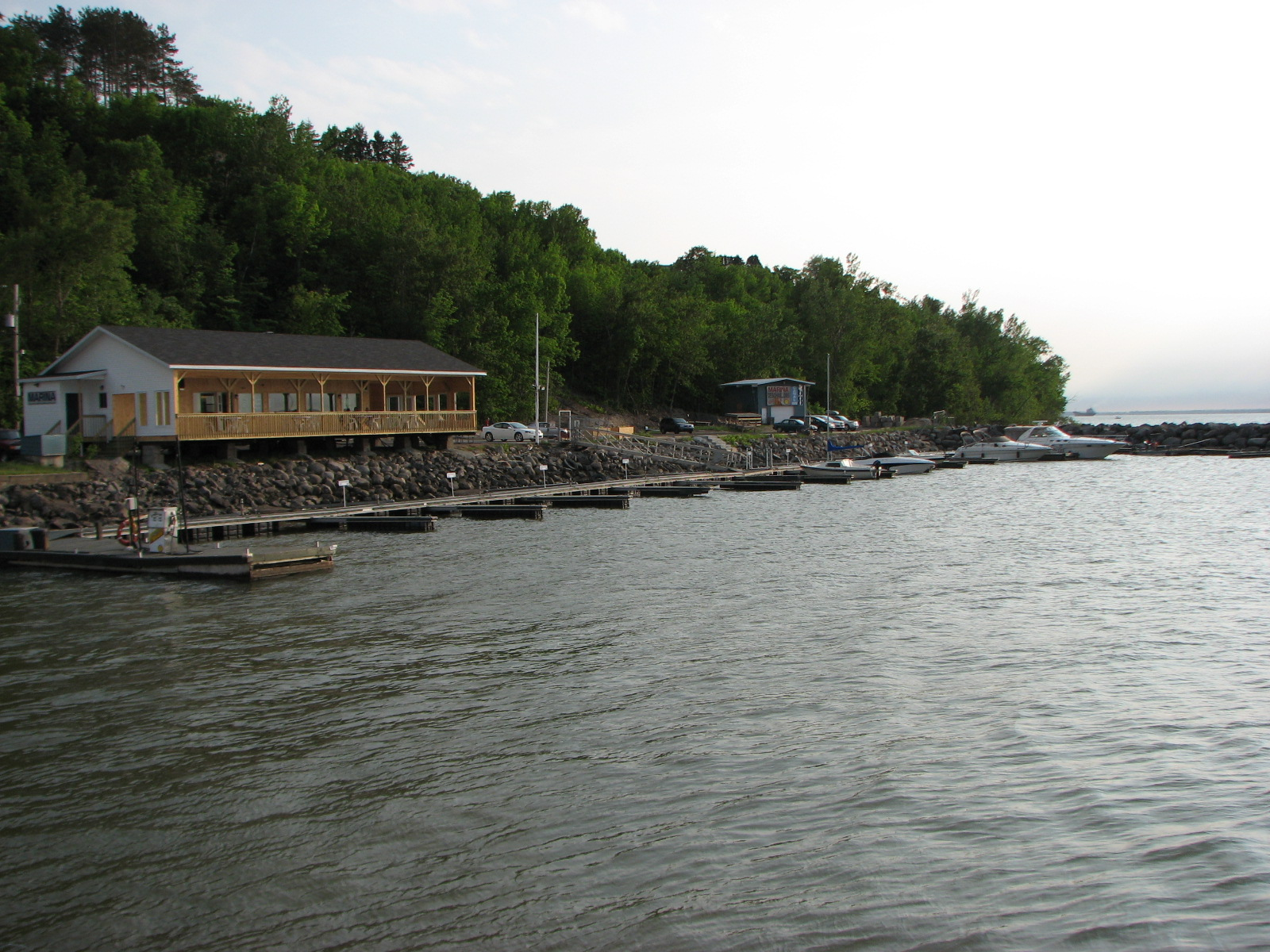
  Marina in Deschaillons-sur-Saint-Laurent
- Cheese factory (Fromagerie Deschaillons)
- Public market for regional farmers and crafts people (Saturdays during the summer season)
- Library
- Marina (D’Eschaillons Nautical Club)
- Fitness trail
- Soccer and ball field
- Ice rink (soon to be covered)
- Tennis and pickleball courts, pétanque court
- Pump track

=== La roche à Mailhot ===
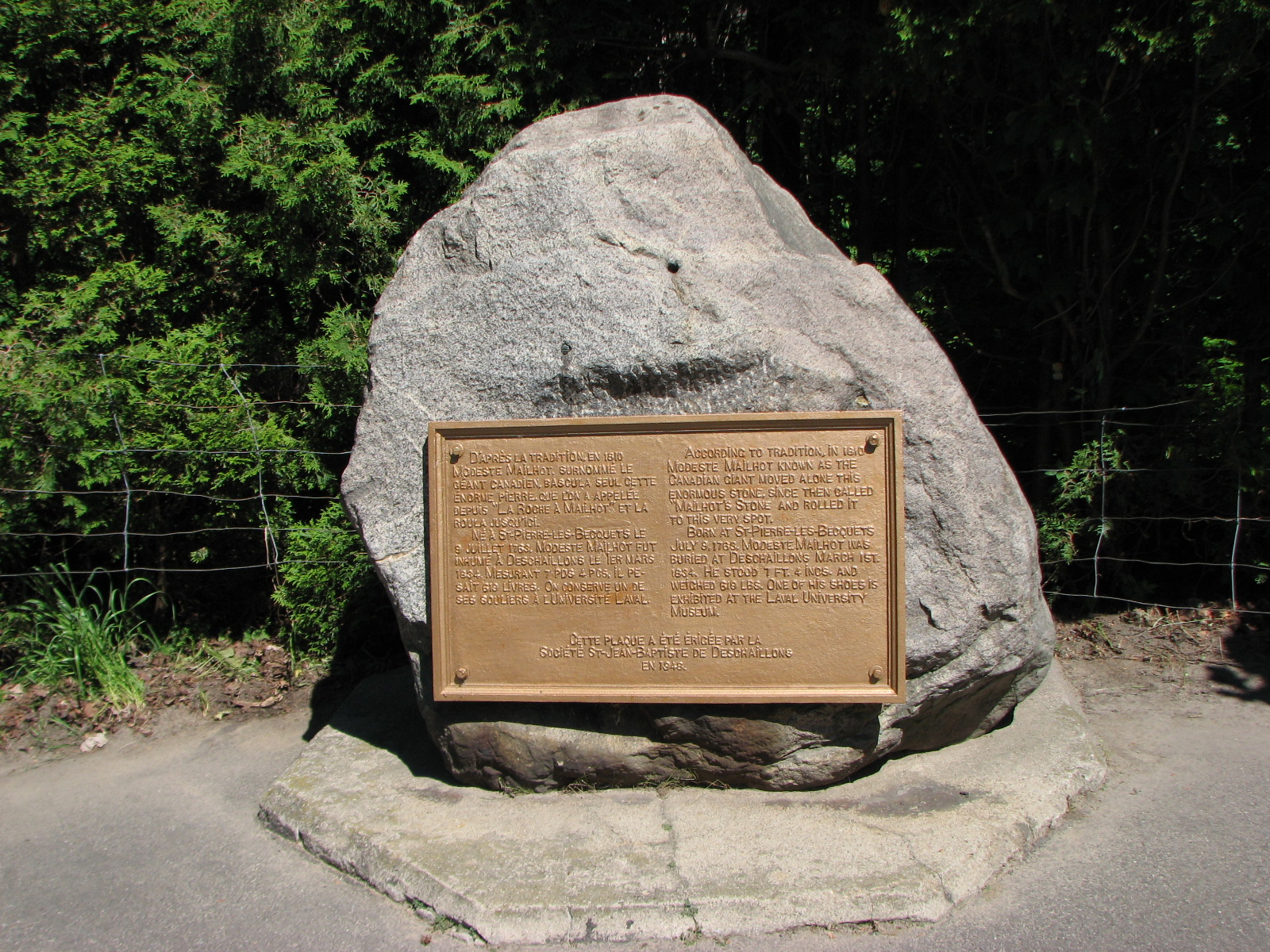
The rock Modeste Mailhot would have moved.

The legend recounts that around 1810 during the construction of the main road to Deschaillons-sur-Saint-Laurent (now Route 132), a group of workers tried to move a huge rock approximately 6 feet (2 meters) high by 3 feet (1.5 meters) wide. The group decided to take their meal break and come back with horses to make their work easier. In the meantime, the giant of Deschaillons, Modeste Mailhot, who was seven feet and four inches (2.23 m) in height and weighed no less than 619 pounds (281 kilos), found himself alone with the rock and rolled it several feet out of the way. A living legend was born into the history of Deschaillons. This stone is still found along the Marie-Victorin road, 3.8 km east of the village centre, with a plaque which describes the feat which earned this colossus of Deschaillons the titles of "Giant Canadian" or "Modeste Giant". This commemorative plaque, initially made of copper, has been stolen three times over the past ten years.

== Infrastructure ==
Primary school, “Métro” food market, convenience (dépanneur) store/gasoline store, cheese factory, pharmacy, veterinary clinic, municipal multi-functional centre (former church), (former) presbytery, post office, car dealership, mechanics and auto body shops, hair salons, restaurants, maritime lighthouse, savings and credit union bank, artisanal production cooperative, four (4) public charging terminals for electric vehicles (EVs), ecocentre, fire station and first responders.

== Government ==
Elections are held every four years for the mayor and the six local councillors.

NB: Since 2005, elections have been held simultaneously in all municipalities in the province of Quebec.

== Notable people ==
Pamphile Le May, novelist, poet, storyteller, librarian and lawyer, lived the last years of his life in Deschaillons, from 1912 until his death on June 11, 1918. He was a native of Lotbinière.

== See also ==
- List of municipalities in Quebec

== Photo Gallery ==
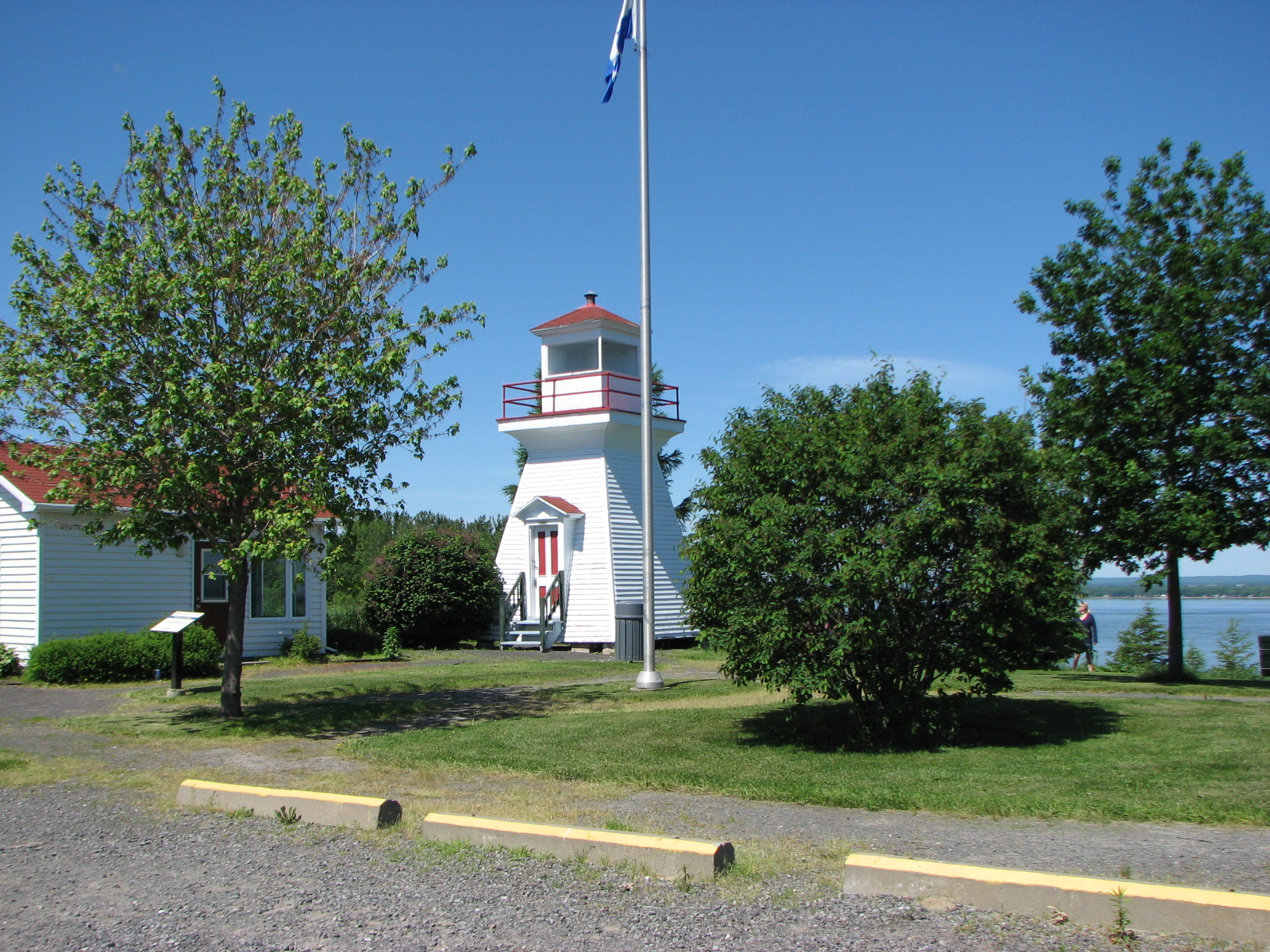
Lighthouse at the rest stop at the western entrance to the village

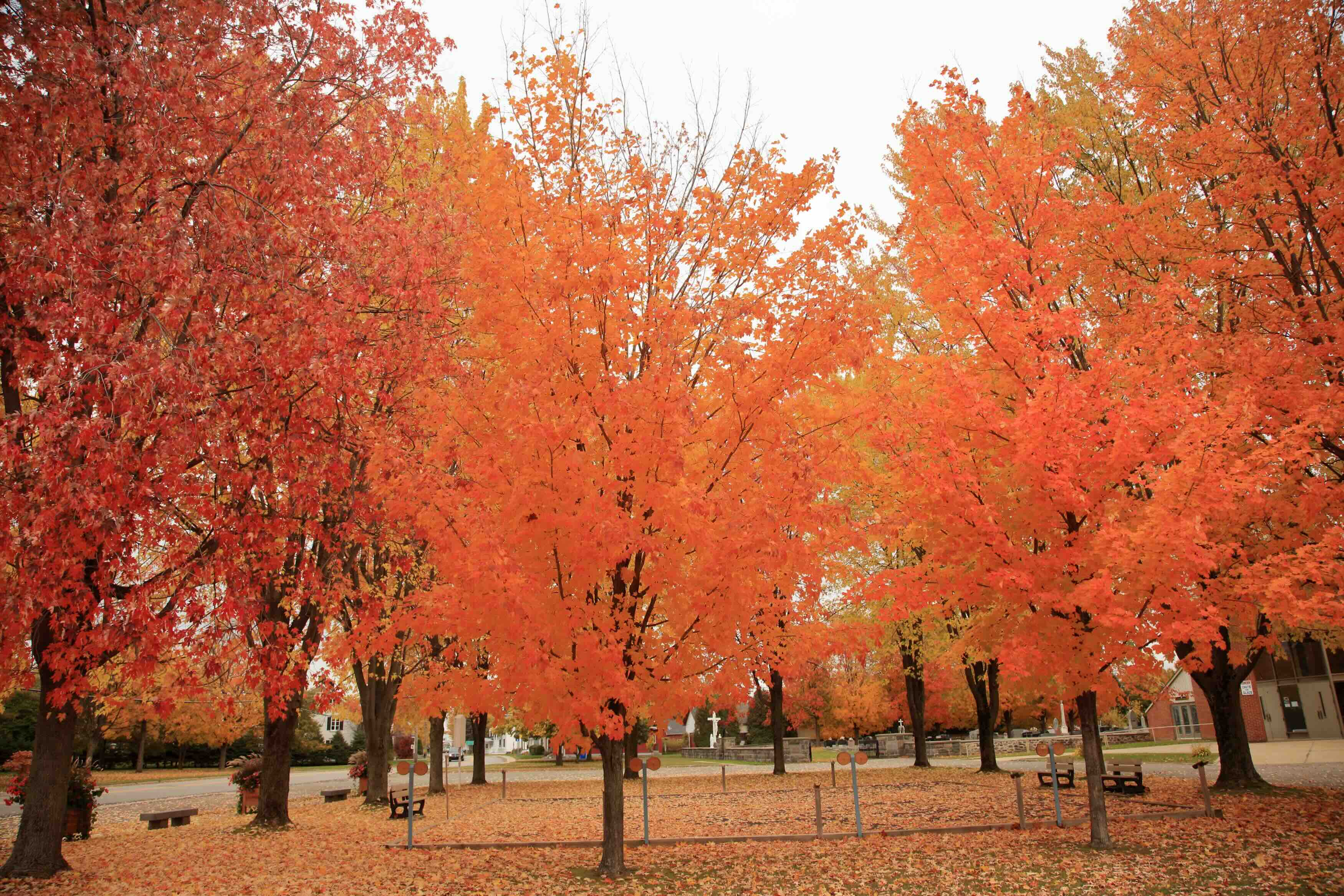
Trees in the municipal park in the village center

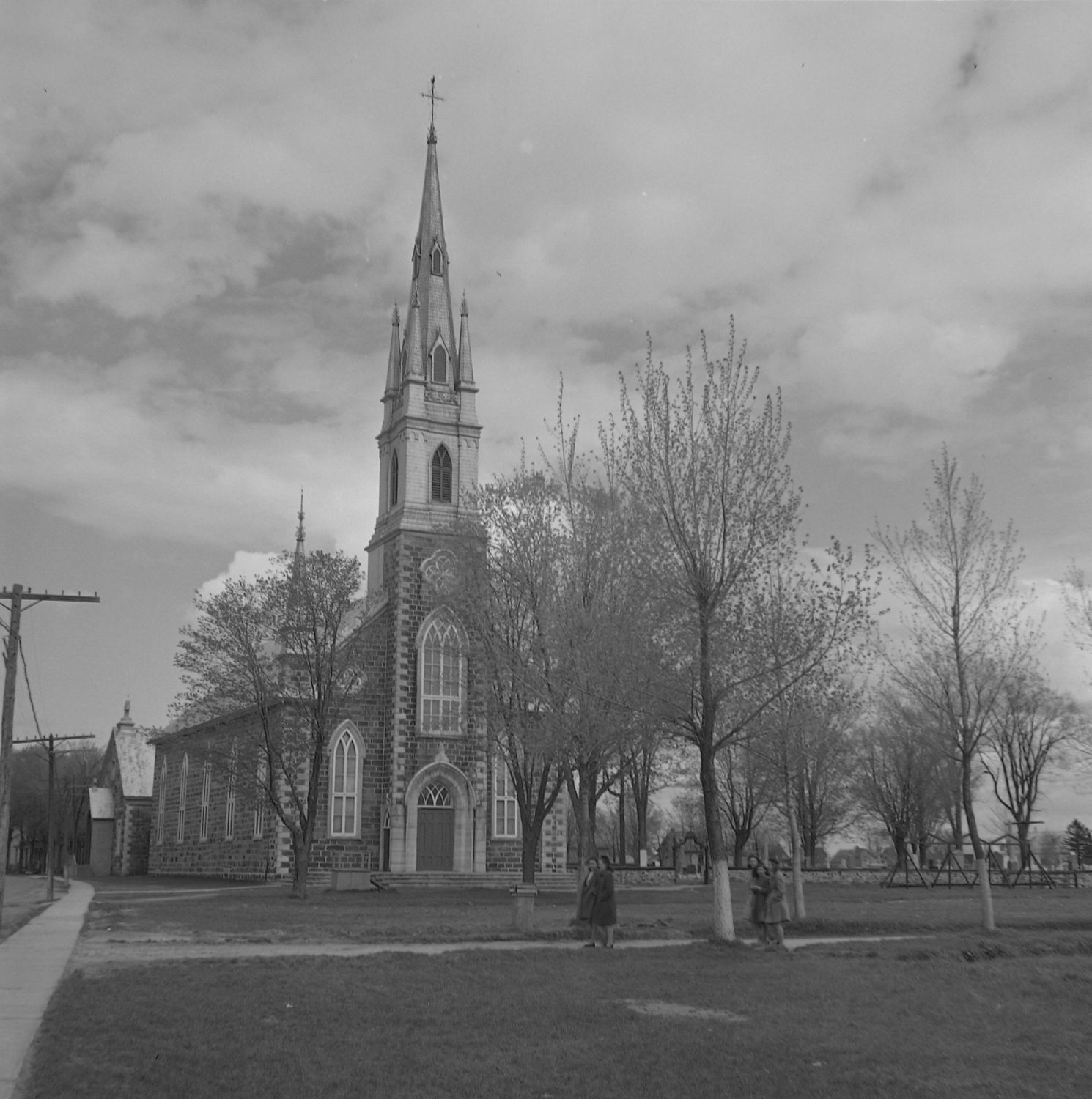
Deschaillons-sur-Saint-Laurent church (burnt down in 1982)

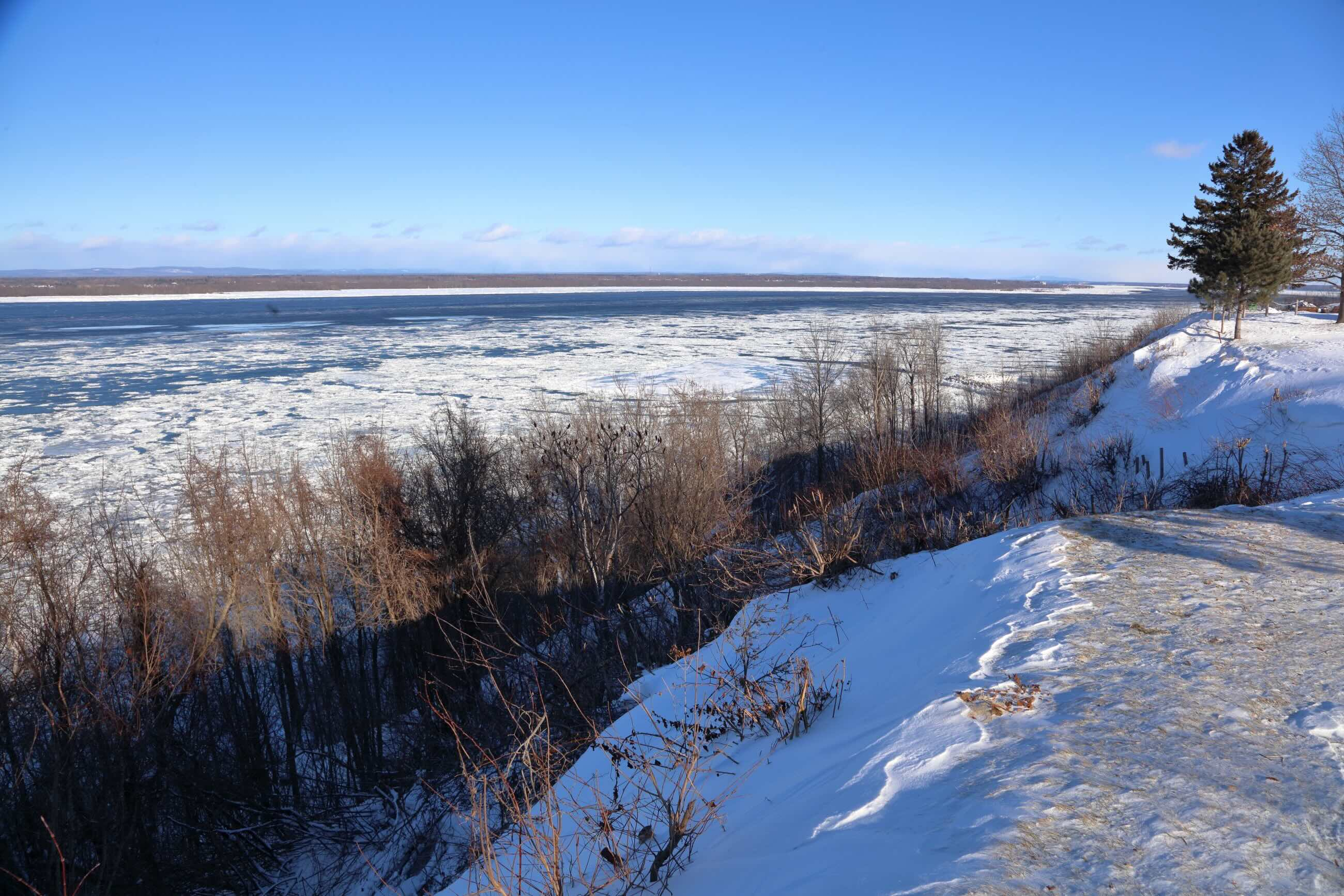
Winter view of the St. Lawrence River from the village

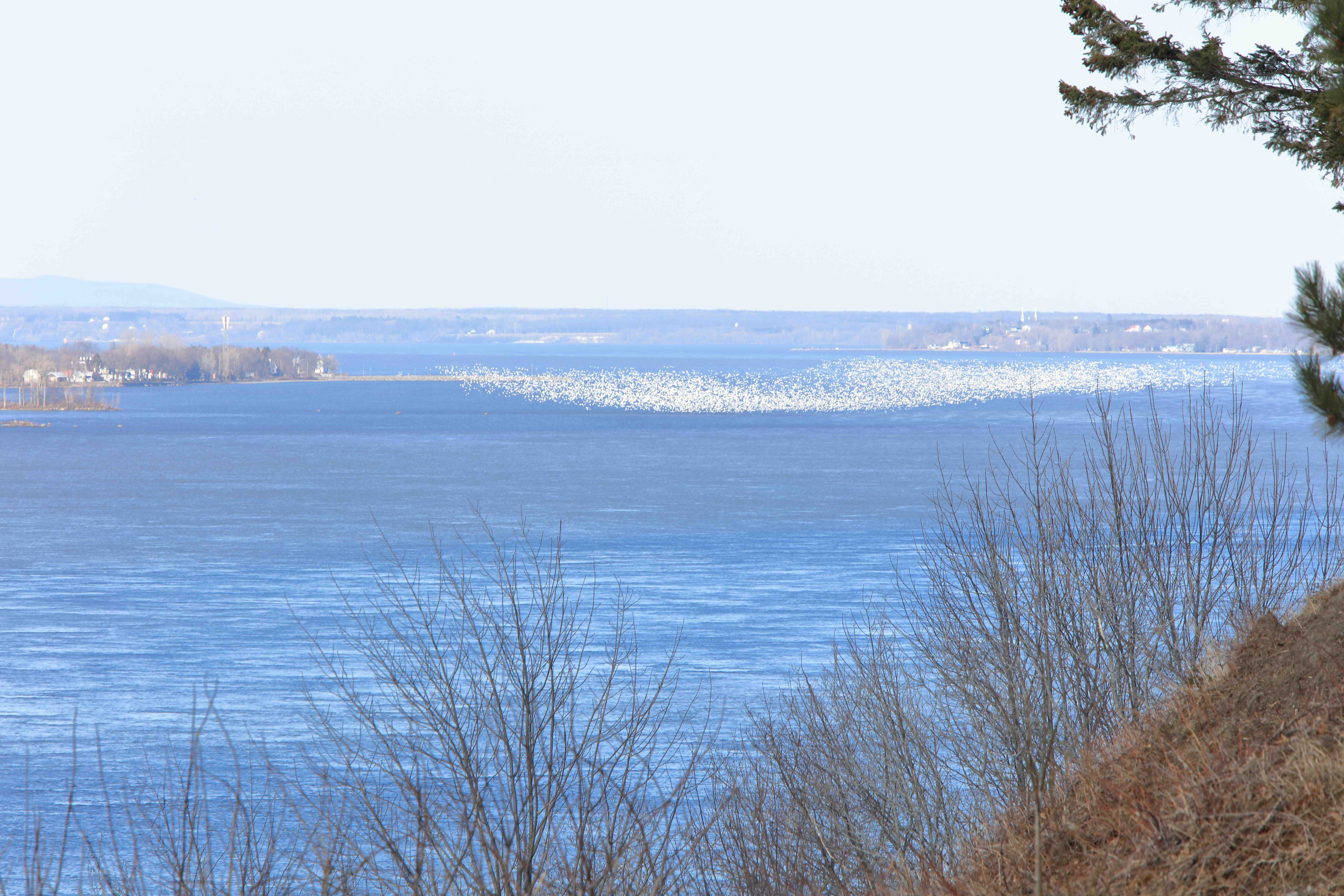
View of snow geese on the river from the village

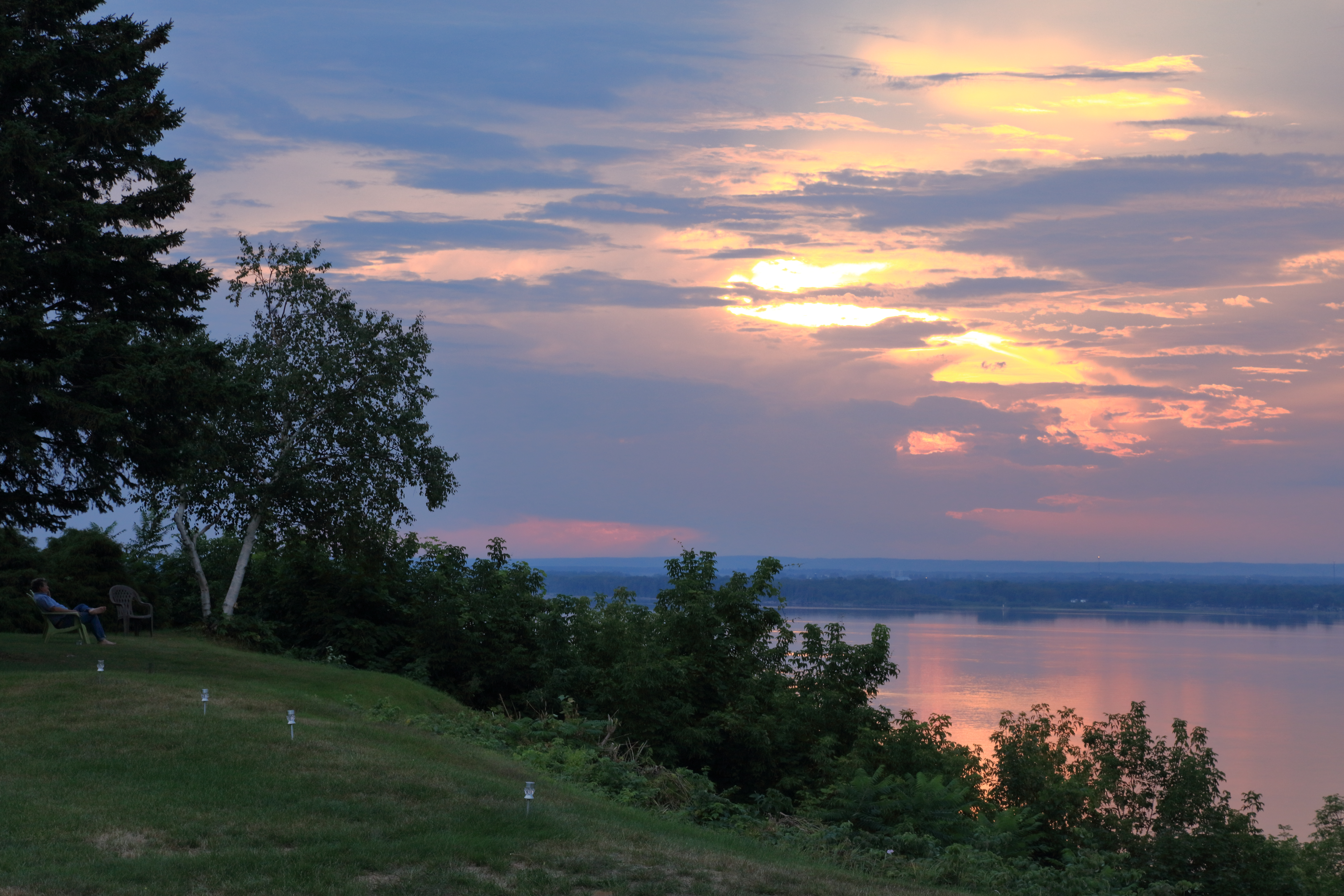
View of the St. Lawrence River from the village

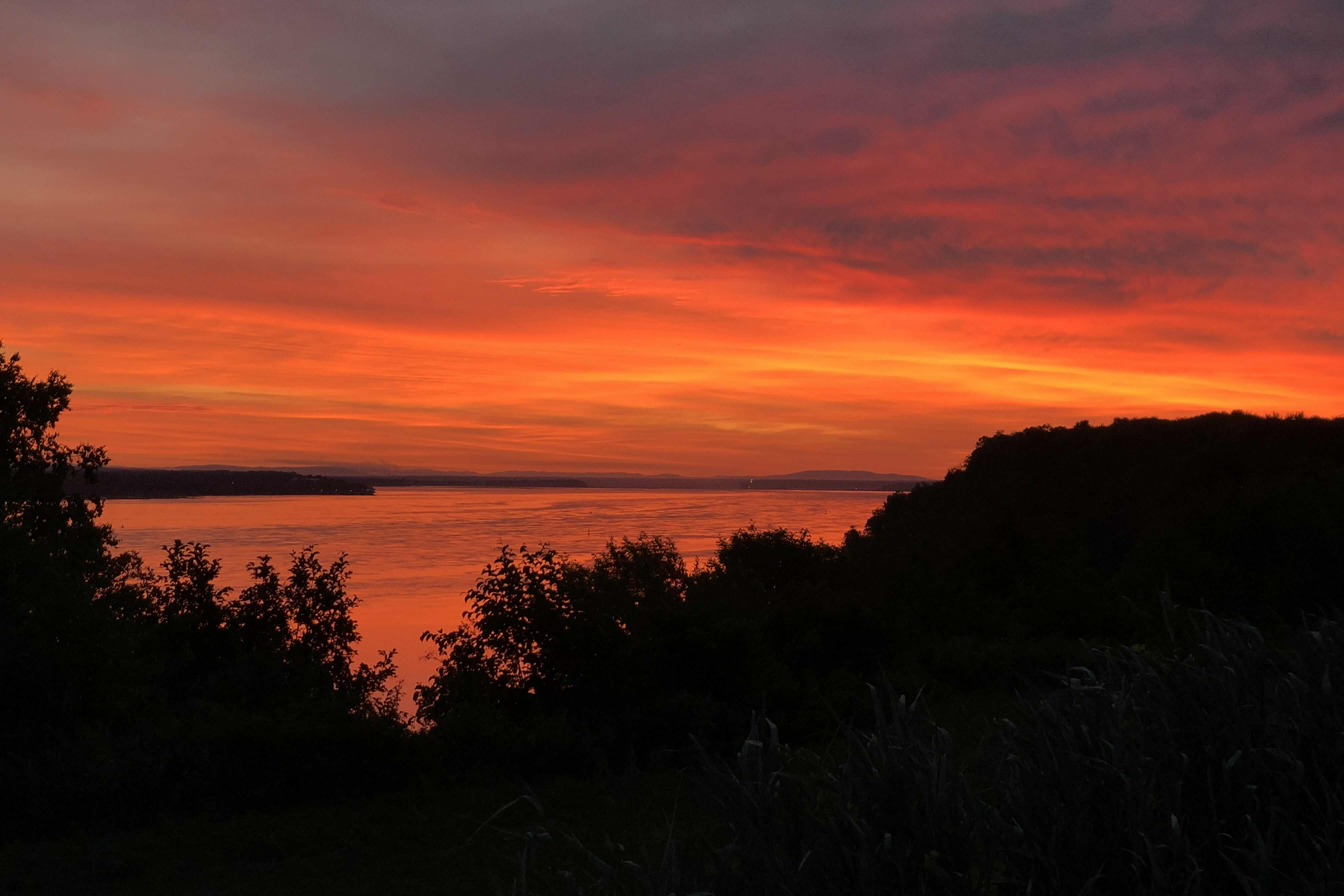
Sunrise over the St. Lawrence River

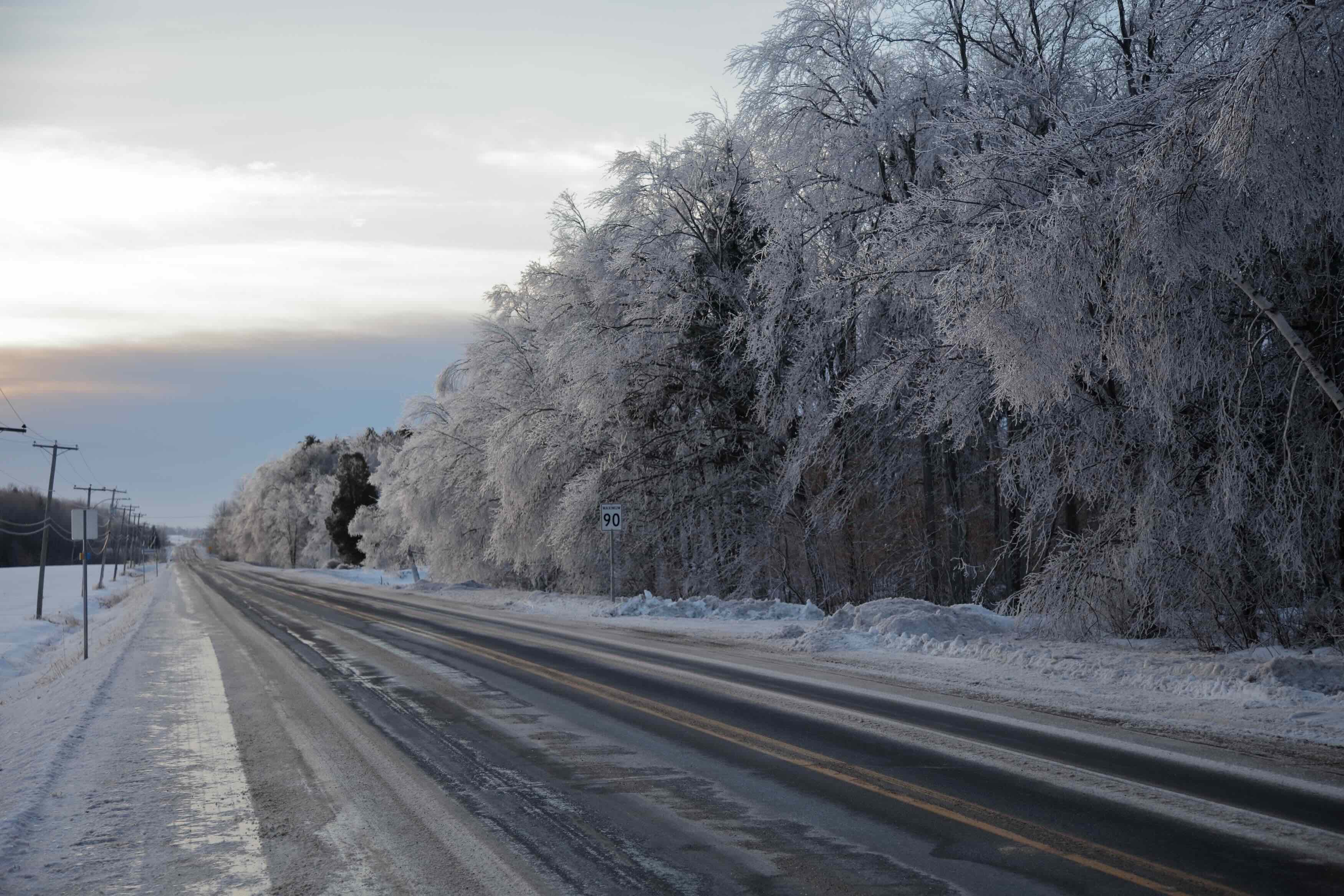
Frost on Route 265 in Deschaillons-sur-Saint-Laurent

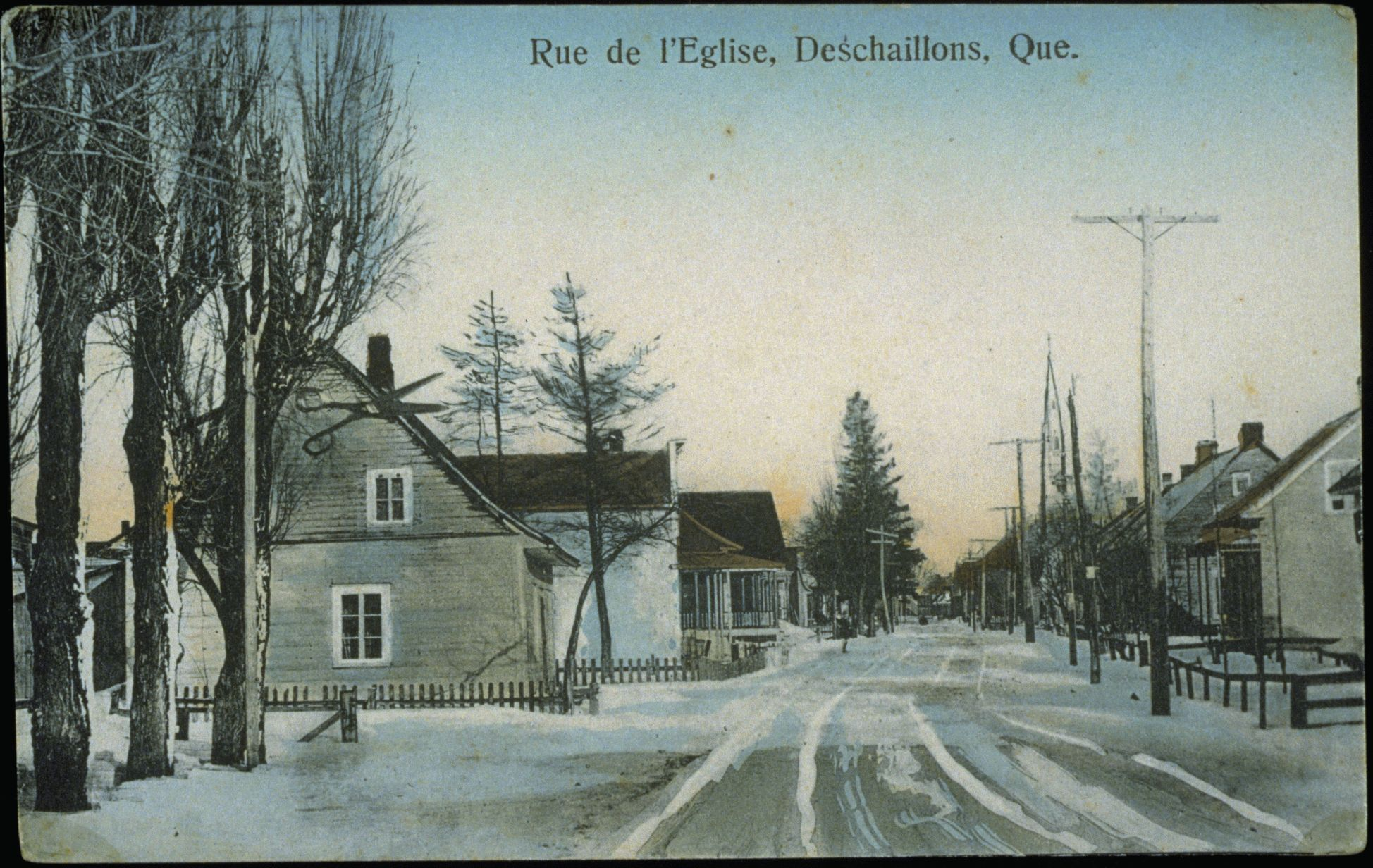
Main street, Deschaillons-sur-Saint-Laurent (early 20th century)

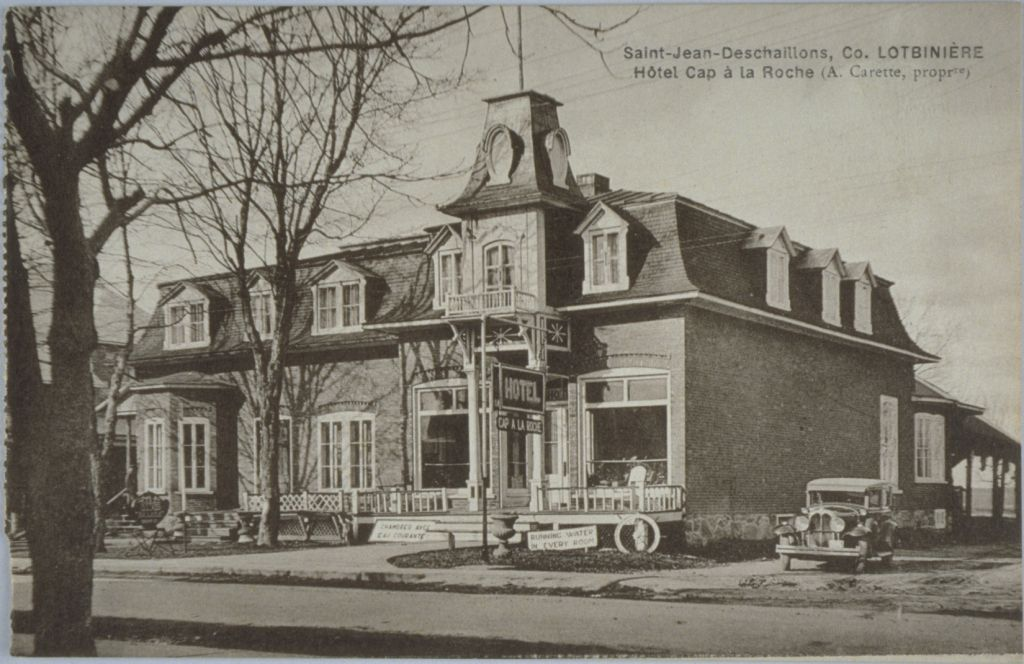
Hotel Cap à la Roche (Deschaillons-sur-Saint-Laurent)
