= Auguste de Creuse =

French portrait painter

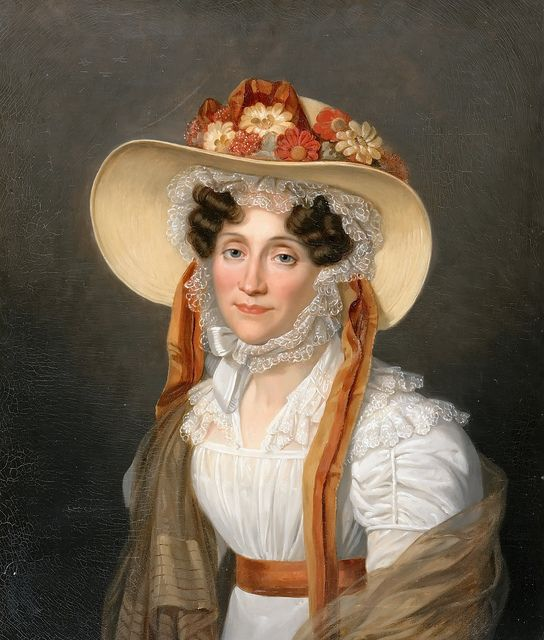
Princess Adélaïde of Orléans, 1838

Auguste de Creuse (1806–1839) was a French portrait painter. He was born at Montrond (Doubs) and died in Paris. He was a pupil of Gros, and painted many of the historical portraits which are at Versailles.
