= Sainte-Sophie-de-Lévrard =

- Parish municipality
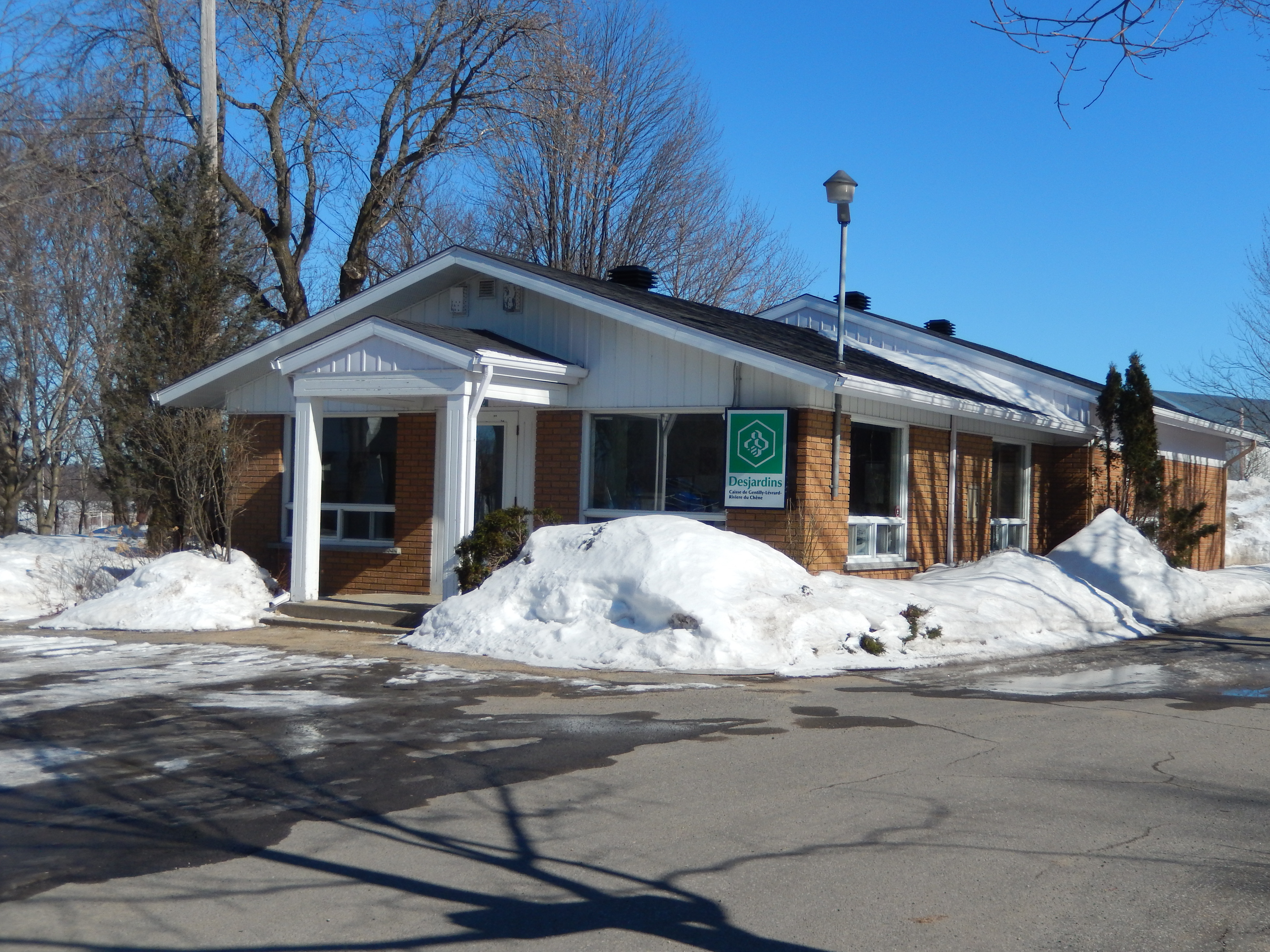

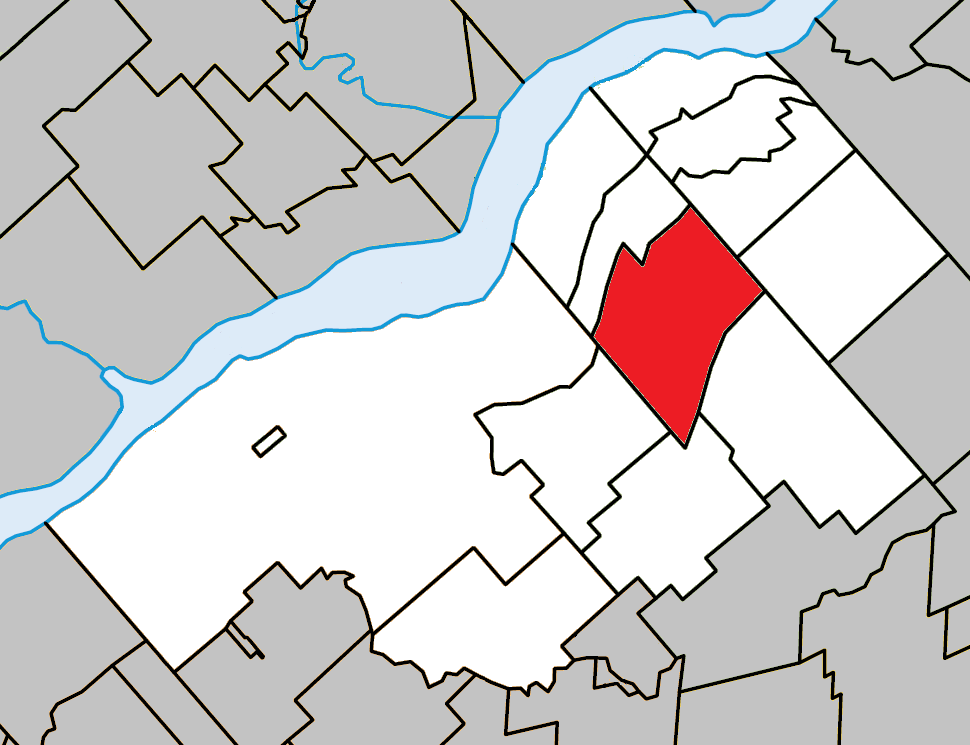
- Location within Bécancour RCM

- Location in southern Quebec
- Coordinates: 46°26′N 72°07′W
- Country: Canada
- Province: Quebec
- Region: Centre-du-Québec
- RCM: Bécancour
- Constituted: April 23, 1875

Government
  - Mayor: Sébastien Demers
  - Federal riding: Bécancour—Nicolet—Saurel—Alnôbak
  - Prov. riding: Nicolet-Bécancour

Area
  - Total: 82.10 km^{2} (31.70 sq mi)
  - Land: 83.99 km^{2} (32.43 sq mi)
- There is an apparent contradiction between two authoritative sources

Population (2011)
  - Total: 733
  - Density: 8.7/km^{2} (23/sq mi)
  - Pop 2006-2011: ▼5.4%
  - Dwellings: 404
- Time zone: UTC−5 (EST)
  - Summer (DST): UTC−4 (EDT)
- Postal code(s): G0X 3C0
- Area code: 819
- Highways: R-218; R-226

Sainte-Sophie-de-Lévrard (French pronunciation: [sɛ̃t sɔfi də levʁaʁ]) is a parish municipality in the Centre-du-Québec region of the province of Quebec in Canada.

== Demographics ==
In the 2021 Census of Population conducted by Statistics Canada, Sainte-Sophie-de-Lévrard had a population of 704 living in 357 of its 415 total private dwellings, a change of −3.4% from its 2016 population of 729. With a land area of 84.05 km^{2} (32.45 sq mi), it had a population density of 8.4/km^{2} (21.7/sq mi) in 2021.

== See also ==
- List of parish municipalities in Quebec
