= Bécancour Regional County Municipality =

Bécancour
- Regional county municipality
- Location in province of Quebec.
- Coordinates: 46°19′N 72°11′W
- Country: Canada
- Province: Quebec
- Region: Centre-du-Québec
- Effective: January 1, 1982
- County seat: Bécancour

Government
  - Type: Prefecture
  - Prefect: Poste vacant

Area
  - Total: 1,231.30 km^{2} (475.41 sq mi)
  - Land: 1,144.67 km^{2} (441.96 sq mi)

Population (2016)
  - Total: 20,404
  - Density: 17.8/km^{2} (46/sq mi)
  - Change 2011-2016: ▲1.6%
  - Dwellings: 9,947
- Time zone: UTC−5 (EST)
  - Summer (DST): UTC−4 (EDT)
- Area code: 819

Bécancour (French pronunciation: [bekɑ̃kuʁ]) is a regional county municipality in the Centre-du-Québec region of Quebec, Canada. Its seat is Bécancour.

== Subdivisions ==
There are 12 subdivisions and one native reserve within the RCM:

Cities & Towns (1)

- Bécancour

Municipalities (8)

- Deschaillons-sur-Saint-Laurent
- Fortierville
- Lemieux
- Manseau
- Saint-Pierre-les-Becquets
- Saint-Sylvère
- Sainte-Françoise
- Sainte-Marie-de-Blandford

Parishes (3)

- Parisville
- Sainte-Cécile-de-Lévrard
- Sainte-Sophie-de-Lévrard

Native Reserves (1)
(not associated with RCM)

- Wôlinak

== Demographics ==
Mother tongue from 2016 Canadian Census

Language	Population	Pct (%)
French only	19,550	97.9%
English only	155	0.8%
Both English and French	65	0.3%
Other languages	205	1.0%

== Transportation ==
=== Access Routes ===
Highways and numbered routes that run through the municipality, including external routes that start or finish at the county border:

- Autoroutes
  - A-20 (TCH)
  - A-30
  - A-55
- Principal Highways
  - R-132
- Secondary Highways
  - R-218
  - R-226
  - R-261
  - R-263
  - R-265
- External Routes
  - None

== See also ==
- List of regional county municipalities and equivalent territories in Quebec
