= Sainte-Françoise, Centre-du-Québec =

Sainte-Françoise
- Municipality

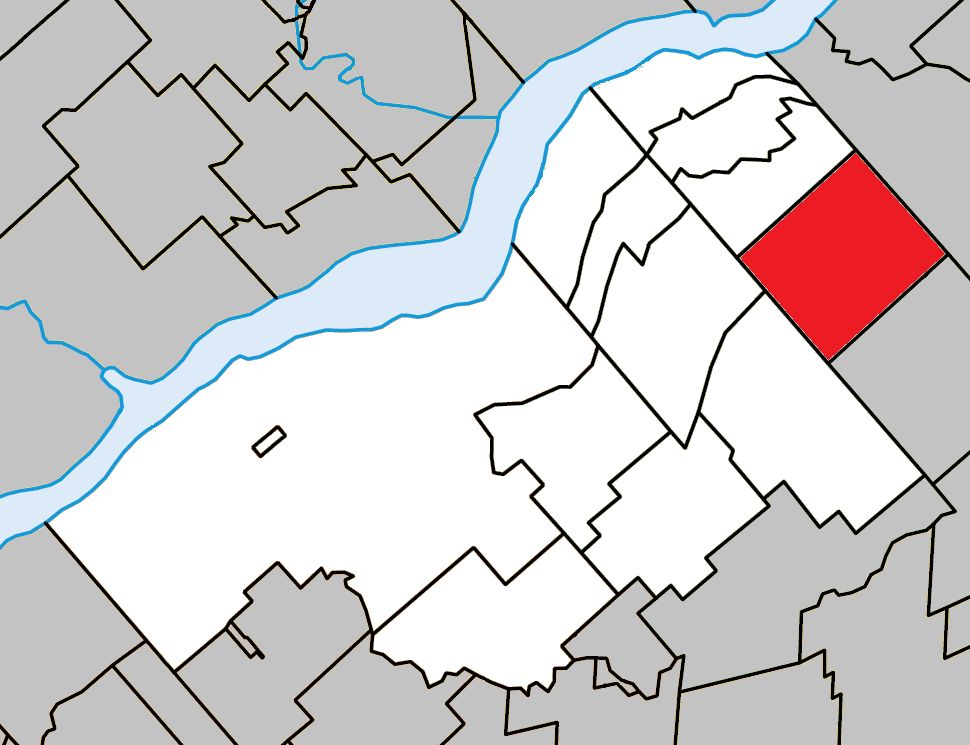
- Location within Bécancour RCM.

- Location in southern Quebec.
- Coordinates: 46°27′N 71°59′W
- Country: Canada
- Province: Quebec
- Region: Centre-du-Québec
- RCM: Bécancour
- Constituted: January 1, 1947

Government
  - Mayor: Mario Lyonnais
  - Federal riding: Bécancour—Nicolet—Saurel—Alnôbak
  - Prov. riding: Nicolet-Bécancour

Area
  - Total: 87.30 km^{2} (33.71 sq mi)
  - Land: 87.02 km^{2} (33.60 sq mi)

Population (2021)
  - Total: 467
  - Density: 5.4/km^{2} (14/sq mi)
  - Pop 2016-2021: ▲4.0%
  - Dwellings: 238
- Time zone: UTC−5 (EST)
  - Summer (DST): UTC−4 (EDT)
- Postal code(s): G0S 2N0
- Area code: 819
- Highways: R-265
- Website: www.mrcbecancour.qc.ca/municipalites/sainte-francoise

Sainte-Françoise (French pronunciation: [sɛ̃t fʁɑ̃swaz]) is a municipality in the Centre-du-Québec region of the province of Quebec in Canada.
