= Quebec Route 265 =

Highway in Quebec, Canada

Route 265

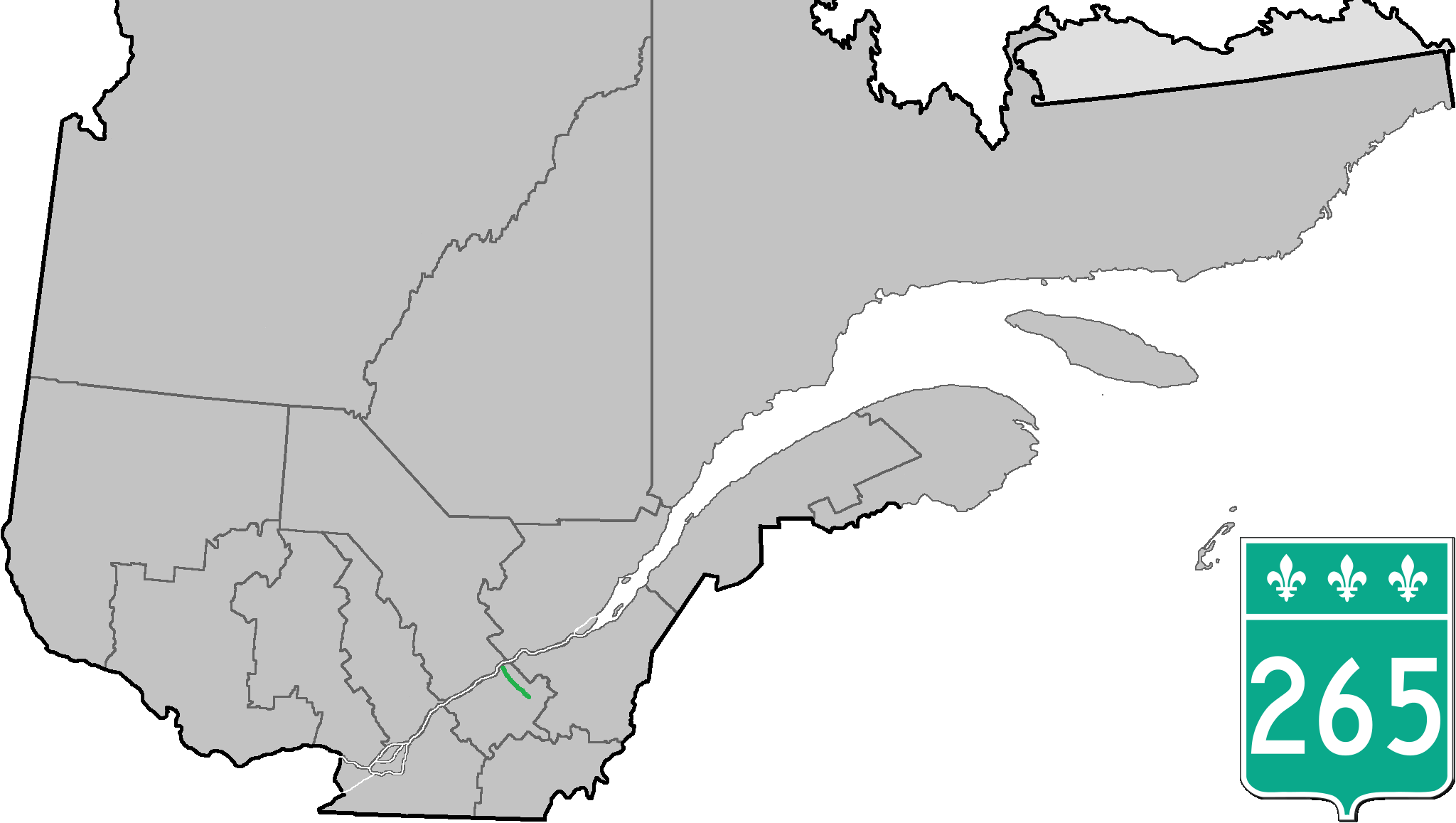

Route information
- Length: 49 km (30 mi)

Major junctions
- South end: R-116 near Plessisville
- A-20 (TCH) in Villeroy
- North end: R-132 near Deschaillons-sur-Saint-Laurent

Location
- Country: Canada
- Province: Quebec
- Major cities: Plessisville, Deschaillons-sur-Saint-Laurent

Highway system
- Quebec provincial highways; Autoroutes; List; Former
← R-263	→ R-267

Route 265 is a two-lane north/south highway on the south shore of the Saint Lawrence River in Quebec, Canada. Its northern terminus is in Deschaillons-sur-Saint-Laurent at the junction of Route 132, and the southern terminus is at the junction of Route 165 in Plessisville. It used to continue up to Black Lake (now part of Thetford Mines) at the junction of Route 112, but the segment between Plessisville and Black Lake was later re-numbered to Route 165 in the 1990s.

== Towns along Route 265 ==
- Deschaillons-sur-Saint-Laurent
- Parisville
- Fortierville
- Sainte-Françoise
- Villeroy
- Notre-Dame-de-Lourdes
- Plessisville

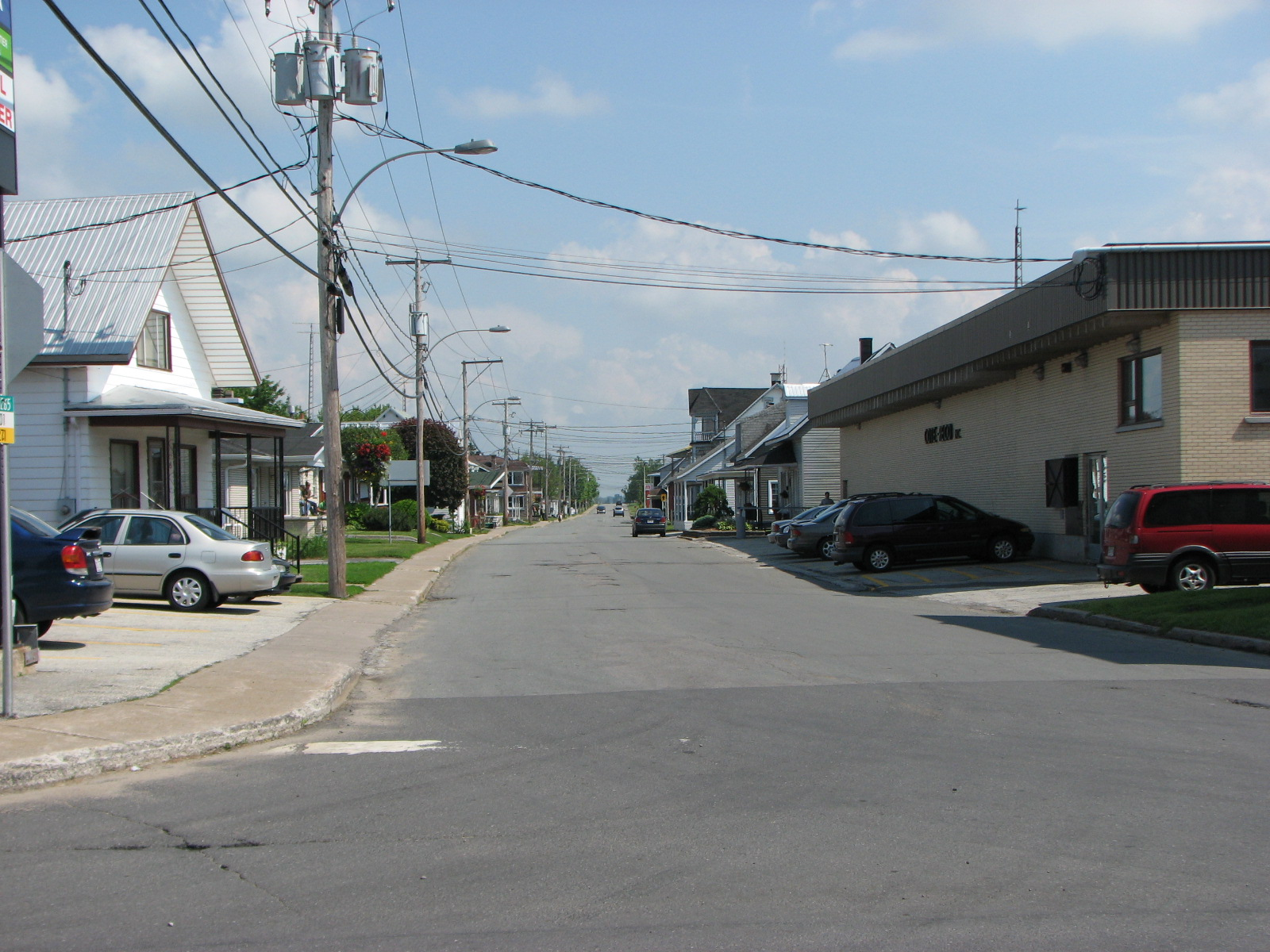
Northern end of the route in Deschaillons-sur-Saint-Laurent.

== See also ==
- List of Quebec provincial highways
