= Fortierville =

- Municipality
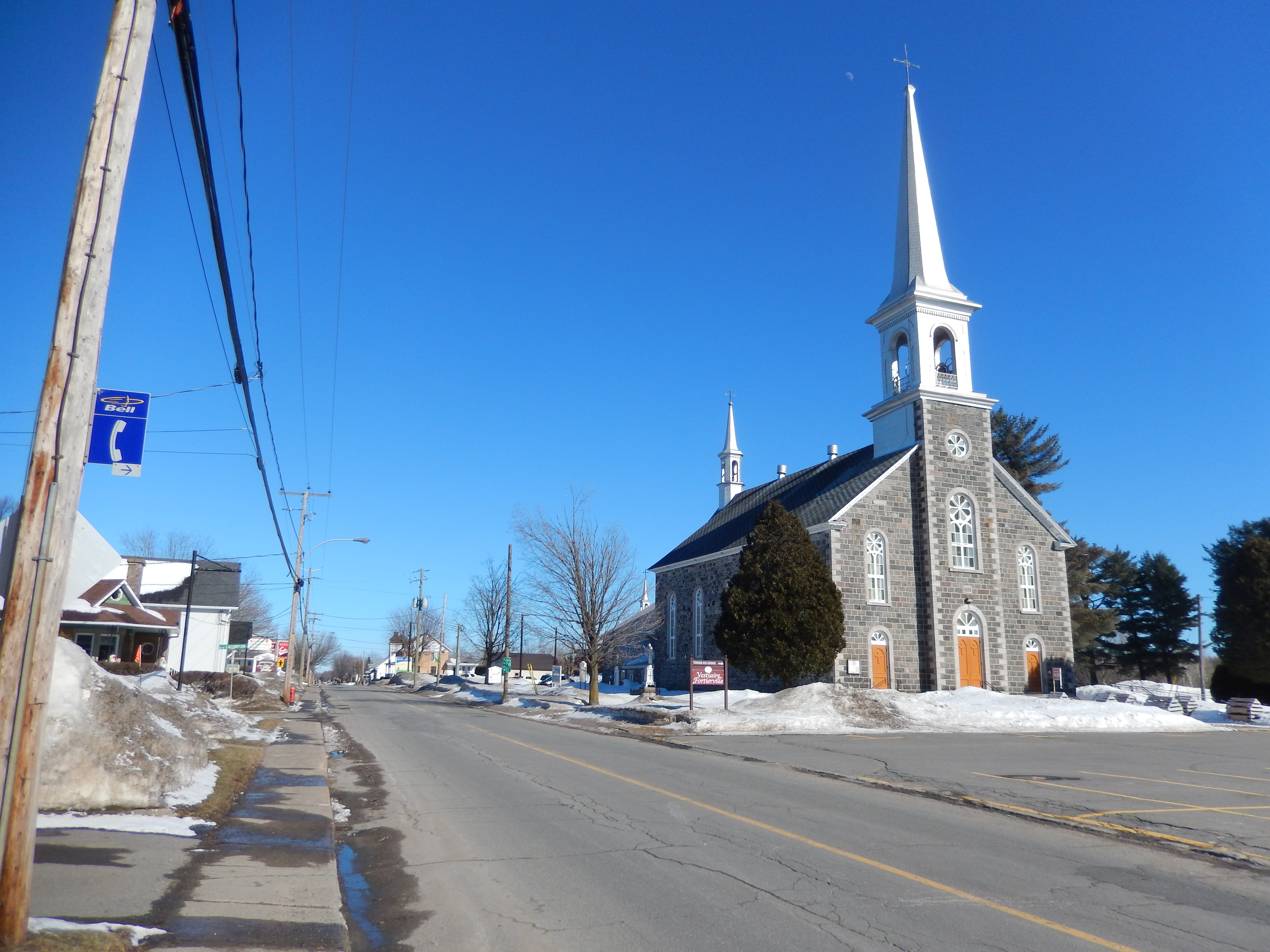
- An photograph of the rural villa

- Coat of arms

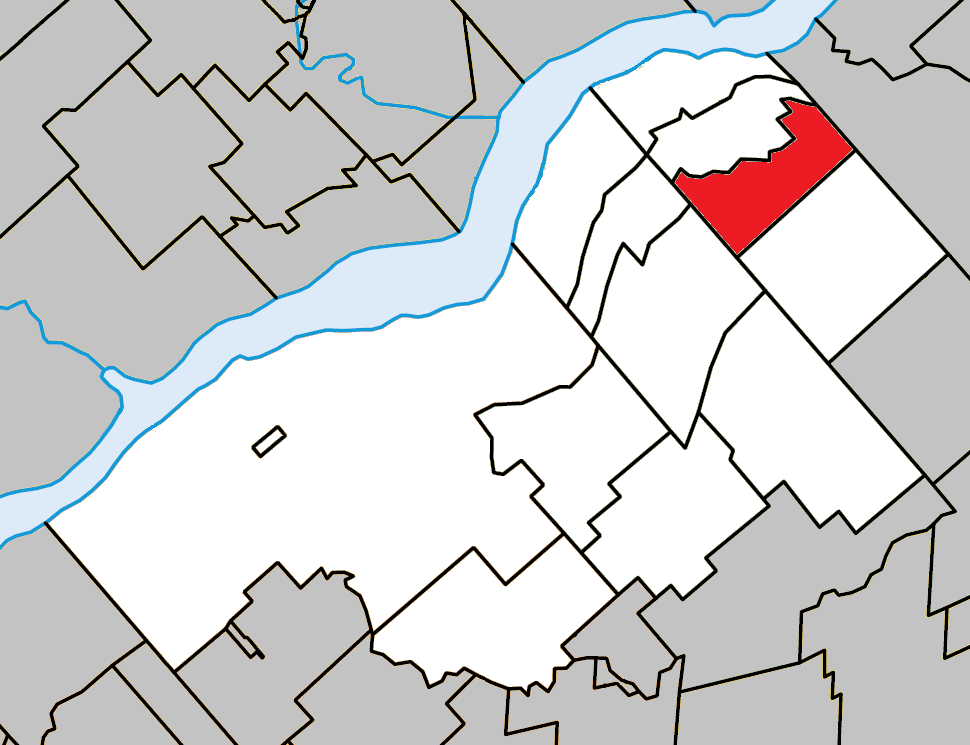
- Location within Bécancour RCM

- Location in southern Quebec
- Coordinates: 46°29′N 72°02′W
- Country: Canada
- Province: Quebec
- Region: Centre-du-Québec
- RCM: Bécancour
- Constituted: June 3, 1998

Government
  - Mayor: Julie Pressé
  - Federal riding: Bécancour—Nicolet—Saurel—Alnôbak
  - Prov. riding: Nicolet-Bécancour

Area
  - Total: 44.40 km^{2} (17.14 sq mi)
  - Land: 44.55 km^{2} (17.20 sq mi)
- There is an apparent contradiction between two authoritative sources

Population (2021)
  - Total: 660
  - Density: 14.8/km^{2} (38/sq mi)
  - Pop 2016-2021: ▼1.3%
  - Dwellings: 301
- Time zone: UTC−05:00 (EST)
  - Summer (DST): UTC−04:00 (EDT)
- Postal code(s): G0S 1J0
- Area code: 819
- Highways: R-226; R-265
- Website: www.fortierville.com

Fortierville (French pronunciation: [fɔʁtjevil]) is a small rural municipality in the Centre-du-Québec region of the province of Quebec in Canada. Before officially becoming a rural municipality named Fortierville on 3 June 1998, it was previously a small rural village named Sainte-Philomène-de-Fortierville. In the 19th and very early 20th centuries, the vast majority of the people who lived in Fortierville were rural peasants, with many of them living below the poverty line. The new local parish church was built and constructed in 1884. The previously small rural village of Sainte-Philomène-de-Fortierville was given electricity in the 1910s. During the Spanish flu in the 1910s, more than 35 outbreaks were recorded in Fortierville. As a quarantine measure of the outbreak, the local parish school for girls in Fortierville was closed down from mid-November 1918 to January 1919. Aurore Gagnon, who was an French Canadian rural peasant girl who had lived and died here from a severe and brutal case of physical child abuse in 1920, was posthumously given the title of historical figure (French: personnage historique) in her own honor, on 7 December 2015.

== Geography ==
=== Climate ===
Climate data for Fortierville, Quebec (1991–2020 normals, extremes 1973–2020)
| Month | Jan | Feb | Mar | Apr | May | Jun | Jul | Aug | Sep | Oct | Nov | Dec | Year |
|---|---|---|---|---|---|---|---|---|---|---|---|---|---|
| Record high °C (°F) | 13.0 (55.4) | 12.5 (54.5) | 23.5 (74.3) | 27.2 (81.0) | 35.4 (95.7) | 35.4 (95.7) | 35.9 (96.6) | 32.5 (90.5) | 33.0 (91.4) | 26.0 (78.8) | 22.0 (71.6) | 15.4 (59.7) | 35.9 (96.6) |
| Mean daily maximum °C (°F) | −6.9 (19.6) | −4.9 (23.2) | 1.2 (34.2) | 9.5 (49.1) | 18.4 (65.1) | 23.3 (73.9) | 25.5 (77.9) | 24.5 (76.1) | 20.0 (68.0) | 12.1 (53.8) | 4.6 (40.3) | −2.9 (26.8) | 10.4 (50.7) |
| Daily mean °C (°F) | −12 (10) | −10.5 (13.1) | −4 (25) | 4.4 (39.9) | 12.1 (53.8) | 17.2 (63.0) | 19.6 (67.3) | 18.6 (65.5) | 14.2 (57.6) | 7.4 (45.3) | 0.9 (33.6) | −6.9 (19.6) | 5.1 (41.2) |
| Mean daily minimum °C (°F) | −16.9 (1.6) | −15.9 (3.4) | −9.0 (15.8) | −1.0 (30.2) | 5.8 (42.4) | 11.1 (52.0) | 14.0 (57.2) | 12.9 (55.2) | 8.3 (46.9) | 2.5 (36.5) | −3.2 (26.2) | −10.9 (12.4) | −0.2 (31.6) |
| Record low °C (°F) | −41.0 (−41.8) | −38.5 (−37.3) | −32 (−26) | −17.5 (0.5) | −4.5 (23.9) | −2.1 (28.2) | 3.5 (38.3) | 1.0 (33.8) | −5.5 (22.1) | −10.0 (14.0) | −25.0 (−13.0) | −36.0 (−32.8) | −41.0 (−41.8) |
| Average precipitation mm (inches) | 80.6 (3.17) | 68.8 (2.71) | 78.7 (3.10) | 93.7 (3.69) | 91.6 (3.61) | 107.8 (4.24) | 132.7 (5.22) | 102.6 (4.04) | 94.5 (3.72) | 104.5 (4.11) | 82.3 (3.24) | 100.3 (3.95) | 1,138 (44.80) |
| Average rainfall mm (inches) | 24.8 (0.98) | 14.0 (0.55) | 30.2 (1.19) | 78.6 (3.09) | 90.7 (3.57) | 107.8 (4.24) | 132.7 (5.22) | 102.6 (4.04) | 94.5 (3.72) | 102.2 (4.02) | 62.7 (2.47) | 38.0 (1.50) | 878.7 (34.59) |
| Average snowfall cm (inches) | 56.3 (22.2) | 54.6 (21.5) | 46.6 (18.3) | 14.5 (5.7) | 0.8 (0.3) | 0.0 (0.0) | 0.0 (0.0) | 0.0 (0.0) | 0.0 (0.0) | 2.6 (1.0) | 18.6 (7.3) | 59.3 (23.3) | 253.2 (99.7) |
| Average precipitation days (≥ 0.2 mm) | 14.0 | 11.7 | 11.9 | 12.4 | 13.9 | 13.9 | 14.7 | 12.7 | 12.6 | 14.3 | 12.9 | 14.4 | 159.3 |
| Average rainy days (≥ 0.2 mm) | 3.0 | 2.4 | 5.3 | 11.2 | 13.9 | 13.9 | 14.7 | 12.7 | 12.6 | 14.2 | 9.6 | 4.6 | 118.1 |
| Average snowy days (≥ 0.2 cm) | 12.5 | 10.7 | 7.8 | 3.0 | 0.21 | 0.0 | 0.0 | 0.0 | 0.0 | 0.7 | 4.4 | 10.8 | 50.1 |
Source: Environment Canada

== Demographics ==
In the 2021 Census of Population conducted by Statistics Canada, Saint-Gabriel-Lalemant had a population of 660 living in 282 of its 301 total private dwellings, a change of −1.3% from its 2016 population of 669. With a land area of 44.55 km^{2} (17.20 sq mi), it had a population density of 14.8/km^{2} (38.4/sq mi) in 2021.

== Notable people ==
- Aurore Gagnon – a French Canadian rural peasant girl who was a victim of severe and brutal physical abuse and murder in 1920. She was posthumously given the title of historical figure (French: personnage historique) in her own honor, in Fortierville on 7 December 2015.

== See also ==
- List of municipalities in Quebec
