= Parisville, Quebec =

Parisville
- Parish municipality
- Municipalité de la Paroisse de Parisville
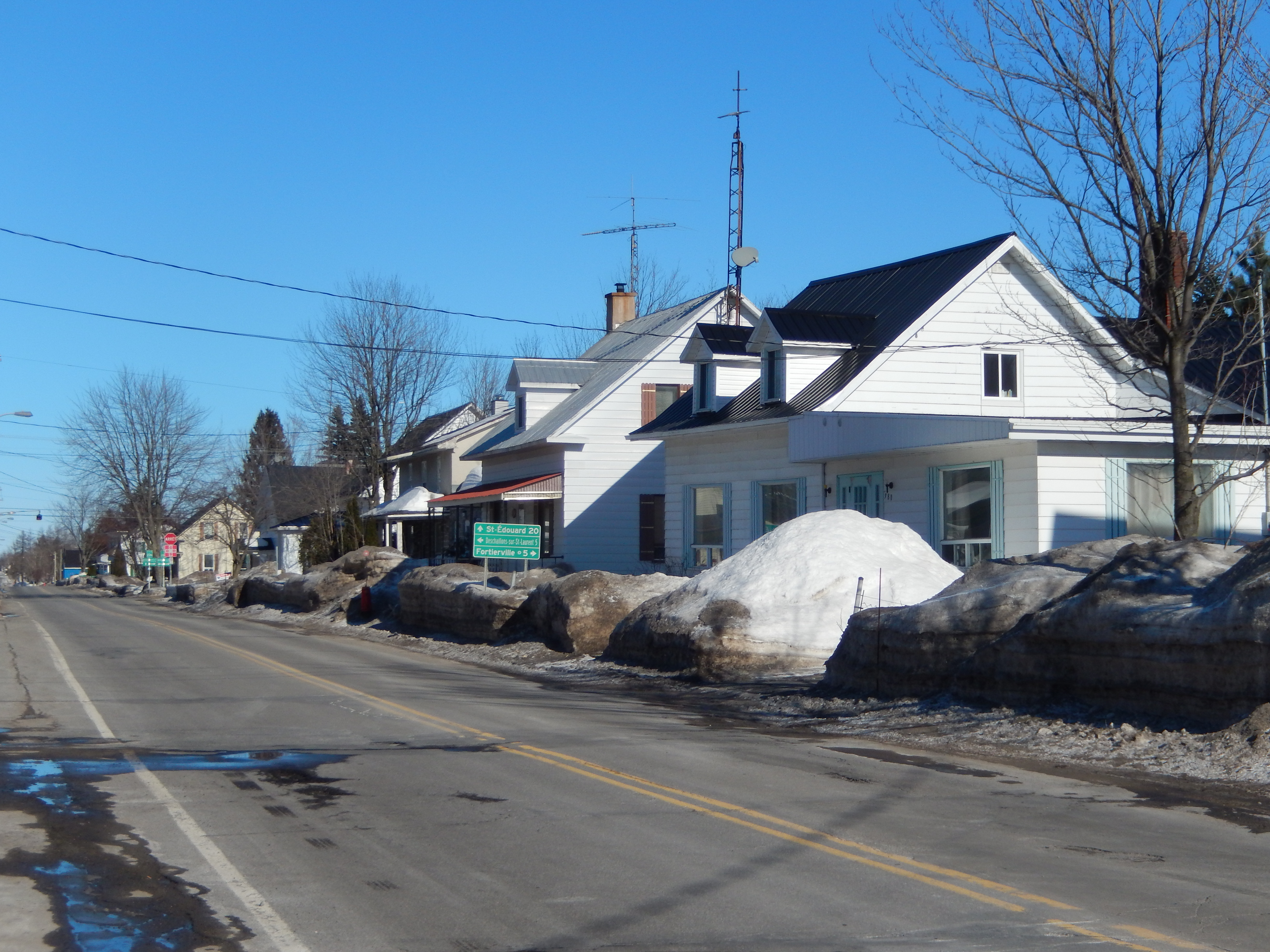

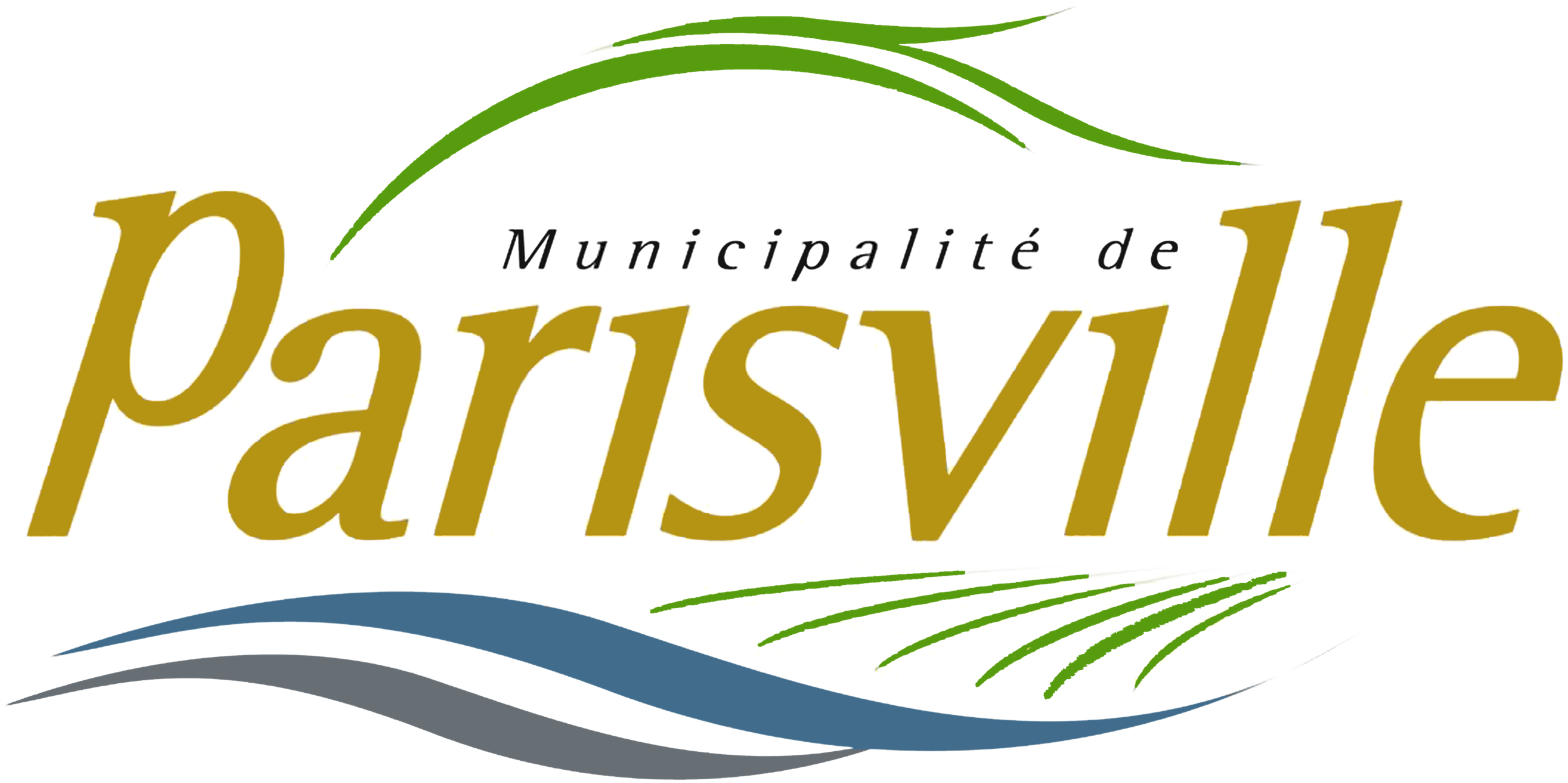
- Seal
- Motto: S'unir pour grandir ("Unite to Grow")
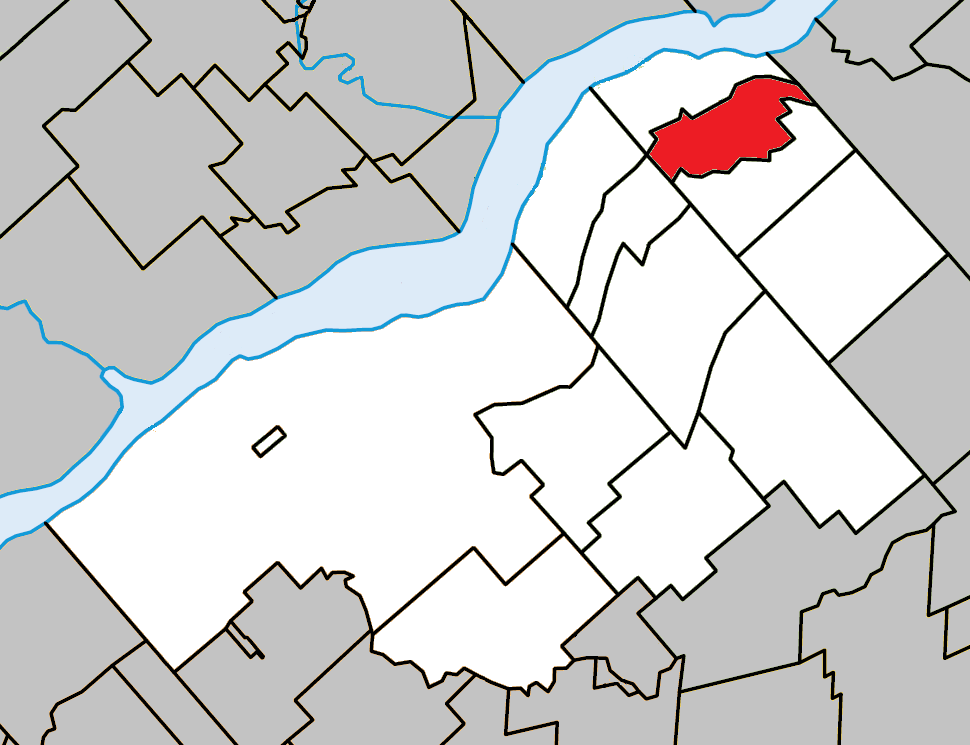
- Location within Bécancour RCM

- Location in southern Quebec
- Coordinates: 46°31′N 72°04′W
- Country: Canada
- Province: Quebec
- Region: Centre-du-Québec
- RCM: Bécancour
- Constituted: March 18, 1901

Government
  - Mayor: René Guimond
  - Federal riding: Bécancour—Nicolet—Saurel—Alnôbak
  - Prov. riding: Nicolet-Bécancour

Area (2021)
  - Total: 35.90 km^{2} (13.86 sq mi)
  - Land: 35.58 km^{2} (13.74 sq mi)

Population (2021)
  - Total: 396
  - Density: 11.1/km^{2} (29/sq mi)
  - Pop 2016-2021: ▼25.3%
  - Dwellings: 198
- Time zone: UTC−05:00 (EST)
  - Summer (DST): UTC−04:00 (EDT)
- Postal code(s): G0S 1X0
- Area code: 819
- Highways: R-226; R-265
- Website: www.municipalite. parisville.qc.ca

Parisville (French pronunciation: [paʁivil]) is a parish municipality in the Bécancour Regional County Municipality, in the Centre-du-Québec region of the province of Quebec in Canada.

Despite being a parish municipality rather than an ordinary municipality, its website refers to it as simply "Municipalité de Parisville" rather than using the official name of "municipalité de paroisse de Parisville".

== Demographics ==
In the 2021 Canadian census conducted by Statistics Canada, Parisville had a population of 396 living in 179 of its 198 total private dwellings, a change of −25.3% from its 2016 population of 530. With a land area of 35.58 km^{2} (13.74 sq mi), it had a population density of 11.1/km^{2} (28.8/sq mi) in 2021.

== See also ==
- List of parish municipalities in Quebec
