= Villeroy, Quebec =

Villeroy
- Municipality
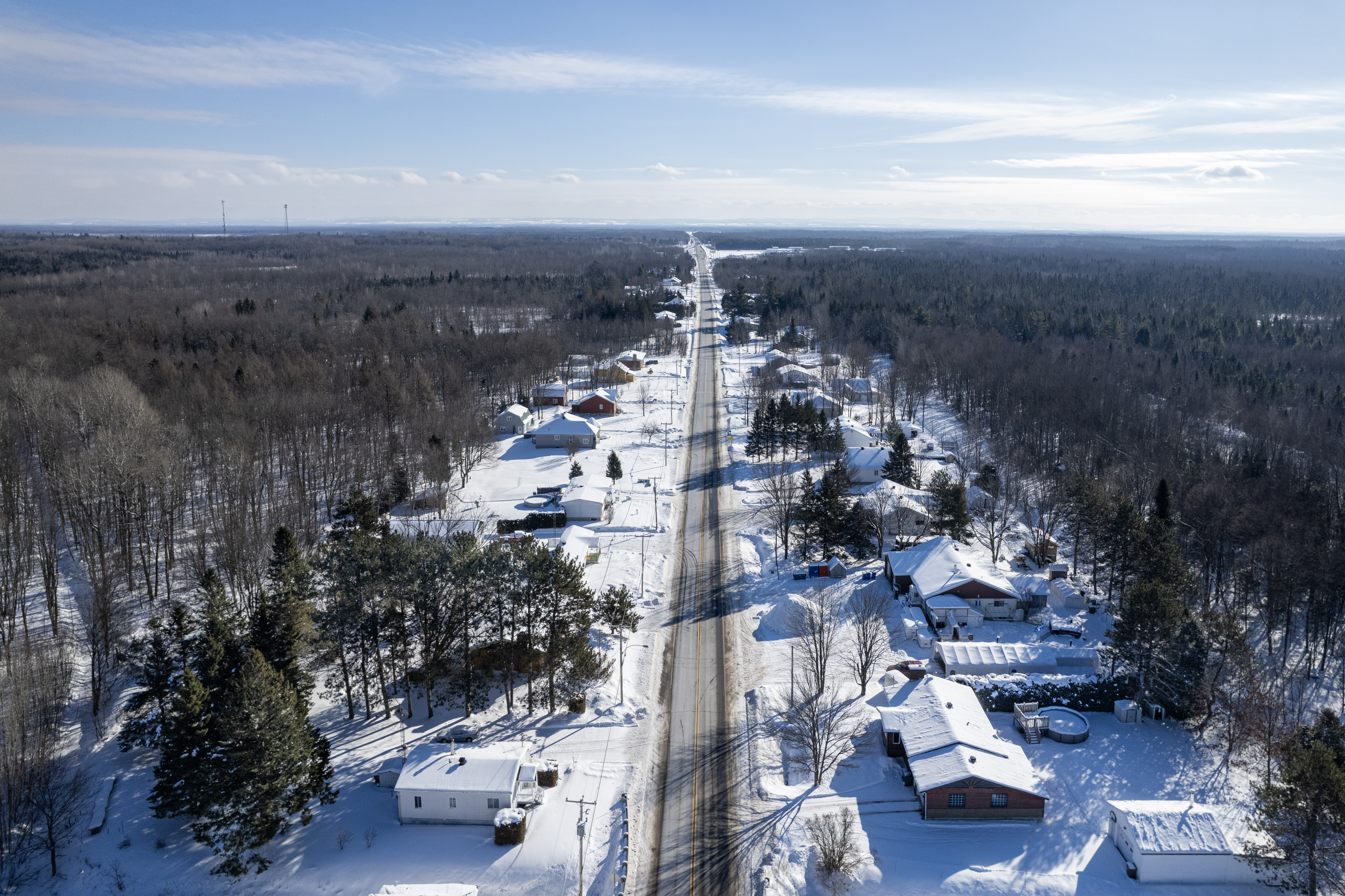

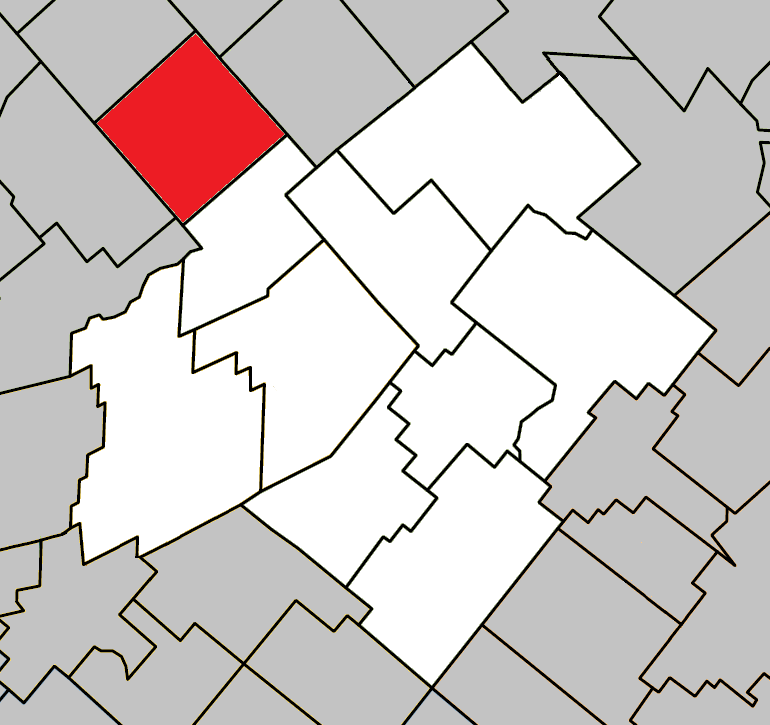
- Location within L'Érable RCM.

- Location in southern Quebec.
- Coordinates: 46°23′N 71°53′W
- Country: Canada
- Province: Quebec
- Region: Centre-du-Québec
- RCM: L'Érable
- Settled: 1898
- Constituted: September 22, 1924

Government
  - Mayor: Patrice Goupil
  - Federal riding: Mégantic—L'Érable—Lotbinière
  - Prov. riding: Arthabaska–L'Érable

Area
  - Total: 101.50 km^{2} (39.19 sq mi)
  - Land: 101.90 km^{2} (39.34 sq mi)
- There is an apparent contradiction between two authoritative sources

Population (2021)
  - Total: 488
  - Density: 4.8/km^{2} (12/sq mi)
  - Pop 2016-2021: ▲6.8%
  - Dwellings: 235
- Time zone: UTC−5 (EST)
  - Summer (DST): UTC−4 (EDT)
- Postal code(s): G0S 3K0
- Area code: 819
- Website: www.municipalite-villeroy.ca

Villeroy (French pronunciation: [vilʁwa]) is a municipality in the Centre-du-Québec region of the province of Quebec in Canada, located within the regional county municipality of L'Érable.

== Demographics ==
Population trend:

- Population in 2021: 488 (2011 to 2016 population change: 6.8%)
- Population in 2016: 457 (2011 to 2016 population change: -5.8%)
- Population in 2011: 485 (2006 to 2011 population change: -2.2%)
- Population in 2006: 496
- Population in 2001: 519
- Population in 1996: 493
- Population in 1991: 544
- Population in 1986: 544
- Population in 1981: 546
- Population in 1976: 543
- Population in 1971: 613
- Population in 1966: 655
- Population in 1961: 722
- Population in 1956: 737
- Population in 1951: 707
- Population in 1941: 853
- Population in 1931: 677

Private dwellings occupied by usual residents: 211 (total dwellings: 235)

Mother tongue:

- English as first language: 1%
- French as first language: 96.9%
- English and French as first language: 1%
- Other as first language: 0%
