= Sauvage River (Gentilly River tributary) =

River in Centre-du-Québec, Quebec (Canada)

- Location within Quebec
- Native name: Rivière Sauvage (French)

Location
- Country: Canada
- Province: Quebec
- Region: Centre-du-Québec
- MRC: Arthabaska Regional County Municipality, Bécancour Regional County Municipality

Physical characteristics
- Source: Forested streams
  - location: Lemieux
  - coordinates: 46.269857°N 72.074009°W
  - elevation: 101 metres (331 ft)
- Mouth: Gentilly River (Quebec)
  - location: Sainte-Marie-de-Blandford
  - coordinates: 46.28639°N 72.16194°W
  - elevation: 81 metres (266 ft)
- Length: 11.4 kilometres (7.1 mi)

Basin features
- River system: Gentilly River (Quebec), St. Lawrence River
- Tributaries
  - left: (upstream) ruisseau Proulx, ruisseau Télesphore-Deshaise, ruisseau Raymond.
  - right: (upstream)

The Sauvage River (in French: rivière Sauvage) is a tributary of the Gentilly River which empties on the south shore of the St. Lawrence River, in the administrative region of Centre-du-Québec, in Quebec, in Canada. The Sauvage River flows through the municipalities of Lemieux (MRC Bécancour Regional County Municipality), Saint-Louis-de-Blandford (MRC Arthabaska Regional County Municipality), Maddington Falls (MRC Arthabaska Regional County Municipality), Saint-Sylvère (MRC Bécancour Regional County Municipality), Sainte-Marie-de-Blandford (MRC Bécancour Regional County Municipality).

== Geography ==
The main neighboring hydrographic slopes of the Sauvage River are:

- north side: Gentilly River, Beaudet River;
- east side: rivière du Moulin, Bécancour River, Gentilly River;
- south side: Bécancour River, Saint-Sylvestre stream;
- west side: Gentilly South-West River, Bécancour River.

The Sauvage River has its source in a marsh area in the southern part of the municipality of Lemieux. This headland is located 2.7 kilometres (1.7 mi) northwest of highway 20, 3.0 kilometres (1.9 mi) southeast of the village of Lemieux and west of the village of Saint-Louis-de-Blandford as well as 0.8 kilometres (0.50 mi) from the inter-MRC limit of Bécancour Regional County Municipality) and Arthabaska.

From its head zone, the Sauvage River flows for 11.4 kilometres (7.1 mi), in a forest and agricultural zone, with a drop of 20 metres (66 ft), divided into the following segments:

- 2.5 kilometres (1.6 mi) southwest, to the intermunicipal limit of Lemieux and Maddington Falls;
- 1.6 kilometres (0.99 mi) to the southwest, in Saint-Louis-de-Blandford, juxtaposing the intermunicipal boundary with Lemieux and Maddington Falls;
- 2.1 kilometres (1.3 mi) north-west, in the municipality of Maddington Falls, to the municipal limit of Lemieux;
- 0.25 kilometres (0.16 mi) north-west, in the municipality of Saint-Sylvère, to the route des Cyprès which constitutes the intermunicipal limit between Saint-Sylvère and Lemieux;
- 3.9 kilometres (2.4 mi) north, in Lemieux, to Route de l'École;
- 0.6 kilometres (0.37 mi) north-west, to the limit of Sainte-Marie-de-Blandford;
- 0.4 kilometres (0.25 mi) west, in Sainte-Marie-de-Blandford, until its confluence.

The Sauvage River empties on the south bank of the Gentilly River. Its confluence is located 3.7 kilometres (2.3 mi) west of the center of the village of Lemieux, 4.0 kilometres (2.5 mi) east of the village of Sainte-Gertrude, 4.0 kilometres (2.5 mi) south of the village of Sainte-Marie-de-Blandford and 4.3 kilometres (2.7 mi) north of the village of Daveluyville.

== Toponymy ==
The toponym "rivière Sauvage" was made official on August 18, 1978, at the Commission de toponymie du Québec.

== See also ==
- List of rivers of Quebec
