= Rivière aux Glaises =

River in Centre-du-Québec, Quebec (Canada)

- Location within Quebec

Location
- Country: Canada
- Province: Quebec
- Region: Centre-du-Québec
- MRC: Bécancour Regional County Municipality

Physical characteristics
- Source: Agricultural streams
  - location: Bécancour
  - coordinates: 46.397712°N 72.180499°W
  - elevation: 72 metres (236 ft)
- Mouth: St. Lawrence River
  - location: Bécancour
  - coordinates: 46.43611°N 72.23278°W
  - elevation: 5 metres (16 ft)
- Length: 9.5 kilometres (5.9 mi)

Basin features
- River system: St. Lawrence River
- Tributaries
  - left: (upstream)
  - right: (upstream)

The rivière aux Glaises (in English: Clay River) is a tributary of the south shore of the St. Lawrence River. This river flows in the territory of the sector of Gentilly of the town of Bécancour and in the municipality of Saint-Pierre-les-Becquets, in the Bécancour Regional County Municipality, in the administrative region of Centre-du-Québec, in Quebec, in Canada.

== Toponymy ==
The Rivière aux Glaises owes its name to the clayey nature of its bed. The name appears on a 1938 map of Nicolet County, but its use is probably older.

== Geography ==
The main neighboring watersheds of the Glaises river are:

- North side: St. Lawrence River;
- East side: Ours stream, Sources stream, rivière aux Orignaux;
- South side: Bras Chaud stream, Beaudet River, Gentilly River;
- West side: rivière du Moulin, rivière de la Ferme, Gentilly River.

The Glaises river has its source in an agricultural zone in the Gentilly sector, east of the town of Bécancour. This zone is located very close to the municipal boundary of Sainte-Marie-de-Blandford and Saint-Pierre-les-Becquets. This head area is located southeast of the village of Gentilly, south of the village of Sainte-Cécile-de-Lévrard and north of the village of Sainte-Marie-de-Blandford.

From its head area, the Rivière aux Glaises flows over 9.5 kilometres (5.9 mi) with a drop of 67 metres (220 ft), divided into the following segments:

- 2.2 kilometres (1.4 mi) north-east, up to the municipal limit of Bécancour and Saint-Pierre-les-Becquets;
- 2.5 kilometres (1.6 mi) north-east then north-west, in Saint-Pierre-les-Becquets, to a road on rang Saint-François-Xavier;
- 1.8 kilometres (1.1 mi) going north-west, up to a road on rang Sainte-Cécile;
- 0.5 kilometres (0.31 mi) west, up to the municipal limit of Saint-Pierre-les-Becquets;
- 1.9 kilometres (1.2 mi) west, in Bécancour, to route 132;
- 0.6 kilometres (0.37 mi) northwesterly, up to its confluence.

The Rivière aux Glaises flows onto the south shore of the St. Lawrence River, in the eastern part of the territory of the city of Bécancour. Its confluence is located east of the village of Gentilly, 0.3 kilometres (0.19 mi) west of the confluence of the Aux Orignaux river and 2.1 kilometres (1.3 mi) to the northeast from the confluence of the Moulin river.

== See also ==
- List of rivers of Quebec
