= Rivière aux Orignaux =

River in Centre-du-Québec, Quebec (Canada)

Rivière aux Orignaux Old name: Ruisseau Chaud
- Location within Quebec

Location
- Country: Canada
- Province: Quebec
- Region: Centre-du-Québec
- MRC: Bécancour Regional County Municipality

Physical characteristics
- Source: Confluence of "bras Chand" and "bras de Cretons"
  - location: Sainte-Sophie-de-Lévrard
  - coordinates: 46.387362°N 72.121457°W
  - elevation: 72 metres (236 ft)
- Mouth: St. Lawrence River
  - location: Bécancour
  - coordinates: 46.43833°N 72.23278°W
  - elevation: 5 metres (16 ft)
- Length: 9.5 kilometres (5.9 mi)

Basin features
- River system: St. Lawrence River
- Tributaries
  - left: (upstream)
  - right: (upstream)

The rivière aux Orignaux (in English: Moose River) is a tributary of the south shore of the St. Lawrence River. This river flows in the municipality of Sainte-Sophie-de-Lévrard, Saint-Pierre-les-Becquets and in the area of Gentilly of the town of Bécancour and in the Bécancour Regional County Municipality, in the administrative region of Centre-du-Québec, in Quebec, in Canada.

== Toponymy ==
The name of the river appears on an 1858 map. It underlines the ancient presence of the original in Centre-du-Québec. It was also known under the name of Chaud brook.

== Geography ==
The main neighboring watersheds of the Orignaux River are:

- North side: La Plaine stream, St. Lawrence River, Petite rivière du Chêne;
- East side: Sources stream, Petite rivière du Chêne;
- South side: Ours stream, rivière aux Glaises, Bras Chaud creek, Beaudet River, Gentilly River;
- West side: St. Lawrence River, rivière du Moulin.

The Rivière des Orignaux takes its source in an agricultural zone to the south of the village of Sainte-Sophie-de-Lévrard, at the confluence of the Bras Chaud stream (having its source in Sainte-Marie-de-Blandford) and Bras de Cretons (taking its source in Lemieux).

From its head area, the Orignaux River flows over 31.2 kilometres (19.4 mi), with a drop of 67 metres (220 ft), divided into the following segments:

Upper course of the river (segment of 14.8 kilometres (9.2 mi))

- 0.9 kilometres (0.56 mi) north-east to a country road;
- 3.3 kilometres (2.1 mi) north-east, winding up to Chemin Saint-Agathe;
- 0.6 kilometres (0.37 mi) north, winding and curving west, returning to Chemin Saint-Agathe;
- 4.2 kilometres (2.6 mi) north, passing east of the village of Sainte-Sophie-de-Lévrard and winding up to route 226 where it collects the waters of the Bass Ruisseau du Sixième Rang;
- 2.9 kilometres (1.8 mi) north-west, winding up to the road to Rang Saint-Ovide;
- 2.9 kilometres (1.8 mi) (or 1.6 kilometres (0.99 mi) in a direct line) towards the north-west, winding up to the road to Rang Saint-François-Xavier where it collects the water Ruisseau Zéphirin-Mailhot;

Lower course of the river (segment of 16.4 kilometres (10.2 mi))

From the route du rang Saint-François-Xavier (east of the village of Sainte-Cécile-de-Lévrard, the river flows over:

- 4.0 kilometres (2.5 mi) (or 1.3 kilometres (0.81 mi) in a direct line) towards the southwest, winding up to route 218;
- 5.2 kilometres (3.2 mi) (or 1.9 kilometres (1.2 mi) in a direct line) towards the south-west, winding and passing south of the village of Sainte-Cécile-de-Lévrard, until the road to Rang Sainte-Cécile;
- 3.0 kilometres (1.9 mi) (or 2.0 kilometres (1.2 mi) in a direct line) towards the south-west, winding up to the route du rang Saint-Charles;
- 3.6 kilometres (2.2 mi) (or 1.8 kilometres (1.1 mi) in a direct line) westward, winding up to route 132;
- 0.6 kilometres (0.37 mi) westward, up to its confluence.

Rivière aux Orignaux empties at the tip of Rivière aux Orignaux, on the south shore of the Estuary of Saint Lawrence, at the extreme east of the territory of the town of Bécancour (Gentilly sector). Its confluence is located at 4.6 kilometres (2.9 mi) north-east of the center of the village of Gentilly, south of the village of Saint-Pierre-les-Becquets, at 0.3 kilometres (0.19 mi) at the east of the confluence of the Rivière aux Glaises and at 2.4 kilometres (1.5 mi) northeast of the confluence of the Rivière du Moulin.

== See also ==
- List of rivers of Quebec
