= Rivière de la Ferme =

River in Centre-du-Québec, Quebec (Canada)

- Location within Quebec

Location
- Country: Canada
- Province: Quebec
- Region: Centre-du-Québec
- MRC: Bécancour Regional County Municipality

Physical characteristics
- Source: Agricultural streams
  - location: Bécancour
  - coordinates: 46.354902°N 72.279342°W
  - elevation: 34 metres (112 ft)
- Mouth: St. Lawrence River
  - location: Bécancour
  - coordinates: 46.40472°N 72.30556°W
  - elevation: 5 metres (16 ft)
- Length: 6.8 kilometres (4.2 mi)

Basin features
- River system: St. Lawrence River
- Tributaries
  - left: (upstream) ruisseau Beaudet
  - right: (upstream) ruisseau Lemarier, ruisseau Mailhot

The rivière de la Ferme (in English: Farm river) is a tributary of the south shore of the St. Lawrence River. This river flows in the territory of the town of Bécancour, in the Bécancour Regional County Municipality, in the administrative region of Centre-du-Québec, in Quebec, in Canada.

== Geography ==
The main neighboring watersheds of the Rivière de la Ferme are:

- North side: St. Lawrence River;
- East side: rivière du Moulin, rivière aux Glaises, rivière aux Orignaux;
- South side: Gentilly River, Beaudet River;
- West side: Gentilly River.

The Rivière de la Ferme has its source in an agricultural zone to the south of the village of Gentilly and to the north of the Gentilly river.

From its head area, the Ferme River flows over 6.8 kilometres (4.2 mi) with a drop of 29 metres (95 ft), divided into the following segments:

- 0.5 kilometres (0.31 mi) west, to Chemin Saint-François-Xavier;
- 2.2 kilometres (1.4 mi) north, to Chemin des Bouvreuils;
- 2.8 kilometres (1.7 mi) north, passing west of the village of Gentilly, to route 132;
- 1.3 kilometres (0.81 mi) north, up to its confluence.

The Rivière de la Ferme flows into La Petite Anse opposite the Gentilly flats on the south shore of the St. Lawrence River. Its confluence is located to the west of the village of Gentilly and to the west of the town of Bécancour.

== Toponymy ==
The toponym Rivière de la Ferme was formalized on December 5, 1968, at the Commission de toponymie du Québec.

== See also ==
- List of rivers of Quebec
