= Rivière du Moulin (Bécancour River tributary) =

River in Centre-du-Québec, Quebec, Canada

- Location within Quebec

Location
- Country: Canada
- Province: Quebec
- Region: Centre-du-Québec
- MRC: Arthabaska Regional County Municipality

Physical characteristics
- Source: Streams
  - location: Saint-Louis-de-Blandford
  - coordinates: 46.308483°N 71.945922°W
  - elevation: 110 m (360 ft)
- Mouth: Bécancour River
  - location: Saint-Louis-de-Blandford
  - coordinates: 46.25055°N 72.0225°W
  - elevation: 90 m (300 ft)
- Length: 5.9 km (3.7 mi)

Basin features
- Progression: Bécancour River, St. Lawrence River
- Tributaries
  - left: (upstream)
  - right: (upstream)

The rivière du Moulin (in English: Mill River) is a tributary of the Bécancour River which flows on the south shore of the St. Lawrence River into the Estuary of Saint Lawrence.

The Rivière du Moulin flows entirely in the municipality of Saint-Louis-de-Blandford, located in the Arthabaska Regional County Municipality, in the administrative region of Centre-du-Québec, in Québec, in Canada.

== Geography ==
The main hydrographic slopes near the "rivière du Moulin" are:

- north side: Gentilly River, Petite rivière du Chêne;
- east side: Bécancour River;
- south side: Bécancour River;
- west side: Bécancour River, Sauvage River.

The Moulin river takes its source in the locality "La Petite Belgique", in the area south of highway 20, in the municipality of Saint-Louis-de-Blandford. This area is located 3.3 km (2.1 mi) north of the Bécancour River and 4.6 km (2.9 mi) northeast of the village center of Saint-Louis-de-Blandford.

From its head area, the Moulin river flows over 5.9 km (3.7 mi) divided into the following segments:

- 4.6 kilometres (2.9 mi) southwest, along (on the south side) highway 20, to route 263;
- 1.3 kilometres (0.81 mi) south, to its confluence.

The Moulin River flows on the north bank of the Bécancour River. Its confluence is located 3.5 km (2.2 mi) upstream from the highway 20 bridge and 2.5 km (1.6 mi) downstream from the route 162 bridge, which passes through the village of Saint-Louis-de-Blandford.

== Toponymy ==
The toponym "rivière du Moulin" was made official on November 17, 1979, at the Commission de toponymie du Québec.

== See also ==
- List of rivers of Quebec
