= Beaudet River (Gentilly River tributary) =

River in Centre-du-Québec, Quebec (Canada)

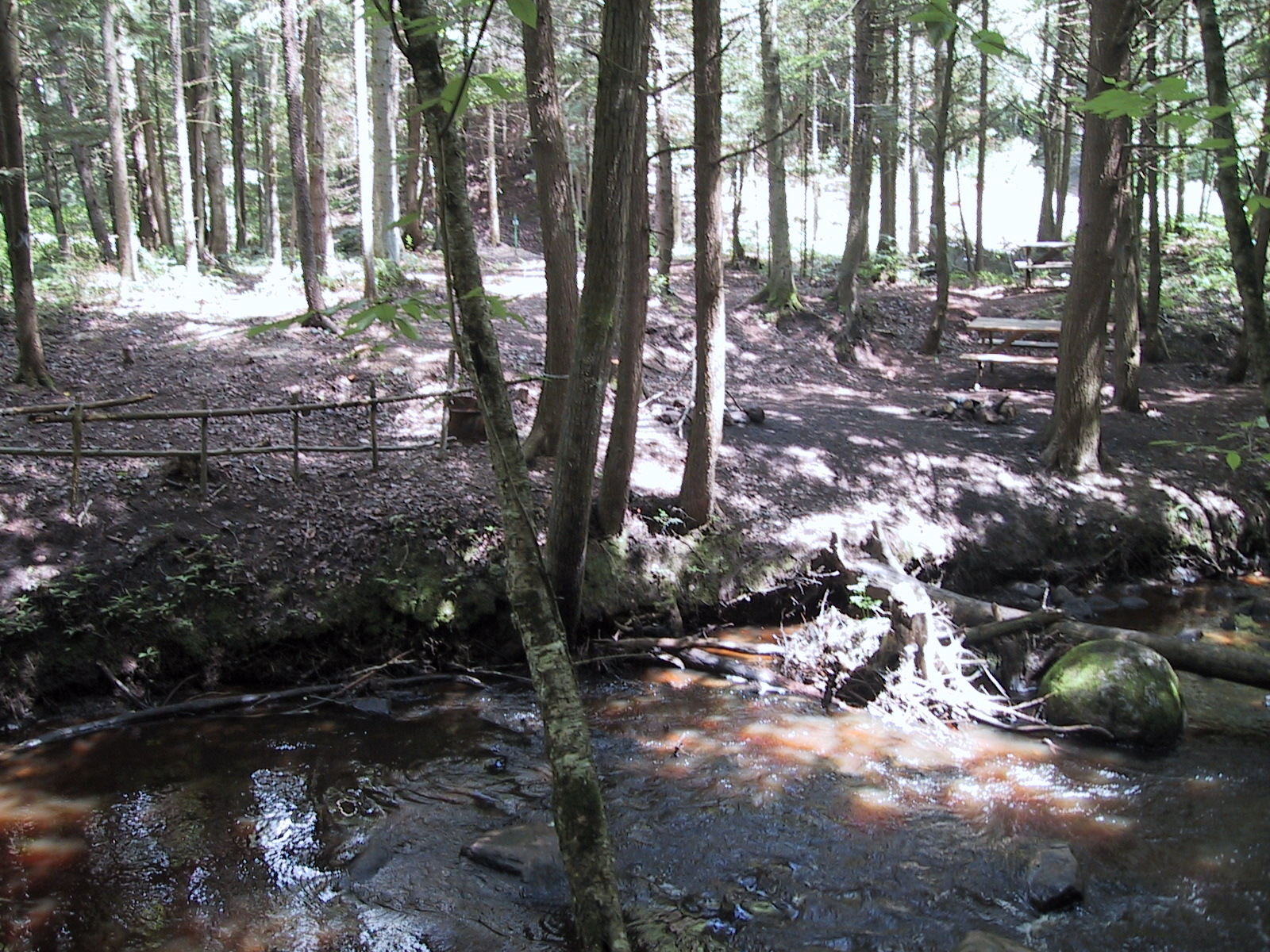

- Location within Quebec
- Native name: Rivière Beaudet (French)

Location
- Country: Canada
- Province: Quebec
- Region: Centre-du-Québec
- MRC: Bécancour Regional County Municipality

Physical characteristics
- Source: Forested streams
  - location: Sainte-Marie-de-Blandford
  - coordinates: 46.322682°N 72.134435°W
  - elevation: 98 metres (322 ft)
- Mouth: Gentilly River (Quebec)
  - location: Sainte-Marie-de-Blandford
  - coordinates: 46.32972°N 72.24416°W
  - elevation: 46 metres (151 ft)
- Length: 10.1 kilometres (6.3 mi)

Basin features
- River system: Gentilly River (Quebec), St. Lawrence River
- Tributaries
  - left: (upstream)
  - right: (upstream)

The Beaudet River (in French: rivière Beaudet) is a tributary of the Gentilly River which flows onto the south shore of the St. Lawrence River.

The Beaudet river flows in the municipalities of Sainte-Marie-de-Blandford, located in the Bécancour Regional County Municipality), in the region administrative office of Centre-du-Québec, in Quebec, in Canada.

== Geography ==
The main neighboring hydrographic slopes of the Beaudet River are:

- north side: rivière aux Glaises, rivière aux Orignaux (Gentilly), rivière du Moulin (Gentilly);
- east side: rivière du Moulin (Bécancour River tributary), Gentilly River, Petite rivière du Chêne, Geoffroy stream;
- south side: Gentilly River, Bécancour River;
- west side: Gentilly River, Gentilly South-West River, Bécancour River.

The Beaudet River rises at the limit of the municipalities of Lemieux and Sainte-Marie-de-Blandford. This head area is located in the southern part of Sainte-Marie-de-Blandford 3.2 kilometres (2.0 mi) east of the village, 3.1 kilometres (1.9 mi) northwest of the village center of Lemieux and 11.6 kilometres (7.2 mi) south of the village of Sainte-Sophie-de-Lévrard.

From its head zone, the Beaudet River flows over 10.1 kilometres (6.3 mi) with a drop of 52 metres (171 ft), divided into the following segments:

- 3.1 kilometres (1.9 mi) northwest, to route 226;
- 2.1 kilometres (1.3 mi) west, to route 263;
- 4.9 kilometres (3.0 mi) west, crossing the Route des Flamants, to its confluence.

The Beaudet River empties on the west bank of the Gentilly River. Its confluence is located 3.7 km northeast of the center of the village of Sainte-Gertrude and 4.5 kilometres (2.8 mi) west of the village of Sainte-Marie-de-Blandford.

== Toponymy ==
The toponym "rivière Baudet" was made official on August 17, 1978, at the Commission de toponymie du Québec.

== See also ==
- List of rivers of Quebec
