= Rivière-Gentilly Regional Park =

Parc régional de la Rivière-Gentilly
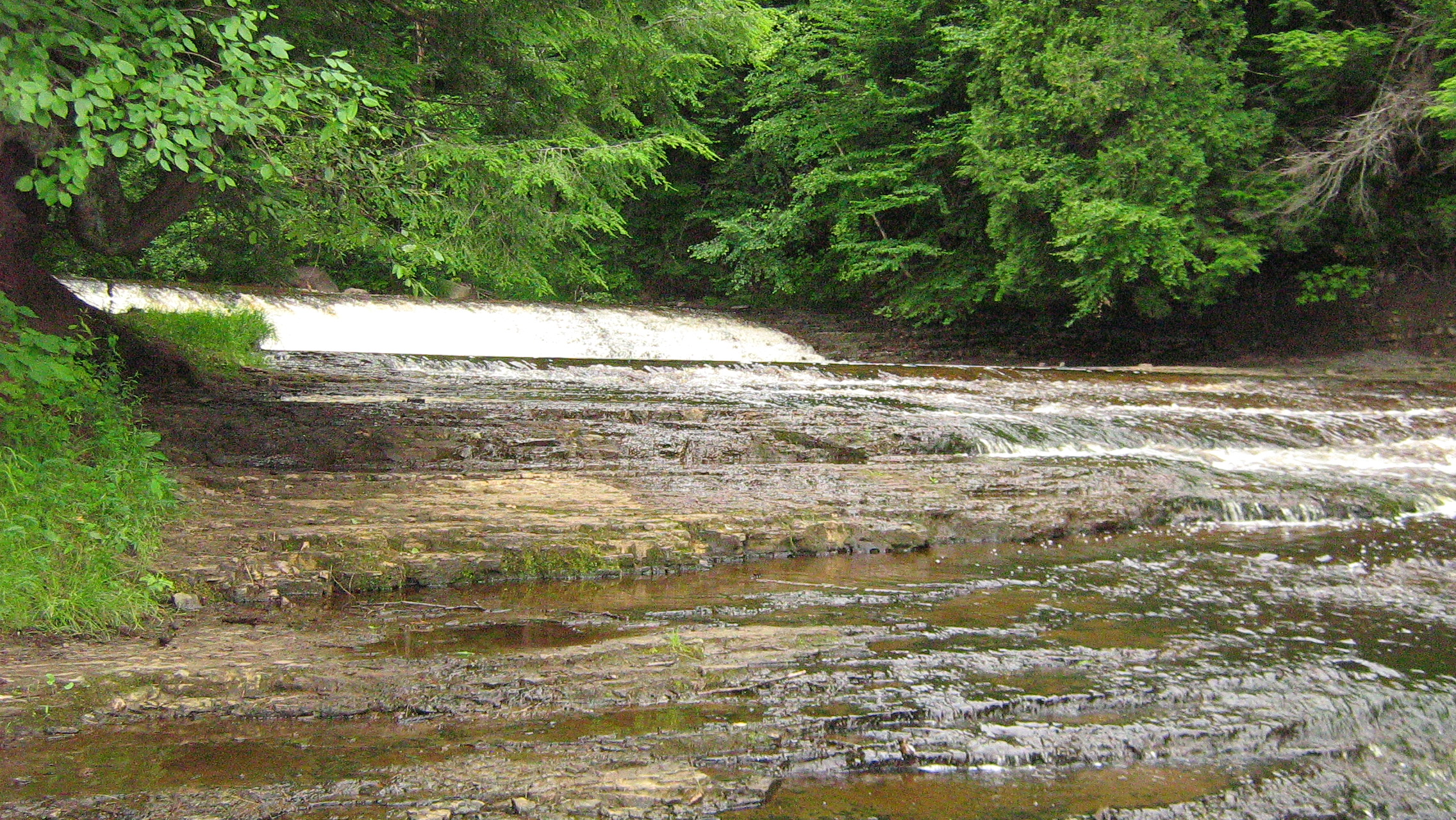
- Falls on the Gentilly River in the park.

- Location within Quebec
- Location: Canada, Quebec, Centre-du-Québec, Bécancour Regional County Municipality
- Nearest city: Bécancour
- Coordinates: 46.31111°N 72.21944°W
- Created: 1992
- Governing body: Association pour la mise en valeur de la rivière Gentilly inc

The Parc régional de la Rivière-Gentilly is a regional park Quebec for recreational and sports activities. It is located on the banks of the Gentilly River at Sainte-Marie-de-Blandford and Bécancour, in Bécancour Regional County Municipality, in administrative region of Centre-du-Québec, in Quebec, in Canada.

== Activities ==
This recreational tourism park offers a range of activities such as hiking, mountain biking and snowshoeing, as well as chalet camping. It also offers Sainte-Gertrude (sector of Bécancour) an equestrian campsite and trails for equestrian trails.

== Administration ==
This regional park is administered by the "Association for the Development of the Gentilly River Inc.", a non-profit organization established on June 3, 1992 under the Quebec Companies Act (part 3). This organization is managed by a board of directors.

== History of the parc ==
Omer Thibodeau is the son of Alphonse Thibodeau who had bought and operated a sawmill.

== See also ==
- Gentilly River
