= Rivière du Moulin (Gentilly) =

River in Centre-du-Québec, Quebec, Canada

- Location within Quebec

Location
- Country: Canada
- Province: Quebec
- Region: Centre-du-Québec
- MRC: Bécancour Regional County Municipality

Physical characteristics
- Source: Agricultural streams
  - location: Bécancour
  - coordinates: 46.373163°N 72.221601°W
  - elevation: 38 metres (125 ft)
- Mouth: St. Lawrence River
  - location: Bécancour
  - coordinates: 46.41833°N 72.25333°W
  - elevation: 5 metres (16 ft)
- Length: 9.6 kilometres (6.0 mi)

Basin features
- River system: St. Lawrence River
- Tributaries
  - left: (upstream)
  - right: (upstream) ruisseau Rosaire-Mailhaot, ruisseau Hector-Baril, ruisseau Euclide-Foisson

The rivière du Moulin (in English: Mill River) is a tributary of the south shore of the St. Lawrence River. This river flows in the area of Gentilly of the town of Bécancour, in the Bécancour Regional County Municipality, in the administrative region of Centre-du-Québec, in Quebec, in Canada.

== Geography ==
The main neighboring watersheds of the Moulin river are:

- North side: St. Lawrence River;
- East side: rivière aux Glaises, rivière aux Orignaux;
- South side: Gentilly River, Beaudet River;
- West side: rivière de la Ferme, Gentilly River.

The Moulin river takes its source in an agricultural area to the south-east of the village of Gentilly and to the north of the Gentilly river.

From its head area, the Moulin river flows over 9.6 kilometres (6.0 mi) with a drop of 33 metres (108 ft), divided into the following segments:

- 0.9 kilometres (0.56 mi) westward, to route 263;
- 2.7 kilometres (1.7 mi) north-west, to Chemin des Bouvreuils;
- 2.1 kilometres (1.3 mi) north, to the rang Saint-Charles road which passes south of the village of Gentilly;
- 3.9 kilometres (2.4 mi) northeasterly, crossing a first road, then route 132, up to its confluence.

The Rivière du Moulin flows onto the south shore of the St. Lawrence River, in the eastern part of the territory of the town of Bécancour, that is to say to the northeast of the village of Gentilly. Its confluence is located east of the village of Gentilly and 2.4 kilometres (1.5 mi) west of the confluence of the Orignaux river (Gentilly) and 2.1 kilometres (1.3 mi) at west of the confluence of the Rivière aux Glaises.

== Toponymy ==
The toponym Rivière du Moulin was made official on December 5, 1968, at the Commission de toponymie du Québec.

== See also ==
- List of rivers of Quebec
