= Gentilly River =

Gentilly River may refer to:

- Gentilly River (Quebec), a tributary of the St. Lawrence River in Bécancour Regional County Municipality, Centre-du-Québec, Quebec, Canada
- Gentilly River (Minnesota), a tributary of the Red Lake River in Minnesota, United States

== See also ==
- Gentilly South-West River, a tributary of the river in Quebec
