= Bécancour =

Bécancour may refer to a location in Canada:

- Bécancour, Quebec, the amalgamated city
  - Bécancour, Quebec (community), a sector of the same city
- Bécancour Regional County Municipality, Quebec
- Bécancour River, a river within the Saint Lawrence River watershed

== See also ==
- Bas-Richelieu—Nicolet—Bécancour, a Canadian electoral district
