= Saint Louis River =

Saint Louis River or Saint-Louis River may refer to:

== Canada ==
- Saint-Louis River (Yamaska River tributary), a tributary of the Yamaska River in Quebec
- Saint-Louis River (Beauharnois), a tributary of the Saint Lawrence River in Quebec
- Saint-Louis River (Du Loup River tributary) (see List of rivers of Quebec#North shore of St Lawrence river – between Repentigny and Trois-Rivières)
- Saint-Louis River (Valin River tributary), a tributary of the Valin River in Quebec
- Rivière de Grand-Saint-Louis, a tributary of the Gentilly River South-West in Quebec

== United States ==
- Saint Louis River (Lake Superior tributary)

== Guadeloupe ==
- Rivière de Saint-Louis, a river on the island of Marie-Galante
