= Pépé et sa Guitare =

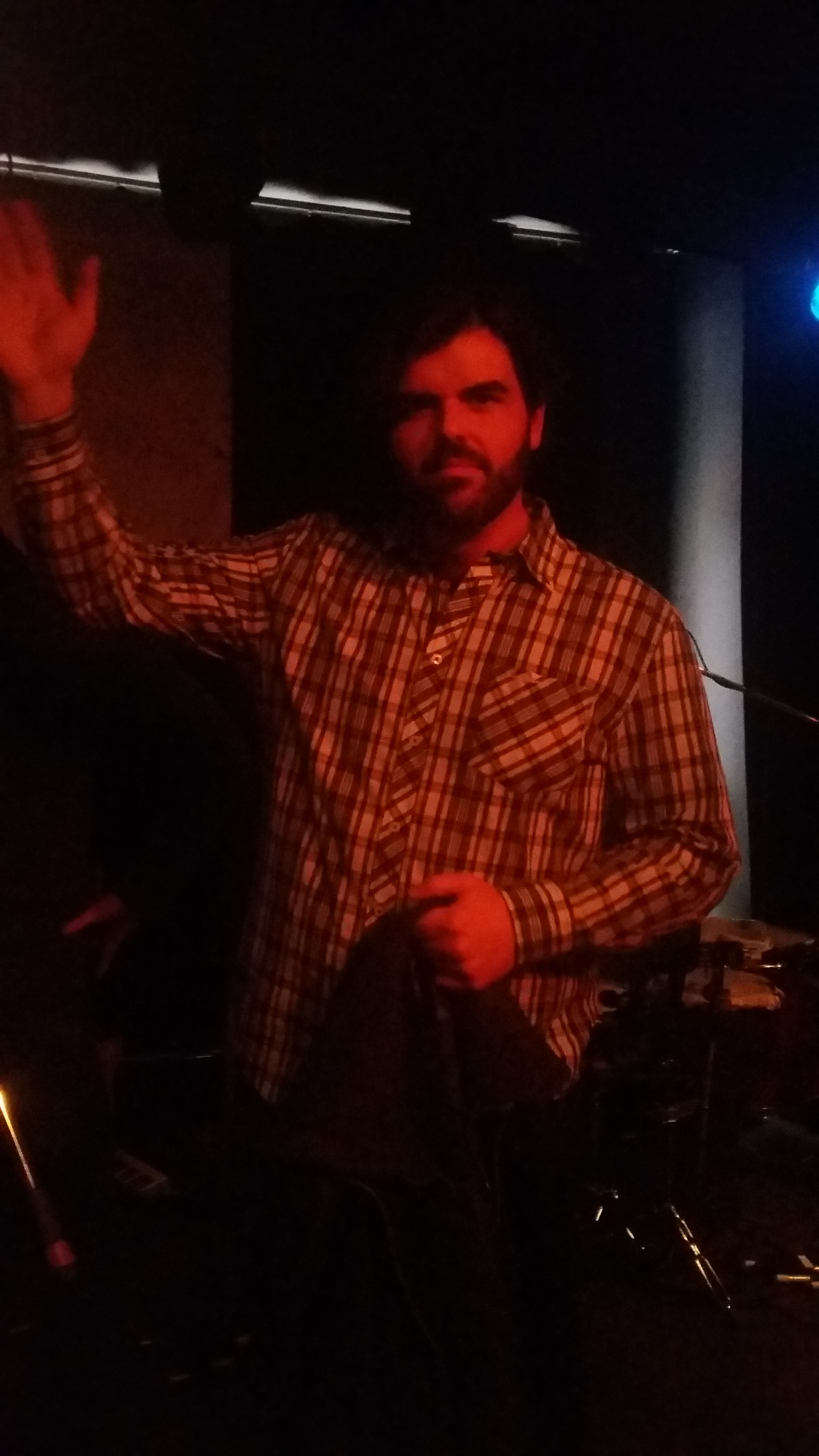
- Pépé et sa guitare photographed in Montreal, Quebec, Canada at Verre Bouteille.

Background information
- Born: Philippe Proulx; 1978 (age 47–48); Saint-Basile-de-Portneuf, Quebec, Canada
- Occupation: Instrumentalist
- Instruments: Guitar, ukulele, piano
- Website: www.pepeetsaguitare.com

Philippe Proulx is a musician from Quebec. He records under the name Pépé et sa guitare (Pépé and His Guitar). On his albums, he accompanies himself on the guitar or the ukulele. In concert, he plays with a varied group of musicians under the name Pépé et son orchestre (Pépé and His Orchestra).

== Biography ==
Philippe Proulx was born in 1978 in Saint-Basile-de-Portneuf. He started playing piano at age 4, and began the guitar at 11. He became well known after winning a series of music prizes: Best New Artist, Singer-songwriter at the Festival en Chanson de Petite-Vallée, 2003; Découverte de la chanson de Magog, 2003 (site in French); and second prize at Cégep en spectacle in Jonquière, 2002. He has played in the Fringante Caravane with Les Cowboys Fringants, Loco Locass and other popular québécois artists. His height is 5"11.

Philippe Proulx is also a member of the group Flying Vomit.

He currently lives in Gentilly, Quebec.

== Discography ==
- Pépé et sa guitare 2003
- Fakek' choz 2005
- 100 % BOEUF 2007
- Pépé Goes Français 2009
- Le Véritable Amour 2011
- Engagé 2013
- Tout l'monde veut jouer avec Pépé 2016
