= Bécancour, Quebec (community) =

Coordinates: 46°20′37.9″N 72°25′54.8″W

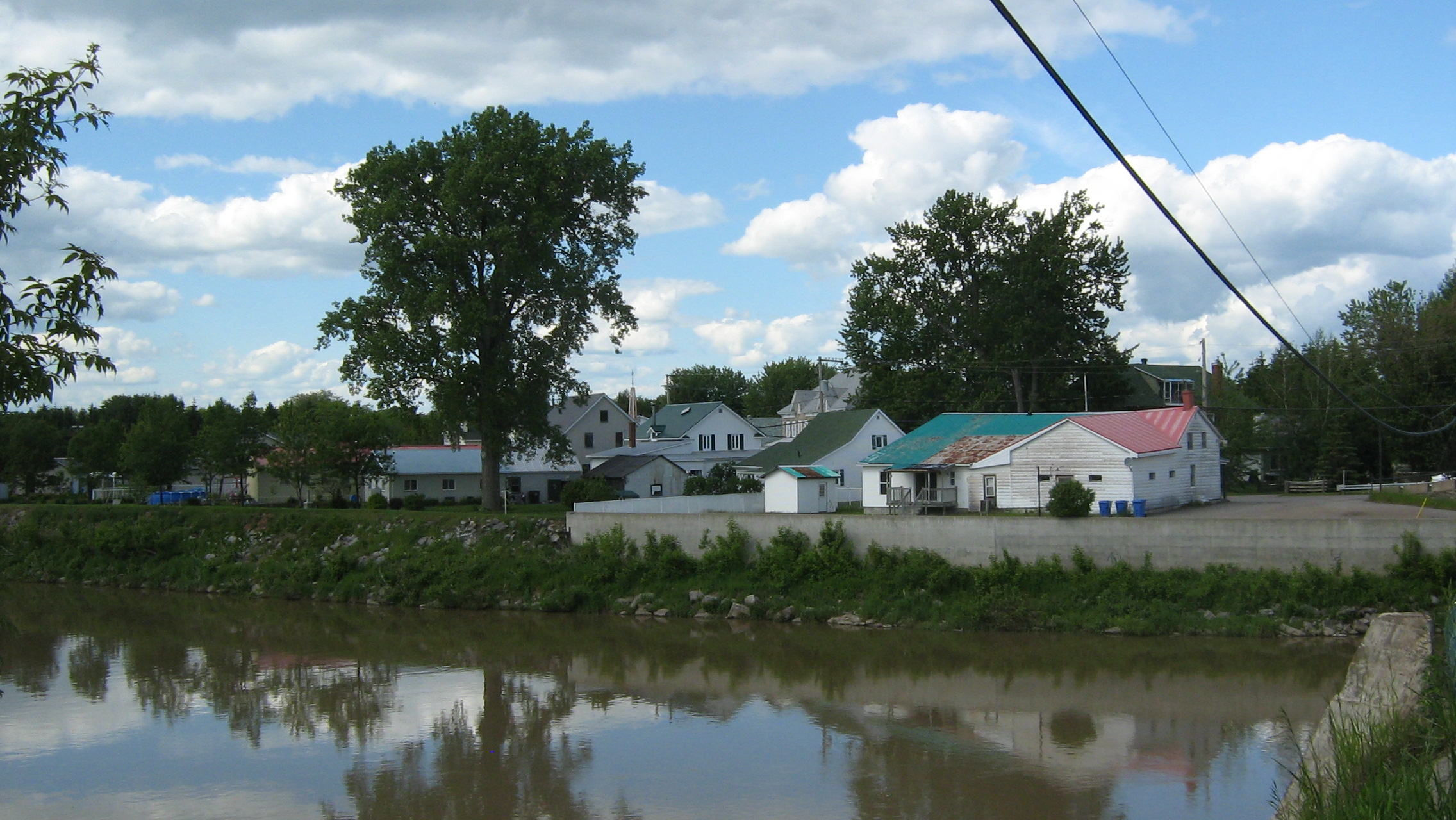
Village Bécancour

Bécancour (French pronunciation: [bekɑ̃kuʁ]) is a community of the city of Bécancour, Quebec, Canada. It is one of the major population centres within the city. It is home to Quebec's only nuclear power generator. The Indian reserve of Wôlinak lies within its geographical limits.
