= Gentilly South-West River =

River in Centre-du-Québec, Quebec (Canada)

- Location within Quebec
- Native name: Rivière Gentilly Sud-Ouest (French)

Location
- Country: Canada
- Province: Quebec
- Region: Centre-du-Québec
- MRC: Bécancour Regional County Municipality

Physical characteristics
- Source: Agricultural streams
  - location: Saint-Sylvère
  - coordinates: 46.21951°N 72.256555°W
  - elevation: 81 metres (266 ft)
- Mouth: Gentilly River (Quebec)
  - location: Bécancour
  - coordinates: 46.36167°N 72.31944°W
  - elevation: 11 metres (36 ft)
- Length: 25 kilometres (16 mi)

Basin features
- River system: Gentilly River (Quebec), St. Lawrence River
- Tributaries
  - left: (upstream) rivière de Grand-Saint-Louis, ruisseau Deshaies-Cormier, ruisseau Alphonse, ruisseau Alphonse-Deshaies.
  - right: (upstream) ruisseau Leblanc, cours d'eau Ernest-Provencher, ruisseau Oscar-Provencher, ruisseau Désilets, ruisseau David-Lacourse, ruisseau Émilien-Leblanc.

The Gentilly South-West River (in French: rivière Gentilly Sud-Ouest) is a tributary of the Gentilly River which flows on the south shore of the St. Lawrence River.

The Gentilly Sud-Ouest river flows in the territory of the municipality of Saint-Sylvère and the town of Bécancour, in the MRC of Bécancour Regional County Municipality, in the administrative region of Centre-du-Québec, in Québec, in Canada.

== Geography ==
The main neighboring hydrographic slopes of the Gentilly Sud-Ouest river are:

- north side: Gentilly River, St. Lawrence River;
- east side: Gentilly River;
- south side: Poulet stream, Bécancour River;
- west side: Grand-Saint-Louis River, Bécancour River.

The Gentilly Sud-Ouest river draws its source in an agricultural zone, from the confluence of two streams, in the eighth rang of Saint-Sylvère. This area is located north of the Bécancour River, 7 kilometres (4.3 mi) southwest of the village of Saint-Sylvère and northeast of the village of Saint-Wenceslas.

From its head area, the Gentilly Sud-Ouest River flows with a drop of 70 metres (230 ft) over 25.0 kilometres (15.5 mi) in the following segments:

- 1.0 kilometre (0.62 mi) to the southwest in an agricultural zone;
- 2.7 kilometres (1.7 mi) north, to the sixth rang road;
- 2.1 kilometres (1.3 mi) north, to the limit between Saint-Sylvère and Bécancour;
- 2.3 kilometres (1.4 mi) north, to Chemin des Cerisiers;
- 2.1 kilometres (1.3 mi) north to Chemin des Hêtres;
- 1.7 kilometres (1.1 mi) north, to the road;
- 6.0 kilometres (3.7 mi) north, winding up to Route des Ormes;
- 3.0 kilometres (1.9 mi) north, winding up to Boulevard du Parc-Industriel;
- 4.1 kilometres (2.5 mi) (or 2.6 kilometres (1.6 mi) in a direct line) north, winding up to its mouth.

The Sud-Ouest Gentilly River flows onto the west bank of the Gentilly River, in Bécancour.

== Toponymy ==
The toponym “rivière Gentilly Sud-Ouest” was made official on December 5, 1968, at the Commission de toponymie du Québec.

== See also ==
- List of rivers of Quebec
