= Quebec Route 162 =

Highway in Quebec, Canada

Route 162

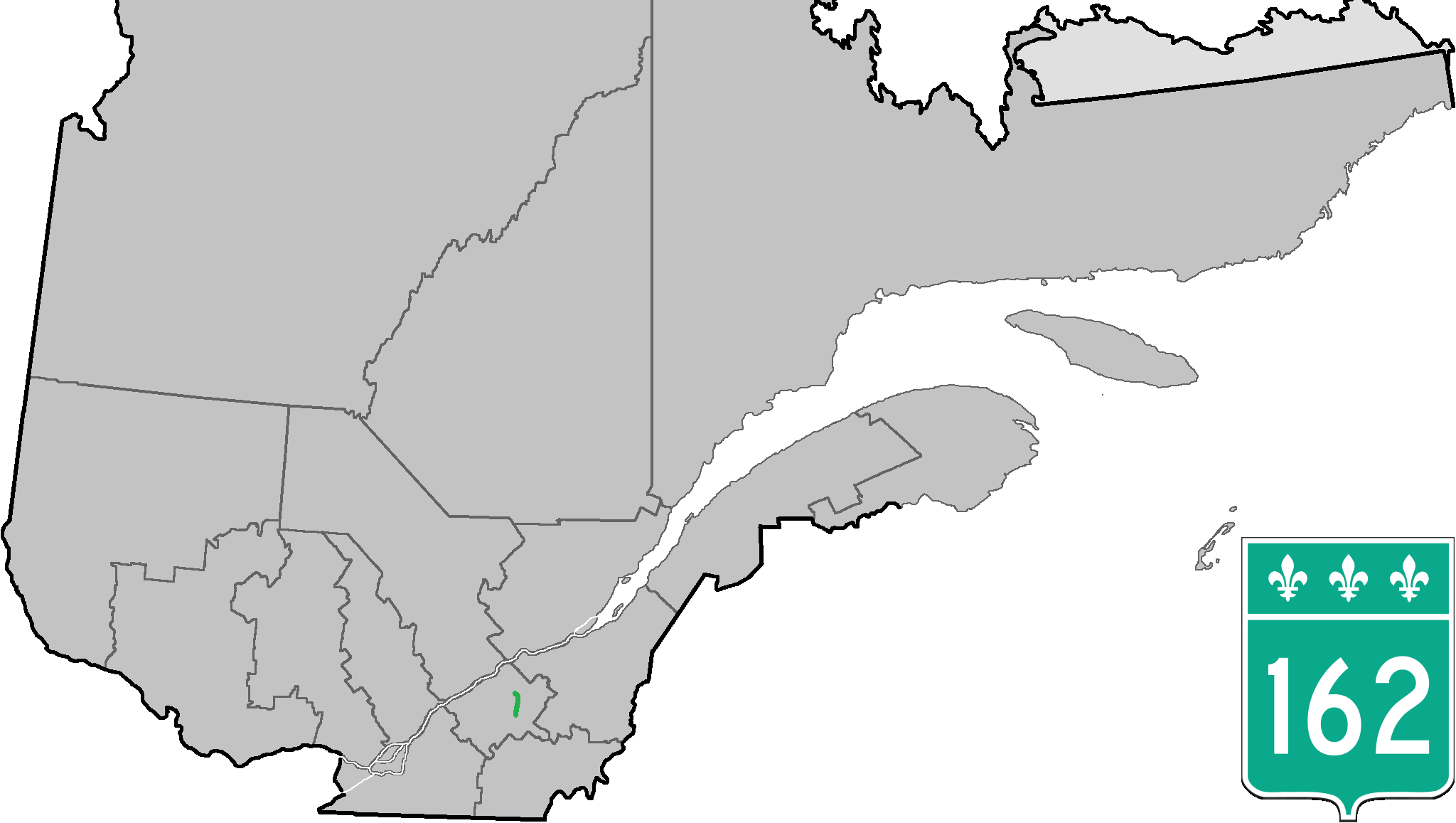

Route information
- Maintained by Transports Québec
- Length: 23.9 km (14.9 mi)

Major junctions
- South end: R-122 / R-161 in Victoriaville
- R-165 / R-263 in Saint-Louis-de-Blandford
- North end: A-20 (TCH) in Saint-Louis-de-Blandford

Location
- Country: Canada
- Province: Quebec
- Major cities: Victoriaville

Highway system
- Quebec provincial highways; Autoroutes; List; Former
← R-161	→ R-165

Route 162 is a short 24 km highway on the south shore of the St. Lawrence River in Quebec, Canada, linking Autoroute 20 in Saint-Louis-de-Blandford and Victoriaville, at the junction of Route 122.

== Municipalities along Route 162 ==
- Victoriaville
- Saint-Rosaire
- Saint-Louis-de-Blandford

== See also ==
- List of Quebec provincial highways
