= Sainte-Cécile-de-Lévrard =

- Parish municipality
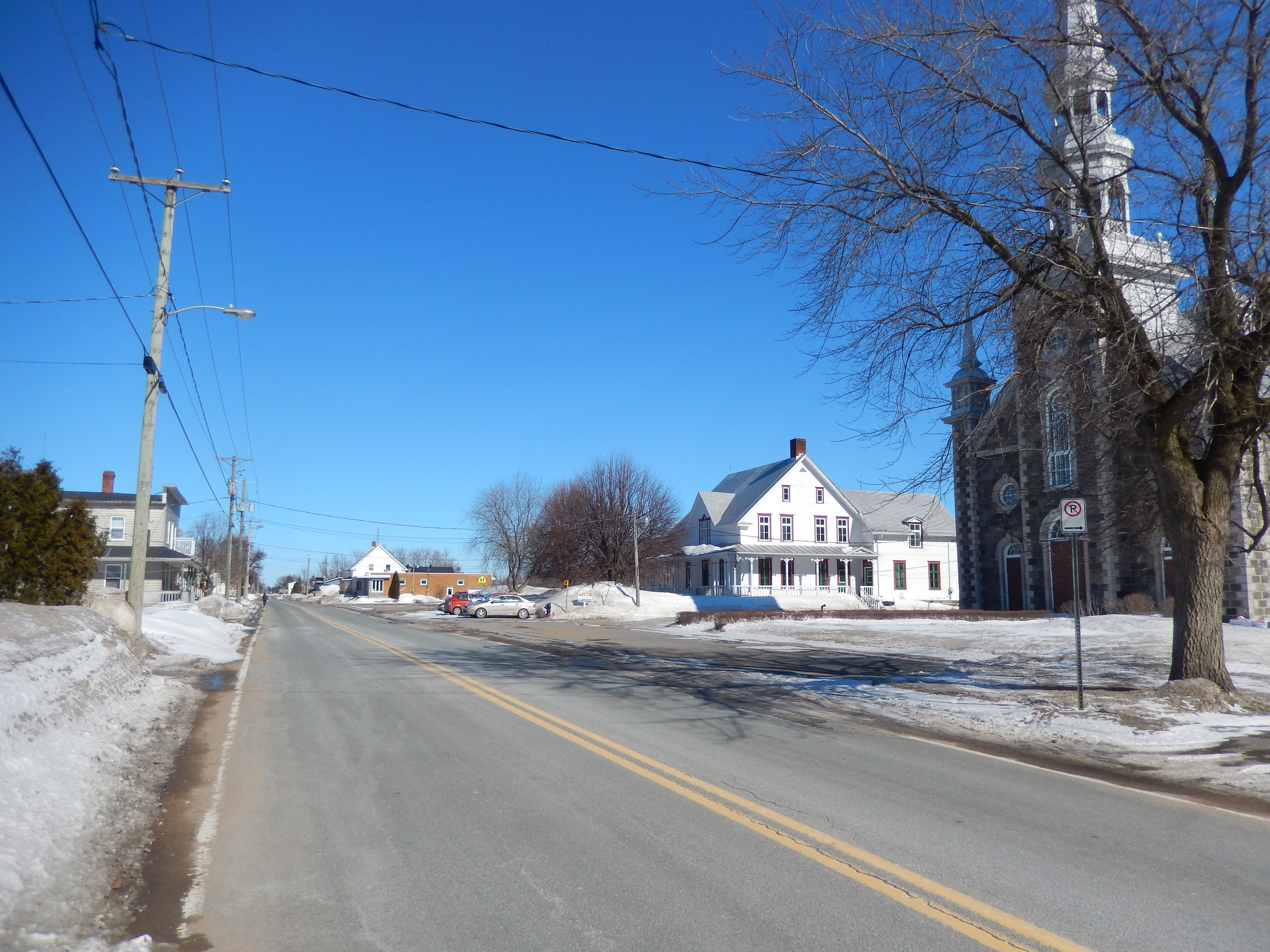

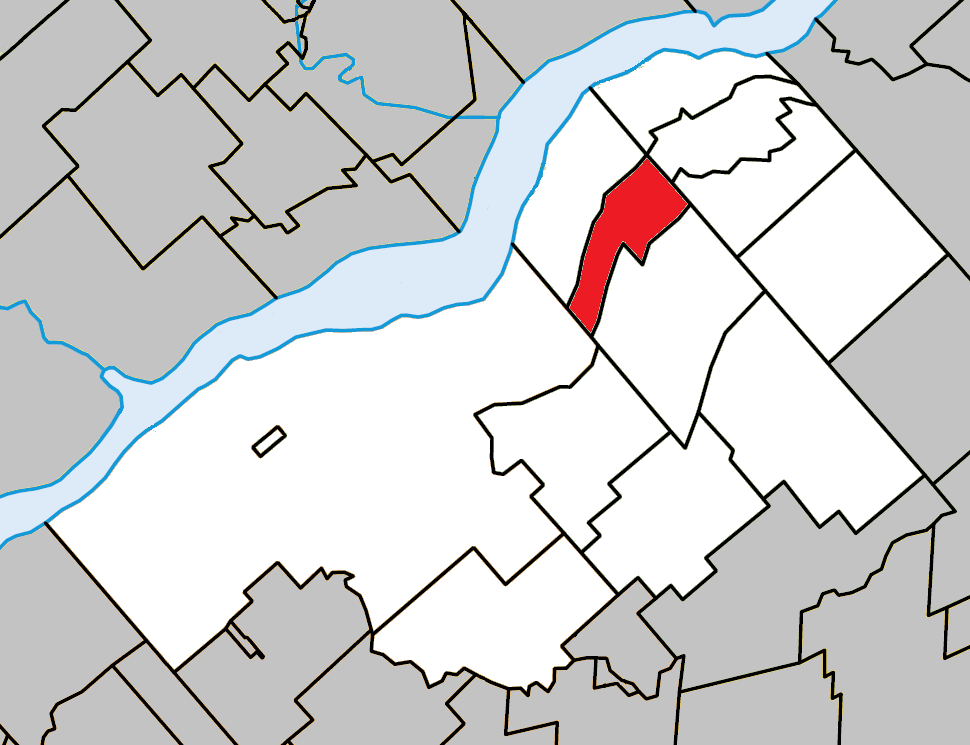
- Location within Bécancour RCM

- Location in southern Quebec
- Coordinates: 46°28′N 72°10′W
- Country: Canada
- Province: Quebec
- Region: Centre-du-Québec
- RCM: Bécancour
- Constituted: September 11, 1908

Government
  - Mayor: Simon Brunelle
  - Federal riding: Bécancour—Nicolet—Saurel—Alnôbak
  - Prov. riding: Nicolet-Bécancour

Area (2021)
  - Total: 32.20 km^{2} (12.43 sq mi)
  - Land: 32.32 km^{2} (12.48 sq mi)
- There is an apparent contradiction between two authoritative sources

Population (2021)
  - Total: 349
  - Density: 10.8/km^{2} (28/sq mi)
  - Pop 2016-2021: ▼6.2%
  - Dwellings: 163
- Time zone: UTC−05:00 (EST)
  - Summer (DST): UTC−04:00 (EDT)
- Postal code(s): G0X 2M0
- Area code: 819
- Highways: R-218

Sainte-Cécile-de-Lévrard (French pronunciation: [sɛ̃t sesil də levʁaʁ]) is a parish municipality in the Centre-du-Québec region of the province of Quebec in Canada.

== Demographics ==
In the 2021 Canadian census conducted by Statistics Canada, Sainte-Cécile-de-Lévrard had a population of 349 living in 153 of its 163 total private dwellings, a change of −6.2% from its 2016 population of 372. With a land area of 32.32 km^{2} (12.48 sq mi), it had a population density of 10.8/km^{2} (28.0/sq mi) in 2021.

== See also ==
- List of parish municipalities in Quebec
