= Quebec Route 263 =

Highway in Quebec, Canada

Route 263

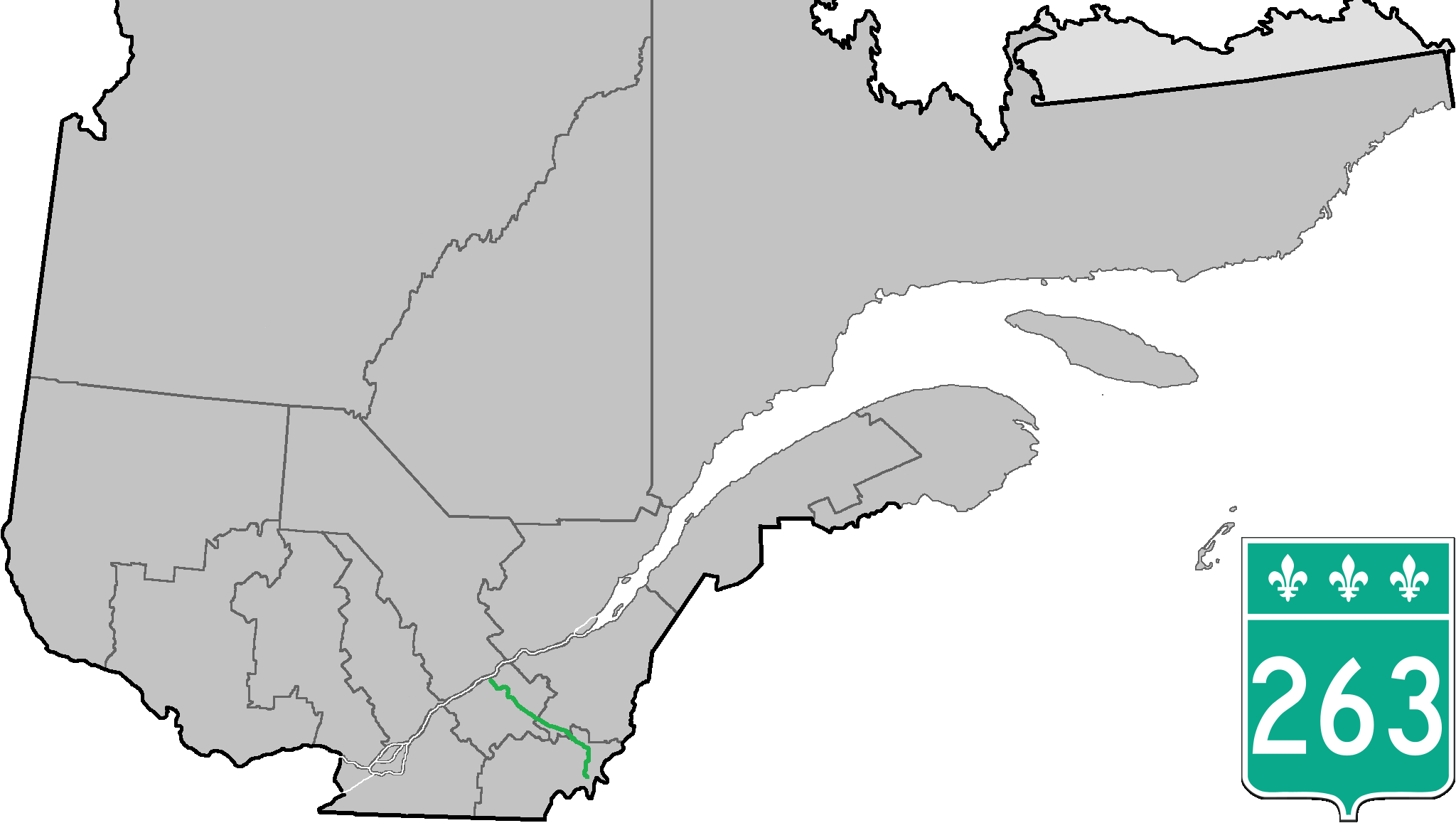

Route information
- Length: 220 km (140 mi)

Major junctions
- South end: R-161 in Saint-Augustin-de-Woburn
- R-161 in Saint-Augustin-de-Woburn & Marston; R-108 in Lambton; R-112 in Disraeli; R-216 in Saint-Fortunat; R-116 / R-165 in Princeville; R-162 in Sait-Rosaire; A-20 (TCH) in Saint-Louis-de-Blanford; R-226 in Sainte-Marie-de-Blandford; R-132 east of Becancour
- North end: R-132 east of Becancour

Location
- Country: Canada
- Province: Quebec
- Major cities: Disraeli, Princeville

Highway system
- Quebec provincial highways; Autoroutes; List; Former
← R-261	→ R-265

Route 263 is a two-lane north/south highway on the south shore of the Saint Lawrence River in Quebec, Canada. Its northern terminus is in the city of Bécancour at the junction of Route 132, and the southern terminus is at the junction of Route 161 close to Saint-Augustin-de-Woburn.

== List of towns along Route 263 ==
- Sainte-Marie-de-Blandford
- Lemieux
- Saint-Louis-de-Blandford
- Princeville
- Saint-Norbert-d'Arthabaska
- Sainte-Hélène-de-Chester
- Saint-Fortunat
- Saint-Jacques-le-Majeur-de-Wolfestown
- Disraeli
- Sainte-Praxède
- Saint-Romain
- Lambton
- Saint-Sébastien
- Sainte-Cécile-de-Whitton
- Marston
- Piopolis
- Saint-Augustin-de-Woburn
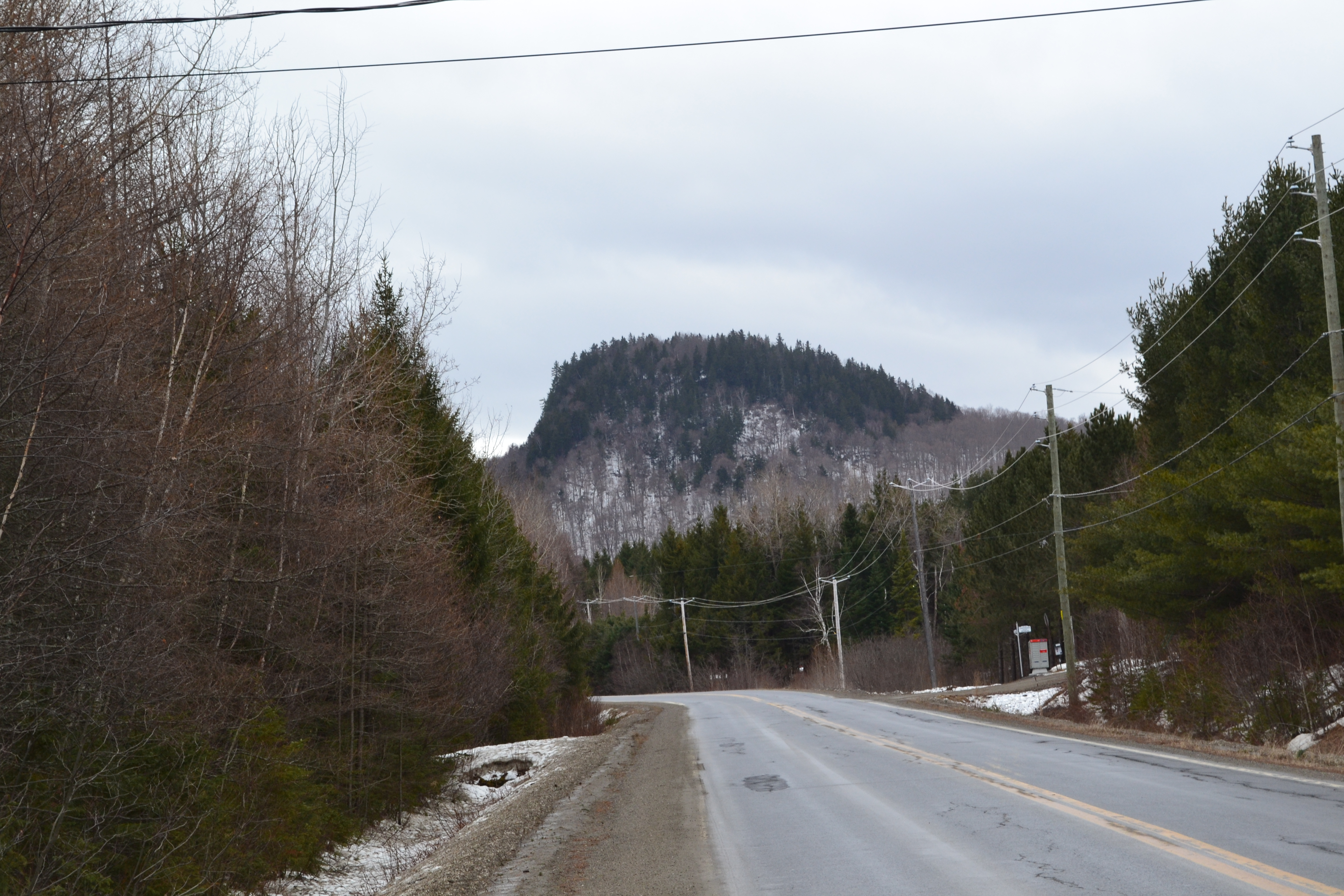
View over Scotch Cap summit between Saint-Augustin-de-Woburn and Piopolis.

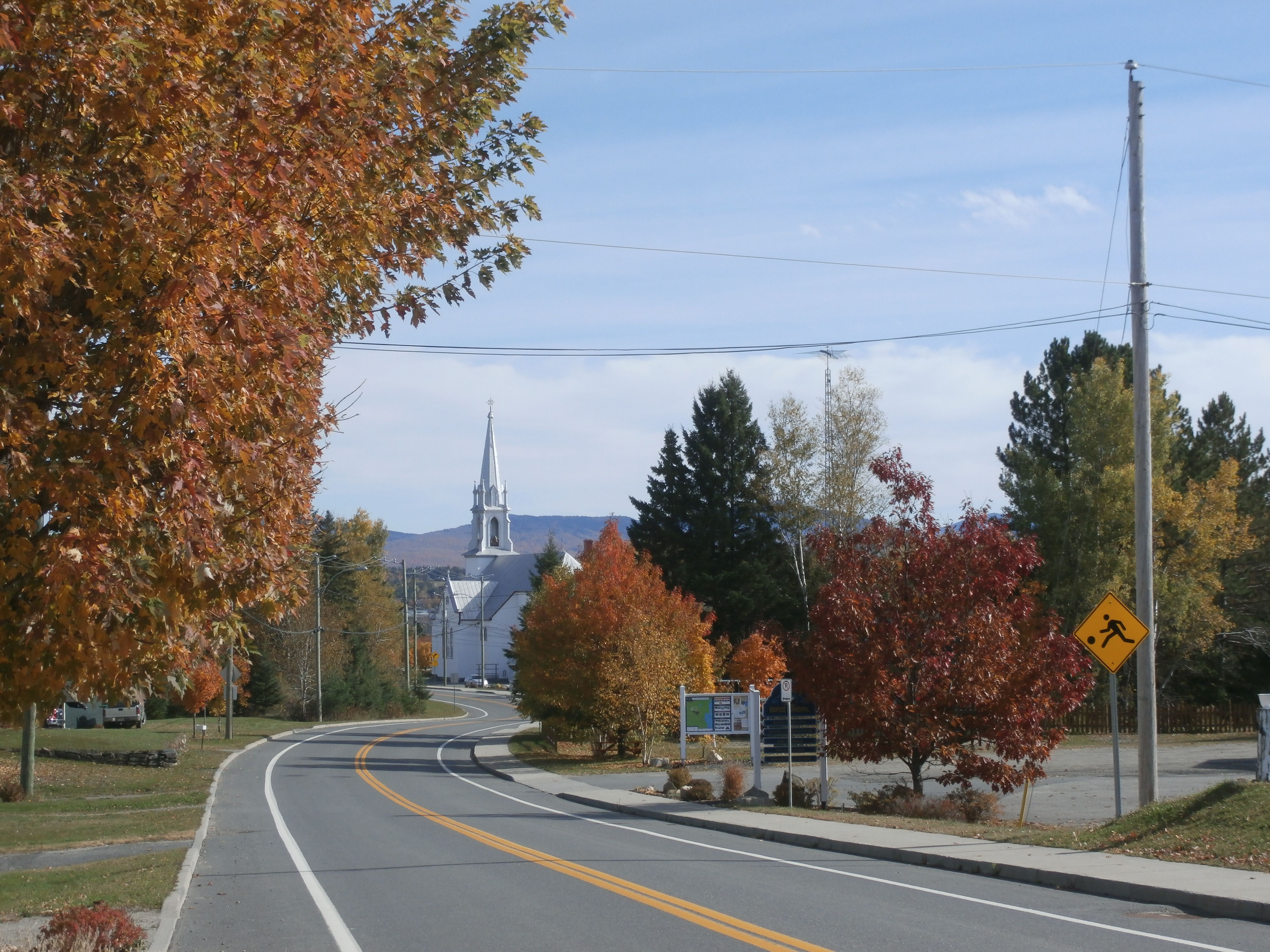
In Piopolis.

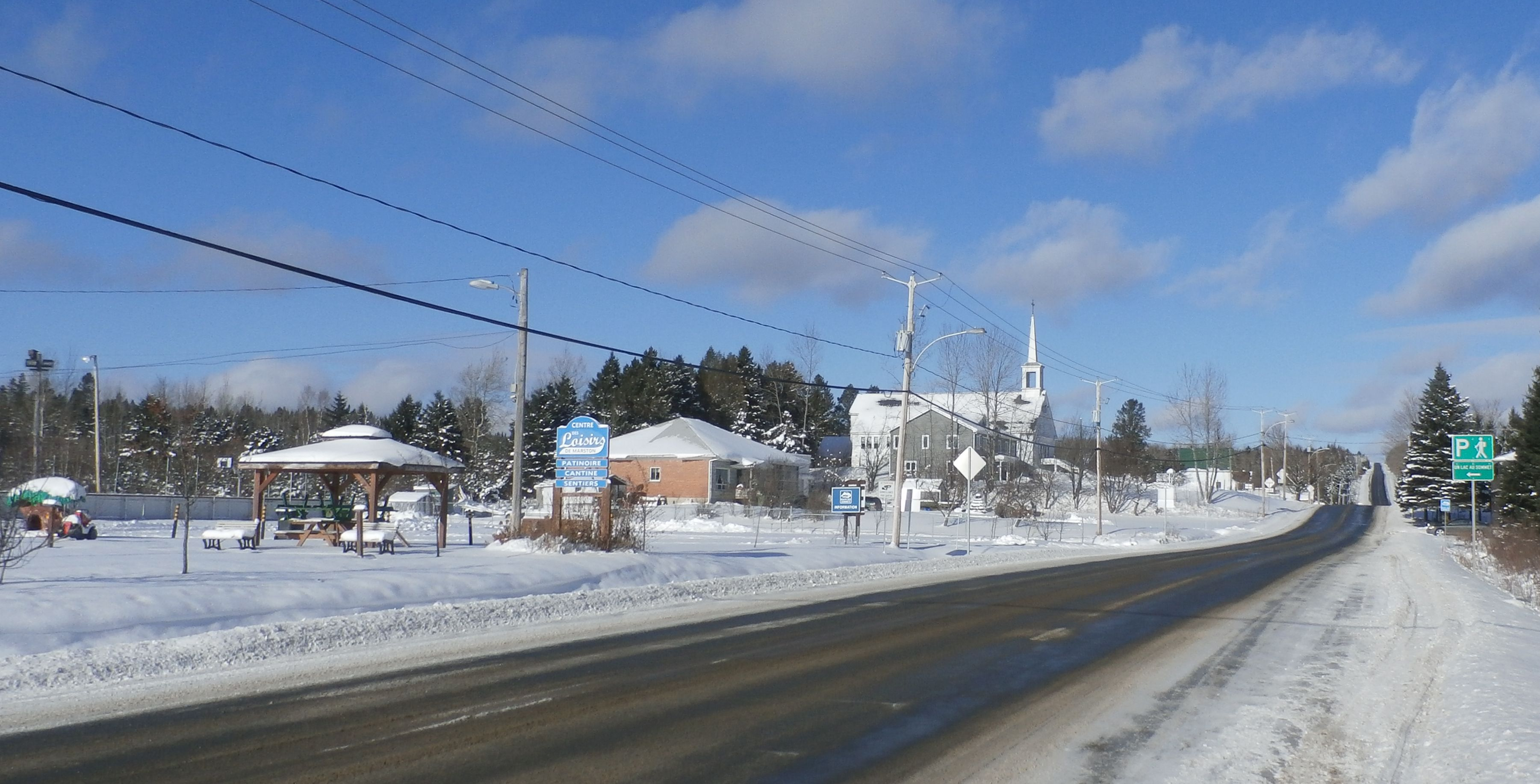
In Marston.

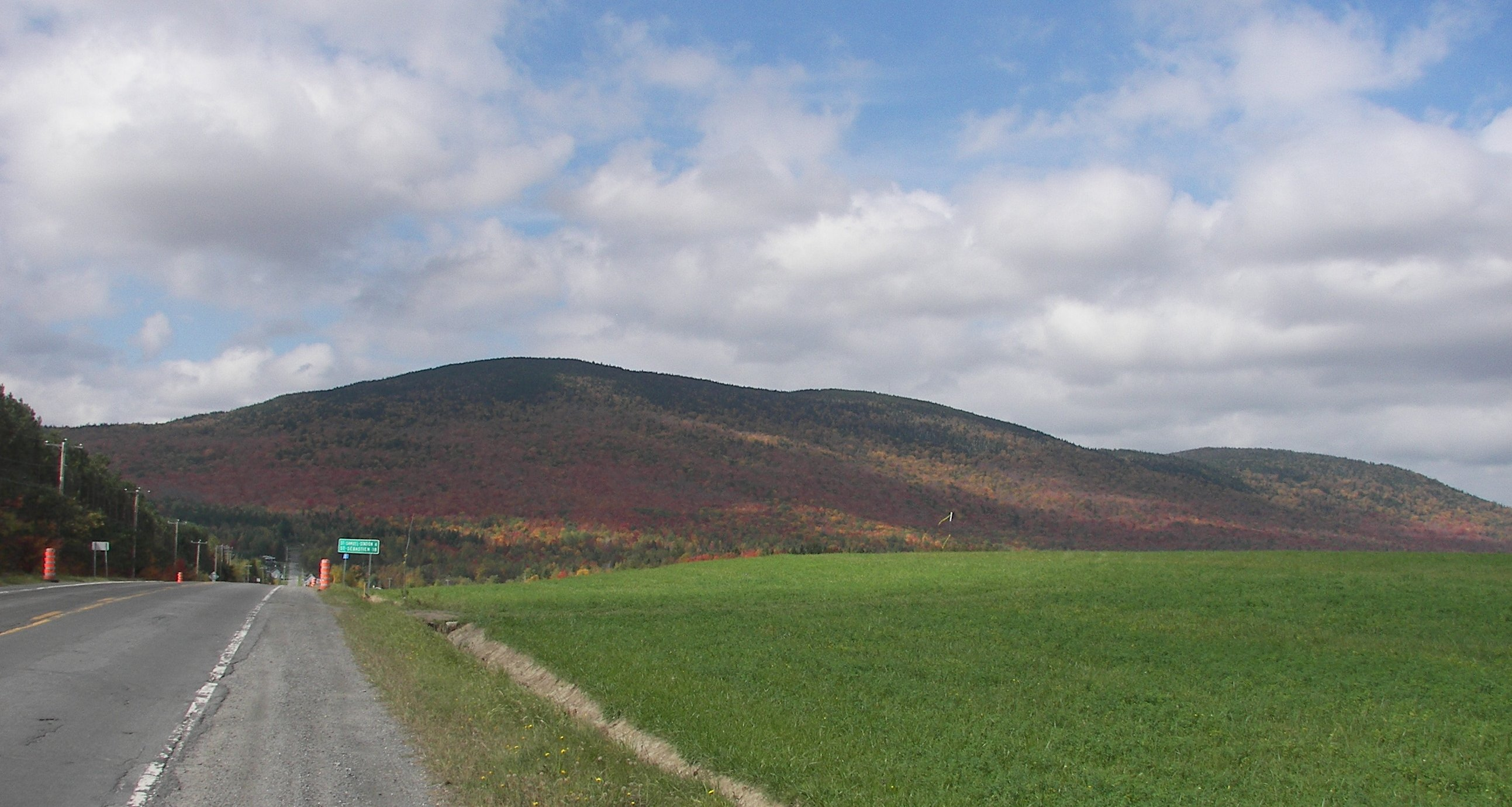
Mont Sainte-Cécile in Sainte-Cécile-de-Whitton.

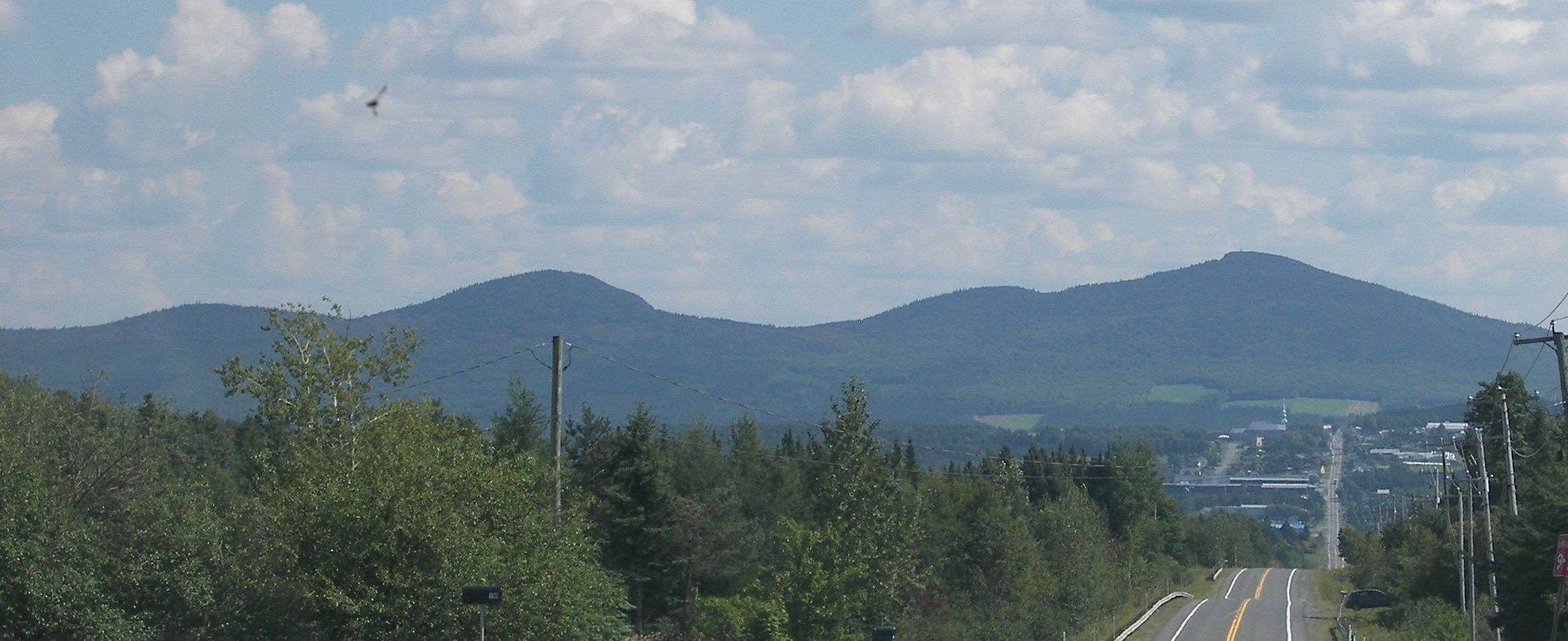
Morne de Saint-Sébastien in Saint-Sébastien.

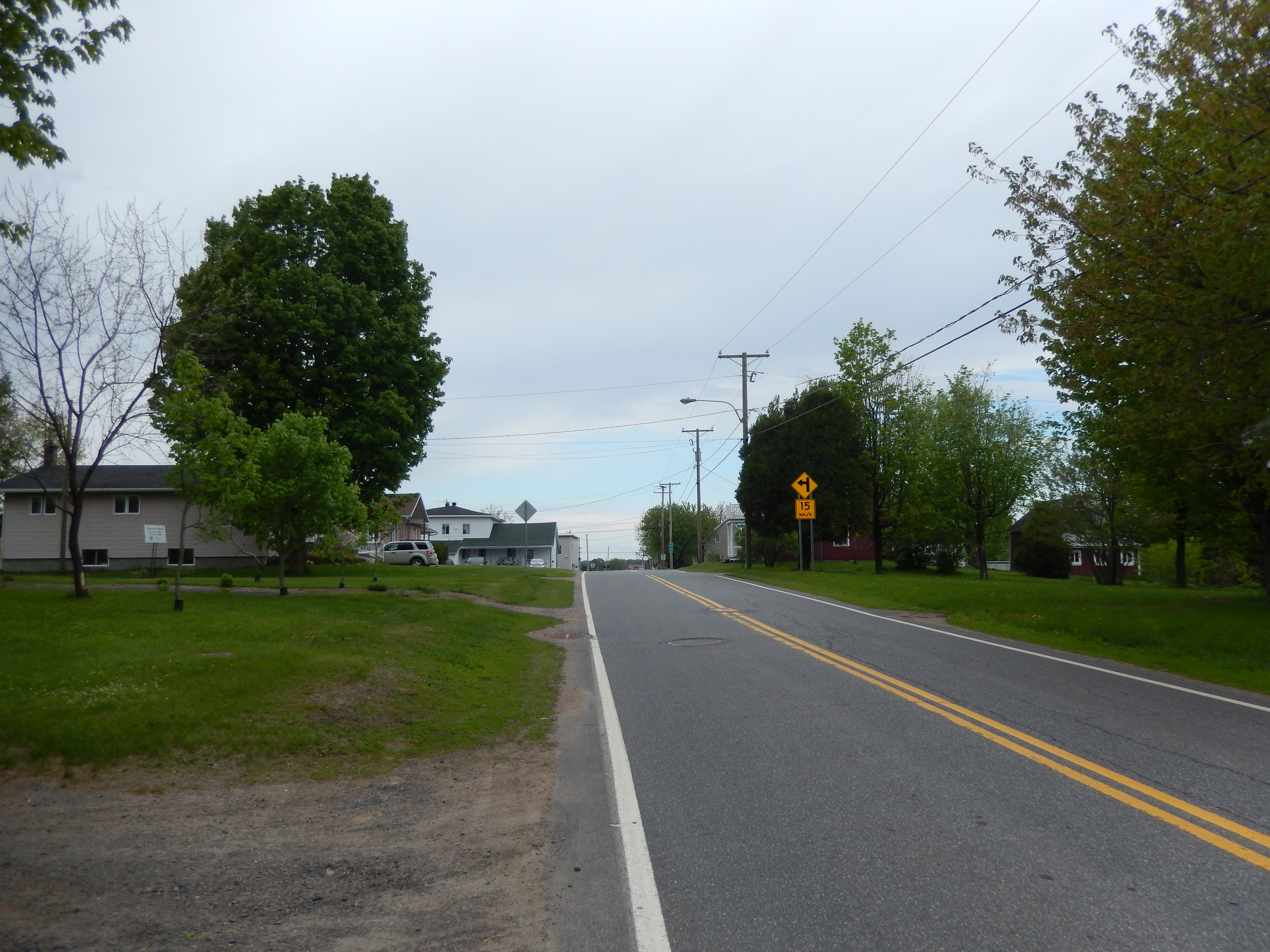
Entering Lemieux.

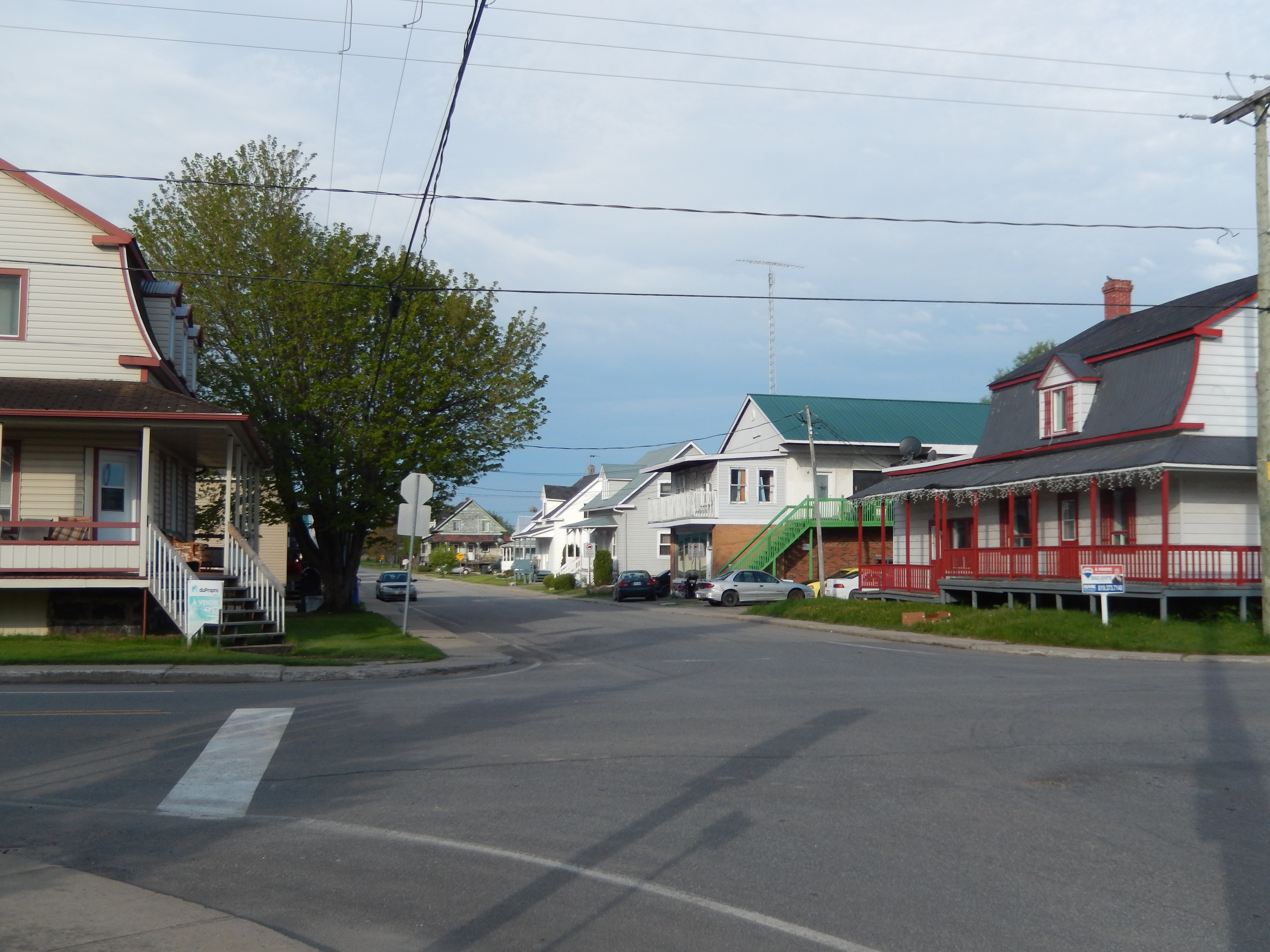
Junction with Quebec Route 226 in Sainte-Marie-de-Blandford.

== See also ==
- List of Quebec provincial highways
