= Sainte-Gertrude, Quebec =

Coordinates: 46°18′00″N 72°16′28″W

Sainte-Gertrude (French pronunciation: [sɛ̃t ʒɛʁtʁyd]) is a community of the city of Bécancour, Quebec.
