= Saint-Sylvère =

- Municipality
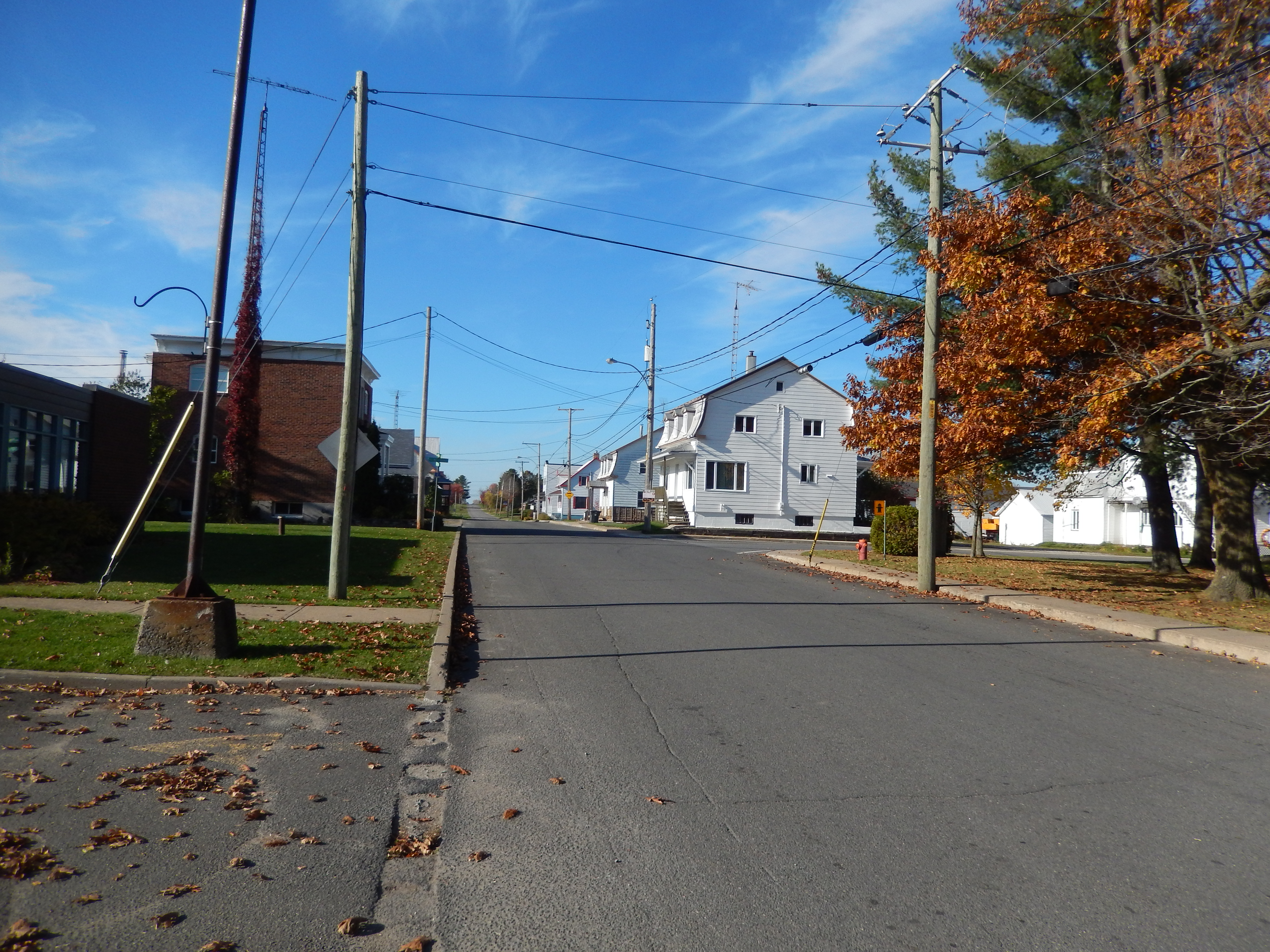

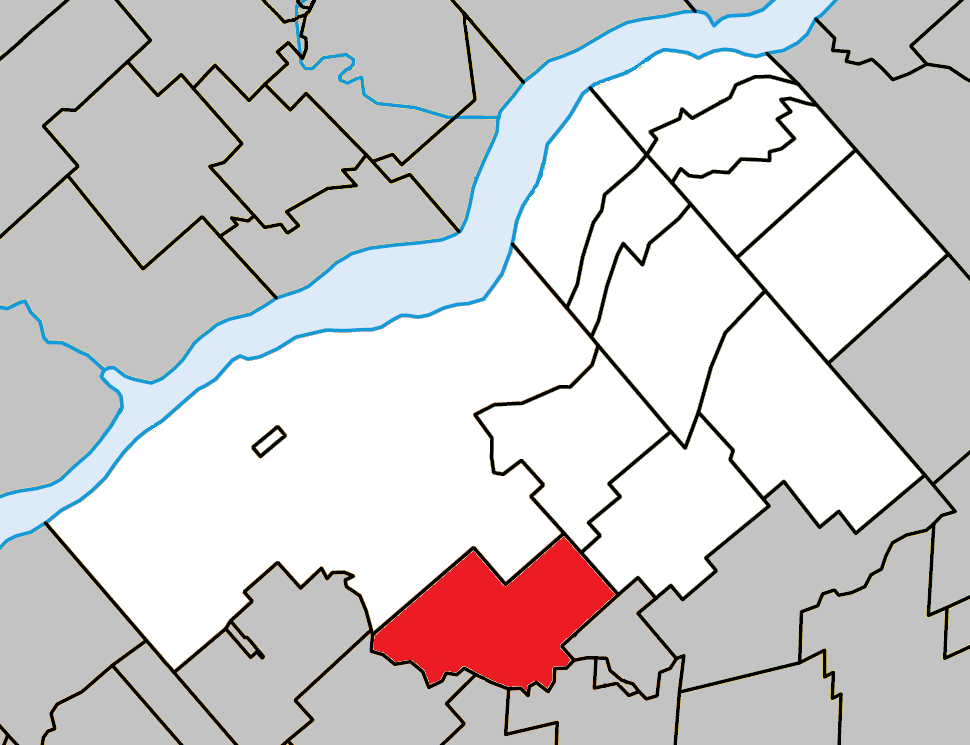
- Location within Bécancour RCM.

- Location in southern Quebec.
- Coordinates: 46°14′N 72°13′W
- Country: Canada
- Province: Quebec
- Region: Centre-du-Québec
- RCM: Bécancour
- Constituted: September 18, 1976

Government
  - Mayor: Fannie Boisvert
  - Federal riding: Bécancour—Nicolet—Saurel—Alnôbak
  - Prov. riding: Nicolet-Bécancour

Area
  - Total: 87.00 km^{2} (33.59 sq mi)
  - Land: 86.30 km^{2} (33.32 sq mi)

Population (2021)
  - Total: 786
  - Density: 9.1/km^{2} (24/sq mi)
  - Pop 2016-2021: ▼0.6%
  - Dwellings: 367
- Time zone: UTC−5 (EST)
  - Summer (DST): UTC−4 (EDT)
- Postal code(s): G0Z 1H0
- Area code: 819
- Highways: R-261
- Website: www.saint-sylvere.ca

Saint-Sylvère (French pronunciation: [sɛ̃ silvɛʁ]) is a municipality in the Centre-du-Québec region of the province of Quebec in Canada.

== See also ==
- List of municipalities in Quebec
