= Gentilly River (Quebec) =

River in Centre-du-Québec, Quebec (Canada)

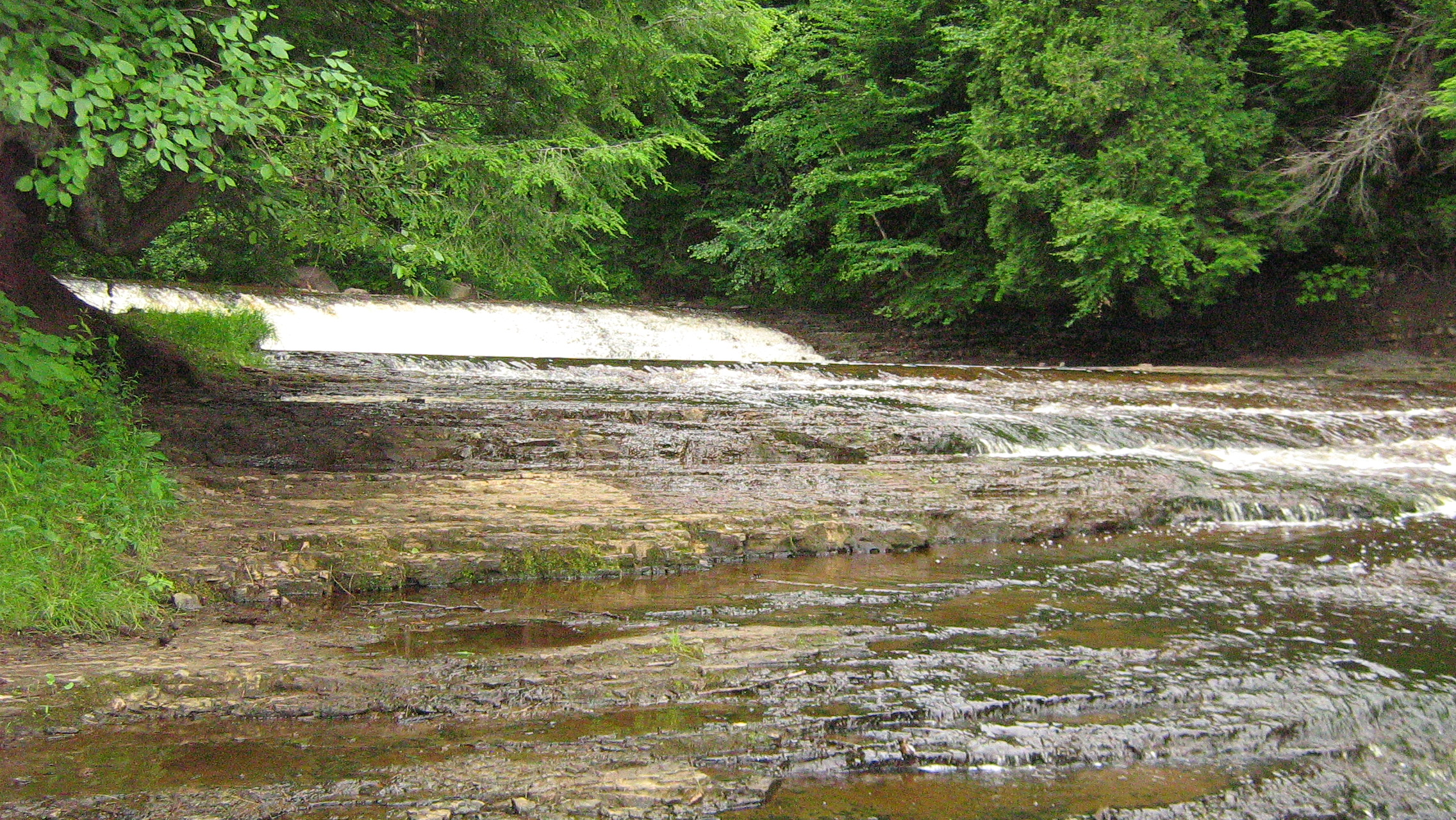
- Thibodeau Falls in the Rivière-Gentilly Regional Park (Parc de la Rivière-Gentilly).

- Location within Quebec

Location
- Country: Canada
- Province: Quebec
- Region: Centre-du-Québec
- MRC: Arthabaska Regional County Municipality and Bécancour Regional County Municipality

Physical characteristics
- Source: Tourbière à Lemieux
  - location: Lemieux
  - coordinates: 46.316525°N 71.980963°W
  - elevation: 110 metres (360 ft)
- Mouth: St. Lawrence River
  - location: Bécancour
  - coordinates: 46.398611°N 72.343888°W
  - elevation: 5 metres (16 ft)
- Length: 34.7 kilometres (21.6 mi)

Basin features
- Progression: St. Lawrence River
- Tributaries
  - left: (upstream) Rheault stream, Gentilly South-West River, Lapierre stream, Le Bras stream, Ricard stream, Sauvage River, Larivière stream, Lainesse stream, Sévigny stream, stream Arel
  - right: (upstream) Lemarier stream, Beaudet River, Goudreau-Martel stream, Martel stream, Côté stream, Arpin stream, Jutras stream, Grenier stream

The Gentilly River (in French: rivière Gentilly) is a tributary of the south shore of the St. Lawrence River, in the administrative region of Centre-du-Québec, in Quebec, in Canada.

This river flows through the regional county municipalities (MRC) of:

- Arthabaska Regional County Municipality: municipality of Saint-Louis-de-Blandford
- Bécancour Regional County Municipality: municipalities of Manseau, Lemieux, Sainte-Marie-de-Blandford and Bécancour (city).

== Toponymy ==
The river was originally known as the "Little Stinking River" in the 17th century. The use continued during the first half of the 18th century. The adjective "petite" refers to the Bécancour River, which was originally referred to as the "(Great) Puante River".

In his "History and General Description of New France", Pierre-François-Xavier de Charlevoix gives three hypotheses for the origin of the name of the river. The first simply alludes to the smell of water. The second would be the great presence of muskrats, which the Amerindians cannot bear the smell of. As for the third, he could allude to a battle between the Algonquins and the Iroquois near the river, whose rotting bodies would have remained in place for a long time.

As for "Gentilly", it appeared on a notice of enumeration of 1734. The name became widespread on maps from 1763. The name refers to the seigneury of Gentilly, granted to Michel Pelletier de La Prade in 1676.

== Geography ==
The Gentilly River has its source in a swampy area in Lemieux. It then crosses Soulard Lake and then takes a northwesterly direction to flow into the St. Lawrence River at Bécancour, eight kilometers west of Gentilly. On its course, the river only encountered one obstacle, the Thibodeau Falls, two meters high. Its main tributary is the Gentilly South-West River, which itself has a length of 31.7 kilometres (19.7 mi).

Its total length is 55.9 kilometres (34.7 mi) with a drop of 105 metres (344 ft) and its watershed is 318.7 kilometres (198.03 mi).

The flow of the river was calculated from an active hydrological station from 1972 to 1978. The latter gives the river an average flow of 3.6 cubic metres per second (130 cu ft/s) with a flood maximum of 91.2 cubic metres per second (3,220 cu ft/s) and a low water at 0.3 cubic metres per second (11 cu ft/s).

== Main attractions ==
The "Parc régional de la Rivière-Gentilly" (Rivière-Gentilly Regional Park) offers various services and infrastructures for recreational and sports activities. This park, which is located on the banks of the Gentilly River, straddles the territory of Sainte-Marie-de-Blandford and Bécancour.

== See also ==
- List of rivers of Quebec
