= Saint-Louis-de-Blandford =

- Municipality

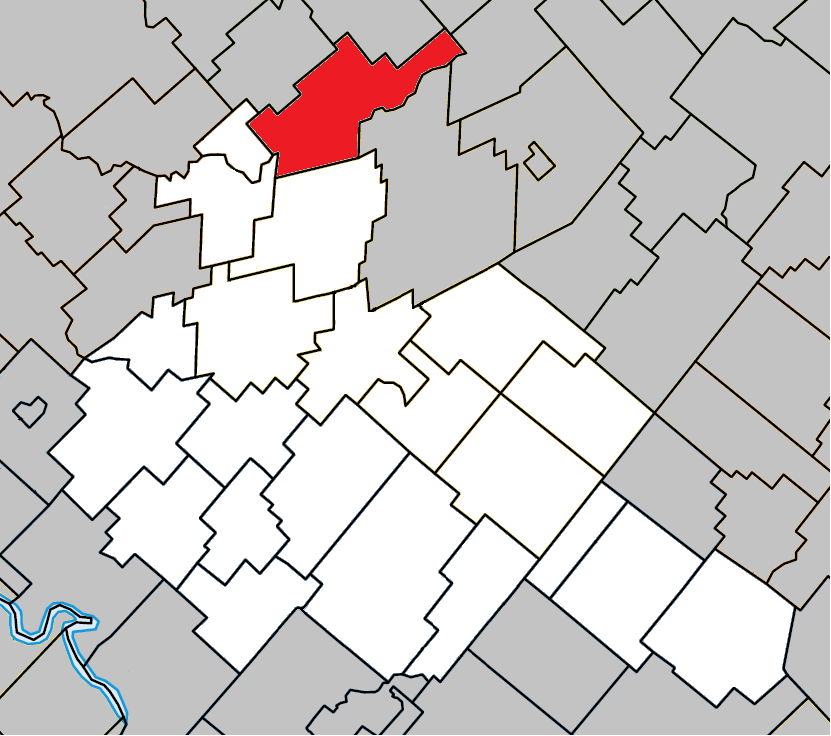
- Location within Arthabaska RCM.

- Location in southern Quebec.
- Coordinates: 46°15′N 72°00′W
- Country: Canada
- Province: Quebec
- Region: Centre-du-Québec
- RCM: Arthabaska
- Constituted: July 1, 1855

Government
  - Mayor: Élisabeth Hamel
  - Federal riding: Richmond—Arthabaska—des-Sources
  - Prov. riding: Nicolet-Bécancour

Area
  - Total: 107.20 km^{2} (41.39 sq mi)
  - Land: 104.36 km^{2} (40.29 sq mi)

Population (2021)
  - Total: 1,076
  - Density: 10.3/km^{2} (27/sq mi)
  - Pop 2016-2021: ▲6.4%
  - Dwellings: 583
- Time zone: UTC−5 (EST)
  - Summer (DST): UTC−4 (EDT)
- Postal code(s): G0Z 1B0
- Area code: 819
- Highways A-20 (TCH): R-162; R-165; R-263
- Website: www.saint-louis -de-blandford.ca

Saint-Louis-de-Blandford (French pronunciation: [sɛ̃t lwi də blɛn(d)fɚd, -fœʁd]) is a small town north east of Montreal. Located on the Bécancour River in Arthabaska county in the Centre-du-Québec region, the town was incorporated in 1855 and has a current population of 1,076 inhabitants (Statistics Canada, 2021); this number varies seasonally, as many local residences are summer cottages.

Saint-Louis-de-Blandford is known for its high concentration of cranberry bogs; the majority of cranberry cultivation in the province of Quebec happens in and around the town. To take further advantage of this plentiful natural resource and boost the town's tourism revenue, an interpretation centre offers educational presentations and visits to local cranberry bogs for groups and interested visitors. Agritourism of this type is common in the Centre-du-Québec region, which is known as the agricultural heartland of Quebec.

St-Louis-de-Blandford is located along Autoroute 20, which links it to Montreal and Quebec City, and is also accessible via Routes 162 and 165.
