= Gentilly, Quebec =

Village in Bécancour, Quebec, Canada

Coordinates: 46°24′00″N 72°16′28″W

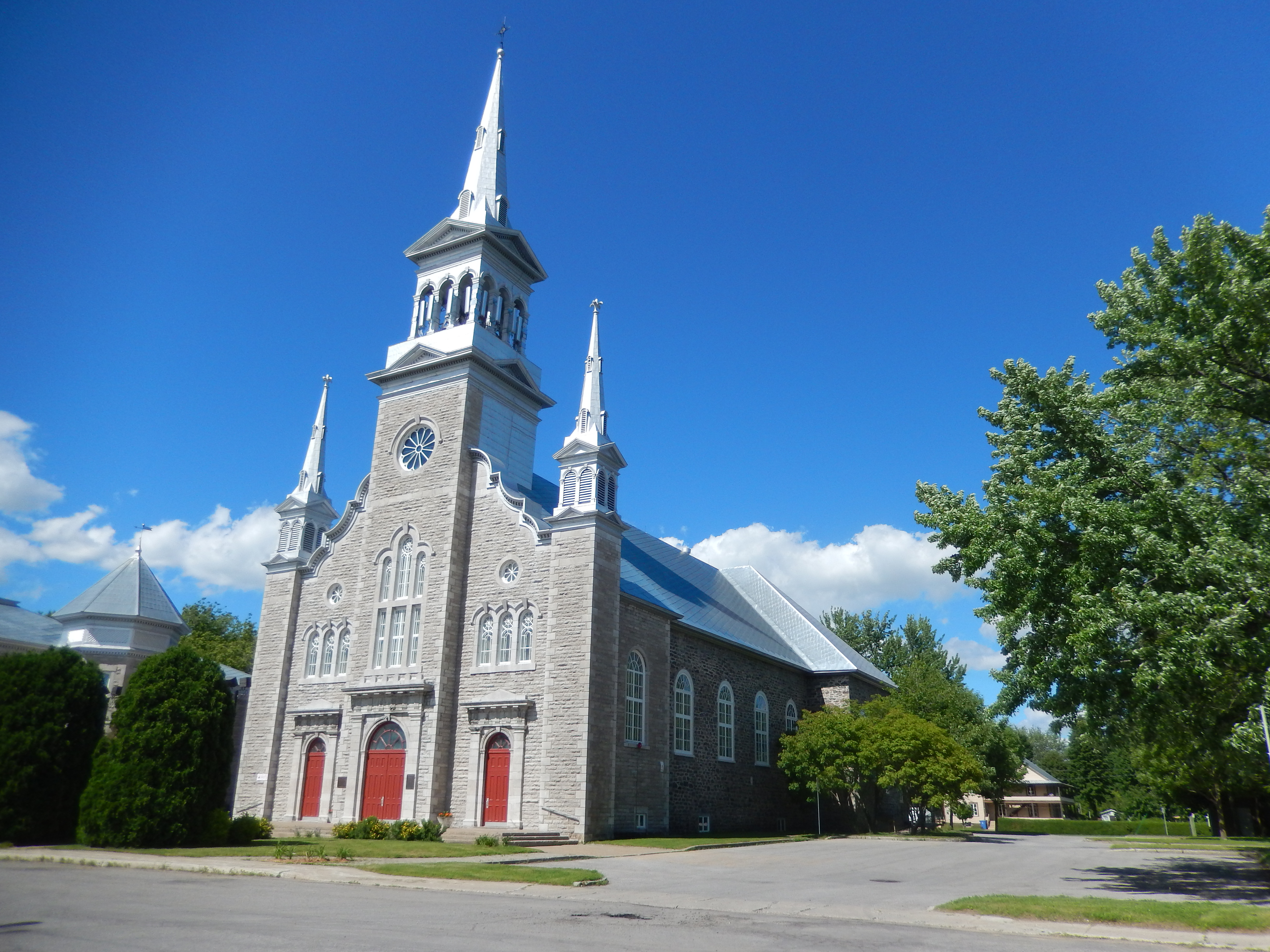
Saint-Édouard-de-Gentilly Church

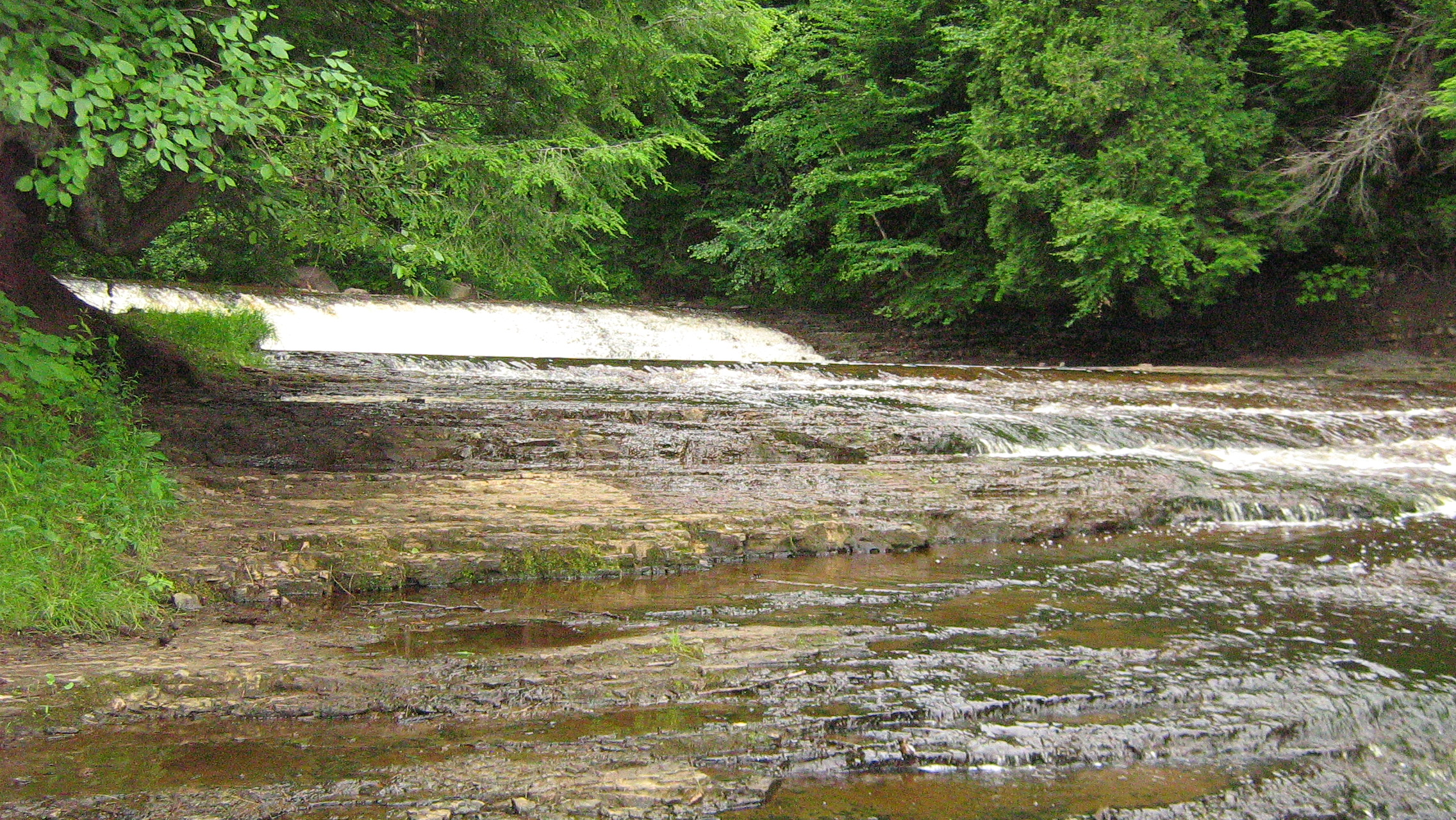
Gentilly River Falls in the Gentilly River Park

Gentilly (French pronunciation: [ʒɑ̃tiji]), known as Saint-Édouard-de-Gentilly until 1900, is a village now part of Bécancour, Quebec, Canada. It is one of the major population centres within Bécancour's extensive territory, with 1,673 inhabitants counted in Gentilly at the 2016 population census.

The village is home to a traditionally French-speaking population and hosts the famous yearly Potirothon. While Gentilly is a small town, it has all the essential services and a warm/welcoming community. The Parc Regional de la Rivière Gentilly is close to town and offers hiking, camping, mountain biking and kayaking. It is also in proximity to the Parc Industriel de Bécancour where most industries are involved in manufacturing. Among these is the Gentilly Nuclear Generating Station, decommissioned in 2012.

== History ==
In 1647 the Company of New France, or Company of One Hundred Associates (Compagnie des Cent-Associés) as it was more commonly known, sold two fiefs to Nicolas Marsolet and Pierre Lefebvre on the shores of the Saint-Lawrence River and the Gentilly River. In 1668 Pierre Lefebvre gave his fief title to his son-in-law Félix Thunès (Sieur Dufresne) who held it until 1669 when it was to Michel Pelletier (Sieur de Laprade). The same year Pelletier got Intendant Bouterouse to grant him a parcel of land bordering Nicolas Marsolet's fief. In 1671 Marsolet also sold his fief to Michel Pelletier, who now owned a parcel of land along about 10 kilometres (6.2 mi) of coastline on the Saint Lawrence and reached 8 kilometres (5.0 mi) inland. This was the land on which Gentilly would be established. In 1683, these three land concessions gained the status "seigneurie des Poissons". The Seigneurie de Gentilly was surveyed in March 1735, and the territory then became a parish in 1784. The town was named Saint-Édouard-de-Gentilly after Gentilly, Val-de-Marne, in France.

On 10 April 1900, the parish of Saint-Édouard-de-Gentilly was broken up, and the town became an independent village, taking on the shorter name of Gentilly. On 17 October 1965 Gentilly was merged into the municipality of Bécancour and has been part of it since.

== Notable people ==
- Denis Villeneuve - film director and writer
- Lucien Dubois - member of House of Commons of Canada; author of "The History of Gentilly (1935)"
- Pépé et sa Guitare - musician
- Céline Baril - artist and film director

== Demographics ==
Of the resident population, 78.3% (1 310) speak only French, and 21.7% are bilingual in French and English.
