= Lemieux, Quebec =

Lemieux
- Municipality
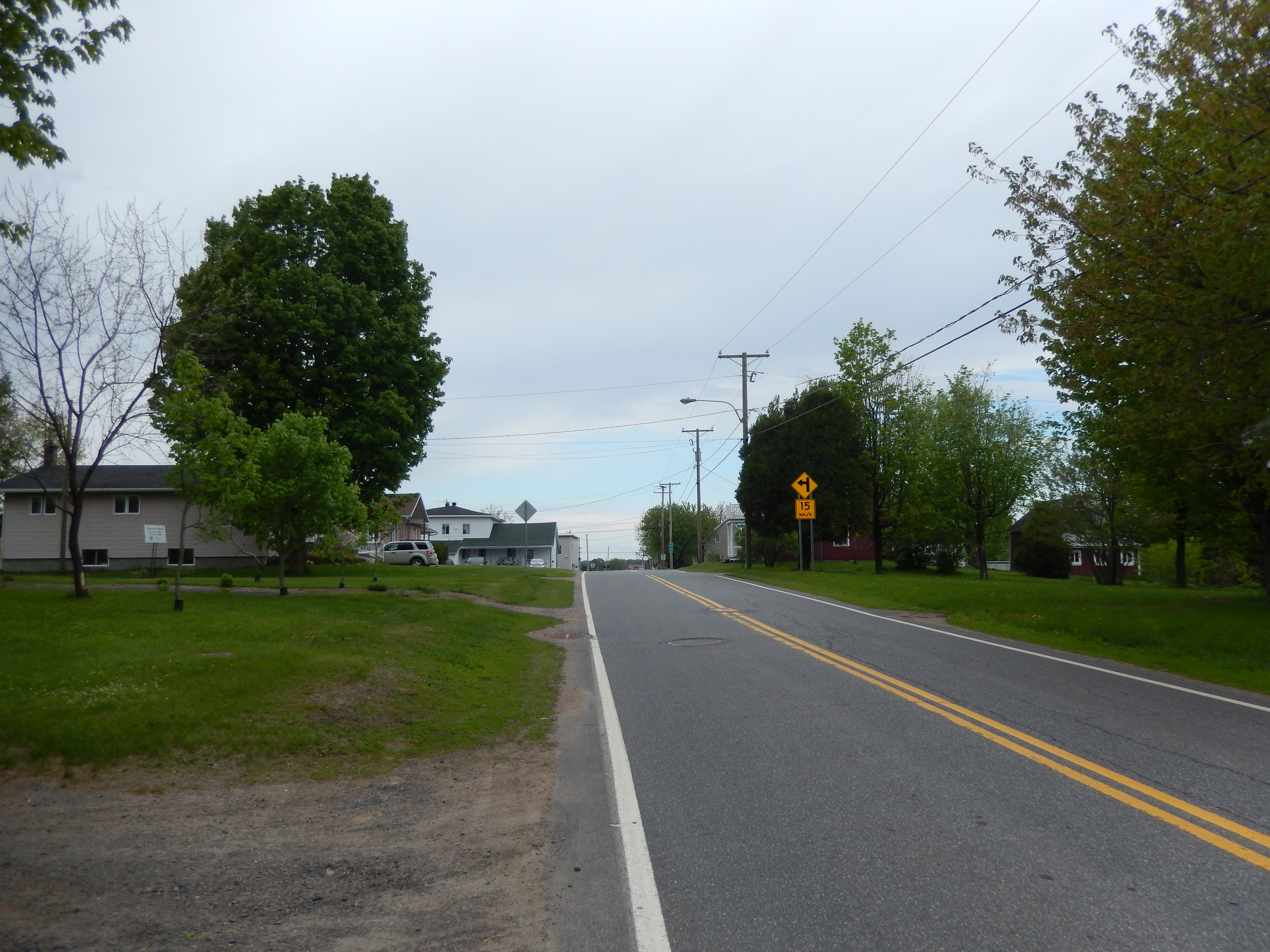

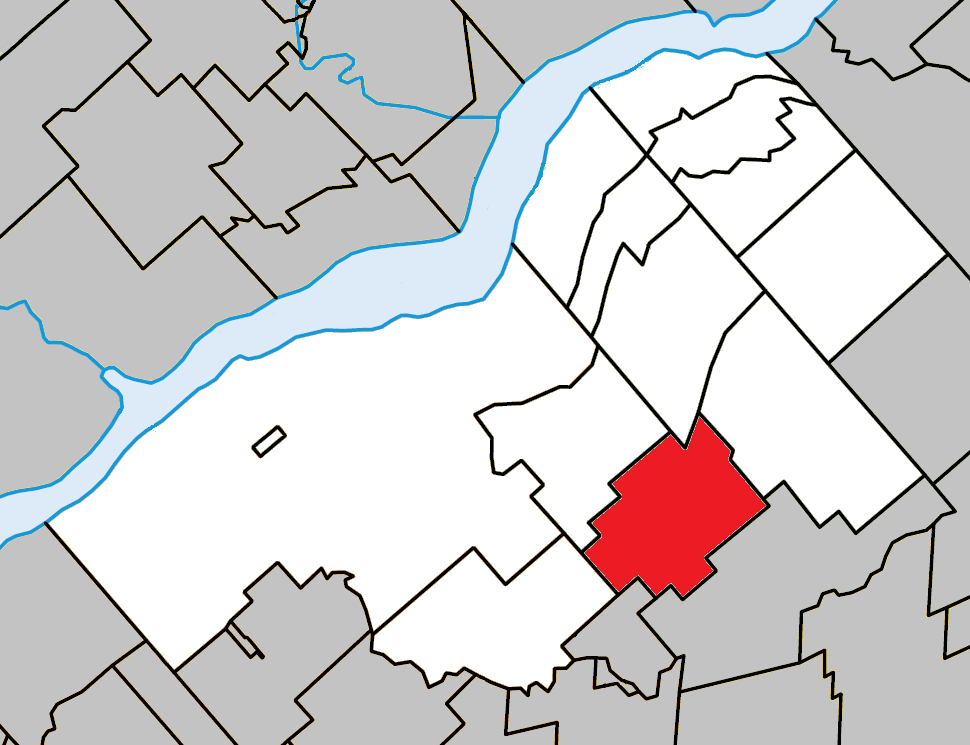
- Location within Bécancour RCM

- Location in southern Quebec
- Coordinates: 46°18′N 72°07′W
- Country: Canada
- Province: Quebec
- Region: Centre-du-Québec
- RCM: Bécancour
- Constituted: August 14, 1922

Government
  - Mayor: Emilie Garneau
  - Federal riding: Bécancour—Nicolet—Saurel—Alnôbak
  - Prov. riding: Nicolet-Bécancour

Area
  - Total: 74.20 km^{2} (28.65 sq mi)
  - Land: 74.60 km^{2} (28.80 sq mi)
- There is an apparent contradiction between two authoritative sources

Population (2021)
  - Total: 292
  - Density: 3.9/km^{2} (10/sq mi)
  - Pop 2016-2021: ▼3%
  - Dwellings: 132
- Time zone: UTC−5 (EST)
  - Summer (DST): UTC−4 (EDT)
- Postal code(s): G0X 1S0
- Area code: 819
- Highways: R-263
- Website: www.municipalitelemieux.ca

Lemieux (French pronunciation: [ləmjø]) is a municipality in the Centre-du-Québec region of the province of Quebec in Canada.

== See also ==
- List of municipalities in Quebec
