= Sainte-Marie-de-Blandford =

- Municipality
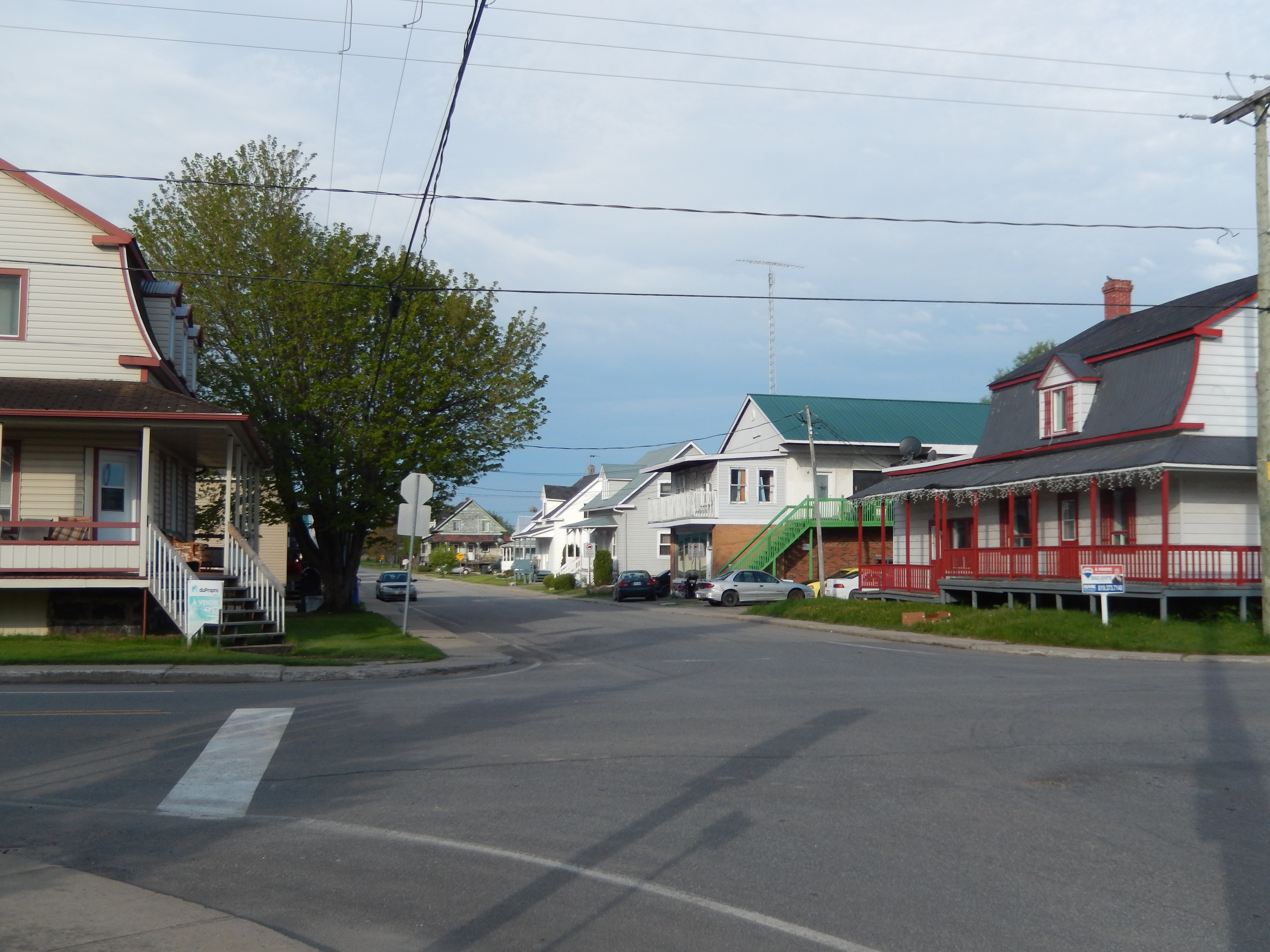

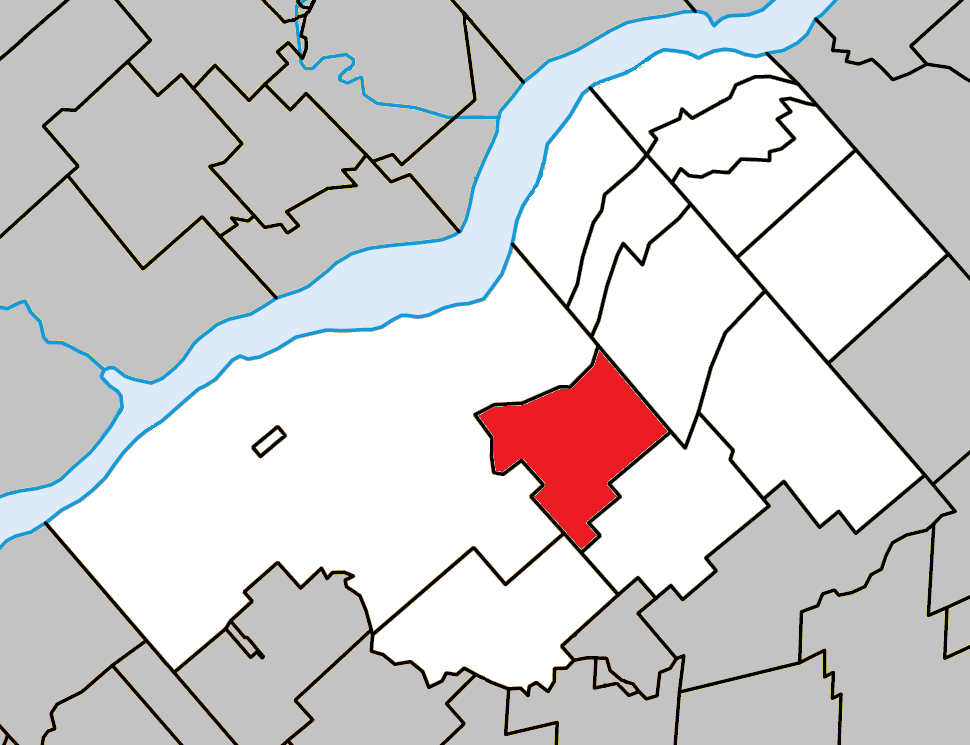
- Location within Bécancour RCM

- Location in southern Quebec
- Coordinates: 46°19′N 72°11′W
- Country: Canada
- Province: Quebec
- Region: Centre-du-Québec
- RCM: Bécancour
- Constituted: December 23, 1976

Government
  - Mayor: Ginette Deshaies
  - Federal riding: Bécancour—Nicolet—Saurel—Alnôbak
  - Prov. riding: Nicolet-Bécancour

Area
  - Total: 69.50 km^{2} (26.83 sq mi)
  - Land: 69.38 km^{2} (26.79 sq mi)

Population (2011)
  - Total: 466
  - Density: 6.7/km^{2} (17/sq mi)
  - Pop 2006-2011: ▼9.9%
  - Dwellings: 272
- Time zone: UTC−5 (EST)
  - Summer (DST): UTC−4 (EDT)
- Postal code(s): G0X 2W0
- Area code: 819
- Highways: R-226; R-263

Sainte-Marie-de-Blandford (French pronunciation: [sɛ̃t maʁi də blɛn(d)fɚd, -fœʁd]) is a municipality in the Centre-du-Québec region of the province of Quebec in Canada. It is an area of 69.36 sq km, and a low population density 6.7 people per sq kilometer as of data recorded in 2016 (more than the overall population density of Quebec which was recorded as 6.0 in 2016). As of 2011, the population was 466 which rose to 468 in 2016. The majority of the population consists of residents 15 through 65, with a relatively balanced proportion of men to women with men taking the lead.

== See also ==
- List of municipalities in Quebec
