= Bécancour, Quebec =

Bécancour
- City
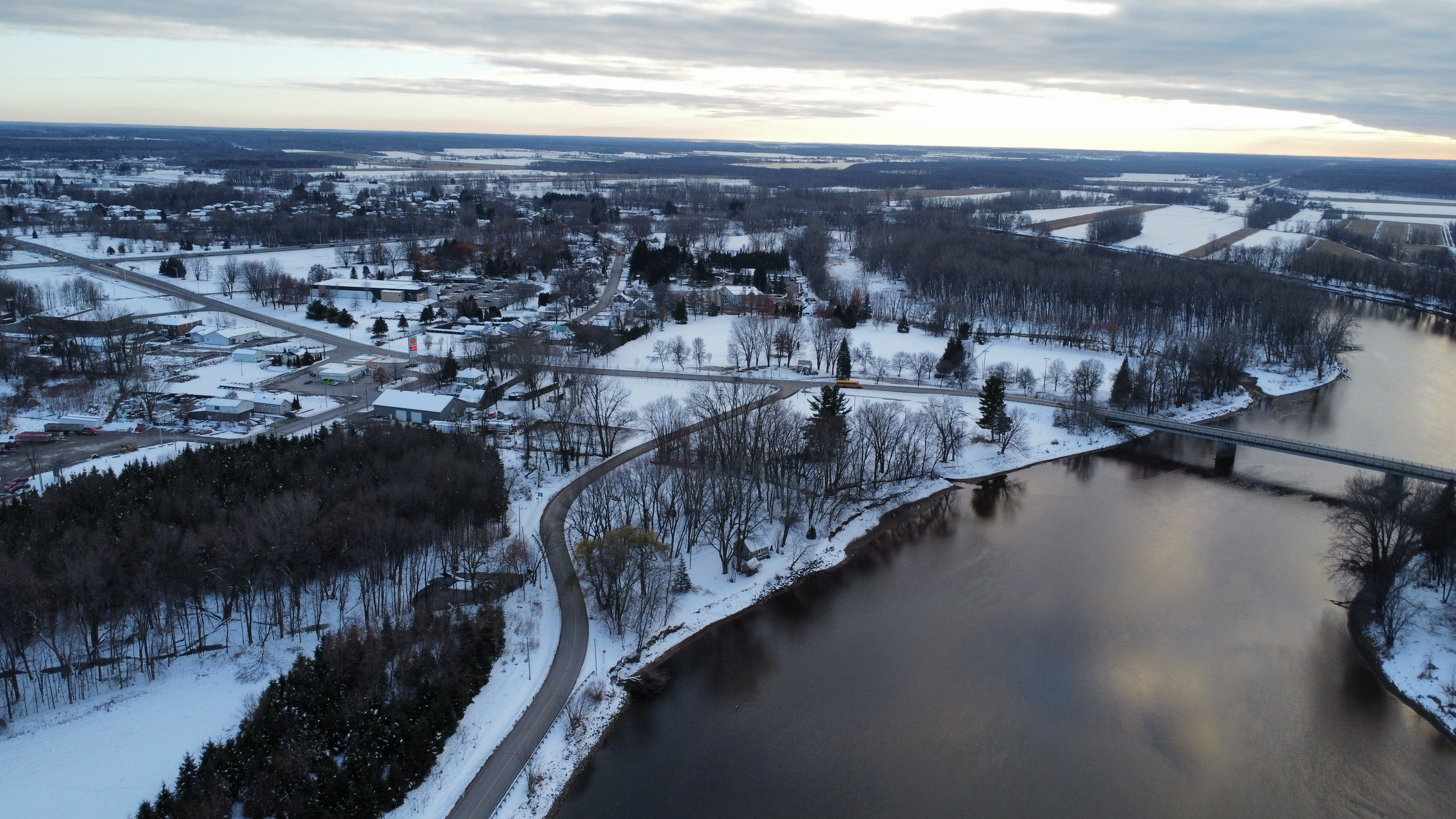
- Aerial view of Bécancour

- Coat of arms
- Motto: Vivre et grandir ("To live and to grow")
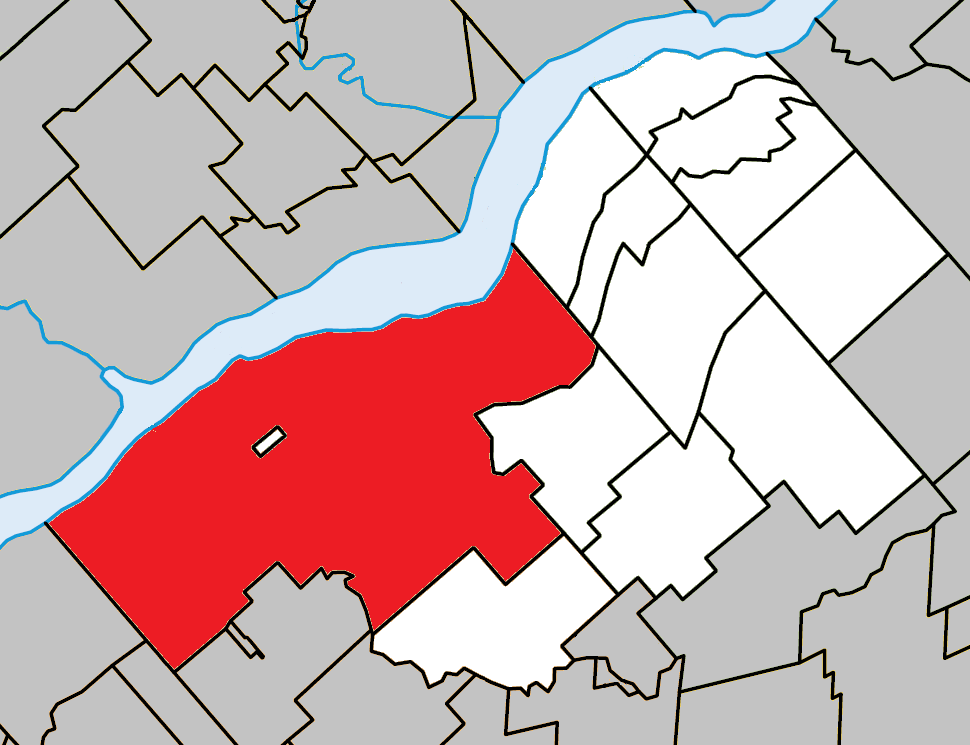
- Location within Bécancour RCM.

- Location in southern Quebec.
- Coordinates: 46°20′N 72°26′W
- Country: Canada
- Province: Quebec
- Region: Centre-du-Québec
- RCM: Bécancour
- Constituted: October 17, 1965

Government
  - Mayor: Pascal Blondin
  - Federal riding: Bécancour—Nicolet—Saurel—Alnôbak
  - Prov. riding: Nicolet-Bécancour

Area
  - City: 494.60 km^{2} (190.97 sq mi)
  - Land: 439.54 km^{2} (169.71 sq mi)
  - Urban: 3.79 km^{2} (1.46 sq mi)
- Elevation: 148 m (486 ft)

Population (2021)
  - City: 13,561
  - Density: 30.9/km^{2} (80/sq mi)
  - Urban: 4,748
  - Urban density: 1,252.8/km^{2} (3,245/sq mi)
  - Pop 2016-2021: ▲4.1%
  - Dwellings: 6,348
- Time zone: UTC−5 (EST)
  - Summer (DST): UTC−4 (EDT)
- Postal code(s): G9H
- Area code: 819
- Highways A-30 A-55: R-132; R-226; R-261
- Website: www.becancour.net

Bécancour (French pronunciation: [bekɑ̃kuʁ]) is a city in the Centre-du-Québec region of Quebec, Canada; it is the seat of the Bécancour Regional County Municipality. It is located on the south shore of the Saint Lawrence River at the confluence of the Bécancour River, opposite Trois-Rivières.

Wôlinak, an Abenaki Indian reserve, is an enclave within the town of Bécancour. They arrived from Norridgewock, Maine (formerly Acadia) in the aftermath of Father Rale's War.

There was a small migration of Acadians to the village (1759), after the British began the Expulsion of the Acadians from the Maritimes. Specifically, the Acadians migrated from present-day New Brunswick to avoid being killed or captured in the St. John River Campaign.

The town of Bécancour was created October 17, 1965, from an amalgamation of eleven municipalities. Bécancour was one of the province of Quebec's first amalgamated cities. At the time, Bécancour was the largest city in Quebec in terms of land area (as of 2003, the title belongs to La Tuque, Quebec).

Bécancour is now divided into six secteurs (lit. "sectors"): Bécancour, Saint-Grégoire, Gentilly, Précieux-Sang, Sainte-Angèle-de-Laval, and Sainte-Gertrude. Bécancour, Saint-Grégoire and Gentilly, each located near the shore of the Saint Lawrence River, can be considered the main urban centres. Autoroute 55 intersects Autoroute 30 and Route 132 at Saint-Grégoire.

Bécancour is part of the Trois-Rivières metropolitan area; many residents work in Trois-Rivières and commute across the Laviolette Bridge daily.

== History ==
Constituent municipalities of Bécancour included:

- La Nativité de Notre-Dame-de-Bécancour (1722)
- Saint-Édouard-de-Gentilly (1784)
- Saint-Grégoire-le-Grand (1802)
- Sainte-Gertrude (1845)
- Sainte-Angèle-de-Laval (1868)
- Très-Précieux-Sang-de-Notre-Seigneur (1903)

And the villages of:

- Larochelle (1863)
- Gentilly (1900)
- Villers (1901)
- Bécancour et Laval (1909)

The town of Bécancour was created October 17, 1965, from an amalgamation of eleven municipalities. Bécancour was one of the province of Quebec's first amalgamated cities.

A nuclear power plant, Gentilly Nuclear Generating Station, was commissioned in 1983 in the Gentilly sector; it was decommissioned in 2012.

=== Emblems and symbols ===
Floral emblem: Lilac

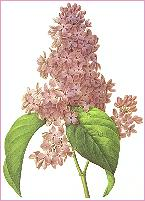

Bird: Ruby-throated hummingbird

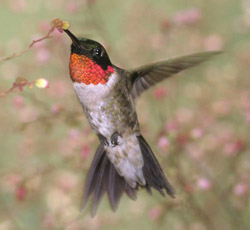

Slogan: De nature énergique
("An energetic nature")

== Geography ==
=== Communities ===
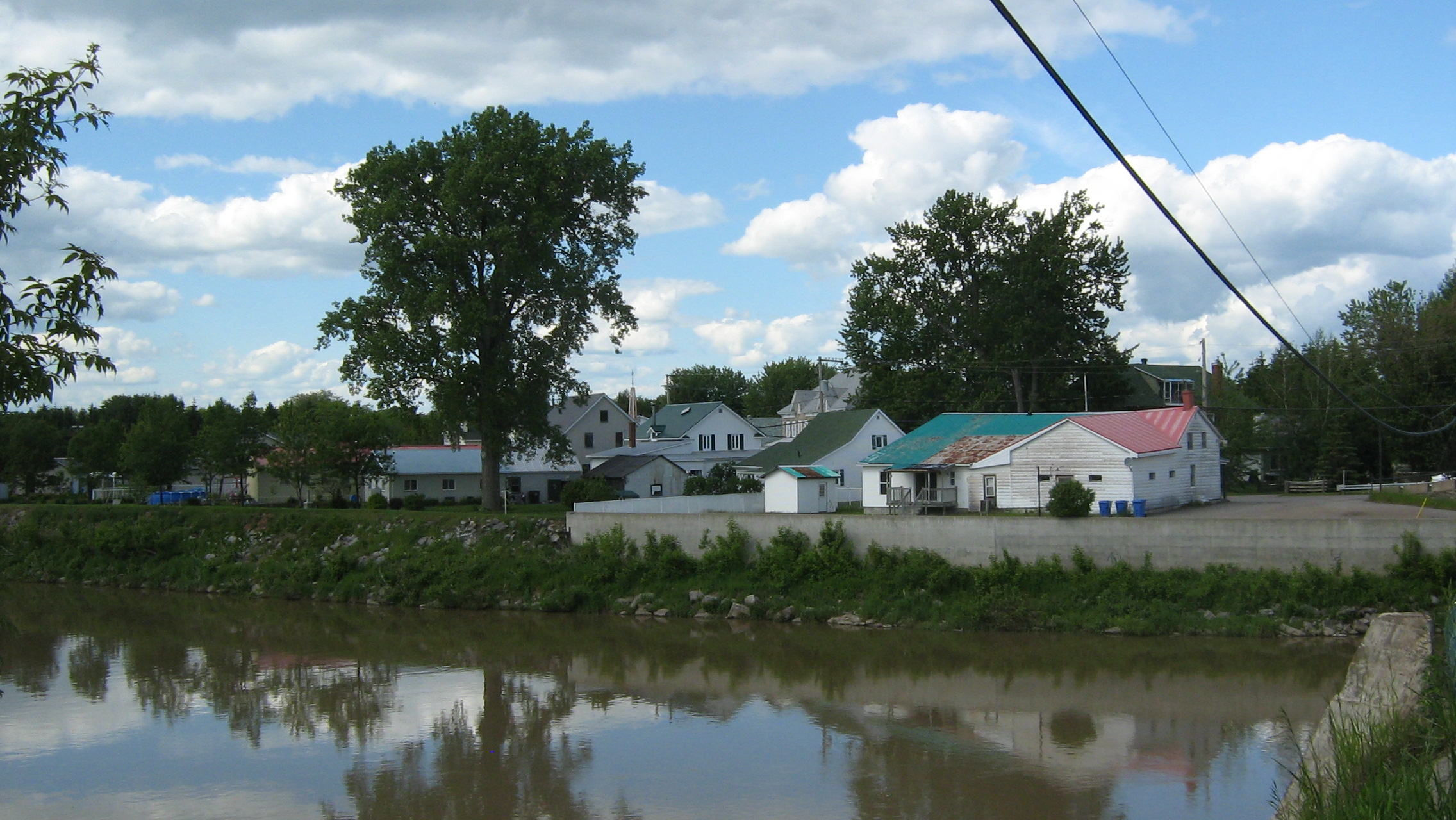
Village Bécancour

- Bécancour
- Gentilly
- Précieux-Sang
- Sainte-Angèle-de-Laval
- Sainte-Gertrude
- Saint-Grégoire

== Demographics ==
In the 2021 Census of Population conducted by Statistics Canada, Bécancour had a population of 13,561 living in 6,034 of its 6,348 total private dwellings, a change of 4.1% from its 2016 population of 13,031. With a land area of 439.54 km^{2} (169.71 sq mi), it had a population density of 30.9/km^{2} (79.9/sq mi) in 2021.

Knowledge of official languages (2021)
Language	Population	Percentage (%)
English Only	25	0.2%
French Only	9,300	70.6%
English and French	3,835	29.1%
Neither English nor French	10	0.1%

Mother Tongue (2021)
Language	Population	Percentage (%)
English	110	0.8%
French	12,840	97.5%
Non-official languages	115	0.9%

== Economy ==
The economy of Bécancour, once mainly agricultural, shifted towards heavy industry and manufacturing in the 1970s and 1980s. An industrial park was built in the area, attracting producers of aluminum, magnesium, refractory metals, and petroleum products; machine shops; and many related services, such as excavators and sales of industrial parts.

The magnesium smelter was operated by Norsk Hydro, and closed down by 2011.

=== Tourism ===
Despite its proximity to Trois-Rivières, Bécancour has a culture and identity of its own. The city hosts a hot air balloon festival, a weekly public marketplace, a biodiversity museum and interpretation centre, and a maritime pumpkin race.

== Sister cities ==
- Joué-lès-Tours, France

== Notable people ==
- Nicolas Perrot (1644–1717), explorer, diplomat, and fur trader.
- Blessed Louis Zephyrinus Moreau, Canadian Roman Catholic priest and fourth Bishop of Saint-Hyacinthe
- Denis Villeneuve, filmmaker, lived in Gentilly.
- Sam Montembeault, hockey player for the Montreal Canadiens
- Zachary Bolduc, hockey player for the Montreal Canadiens

== See also ==
- List of cities in Quebec
- Bécancour—Nicolet—Saurel—Alnôbak
- Gentilly Nuclear Generating Station
