= Nicolet-Yamaska (provincial electoral district) =

Former provincial electoral district in Quebec, Canada

Coordinates: 46.155°N 72.527°W

Quebec electoral district

Defunct provincial electoral district
- Legislature: National Assembly of Quebec
- District created: 1972
- District abolished: 1980
- District re-created: 1988
- District re-abolished: 2011
- First contested: 1973
- Last contested: 2008

Demographics
- Population (2006): 43,849
- Electors (2008): 34,889
- Area (km²): 2,389.52
- Census division(s): Arthabaska (part), Bécancour (part), Drummond (part), Nicolet-Yamaska (part)
- Census subdivision(s): Drummondville (part), Yamaska (part), Aston-Jonction, Baie-du-Febvre, Bécancour, Daveluyville, Grand-Saint-Esprit, La Visitation-de-Yamaska, Maddington, Nicolet, Pierreville, Sainte-Anne-du-Sault, Saint-Bonaventure, Sainte-Brigitte-des-Saults, Saint-Célestin (municipality), Saint-Célestin (village), Saint-David, Saint-Elphège, Sainte-Eulalie, Saint-François-du-Lac, Saint-Gérard-Majella, Saint-Guillaume, Saint-Joachim-de-Courval, Saint-Léonard-d'Aston, Saint-Marcel-de-Richelieu, Sainte-Monique, Sainte-Perpétue, Saint-Pie-de-Guire, Saint-Sylvère, Saint-Wenceslas, Saint-Zéphirin-de-Courval; Odanak, Wôlinak

Nicolet-Yamaska (French pronunciation: [nikɔlɛ(t) jamaska]) is a former provincial electoral district in the Centre-du-Québec and Montérégie regions of Quebec, Canada, that elected members to the National Assembly of Quebec.

As of its final election, it included the cities or municipalities of Pierreville, Nicolet, Bécancour, Sainte-Eulalie, Daveluyville, Saint-Leonard-d'Aston, Saint-Wenceslas and Saint-Gerard-Majella as well as portions of the city of Drummondville.

It was created for the 1973 election from parts of Nicolet and its final election was in 1976. It disappeared in the 1981 election and Nicolet was recreated. Nicolet disappeared again in the 1989 election, for which Nicolet-Yamaska was recreated. Nicolet-Yamaska's final election was in 2008. It disappeared in the 2012 election and the successor electoral district was Nicolet-Bécancour.

== Members of the National Assembly ==
1. Benjamin Faucher, Liberal (1973–1976)
2. Serge Fontaine, Union Nationale (1976–1981)
3. did not exist (1981–1989), see Nicolet
4. Maurice Richard, Liberal (1989–1994)
5. Michel Morin, Parti Québécois (1994–2007)
6. Éric Dorion, Action démocratique (2007–2008)
7. Jean-Martin Aussant, Parti Québécois (2008–2011); Independent (2011); Option nationale (2011–2012)

== Election results ==
2008 Quebec general election
Party	Candidate	Votes	%	±%
Parti Québécois	Jean-Martin Aussant	8,131	35.24	
Liberal	Mario Landry	7,956	34.48	
Action démocratique	Éric Dorion (incumbent)	6,044	26.20	
Québec solidaire	Marianne Mathis	940	4.07	
Total valid votes		23,071	98.14	
Rejected and declined votes		438	1.86	
Turnout		23,509	67.38	−10.35
Electors on the lists		34,889		
Source: Official Results, Le Directeur général des élections du Québec.

2007 Quebec general election
Party	Candidate	Votes	%	±%
Action démocratique	Éric Dorion	10,839	41.18	
Parti Québécois	Donald Martel	7,455	28.32	
Liberal	Yves Baril	6,770	25.72	
Québec solidaire	Jean Proulx	1,121	4.26	
Independent	Simonne Lizotte	138	0.52	
Total valid votes		26,323	98.73	
Rejected and declined votes		339	1.27	
Turnout		26,662	77.73	
Electors on the lists		34,301		
Source: Official Results, Le Directeur général des élections du Québec.

2003 Quebec general election
Party	Candidate	Votes	%	±%
Parti Québécois	Michel Morin	10,783	41.21	
Liberal	Jean Rousseau	8,927	34.12	
Action démocratique	Lise Blanchette	5,899	22.54	
Bloc Pot	Blak D. Blackburn	417	1.59	
Independent	Simonne Lizotte	141	0.54	
Total valid votes		26,167	98.49	
Rejected and declined votes		401	1.51	
Turnout		26,568	77.82	
Electors on the lists		34,140		
Source: Official Results, Le Directeur général des élections du Québec.

1998 Quebec general election
Party	Candidate	Votes	%	±%
Parti Québécois	Michel Morin	14,166	50.23	
Liberal	Daniel McMahon	10,369	36.77	
Action démocratique	Frédéric Lajoie	3,509	12.44	
Socialist Democracy	Robert Poirier	157	0.56	
Total valid votes		28,201	98.70	
Rejected and declined votes		372	1.30	
Turnout		28,573	84.59	
Electors on the lists		33,777		
Source: Official Results, Le Directeur général des élections du Québec.

1994 Quebec general election
Party	Candidate	Votes	%	±%
Parti Québécois	Michel Morin	13,427	50.13	+14.67
Liberal	Maurice Richard	12,520	46.74	−13.40
Natural Law	Jacques Houde	840	3.14	
Total valid votes		26,787	100.00	
Rejected and declined votes		816		
Turnout		27,603	84.85	+3.84
Electors on the lists		32,530		
Source: Official Results, Le Directeur général des élections du Québec.

1989 Quebec general election
Party	Candidate	Votes	%	±%
Liberal	Maurice Richard	15,164	60.14	
Parti Québécois	Guy Vachon	8,941	35.46	
Green	Jean-Léon Deschênes	1,111	4.41	–
Total valid votes		25,216	100.00	
Rejected and declined votes		508		
Turnout		25,724	81.01	
Electors on the lists		31,753		
Source: Official Results, Le Directeur général des élections du Québec.

== See also ==
- List of Quebec provincial electoral districts
- Canadian provincial electoral districts
