= Blanche River (Bécancour River tributary, Daveluyville) =

River in Centre-du-Québec, Quebec (Canada)

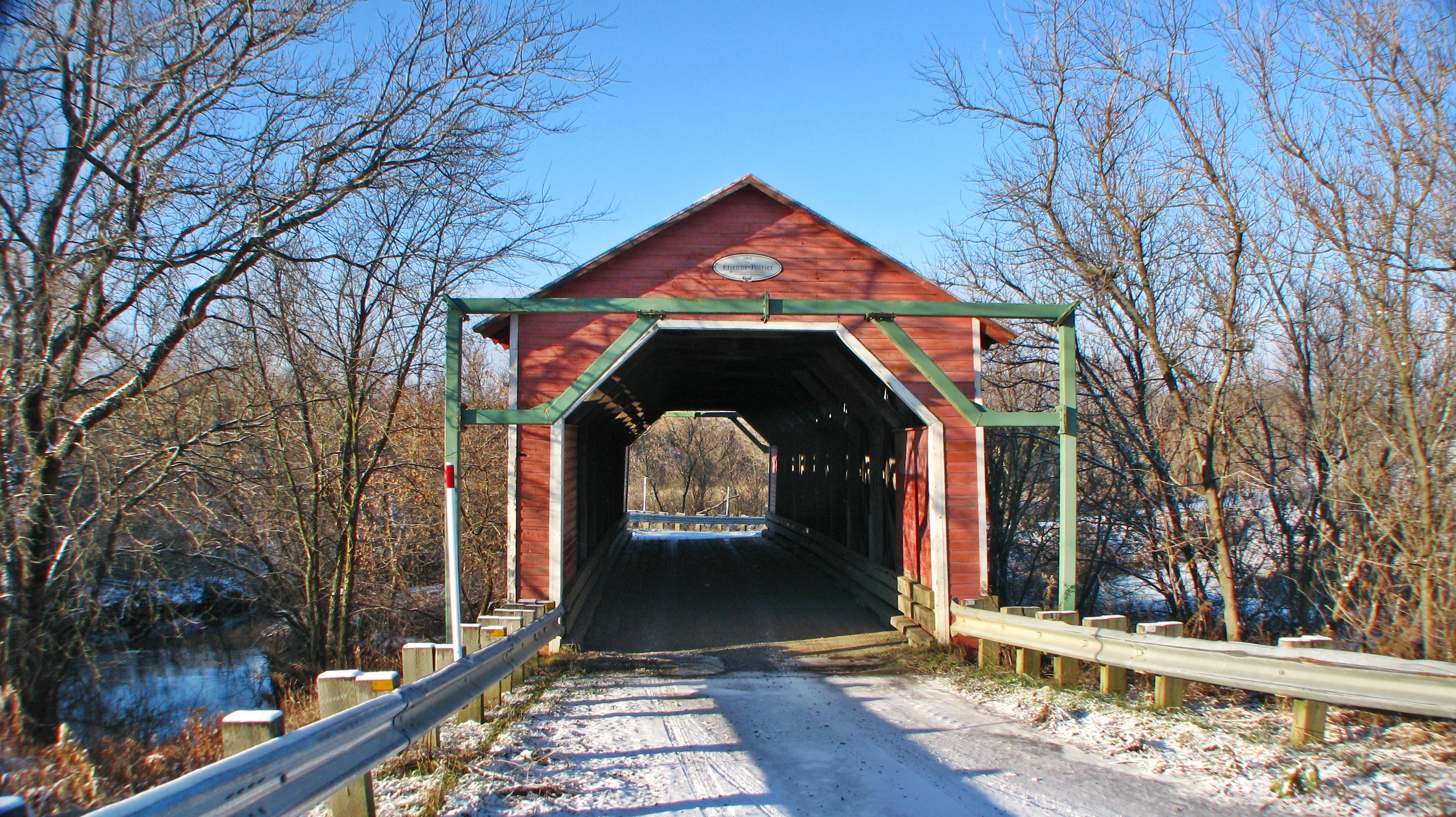
- The Blanche river at the Étienne-Poirier bridge
- Native name: Rivière Blanche (French)

Location
- Country: Canada
- Province: Quebec
- Region: Centre-du-Québec
- MRC: Nicolet-Yamaska Regional County Municipality, Bécancour Regional County Municipality
- Municipality: Sainte-Eulalie, Aston-Jonction, Saint-Wenceslas, Saint-Léonard-d'Aston, Saint-Célestin, Bécancour

Physical characteristics
- Source: Swampy area of Rang des Épinettes
  - location: Sainte-Eulalie
  - coordinates: 46.1351196°N 72.1762335°W
  - elevation: 91 m (299 ft)
- Mouth: Bécancour River
  - location: Daveluyville
  - coordinates: 46.2914793°N 72.3844843°W
  - elevation: 24 m (79 ft)
- Length: 51.1 km (31.8 mi)

Basin features
- Progression: Bécancour River, St. Lawrence River
- Tributaries
  - left: (upstream) ruisseau des Castors, ruisseau Gilbert, Décharge des Dix, ruisseau Beauchesne, ruisseau Ludger-Carignan, ruisseau Joanny, ruisseau Bruneau, ruisseau Deschènes, ruisseau Calixte-Tourigny, ruisseau Léveillée, ruisseau Ludger-Lemay, ruisseau Morin, ruisseau Paquin.
  - right: (upstream) ruisseau Antoine-Hébert, cours d'eau Vouligny, ruisseau Bédard, ruisseau Hélie, ruisseau Fourchu, branche nord du ruisseau Gagnon, ruisseau Lupien, ruisseau Jutras.

The Blanche River (French: rivière Blanche, pronounced [ʁivjɛʁ blɑ̃ʃ], lit. 'White River'; formerly designated "rivière Saint-Wenceslas") is a watercourse on the South shore of St. Lawrence River, in the administrative region of Centre-du-Québec, in the province of Quebec, in Canada. This river flows in the regional county municipalities of:

- Nicolet-Yamaska Regional County Municipality: municipalities of Sainte-Eulalie, Aston-Jonction, Saint-Wenceslas, Saint-Léonard-d'Aston and Saint-Célestin;
- Bécancour Regional County Municipality: city of Bécancour.

== Geography ==
The Blanche River flows northward mainly in agricultural (or forest, in places) territory on the south shore of the St. Lawrence River.

A marshy area (2.3 kilometres (1.4 mi) by 1.7 kilometres (1.1 mi)) straddling the limit of the municipalities of Sainte-Eulalie and Daveluyville (Defoy sector) constitutes the head of the waters of this river. This area is located in the Rang des Épinettes; it is drained by the Paquin stream (to the north), by the Vigneault stream (to the south) and the Béland stream (to the east). This area is located northeast of Saint-Samuel-de-Horton, southwest of Daveluyville, east of Sainte-Eulalie and south of autoroute 20.

The course of the Blanche river descends on 51.1 kilometres (31.8 mi), with a drop of 67 metres (220 ft), according to the following segments:

Course of the Blanche river from the head (segment of 14.1 kilometres (8.8 mi))

From the crossing of the Paquin stream and another small stream, the Blanche river flows through agricultural land on:

- 0.75 kilometres (0.47 mi) north, to autoroute 20;
- 0.9 kilometres (0.56 mi) north-east, in Sainte-Eulalie, to rue des Ormes;
- 2.5 kilometres (1.6 mi) west, in the third rang, up to the Route des Pins;
- 3.3 kilometres (2.1 mi) towards the west, in the third and 11th rang of Aston-Jonction, to the route du 11th rank;
- 2.75 kilometres (1.71 mi) to the southwest, in the rang des Sapins and the 11th rang;
- 3.9 kilometres (2.4 mi) north-west, in the tenth rang, crossing the railroad and the ninth rang road, then along the rue Principale, up to 400 metres (1,300 ft) east of the road junction in the village of Saint-Wenceslas.

Course of the river downstream from the village of Saint-Wenceslas (segment of 17.9 kilometres (11.1 mi))

From the village of Saint-Wenceslas, the river continues its course especially in agricultural areas on:

- 2.7 kilometres (1.7 mi) heading southwest, crossing rue Principale and going down to autoroute 55, in Saint-Wenceslas;
- 1.3 kilometres (0.81 mi) towards the southwest, to the mouth of the Fourchu stream;
- 0.4 kilometres (0.25 mi) south to the mouth of Bruneau brook;
- 0.3 kilometres (0.19 mi) west, up to the eighth rang road, still in Saint-Wenceslas;
- 4.0 kilometres (2.5 mi) towards the west, crossing a wooded area, up to the Hélie stream, passing through ranges VII and VI of Saint-Léonard-d'Aston;
- 1.5 kilometres (0.93 mi) westward, up to the Joanny stream, in range VI of Saint-Léonard-d'Aston;
- 2.0 kilometres (1.2 mi) north, to Route Saint-Joseph, in Saint-Célestin;
- 1.4 kilometres (0.87 mi) north, to the Bédard stream;
- 0.9 kilometres (0.56 mi) north, to the Ludger-Carignan stream;
- 3.2 kilometres (2.0 mi) northward, to Autoroute 55 (called "Autoroute de l'Énergie"), in Saint-Célestin;
- 200 metres (660 ft) eastward, to the Étienne-Poirier covered bridge, that is, rang Pellerin road.

Course of the river downstream of the covered bridge (segment of 19.1 kilometres (11.9 mi))

From the Étienne-Poirier covered bridge, the Blanche river continues its course, especially in agricultural areas on:

- 1.8 kilometres (1.1 mi) northward, to the Vouligny stream, in Saint-Célestin;
- 2.2 kilometres (1.4 mi) north-west, up to the Moïse Poirier stream;
- 0.8 kilometres (0.50 mi) north, to the "Dix landfill" which drains the south-east of the village of Saint-Célestin;
- 0.6 kilometres (0.37 mi) northward, to the Gilbert stream which drains the north of the village of Saint-Célestin;
- 3.2 kilometres (2.0 mi) north, crossing the road 161 kilometres (100 mi), up to the Antoine-Hébert stream;
- 1.0 kilometre (0.62 mi) north, up to the Jacques-Leblanc stream;
- 3.6 kilometres (2.2 mi) north, then north-west, to the bridge over the route de la Seine and the Castors stream;
- 3.7 kilometres (2.3 mi) north, then northeast in a forest zone, to the Fraser Road bridge;
- 2.0 kilometres (1.2 mi) northeasterly to the boul. Danube, which runs along the south bank of the Bécancour River;
- 230 metres (750 ft) towards the northeast to the mouth where the water flows into the Bécancour River in the area of Precieux-Sang of the city of Bécancour.

The neighboring hydrographic slopes of the Blanche River are:

- in the north-east: the Bécancour River;
- to the south-west: the Nicolet River;
- to the east: the Portage River which is a tributary of the Bécancour River.

== Toponymy ==
Formerly, this river was designated "Saint-Wenceslas river" or "Wenceslas river".

The toponym "Rivière Blanche" was made official on November 27, 1979, at the Place Names Bank of the Commission de toponymie du Québec.

== See also ==
- List of rivers of Quebec
