= Independent candidates in the 2007 Quebec provincial election =

There were several independent candidates in the 2007 Quebec provincial election, none of whom were elected. Information about these candidates may be found here.

== Candidates ==
=== Nicolet-Yamaska: Simonne Lizotte ===
Simmone Lizotte is a frequent candidate for public office in Nicolet. She served on the Commission scolaire de la Riveraine from 2003 to 2007 and has been a candidate for both the Nicolet municipal council and the National Assembly of Quebec.

Elected as a school commissioner in 2003, Lizotte was suspended from her responsibilities between December 2006 and March 2007. She complained about her treatment to the provincial education minister and, in the process, alleged that there were several irregularities in her board's activities. She also said that she sympathized somewhat with the Action démocratique du Québec in its pledge to abolish Quebec's school boards.

When campaigning for re-election in 2007, Lizotte highlighted her political, social, and religious convictions and pledged to defend the autonomy of the school system. She was defeated.

Between 2003 and 2007, Lizotte sought election twice to the Nicolet council and twice to the National Assembly. After a failed candidacy in the 2005 municipal election, she neglected to submit an expense report and was given a small fine. Running again in a 2006 by-election, she pledged to fight poverty and pursue issues related to social development, the family, the environment, agriculture, and young people. She finished last in a field of five candidates.

Electoral record
Election	Division	Party	Votes	%	Place	Winner
2003 provincial	Nicolet-Yamaska	Independent	141	0.54	5/5	Michel Morin, Parti Québécois
2003 school board	Commission scolaire de la Riveraine, Ward Six	n/a	elected			
2005 municipal election	Nicolet council	n/a	defeated			
by-election, 17 December 2006	Nicolet council, Ward Six	n/a	23	1.48	5/5	Denis Jutras
2007 provincial	Nicolet-Yamaska	Independent	138	0.52	5/5	Éric Dorion, Action démocratique du Québec
2007 school board	Commission scolaire de la Riveraine, Ward Six	n/a	defeated		2/2	Chantal Tardif

=== Richelieu: Normand Philibert ===
Normand Philibert has over thirty years of experience as a teacher. He intended to run as an independent candidate for the House of Commons of Canada in the 2006 federal election, but his name did ultimately not appear on the ballot; he was a school commissioner during this period, and he promised to make education issues his priority. He also promised to expose problems with the justice system in Sorel, Quebec, citing personal experiences. He received 145 votes (0.48%) in 2007, finishing sixth against Parti Québécois incumbent Sylvain Simard.
