= Maurice Richard (politician) =

Canadian politician (born 1946)

Mayor of Bécancour, Quebec
- In office 1995–2013
- Preceded by: Jean-Guy Dubois
- Succeeded by: Jean-Guy Dubois
- In office 1975–1985

MNA for Nicolet-Yamaska
- In office 1989–1994
- Preceded by: division created
- Succeeded by: Michel Morin

MNA for Nicolet
- In office 1985–1989
- Preceded by: Yves Beaumier
- Succeeded by: division abolished

Councillor in Bécancour, Quebec
- In office 1971–1976

Personal details
- Born: September 22, 1946 (age 79) Sainte-Angèle-de-Laval, Quebec
- Party: Liberal

Maurice Richard (born September 22, 1946) is a Canadian politician in the province of Quebec. He was a Liberal member of the National Assembly of Quebec from 1985 to 1994 and was the mayor of Bécancour, a position to which he was first elected in 1976.

== Early life and career ==
Richard was born in Sainte-Angèle-de-Laval, Quebec and received his early education there and in Nicolet. He attained certification from the Institut national des viandes in 1973 and later operated a food market in Bécancour. He has also been an artist and painter since 1976.

Richard was a councillor in Bécancour from 1971 to 1976 and first served as the town's mayor from 1976 to 1985. He was interviewed by The Globe and Mail in 1983 as part of a feature piece on the community's industrial projects; in the course of the interview, he highlighted Bécancour's port on the St. Lawrence River, its efficient road and rail system, and its low-cost electricity.

Richard came out as gay in the 1970s. His sexual identity became an issue when he ran for provincial office in 1985 but did not hurt his standing with the electorate. In a 2011 interview, he said, "Les gens ne sont pas réticents à élire des homosexuels. [...] L’homophobie existe bien sûr dans certains milieux, mais nous sommes reconnus comme une société progressiste."("People are not reluctant to elect homosexuals.[...] Homophobia exists of course in some circles, but we are recognized as a progressive society.")

== Provincial politician ==
Richard was elected to the National Assembly of Quebec for Nicolet in the 1985 provincial election, defeating Parti Québécois (PQ) cabinet minister Yves Beaumier by a significant margin. The Liberals won a majority government in this election, and Richard entered the legislature as a backbench supporter of Robert Bourassa's administration. In 1988, he chaired a task force that examined Quebec's Sunday shopping laws; its report recommended that large food stores remain closed on Sundays, but that weekday hours be extended from 62 to 71 hours per week to allow stores to stay open later. Richard also chaired the provincial agriculture, fisheries and food committee from 1987 to 1994.

He was re-elected without difficulty in the 1989 election but narrowly lost to Parti Québécois challenger Michel Morin in the 1994 election as the Liberals were defeated provincially. After his defeat, Richard chaired an internal Liberal Party committee working on policy strategies for the "Non" side in the 1995 Quebec referendum on sovereignty.

== Return to municipal politics ==
Richard began his second tenure as mayor of Bécancour in 1995 and was re-elected in 1999, 2003, 2005, and 2009. He has devoted significant attention to industrial issues; in 2004, he convened a meeting between local business and labour leaders in a bid to resolve a strike at an Alcoa aluminum plant.

Richard took part in the ground-breaking ceremony for a solar silicon metal facility in 2007. He supported Hydro-Québec's 2008 decision to refurbish Bécancour's Candu Gentilly 2 nuclear generating station, saying that his region depends on jobs produced by the plant. In the aftermath of the 2011 Japanese nuclear accidents, he argued that there was no chance of a similar accident happening in his community. Richard said that Candu's cooling system is much different from that used at the Fukushima Daiichi Nuclear Power Plant and that the ground under Bécancour is very solid, adding "If people are worried about earthquakes, I strongly suggest they come and live in Bécancour."

== Electoral record ==
2009 Bécancour municipal election: Mayor
Candidate	Votes	%
(x)Maurice Richard	acclaimed	.
Source: Élections municipales 2009, Affairs municipales, Régions et Occupation du territoire, Government of Quebec

2005 Bécancour municipal election: Mayor
Candidate	Votes	%
(x)Maurice Richard	2,848	64.86
Pierre Duplessis	1,543	35.14
Total valid votes	4,391	100
Source: "Les maires sortants de Bécancour et de Plessisville sont réélus", Radio-Canada, 6 November 2005, accessed 14 May 2011.

2003 Bécancour municipal election: Mayor
Candidate	Votes	%
(x)Maurice Richard	acclaimed	.
Source: Biography: Maurice Richard, National Assembly of Quebec, accessed 14 May 2011.

1999 Bécancour municipal election: Mayor
Candidate	Votes	%
(x)Maurice Richard	acclaimed	.
Source: Biography: Maurice Richard, National Assembly of Quebec, accessed 14 May 2011.

1994 Quebec general election: Nicolet-Yamaska
Party	Candidate	Votes	%	±%
Parti Québécois	Michel Morin	13,427	50.13	+14.67
Liberal	Maurice Richard	12,520	46.74	−13.40
Natural Law	Jacques Houde	840	3.14	
Total valid votes		26,787	100.00	
Rejected and declined votes		816		
Turnout		27,603	84.85	+3.84
Electors on the lists		32,530		
Source: Official Results, Le Directeur général des élections du Québec.

1989 Quebec general election: Nicolet-Yamaska
Party	Candidate	Votes	%	±%
Liberal	Maurice Richard	15,164	60.14	
Parti Québécois	Guy Vachon	8,941	35.46	
Green	Jean-Léon Deschênes	1,111	4.41	–
Total valid votes		25,216	100.00	
Rejected and declined votes		508		
Turnout		25,724	81.01	
Electors on the lists		31,753		
Source: Official Results, Le Directeur général des élections du Québec.

1985 Quebec general election: Nicolet
Party	Candidate	Votes	%	±%
Liberal	Maurice Richard	15,816	59.01	
Parti Québécois	Yves Beaumier	10,421	38.88	
New Democratic	Normand Villeneuve	425	1.59	
Christian Socialist	Hélène Couture	139	0.52	
Total valid votes		26,801	100.00	
Rejected and declined votes		286		
Turnout		27,087	84.93	
Electors on the lists		31,894		
Source: Official Results, Le Directeur général des élections du Québec.
