= Portage River (Bécancour River tributary) =

River in Centre-du-Québec, Quebec (Canada)

- Native name: Rivière Portage (French)

Location
- Country: Canada
- Province: Quebec
- Region: Centre-du-Québec
- MRC: Arthabaska Regional County Municipality
- Municipalities: Saint-Valère, Daveluyville

Physical characteristics
- Source: Agricultural and forest streams
  - location: Saint-Rosaire
  - coordinates: 46.179983°N 72.106097°W
  - elevation: 106 m (348 ft)
- Mouth: Bécancour River
  - location: Daveluyville
  - coordinates: 46.19667°N 72.18417°W
  - elevation: 39 m (128 ft)
- Length: 12.5 km (7.8 mi)

Basin features
- Progression: Bécancour River, St. Lawrence River
- Tributaries
  - left: (upstream) ruisseau Morissette, ruisseau Soucy, ruisseau David-Bourque
  - right: (upstream) ruisseau Beauchesne, ruisseau Blaise, ruisseau "Le Petit Portage"

The rivière du Portage (in English: Portage Rivere) is a tributary of the Bécancour River which flows on the south shore of the St. Lawrence River. The "rivière du Portage" flows in the municipalities of Saint-Valère and Daveluyville, in the Arthabaska Regional County Municipality (MRC), in the administrative region from Centre-du-Québec, to Quebec, to Canada.

== Geography ==
The main hydrographic slopes of the "Portage river" are:

- north side: Bécancour River;
- east side: Pimbina river, Blanche River;
- south side: Bulstrode River
- west side: Blanche River.

The "Portage River" has its source in an agricultural area of the municipality of Saint-Valère, south of the Defoy hamlet (of Daveluyville), on the east side of route 261 and north of the Bulstrode River.

From its source, the Portage River flows over 12.5 kilometres (7.8 mi), especially in agricultural (or forest, in places) territory according to the following segments:

- 1.4 kilometres (0.87 mi) north into Saint-Valère;
- 3.6 kilometres (2.2 mi) north through Daveluyville, passing west of the Defoy hamlet, to highway 20;
- 7.5 kilometres (4.7 mi) north to its mouth.

The Portage River flows onto the south shore of the Bécancour River, just downstream from Portage Island and downstream from the village of Daveluyville.

== Toponymy ==
The toponym "rivière du Portage" was made official on December 5, 1968, at Commission de toponymie du Québec.

== See also ==
- List of rivers of Quebec
