= Portage River =

Portage River may refer to:

== Canada ==
- Portage River (Alberta), a tributary of the Peace River
- Portage River (Beauce-Sartigan), a river in Quebec
- Portage River (Bécancour River tributary), a river in Quebec
- Portage River (Boucher River tributary), a river in Quebec
- Portage River (La Sarre River tributary), a river in Quebec
- Portage River (New Brunswick), a tributary of the Northwest Miramichi River
- Portage River (Percé), a river in Quebec
- Portage River (Petit-Saguenay River tributary), a tributary of the Northwest Miramichi River
- Portage River, a river of Prince Edward Island

== United States ==
=== Michigan ===
- Portage River (Houghton County, Michigan), the southern end of the Keweenaw Waterway
- Portage River (Jackson County, Michigan), a tributary of the Grand River
- Portage River (Kalamazoo/St. Joseph Counties), a tributary of the St. Joseph River
- Portage River (Livingston/Washtenaw counties), a tributary of the Huron River

=== Minnesota ===
- Portage River (Fish Hook River tributary), Minnesota
- Portage River (Moose Horn River tributary), Minnesota
- Portage River (Nina Moose River tributary), Minnesota

=== Ohio ===
- Portage River (Ohio), empties into Lake Erie near Port Clinton, Ohio

== Historical uses ==
- The South Branch of the Chicago River, once called the Portage River
