= Elphège Gravel =

- Bishop of Nicolet, Quebec
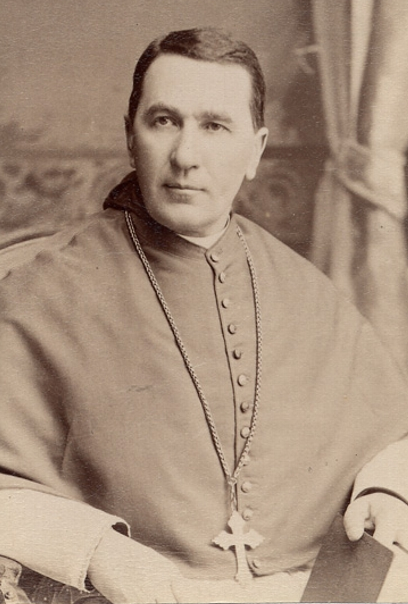
- Diocese: Nicolet
- Installed: July 10, 1885
- Term ended: January 28, 1904
- Predecessor: None
- Successor: Joseph-Simon-Herman Brunault

Orders
- Ordination: September 11, 1870

Personal details
- Born: October 12, 1838 Saint-Antoine-sur-Richelieu, Lower Canada
- Died: January 28, 1904 (aged 65) Nicolet, Quebec

Elphège Gravel (October 12, 1838 – January 28, 1904) was a Canadian Roman Catholic priest and the 1st Bishop of Nicolet, Québec from 1885 to 1904.
