= Nicolet-Bécancour =

Provincial electoral district in Quebec, Canada

Quebec electoral district

Provincial electoral district
- Legislature: National Assembly of Quebec
MNA
Guillaume Langlois
Conservative
- District created: 2011
- First contested: 2012
- Last contested: 2026

Demographics
- Population (2011): 49,310
- Electors (2012): 39,261
- Area (km²): 2,796.3
- Pop. density (per km²): 17.6
- Census division(s): Arthabaska (part), Bécancour (part), Drummond (part), Nicolet-Yamaska (part)
- Census subdivision(s): Aston-Jonction, Baie-du-Febvre, Bécancour, Daveluyville, Deschaillons-sur-Saint-Laurent, Fortierville, Grand-Saint-Esprit, La Visitation-de-Yamaska, Lemieux, Maddington Falls, Manseau, Nicolet, Parisville, Pierreville, Saint-Bonaventure, Sainte-Brigitte-des-Saults, Sainte-Cécile-de-Lévrard, Saint-Célestin (municipality), Saint-Célestin (village), Saint-Elphège, Sainte-Eulalie, Saint-François-du-Lac, Sainte-Françoise, Saint-Guillaume, Saint-Léonard-d'Aston, Sainte-Marie-de-Blandford, Sainte-Monique, Sainte-Perpétue, Saint-Pie-de-Guire, Saint-Pierre-les-Becquets, Sainte-Sophie-de-Lévrard, Saint-Sylvère, Saint-Wenceslas, Saint-Zéphirin-de-Courval; Odanak, Wôlinak.

Nicolet-Bécancour (French pronunciation: [nikɔlɛ(t) bekɑ̃kuʁ]) is a provincial electoral district in the Centre-du-Québec region of Quebec, Canada, that elects members to the National Assembly of Quebec. It notably includes the municipalities of Bécancour, Nicolet, Saint-Léonard-d'Aston, Daveluyville, Pierreville, Saint-François-du-Lac, Saint-Guillaume, Saint-Pierre-les-Becquets and Saint-Wenceslas.

It was created for the 2012 election from parts of the former Nicolet-Yamaska and Lotbinière electoral districts.

== Members of the National Assembly ==
Legislature	Years	Member	Party
Riding created from Nicolet-Yamaska and Lotbinière
40th	2012–2014	Donald Martel	Coalition Avenir Québec
41st	2014–2018	Donald Martel	Coalition Avenir Québec
42nd	2018–2022	Donald Martel	Coalition Avenir Québec
43rd	2022–2026	Donald Martel	Coalition Avenir Québec
44th	2026–Present	Guillaume Langlois	Conservative

== Election results ==
2026 Quebec general election
** Preliminary results — Not yet official **
Party	Candidate	Votes	%	±%
Conservative	Guillaume Langlois	12,574	41.21	
Parti Québécois	Jérôme Gagnon	8,788	28.80	
Coalition Avenir Québec	Donald Martel	4,988	16.35	
Liberal	Sophie Martinbeault	2,438	7.99	
Québec solidaire	Milan Codebecq-Pérusse	1,364	4.47	
Climat Québec	Marc-Olivier Billette	216	0.71	
Independent	Christian Collard	85	0.28	
Présence	Steve Lauzier	60	0.20	
Total valid votes				
Total rejected ballots				
Turnout			75.20	
Electors on the lists			–	–
Source: Élections Québec

2022 Quebec general election
Party	Candidate	Votes	%	±%
Coalition Avenir Québec	Donald Martel	13,956	47.05	-8.24
Conservative	Mario Lyonnais	6,595	22.23	+20.19
Parti Québécois	Philippe Dumas	5,095	17.18	+1.46
Québec solidaire	Jacques Thériault Watso	2,610	8.80	-3.54
Liberal	Marie-Josée Jacques	1,406	4.74	-7.83
Total valid votes		29,662	98.38	–
Total rejected ballots		488	1.62	-0.32
Turnout		30,150	72.52	+0.75
Electors on the lists		41,576	–	–
Coalition Avenir Québec hold		Swing		-14.21

2018 Quebec general election
Party	Candidate	Votes	%	±%
Coalition Avenir Québec	Donald Martel	15,562	55.29	+16.65
Parti Québécois	Lucie Allard	4,423	15.71	-6.55
Liberal	Marie-Claude Durand	3,539	12.57	-15.24
Québec solidaire	François Poisson	3,474	12.34	+4.42
Conservative	Jessie Mc Nicoll	576	2.05	+0.54
Green	Vincent Marcotte	403	1.43	–
Bloc Pot	Blak D. Blackburn	170	0.6	–
Total valid votes		28,147	98.06	
Total rejected ballots		556	1.94	
Turnout		28,703	71.77	-2.43
Eligible voters		39,995		
Coalition Avenir Québec hold		Swing		+11.6
Source(s) "Rapport des résultats officiels du scrutin". Élections Québec.

2014 Quebec general election
Party	Candidate	Votes	%	±%
Coalition Avenir Québec	Donald Martel	11,168	38.64	+6.63
Liberal	Denis Vallée	8,038	27.81	+5.34
Parti Québécois	Jean-René Dubois	6,433	22.26	+3.72
Québec solidaire	Marc Dion	2,290	7.92	–
Option nationale	Marjolaine Lachapelle	638	2.21	-23.64
Conservative	Guillaume Laquerre	333	1.15	+0.01
Total valid votes		28,900	98.27	–
Total rejected ballots		510	1.73	–
Turnout		29,410	74.20	-4.41
Electors on the lists		39,638	–	–

2012 Quebec general election
Party	Candidate	Votes	%	±%
Coalition Avenir Québec	Donald Martel	9,745	32.01	+4.65
Option nationale	Jean-Martin Aussant	7,869	25.85	–
Liberal	Marc Descôteaux	6,840	22.47	-11.51
Parti Québécois	Gilles Mayrand	5,644	18.54	-16.24
Conservative	Mathieu Benoit	348	1.14	–
Total valid votes		30,446	98.54	–
Total rejected ballots		450	1.46	–
Turnout		30,896	78.61	
Electors on the lists		39,304	–	–
Coalition Avenir Québec notional gain from Parti Québécois			Swing	+10.44

^ Change is from redistributed results; CAQ change is from ADQ

== See also ==
- List of Quebec provincial electoral districts
- Canadian provincial electoral districts
