= Jean-Martin Aussant =

Canadian politician (born 1970)

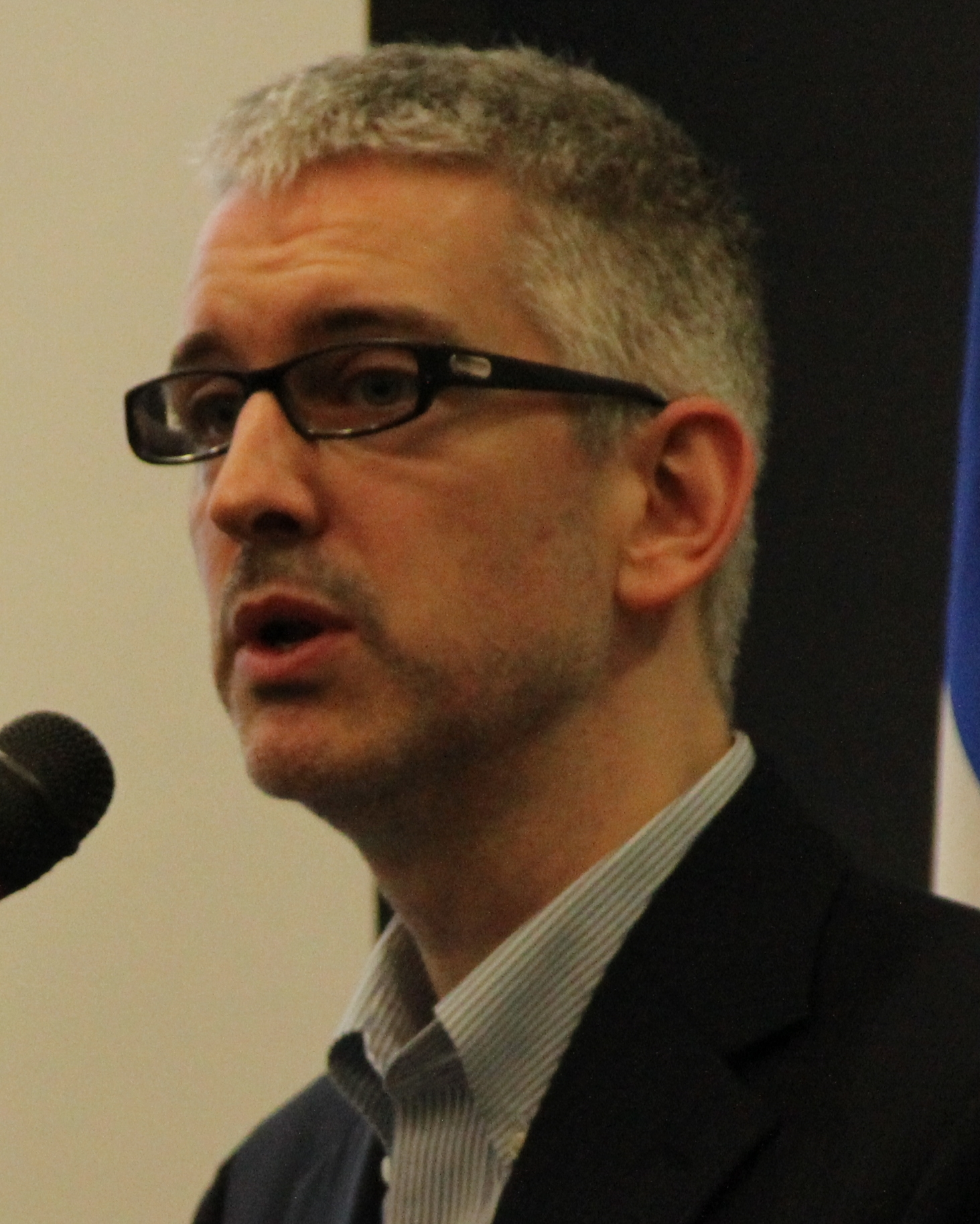

Member of the National Assembly of Quebec for Nicolet-Yamaska
- In office 2008–2012
- Preceded by: Éric Dorion
- Succeeded by: Donald Martel

Leader of Option nationale
- In office October 31, 2011 – June 19, 2013
- Succeeded by: Sol Zanetti

Personal details
- Born: June 1, 1970 (age 56) Sorel, Quebec, Canada
- Party: Parti Québécois (2008–2011, 2018-present)
- Other political affiliations: Independent (2011-2011); Option nationale (2011–2013)

Jean-Martin Aussant (French: [ʒɑ̃ maʁtɛ̃ ɔsɑ̃]) is a Canadian economist, musician, and politician, now serving as Executive director of the Chantier de l'économie sociale. He represented Nicolet-Yamaska in the National Assembly of Quebec from 2008 to 2012, first as a member of the Parti Québécois and then as leader of his own party, Option nationale. He was defeated when he ran for re-election in Nicolet-Bécancour in the 2012 general election. He later rejoined the Parti Québécois to run unsuccessfully in the 2018 Quebec election.

== Early life and career ==
Aussant was born in Sorel, Quebec. He has a bachelor's degree in Business Administration from the Université Laval (1993) and a master's degree in Economic Analysis from the Université de Montréal (1995). He started Ph.D. work at the Universitat Autònoma de Barcelona in Spain, but left in 1997 to work as a consultant for Barra International, now a unit of MSCI.

Aussant was a research director and portfolio manager at Addenda Capital from 1999 to 2003 and a vice-president at Morgan Stanley Capital International/Barra in London, Britain from 2003 to 2005. Returning to Quebec in 2005, he was a manager for Canada's Public Sector Pension Investment Board for two years before starting a private consulting practice. He was also a founding director of the Montreal divisions of both the Global Association of Risk Professionals and the Professional Risk Managers' International Association.

== Legislator ==
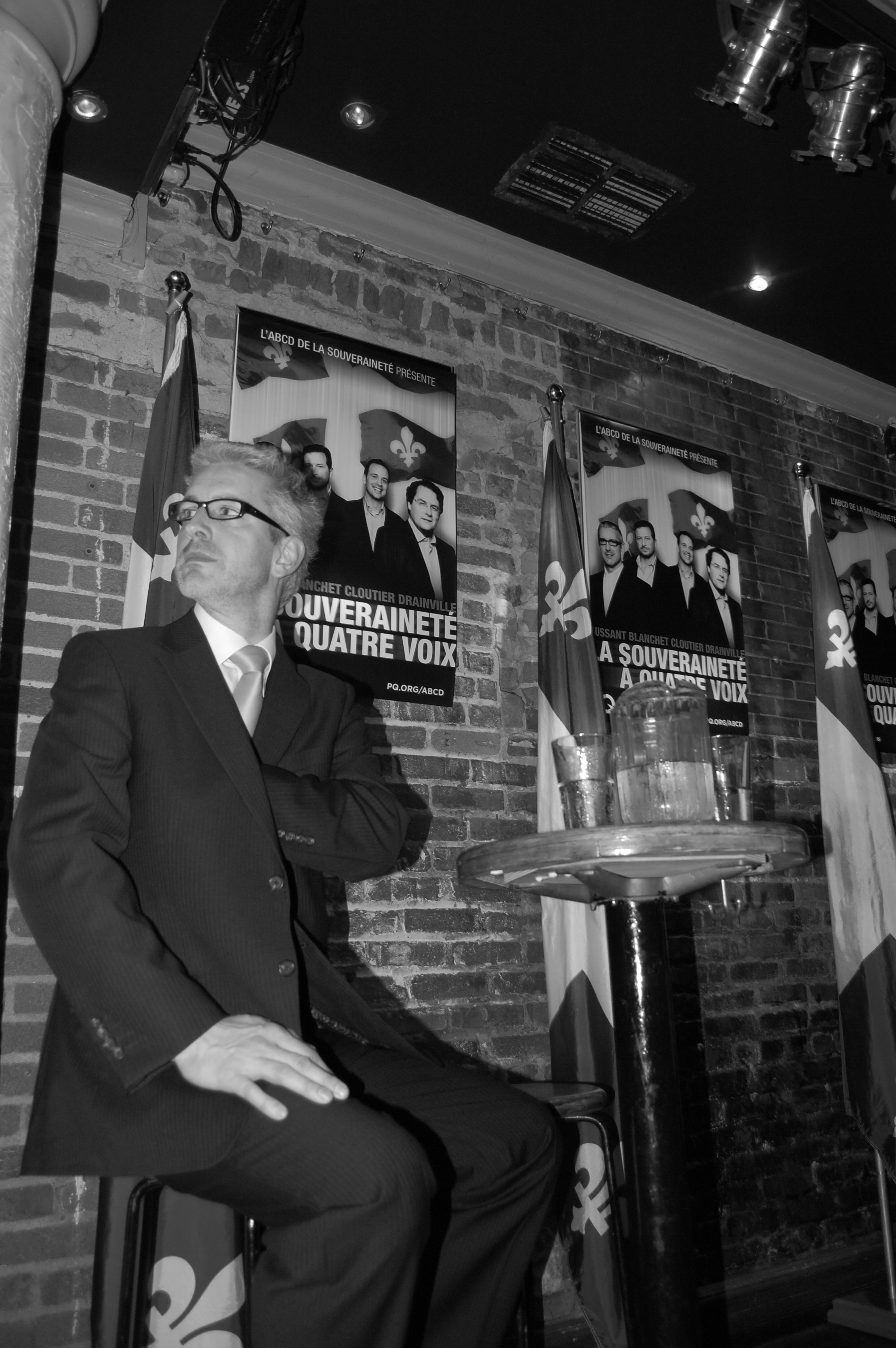
Aussant at a Quebec sovereignty meeting, 2010

=== Parti Québécois member ===
Aussant was elected to the National Assembly of Quebec in the 2008 general election, defeating his Liberal opponent by only 141 votes. This was the second closest result in the province. The Liberals won a majority government across the province under Jean Charest's leadership, and the Parti Québécois formed the official opposition. Aussant was appointed as his party's critic for financial institutions and international commerce and became an opposition representative on the legislative committee on public finances.

He questioned the Charest government's appointment of Michael Sabia as head of the Caisse de dépôt et placement du Québec in May 2009, arguing that Sabia had tried to move BCE Inc.'s upper management and operations from Montreal to Toronto and could not be trusted to represent Quebec's interests. The following year, Aussant accused Sabia of having cost Quebecers $6 billion as the result of a poor risk management strategy.

When Quebec investment advisor Earl Jones was accused of stealing money from his clients in 2009, Aussant called for new legislation requiring financial advisors to register with the province's financial markets authority. He also called for the Charest government to create a parliamentary commission on economic crime.

In 2010, Aussant argued that Quebec could save about $840 million by removing the Canada Revenue Agency from tax collection in Quebec. He later criticized a proposed merger of the London Stock Exchange with the TMX Group, arguing that it would be "a further loss of ground for Quebec." (The TMX Group took over the Montreal Stock Exchange in 2008, through a deal which gave Quebec's Autorité des marchés financiers a say over future changes in the company.)

Aussant was a member of the PQ's hardline indépendantiste or pur et dur wing. Before leaving the party, he founded a video touring series with three other PQ MNAs to promote the benefits of an independent Quebec, called the ABCD (for Aussant, Blanchet, Cloutier, Drainville).

=== Independent ===
On June 7, 2011, Aussant followed caucus-mates Louise Beaudoin, Pierre Curzi, and Lisette Lapointe in resigning from the Parti Québécois caucus. Unlike the first three legislators who criticized PQ leader Pauline Marois for supporting a bill that endorsed a controversial agreement between Quebec City and Quebecor Inc. on the construction of a new arena, Aussant criticized Marois for downplaying Quebec sovereignty and called on her to resign as party leader.

Aussant sat in the legislature as an independent. During this period, he submitted various bills to the National Assembly, including Bill 596 -Act to modernize Quebec’s democratic institutions- covering topics such as the implementation of a proportional electoral system, fixed-date elections, the end of private funding for political parties and the possibility for electors to bring popular initiatives to the National Assembly if the support of at least 5% of the electors is gathered. He dismissed suggestions that he could join a new political movement led by former PQ minister François Legault, stating that he and Legault were on opposite sides of the sovereignty issue and describing Legault's movement as "populism of the worst kind."

=== Option nationale ===
Following his departure from the PQ, Aussant created his own political party, Option nationale, which officially became registered on October 31, 2011. The party proposed to be more committed to Quebec sovereignty than the Parti Québécois, and would seek an electoral mandate for full-fledged autonomy, before a referendum to adopt a new constitution of Quebec as a sovereign nation-state.

During the campaign, Aussant made an effort to appeal to anglophones. He is fluently bilingual in French and English; he recorded a YouTube video in which he argued the sovereigntist case in English. In a turnabout from his pur et dur roots, Aussant took a softer line on the language issue than the PQ. The ON platform encouraged multilingualism, and pushed for greater funding for bilingual programs in provincial schools. This led Dan Delmar of the National Post to praise ON for its "civilized" and "inclusive" approach to sovereigntism.

No Option Nationale candidates were elected in the ensuing election. Aussant came closest to winning; he lost his seat to a Coalition Avenir Québec candidate, but pushed the PQ into fourth place.

On June 19, 2013, Aussant left his role as leader of the party. He stated "family and personal matters" as the official reason. In August of the same year, he announced that he would be leaving Quebec to work once again with Morgan Stanley Capital International in Britain. He noted that he had not received job offers from Quebec employers and speculated that his involvement in the Quebec separatist movement may have been the reason.

=== Return to the Parti Québécois ===
Aussant rejoined the Parti Québécois, and ran as its candidate in the 2018 election in the riding of Pointe-aux-Trembles. However, he was defeated.

== Electoral record ==
2018 Quebec general election: Pointe-aux-Trembles
Party	Candidate	Votes	%	±%
Coalition Avenir Québec	Chantal Rouleau	10,579	38.96	+14.9
Parti Québécois	Jean-Martin Aussant	8,745	32.2	-11.02
Québec solidaire	Céline Pereira	4,036	14.86	+7.08
Liberal	Eric Ouellette	3,410	12.56	-9.84
Bloc Pot	Pierre Surette	218	0.8	
Équipe Autonomiste	Louis Chandonnet	89	0.33	+0.13
Marxist–Leninist	Geneviève Royer	79	0.29	+0
Total valid votes		27,156	97.87	
Total rejected ballots		592	2.13	
Turnout		27,748	67.43	
Eligible voters		41,148		
Coalition Avenir Québec gain from Parti Québécois		Swing		+12.96
Source(s) "Rapport des résultats officiels du scrutin". Élections Québec.

2012 Quebec general election: Nicolet-Bécancour
Party	Candidate	Votes	%
Coalition Avenir Québec	Donald Martel	9,745	32.01
Option nationale	Jean-Martin Aussant	7,869	25.85
Liberal	Marc Descôteaux	6,840	22.47
Parti Québécois	Gilles Mayrand	5,644	18.54
Conservative	Mathieu Benoit	348	1.14
Total valid votes		30,446	98.54
Total rejected ballots		450	1.46
Turnout		30,896	78.61
Electors on the lists		39,304	–

2008 Quebec general election: Nicolet-Yamaska
Party	Candidate	Votes	%	±%
Parti Québécois	Jean-Martin Aussant	8,131	35.24	
Liberal	Mario Landry	7,956	34.48	
Action démocratique	Éric Dorion (incumbent)	6,044	26.20	
Québec solidaire	Marianne Mathis	940	4.07	
Total valid votes		23,071	98.14	
Rejected and declined votes		438	1.86	
Turnout		23,509	67.38	−10.35
Electors on the lists		34,889		
Source: Official Results, Le Directeur général des élections du Québec.
