= St. John the Baptist Cathedral (Nicolet) =

Coordinates: 46.2314°N 72.6129°W

- Cathédrale Saint-Jean-Baptiste de Nicolet
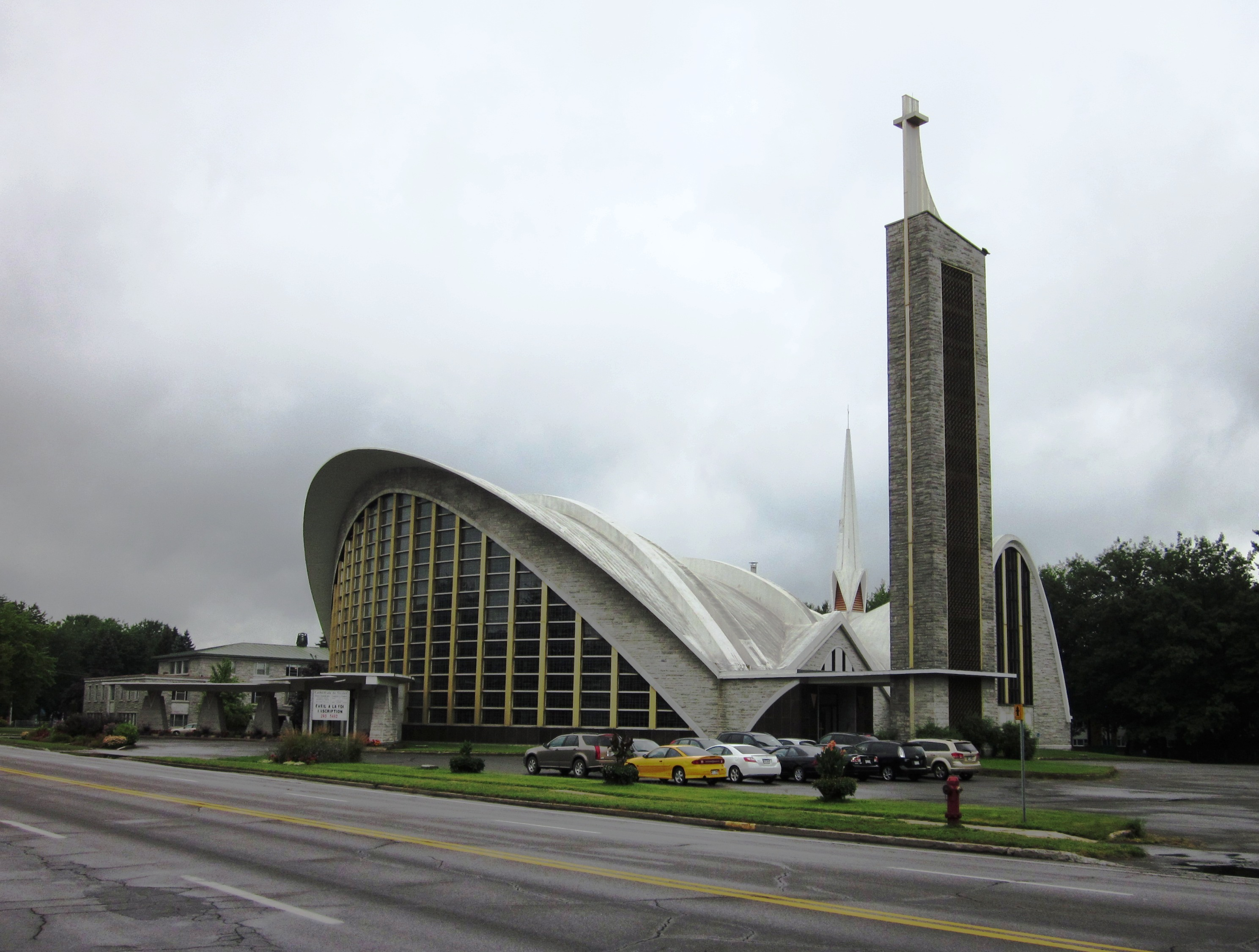
- St. John the Baptist Cathedral
- Location: Nicolet; Quebec
- Country: Canada
- Denomination: Roman Catholic Church

The Cathedral of St. John the Baptist (French: Cathédrale Saint-Jean-Baptiste de Nicolet) also called Nicolet Cathedral is a parish of the Roman Catholic Church and seat of the bishop of the Diocese of Nicolet. It is located in the city of the same name in the province of Quebec, in eastern Canada. The 8th church and 5th cathedral church built since the creation of the parish, the cathedral church is noted for its stained glass windows.

The parish of St. John the Baptist was created in 1702 as a result of the colonization of the lordship of Nicolet (seigneurie de Nicolet). It was elevated to cathedral status upon the erection of the Diocese of Nicolet from the Diocese of Trois-Rivieres in 1885.

On November 12, 1955, a landslide caused damage to the centre of Nicolet. Although the cathedral was saved, it was too close to the accident and was deemed unsafe. Therefore, the present structure was built to replace it, begun 1961 and completed 1963.

On July 12, 2019, some covering material fell from the cathedral's tower. As a precaution, the cathedral stopped ringing its bells and closed the entrance nearest the tower.

== See also ==
- Catholic Church in Canada
