= Guillaume Langlois =

Quebec politician

Guillaume Langlois MNA

Member of the National Assembly for Nicolet-Bécancour
- Incumbent
- Assumed office October 5, 2026
- Preceded by: Donald Martel

Personal details
- Party: Quebec Conservative Party; Option nationale (2012)
- Website: website

Guillaume Langlois is a Quebec politician who was the elected to the National Assembly of Quebec for Nicolet-Bécancour in the 2026 Quebec general election as a member of the Quebec Conservative Party. He is a family physician by profession. He practiced in Bécancour for 20 years.

== Electoral record ==
2026 Quebec general election: Nicolet-Bécancour
** Preliminary results — Not yet official **
Party	Candidate	Votes	%	±%
Conservative	Guillaume Langlois	12,574	41.21	
Parti Québécois	Jérôme Gagnon	8,788	28.80	
Coalition Avenir Québec	Donald Martel	4,988	16.35	
Liberal	Sophie Martinbeault	2,438	7.99	
Québec solidaire	Milan Codebecq-Pérusse	1,364	4.47	
Climat Québec	Marc-Olivier Billette	216	0.71	
Independent	Christian Collard	85	0.28	
Présence	Steve Lauzier	60	0.20	
Total valid votes				
Total rejected ballots				
Turnout			75.20	
Electors on the lists			–	–
Source: Élections Québec

2012 Quebec general election: Jean-Talon
Party	Candidate	Votes	%	
Liberal	Yves Bolduc	13,534	37.31	-12.12
Parti Québécois	Neko Likongo	10,063	27.74	-2.33
Coalition Avenir Québec	Hugues Beaulieu	8,747	24.11	+11.18
Québec solidaire	Emilie Guimond-Bélanger	2,321	6.40	+2.35
Option nationale	Guillaume Langlois	1,351	3.72	–
Équipe Autonomiste	Stéphane Pouleur	262	0.72	–
Total valid votes		36,278	98.92	–
Total rejected ballots		397	1.08	–
Turnout		36,675	80.93	
Electors on the lists		45,317	–	–
