= École nationale de police du Québec =

Coordinates: 46°13′42″N 72°37′02″W

The École nationale de police du Québec (ENPQ) (English: Quebec National Police Academy) is the training academy for police officers in the Canadian province of Quebec. The academy, located in the city of Nicolet, replaced the Institut de police du Québec in 2000. The academy is administered by the Government of Quebec and has an operating budget of C$30 million, 10% of which are subsidies from the government.

Prospective police officers first complete technical training at one of the 12 CEGEPs in the province offering the three-year-long Techniques policières program. After this, they must gain admission to the ENPQ, where they complete 15 weeks of intensive police training before joining a police service.
