= Donald Martel =

Canadian politician

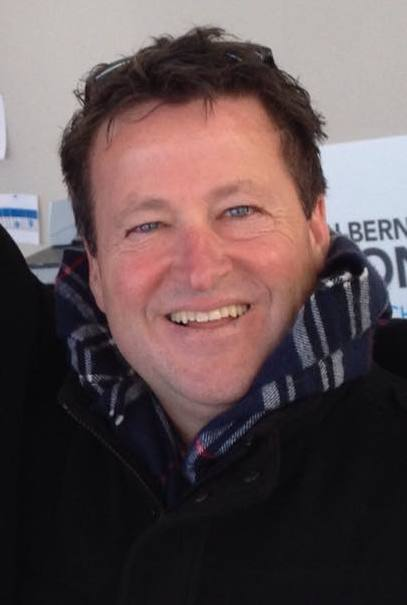
- Donald Martel during the election campaign in Richelieu in February 2015

Member of the National Assembly of Quebec for Nicolet-Bécancour
- In office September 4, 2012 – October 5, 2026
- Premier: François Legault; Christine Fréchette
- Preceded by: Jean-Martin Aussant
- Succeeded by: Guillaume Langlois

Quebec Minister of Agriculture, Fisheries and Food
- In office September 10, 2025 – October 21, 2026
- Preceded by: André Lamontagne
- Succeeded by: Bernard Sévigny

Personal details
- Born: 7 August 1964 (age 62) Grand-Mère, Quebec
- Party: Coalition Avenir Québec; Parti Quebecois (-2008)

Donald Martel is a Canadian politician, who was first elected to the National Assembly of Quebec in the 2012 provincial election. He represented the electoral district of Nicolet-Bécancour as a member of the Coalition Avenir Québec.

Martel has a bachelor's degree in administration. He was selected as both secretary-treasurer and director general of the Nicolet-Yamaska Regional County Municipality (MRC) in 1994, and continues to hold the first position as of 2009. He has also been the responsable administratif for the Centre local de développement (CLD) in Nicolet-Yamaska since 1998. Between 1999 and 2003, he was president of l’Association des directeurs généraux des MRC du Québec. He has also taken part in a local campaign against cannabis.

Martel ran as a Parti Québécois candidate in Nicolet-Yamaska in the 2007 election, finishing second with 7,455 votes (28.32%) against Action démocratique du Québec candidate Éric Dorion. He resigned as president of the local Parti Québécois association in April 2008, arguing that his civic duties were inconsistent with partisan political activity.

== Electoral record ==
2026 Quebec general election: Nicolet-Bécancour
** Preliminary results — Not yet official **
Party	Candidate	Votes	%	±%
Conservative	Guillaume Langlois	12,574	41.21	
Parti Québécois	Jérôme Gagnon	8,788	28.80	
Coalition Avenir Québec	Donald Martel	4,988	16.35	
Liberal	Sophie Martinbeault	2,438	7.99	
Québec solidaire	Milan Codebecq-Pérusse	1,364	4.47	
Climat Québec	Marc-Olivier Billette	216	0.71	
Independent	Christian Collard	85	0.28	
Présence	Steve Lauzier	60	0.20	
Total valid votes				
Total rejected ballots				
Turnout			75.20	
Electors on the lists			–	–
Source: Élections Québec

2022 Quebec general election: Nicolet-Bécancour
Party	Candidate	Votes	%	±%
Coalition Avenir Québec	Donald Martel	13,956	47.05	-8.24
Conservative	Mario Lyonnais	6,595	22.23	+20.19
Parti Québécois	Philippe Dumas	5,095	17.18	+1.46
Québec solidaire	Jacques Thériault Watso	2,610	8.80	-3.54
Liberal	Marie-Josée Jacques	1,406	4.74	-7.83
Total valid votes		29,662	98.38	–
Total rejected ballots		488	1.62	-0.32
Turnout		30,150	72.52	+0.75
Electors on the lists		41,576	–	–
Coalition Avenir Québec hold		Swing		-14.21

2018 Quebec general election: Nicolet-Bécancour
Party	Candidate	Votes	%	±%
Coalition Avenir Québec	Donald Martel	15,562	55.29	+16.65
Parti Québécois	Lucie Allard	4,423	15.71	-6.55
Liberal	Marie-Claude Durand	3,539	12.57	-15.24
Québec solidaire	François Poisson	3,474	12.34	+4.42
Conservative	Jessie Mc Nicoll	576	2.05	+0.54
Green	Vincent Marcotte	403	1.43	–
Bloc Pot	Blak D. Blackburn	170	0.6	–
Total valid votes		28,147	98.06	
Total rejected ballots		556	1.94	
Turnout		28,703	71.77	-2.43
Eligible voters		39,995		
Coalition Avenir Québec hold		Swing		+11.6
Source(s) "Rapport des résultats officiels du scrutin". Élections Québec.

2014 Quebec general election
Party	Candidate	Votes	%	±%
Coalition Avenir Québec	Donald Martel	11,168	38.64	+6.63
Liberal	Denis Vallée	8,038	27.81	+5.34
Parti Québécois	Jean-René Dubois	6,433	22.26	+3.72
Québec solidaire	Marc Dion	2,290	7.92	–
Option nationale	Marjolaine Lachapelle	638	2.21	-23.64
Conservative	Guillaume Laquerre	333	1.15	+0.01
Total valid votes		28,900	98.27	–
Total rejected ballots		510	1.73	–
Turnout		29,410	74.20	-4.41
Electors on the lists		39,638	–	–

2012 Quebec general election
Party	Candidate	Votes	%	±%
Coalition Avenir Québec	Donald Martel	9,745	32.01	+4.65
Option nationale	Jean-Martin Aussant	7,869	25.85	–
Liberal	Marc Descôteaux	6,840	22.47	-11.51
Parti Québécois	Gilles Mayrand	5,644	18.54	-16.24
Conservative	Mathieu Benoit	348	1.14	–
Total valid votes		30,446	98.54	–
Total rejected ballots		450	1.46	–
Turnout		30,896	78.61	
Electors on the lists		39,304	–	–
Coalition Avenir Québec notional gain from Parti Québécois			Swing	+10.44

2007 Quebec general election: Nicolet-Yamaska
Party	Candidate	Votes	%	±%
Action démocratique	Éric Dorion	10,839	41.18	+18.64
Parti Québécois	Donald Martel	7,455	28.32	-12.89
Liberal	Yves Baril	6,770	25.72	-8.40
Québec solidaire	Jean Proulx	1,121	4.26	
Independent	Simonne Lizotte	138	0.52	-0.02
Total valid votes		26,323	98.73	
Rejected and declined votes		339	1.27	
Turnout		26,662	77.73	
Electors on the lists		34,301		
Source: Official Results, Le Directeur général des élections du Québec.
