= Diocese of Nicolet =

Catholic ecclesiastical territory

Diocese of Nicolet Dioecesis Nicoletana
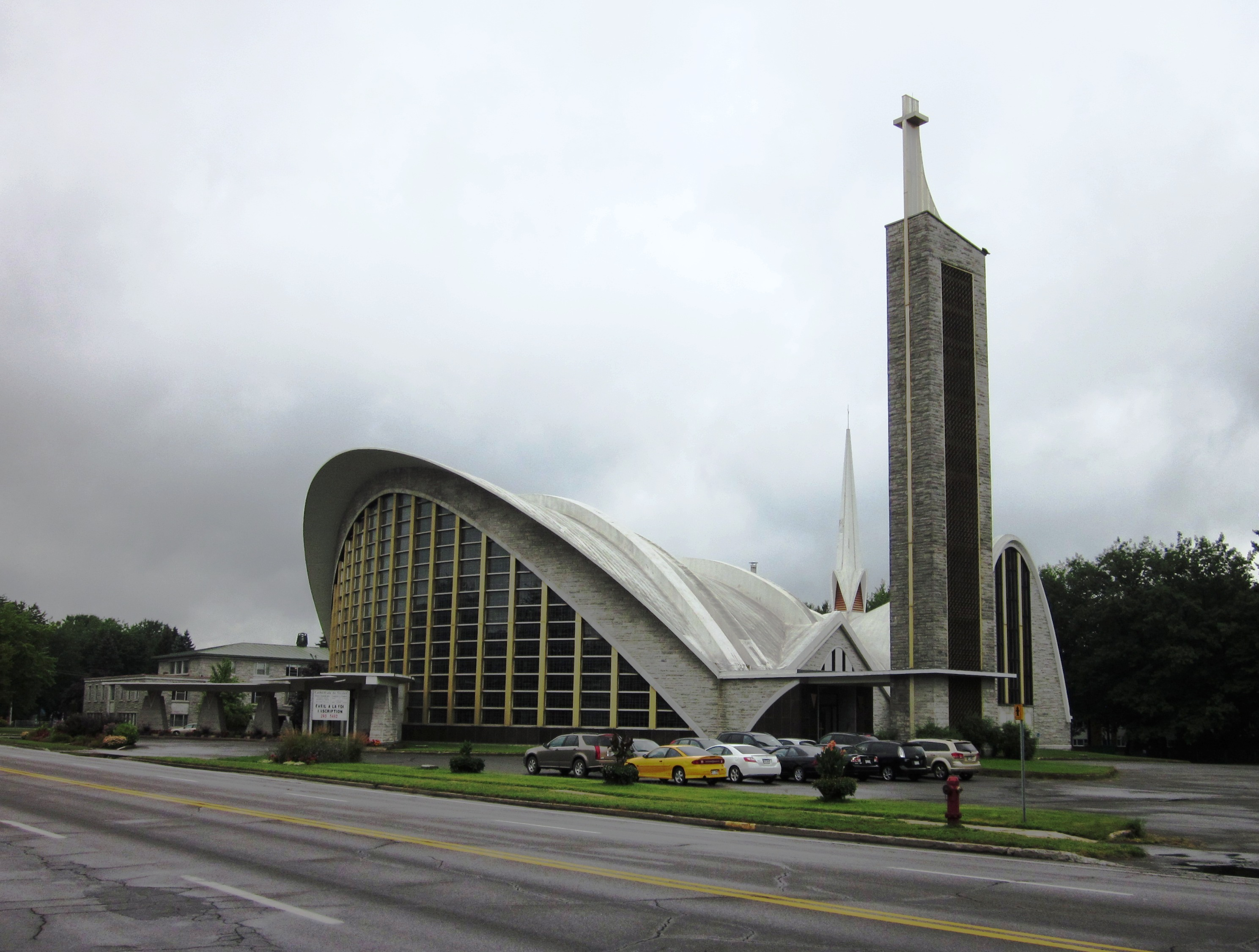
- Saint-Jean-Baptiste Cathedral

- Logo of the Diocese

Location
- Country: Canada
- Ecclesiastical province: Quebec
- Population: 189,900 (98.0%)

Information
- Denomination: Roman Catholic
- Rite: Roman Rite
- Established: 10 July 1885
- Cathedral: St. John the Baptist Cathedral, Nicolet

Current leadership
- Pope: Leo XIV
- Bishop: Daniel Jodoin
- Metropolitan Archbishop: Guy Boulanger
- Bishops emeritus: André Gazaille

Website
- http://www.diocesenicolet.qc.ca/

The Roman Catholic Diocese of Nicolet (Latin: Dioecesis Nicoletana) (erected 10 July 1885) is a suffragan of the Archdiocese of Sherbrooke, Quebec, Canada.

== Cathedral ==
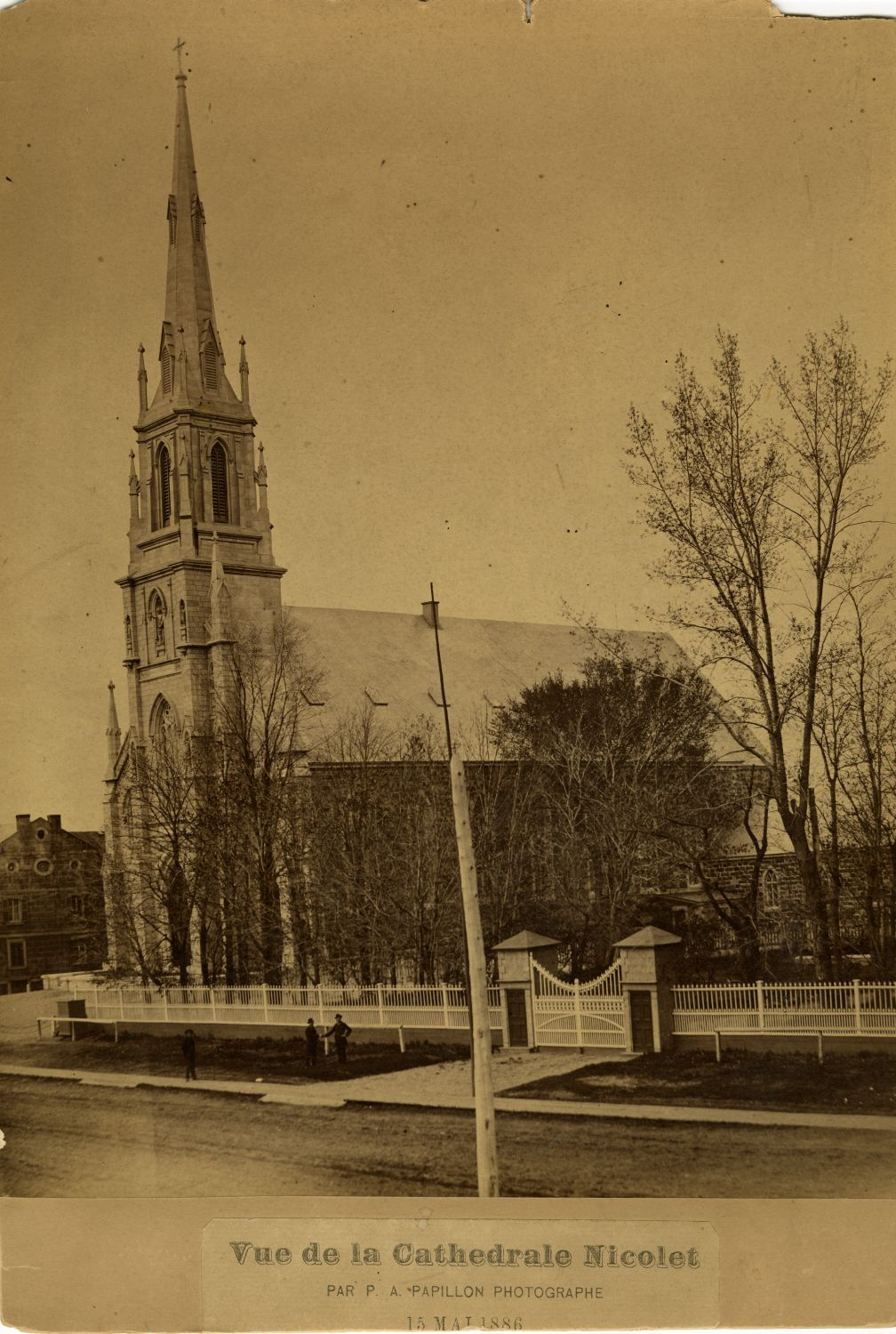
Saint-Jean-Baptiste Cathedral in 1886

The seat of the bishop (or "ordinary") is the Cathedral of St. Jean-Baptiste, a spectacular building opened in 1963, which seats 1,200 worshippers and features extensive stained glass as well as other artwork by a number of local artists. The present building is the fifth cathedral, successor to four previous buildings that fell victim to various physical disasters: two collapses, a fire, and damage from the Nicolet landslide of 1955. A frieze of stained glass in the apse shows characters from the Bible and from the history of the Christian church, including a portrait of Bishop Martin, who was responsible for construction of the new building.

== Bishops ==
=== Ordinaries ===
- Elphège Gravel (1885 – 1904)
- Joseph-Simon-Herman Brunault (1904 – 1937)
- Albini Lafortune (1938 – 1950)
- Joseph Albertus Martin (1950 – 1989)
- Raymond Saint-Gelais (1989 – 2011)
- André Gazaille (2011 – 2022)
- Daniel Jodoin (2022 – )

=== Coadjutor bishops ===
- Joseph-Simon-Herman Brunault (1899-1904)
- Joseph Albertus Martin (1950)
- Raymond Saint-Gelais (1988-1989)

=== Other priest of this diocese who became bishop ===
- Joseph-Roméo Gagnon, appointed Bishop of Edmundston, New Brunswick in 1949

== Bibliography ==
- "Diocese of Nicolet". Catholic-Hierarchy.
- Brunault, Joseph Simon Herman (1911). "Diocese of Nicolet" . In Herbermann, Charles (ed.). Catholic Encyclopedia. Vol. 11. New York: Robert Appleton Company.
