= Maddington Falls =

- Municipality
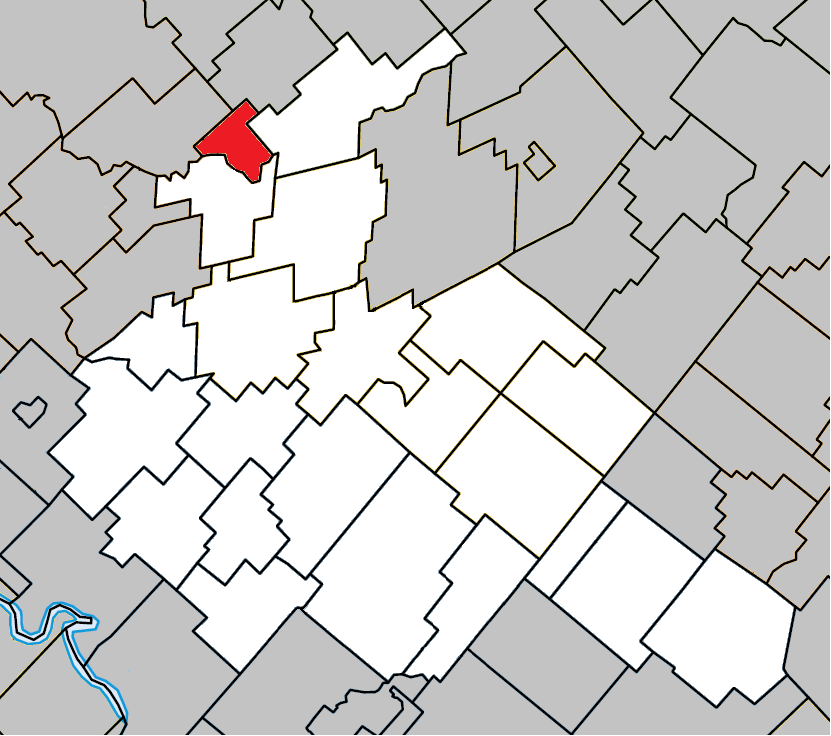
- Location within Arthabaska RCM.

- Location in southern Quebec.
- Coordinates: 46°13′N 72°08′W
- Country: Canada
- Province: Quebec
- Region: Centre-du-Québec
- RCM: Arthabaska
- Constituted: January 11, 1902
- Named for: Maddington, Wiltshire

Government
  - Mayor: Éric Girard
  - Federal riding: Richmond—Arthabaska—des-Sources
  - Prov. riding: Nicolet-Bécancour

Area
  - Total: 24.30 km^{2} (9.38 sq mi)
  - Land: 23.85 km^{2} (9.21 sq mi)

Population (2011)
  - Total: 443
  - Density: 18.6/km^{2} (48/sq mi)
  - Pop 2006-2011: ▲7.5%
- Time zone: UTC−5 (EST)
  - Summer (DST): UTC−4 (EDT)
- Postal code(s): G0Z 1C0
- Area code: 819
- Highways: R-261
- Website: www.maddington.ca

Maddington Falls, Quebec is a municipality in the Centre-du-Québec region of Quebec, Canada.
