= Éric Dorion =

Canadian politician (born 1970)

MNA for Nicolet-Yamaska
- In office April 25, 2007 – November 5, 2008
- Preceded by: Michel Morin
- Succeeded by: Jean-Martin Aussant

Personal details
- Born: June 24, 1970 (age 55) Drummondville, Quebec, Canada
- Party: Action démocratique du Québec
- Spouse: Gina Bilodeau

Éric Dorion (born June 2, 1970) is an administrator and politician in the Canadian province of Quebec. He served in the National Assembly of Quebec from 2007 to 2008, representing Nicolet-Yamaska as a member of the Action démocratique du Québec (ADQ).

== Early life and career ==
Dorion was born in Drummondville, Quebec, and by his own admission had a troubled early life. He received a two-year suspended sentence for illegal possession of a vehicle in 1992, at a time when he was battling drug and alcohol addiction. He has also admitted to having written false cheques in this period. He later regained control of his life and began working for the treatment and prevention of drug addiction; he founded the intervention centre "De l'autre côté de l'ombre" in 1996 and served as its president and director until his election to the Quebec legislature. He also completed a training program in drug addiction and psychology at the Université du Québec à Trois-Rivières in 1997–98.

In his spare time, he has been a minor league hockey coach in Bécancour.

== Legislator ==
Dorion was elected to the National Assembly of Quebec in the 2007 general election, winning a seat that was previously held by the Parti Québécois. His criminal background was discovered by the media during the campaign and was reported in newspapers across Canada; he initially denied having a police record, but acknowledged the truth when presented with incontrovertible evidence. ADQ leader Mario Dumont accused the media of conducting a "witch hunt" against Dorion, who he said had turned his life around several years earlier. After his election, Dorion said that his top priority would be preventing drug addiction.

The Quebec Liberal Party formed a minority government after the 2007 election, and the ADQ became the official opposition in the National Assembly. Dorion was appointed as his party's critic for social solidarity. As a legislator, he took part in all-party efforts to ensure that future Quebec legislation would be free of homophobia. He later helped promote his party's controversial social security reforms in the 2008 Quebec election.

Dorion was personally defeated in 2008, finishing third against Parti Québécois candidate Jean-Martin Aussant amidst a provincial swing away from the ADQ. He returned to work at "De l'autre côté de l'ombre" after the election.

== Electoral record ==
2008 Quebec general election: Nicolet-Yamaska
Party	Candidate	Votes	%	±%
Parti Québécois	Jean-Martin Aussant	8,131	35.24	
Liberal	Mario Landry	7,956	34.48	
Action démocratique	Éric Dorion (incumbent)	6,044	26.20	
Québec solidaire	Marianne Mathis	940	4.07	
Total valid votes		23,071	98.14	
Rejected and declined votes		438	1.86	
Turnout		23,509	67.38	−10.35
Electors on the lists		34,889		
Source: Official Results, Le Directeur général des élections du Québec.

2007 Quebec general election: Nicolet-Yamaska
Party	Candidate	Votes	%	±%
Action démocratique	Éric Dorion	10,839	41.18	
Parti Québécois	Donald Martel	7,455	28.32	
Liberal	Yves Baril	6,770	25.72	
Québec solidaire	Jean Proulx	1,121	4.26	
Independent	Simonne Lizotte	138	0.52	
Total valid votes		26,323	98.73	
Rejected and declined votes		339	1.27	
Turnout		26,662	77.73	
Electors on the lists		34,301		
Source: Official Results, Le Directeur général des élections du Québec.
