= Michel Morin =

Canadian politician

Michel Morin (born March 27, 1948) is a Canadian politician. He was a three-term member of the National Assembly of Quebec, a parliamentary assistant from 1999 to 2001, and whip of the Parti Québécois from 2001 to 2007.

== Background ==
He was born on March 27, 1948, in Saint-Célestin, Centre-du-Québec and made career in education. Before he ran for office, he was a political activist with the Progressive Conservative Party, the Bloc Québécois and the Parti Québécois. He was the protégé of politician Louis Plamondon.

== Political career ==
Morin successfully ran as the Parti Québécois candidate to the National Assembly of Quebec in the 1994 election in the district of Nicolet-Yamaska. He was re-elected in the 1989 and 1994 elections.

In 1999, Morin was appointed parliamentary assistant, a position he held until 2001. He also served as his party's House Whip from 2001 to 2007.

Morin did not run for re-election in the 2007 election.

== Electoral record ==
2003 Quebec general election: Nicolet-Yamaska
Party	Candidate	Votes	%	±%
Parti Québécois	Michel Morin	10,783	41.21	
Liberal	Jean Rousseau	8,927	34.12	
Action démocratique	Lise Blanchette	5,899	22.54	
Bloc Pot	Blak D. Blackburn	417	1.59	
Independent	Simonne Lizotte	141	0.54	
Total valid votes		26,167	98.49	
Rejected and declined votes		401	1.51	
Turnout		26,568	77.82	
Electors on the lists		34,140		
Source: Official Results, Le Directeur général des élections du Québec.

1998 Quebec general election: Nicolet-Yamaska
Party	Candidate	Votes	%	±%
Parti Québécois	Michel Morin	14,166	50.23	
Liberal	Daniel McMahon	10,369	36.77	
Action démocratique	Frédéric Lajoie	3,509	12.44	
Socialist Democracy	Robert Poirier	157	0.56	
Total valid votes		28,201	98.70	
Rejected and declined votes		372	1.30	
Turnout		28,573	84.59	
Electors on the lists		33,777		
Source: Official Results, Le Directeur général des élections du Québec.

1994 Quebec general election: Nicolet-Yamaska
Party	Candidate	Votes	%	±%
Parti Québécois	Michel Morin	13,427	50.13	+14.67
Liberal	Maurice Richard	12,520	46.74	−13.40
Natural Law	Jacques Houde	840	3.14	
Total valid votes		26,787	100.00	
Rejected and declined votes		816		
Turnout		27,603	84.85	+3.84
Electors on the lists		32,530		
Source: Official Results, Le Directeur général des élections du Québec.

== Footnotes ==
National Assembly of Quebec
Preceded by Maurice Richard (Liberal)	MNA for Nicolet-Yamaska; 1994–2007	Succeeded by Éric Dorion (ADQ)
