= Quebec Route 261 =

Highway in Quebec, Canada

Route 261

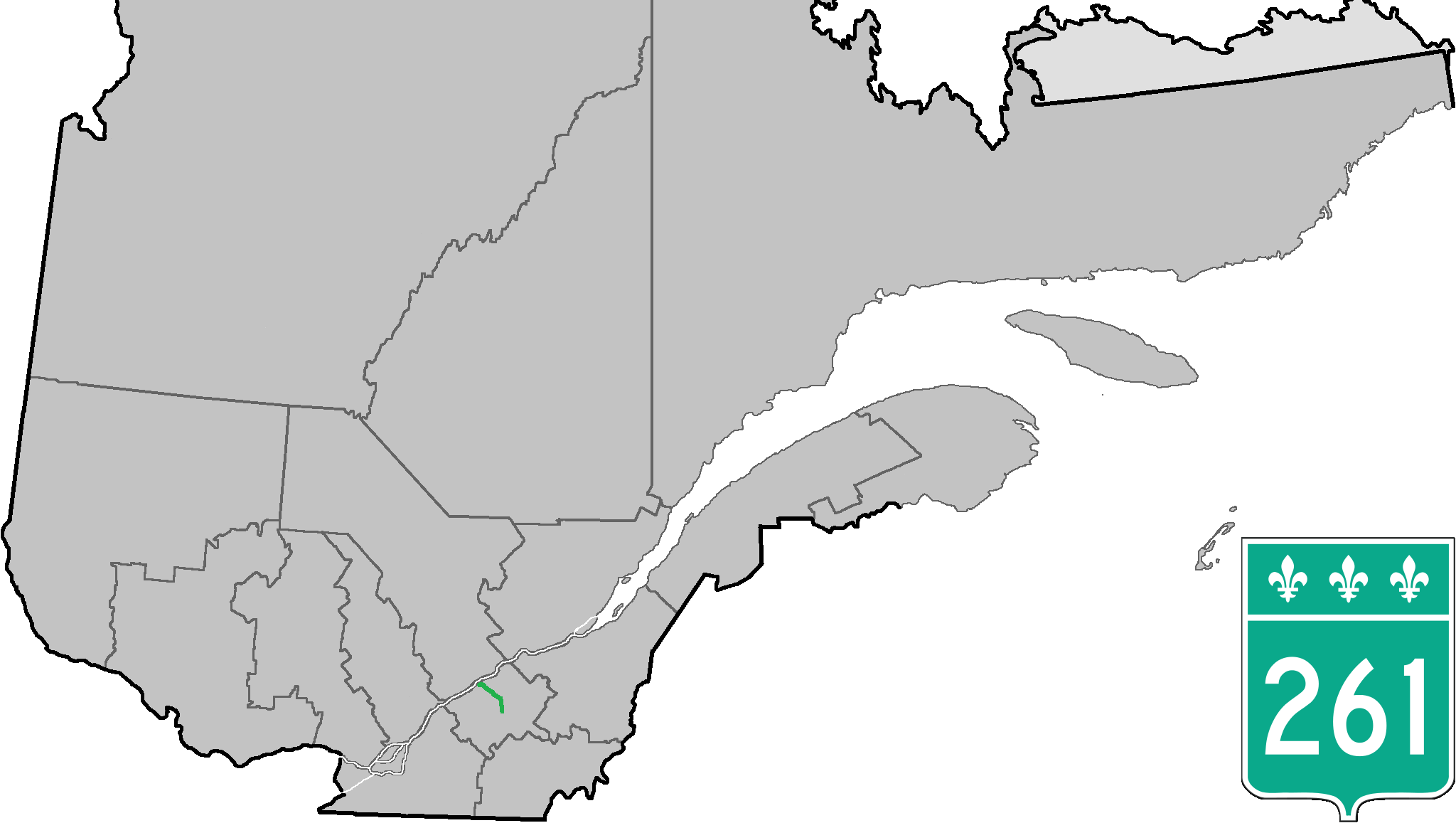

Route information
- Length: 37 km (23 mi)

Major junctions
- South end: R-161 near Saint-Valere
- A-20 (TCH) in Daveluyville
- North end: R-132 near Becancour

Location
- Country: Canada
- Province: Quebec
- Major cities: Becancour, Daveluyville

Highway system
- Quebec provincial highways; Autoroutes; List; Former
← R-259	→ R-263

Route 261 is a north/south highway on the south shore of the Saint Lawrence River in Quebec, Canada. Its northern terminus is in Bécancour (south of Trois-Rivières) at the junction of Route 132 and its southern terminus is in Saint-Valère at the junction of Route 161.

== Towns along Route 261 ==
- Becancour
- Saint-Sylvere
- Maddington Falls
- Daveluyville
- Saint-Valere
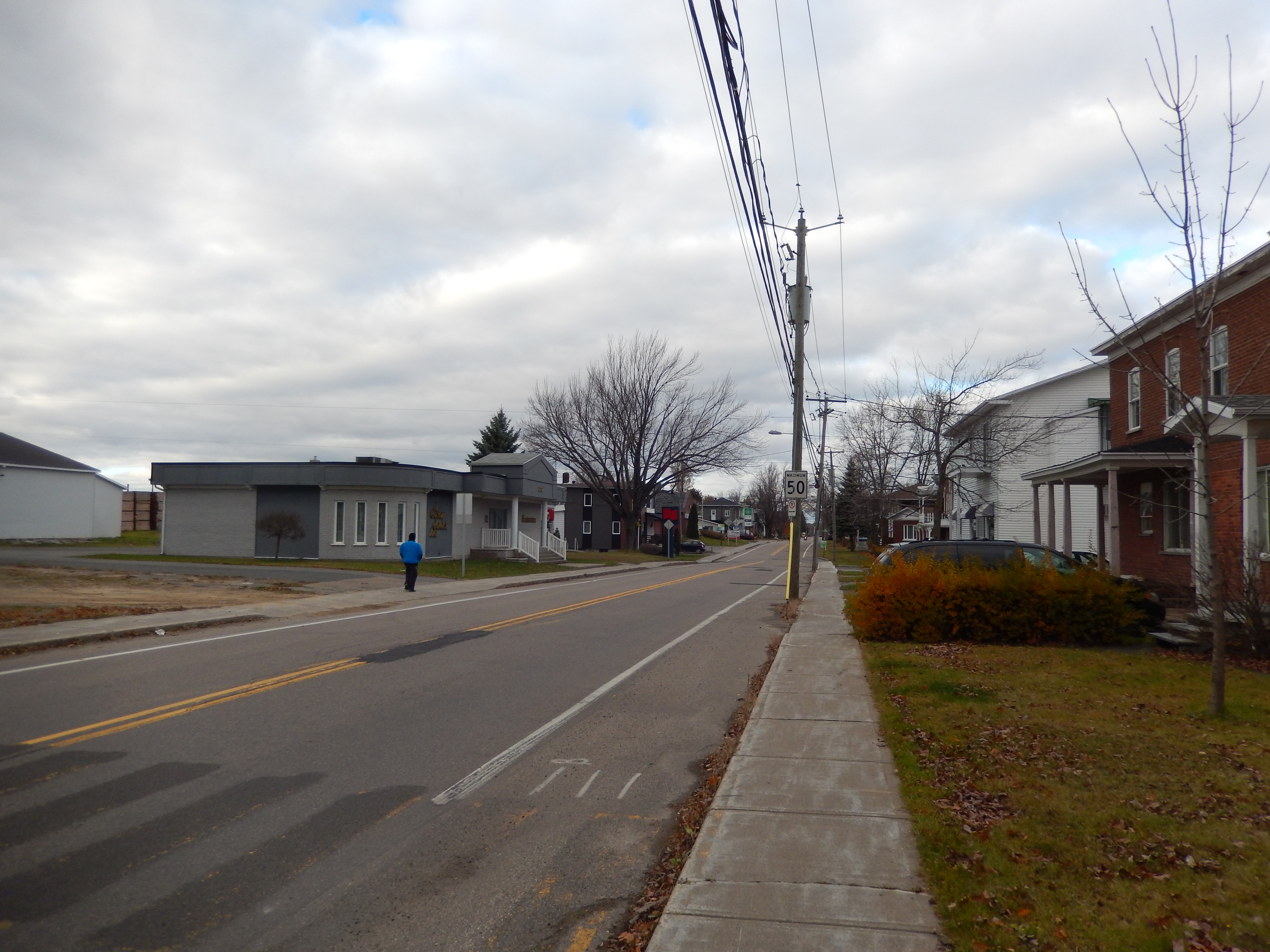
Route 261 in Daveluyville.

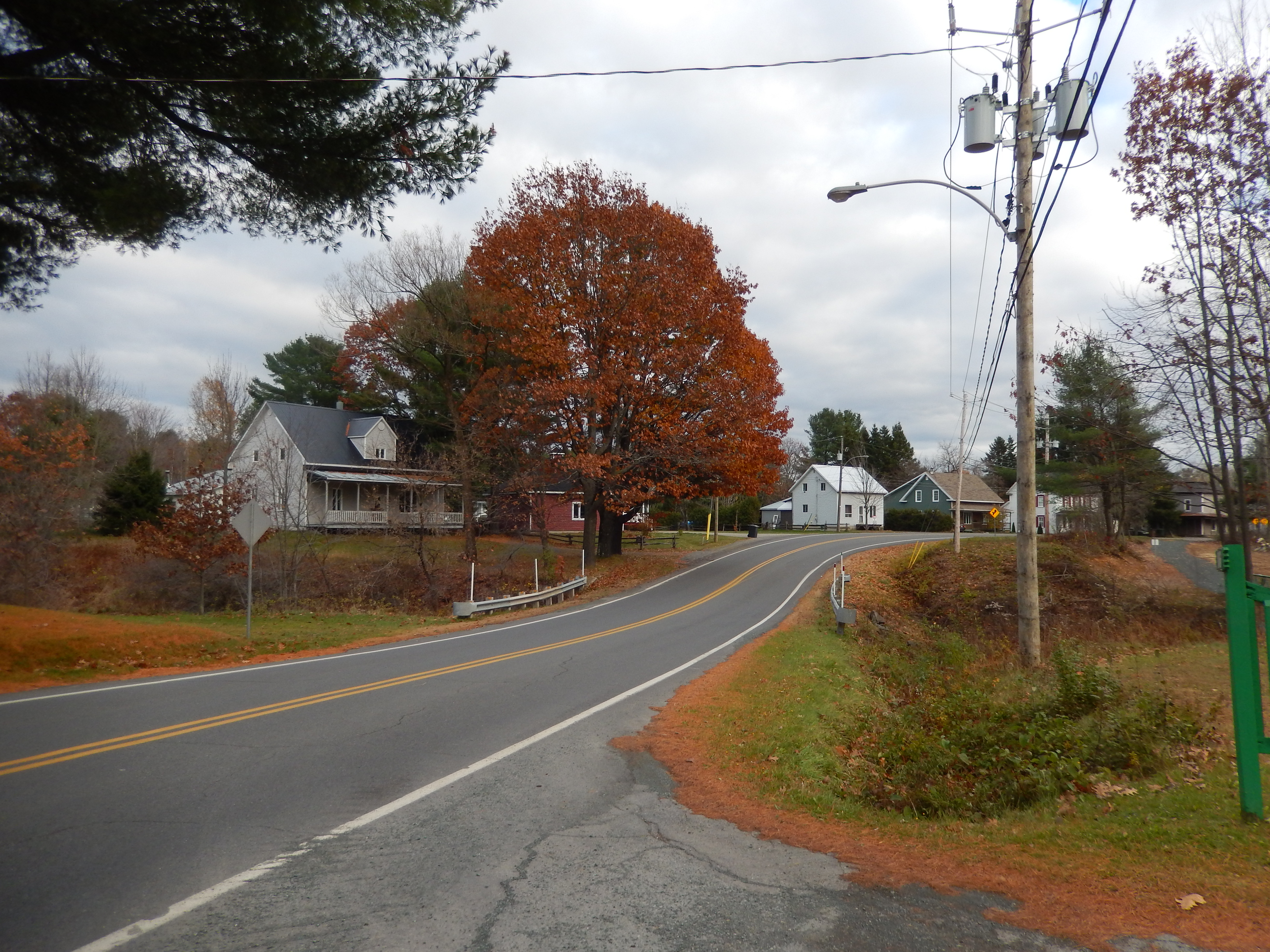
Route 261 in Maddington Falls.

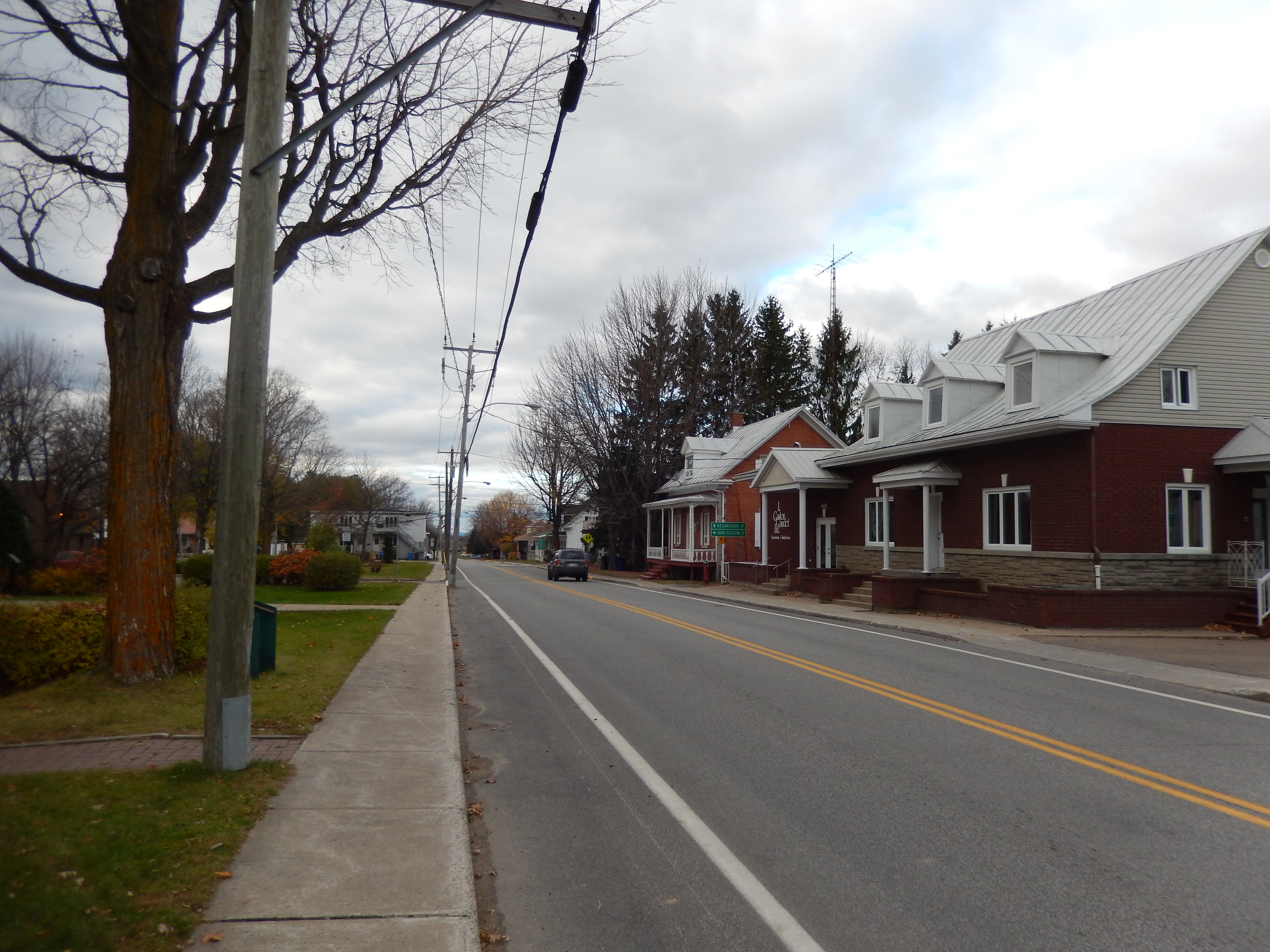
Intersection with Route 226 in Bécancour.

== See also ==
- List of Quebec provincial highways
