= Saint-Célestin, Quebec (municipality) =

Saint-Célestin
- Municipality
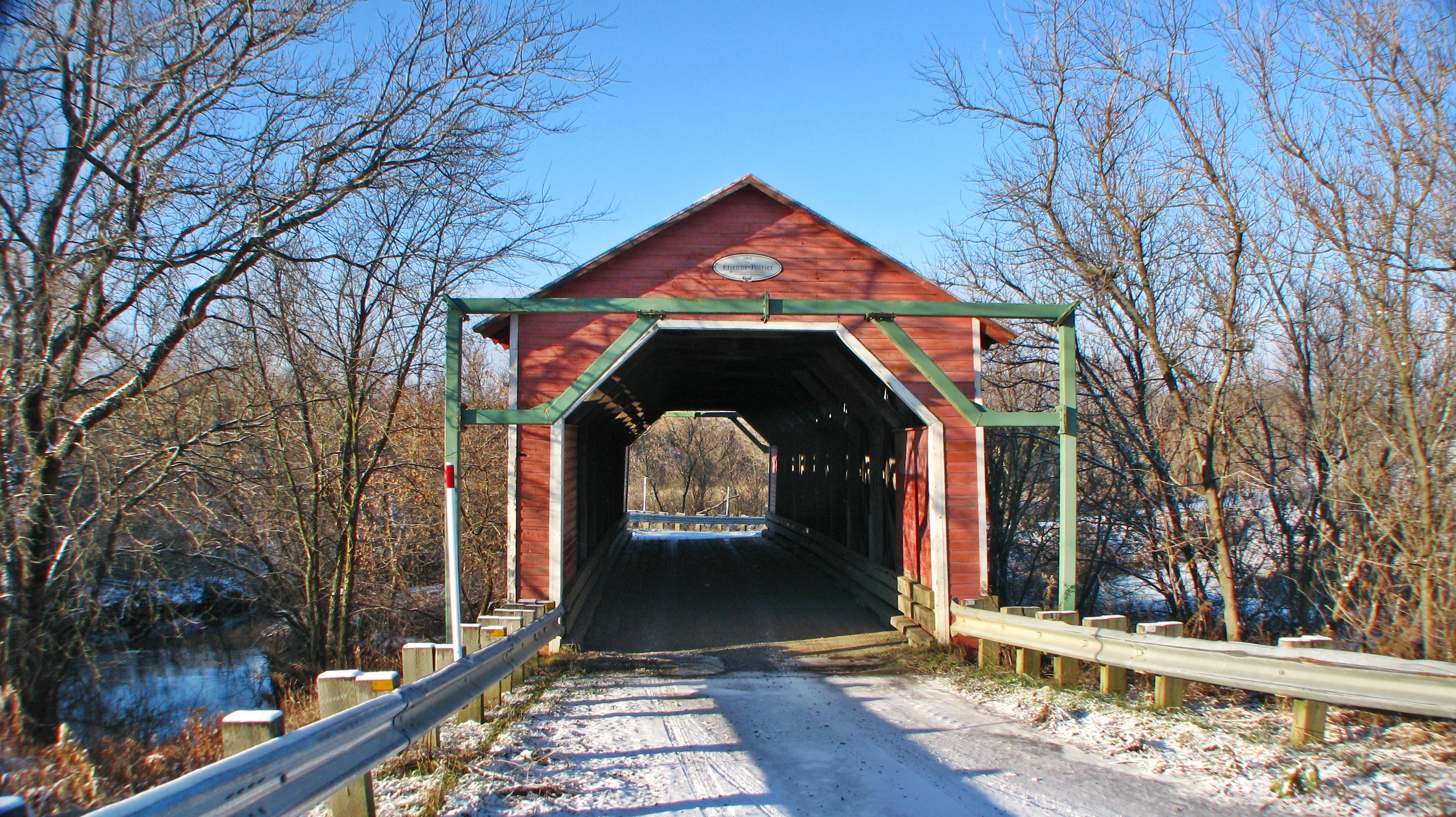

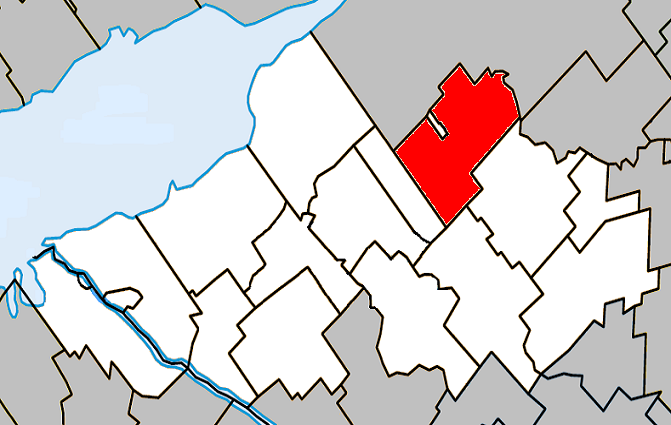
- Location within Nicolet-Yamaska RCM.

- Location in southern Quebec.
- Coordinates: 46°13′N 72°26′W
- Country: Canada
- Province: Quebec
- Region: Centre-du-Québec
- RCM: Nicolet-Yamaska
- Constituted: July 1, 1864

Government
  - Mayor: Sandra St-Amour-Moreau
  - Federal riding: Bécancour—Nicolet—Saurel—Alnôbak
  - Prov. riding: Nicolet-Bécancour

Area
  - Total: 77.70 km^{2} (30.00 sq mi)
  - Land: 76.99 km^{2} (29.73 sq mi)

Population (2021)
  - Density: 7.7/km^{2} (20/sq mi)
  - Pop 2016-2021: ▲3.3%
  - Dwellings: 260
- Time zone: UTC−5 (EST)
  - Summer (DST): UTC−4 (EDT)
- Postal code(s): J0C 1G0
- Area code: 819
- Highways A-55: R-155; R-161; R-226
- Website: www.saint-celestin.net

Saint-Célestin (French pronunciation: [sɛ̃ selɛstɛ̃]) is a municipality in Quebec, in the Nicolet-Yamaska Regional County Municipality of the Centre-du-Québec region.

While the municipality surrounds it on most sides, the village of Saint-Célestin also borders the city of Bécancour thus making it not an enclave.

== Demographics ==
=== Population ===
Population trend:

Census	Population	Change (%)
2021	594	▲3.3%
2016	575	▼5.9%
2011	611	▼2.1%
2006	624	▼3.4%
2001	647	▼3.4%
1996	670	▼9.1%
1991	737	▼0.9%
1986	744	▲2.2%
1981	728	▲6.9%
1976	681	▼8.8%
1971	747	▼10.5%
1966	835	▼13.9%
1961	970	▼6.2%
1956	1,034	▲1.4%
1951	1,020	▼4.7%
1941	1,070	▼3.4%
1931	1,108	▼2.4%
1921	1,135	▼17.8%
1911	1,380	▲4.5%
1901	1,320	▼13.8%
1891	1,532	▼7.5%
1881	1,656	▲2.9%
1871	1,609	N/A

== See also ==
- List of municipalities in Quebec
