= Aston-Jonction =

- Municipality
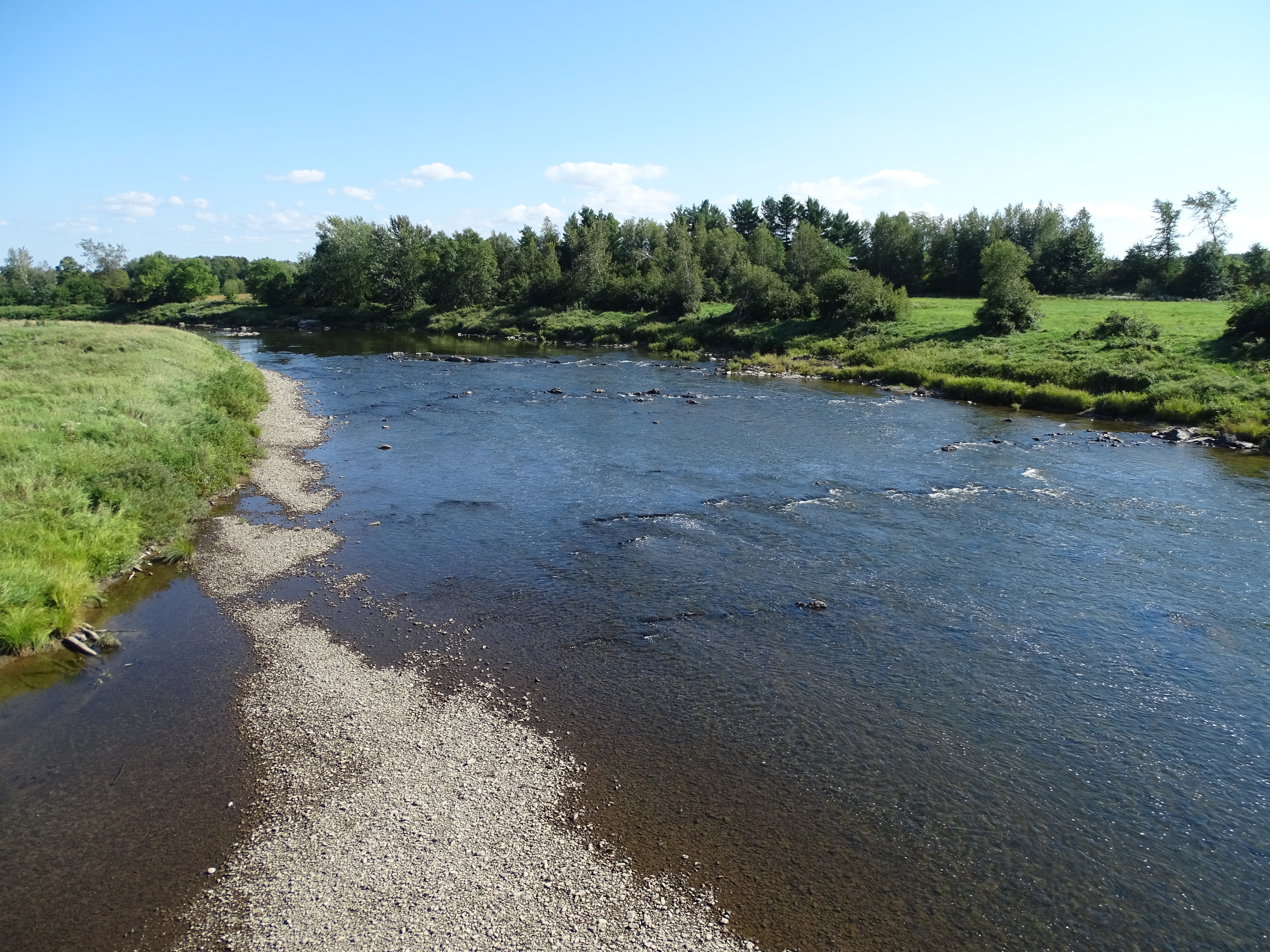
- Motto: Travailler et bâtir ensemble ("To Work and Build Together")
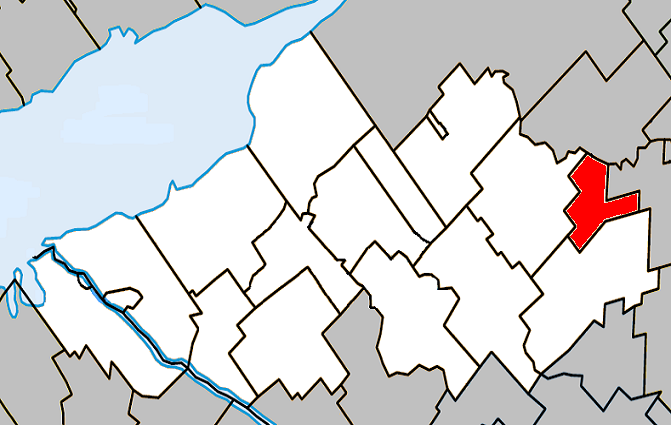
- Location within Nicolet-Yamaska RCM.

- Location in southern Quebec.
- Coordinates: 46°10′N 72°14′W
- Country: Canada
- Province: Quebec
- Region: Centre-du-Québec
- RCM: Nicolet-Yamaska
- Constituted: March 26, 1997

Government
  - Mayor: Christine Gaudet
  - Federal riding: Bécancour—Nicolet—Saurel—Alnôbak
  - Prov. riding: Nicolet-Bécancour

Area
  - Total: 25.90 km^{2} (10.00 sq mi)
  - Land: 26.20 km^{2} (10.12 sq mi)
- There is an apparent contradiction between two authoritative sources

Population (2021)
  - Total: 441
  - Density: 16.8/km^{2} (44/sq mi)
  - Pop 2016-2021: ▲4%
  - Dwellings: 180
- Time zone: UTC−5 (EST)
  - Summer (DST): UTC−4 (EDT)
- Postal code(s): G0Z 1A0
- Area code: 819
- Highways: No major routes
- Website: www.aston-jonction.ca

Aston-Jonction (French pronunciation: [astɔn ʒɔ̃ksjɔ̃]), formerly known in English as Aston Junction, is a municipality in the Centre-du-Québec region of the province of Quebec, Canada. The population as of the Canada 2021 Census was 441.

== Demographics ==
=== Population ===
Population trend:

| Census | Population | Change (%) |
|---|---|---|
| 2021 | 441 | ▲4% |
| 2016 | 424 | ▲3.4% |
| 2011 | 410 | ▲8.8% |
| 2006 | 377 | ▼8.9% |
| 2001 | 414 | N/A |

=== Language ===
Mother tongue language (2021)

| Language | Population | Pct (%) |
|---|---|---|
| French only | 430 | 97.7% |
| English only | 5 | 1.1% |
| Both English and French | 0 | 0.0% |
| Other languages | 5 | 1.1% |

== Infrastructure ==
The Aston Junction railway station of Canadian National Railway was served by The Scotian passenger train in 1954. It was 88.8 miles by rail from Montreal.

== See also ==
- List of municipalities in Quebec
