= Saint-Célestin, Quebec (village) =

Saint-Célestin (village) Formerly Annaville
- Village municipality
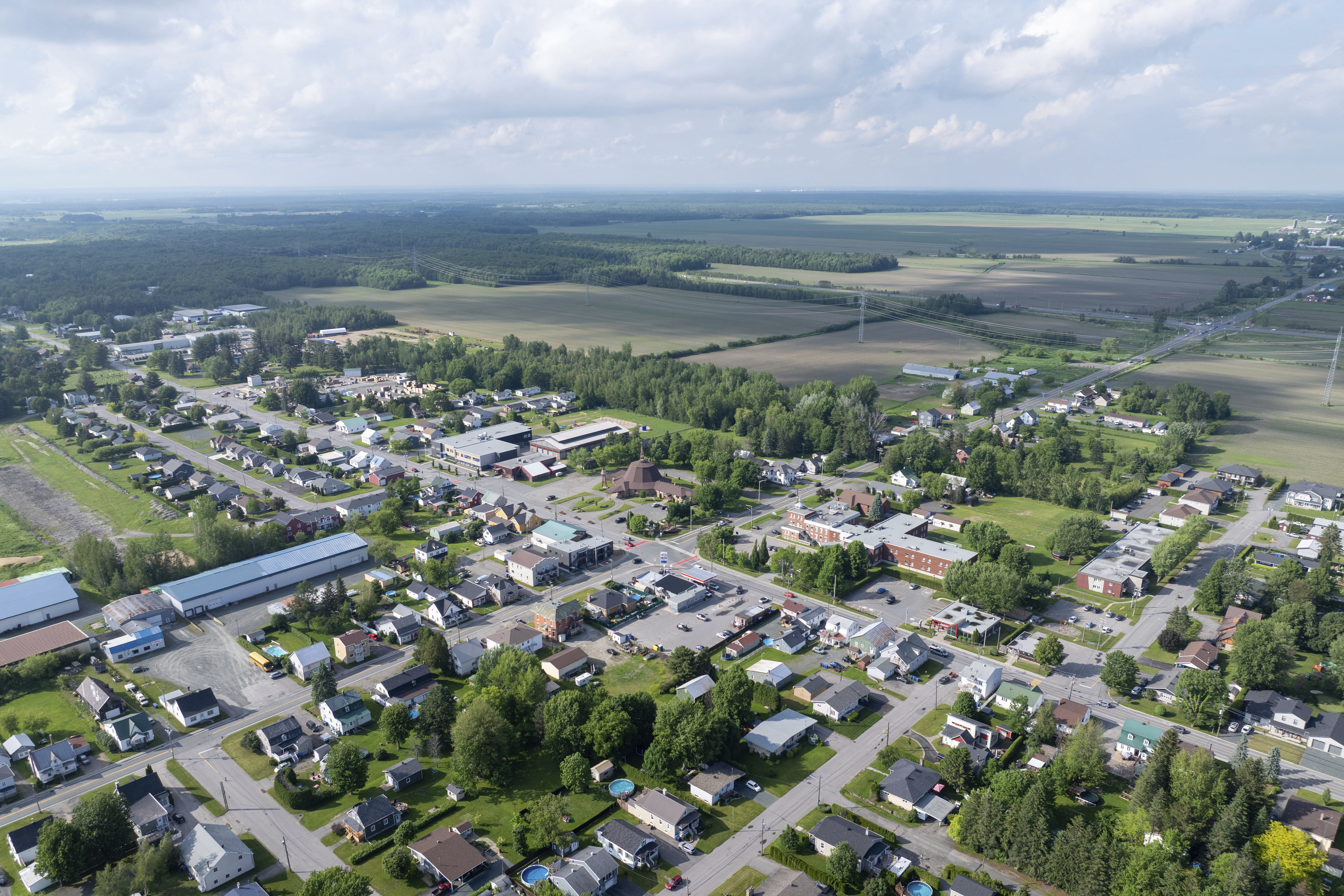
- Saint-Célestin in 2026

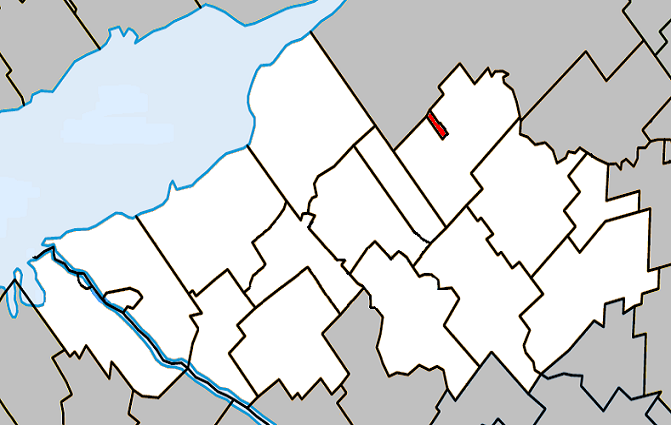
- Location within Nicolet-Yamaska RCM.

- Location in southern Quebec.
- Coordinates: 46°13′N 72°26′W
- Country: Canada
- Province: Quebec
- Region: Centre-du-Québec
- RCM: Nicolet-Yamaska
- Constituted: November 25, 1896
- Named for: Pope Celestine V

Government
  - Mayor: Raymond Noël
  - Federal riding: Bécancour—Nicolet—Saurel—Alnôbak
  - Prov. riding: Nicolet-Bécancour

Area
  - Total: 1.50 km^{2} (0.58 sq mi)
  - Land: 1.41 km^{2} (0.54 sq mi)

Population (2016)
  - Total: 831
  - Density: 587.5/km^{2} (1,522/sq mi)
  - Pop 2011-2016: ▲6.4%
  - Dwellings: 385
- Time zone: UTC−5 (EST)
  - Summer (DST): UTC−4 (EDT)
- Postal code(s): J0C 1G0
- Area code: 819
- Highways: R-226
- Census profile: 2450030
- MAMROT info: 50030
- Toponymie info: 259388
- Website: www.village- st-celestin.net

Saint-Célestin (French pronunciation: [sɛ̃ selɛstɛ̃]) is a village municipality in the Nicolet-Yamaska Regional County Municipality in the Centre-du-Québec region of the province of Quebec in Canada.

It is mostly surrounded by the municipality that is also called Saint-Célestin, and it also borders the city of Bécancour to the northwest.

== Demographics ==
In the 2021 Census of Population conducted by Statistics Canada, Saint-Célestin had a population of 892 living in 382 of its 403 total private dwellings, a change of 7.3% from its 2016 population of 831. With a land area of 1.41 km^{2} (0.54 sq mi), it had a population density of 632.6/km^{2} (1,638.5/sq mi) in 2021.

Population trend:

Census	Population	Change (%)
2016	831	▲6.4%
2011	781	▲2.5%
2006	762	▲3.4%
2001	737	▼2.5%
1996	756	▲2.9%
1991	735	N/A

== Notable residents ==
- Louis Bourgeois (1856–1930), architect and designer of the Bahá'í House of Worship in Wilmette, Illinois, was born in Saint-Célestin-de-Nicolet, Quebec on March 19, 1856.

== See also ==
- List of village municipalities in Quebec
