= Saint-Wenceslas, Quebec =

Saint-Wenceslas
- Municipality
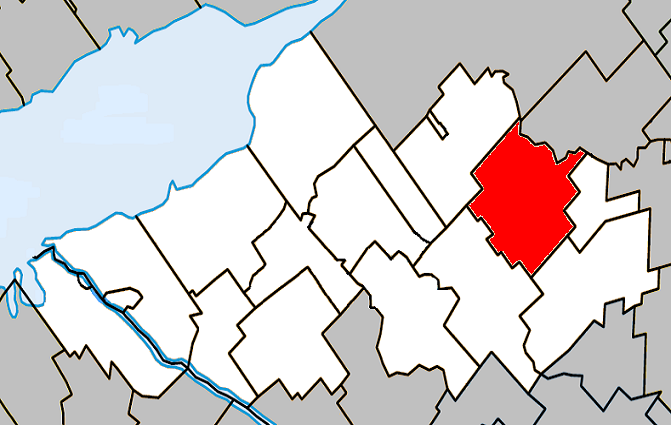
- Location within Nicolet-Yamaska RCM.

- Location in southern Quebec.
- Coordinates: 46°10′N 72°20′W
- Country: Canada
- Province: Quebec
- Region: Centre-du-Québec
- RCM: Nicolet-Yamaska
- Constituted: October 11, 1995
- Named for: Wenceslaus I, Duke of Bohemia

Government
  - Mayor: Martine Bechtold
  - Federal riding: Bécancour—Nicolet—Saurel—Alnôbak
  - Prov. riding: Nicolet-Bécancour

Area
  - Total: 79.70 km^{2} (30.77 sq mi)
  - Land: 79.57 km^{2} (30.72 sq mi)

Population (2021)
  - Total: 1,167
  - Density: 14.7/km^{2} (38/sq mi)
  - Pop 2016-2021: ▲0.9%
  - Dwellings: 551
- Time zone: UTC−5 (EST)
  - Summer (DST): UTC−4 (EDT)
- Postal code(s): G0Z 1J0
- Area code: 819
- Highways A-55: R-161
- Website: www.municipalite stwenceslas.com

Saint-Wenceslas, Quebec (French pronunciation: [sɛ̃ wɛnsɛslas]) is a municipality in Nicolet-Yamaska Regional County Municipality, Quebec, Canada. The town is situated at a bend in the Bécancour River. The northern branch of Autoroute 55 terminated at the 9e rang of Saint-Wenceslas until its completion in October 2006. Route 161 also goes through the town.

The village church in Saint-Wenceslas was designed by Jean-Baptiste Louis Bourgeois, a local architect who also designed a Bahá'í House of Worship in the town of Wilmette, United States.

== Demographics ==
Census	Population	Change (%)
2021	1,167	▲0.9%
2016	1,157	▲8.7%
2011	1,064	▼3.4%
2006	1,101	▼2.7%
2001	1,132	▼3.2%
1996	1,170	▲44.4%
1991	810	▼5.7%
1986	859	▲1.4%
1981	847	▲9.1%
1976	776	▼2.8%
1971	798	▼4.5%
1966	836	▼6.7%
1961	896	▼4.0%
1956	933	▼2.5%
1951	957	▼5.0%
1941	1,007	▼2.7%
1931	1,035	▼31.7%
1921	1,515	▼12.2%
1911	1,725	▲6.1%
1901	1,626	▼14.8%
1891	1,909	▲47.2%
1881	1,297	▲77.9%
1871	729	N/A

== See also ==
- List of municipalities in Quebec
