= Nicolet, Quebec =

City in Quebec, Canada on Lac St Pierre

Nicolet
- City

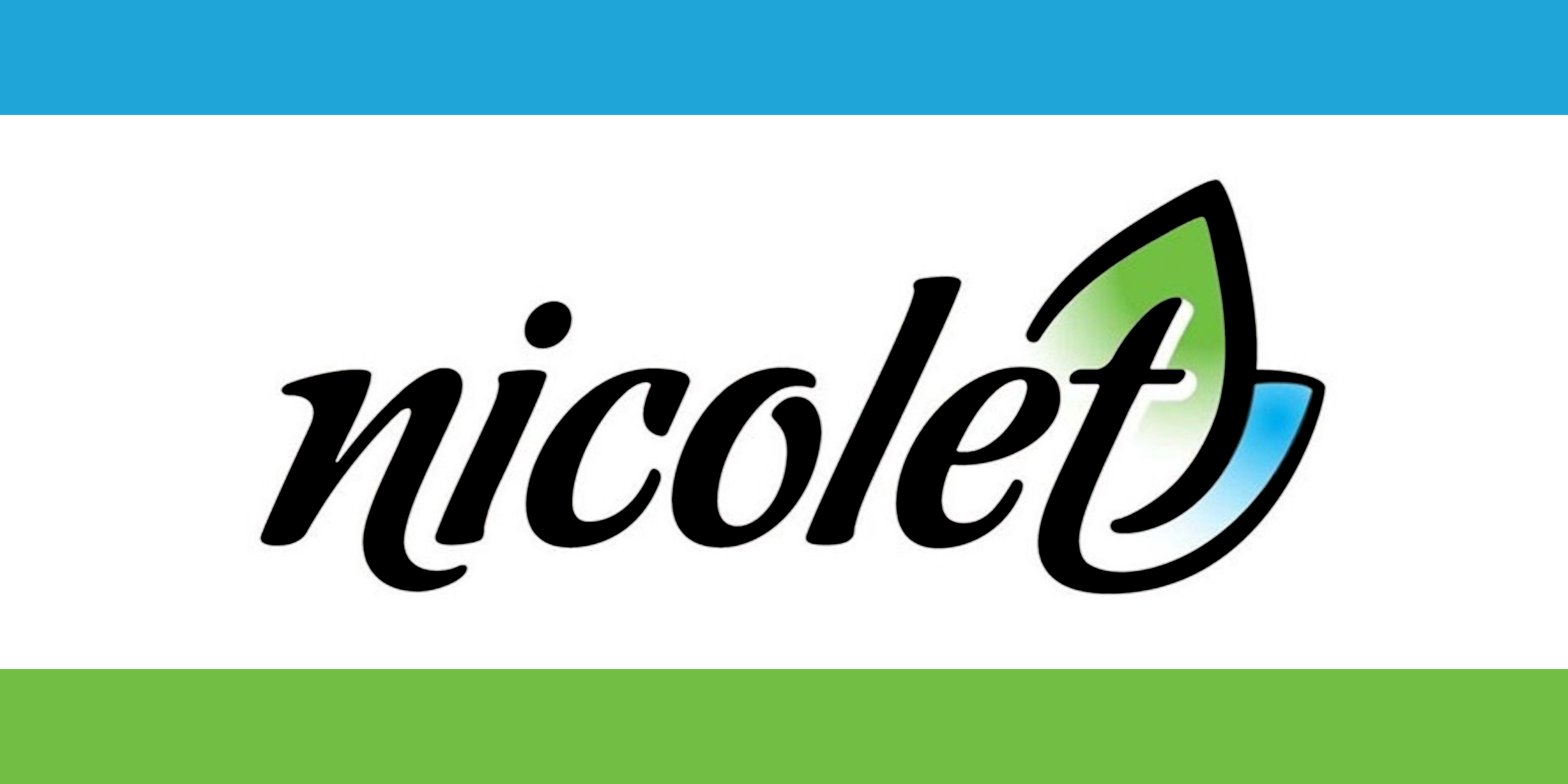
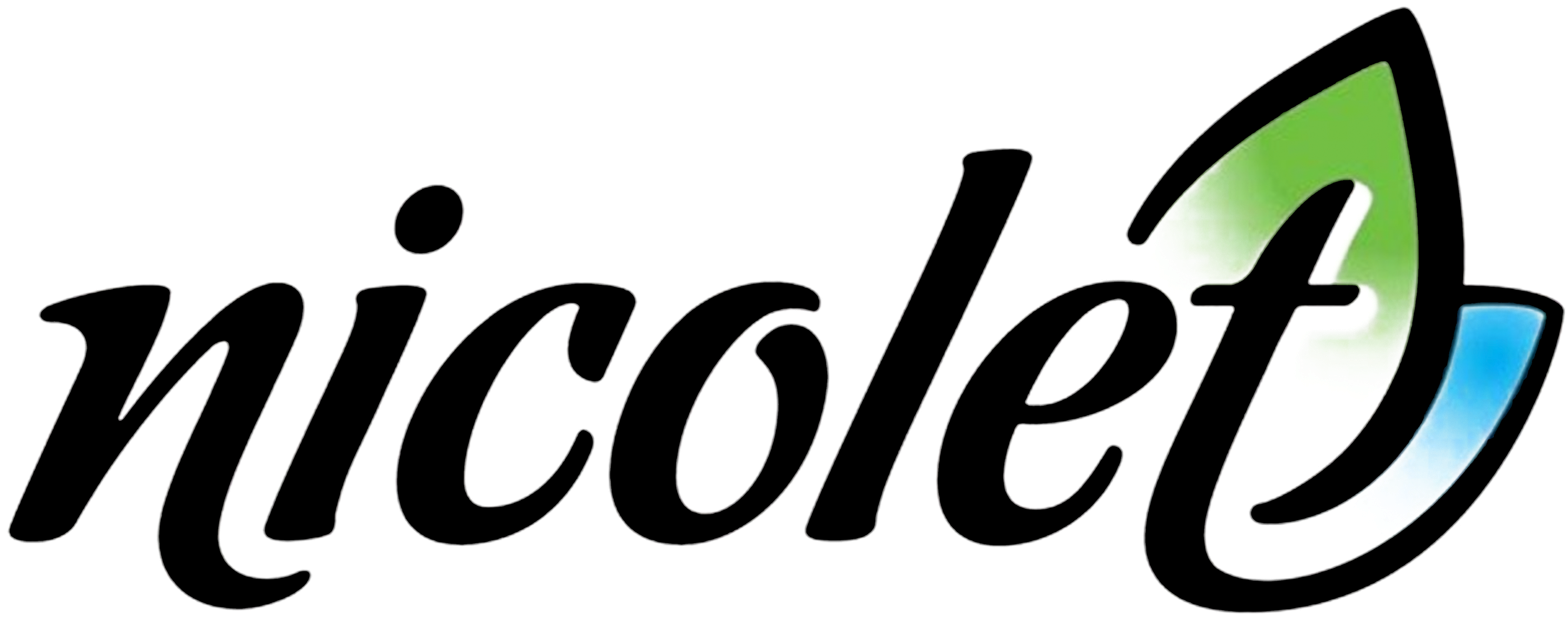
- Flag Seal

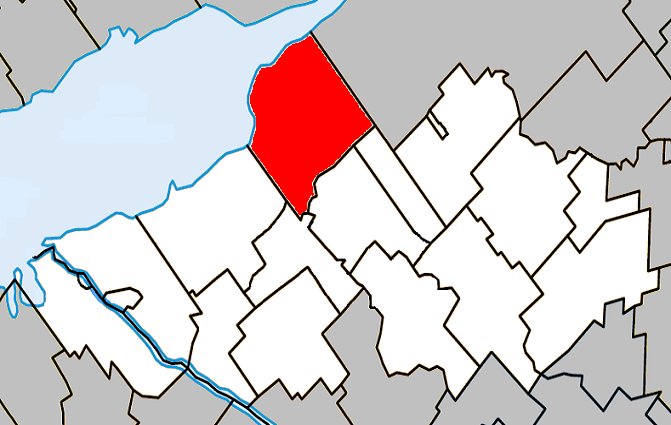
- Location within Nicolet-Yamaska RCM

- Location in southern Quebec
- Coordinates: 46°13′N 72°37′W
- Country: Canada
- Province: Quebec
- Region: Centre-du-Québec
- RCM: Nicolet-Yamaska
- Constituted: December 27, 2000

Government
  - Mayor: Geneviève Dubois
  - Federal riding: Bécancour—Nicolet—Saurel—Alnôbak
  - Prov. riding: Nicolet-Bécancour

Area
  - Total: 129.20 km^{2} (49.88 sq mi)
  - Land: 95.93 km^{2} (37.04 sq mi)

Population (2016)
  - Total: 8,169
  - Density: 85.2/km^{2} (221/sq mi)
  - Pop 2011-2016: ▲4.4%
  - Dwellings: 3,751
- Time zone: UTC−5 (EST)
  - Summer (DST): UTC−4 (EDT)
- Postal code(s): J3T
- Area code: 819
- Highways: R-132; R-259
- Website: www.ville.nicolet.qc.ca

Nicolet (French pronunciation: [nikɔlɛ(t)]) is the county seat of Nicolet-Yamaska Regional County Municipality, Quebec, Canada. The population as of the Canada 2016 Census was 8,169. It is the seat of the Roman Catholic Diocese of Nicolet. The town is listed as a Village rélais.

The residents of the town pronounce the final "t" in Nicolet, but people outside of the region do not.

== History ==
The town took its name from Jean Nicolet, a French explorer and clerk of the Company of One Hundred Associates, who explored the Great Lakes region west to Wisconsin. Despite never having lived there, he explored the area during the seven years he lived in Trois-Rivières. The area was originally settled by the Abenaki tribe, who knew it as Pithigan or Pithiganek, meaning “entrance”. French colonial settlement of Nicolet area began in the late 17th century, with Pierre Monet de Moras constructing a seigneurial manor on what is now known as Moras Island. Rights to the territory of Nicolet were accorded in 1672 by Jean Talon, passing through several hands in the next thirty years. Significant land development began at the opening of the 18th century, with the construction of the Saint-Jean-Baptiste Jesuit mission in 1701, a chapel in 1710, a presbytery in 1722, and a second church being raised in 1740.

The first Acadian settlers arrived in 1756, after their expulsion by the British, who had defeated the French in the Seven Years' War. During the late 18th century, the area eventually became a major centre for the Acadian diaspora. Some Acadian refugees continued south into the United States.

Development continued with the construction of a third church in 1784, the first elementary school in 1801, and the establishment of the Collège de Nicolet in 1803. The parish of Saint-Jean-Baptiste-de-Nicolet was officially opened in 1831; Nicolet's episcopal seat was established later in 1885.

A fourth church was constructed in 1873, suffering the collapse of its steeple shortly thereafter. Attempts to reconstruct it failed due to the weakness of the building's structure. Construction of the second cathedral began in 1897, but a part of the building collapsed in 1899. On June 21, 1906, a fire destroyed an area of the town, including both cathedrals and the headquarters of the Sisters of the Assumption. Reconstruction began soon afterwards, with the new headquarters of the Sisters of the Assumption and a girls' school being inaugurated in 1908. An agricultural school was added to the Collège in 1938, and a test centre for the Canadian Armed Forces was established in 1952.

On March 21, 1955, a fire gutted the downtown area of Nicolet, destroying 35 commercial buildings and displacing 75 families. A plaza in the area is named place du 21 mars (“21st of March Place”) to commemorate the event.

Eight months later, on November 12, 1955, a Leda clay landslide carried 7 acres (28,000 m^{2}) of earth and six buildings crashing down into the Nicolet river, killing three people, injuring six and causing $10 million in damages. The incident destroyed the trade school (established in 1887) and the recently rebuilt cathedral. The event was later the subject of a book by author Louis Caron entitled Le Bonhomme Sept-Heures. The riverfront road where the landslide occurred was named rue du 12 novembre (“12th of November Street”) in commemoration.

The present cathedral was rebuilt in 1963, and the Collège de Nicolet was converted into the École nationale de police du Québec in 1968.

== Geography ==
Nicolet is situated at the meeting of the Saint-Lawrence and Nicolet rivers, on sandy, unstable soil, making the area prone to landslides. **The main reason for the occurrence of the slide in Nicolet, Quebec is the type of soil in the area of which the slide occurred. Beneath the 8-foot thick stratified fine sand layer, was a thick stratified gray clay that extended to the depth of 35 feet and below that, was a darker clay with black mottling with a thickness of 100 feet. The clay is marine/Leda clay that is "extra sensitive" or "quick". The natural water content of the clay was above the liquid limit in some areas and above the plastic limit in others. Due to the salt concentration within marine clays, which would have crystallized as the marine water receded historically, the salt would be removed by rainfall and meltwater after winter. Glacio-marine clays and silts are common in this area due to the prior existence of the Champlain Sea, which used to occupy the St. Lawrence and Ottawa valleys post-glaciation.

It lies at the eastern edge of Lac Saint-Pierre, a UNESCO biosphere reserve known as a stopping point for hundreds of thousands of migrating waterfowl and a nesting area for herons.

The town of Nicolet is adjacent to the city of Bécancour, and across the Saint-Lawrence River from the city of Trois-Rivières.

== Demographics ==
In the 2021 Census of Population conducted by Statistics Canada, Nicolet had a population of 8,620 living in 3,752 of its 3,923 total private dwellings, a change of 5.5% from its 2016 population of 8,169. With a land area of 96.11 km^{2} (37.11 sq mi), it had a population density of 89.7/km^{2} (232.3/sq mi) in 2021.

Population trend:

Census	Population	Change (%)
2016	8,169	▲4.4%
2011	7,828	0.0%
2006	7,827	▼1.3%
2001	7,928	▲1.7%
Merger	7,795 (+)	▲44.2%
1996	4,352	▼9.1%
1991	4,789	N/A

(+) Amalgamation of the City of Nicolet, the Municipality of Nicolet-Sud and the Parish of Saint-Jean-Baptiste-de-Nicolet on December 27, 2000.

Mother tongue language (2006)

Language	Population	Pct (%)
French only	7,030	96.76%
English only	90	1.24%
Both English and French	20	0.28%
Other languages	125	1.72%

== Economy ==
=== Industry ===
Sogetel, a major independent telephone company, is headquartered here. The town is also mainly agriculture.

== Education ==
Curé-Brassard is a local elementary school. École Secondaire Jean-Nicolet is a public high school located on Monseigneur-Brunault street. Collège Notre-Dame-de-l'Assomption is a private high school located on Saint-Jean-Baptiste street.

Nicolet also has École nationale de police du Québec (Québec National Police Academy) and École d'agriculture de Nicolet. Trois-Rivières, a city approximately 20 km away from Nicolet, offers access to colleges and a university.

== Cultural ==
There is an ecological park, L'Anse du Port, featuring an observatory.

The Saint-Jean-Baptiste Cathedral contains artwork.

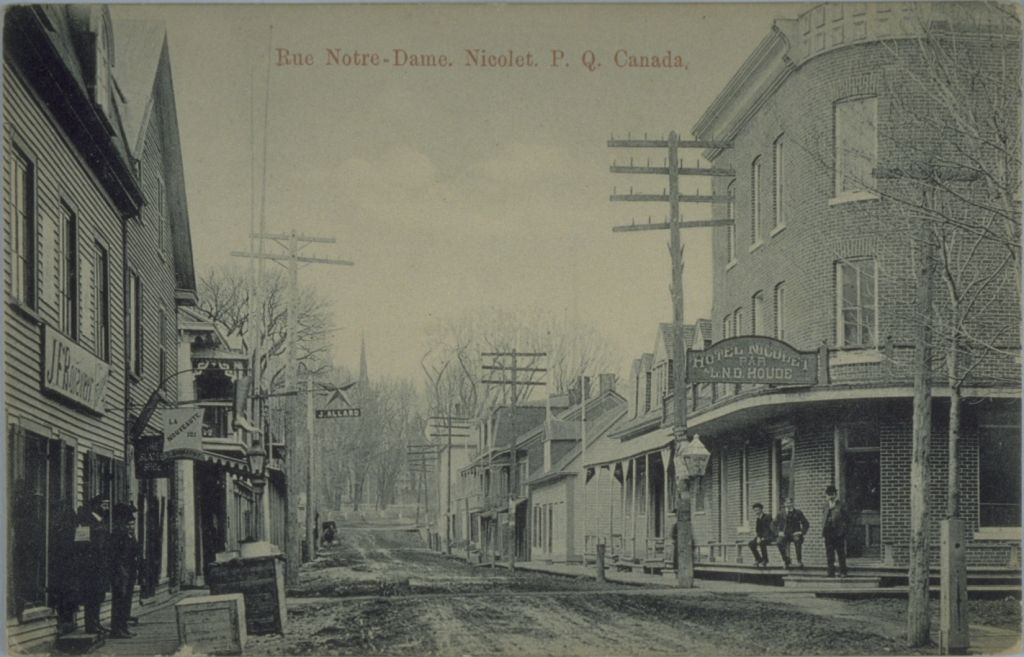
Rue Notre-Dame, Nicolet, Quebec, around 1910

The Musée des Religions du Monde focuses on the historical and ethnographic context of religion.

== Transportation ==
- Route 132
- Route 259

== See also ==
- List of cities in Quebec
- 21st-century municipal history of Quebec
