= Daveluyville =

- City
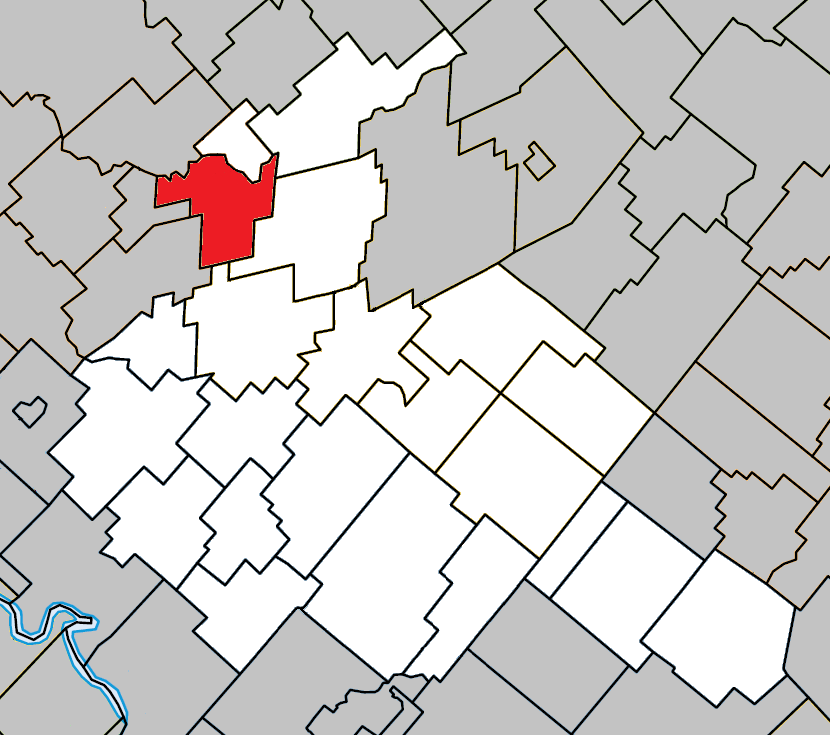
- Location within Arthabaska RCM.

- Location in southern Quebec.
- Coordinates: 46°12′N 72°08′W
- Country: Canada
- Province: Quebec
- Region: Centre-du-Québec
- RCM: Arthabaska
- Constituted: November 13, 1901

Government
  - Mayor: Mathieu Allard
  - Federal riding: Richmond—Arthabaska—des-Sources
  - Prov. riding: Nicolet-Bécancour

Area
  - Total: 62.70 km^{2} (24.21 sq mi)
  - Land: 61.71 km^{2} (23.83 sq mi)

Population (2021)
  - Total: 2,360
  - Density: 38.2/km^{2} (99/sq mi)
  - Pop 2016-2011: ▲4.7%
  - Dwellings: 1,154
- Time zone: UTC−5 (EST)
  - Summer (DST): UTC−4 (EDT)
- Postal code(s): G0Z 1C0
- Area code: 819
- Highways: R-261
- Website: www.ville.daveluyville.qc.ca

Daveluyville (/ˌdævəˈlaɪvɪl/; French pronunciation: [davəlɥivil]) is a city in the Centre-du-Québec region of the Canadian province of Quebec. It was founded by Adolphe Daveluy, the grandfather of organist Raymond Daveluy and soprano Marie Daveluy. It is north of Autoroute 20. Its population was 2,360 in the Canada 2021 Census.

== Demographics ==
In the 2021 Census of Population conducted by Statistics Canada, Daveluyville had a population of 2,360 living in 1,077 of its 1,154 total private dwellings, a change of 4.7% from its 2016 population of 2,255. With a land area of 61.71 km^{2} (23.83 sq mi), it had a population density of 38.2/km^{2} (99.0/sq mi) in 2021.
