= Ulverton River =

River in Estrie, Quebec, Canada

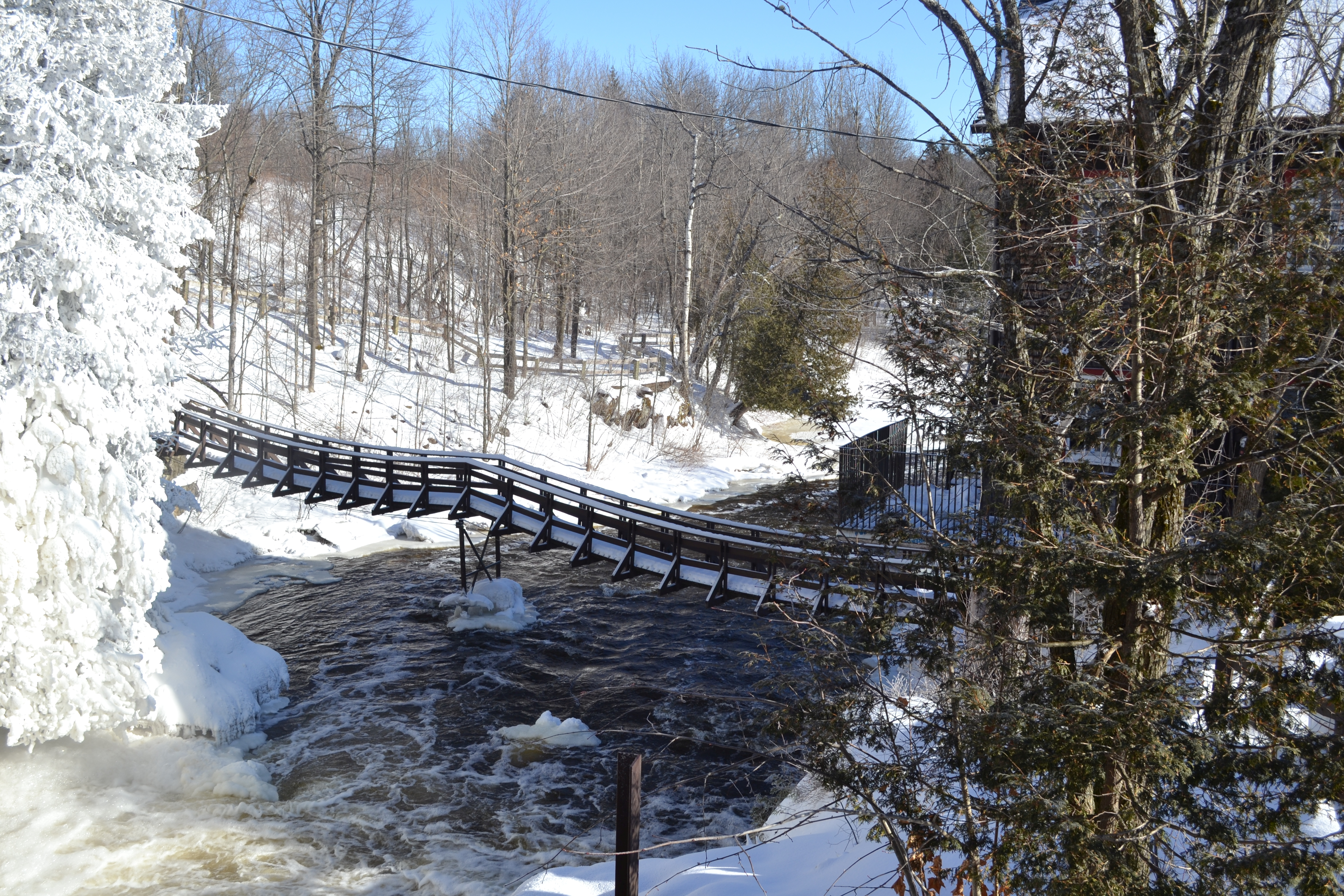

Location
- Country: Canada
- Province: Quebec
- Region: Estrie
- Regional County Municipality: Le Val-Saint-François Regional County Municipality

Physical characteristics
- Source: Various streams
  - location: Maricourt
  - coordinates: 45°41′59″N 73°19′12″W
  - elevation: 286 m (938 ft)
- Mouth: Saint-François River
  - location: Ulverton
  - coordinates: 45.73639°N 72.23639°W
  - elevation: 115 m (377 ft)
- Length: 40.3 km (25.0 mi)

Basin features
- Tributaries
  - left: (Upstream)
  - right: (Upstream)

The Ulverton River is a tributary of the Saint-François River, flowing on the South Shore of the Saint-Laurent river, in the administrative region of Estrie, in Quebec, Canada.

The course of the Ulverton river crosses the territories of:

- the regional county municipality (MRC) of Le Val-Saint-François (administrative region of Estrie): Maricourt, Racine and Melbourne;
- the MRC of Drummond Regional County Municipality (administrative region of Centre-du-Québec): municipalities of Durham-Sud and Ulverton.

== Geography ==
The main neighboring hydrographic slopes of the Ulverton River are:

- north side: Saint-Germain River;
- east side: Saint-François River;
- south side: rivière au Saumon, Brandy stream, Fraser River;
- west side: rivière le Renne, Saint-Germain River, Yamaska River.

The Ulverton River flows approximately 30 kilometres (19 mi) northeast to its mouth. It constitutes the main hydrographic slope of the municipality of Ulverton.

The Ulverton river has its source in a mountain area in the municipality of Maricourt, in the northern part of the canton of Ely, at 1.5 kilometres (0.93 mi) from the northern limit west of the municipality of Racine. The head of the river is located east of the head of the rivière le Renne, south of the Rivard stream, southwest of the village of Maricourt, east of route 222 and north of Valcourt.

Upper course of the river (segment of 20.8 kilometres (12.9 mi))

The Ulverton river first flows over:

- 5.1 kilometres (3.2 mi) east, making a large loop north, then another south, crossing Racine on 1.0 kilometre (0.62 mi), to rang first road (north–south direction);
- 1.8 kilometres (1.1 mi) northerly, crossing the dividing line between Racine and Melbourne, south-east of the village of Maricourt, to Chemin d'Ely;
- 5.4 kilometres (3.4 mi) towards the north, collecting the Bisaillon stream (coming from the southwest), up to the country road;
- 3.6 kilometres (2.2 mi) north, collecting the Nelson stream, to a country road;
- 4.9 kilometres (3.0 mi) north-east, then north-west, crossing the "Melbourne Valley", to route 116 and the road iron, which the current crosses at 4.6 kilometres (2.9 mi) west of the New Bridge at Richmond.

Lower course of the river (segment of 19.5 kilometres (12.1 mi))

From route 116, the Ulverton river flows over:

- 5.1 kilometres (3.2 mi) west, winding the north side of route 116 and the railroad, and back into Durham-Sud, to a stream (coming from the west);
- 7.6 kilometres (4.7 mi) north, to highway 55;
- 5.1 kilometres (3.2 mi) northeasterly, to route 143;
- 1.7 kilometres (1.1 mi) north, to its mouth.

The Ulverton River empties into a river bend on the west bank of the Saint-François River, 6.3 kilometres (3.9 mi) upstream from Brown Island and 4.4 kilometres (2.7 mi) downstream from Stevens Island. This mouth is located 1.3 kilometres (0.81 mi) north of the village center of Ulverton and 5.5 kilometres (3.4 mi) south-east of the village center of L'Avenir.

== Toponymy ==
Formerly, this watercourse was also known as the “Black River”.

The toponym “Rivière Ulverton” was officially registered on December 5, 1968, at the Commission de toponymie du Québec.

== See also ==
- List of rivers of Quebec
