= Rivière au Saumon (Le Val-Saint-François) =

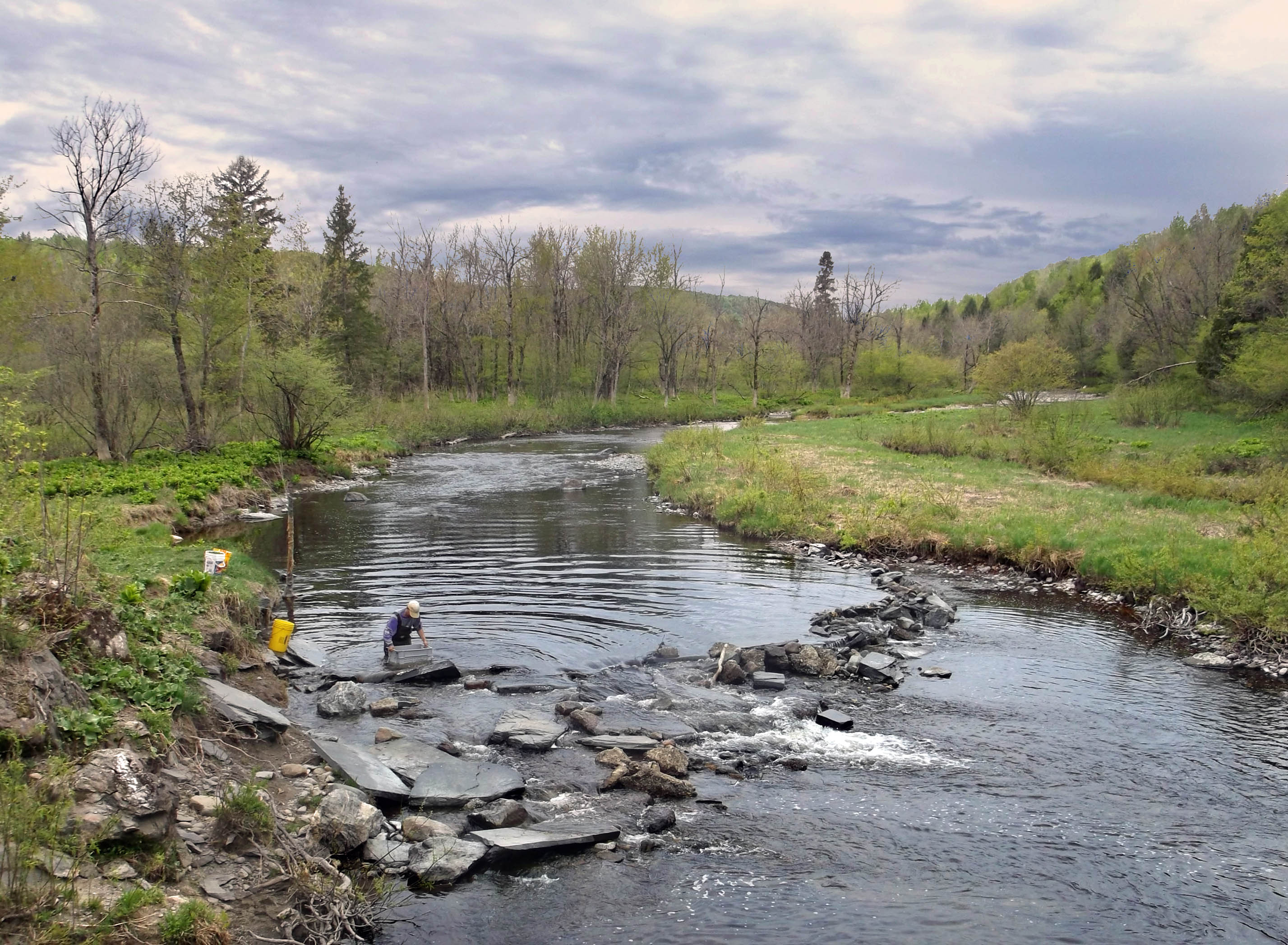

Location
- Country: Canada
- Province: Quebec
- Region: Estrie
- MRC: Le Haut-Saint-François Regional County Municipality
- Municipality: Weedon

Physical characteristics
- Source: Brompton Lake
  - location: Saint-Denis-de-Brompton
  - coordinates: 45°28′14″N 72°07′57″W
  - elevation: 239 m (784 ft)
- Mouth: Saint-François River
  - location: Melbourne
  - coordinates: 45°28′14″N 72°07′00″W
  - elevation: 119 metres (390 ft)
- Length: 23.0 km (14.3 mi)

Basin features
- Progression: Saint-François River, Saint Lawrence River
- Tributaries
  - left: (upstream) Horre stream, Gulf stream
  - right: (upstream) ruisseau des Vases

The rivière au Saumon (English: Salmon River) is a tributary of the Saint-François River, on the South Shore of the Saint Lawrence River, in the province of Quebec, Canada. The river has a basin of 291 km^{2} (112 sq mi) and has its source in lake Brompton.

The course of the Rivière au Saumon crosses the territories of the Le Val-Saint-François Regional County Municipality (administrative region of Estrie): Saint-Denis-de-Brompton, Racine, Kingsbury and Melbourne.

Besides the village areas, forestry is the main economic activity in this valley; agriculture, second especially in the lower part.

The surface of the Salmon River is usually frozen from mid-December to mid-March, except the rapids areas; however, safe circulation on the ice is generally from late December to early March.

== Geography ==
The main hydrographic slopes neighboring the Salmon River are:

- north side: Ulverton River, Saint-François River;
- east side: Saint-François River;
- south side: Magog River;
- west side: Gulf brook, Brandy brook, Noire River (Yamaska River), Renne River.

The Rivière au Saumon constitutes the outfall of lake Brompton, the mouth of which is located northeast of the lake, north of the hamlet "Lac-Brompton", in the territory of the municipality of Saint-Denis-de-Brompton.

From the route 222 bridge located at the mouth of Lac Brompton, the Salmon River flows to the bottom of a valley on:

- 0.3 km (0.19 mi) north, in the municipality of Saint-Denis-de-Brompton, up to the limit of this municipality;
- 5.7 km (3.5 mi) towards the north, marking on this whole segment of river, the limit between Saint-François-Xavier-de-Brompton and Racine, up to the limit of Kingsbury;
- 5.0 km (3.1 mi) northerly, in the municipality of Melbourne, collecting the waters of Gulf brook;
- 5.8 km (3.6 mi) to the north, in the municipality of Kingsbury, collecting the ruisse des Vases;
- 6.2 km (3.9 mi) north, in the municipality of Melbourne, collecting the water from Horre stream, to its mouth.

The Rivière au Saumon flows on the west bank of the Saint-François River at 0.9 km (0.56 mi) downstream from Morin Island, at 10.2 km (6.3 mi) downstream Pont des Papetiers (connecting the hamlet of "Greenlay" and the town of Windsor) and 3.8 km (2.4 mi) upstream of the Mackenzie Bridge (connecting Melbourne and Richmond).

== Toponymy ==
Formerly, this river was designated by its English name: "Salmon Brook River". The Abenaki use the name "Madakik", meaning "bad land".

The toponym "Rivière au Saumon" was officially registered on December 5, 1968, at the Commission de toponymie du Québec.
