= Fraser River (Le Val-Saint-François) =

River in Estrie, Quebec, Canada

Location
- Country: Canada
- Province: Quebec
- Region: Estrie
- Regional County Municipality: Le Val-Saint-François Regional County Municipality

Physical characteristics
- Source: Various streams
  - location: Melbourne
  - coordinates: 45°32′40″N 72°13′34″W
  - elevation: 275 m (902 ft)
- Mouth: Saint-François River
  - location: Melbourne
  - coordinates: 45.5825°N 72.25139°W
  - elevation: 176 m (577 ft)
- Length: 4.7 km (2.9 mi)

Basin features
- Tributaries
  - left: (Upstream)
  - right: (Upstream)

The Fraser River is a tributary of the Ulverton River, which drains on the east bank of the Saint-François River. The entire Fraser River flows in the municipality of Melbourne, in the Le Val-Saint-François Regional County Municipality (MRC), in the administrative region of Estrie, on the South Shore of the Saint Lawrence River, in Quebec, Canada.

== Geography ==
The main neighboring hydrographic slopes of the Fraser River are:

- north side: Ulverton River;
- east side: Miller stream, Saint-François River;
- south side: Brandy Creek, Ulverton River;
- west side: rivière le Renne, Ulverton River Noire River (Yamaska River tributary).

The Fraser River originates in the mountains of the "Melbourne Ridge" located south of the hamlet "Melboro", northeast of the village of Racine and east of the village of Maricourt.

The Fraser River flows north-east, in a forest zone in its upper part. It drains on the east bank of the Ulverton River, 2.4 kilometres (1.5 mi) northeast of the village of Maricourt.

== Toponymy ==
According to the "Bank of place names" of the Commission de toponymie du Québec of the province of Quebec has 135 toponyms (mostly streets, roads/paths, lakes, streams) including the patronymic "Fraser".

The toponym "Fraser River" was officially registered on November 7, 1985, at the Commission de toponymie du Québec.

== See also ==
- List of rivers of Quebec
