= Saint-Germain River =

River in Centre-du-Québec, Quebec, Canada

Location
- Country: Canada
- Province: Quebec
- Region: Centre-du-Québec
- Regional County Municipality: Drummond Regional County Municipality

Physical characteristics
- Source: Various agricultural streams
  - location: Drummondville
  - coordinates: 45°41′59″N 72°20′08″W
  - elevation: 199 m (653 ft)
- Mouth: Saint-François River
  - location: Drummondville
  - coordinates: 45.90222°N 72.49889°W
  - elevation: 69 m (226 ft)
- Length: 50.0 km (31.1 mi)

Basin features
- Tributaries
  - left: (Upstream) cours d'eau Guilbault, ruisseau Marrier, cours d'eau Ayotte, cours d'eau Thivierge, ruisseau Paré, ruisseau Pinard, ruisseau Berry, cours d'eau Turner, cours d'eau Desrosiers, ruisseau Lefebvre, cours d'eau Lobsiger.
  - right: (Upstream) ruisseau Marconi, ruisseau Sarrazin, ruisseau Kelly, ruisseau Méderic-Brochu, ruisseau Girard, cours d'eau Ménard.

The Saint-Germain River is a tributary of the Saint-François River. It flows in Drummond Regional County Municipality (MRC), north-west in the administrative region of Centre-du-Québec, on the South Shore of the Saint Lawrence River, in Quebec, Canada. This river crosses the municipalities of: l'Avenir, Durham-Sud, Lefebvre, Wickham, Saint-Germain-de-Grantham and Drummondville.

== Geography ==
The main neighboring hydrographic slopes of the Saint-Germain river are:

- north side: Saint-François River;
- east side: Saint-François River;
- south side: Ulverton River;
- west side: David River, rivière le Renne, Yamaska River.

The Saint-Germain river draws its water from the heads of various streams flowing in agricultural zones and crossing some forest islets, in the municipality of L'Avenir. The head of the river is located 1.2 kilometres (0.75 mi) southwest of highway 55.

Upper course of the river (segment of 23.2 kilometres (14.4 mi))

The Saint-Germain river flows in an agricultural zone on:

- 2.5 kilometres (1.6 mi) towards the south in the zone up to the municipality limit of the municipality of Durham-Sud (i.e. the extension of the Rang 8e road);
- 1.3 kilometres (0.81 mi) west to Mcgineney Road;
- 1.8 kilometres (1.1 mi) northwesterly, to Route Ployart which constitutes the southeastern limit of Lefebvre;
- 3.6 kilometres (2.2 mi) north-west, crossing the municipality of Lefebvre, collecting the Charpentier stream, up to the O'Brien road, that it crosses 2.1 kilometres (1.3 mi) west of the hamlet "Sainte-Jeanne-d'Arc";
- 7.1 kilometres (4.4 mi) west, to Caya road;
- 6.9 kilometres (4.3 mi) northwesterly, along more or less a segment of the ninth rang road, in the municipality of Wickham, and by collecting the Ménard stream, up to route 139.

Lower course of the Saint-Germain river (segment of 26.8 kilometres (16.7 mi))

From route 139, the Saint-Germain river flows over:

- 8.5 kilometres (5.3 mi) (or 5.5 kilometres (3.4 mi) in a direct line) north-west, winding in segments, up to the ninth rang road;
- 3.9 kilometres (2.4 mi) (including 2.4 kilometres (1.5 mi) north-west and 1.5 kilometres (0.93 mi) north-east), up to chemin du seventh rank;
- 4.1 kilometres (2.5 mi) northeasterly, up to highway 55;
- 3.9 kilometres (2.4 mi) northeasterly, up to the city limit of Drummondville;
- 3.5 kilometres (2.2 mi) while crossing the city of Drummondville where it separates on 0.8 kilometres (0.50 mi) the industrial and residential sector, up to route 143;
- 2.9 kilometres (1.8 mi) towards the northeast, crossing the exhibition ground, to its mouth.

The Saint-Germain river empties on the west bank of the Saint-François River at 0.8 kilometres (0.50 mi) upstream of the "pont des Voltigeurs" (highway 20) and 1.5 kilometres (0.93 mi) downstream from the "Traverse Bridge" (route 122). Its mouth is located in the area of the golf course.

== Toponymy ==
The old toponyms of the river are: "Rivière Noire" and "Rivière Prévost". The variants of indigenous origin (used by the Abenaki) designating this river are: "Naskategwantekw" or Naskategwantegw, meaning "the serpentine river".

The toponym "Rivière Saint-Germain" was officially registered on December 5, 1968, at the Commission de toponymie du Québec.

== See also ==
- List of rivers of Quebec
