= Saint-Denis, Quebec =

Saint-Denis may refer to several places in Quebec:

- Saint-Denis (electoral district), a former federal riding in Ahuntsic, Montreal
- Saint-Denis-De La Bouteillerie, Quebec, a municipality in Kamouraska Regional County Municipality
- Saint-Denis-sur-Richelieu, Quebec, a municipality in La Vallée-du-Richelieu Regional County Municipality formed by the 1997 amalgamation of a parish municipality and a village, both called "Saint-Denis"
- Saint-Denis-de-Brompton, Quebec, a municipality in Le Val-Saint-François Regional County Municipality
