= Quebec Autoroute 55 =

Highway in Quebec

Autoroute 55
- Autoroute Joseph-Armand Bombardier; Autoroute de l'Énergie

Route information
- Maintained by Transports Québec
- Length: 246.5 km (153.2 mi)
- Existed: 1964–present
- History: A-51

Major junctions
- South end: I-91 at the U.S. border in Stanstead
- A-10 in Magog; A-410 in Sherbrooke; A-10 / A-610 in Sherbrooke; A-20 (TCH) in Drummondville; A-20 (TCH) / A-955 in Sainte-Eulalie; A-30 / R-132 in Bécancour; R-138 in Trois-Rivières; A-40 in Trois-Rivières
- North end: R-155 in Shawinigan

Location
- Country: Canada
- Province: Quebec
- Major cities: Magog, Sherbrooke, Drummondville, Trois-Rivières, Shawinigan

Highway system
- Quebec provincial highways; Autoroutes; List; Former
← A-50	→ A-70

Autoroute 55 (also called Autoroute de l'Énergie north of the Autoroute 20 and Autoroute Joseph-Armand Bombardier south of it, formerly Autoroute Transquébécoise) is an important north–south Autoroute and the only one running in that direction in central Quebec. It is the longest north-south Autoroute, beginning as the continuation of I-91 at the Canada–United States border near Stanstead and continuing to Shawinigan, where it downgrades to Route 155. The total length of A-55 is currently 247 kilometres (153 mi), including concurrencies with Autoroute 10, Autoroute 20 and Autoroute 40.

== Route description ==
Autoroute 55 connects the mid-sized communities of Magog, Sherbrooke, Drummondville, Trois-Rivières, and Shawinigan and the smaller communities in between. The most notable feature on A-55 is the Laviolette Bridge between Trois-Rivières and Bécancour, which is one of the longest bridges in Quebec and in Canada.

A-55 had a short "gap" between Bécancour and Drummondville until October 2006. The gap resulted from Transports Quebec's original intention of bringing A-55 southeast towards Victoriaville along what is now Autoroute 955 before shifting southwest to rejoin existing A-55 near Richmond. However, plans changed in the 1970s, and the present routing was chosen. The southern section was originally supposed to be Autoroute 51 and was intended to continue to the planned extension of Autoroute 30 in Pierreville. A-55 was signed along Route 155 (which is not an Autoroute-standard highway) until the new route was completed.

All of the southern portion of A-55 became a full four-lane freeway by the end of October 2006. The gap being filled in the northern portion will initially be a two-lane freeway for about 20 kilometres (12 mi), but it is intended to ultimately be four lanes.

The designation Autoroute Joseph-Armand Bombardier is in honour of Quebec businessman Joseph-Armand Bombardier, who lived in Valcourt, near where A-55 passes and who invented the snowmobile there. His company, Bombardier Inc., started by building snowmobiles and eventually grew into a major international manufacturer of transit vehicles and aircraft.

The designation Autoroute de l'Énergie means "Energy Highway" since it provides access to the Gentilly Nuclear Generating Station in Bécancour and the hydroelectric facilities in Shawinigan and the Haut-Saint-Maurice area, but the section north of A-30 is likely to remain at its comparatively short length to Shawinigan for the foreseeable future.

== Exit list ==
RCM	Location	km	mi	Old exit	New exit	Destinations	Notes
Memphrémagog	Stanstead	0.00	0.00		—	I-91 south – Derby Line, Newport	Continuation into Vermont; A-55 / Autoroute Joseph-Armand Bombardier southern terminus
Memphrémagog	Stanstead	0.00	0.00	Canada–United States border at Derby Line–Rock Island Border Crossing			
Memphrémagog	Stanstead	0.3	0.19			R-247 west (Boulevard Notre-Dame)	At-grade intersection, traffic signals
Memphrémagog	Stanstead	2.0	1.2		2	R-143 (Rue Dufferin) – Stanstead	
Memphrémagog	Stanstead-Est	5.7	3.5	Curtis Rest Stop (Northbound)			
Memphrémagog	Sainte-Catherine-de-Hatley	20.7	12.9		21	R-141 – Ayer's Cliff, Coaticook	
Memphrémagog	Sainte-Catherine-de-Hatley	28.7	17.8		29	R-108 – Sainte-Catherine-de-Hatley, North Hatley, Sherbrooke	
Memphrémagog	Magog	31.8	19.8		32	Rue-Saint-Patrice, Boulevard Industriel	
Memphrémagog	Magog	33.1	20.6		33	R-112 – Magog (Centre-Ville)	
Memphrémagog	Magog	34.4	21.4	34 71	34 121	A-10 west – Montréal	South end of A-10 concurrency; northbound signed as exits 34-E (east) and 34-O (west); southbound signed as exit 121; exit numbers follow A-10
Memphrémagog–Sherbrooke boundary	Magog–Sherbrooke boundary	36.7– 37.8	22.8– 23.5	72 36	123	R-112 (Rue Sherbrook) to R-249 – Magog (Centre-Ville), Saint-Denis-de-Brompton	R-112 follows A-10 / A-55 service roads
Sherbrooke		41.0	25.5	41	128	R-112 (Boulevard Bourque)	R-112 exits A-10 / A-55 service roads
Sherbrooke		46.9	29.1	46	133	Chemin Saint-Roch Nord	
Sherbrooke		49.6	30.8	Catherine-Day Truck Stop (Northbound)			
Sherbrooke		50.9	31.6	50	137	R-220 (Boulevard Industriel), Chemin de Saint-Élie	
Sherbrooke		54.4	33.8	54	140	A-410 east to R-108 (Rue King) – Cookshire-Eaton	
Sherbrooke		55.2	34.3	55	141	Boulevard de Monseigneur-Fortier	
Sherbrooke		56.9	35.4		143	A-10 ends / A-610 east (Autoroute Louis-Bilodeau) to R-112 – Sherbrooke Centre-Ville, East Angus, Lac-Mégantic	A-10 eastern terminus; north end of A-10 concurrency
Sherbrooke		58.0	36.0		58	R-222 (Chemin des Écossais) – Saint-Denis-de-Brompton, Valcourt	A-55 exit numbers resume
Sherbrooke		60.1	37.3		60	Rue Laval	
Le Val-Saint-François	Windsor	71.0	44.1		71	R-249 – Windsor, Saint-François-Xavier-de-Brompton	Signed as exits 71N (north) and 71S (south) northbound
Le Val-Saint-François	Melbourne	84.5	52.5		85	R-243 – Racine, Valcourt, Melbourne	Melbourne Service Centre
Le Val-Saint-François	Melbourne	88.7	55.1		88	R-116 – Acton Vale, Richmond, Val-des-Sources	
Le Val-Saint-François	Ulverton	97.7	60.7		98	Chemin Mooney	Northbound exit and entrance
Drummond	L'Avenir	104.1	64.7		103	Lefebvre, L'Avenir, Ulverton, Durham-Sud	
Drummond	Drummondville	111.3	69.2		111	Route Caya	
Drummond	Drummondville	116.4	72.3		116	R-139 – Wickham, Acton Vale, Granby, Drummondville	
Drummond	Drummondville	122.0	75.8		122	Boulevard Jean-de-Brébeuf – Drummondville	
Drummond	Drummondville	125.4	77.9		125	R-122 – Saint-Germain-de-Grantham, Drummondville	
Drummond	Drummondville	128.0	79.5		128 173	A-20 (TCH) west – Montréal	South end of A-20 concurrency; exit numbers follow A-20; north end of Autoroute Joseph-Armand Bombardier
Drummond	Drummondville	125.4	77.9		175	R-143 north (Boulevard Lemire) – Saint-Bonaventure, Saint-François-du-Lac	South end of R-143 concurrency
Drummond	Drummondville	131.3	81.6		177	R-143 south – Saint-Majorique-de-Grantham, Drummondville	North end of R-143 concurrency
Drummond	Drummondville	133.6	83.0		179	Chemin du Golf	
Drummond	Drummondville	135.1	83.9		181	Drummondville	
Drummond	Saint-Cyrille-de-Wendover	139.9	86.9		185	R-255 – Baie-du-Febvre, Saint-Cyrille-de-Wendover, Saint-Félix-de-Kingsey	
Drummond	Notre-Dame-du-Bon-Conseil	145.9	90.7		191	Sainte-Brigitte-des-Saults	
Drummond	Notre-Dame-du-Bon-Conseil	150.8	93.7		196	R-259 – Nicolet, Sainte-Perpétue, Notre-Dame-du-Bon-Conseil	
Drummond – Nicolet-Yamaska boundary	Notre-Dame-du-Bon-Conseil – Saint-Léonard-d'Aston boundary	154.1	95.8		200	Saint-Léonard-d'Aston	Former R-155 north
Nicolet-Yamaska	Saint-Léonard-d'Aston	156.1	97.0		202	Rang du Moulin-Rouge	
Nicolet-Yamaska	Sainte-Eulalie	157.3	97.7		204	Rang des Cédres, Rang des Plaines	
Nicolet-Yamaska	Sainte-Eulalie	163.4	101.5		210 145	A-955 south – Saint-Samuel, Saint-Albert, Victoriaville, Warwick A-20 (TCH) east to R-161 – Québec, Sainte-Eulalie, Saint-Valère	North end of A-20 concurrency; A-955 exit 15; A-55 exit numbers resume; south end of Autoroute de l'Énergie
Nicolet-Yamaska	Saint-Wenceslas	171.8	106.8		153	Saint-Léonard-d'Aston, Saint-Wenceslas	
Nicolet-Yamaska	Saint-Célestin	183.2	113.8		—	R-226 – Saint-Célestin	At-grade intersection, traffic signals; interchange proposed; former R-155 south / R-161 south
Bécancour	Bécancour	186.3	115.8		—	Rang Prince	At-grade intersection; to be removed as part of the A-55 widening project
Bécancour	Bécancour	188.1	116.9		—	Chemin Forest – Précieux-Sang	At-grade intersection; to be removed as part of the A-55 widening project
Bécancour	Bécancour	189.8	117.9		—	Chemin Thibodeau	At-grade intersection; to be removed as part of the A-55 widening project
Bécancour	Bécancour	191.9	119.2		173	Bécancour, Nicolet, Wôlinak	
Bécancour	Bécancour	194.3– 195.4	120.7– 121.4		176	A-30 / R-132 – Bécancour, Sainte-Angèle	A-30 exit 209
St. Lawrence River		196.2– 198.8	121.9– 123.5	Pont Laviolette (Laviolette Bridge)			
Trois-Rivières		198.8	123.5		181	R-138 (Rue Notre-Dame, Boulevard Gene-H.-Kruger)	
Trois-Rivières		200.6	124.6		182	A-40 east – Trois-Rivières (Centre-Ville), Québec	South end of A-40 concurrency; A-40 exit 197
Trois-Rivières		201.2	125.0		183	Boulevard Jean-XXIII	
Trois-Rivières		204.1– 204.6	126.8– 127.1		186	A-40 west / Boulevard des Forges – Montreal	North end of A-40 concurrency; A-40 exit 196
Trois-Rivières		209.3	130.1		191	Boulevard Industriel, Boulevard Saint-Michel	
Trois-Rivières		214.6	133.3		196	Boulevard des Forges – Yamachiche	
Maskinongé	Saint-Étienne-des-Grès	219.9	136.6		202	Saint-Étienne-des-Grès, Saint-Barnabé	
Maskinongé	Saint-Étienne-des-Grès	222.9	138.5	Grès Rest Stop (Northbound, seasonal)			
Maskinongé	Saint-Étienne-des-Grès	224.4	139.4		206	Saint-Boniface	
Maskinongé	Saint-Boniface	229.8	142.8		211	R-153 – Saint-Boniface, Shawinigan	
Shawinigan		234.4	145.6		216	Rue Burrill	
Shawinigan		235.8	146.5		217	R-351 (Rue Garnier) – Saint-Mathieu-du-Parc	
Shawinigan		238.1	147.9		220	Boulevard Hubert-Biermans, Boulevard Vallée-du-Parc	
Shawinigan		241.4	150.0		223	Avenue de Grande-Mère, 25^{e} rue	
Shawinigan		244.5	151.9		226	Chemin du Parc National, 8^{e} rue	
Shawinigan		246.5	153.2	Pont des Piles (Piles Bridge) crosses Saint-Maurice River			
Shawinigan		246.5	153.2		—	R-155 north – Grandes-Piles, La Tuque	A-55 / Autoroute de l'Énergie northern terminus; continues as R-155
1.000 mi = 1.609 km; 1.000 km = 0.621 mi: Concurrency terminus; Incomplete access; Route transition; Unopened

== Rest Areas ==
There are three rest areas found on A-55 and none are full service centre as most are near populated areas that can provide services for travellers.

Location	Name	km	Direction	Services
St-Etienne-Des-Gres	Autoroute de l'Énergie Rest Area		Northbound	Parking for trucks and cars (maximum 4 hours stop time), tourist information booth and rest rooms. Located across from Saint-Boniface-de-Shawinigan Weight Station
Ulverton	Halte du Moulin		Southbound	Parking area only (maximum 4 hours stop time) located near Moulin A Laine D'Ulverton. No services available - rest room and tourist information building demolished before 2015. Near stop for food and restrooms is McDonald's two exits down in Melbourne.
Stanstead, Quebec	Halte Curtis		Northbound	Parking for cars, RVs and trucks only (maximum 4 hours stop time). Rest rooms are closed and portable toilets removed from site. Motorists have more options available (food, rest rooms and fuel) by travelleing either north (about 27 km) to Magog or back south (about 4 km) in Stanstead.

== Future ==
On April 2, 2024, Drummondville news outlet Vingt55 reported that Transport Minister Geneviève Guilbault alongside Minister Responsible for the Centre-du-Québec Region André Lamontagne announced in Drummondville that the Government of Quebec has made a two-year investment of CAD$274,442,000 in the roadways of the Centre-du-Québec region, and that part of the money would be going towards converting A-55 between Sainte-Eulalie and Bécancour from a super two to a standard four-lane freeway. Announcements regarding rest areas being renovated or revamped along the highway are expected to come at a later date.

== Gallery ==
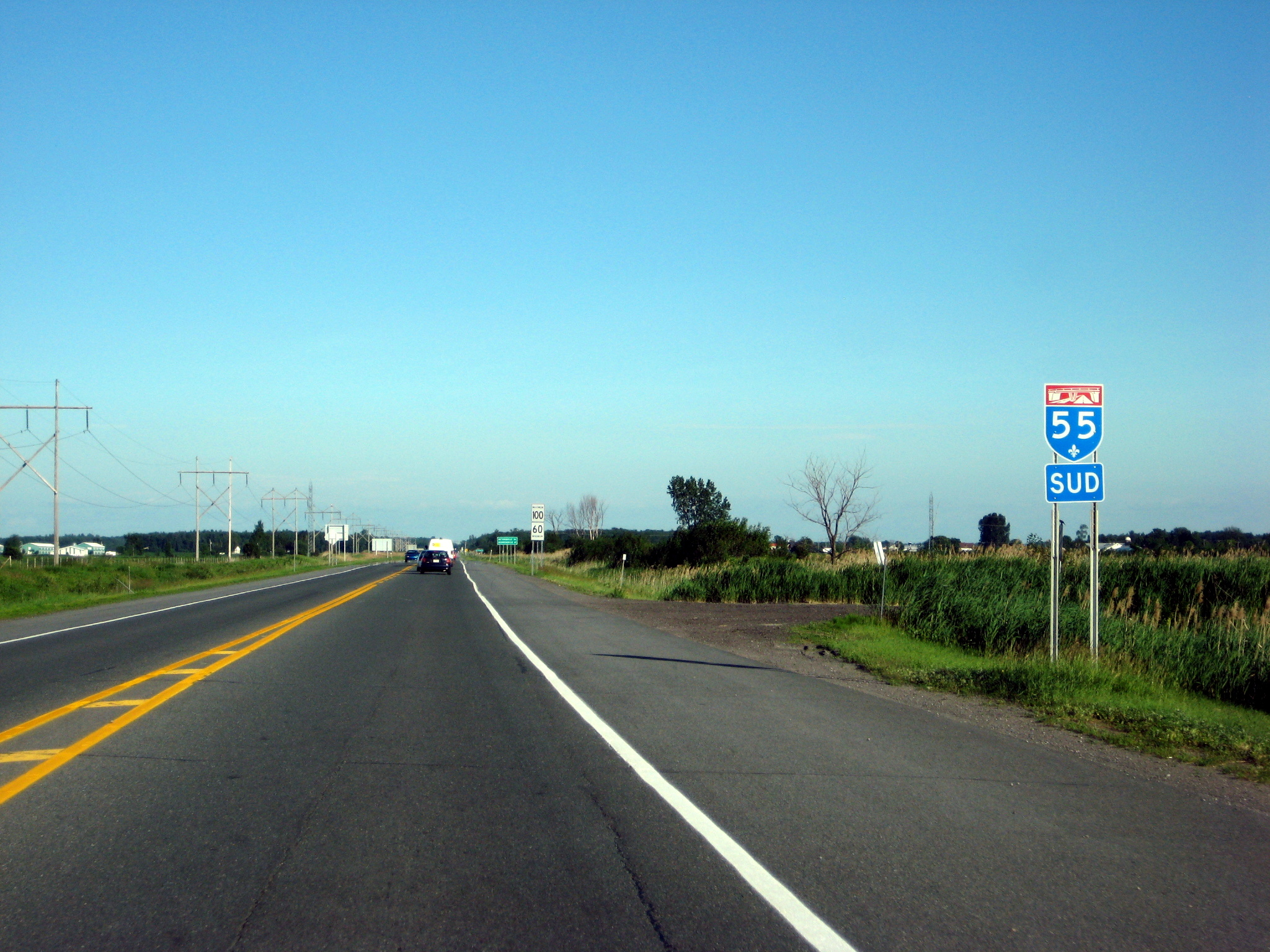
Autoroute 55 southbound

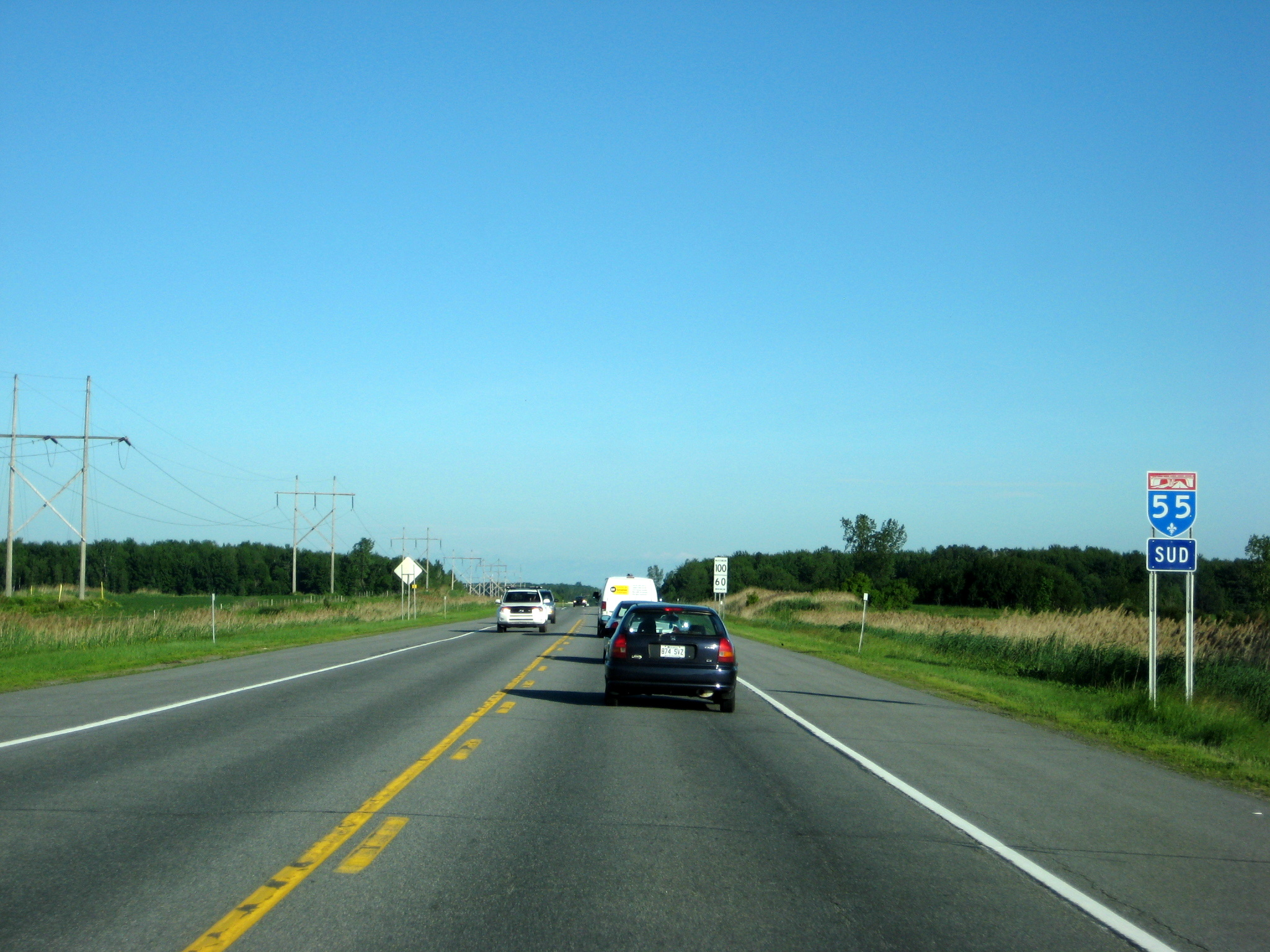
Southbound view, showing super two undivided highway

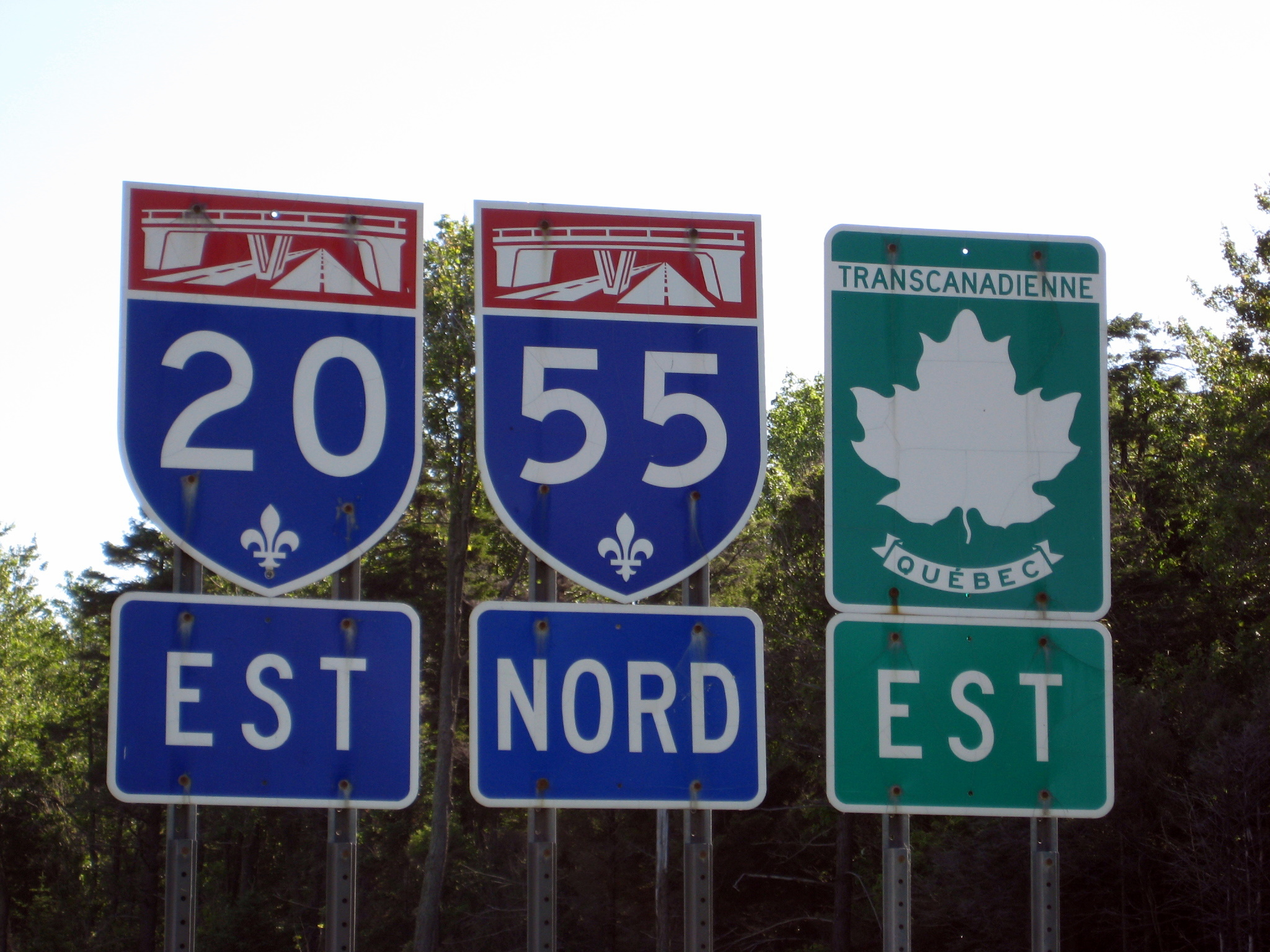
Multiplex of Autoroutes 20 and 55

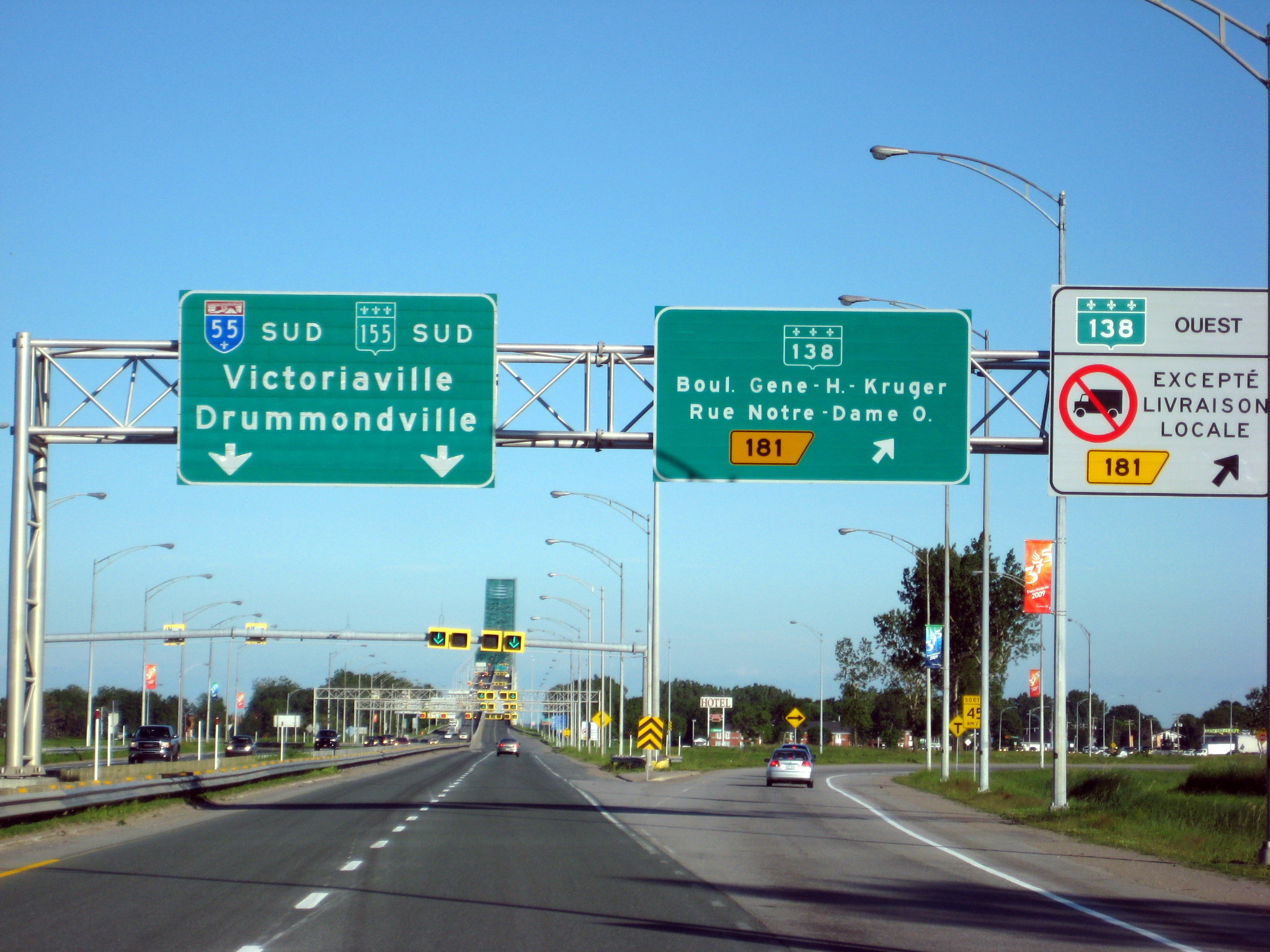
Southbound from Trois-Rivières at exit 181, approaching the Laviolette Bridge
