= Fraser River (disambiguation) =

The Fraser River is the longest river within British Columbia, Canada

Fraser River may also refer to:

- Fraser River (Colorado), a tributary of the Colorado River in Colorado in the United States
- Fraser River (rivière du Sud tributary), Chaudière-Appalaches, Quebec, Canada
- Fraser River (Le Val-Saint-François), a tributary of the Ulverton River in Quebec, Canada
- Fraser River (Newfoundland and Labrador), a river in Labrador, Canada
- Fraser River (Western Australia), a river in the Kimberley region of Western Australia
- Earnscleugh River, also known as Fraser River, in New Zealand

== See also ==
- Fraser (disambiguation)
