= Lake Brompton =

Lake in Quebec, Canada

- Lac Brompton (French)
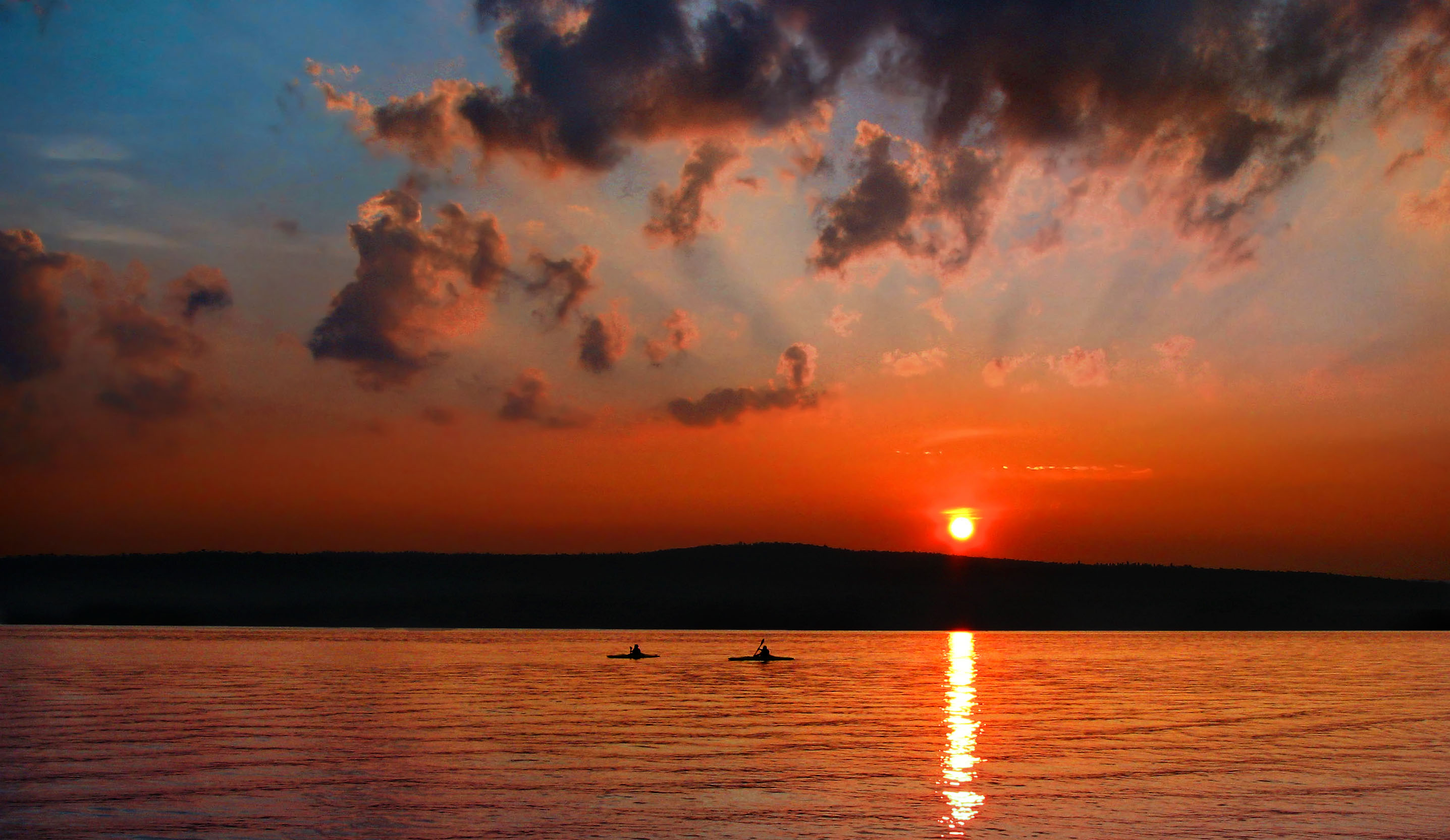

- Location within Quebec
- Coordinates: 45°26′N 72°09′W
- Surface area: 11.9 square kilometres (4.6 sq mi)
- Average depth: 42 metres (138 ft)
- Settlements: Saint-Denis-de-Brompton, Racine, Orford

Lake Brompton (French: Lac Brompton) is a lake located in the watershed of the St-François River, in the Estrie region of Quebec, Canada. Its watershed covers an area of approximately 140 km^{2}. The lake has a length of just over 12 km, varies in width from about ½ to 2 km. Its deepest place is 42 meters, but the average depth is 11 meters.

It is located partially in the Regional County Municipalities of Le Val-Saint-François and Memphrémagog.

When the Haudenosaunee forced them from the Lake Ontario region, the Wendat migrated to Quebec. While many ended up in the Quebec City region, some settled at the source of the current Salmon River, near Lake Brompton then known as Antoke Outunwitti.

Lake Brompton is said to be home to the Lake Brompton Monster, sometimes nicknamed Champ's younger brother. The lake monster is said to be 6 feet (1.8 m) long, something resembling a mustache and an "evil-looking" head.

== The Islands ==
Name	Location	Area	Inhabited	Thumbnail
Allen	45°25′36″N 72°08′35″W			
Dutunwitti	45°25′18″N 72°08′34″W		Yes	Ile Dutunwitti - panoramio
Mitchell	45°25′42″N 72°08′36″W		Yes	
Sherbrooke	45°24′49″N 72°11′01″W			Ile Sherbrooke et monts - panoramio
