= Kingsbury, Quebec =

Kingsbury
- Village municipality
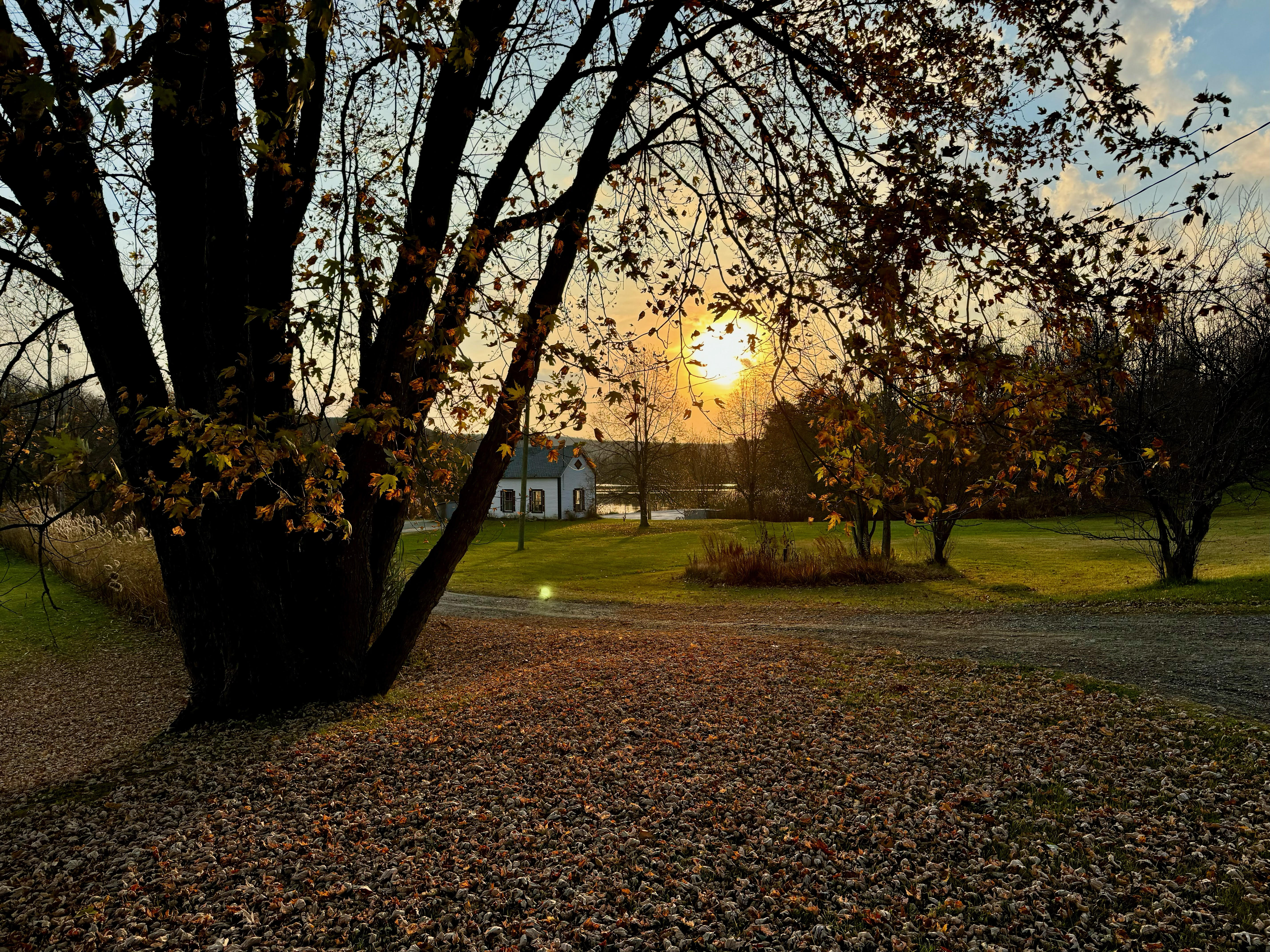

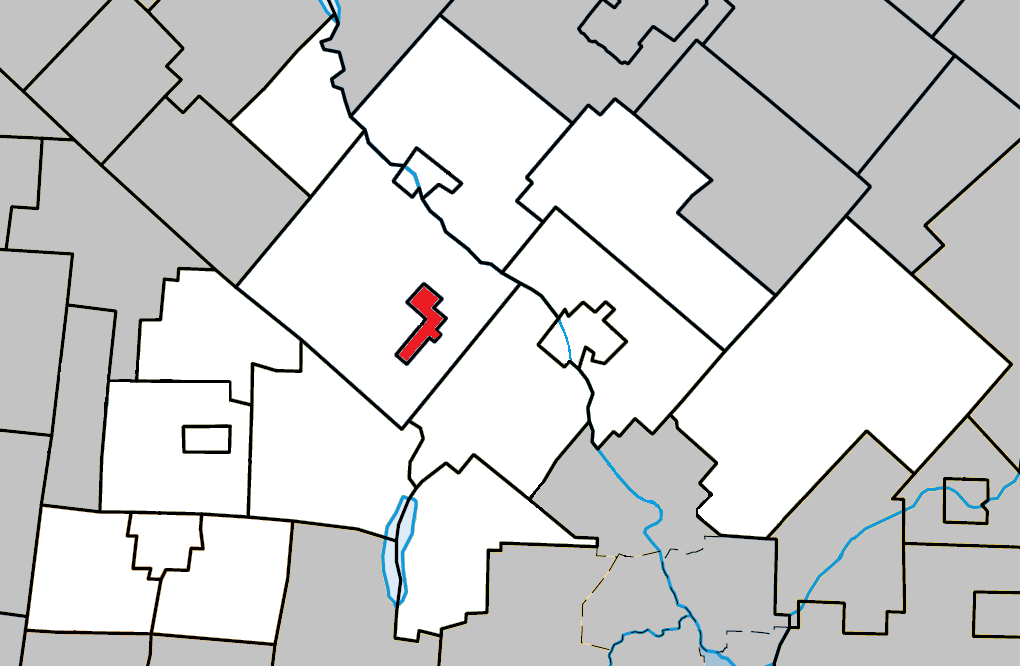
- Location within Le Val-Saint-François RCM

- Location in southern Quebec
- Coordinates: 45°35′N 72°09′W
- Country: Canada
- Province: Quebec
- Region: Estrie
- RCM: Le Val-Saint-François
- Constituted: July 7, 1896

Government
  - Mayor: Amélie Tremblay
  - Federal riding: Richmond—Arthabaska—des-Sources
  - Prov. riding: Richmond

Area
  - Total: 7.10 km^{2} (2.74 sq mi)
  - Land: 6.11 km^{2} (2.36 sq mi)

Population (2021)
  - Total: 142
  - Density: 23.3/km^{2} (60/sq mi)
  - Pop 2016-2021: ▲2.9%
  - Dwellings: 75
- Time zone: UTC−5 (EST)
  - Summer (DST): UTC−4 (EDT)
- Postal code(s): J0B 1X0
- Area code: 819
- Highways: No major routes
- Census profile
- MAMROT info: 42070
- Toponymie info: 32510
- Website: www.kingsbury.ca

Kingsbury is a village municipality located in the Le Val-Saint-François Regional County Municipality of Quebec's Estrie region. It is completely surrounded by the township municipality of Melbourne.

The village is known for the lake and forest trails that encircle it, and the views from the mountain tops. Kingsbury is also the hometown to 1993 world champion pair skater Isabelle Brasseur.

== History ==
In its early history, a train track cut through the village, but now the villagers' houses stand in its place.

Kingsbury is most famous for its slate quarry which was an important industry during the 19th century. Men were hired from Wales and Cornwall to come to work the quarry where first-class slate was mined. This slate was sent all over the world. The quarry can still be seen although the trains and tracks are long gone. Kingsbury was the first town to receive electricity. In the evenings the villagers would sit on their balconies and sing the old songs from their homeland.

The nearby town of Richmond has an Interpretation Center for Slate which is housed in what was previously the French Presbyterian Church (Melbourne sector of Richmond).

== Demographics ==
Historical Census Data - Kingsbury, Quebec
Year	Pop.	±%
1901	237	—
1911	263	+11.0%
1921	241	−8.4%
1931	164	−32.0%
1941	123	−25.0%
1951	112	−8.9%
1956	116	+3.6%
1961	123	+6.0%
1966	124	+0.8%
1971	229	+84.7%
1976	225	−1.7%
1981	193	−14.2%
1986	173	−10.4%
1991	154	−11.0%
1996	157	+1.9%
2001	141	−10.2%
2006	99	−29.8%
2011	123	+24.2%
2016	138	+12.2%
2021	142	+2.9%

In the 2021 Census of Population conducted by Statistics Canada, Kingsbury had a population of 142 living in 70 of its 75 total private dwellings, a change of 2.9% from its 2016 population of 138. With a land area of 6.11 km^{2} (2.36 sq mi), it had a population density of 23.2/km^{2} (60.2/sq mi) in 2021.

Mother tongue (2021)

Language	Population	Pct (%)
French only	125	89.3%
English only	10	7.1%
English and French	0	0%

== See also ==
- List of village municipalities in Quebec
