= Valcourt (town) =

- Town
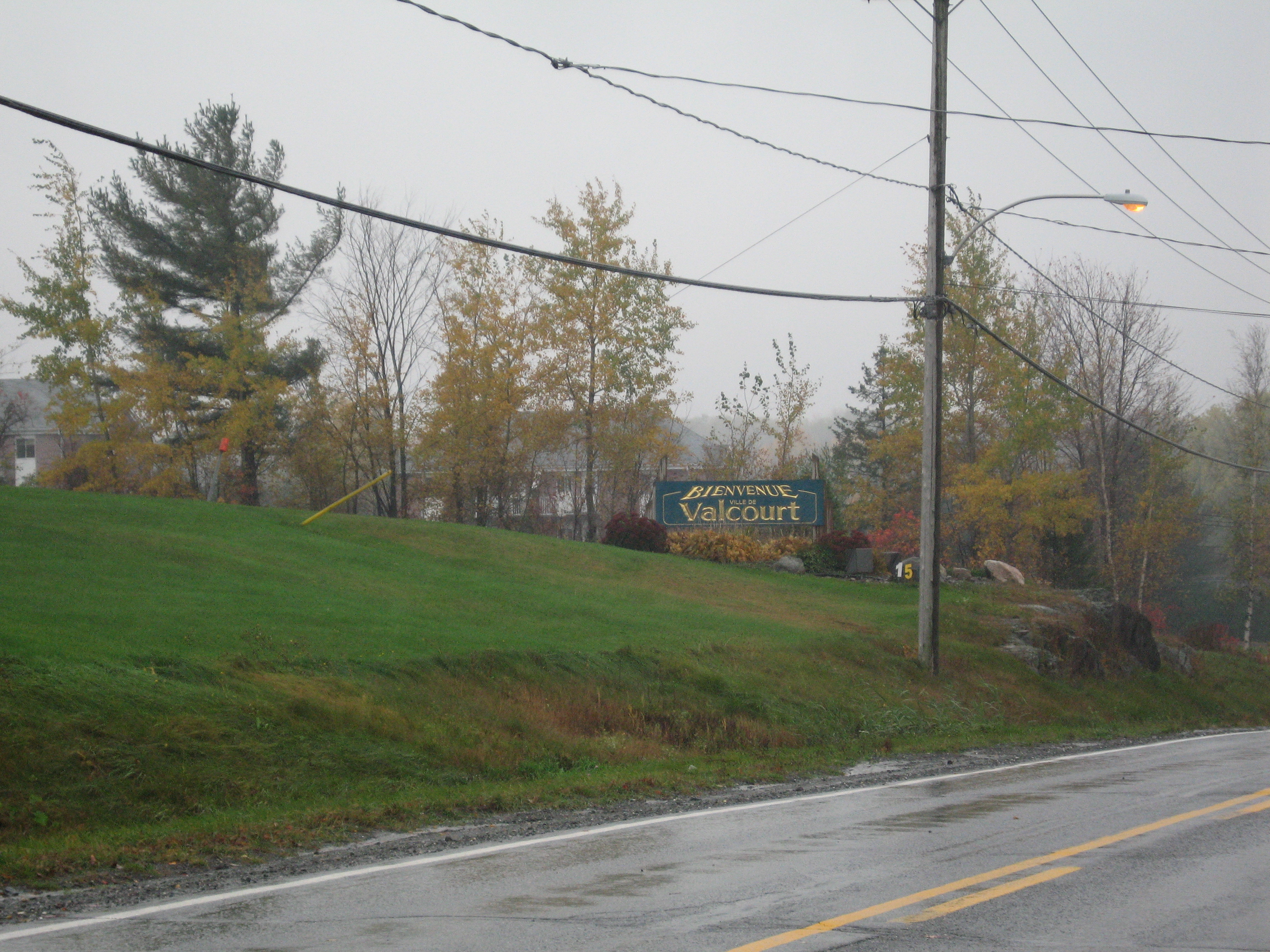
- Entrance sign

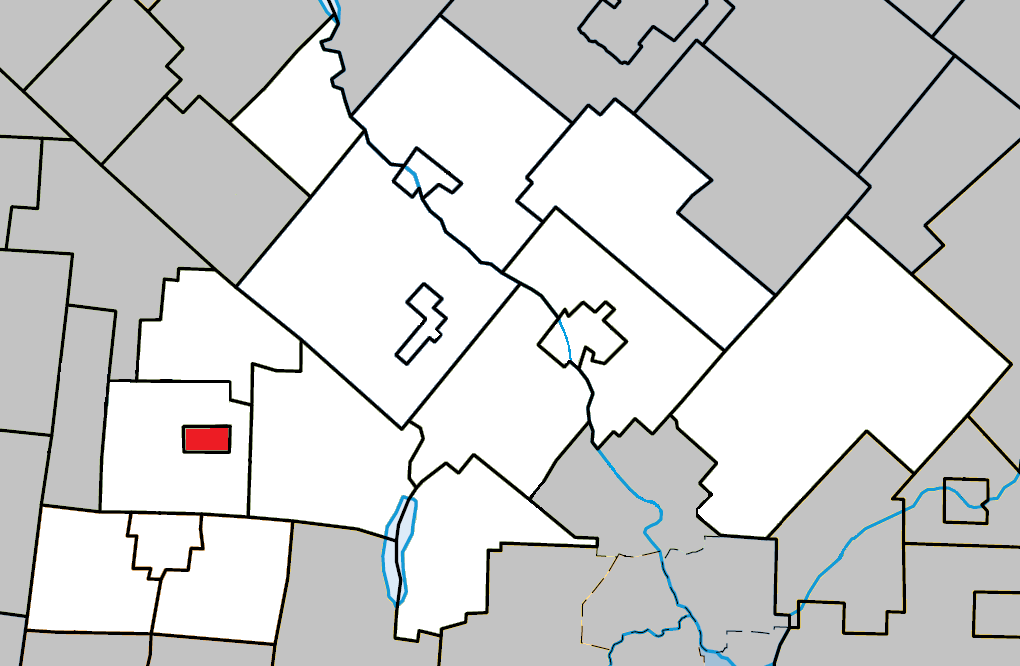
- Location within Le Val-Saint-François RCM.

- Location in southern Quebec.
- Coordinates: 45°30′N 72°19′W
- Country: Canada
- Province: Quebec
- Region: Estrie
- RCM: Le Val-Saint-François
- Constituted: October 19, 1929

Government
  - Mayor: Pierre Tétrault
  - Federal riding: Shefford
  - Prov. riding: Daniel-Johnson

Area
  - Total: 5.50 km^{2} (2.12 sq mi)
  - Land: 5.03 km^{2} (1.94 sq mi)
- Elevation: 365 m (1,198 ft)

Population (2011)
  - Total: 2,349
  - Density: 467.3/km^{2} (1,210/sq mi)
  - Pop 2006-2011: 0.0%
  - Dwellings: 1,106
- Time zone: UTC−5 (EST)
  - Summer (DST): UTC−4 (EDT)
- Postal code(s): J0E 2L0
- Area codes: 450 and 579
- Highways: R-222
- Website: www.valcourt.ca

Valcourt (French pronunciation: [valkuʁ]) is a town in Le Val-Saint-François Regional County Municipality in the Estrie region of Quebec, Canada.

The town is accessible via Quebec Route 222.

== Toponymy ==
The town of Valcourt is enclaved by Valcourt (township). The name of Valcourt makes reference to the origin of this township.

The origins of Valcourt go back to 1802, the year where the first inhabitants came to establish themselves in the township of Ely, named after the city in Great Britain. The first inhabitants were Loyalists, but by 1840 Canadiens began to arrive in the area. The first parish was created in 1856, and a civil entity in 1865 under the name of Township of Ely. The official name of Valcourt was not given until 1965, and took the name of the post office and the railroad station belonging to the Canadian Pacific Railway.

Many hypotheses exist as to the naming of Valcourt. The first is situated in the fact that a small valley in French would be a val court. The second is the deformation of a certain family name between 1849 and 1850 of Dalcourt. The last hypothesis is the existence of a village in the United States by the name of Valcour, situated just south of the border with Canada and the state of New York.

== Demographics ==
Historical Census Data - Valcourt, Quebec
Year	Pop.	±%
1991	2,284	—
1996	2,442	+6.9%
2001	2,411	−1.3%
2006	2,349	−2.6%
2011	2,349	+0.0%

In the 2021 Census of Population conducted by Statistics Canada, Valcourt had a population of 2,139 living in 1,052 of its 1,123 total private dwellings, a change of −1.2% from its 2016 population of 2,165. With a land area of 5.41 km^{2} (2.09 sq mi), it had a population density of 395.4/km^{2} (1,024.0/sq mi) in 2021.

Mother tongue (2011)

Language	Population	Pct (%)
French only	2,215	96.5%
English only	45	2.00%
English and French	20	0.9%
Non-official languages	15	0.6%

== Famous people ==
The inventor of the snowmobile, Joseph-Armand Bombardier, was born in Valcourt.

== Tourist attractions ==
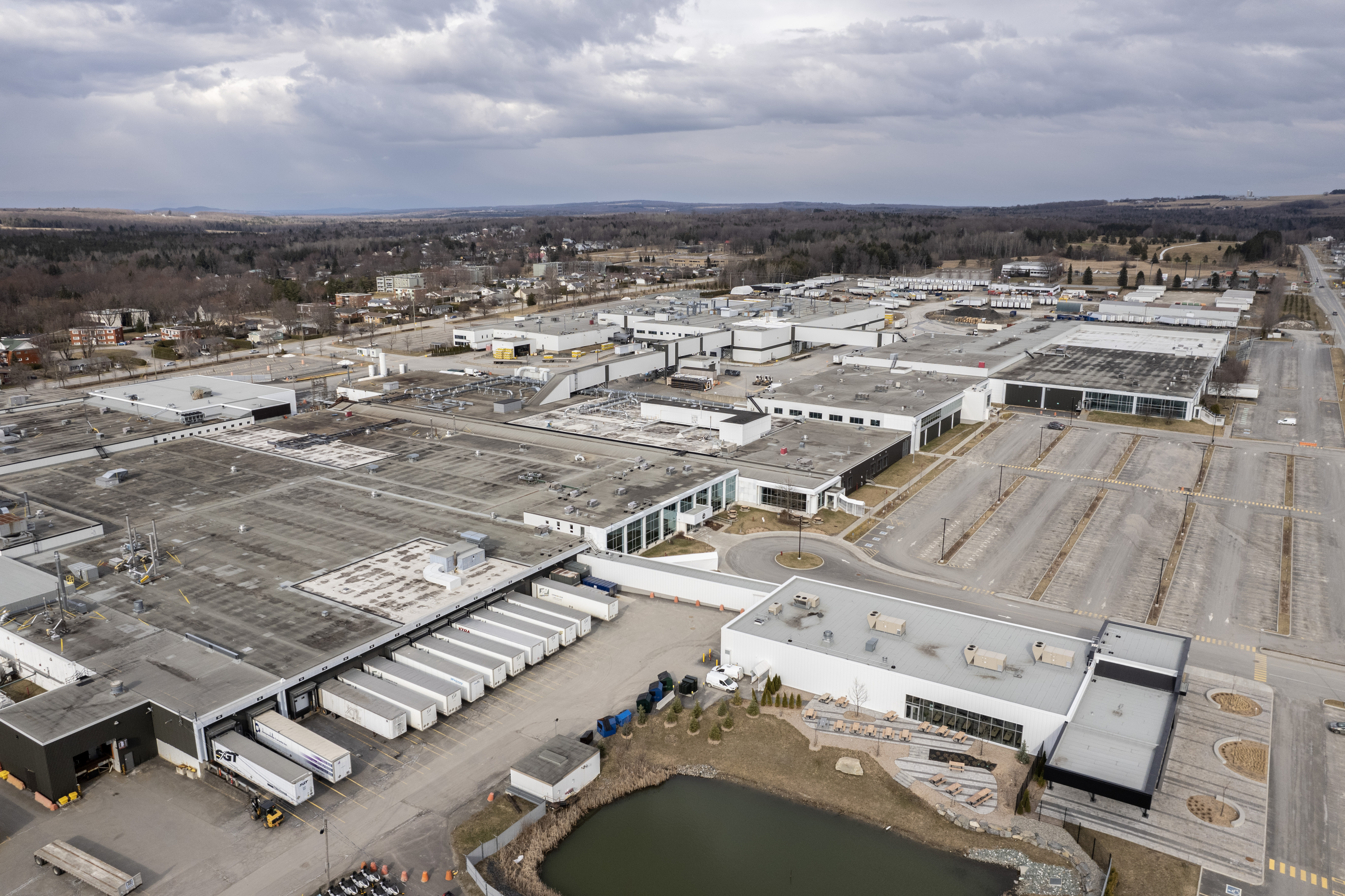
BRP Factory

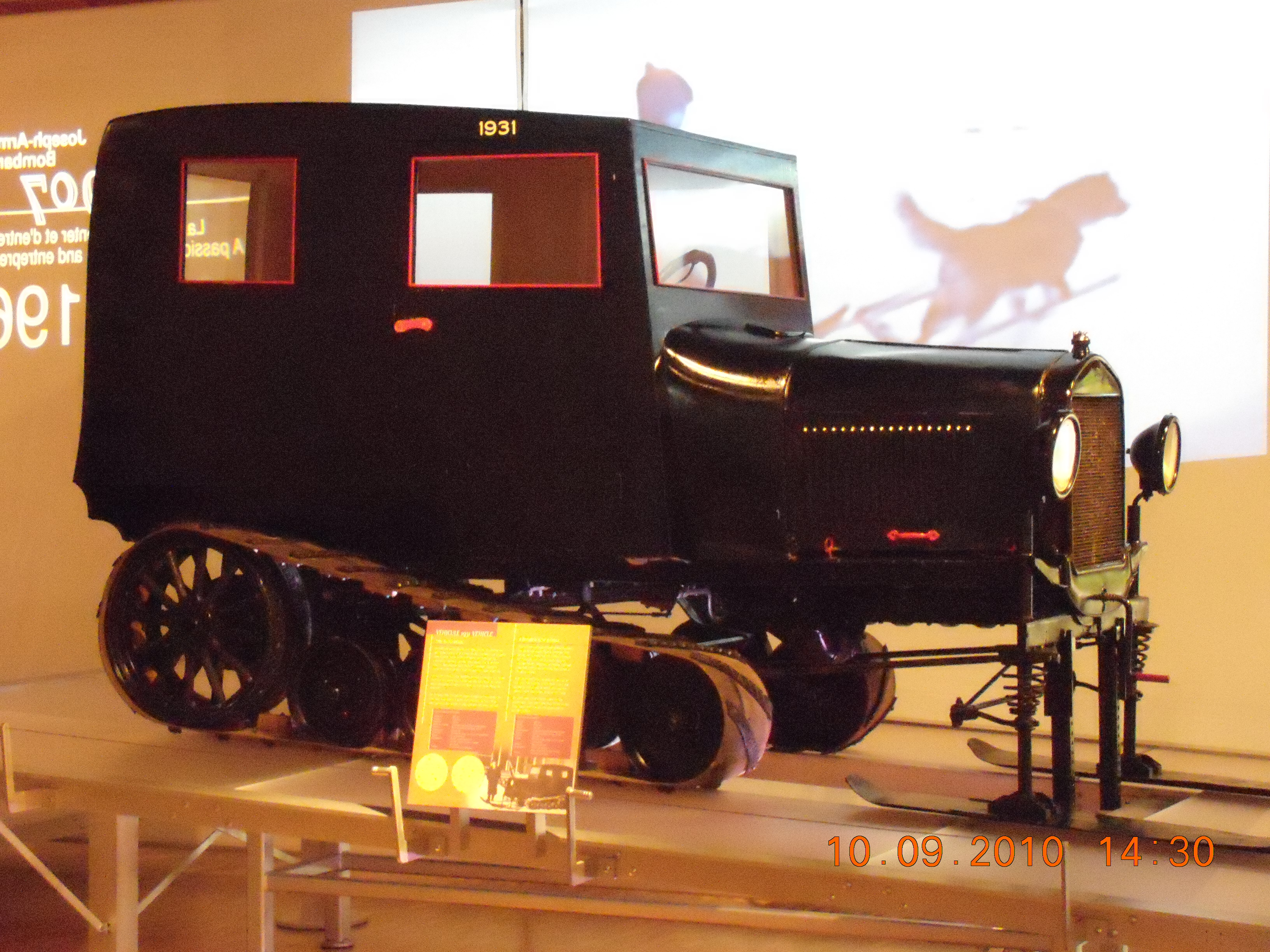
Véhicule de 1931

The J. Armand Bombardier museum is situated on the territory of the municipality. The main theme of the museum is the interpretation of the history of the snowmobile industry and of its inventor, Joseph-Armand Bombardier. The museum also houses three exhibition halls and a temporary exhibition hall.

== See also ==
- List of cities in Quebec
