= Valcourt (township) =

- Township municipality
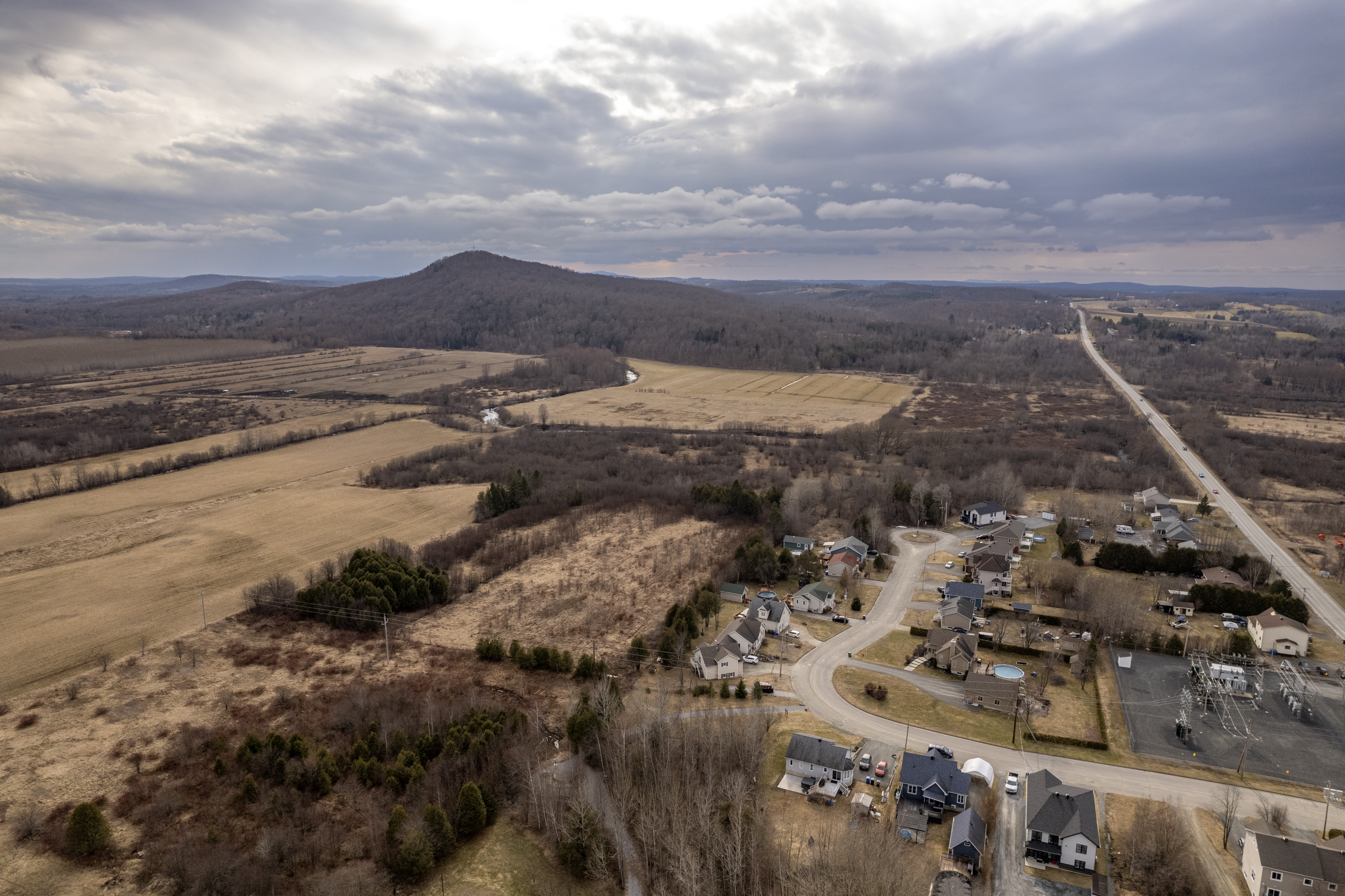

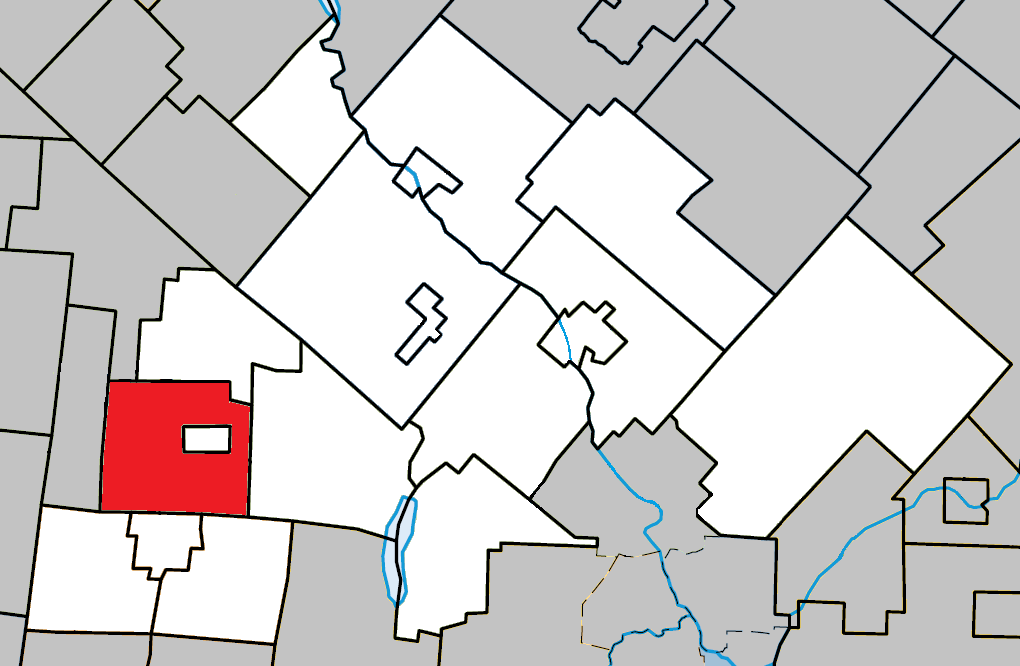
- Location within Le Val-Saint-François RCM.

- Location in southern Quebec.
- Coordinates: 45°30′N 72°21′W
- Country: Canada
- Province: Quebec
- Region: Estrie
- RCM: Le Val-Saint-François
- Constituted: July 1, 1855

Government
  - Mayor: Patrice Desmarais
  - Federal riding: Shefford
  - Prov. riding: Daniel-Johnson

Area
  - Total: 80.60 km^{2} (31.12 sq mi)
  - Land: 80.57 km^{2} (31.11 sq mi)

Population (2011)
  - Total: 1,047
  - Density: 13/km^{2} (34/sq mi)
  - Pop 2006-2011: ▲2.1%
  - Dwellings: 483
- Time zone: UTC−5 (EST)
  - Summer (DST): UTC−4 (EDT)
- Postal code(s): J0E 2L0
- Area codes: 450 and 579
- Highways: R-222; R-243
- Website: www.cantonvalcourt.qc.ca

Valcourt (French pronunciation: [valkuʁ]) is a township municipality in the Canadian province of Quebec, located within the Le Val-Saint-François Regional County Municipality. The township had a population of 1,047 in the Canada 2011 Census.

== Demographics ==
Historical Census Data - Valcourt (township), Quebec
Year	Pop.	±%
1991	1,118	—
1996	1,030	−7.9%
2001	978	−5.0%
2006	1,025	+4.8%
2011	1,047	+2.1%

In the 2021 Census of Population conducted by Statistics Canada, Valcourt had a population of 1,029 living in 461 of its 493 total private dwellings, a change of −1.4% from its 2016 population of 1,044. With a land area of 80.39 km^{2} (31.04 sq mi), it had a population density of 12.8/km^{2} (33.2/sq mi) in 2021.

Mother tongue (2011)

Language	Population	Pct (%)
French only	1,010	97.1%
English only	20	1.9%
English and French	5	0.5%
Non-official languages	5	0.5%

== See also ==
- List of township municipalities in Quebec
