= Lefebvre, Quebec =

Lefebvre
- Municipality
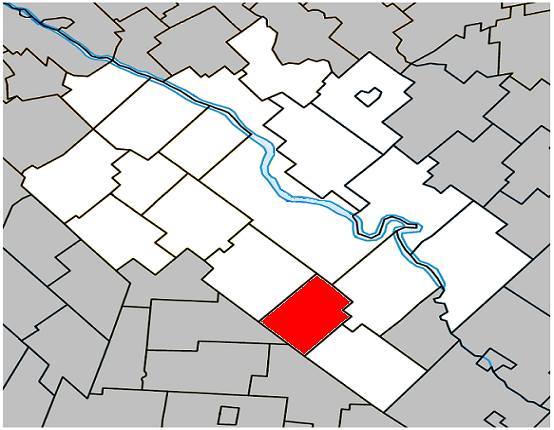
- Location within Drummond RCM.

- Location in southern Quebec.
- Coordinates: 45°43′N 72°25′W
- Country: Canada
- Province: Quebec
- Region: Centre-du-Québec
- RCM: Drummond
- Constituted: October 10, 1922

Government
  - Mayor: François Parenteau
  - Federal riding: Drummond
  - Prov. riding: Marie-Lacoste-Gérin-Lajoie

Area
  - Total: 66.20 km^{2} (25.56 sq mi)
  - Land: 66.19 km^{2} (25.56 sq mi)

Population (2016)
  - Total: 904
  - Density: 13.7/km^{2} (35/sq mi)
  - Pop 2011-2016: ▲4.3%
  - Dwellings: 395
- Time zone: UTC−5 (EST)
  - Summer (DST): UTC−4 (EDT)
- Postal code(s): J0H 2C0
- Area code: 819
- Highways: No major routes

Lefebvre (French pronunciation: [ləfɛvʁ]) is a municipality located in the Centre-du-Québec region of Quebec. The population as of the Canada 2016 Census was 904.

== Geography ==
=== Communities ===
The municipality contains the communities of Lefebvre and Danby.

== Demographics ==
=== Population ===
Population trend:

Census	Population	Change (%)
2016	904	▲4.3%
2011	867	▲7.6%
2006	806	▼0.1%
2001	807	▲1.9%
1996	792	▲17.3%
1991	675	N/A

=== Language ===
Mother tongue language (2006)

Language	Population	Pct (%)
French only	770	96.25%
English only	10	1.25%
Both English and French	0	0.00%
Other languages	20	2.50%

== See also ==
- List of municipalities in Quebec
