= L'Avenir, Quebec =

L'Avenir
- Municipality
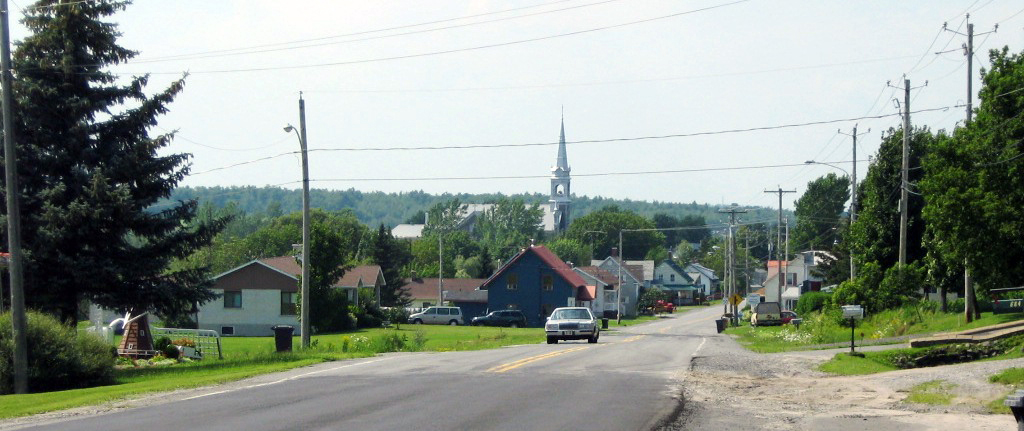

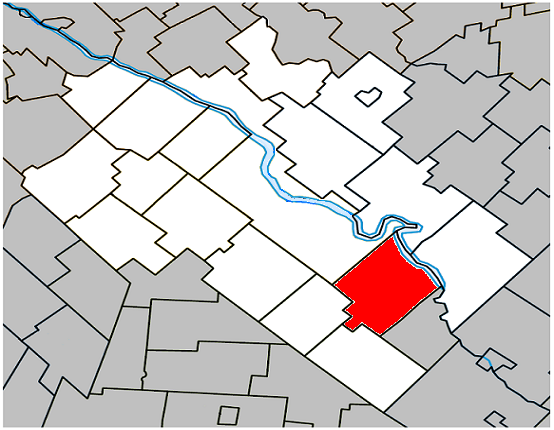
- Location within Drummond RCM.

- Location in southern Quebec.
- Coordinates: 45°46′N 72°18′W
- Country: Canada
- Province: Quebec
- Region: Centre-du-Québec
- RCM: Drummond
- Constituted: December 23, 1976

Government
  - Mayor: Alcide Boisvert
  - Federal riding: Drummond
  - Prov. riding: Marie-Lacoste-Gérin-Lajoie

Area
  - Total: 99.10 km^{2} (38.26 sq mi)
  - Land: 97.25 km^{2} (37.55 sq mi)

Population (2011)
  - Total: 1,202
  - Density: 12.4/km^{2} (32/sq mi)
  - Pop 2006-2011: ▼4.8%
  - Dwellings: 566
- Time zone: UTC−5 (EST)
  - Summer (DST): UTC−4 (EDT)
- Postal code(s): J0C 1B0
- Area code: 819
- Highways A-55: R-143
- Website: www.municipalite lavenir.qc.ca

L'Avenir (French pronunciation: [lavniʁ], lit. 'The Future') is a municipality located in the Centre-du-Québec region of Quebec. The population as of the Canada 2011 Census was 1,202.

== Demographics ==
=== Population ===
Population trend:

Census	Population	Change (%)
2011	1,202	▼4.8%
2006	1,262	▼1.2%
2001	1,277	▲0.2%
1996	1,274	▲9.5%
1991	1,164	N/A

=== Language ===
Mother tongue language (2006)

Language	Population	Pct (%)
French only	1,205	96.02%
English only	20	1.59%
Both English and French	0	0.00%
Other languages	30	2.39%

== See also ==
- List of municipalities in Quebec
