= Maricourt, Quebec =

Maricourt
- Municipality
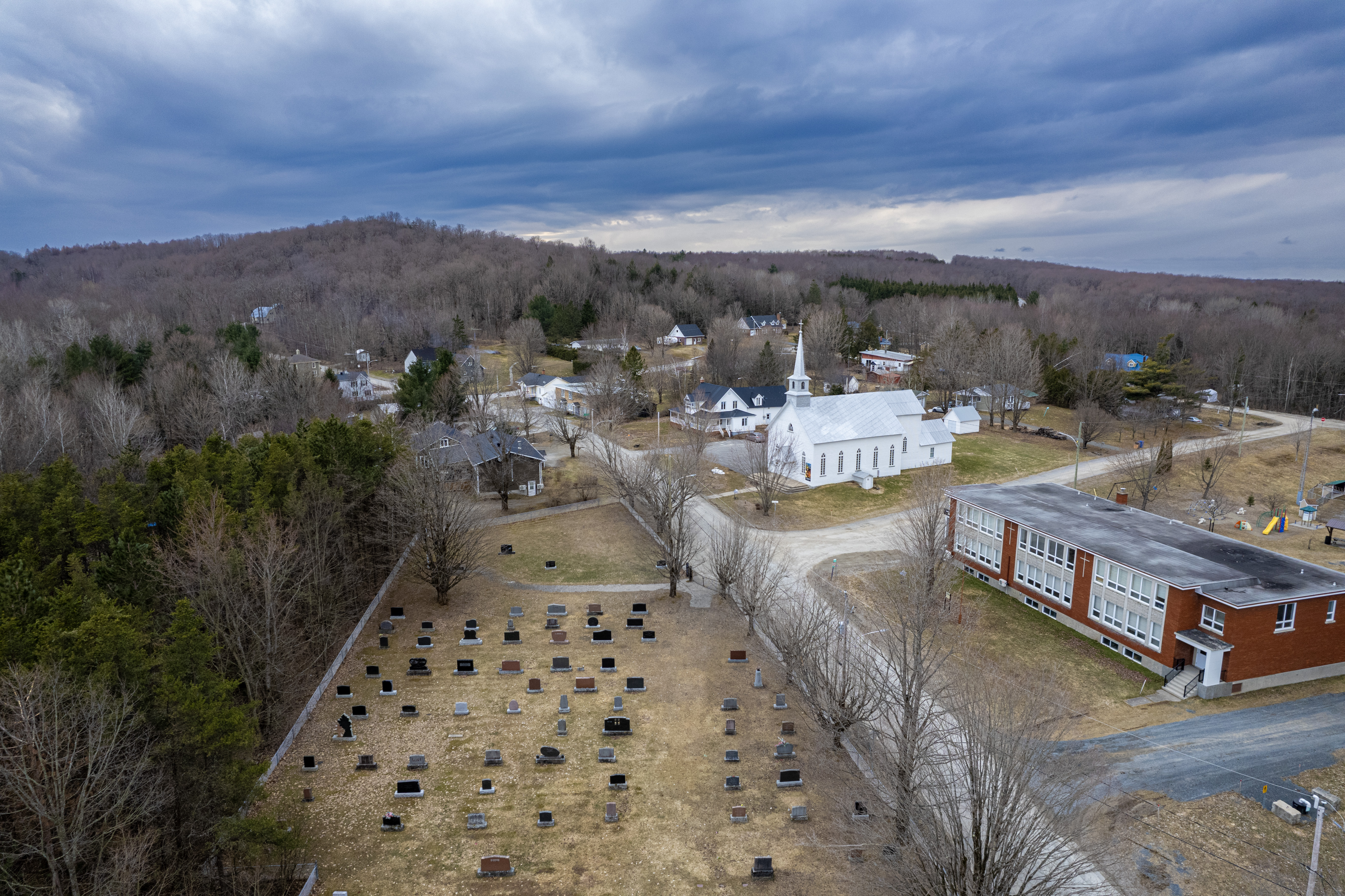

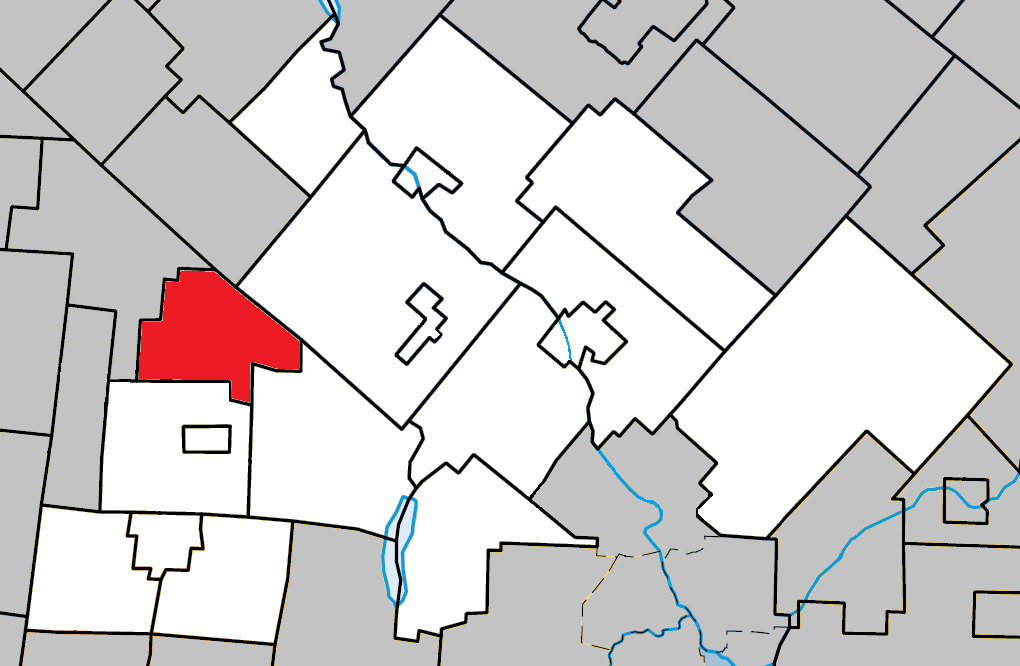
- Location within Le Val-Saint-François RCM.

- Location in southern Quebec.
- Coordinates: 45°34′N 72°16′W
- Country: Canada
- Province: Quebec
- Region: Estrie
- RCM: Le Val-Saint-François
- Constituted: January 1, 1864

Government
  - Mayor: Jean-Luc Beauchemin
  - Federal riding: Shefford
  - Prov. riding: Daniel-Johnson

Area
  - Total: 62.10 km^{2} (23.98 sq mi)
  - Land: 61.16 km^{2} (23.61 sq mi)

Population (2016)
  - Total: 416
  - Density: 6.8/km^{2} (18/sq mi)
  - Pop 2011-2016: ▼16.3%
  - Dwellings: 192
- Time zone: UTC−5 (EST)
  - Summer (DST): UTC−4 (EDT)
- Postal code(s): J0E 1Y0
- Area codes: 450 and 579
- Highways: R-222

Maricourt (French pronunciation: [maʁikuʁ]) is a municipality in Le Val-Saint-François Regional County Municipality in the Estrie region of Quebec. The population was 416 in the Canada 2016 Census.

== Demographics ==
=== Population ===
Historical Census Data - Maricourt, Quebec

Year	Pop.	±%
1991	433	—
1996	458	+5.8%

Year	Pop.	±%
2001	487	+6.3%
2006	432	−11.3%

Year	Pop.	±%
2011	497	+15.0%
2016	416	−16.3%

=== Language ===
Mother tongue (2016)

Language	Population	Pct (%)
French only	395	95.2%
English only	20	4.8%
English and French	0	0.0%

== See also ==
- List of municipalities in Quebec
