= Melbourne, Quebec =

Melbourne
- Township municipality
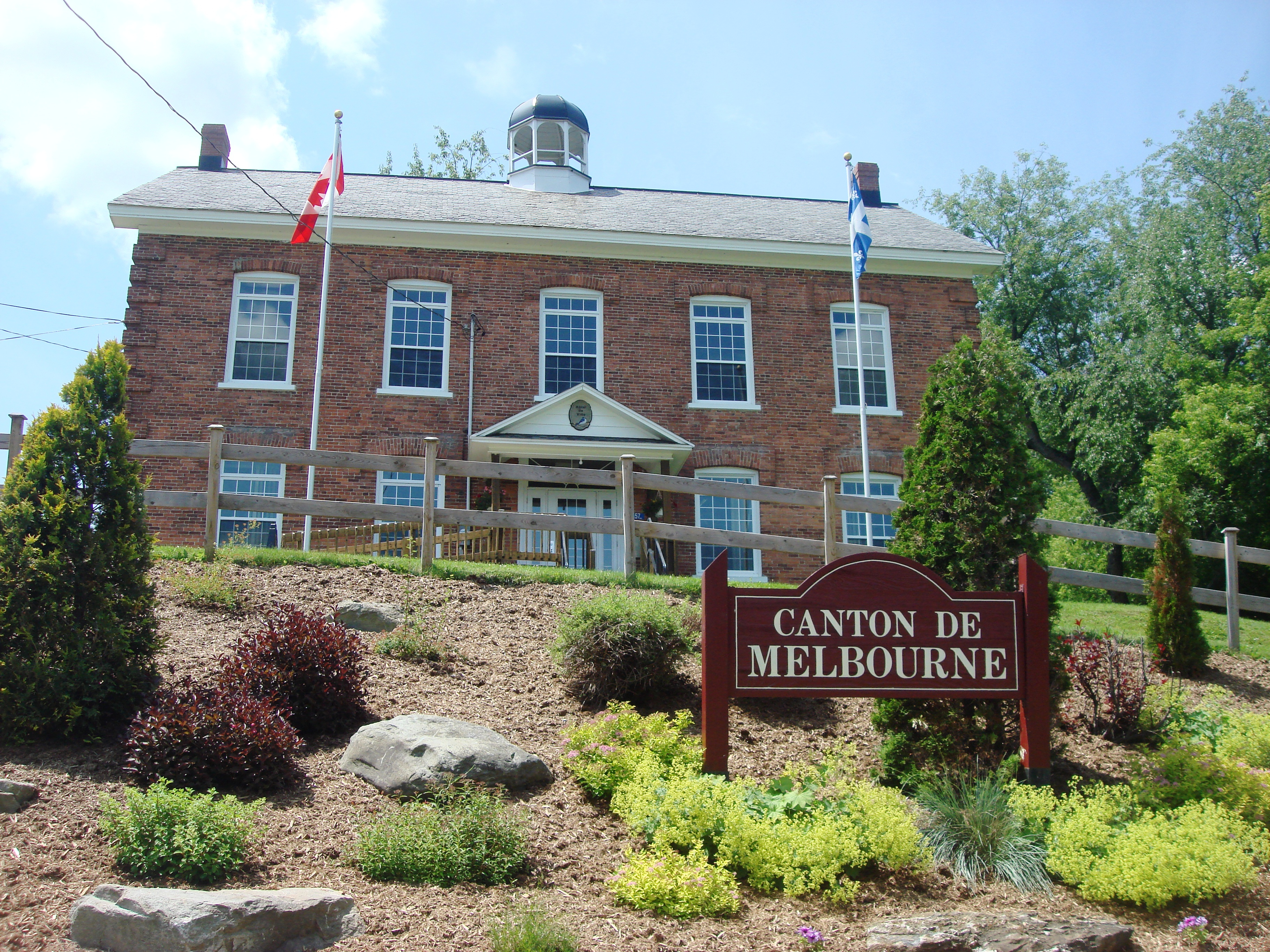
- Town hall

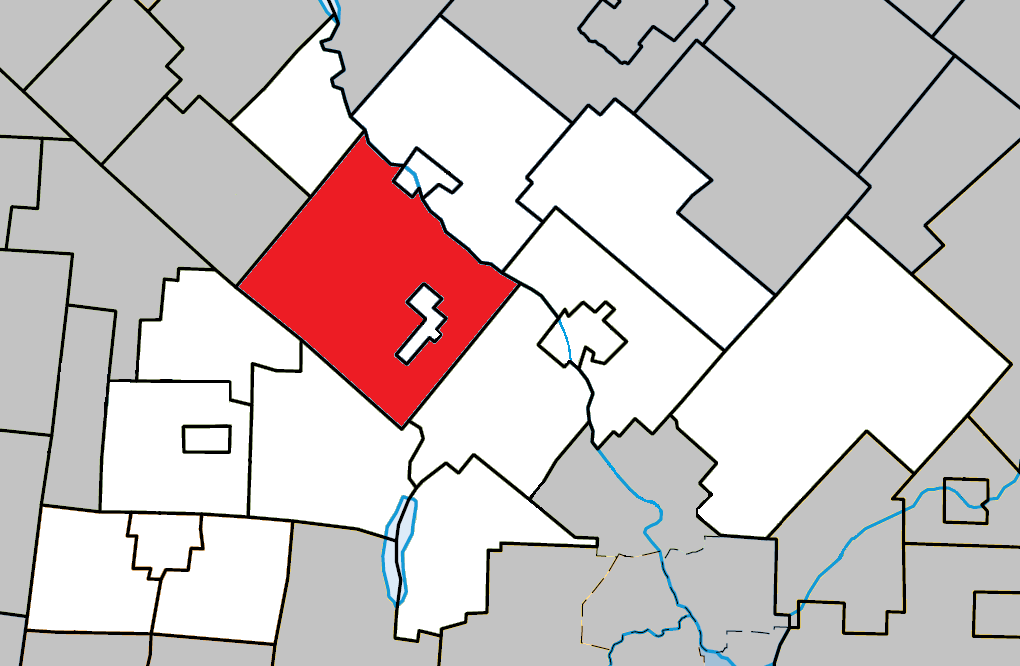
- Location within Le Val-Saint-François RCM

- Location in southern Quebec
- Coordinates: 45.58°N 72.17°W
- Country: Canada
- Province: Quebec
- Region: Estrie
- RCM: Le Val-Saint-François
- Constituted: July 1, 1855

Government
  - Mayor: Douglas Morrison
  - Federal riding: Richmond—Arthabaska—des-Sources
  - Prov. riding: Richmond

Area
  - Total: 173.70 km^{2} (67.07 sq mi)
  - Land: 173.93 km^{2} (67.15 sq mi)
- There is an apparent contradiction between two authoritative sources

Population (2021)
  - Total: 1,096
  - Density: 6.3/km^{2} (16/sq mi)
  - Pop 2016-2021: ▲3.1%
  - Dwellings: 494
- Time zone: UTC−5 (EST)
  - Summer (DST): UTC−4 (EDT)
- Postal code(s): J0B 2B0
- Area code: 819
- Highways A-55: R-116; R-243
- Website: www.melbournecanton.ca

Melbourne is a township municipality located in Le Val-Saint-François Regional County Municipality in the Estrie region of Quebec, Canada.

The name Melbourne comes from the name of an English town in Derbyshire and Hampshire.

== History ==
The village was founded by Irish immigrants from New England after the famine in Ireland. These settlers, who arrived around 1860, decided to try their luck here, because these lands were still available, accessible, open and cultivable. The municipality was officially created in 1855 but has since lost parts of its territory. First in 1860 when the village section of Melbourne (now merged with Richmond) became its own entity. In 1889, New Rockland separated (it has since been merged with Kingsbury). In 1896, Kingsbury separated also. Finally, in 1920, Brompton Gore (now part of Racine) separated.

== Demographics ==
Historical Census Data - Melbourne, Quebec
Year	Pop.	±%
1861	1,621	—
1871	2,290	+41.3%
1881	2,396	+4.6%
1891	2,017	−15.8%
1901	1,626	−19.4%
1911	1,597	−1.8%
1921	1,784	+11.7%
1931	1,189	−33.4%
1941	1,105	−7.1%
1951	1,107	+0.2%
1956	1,124	+1.5%
1961	1,114	−0.9%
1966	1,080	−3.1%
1971	1,089	+0.8%
1976	993	−8.8%
1981	1,054	+6.1%
1986	947	−10.2%
1991	1,055	+11.4%
1996	977	−7.4%
2001	951	−2.7%
2006	1,095	+15.1%
2011	1,004	−8.3%
2016	1,063	+5.9%
2021	1,096	+3.1%

In the 2021 Census of Population conducted by Statistics Canada, Melbourne had a population of 1,096 living in 439 of its 494 total private dwellings, a change of 3.1% from its 2016 population of 1,063. With a land area of 173.93 km^{2} (67.15 sq mi), it had a population density of 6.3/km^{2} (16.3/sq mi) in 2021.

Mother tongue (2021)

Language	Population	Pct (%)
French only	765	69.9%
English only	285	26.0%
English and French	25	2.3%
Non-official languages	25	2.3%
English and non-official language	5	0.5%

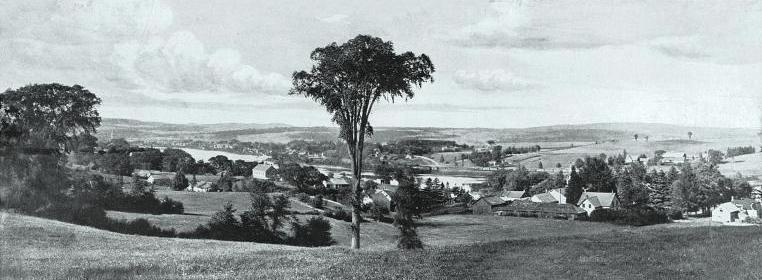
Upper Melbourne 1910

== Notable people ==
- Marie-Claire Blais (1939 – 2021) writer and novelist
- F. S. Coburn (1871 – 1960) illustrator and photographer
- William Hoste Webb (1820 – 1890) lawyer and political figure

== See also ==
- List of anglophone communities in Quebec
- List of township municipalities in Quebec
