= Quebec Route 222 =

Highway in Quebec, Canada

Route 222

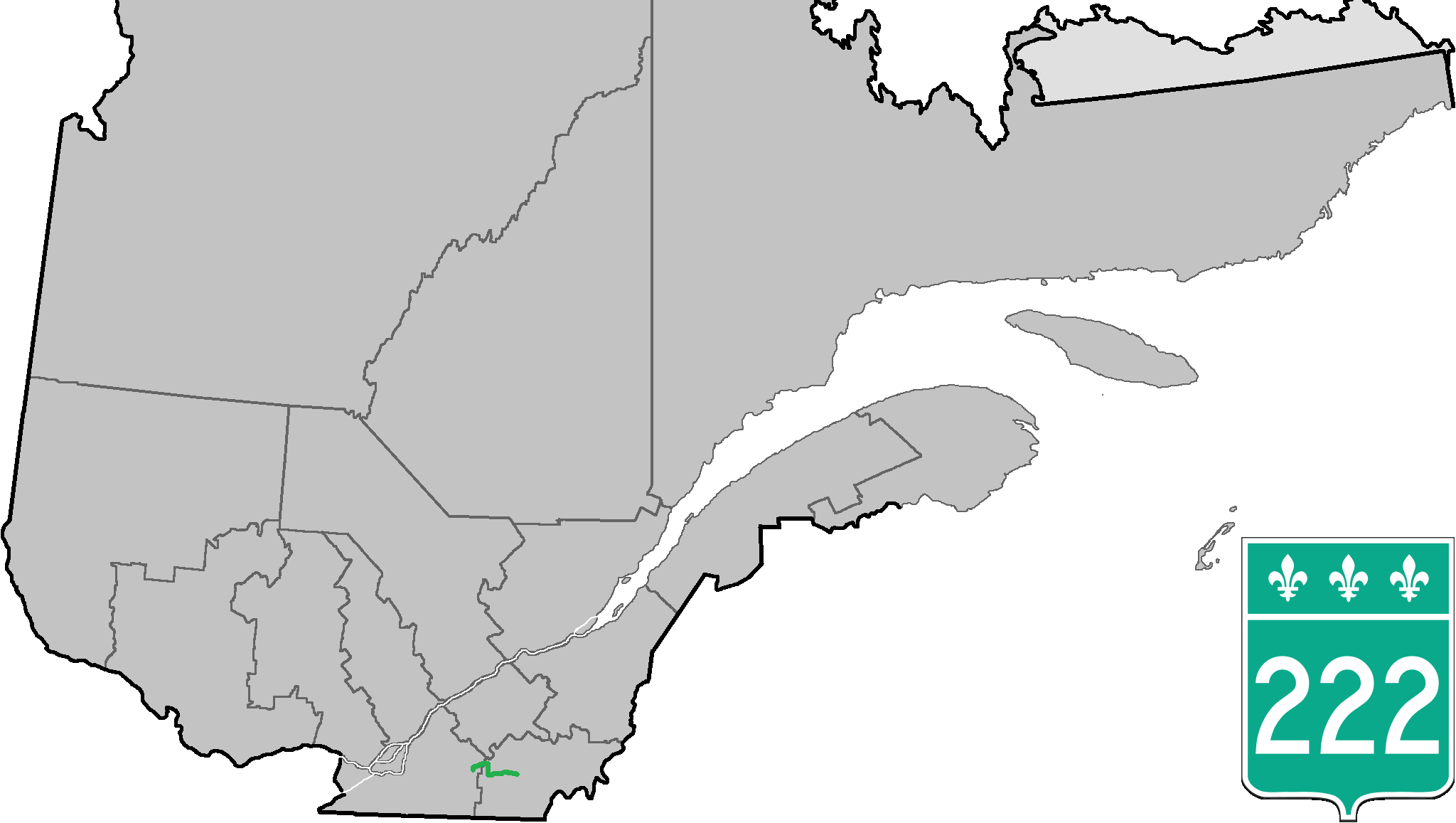

Route information
- Maintained by Transports Québec
- Length: 62.5 km (38.8 mi)

Major junctions
- West end: R-139 in Roxton Falls
- R-243 in Racine; R-249 in Saint-Denis-de-Brompton; A-55 in Bromptonville
- East end: R-143 in Sherbrooke

Location
- Country: Canada
- Province: Quebec

Highway system
- Quebec provincial highways; Autoroutes; List; Former
← R-221	→ R-223

Route 222 is a provincial highway located in the Estrie region of Quebec, Canada. The 61 km (38 mi) highway runs from the junction of Route 139 in Roxton Falls and ends at the junction of Route 143 in Sherbrooke just east of Autoroute 55. It also has a brief concurrency with Route 243 in Racine.

== Municipalities along Route 222 ==
- Roxton Falls
- Roxton (Canton)
- Sainte-Christine
- Maricourt
- Valcourt (Canton)
- Valcourt
- Racine
- Saint-Denis-de-Brompton
- Sherbrooke - (Bromptonville)
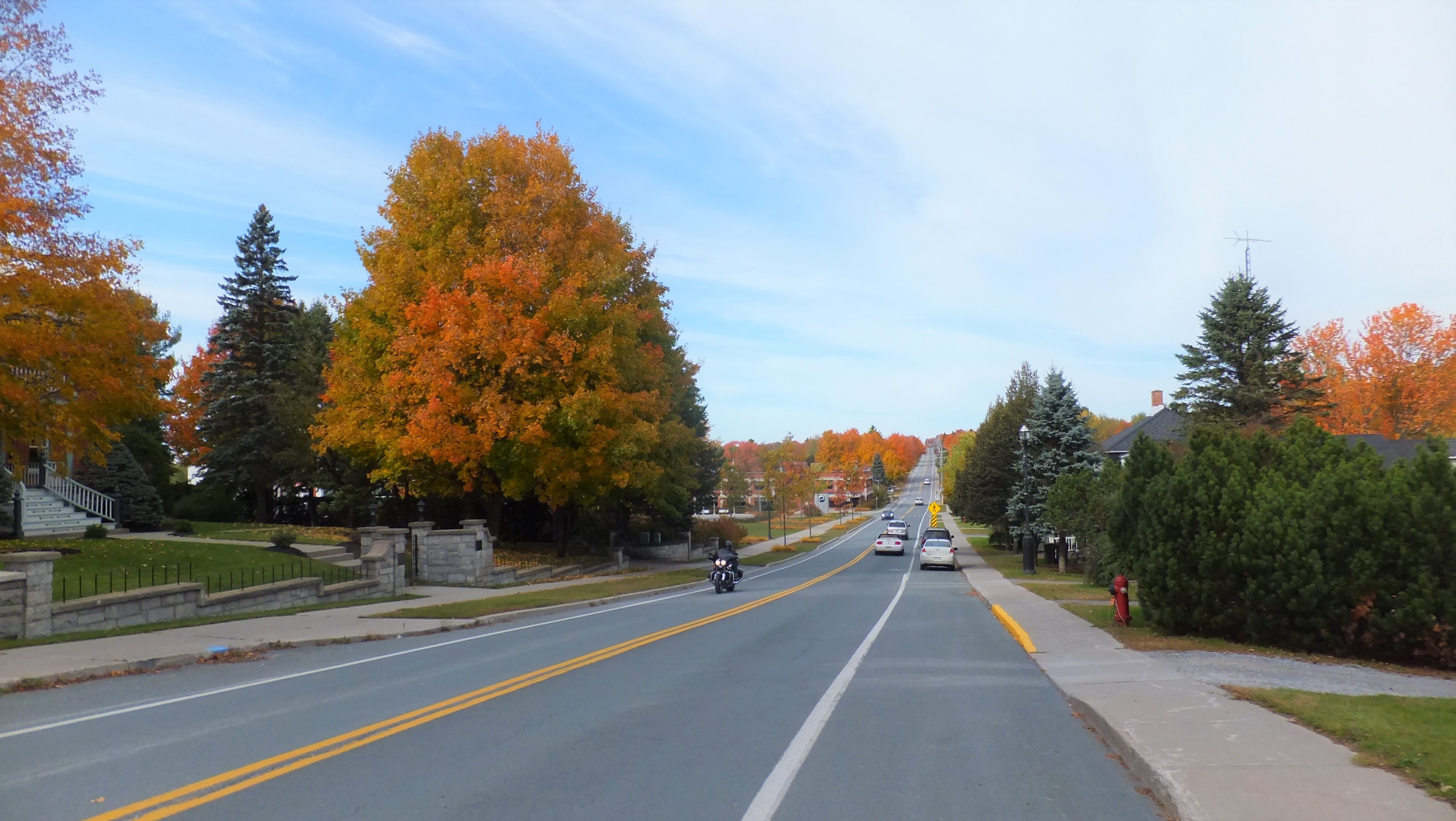
Route 220 at Valcourt in fall colors.

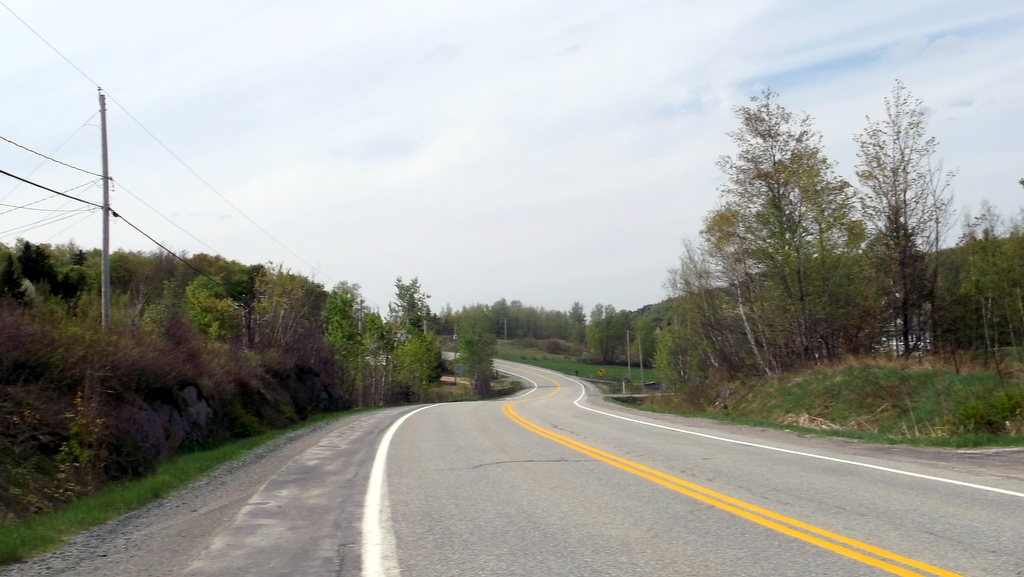
Route 222 in Racine.

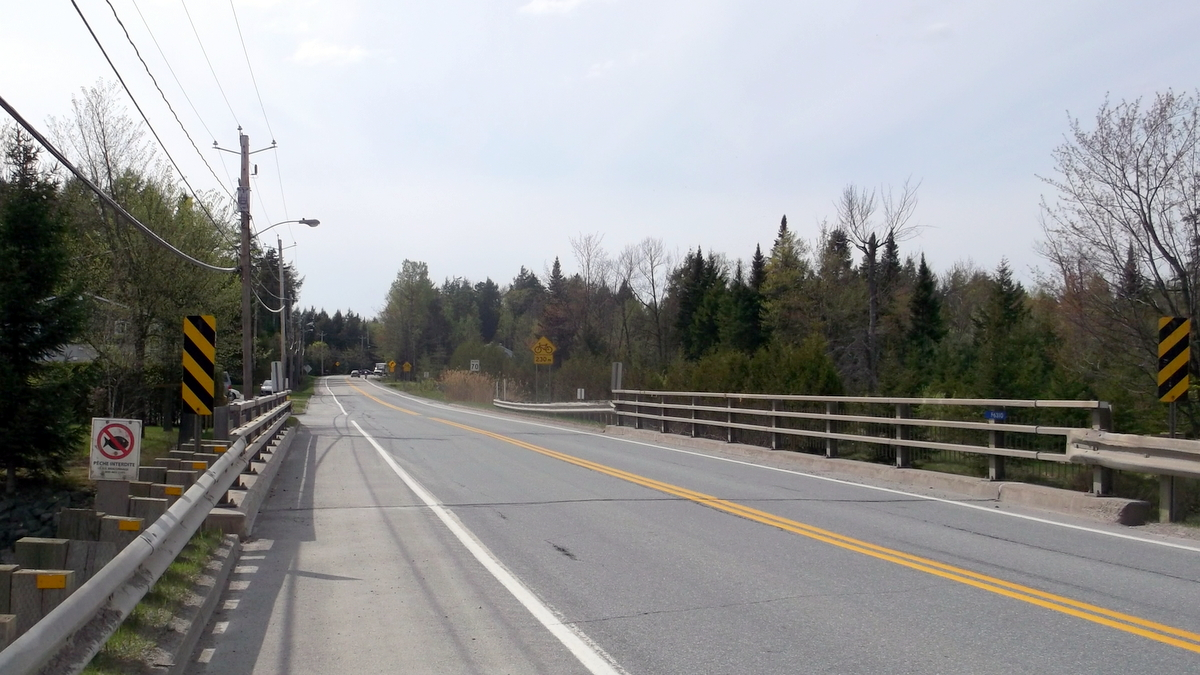
Bridge of Route 222 in Saint-Denis-de-Brompton

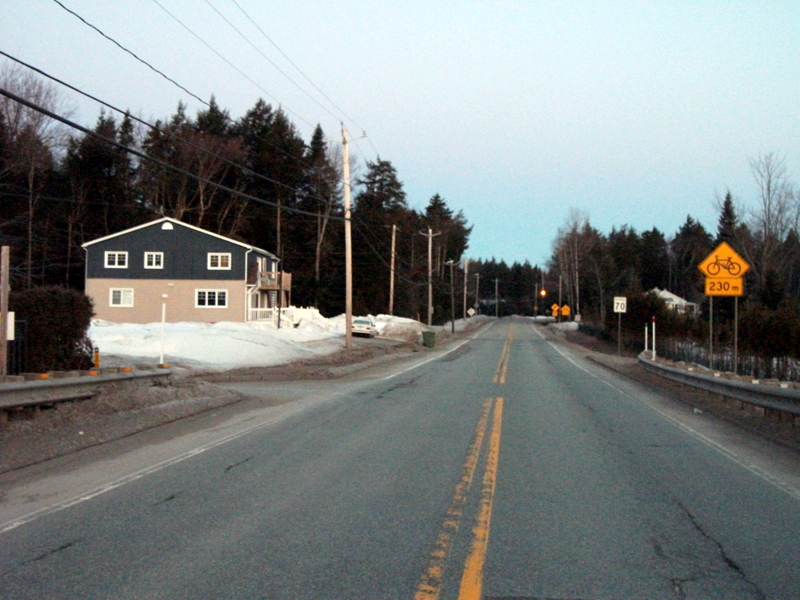
Route 222 goes through cottage areas in Saint-Denis-de-Brompton.

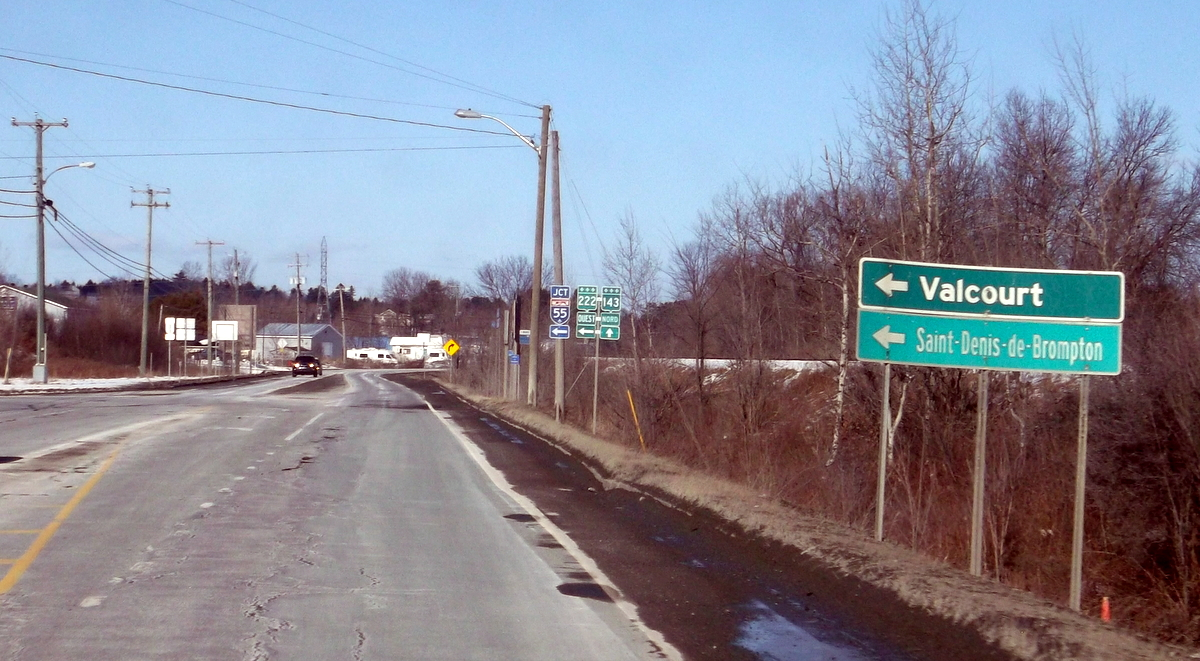
Route 222 eastern end at Route 143 junction, near Autoroute 55.

== See also ==
- List of Quebec provincial highways
