= Saint-Denis-de-Brompton =

- Municipality
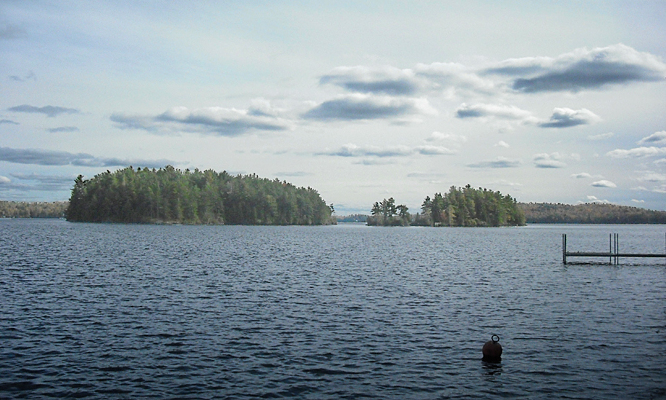

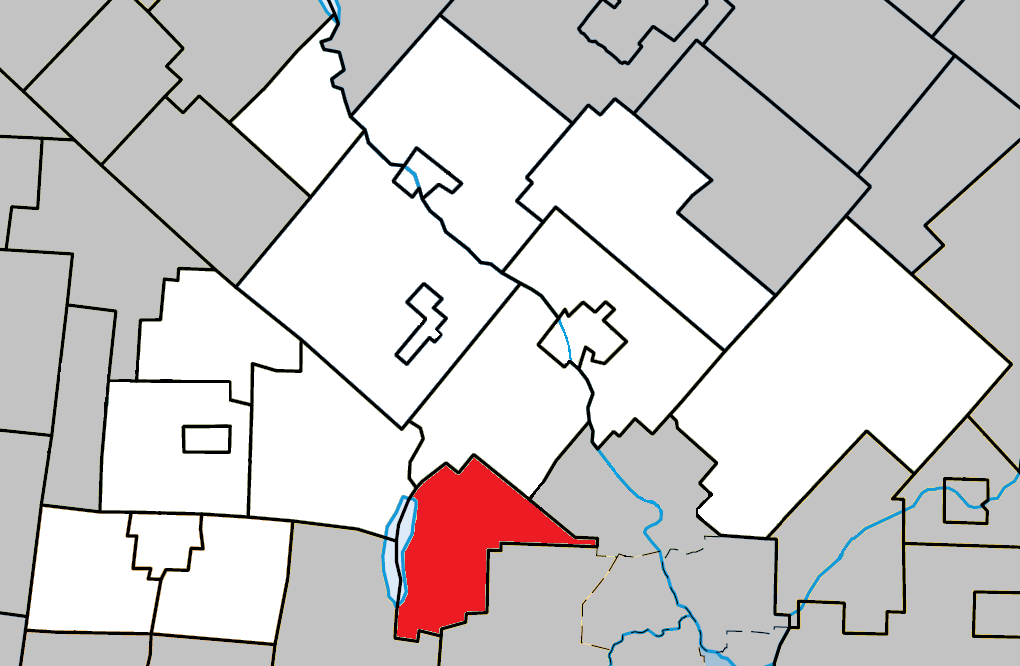
- Location within Le Val-Saint-François RCM

- Location in southern Quebec
- Coordinates: 45°27′N 72°05′W
- Country: Canada
- Province: Quebec
- Region: Estrie
- RCM: Le Val-Saint-François
- Constituted: March 6, 1935

Government
  - Mayor: Daniel Veilleux
  - Federal riding: Richmond—Arthabaska—des-Sources
  - Prov. riding: Richmond

Area
  - Total: 75.50 km^{2} (29.15 sq mi)
  - Land: 70.29 km^{2} (27.14 sq mi)

Population (2021)
  - Total: 4,594
  - Density: 65.4/km^{2} (169/sq mi)
  - Pop 2016–2021: ▲13.3%
  - Dwellings: 2,095
- Time zone: UTC−5 (EST)
  - Summer (DST): UTC−4 (EDT)
- Postal code(s): J0B 2P0
- Area code: 819
- Highways: R-222; R-249
- Website: www.sddb.ca

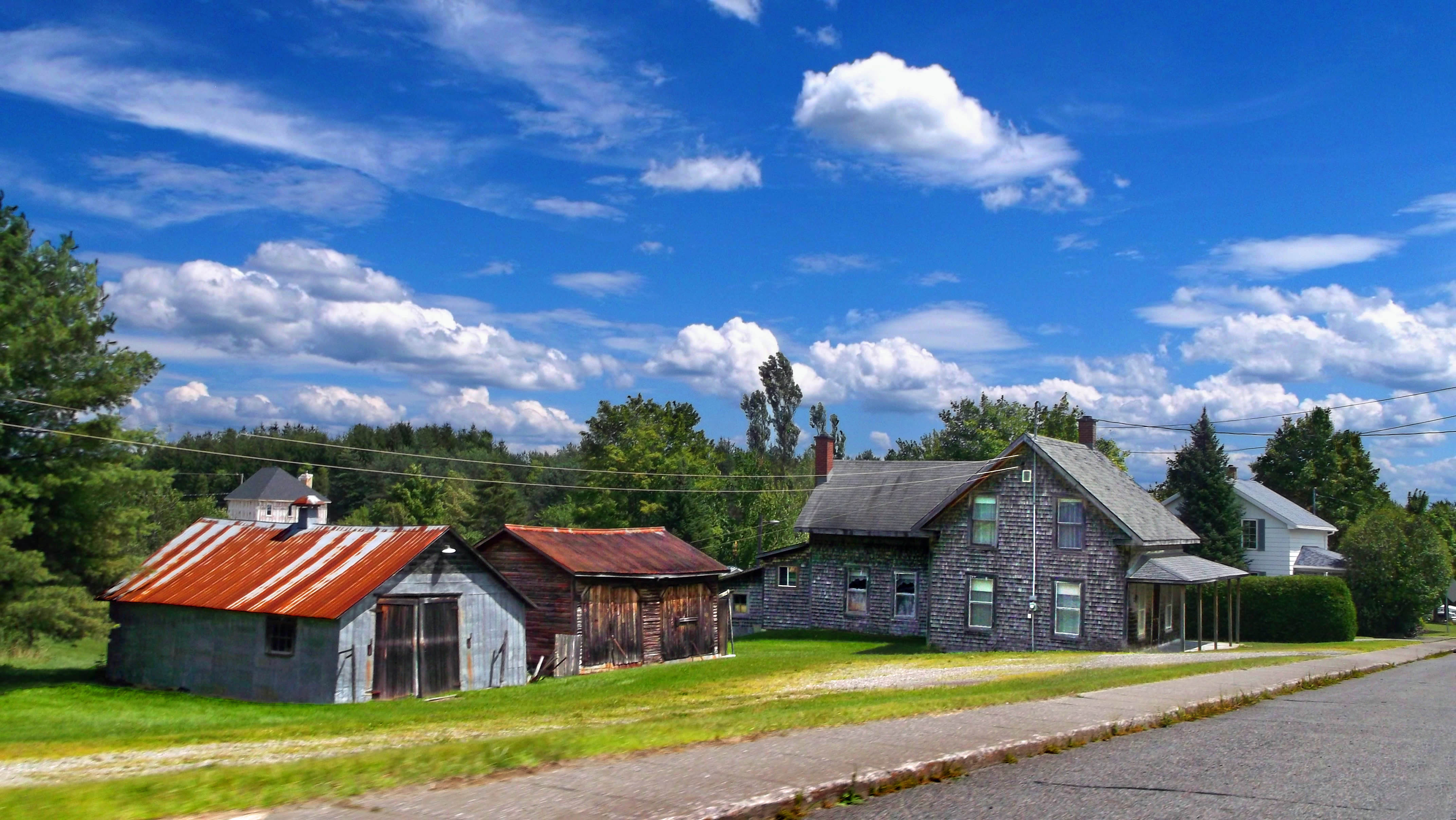
Old buildings in Saint-Denis-de-Brompton

Saint-Denis-de-Brompton is a municipality in the Canadian province of Quebec, part of the Regional county municipality of Le Val-Saint-François, within the larger administrative region of Estrie. It is located approximately 145 kilometres east of Montreal. The municipality is located in a densely wooded area on the shores of Lake Brompton.

== History ==
The region was still little frequented at the beginning of the 19th century when the township of Brompton was proclaimed in 1801 on the lands of the county of Buckinghamshire. The parish of Saint-Denis-de-Brompton was founded in this township in 1922. Its name pays homage to Father Joseph-Denis Bellemare, parish priest of Saint-François-Xavier-de-Brompton. On March 6, 1935, the parish municipality of Saint-Denis-de-Brompton was created by detachment of the municipalities of Brompton, Orford, Saint-François-Xavier-de-Brompton and Saint-Élie-d'Orford. The parish was canonically erected in 1940.

On November 17, 2012, Saint-Denis-de-Brompton changed status from parish municipality to municipality. Nowadays, Saint-Denis-de-Brompton is an important vacation resort in the region, in particular because of the lakes found there.

In 2021, following a referendum, the city put forward a project to install water and sewers in the Petit lac Brompton and Lac Desmarais sectors. This project includes, among other things, a loan of $31M.

== Demographics ==
=== Population ===
Historical Census Data – Saint-Denis-de-Brompton, Quebec

Year	Pop.	±%
1991	2,112	—
1996	2,289	+8.4%
2001	2,498	+9.1%

Year	Pop.	±%
2001A	2,574	+3.0%
2006	3,090	+20.0%
2011	3,402	+10.1%

Year	Pop.	±%
2016	4,054	+19.2%
2021	4,594	+13.3%

(A) adjusted figure due to boundary change.

Private dwellings occupied by usual residents: 1838 (total dwellings: 2095)

=== Language ===
All official government actions take place in French, the official language of Quebec. French is the primary language spoken in Saint-Denis-de-Brompton, though some people, especially those who deal often with tourists, are able to speak and understand English.

- Mother tongue:
- English as first language: 2.2%
- French as first language: 95.3%
- English and French as first language: 1.2%
- Other as first language: 1.1%

== Government ==
Saint-Denis-de-Brompton federal election results
Year	Liberal		Conservative		Bloc Québécois		New Democratic		Green	
2021	24%	611	27%	666	35%	886	7%	180	0%	0
2019	26%	625	18%	439	41%	986	7%	174	7%	158

Saint-Denis-de-Brompton provincial election results
Year	CAQ		Liberal		QC solidaire		Parti Québécois	
2018	39%	947	17%	409	21%	522	19%	473
2014	22%	475	34%	716	8%	177	33%	705

Saint-Denis-de-Brompton forms part of the federal electoral district of Richmond—Arthabaska—des-Sources and has been represented by Eric Lefebvre, a conservative MP, since 2025. Provincially, Saint-Denis-de-Brompton is part of the Richmond electoral district and is represented by Bernard Sévigny of the Parti Québécois since 2026.

The current mayor of Saint-Denis-de-Brompton is Denis Veilleux. The mayor and a five-member city council are the elected officials of the municipality.

== Education ==
Sherbrooke's Elementary School and High School (of the Eastern Townships School Board) serves English-speaking students in this community for both elementary and secondary levels.

== Tourism ==
The church of Saint-Denis-de-Brompton has stained glass windows made by a group of citizens assisted by a master glazier made from Claude Lafortune's paper church.

== See also ==
- List of municipalities in Quebec
