= Le Val-Saint-François Regional County Municipality =

Le Val-Saint-François
- Regional county municipality
- Location in province of Quebec.
- Coordinates: 45°34′N 72°01′W
- Country: Canada
- Province: Quebec
- Region: Estrie
- Effective: May 26, 1982
- County seat: Richmond

Government
  - Type: Prefecture
  - Prefect: Claude Boucher

Area
  - Total: 1,416.60 km^{2} (546.95 sq mi)
  - Land: 1,403.43 km^{2} (541.87 sq mi)

Population (2016)
  - Total: 30,686
  - Density: 21.9/km^{2} (57/sq mi)
  - Change 2011-2016: ▲3.5%
  - Dwellings: 14,359
- Time zone: UTC−5 (EST)
  - Summer (DST): UTC−4 (EDT)
- Area code: 819
- Website: www.val-saint-francois.qc.ca

Le Val-Saint-François (French pronunciation: [lə val sɛ̃ fʁɑ̃swa]) is a regional county municipality in the Estrie region of Quebec, Canada. The seat is Richmond.

== Subdivisions ==
There are 18 subdivisions within the RCM:

Cities & Towns (3)

- Richmond
- Valcourt
- Windsor

Municipalities (10)

- Bonsecours
- Maricourt
- Racine
- Saint-Claude
- Saint-Denis-de-Brompton
- Saint-François-Xavier-de-Brompton
- Sainte-Anne-de-la-Rochelle
- Stoke
- Ulverton
- Val-Joli

Townships (3)

- Cleveland
- Melbourne
- Valcourt

Villages (2)

- Kingsbury
- Lawrenceville

== Demographics ==
=== Population ===
Canada census – Le Val-Saint-François community profile

	2021	2016	2011
Population	31,551 (+2.8% from 2016)	30,686 (+3.5% from 2011)	29,654 (+2.2% from 2006)
Land area	1,401.56 km^{2} (541.15 sq mi)	1,403.43 km^{2} (541.87 sq mi)	1,403.96 km^{2} (542.07 sq mi)
Population density	22.5/km^{2} (58/sq mi)	21.9/km^{2} (57/sq mi)	21.1/km^{2} (55/sq mi)
Median age	45.2 (M: 44.8, F: 46.0)	44.8 (M: 44.1, F: 45.6)	44.1 (M: 43.3, F: 45.0)
Private dwellings	14,813 (total) 13,635 (occupied)	14,359 (total)	13,640 (total)
Median household income	$72,500	$60,791	$51,834

References: 2021 2016 2011

Historical Census Data - Le Val-Saint-François Regional County Municipality, Quebec

Year	Pop.	±%
1991	32,304	—
1996	33,422	+3.5%
1996A	28,143	−15.8%
2001	28,176	+0.1%

Year	Pop.	±%
2001A	28,383	+0.7%
2006	29,023	+2.3%
2011	29,654	+2.2%
2016	30,686	+3.5%

(A) adjusted figure due to boundary changes.

=== Language ===
Canada Census Mother Tongue - Le Val-Saint-François Regional County Municipality, Quebec
Census	Total	French			English			French & English			Other		
Year	Responses	Count	Trend	Pop %	Count	Trend	Pop %	Count	Trend	Pop %	Count	Trend	Pop %
2016	30,405	27,875	▲4.0%	91.68%	2,045	▼5.1%	6.73%	215	▼17.3%	0.71%	270	▲42.1%	0.89%
2011	29,405	26,800	▲3.6%	91.14%	2,155	▼10.2%	7.33%	260	▲1.9%	0.88%	190	▼26.9%	0.65%
2006	28,760	25,845	▲3.1%	89.86%	2,400	▲3.8%	8.34%	255	▲31.4%	0.89%	260	▲40.4%	0.90%
2001	27,695	25,055	▼16.2%	90.47%	2,310	▼10.8%	8.34%	175	▼32.7%	0.63%	155	▲19.4%	0.56%
1996	32,875	29,900	n/a	90.95%	2,590	n/a	7.88%	260	n/a	0.79%	125	n/a	0.38%

== Transportation ==
=== Access Routes ===
Highways and numbered routes that run through the municipality, including external routes that start or finish at the county border:

- Autoroutes
  - A-55
- Principal Highways
  - R-116
  - R-143
- Secondary Highways
  - R-216
  - R-220
  - R-222
  - R-243
  - R-249
- External Routes
  - None

== See also ==
- List of regional county municipalities and equivalent territories in Quebec
