= Racine, Quebec =

Racine
- Municipality
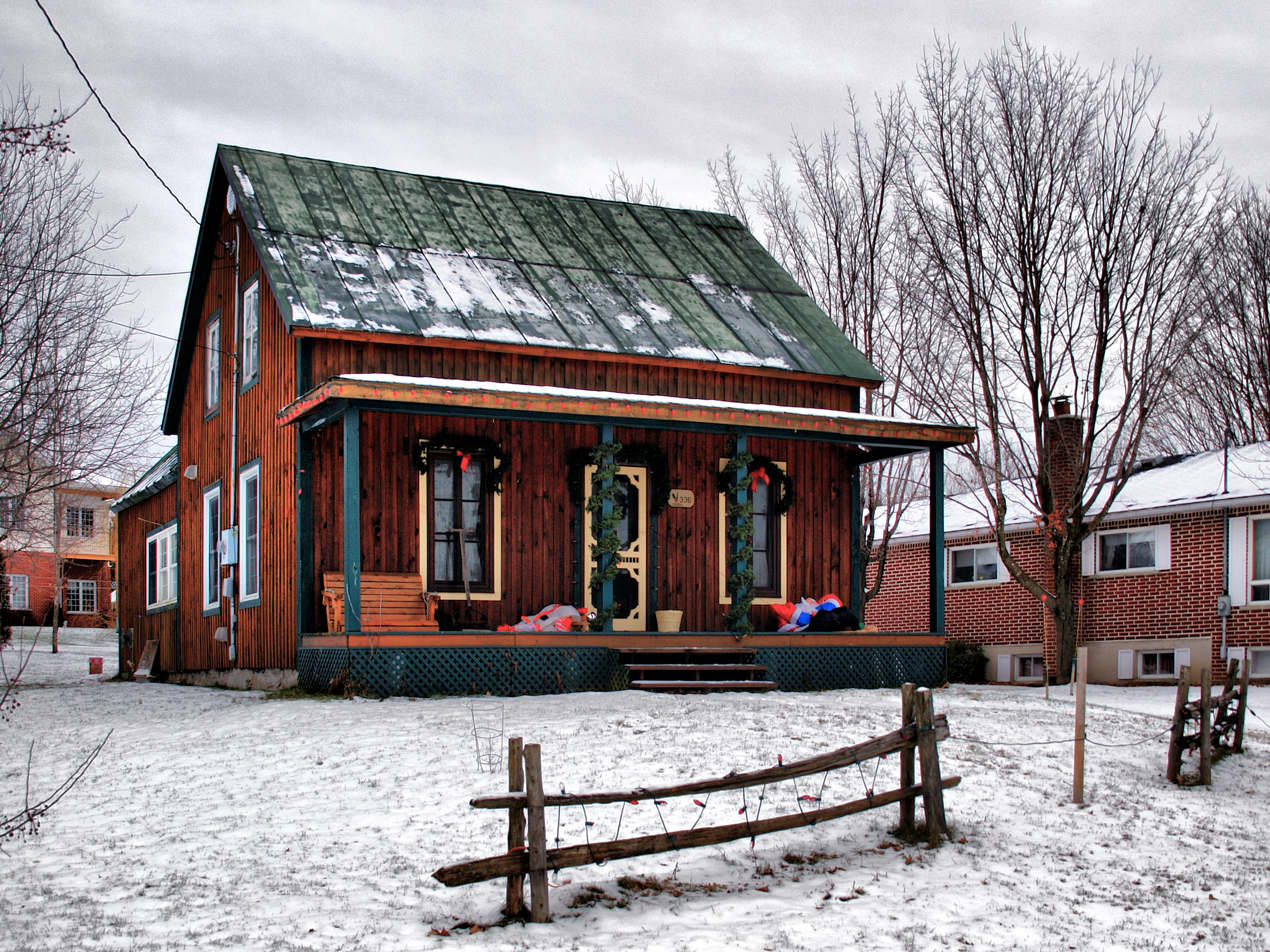

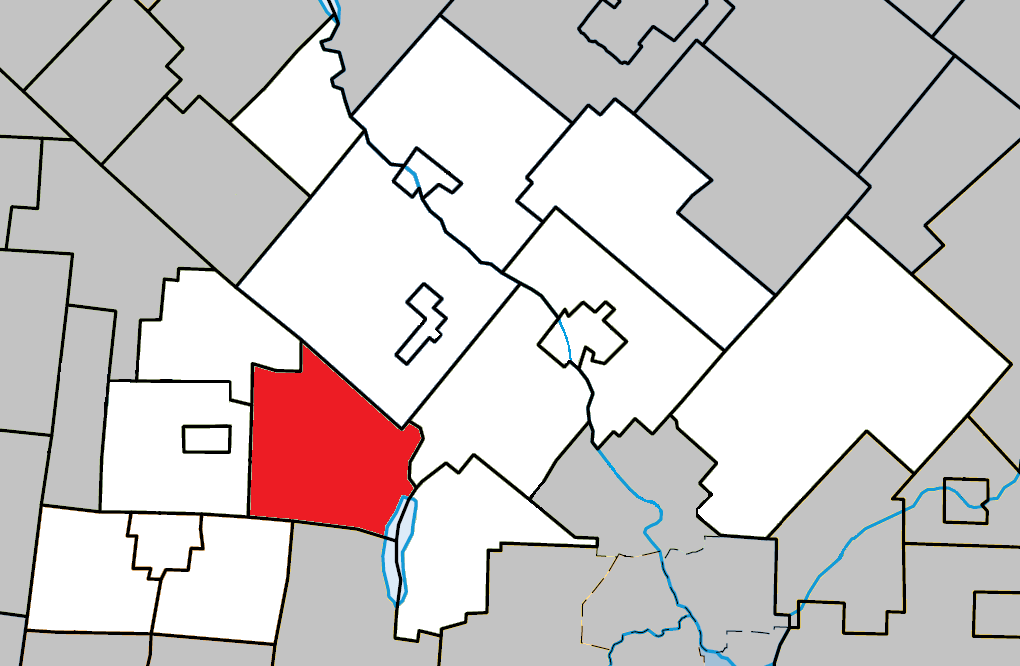
- Location within Le Val-Saint-François RCM.

- Location in southern Quebec.
- Coordinates: 45°30′N 72°15′W
- Country: Canada
- Province: Quebec
- Region: Estrie
- RCM: Le Val-Saint-François
- Constituted: February 15, 1995

Government
  - Mayor: Mario Côté
  - Federal riding: Shefford
  - Prov. riding: Daniel-Johnson

Area
  - Total: 107.60 km^{2} (41.54 sq mi)
  - Land: 105.85 km^{2} (40.87 sq mi)

Population (2011)
  - Total: 1,252
  - Density: 11.8/km^{2} (31/sq mi)
  - Pop 2006-2011: ▼1.0%
  - Dwellings: 663
- Time zone: UTC−5 (EST)
  - Summer (DST): UTC−4 (EDT)
- Postal code(s): J0E 1Y0
- Area codes: 450 and 579
- Highways: R-222; R-243
- Website: www.municipalite. racine.qc.ca

Racine (French pronunciation: [ʁasin]) is a municipality in Quebec, Canada. It is located in the Le Val-Saint-François Regional County Municipality, in the administrative region of Estrie. It is named after Antoine Racine, the first Bishop of Sherbrooke.

== Demographics ==
=== Population ===
Historical Census Data - Racine, Quebec

Year	Pop.	±%
1991	978	—
1996	1,036	+5.9%

Year	Pop.	±%
2001	1,153	+11.3%
2006	1,265	+9.7%

Year	Pop.	±%
2011	1,252	−1.0%

=== Language ===
Mother tongue (2011)

Language	Population	Pct (%)
French only	1,195	95.2%
English only	30	2.4%
English and French	10	0.8%
Non-official languages	15	1.2%
French and non-official language	5	0.4%

== See also ==
- List of municipalities in Quebec
