= Nicolet Southwest River =

River in Centre-du-Québec, Quebec (Canada)

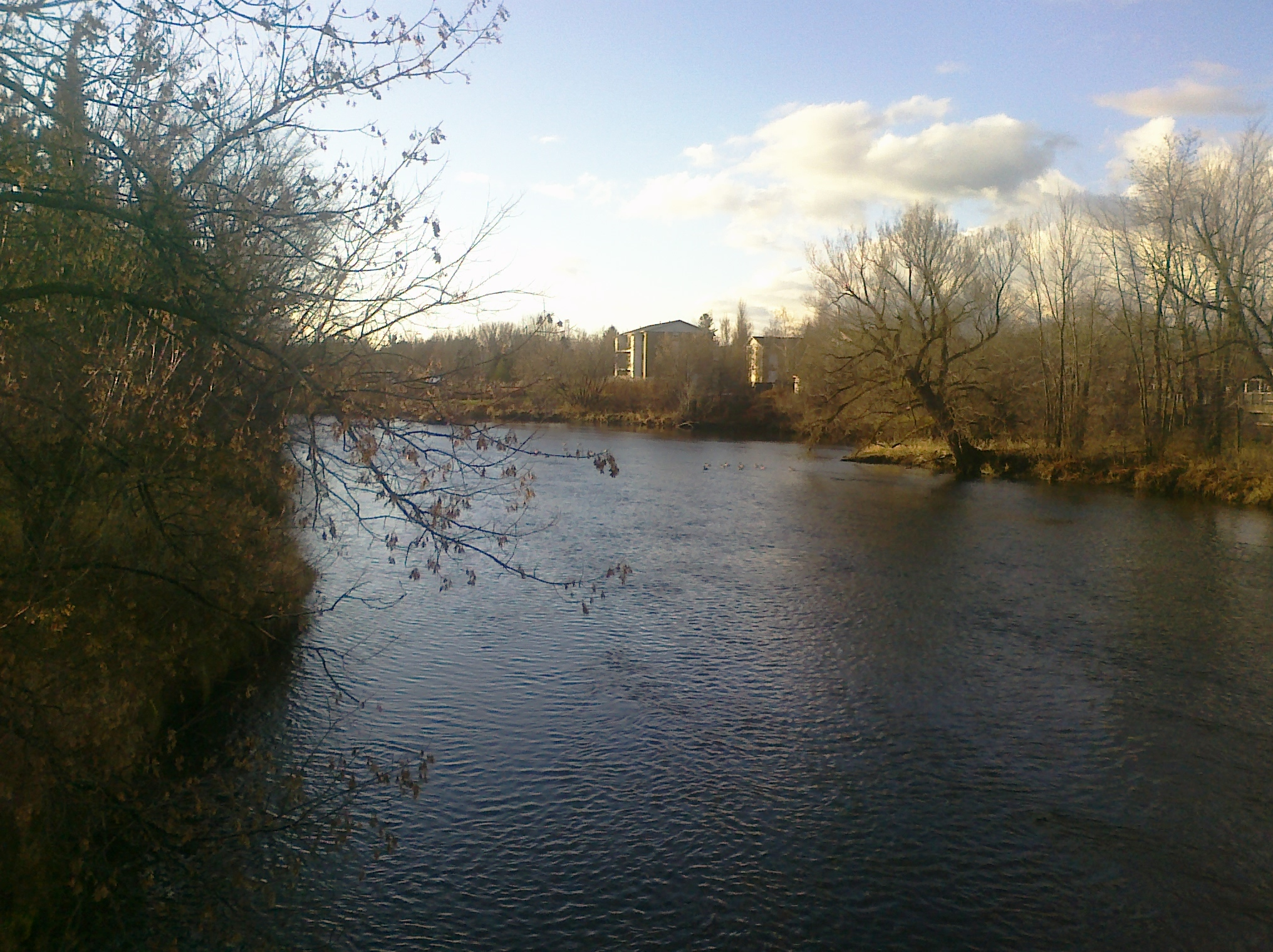
- Rivière Nicolet Sud-Ouest at Saint-Félix-de-Kingsey.

- Location within Quebec
- Native name: Rivière Nicolet Sud-Ouest (French)

Location
- Country: Canada
- Province: Quebec
- Region: Centre-du-Québec
- MRC: Arthabaska Regional County Municipality, Drummond Regional County Municipality, Nicolet-Yamaska Regional County Municipality
- Municipality: Saint-Samuel, Saint-Lucien, Notre-Dame-du-Bon-Conseil (paroisse), Notre-Dame-du-Bon-Conseil (village), Sainte-Brigitte-des-Saults, Sainte-Eulalie, Saint-Léonard-d'Aston, Grand-Saint-Esprit, La Visitation-de-Yamaska, Nicolet

Physical characteristics
- Source: Lac chez Piet
  - location: Dudswell
  - coordinates: 45.62667°N 71.70194°W
  - elevation: 322 m (1,056 ft)
- Mouth: Nicolet River
  - location: Nicolet
  - coordinates: 46.21667°N 72.60139°W
  - elevation: 6 m (20 ft)
- Length: 150 km (93 mi)

Basin features
- Progression: St. Lawrence River
- Tributaries
  - left: (upstream) cours d'eau Georges-Fleurent, La Grande Décharge, ruisseau Louis-Proulx, Saint-Zéphirin River, Sévère-René River, ruisseau Grady, ruisseau Boisvert, rivière des Saults, ruisseau du Rang Saint-Édouard, ruisseau Blais, cours d'eau Louis-Morin, rivière ?, ruisseau Onzième, ruisseau Lalancette, ruisseau Champagne, ruisseau Donat-Plante, ruisseau Landry-Lemire, ruisseau Gervais-Léveillée, La Coulée Naturelle, cours d'eau Fontaine, cours d'eau Bernier et Frères, ruisseau Abercrombie, ruisseau Francoeur, Landry River, cours d'eau Jacques, ruisseau Soucy.
  - right: (upstream) ruisseau Leblanc, ruisseau Jutras, Carmel River, ruisseau Eugène-Beauchemin, ruisseau Benoit-Girard, ruisseau Thibodeau-Béliveau, Lafont River, cours d'eau Bergeron, rivière à Pat, ruisseau Dubuc, ruisseau Roux, Nicolet Centre River, ruisseau l'Aulnière, Dion River, Saint-Camille Brook, Madeleine River.

The Nicolet Southwest River (in French: rivière Nicolet Sud-Ouest) is a tributary on the west bank of the Nicolet River. It empties into the municipality of Nicolet, in the Nicolet-Yamaska Regional County Municipality (MRC), in the administrative region of Centre-du-Québec, in Quebec, in Canada.

This river flows through the regional county municipalities (MRC):

Administrative region of Estrie:

- MRC of Le Haut-Saint-François Regional County Municipality: Dudswell;
- MRC des Les Sources Regional County Municipality: Danville;

Administrative region of Centre-du-Québec:

- MRC of Arthabaska Regional County Municipality: Saint-Félix-de-Kingsey, Quebec, Saint-Samuel;
- MRC of Drummond Regional County Municipality: Saint-Lucien, Notre-Dame-du-Bon-Conseil (parish), Notre-Dame-du-Bon-Conseil (village), Sainte-Brigitte-des-Saults;
- MRC of Nicolet-Yamaska Regional County Municipality: Sainte-Eulalie, Saint-Léonard-d'Aston, Grand-Saint-Esprit, La Visitation-de-Yamaska, Nicolet.

== Geography ==
The main neighboring hydrographic slopes of the Nicolet Sud-Ouest river are:

- North side: Nicolet River, Lake Saint-Pierre, St. Lawrence River;
- East side: Marguerite River, Nicolet River, Bécancour River;
- South side: Saint-Zéphirin River, rivière des Saults, Landry River, Danville River, Stoke River;
- West side: Saint-François River.

The "Nicolet Sud-Ouest River" has its source at "Lac chez Piet" located between two mountains in the territory of the municipality of Dudswell. This spring is located at 6.2 kilometres (3.9 mi) south of the village of Saint-Camille, at 1.2 kilometres (0.75 mi) east of the route 216, at 1.4 kilometres (0.87 mi) east of Lake Watopeka and 8.5 kilometres (5.3 mi) south-west of the center of the village of Saint-Adolphe-de-Dudswell.

Upper course of the river (segment of 58.8 kilometres (36.5 mi))

From "Lac chez Piet", the "Nicolet Sud-Ouest" river flows over:

- 2.1 kilometres (1.3 mi) northward to the limit of the municipality of Saint-Adolphe-de-Dudswell, that is also the limit of the Le Haut-Saint-François Regional County Municipality;
- 2.3 kilometres (1.4 mi) northwesterly in the municipality of Wotton, to route 216;
- 14.5 kilometres (9.0 mi) north-west to rue Gosselin, which it crosses at 1.9 kilometres (1.2 mi) southwest of the center of the village of Wotton;
- 12.6 kilometres (7.8 mi) northwesterly through Wotton, to the eastern shore of "Les Trois Lacs";
- 3.3 kilometres (2.1 mi) to the west, crossing Les Trois-Lacs (Les Sources), this body of water overlaps the Les Sources Regional County Municipality (Wotton) and that of Arthabaska Regional County Municipality (municipalities of Trois-Lacs and Saint-Rémi-de-Tingwick);
- 3.0 kilometres (1.9 mi) southwesterly, up to the limit of the municipality of Danville (Shipton sector);
- 8.7 kilometres (5.4 mi) west, to the railroad it crosses at 1.7 kilometres (1.1 mi) north of the center of the village of Danville;
- 2.9 kilometres (1.8 mi) west, forming a large loop north bypassing the village of Danville, to the confluence of the Landry River;
- 9.4 kilometres (5.8 mi) north-west, in the municipality of Danville (Shipton sector) to the bridge (route 255) southwest of the village of Saint-Félix-de-Kingsey.

Intermediate course of the river (segment of 39.3 kilometres (24.4 mi))

From the village of Kingsey Falls, the Nicolet Sud-Ouest river flows over:

- 9.8 kilometres (6.1 mi) towards the north-west, cutting on 0.4 kilometres (0.25 mi) the southern corner of the territory of Sainte-Élisabeth-de-Warwick, and crossing on 2.1 kilometres (1.3 mi) the territory of Sainte-Séraphine, up to the limit of the municipalities of Kingsey Falls and Saint-Lucien;
- 3.8 kilometres (2.4 mi) westward through Saint-Lucien, to the Domaine Parent bridge;
- 14.5 kilometres (9.0 mi) north-west, to the bridge located southwest of the village of Sainte-Clothilde-de-Horton; its course is then only 0.5 kilometres (0.31 mi) (on the southwest side) of the course of the Nicolet River;
- 5.1 kilometres (3.2 mi) westward in Sainte-Clothilde-de-Horton, to the limit of the MRC of Drummond Regional County Municipality;
- 3.9 kilometres (2.4 mi) north-west in Notre-Dame-du-Bon-Conseil (village), to the village bridge;
- 2.2 kilometres (1.4 mi) north-west to autoroute 20;

Lower course of the river (segment of 41.1 kilometres (25.5 mi))

From highway 20, the river flows over:

- 11.1 kilometres (6.9 mi) north-west, to the village bridge of Sainte-Brigitte-des-Saults;
- 8.9 kilometres (5.5 mi) northwesterly, to the limit of La Visitation-de-Yamaska;
- 6.5 kilometres (4.0 mi) northwesterly, to the confluence of the Sévère-René River;
- 2.3 kilometres (1.4 mi) northwesterly, to the confluence of the Saint-Zéphirin River;
- 12.3 kilometres (7.6 mi) north, up to its confluence.

The "South-West Nicolet River" empties on the west bank of the Nicolet River, at 3.7 kilometres (2.3 mi) upstream of Moras Island, at 200 metres (660 ft) downstream of the Île de l'Île bridge and 2.0 kilometres (1.2 mi) upstream of the Pierre-Roy bridge (route 132). The confluence of the "Nicolet Sud-Ouest river" is located 6.1 kilometres (3.8 mi) upstream from the confluence of the Nicolet River with the St. Lawrence River.

The main tributaries of the Nicolet Sud-Ouest river are:

- Saint-Zéphirin River
- Sévère-René River
- Rivière des Saults
- Landry River
- Carmel River
- Lafont River
- Rivière à Pat
- Nicolet Centre River
  - Nicolet North-East River
- Dion River
- Saint-Camille Brook

== Toponymy ==
The toponym "Rivière Nicolet Sud-Ouest" was formalized on December 5, 1968, at the Commission de toponymie du Québec.

== See also ==
- List of rivers of Quebec
