= Carmel River (Nicolet Southwest River) =

River in Estrie, Quebec (Canada)

- Location within Quebec
- Native name: Rivière Carmel (French)

Location
- Country: Canada
- Province: Quebec
- Region: Estrie
- MRC: Nicolet-Yamaska Regional County Municipality
- Municipality: Sainte-Perpétue, La Visitation-de-Yamaska, Sainte-Monique

Physical characteristics
- Source: Agriculture Streams
  - location: Saint-Léonard-d'Aston
  - coordinates: 46.08851°N 72.49341°W
  - elevation: 65 m (213 ft)
- Mouth: Nicolet Southwest River
  - location: Sainte-Perpétue
  - coordinates: 46.12729°N 72.6156°W
  - elevation: 45 m (148 ft)
- Discharge
  - minimum: Saint-Léonard-d'Aston

Basin features
- Progression: Nicolet Southwest River, Nicolet River, St. Lawrence River
- Tributaries
  - left: (upstream) embranchement de la rivière Carmel, ruisseau Aimé-Dionne, ruisseau Béliveau, ruisseau Rousseau
  - right: (upstream) ruisseau Alfred-Proulx, ruisseau Herman-Lambert, ruisseau Appleton-Houle

The Carmel River (in French: rivière Carmel) is a tributary on the northeast shore of the Nicolet Southwest River. It crosses the municipalities of Sainte-Perpétue, Sainte-Monique and La Visitation-de-Yamaska, in the Nicolet-Yamaska Regional County Municipality (MRC), in the administrative region of Centre-du-Québec, in Quebec, in Canada.

== Geography ==
The main neighboring hydrographic slopes of the Carmel River are:

- north side: Leblanc stream, Nicolet River;
- east side: Nicolet River;
- south side: Nicolet Southwest River, Lafont River;
- west side: Nicolet Southwest River.

The Carmel River has its source in an agricultural zone to the northeast and to the east of the village of Sainte-Perpétue, on the northeast side of rang Saint-Charles road.

This river flows east in an agricultural zone, crossing the chemin du rang Saint-Joseph (route 259) in Sainte-Perpétue. The river then cuts the southern part of the municipality of Sainte-Monique, then it flows in the municipality of La Visitation-de-Yamaska.

The Carmel River drains on the northeast shore of the Southwest Nicolet River at a bend in the river.

== Toponymy ==
The toponym "Rivière Carmel" was made official on August 8, 1977, at the Commission de toponymie du Québec.

== See also ==
- Lake Saint-Pierre
- List of rivers of Quebec
