= Rivière des Saults =

River in Centre-du-Québec, Quebec (Canada)

- Location within Quebec

Location
- Country: Canada
- Province: Quebec
- Region: Centre-du-Québec
- MRC: Drummond Regional County Municipality
- Municipality: Saint-Cyrille-de-Wendover, Sainte-Brigitte-des-Saults

Physical characteristics
- Source: Confluence of two brooks
  - location: Saint-Cyrille-de-Wendover
  - coordinates: 45.91383°N 72.38619°W
  - elevation: 100 m (330 ft)
- Mouth: Nicolet Southwest River
  - location: Sainte-Brigitte-des-Saults
  - coordinates: 46.02694°N 72.48833°W
  - elevation: 45 m (148 ft)
- Length: 24.1 km (15.0 mi)

Basin features
- Progression: Nicolet Southwest River, Nicolet River, St. Lawrence River
- Tributaries
  - left: (upstream) ruisseau des Généreux, ruisseau Poirier, La Branche Sud.
  - right: (upstream) ruisseau Therrien, ruisseau Saint-Pierre, ruisseau Delage, ruisseau non identifié.

The rivière des Saults (French pronunciation: [ʁivjɛʁ de so], "Saults river") is a tributary on the south bank of the Nicolet Southwest River. It empties into the municipality of Saint-Cyrille-de-Wendover, Notre-Dame-du-Bon-Conseil and Sainte-Brigitte-des-Saults, in the Drummond Regional County Municipality (MRC), in the administrative region of Centre-du-Québec, in Quebec, in Canada.

Except for the first 2.6 kilometres (1.6 mi) and near the mouth (village), the course of the river pass mainly in agricultural zone.

== Geography ==
The "rivière des Saults" has its source at the confluence of the north and south branches, in the Eastern part of the territory of the municipality of Saint-Cyrille-de-Wendover. This source is located at 2.0 kilometres (1.2 mi) north of Domaine-Despins of Saint-Lucien, at 6.1 kilometres (3.8 mi) east of the village center of Saint-Cyrille-de-Wendover and at 7.3 kilometres (4.5 mi) west of the Domaine-Lampron (on the eastern shore on an elbow of Nicolet Southwest River).

From its source (confluence of two brooks), the "rivière des Saults" flows on 24.1 kilometres (15.0 mi), with a drop of 55 metres (180 ft), according to these segments:

- 11.7 kilometres (7.3 mi) toward northwest in agricultural zone of Saint-Cyrille-de-Wendover, crossing the route 255, then curving to the west, passing under the bridge of the railway, crossing the route 122, up to autoroute 20;
- 12.4 kilometres (7.7 mi) northwesterly passing about 0.3 kilometres (0.19 mi) in the western part of municipality of Notre-Dame-du-Bon-Conseil, then entering in Sainte-Brigitte-des-Saults, up to its mouth.

The "rivière des Saults" empties on the south bank (in a river elbows) of the Nicolet Southwest River, in the village of Sainte-Brigitte-des-Saults.

== Toponymy ==
The toponym "rivière des Saults" was formalized on December 5, 1968, at the Commission de toponymie du Québec.

== See also ==
- List of rivers of Quebec
