= Saint-Zéphirin River =

River in Centre-du-Québec, Quebec, Canada

- Location within Quebec
- Native name: Rivière Saint-Zéphirin (French)

Location
- Country: Canada
- Province: Quebec
- Region: Centre-du-Québec
- MRC: Nicolet-Yamaska Regional County Municipality
- Municipality: Sainte-Brigitte-des-Saults, Saint-Zéphirin-de-Courval, La Visitation-de-Yamaska,

Physical characteristics
- Source: Agriculture streams
  - location: Sainte-Brigitte-des-Saults
  - coordinates: 46.02497°N 72.628691°W
  - elevation: 49 m (161 ft)
- Mouth: Nicolet Southwest River
  - location: La Visitation-de-Yamaska
  - coordinates: 46.12265°N 72.605763°W
  - elevation: 17 m (56 ft)
- Length: 19.6 km (12.2 mi)

Basin features
- Progression: Nicolet Southwest River, Nicolet River, St. Lawrence River
- Tributaries
  - left: (upstream) ruisseau Louis-Proulx, ruisseau Mercure, ruisseau Emmanuel-Lahaie.
  - right: (upstream) ruisseau Sainte-Geneviève, cours d'eau Tête-de-Rivière, ruisseau Boisvert-Lemire.

The Saint-Zéphirin River (in French: rivière Saint-Zéphirin) is a tributary on the west bank of the Nicolet Southwest River. It crosses the municipalities of Sainte-Brigitte-des-Saults, Saint-Zéphirin-de-Courval and La Visitation-de-Yamaska, in the Nicolet-Yamaska Regional County Municipality (MRC), in the administrative region of Centre-du-Québec, in Quebec, in Canada.

== Geography ==
The main neighboring hydrographic slopes of the Saint-Zéphirin river are:

- North side: Nicolet Southwest River, Nicolet River, Lake Saint-Pierre, St. Lawrence River;
- east side: Nicolet Southwest River, Nicolet River;
- south side: rivière des Frères, Landroche River, Colbert River, Saint-François River;
- west side: Lake Saint-Pierre, rivière des Frères, Landroche River, Colbert River.

The Saint-Zéphirin river takes its sources from agricultural streams, between the fifth rang road and the Saint-François River, in the municipality of Sainte-Brigitte-des-Saults.

From its head area, the Saint-Zéphirin river flows on 19.6 kilometres (12.2 mi) in the following segments:

- 7.9 kilometres (4.9 mi) north-west, first along the Chemin du Rang Saint-Pierre in Saint-Zéphirin-de-Courval, to the Chemin du Rang Saint-Pierre, which the river crosses at 200 metres (660 ft) east of the intersection of route de l'Église, in the village of Saint-Zéphirin-de-Courval;
- 3.2 kilometres (2.0 mi) north, up to the small road joining the chemin du rang Sainte-Geneviève and rang Saint-François in the municipality of Saint-Zéphirin-de-Courval;
- 8.5 kilometres (5.3 mi) north, passing east of the village of La Visitation-de-Yamaska where it intersects rue Principale (route 226) on the northeast side of the village, up to its confluence.

The Saint-Zéphirin river flows on the west bank of the Nicolet Southwest River, at 3.2 kilometres (2.0 mi) downstream from Provencher Island, 2.3 kilometres (1.4 mi) downstream from the confluence of the Sévère-René River and at 12.3 kilometres (7.6 mi) upstream from the confluence of the Nicolet Southwest River with the Nicolet River.

== Toponymy ==
The toponym "rivière Saint-Zéphirin" was made official on December 5, 1968, at the Commission de toponymie du Québec.

== See also ==
- List of rivers of Quebec
