= Nicolet (Province of Canada electoral district) =

Electoral district in former Province of Canada

Province of Canada electoral district

Defunct pre-Confederation electoral district
- Legislature: Legislative Assembly of the Province of Canada
- District created: 1841
- District abolished: 1867
- First contested: 1841
- Last contested: 1863

Nicolet was an electoral district of the Legislative Assembly of the Parliament of the Province of Canada, in Canada East, centred on the town of Nicolet. It was created in 1841 and was based on the previous electoral district of the same name for the Legislative Assembly of Lower Canada. It was represented by one member in the Legislative Assembly.

In 1853, the provincial Parliament redrew the electoral map. The boundaries for Nicolet were altered to some extent in the new map, which came into force for the 1854 general elections.

The electoral district was abolished in 1867, upon the creation of Canada and the province of Quebec.

== Boundaries ==
The electoral district of Nicolet was on the south shore of the Saint Lawrence River, centred on the town of Nicolet (now in the Nicolet-Yamaska Regional County Municipality, Centre-du-Québec region).

=== 1841 to 1854 ===
The Union Act, 1840, passed by the British Parliament, merged the two provinces of Lower Canada and Upper Canada into the Province of Canada, with a single Parliament. The separate parliaments of Lower Canada and Upper Canada were abolished. The Union Act provided that the pre-existing electoral boundaries of Lower Canada and Upper Canada would continue to be used in the new Parliament, unless altered by the Union Act itself.

The Nicolet electoral district of Lower Canada was not altered by the Act, and therefore continued with the same boundaries which had been set by a statute of Lower Canada in 1829:

The County of Nicolet shall be bounded on the east by the County of Lotbinière, on the west by the seigniorial line between the seigniory of Nicolet and the seigniories La Baie du Febvre and Courval, towards the north by the river St. Lawrence, and on the south by the river Becancour, being the boundary of the township of Blandford and Maddington, by the rear line of the seigniory of Becancour, on the west of the said river by the division lines between the township of Aston and the augmentation thereof, and the seigniory of Godefroy, Roquetaillade and the augmentation of Nicolet, and lastly by the rear line of the augmentation of Nicolet; and shall comprehend the whole tract of country included within the said limits.

=== 1854 to 1867 ===
In 1853, the Parliament of the Province of Canada passed a new electoral map. The boundaries of Nicolet were altered to some extent by the new map, which came into force in the general elections of 1854:

The County of Nicolet shall be bounded on the north-east by the limits of the Districts of Quebec and Three-Rivers, up to the distance of two miles into the Township of Blandford, thence on the south-east by a perpendicular line drawn across the Township of Blandford, and thence by the south-western line thereof to the limits of the Seigniories, and by the limits between the Seigniories and the Townships as far as the north-eastern line of the Parish of Saint Célestin, comprising in the said County of Nicolet all that part of the said Parish of Saint Célestin which is in the Township of Aston and the augmentation and the Gore thereof, thence by the south-eastern line of the augmentation of the Seigniory of Nicolet, on the south-west by the south-western limits of the Seigniory of Nicolet and augmentation, on the north-west by the River Saint Lawrence; the said County so bounded comprising the Parishes of Saint Pierre, Gentilly, Sainte Gertrude, (excepting the Township of Maddington,) Bécancour, Saint Grégoire, Nicolet, Sainte Monique, part of the Township of Blandford and the Parish of Saint Célestin.

== Members of the Legislative Assembly (1841–1867) ==
Nicolet was a single-member constituency in the Legislative Assembly.

The following were the members of the Legislative Assembly from Nicolet. The party affiliations are based on the biographies of individual members given by the National Assembly of Quebec, as well as votes in the Legislative Assembly. "Party" was a fluid concept, especially during the early years of the Province of Canada.

Parliament	Members	Years in Office	Party
1st Parliament; 1841–1844	Augustin-Norbert Morin (Note: Resigned seat to take appointment to the district court of Rimouski, January 7, 1842: Côté, Appointments and Elections, p. 59, note (26).)	1841–1842	Anti-unionist; French-Canadian Group
1st Parliament; 1841–1844	Louis-Michel Viger (Note: Elected in by-election, February 15, 1842: Côté,Appointments and Elections, p. 59, note (27).)	1842–1844	French-Canadian Group
2nd Parliament; 1844–1847	Antoine-Prosper Méthot	1844–1847	French-Canadian Group
3rd Parliament; 1848–1851	Thomas Fortier	1848–1857	French-Canadian Group
4th Parliament; 1851–1854	Thomas Fortier	1848–1857	Ministerialist
5th Parliament; 1854–1857	Thomas Fortier	1848–1857	Bleu
6th Parliament; 1858–1861	Joseph Gaudet	1858–1867	Bleu
7th Parliament; 1861–1863	Joseph Gaudet	1858–1867	Bleu
8th Parliament; 1863–1867	Joseph Gaudet	1858–1867	Confederation; Bleu

== See also ==
- List of elections in the Province of Canada

== Abolition ==
The district was abolished on July 1, 1867, when the British North America Act, 1867 came into force, creating Canada and splitting the Province of Canada into Quebec and Ontario. It was succeeded by electoral districts of the same name and boundaries in the House of Commons of Canada and the Legislative Assembly of Quebec.
