= Sévère-René River =

River in Centre-du-Québec, Quebec (Canada)

Location
- Country: Canada
- Province: Quebec
- Region: Estrie
- MRC: Nicolet-Yamaska Regional County Municipality
- Municipality: Saint-Zéphirin-de-Courval, La Visitation-de-Yamaska

Physical characteristics
- Source: Agricultural streams
  - location: Saint-Zéphirin-de-Courval
  - coordinates: 45.037427°N 72.6431°W
  - elevation: 40 m (130 ft)
- Mouth: Nicolet Southwest River
  - location: La Visitation-de-Yamaska
  - coordinates: 46.11306°N 72.58417°W
  - elevation: 18 m (59 ft)
- Length: 4.0 km (2.5 mi)

Basin features
- River system: Nicolet Southwest River, Nicolet River, St. Lawrence River
- Tributaries
  - left: (upstream) Décharge des Ving-Quatre, Décharge des Dix, cours d'eau Dionne-Leclerc
  - right: (upstream) Décharge Houle-Lemaire, cours d'eau Leclerc

The Sévère-René River is a tributary on the west bank of the Nicolet Southwest River. It crosses the municipalities of Saint-Zéphirin-de-Courval and La Visitation-de-Yamaska, in the Nicolet-Yamaska Regional County Municipality (MRC), in the administrative region from Centre-du-Québec, to Quebec, to Canada.

== Geography ==
The main neighboring hydrographic slopes of the Sévère-René river are:

- North side: South-West Nicolet River, Nicolet River, Lake Saint-Pierre, St. Lawrence River;
- East side: Nicolet Southwest River, Grady stream;
- South side: Saint-Zéphirin River, Saint-François River;
- West side: Tête de Rivière stream, Saint-Zéphirin River.

The Sévère-René river takes its sources from agricultural streams, located in an area northwest of rang Saint-Alexandre road and northeast of rang Saint-François road, in the municipality of Saint-Zéphirin-de-Courval. Its source begins at the confluence of the Rousseau-Leclerc and Dionne-Leclerc rivers.

From its head area, the Sévère-René river flows north for four km, first in Saint-Zéphirin-de-Courval, then in La Visitation-de-Yamaska. Along its course, it collects water from the Houle-Lemaire landfill and crosses the road to rang Sainte-Geneviève and the road to rang Chatillon.

The Sévère-René river flows on the west bank of the Nicolet Southwest River, at 0.9 kilometres (0.56 mi) downstream from Provencher Island, 2.3 kilometres (1.4 mi) upstream from the confluence of the Saint-Zéphirin River and at 14.6 kilometres (9.1 mi) upstream from the confluence of the Nicolet Southwest River with the Nicolet River.

== Toponymy ==
The toponym "Rivière Sévère-René" was made official on December 5, 1968, at the Commission de toponymie du Québec.

== See also ==
- List of rivers of Quebec
