= Lafont River =

River in Estrie, Quebec (Canada)

- Native name: Rivière Lafont (French)

Location
- Country: Canada
- Province: Quebec
- Region: Estrie
- MRC: Nicolet-Yamaska Regional County Municipality
- Municipality: Saint-Léonard-d'Aston and Sainte-Perpétue (Nicolet-Yamaska)

Physical characteristics
- Source: Agriculture Streams
  - location: Saint-Léonard-d'Aston
  - coordinates: 46.066398°N 72.431388°W
  - elevation: 80 m (260 ft)
- Mouth: Nicolet Southwest River
  - location: Sainte-Perpétue (Nicolet-Yamaska)
  - coordinates: 46.04639°N 72.41972°W
  - elevation: 62 m (203 ft)
- Length: 7.6 km (4.7 mi)
- Discharge
  - minimum: Saint-Léonard-d'Aston

Basin features
- Progression: Nicolet Southwest River, Nicolet River, St. Lawrence River
- Tributaries
  - left: ruisseau Laplante

The Lafont River (in French: rivière Lafont) is a tributary on the northeast shore of the Nicolet Southwest River. It crosses the municipalities of Saint-Léonard-d'Aston and Sainte-Perpétue, in the Nicolet-Yamaska Regional County Municipality (MRC), in the administrative region of Centre-du-Québec, in Quebec, in Canada.

== Geography ==
The main neighboring hydrographic slopes of the Lafont River are:

- north side: Nicolet River;
- east side: Nicolet River, Quatorzième Rang de Wendover stream;
- south side: Nicolet Southwest River;
- west side: Nicolet Southwest River, Louis-Gilbert stream.

The Lafont River takes its source in an agricultural zone near the railway, at the limit of the municipalities of Saint-Léonard-d'Aston and Sainte-Perpétue. This area is located on the southwest shore of the Nicolet River, southwest of the village of Saint-Léonard-d'Aston and east of the village of Sainte-Perpétue.

The Lafont River flows in an agricultural zone on:

- 4.2 kilometres (2.6 mi) southward, in Saint-Léonard-d'Aston, to the municipal limit of Sainte-Perpétue;
- 3.4 kilometres (2.1 mi) southwesterly in Sainte-Perpétue to its confluence.

The Lafont River empties on the north bank of the Nicolet Southwest River at 4.7 kilometres (2.9 mi) upstream of the bridge in the village of Sainte-Brigitte-des-Saults and at 2.5 kilometres (1.6 mi) downstream of the Mitchell hamlet railway bridge.

== Toponymy ==
The term "Lafond" or "Lafont" turns out to be a family name of French origin.

The toponym "Rivière Lafont" was made official on August 17, 1978, at the Commission de toponymie du Québec.

== See also ==
- Lake Saint-Pierre
- List of rivers of Quebec
