= Quebec Route 122 =

Highway in Quebec, Canada

Route 122

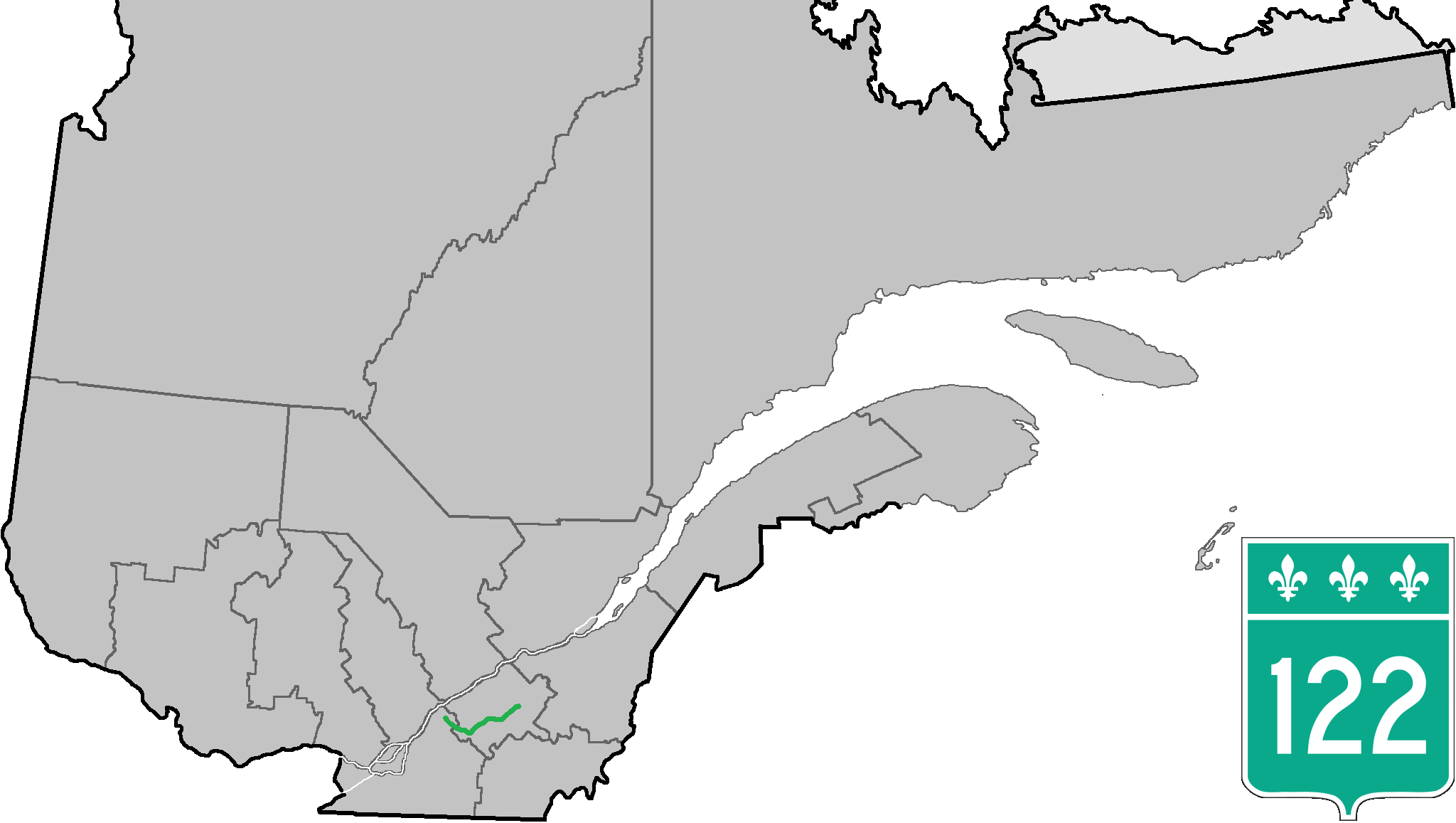

Route information
- Maintained by Transports Québec
- Length: 95.3 km (59.2 mi)

Major junctions
- West end: R-132 in Yamaska
- R-224 in Saint-Guillaume; A-20 (TCH) / R-239 in Saint-Germain-de-Grantham; A-55 / R-143 in Drummondville; R-255 in Saint-Cyrille-de-Wendover; R-259 in Notre-Dame-du-Bon-Conseil; A-955 in Saint-Albert; R-161 / R-162 in Victoriaville
- East end: R-116 in Victoriaville

Location
- Country: Canada
- Province: Quebec

Highway system
- Quebec provincial highways; Autoroutes; List; Former
← R-117	→ R-125

Route 122 is an east/west highway on the south shore of the Saint Lawrence River in Quebec, Canada. Its western terminus is at the junction of Route 132 in Yamaska and the eastern terminus is in Victoriaville at the junction of Route 116. The highway acts mainly as the main link between Drummondville and Sorel-Tracy, and somewhat as a major link between Victoriaville and Drummondville.

== Municipalities along Route 122 ==
- Yamaska
- Saint-Gérard-Majella
- Saint-David
- Saint-Guillaume
- Saint-Bonaventure
- Saint-Edmond-de-Grantham
- Saint-Germain-de-Grantham
- Drummondville, Saint-Charles-de-Drummond
- Saint-Cyrille-de-Wendover
- Notre-Dame-du-Bon-Conseil (Parish)
- Notre-Dame-du-Bon-Conseil (Village)
- Sainte-Clotilde-de-Horton
- Saint-Albert
- Victoriaville

== Major intersections ==
RCM or ET	Municipality	Km	Junction	Notes
Western terminus of Route 122
Pierre-De Saurel	Yamaska	0.0	R-132	132 west: to Saint-Robert; 132 east: to Saint-François-du-Lac
Drummond	Saint-Guillaume	15.3; 15.4	R-224	224 east: to Saint-Bonaventure; 224 west: to Saint-Guillaume
Drummond	Saint-Germain-de-Grantham	30.4; 30.5	A-20 (TCH) (exit 170)	20 west: to Saint-Eugène; 20 east: to Drummondville
Drummond	Saint-Germain-de-Grantham	32.2	R-239 (South end)	239 north: to Saint-Eugène
Drummond	Drummondville	36.0; 36.4	A-55 (exit 125)	55 south: to Saint-Nicéphore (Drummondville); 55 north: to A-20 (TCH) (exit 173)
Drummond	Drummondville	39.7; 39.9	R-143 (overlap 0.2 km)	143 north: to Saint-Majorique-de-Grantham; 143 south: to Saint-Nicéphore (Drummondville)
Drummond	Saint-Cyrille-de-Wendover	48.0; 50.9	R-255 (overlap 2.9 km)	255 north: to Saint-Joachim-de-Courval (Drummondville); 255 south: to Saint-Lucien
Drummond	Notre-Dame-du-Bon-Conseil (village)	58.9	R-259 (south end)	259 north: to Sainte-Perpétue
Arthabaska	Saint-Albert	79.6	A-955 (south end)	955 north: to Saint-Samuel
Arthabaska	Victoriaville	87.8	R-161 (overlap 3.5 km)	161 north: to Saint-Valère
Arthabaska	Victoriaville	90.7	R-162 (south end)	162 north: to Saint-Rosaire
Arthabaska	Victoriaville	91.3	R-161 (overlap 3.5 km)	161 south: to Saint-Christophe-d'Arthabaska
Arthabaska	Victoriaville	95.3	R-116	116 west: to Saint-Christophe-d'Arthabaska; 116 east: to Princeville
Eastern terminus of Route 122

== See also ==
- List of Quebec provincial highways
