= Pat River =

River in Estrie, Quebec (Canada)

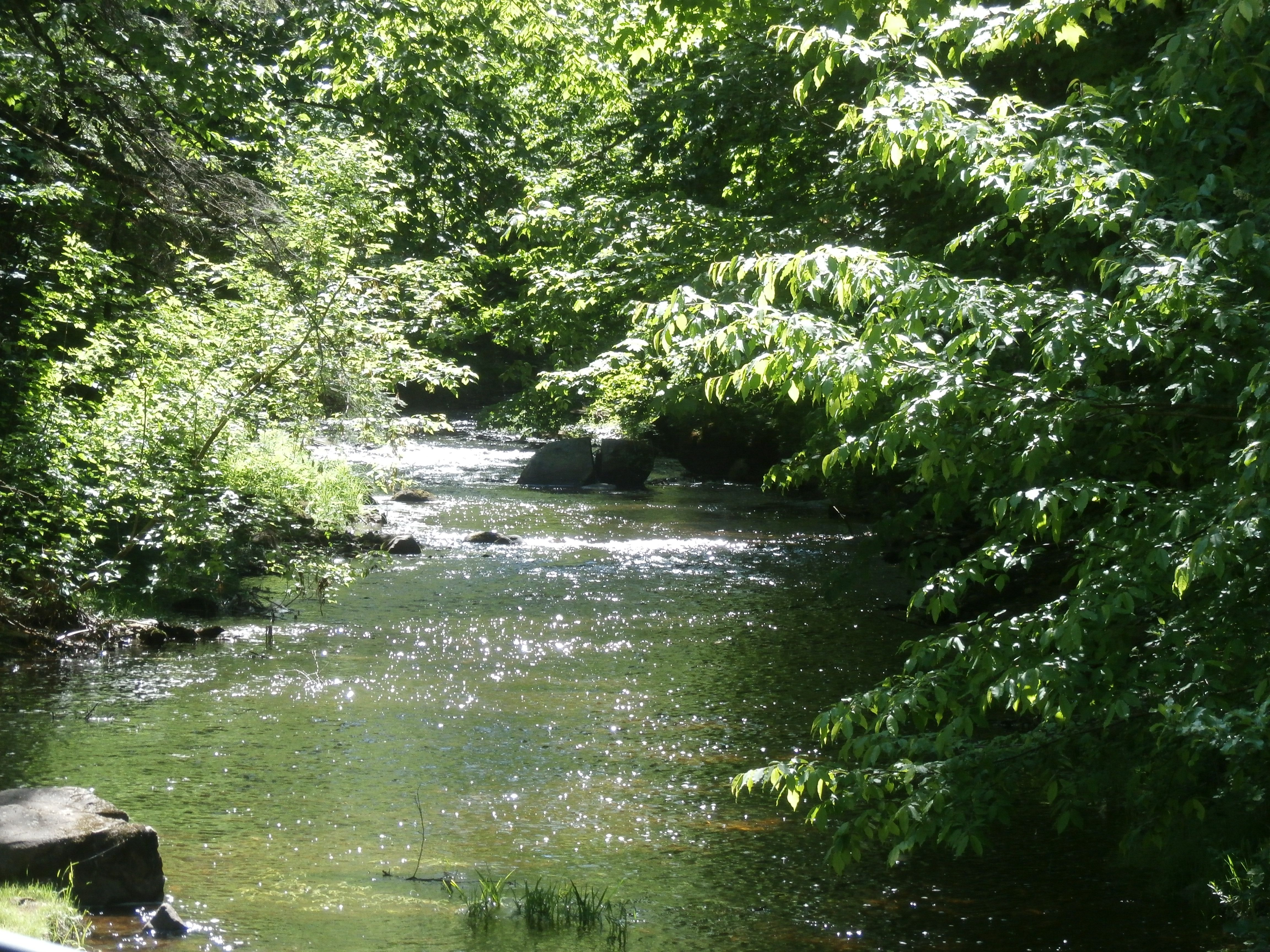
- Weedon steam downstream from Vaseux Lake.
- Native name: Rivière à Pat (French)

Location
- Country: Canada
- Province: Quebec
- Region: Estrie
- MRC: Le Haut-Saint-François Regional County Municipality
- Municipality: Sainte-Élizabeth-de-Warwick, Sainte-Séraphine and Sainte-Clotilde-de-Horton

Physical characteristics
- Source: Agricultural streams
  - location: Sainte-Élizabeth-de-Warwick
  - coordinates: 45.876523°N 72.112423°W
  - elevation: 118 m (387 ft)
- Mouth: Nicolet Southwest River
  - location: Sainte-Clotilde-de-Horton
  - coordinates: 45.96444°N 72.23528°W
  - elevation: 83 m (272 ft)
- Length: 18.4 km (11.4 mi)

Basin features
- Progression: Nicolet Southwest River, Nicolet River, St. Lawrence River
- Tributaries
  - left: (upstream) ruisseau Lampron-Raiche.
  - right: (upstream) ruisseau Lainesse, ruisseau Laroche, ruisseau Fafard,

The Pat River (Rivière à Pat) is a tributary on the east bank of the Nicolet Southwest River. It crosses the municipalities of Sainte-Élizabeth-de-Warwick, Sainte-Séraphine and Sainte-Clotilde-de-Horton in the Arthabaska Regional County Municipality (MRC), in the administrative region of Estrie, in Quebec, in Canada.

== Geography ==
The main neighboring hydrographic slopes of the Pat river are:

- north side: Nicolet Southwest River, Nicolet River;
- east side: Nicolet River, rivière des Rosiers;
- south side: Léon-Gélinas stream, Dubuc stream, Nicolet Southwest River;
- west side: Nicolet Southwest River.

The Rivière à Pat originates from various streams in the municipality of Sainte-Élizabeth-de-Warwick, very close to the limit of the municipality of Kingsey Falls.

From its source, Pat's River flows on 18.4 kilometres (11.4 mi) in the following segments:

- 3.7 kilometres (2.3 mi) north-west, in the municipality of Sainte-Élizabeth-de-Warwick, to the intermunicipal limit of Sainte-Séraphine;
- 4.8 kilometres (3.0 mi) north, passing 2.2 kilometres (1.4 mi) east of the village of Sainte-Séraphine, up to the road to seventh rank;
- 4.8 kilometres (3.0 mi) north-west, up to the municipal limit of Sainte-Clotilde-de-Horton;
- 5.1 kilometres (3.2 mi) westward to its confluence, of which 2.8 kilometres (1.7 mi) in Sainte-Séraphine, 2.0 kilometres (1.2 mi) in Sainte-Clotilde-de-Horton, 0.6 kilometres (0.37 mi) in Sainte-Séraphine and 1.7 kilometres (1.1 mi) in Sainte-Clotilde-de-Horton.

The Rivière à Pat drains on the east bank of the Nicolet Southwest River. Its confluence is located 1.6 kilometres (0.99 mi) upstream from Île Lemire and upstream from the village of Sainte-Clotilde-de-Horton.

== Toponymy ==
The toponym "Rivière à Pat" was formalized on September 5, 1985, at the Commission de toponymie du Québec.

== See also ==
- Lake Saint-Pierre
- List of rivers of Quebec
