= Notre-Dame-du-Bon-Conseil, Quebec (village) =

Notre-Dame-du-Bon-Conseil
- Village municipality
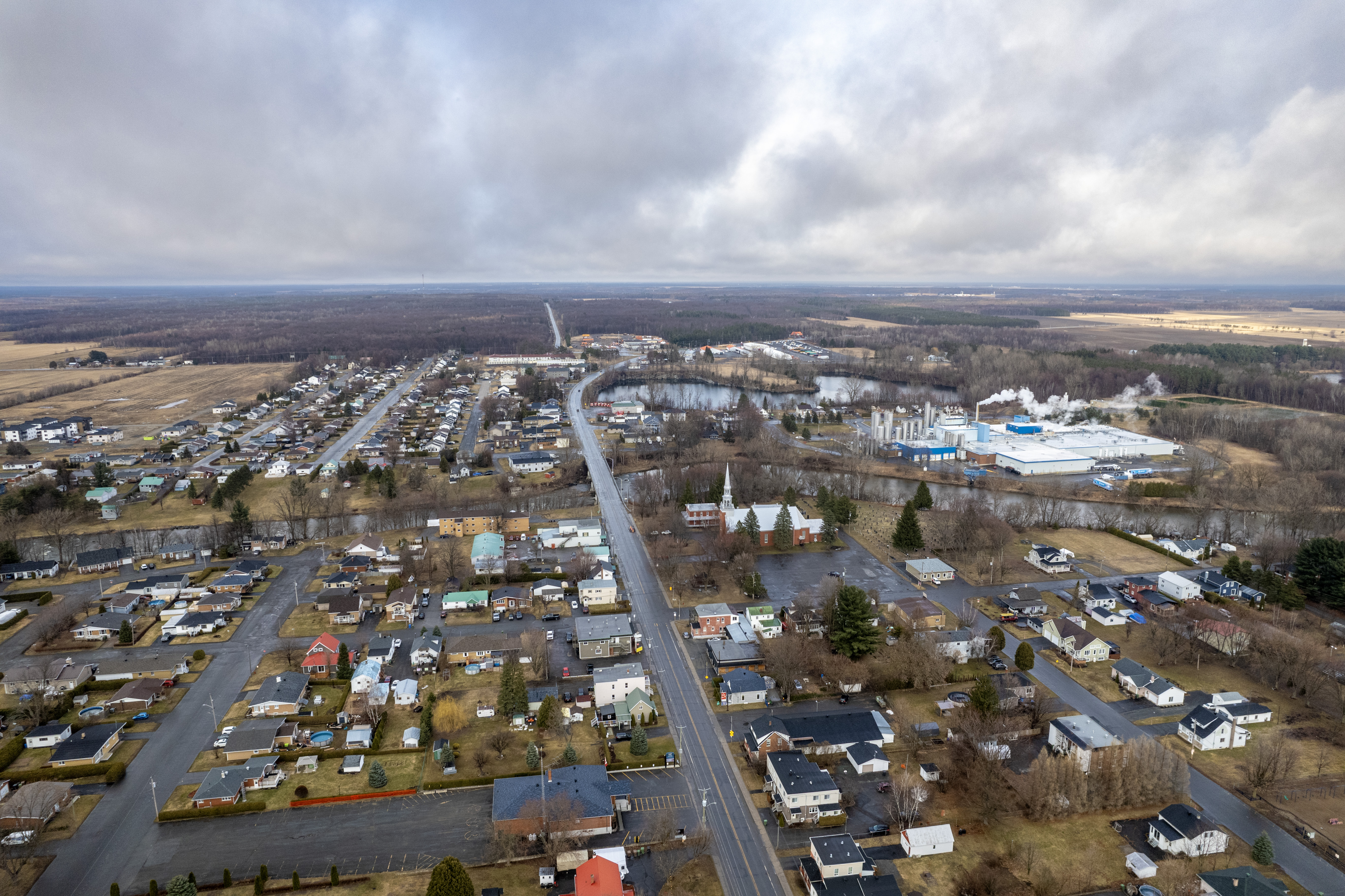
- Aerial view of Notre-Dame-du-Bon-Conseil

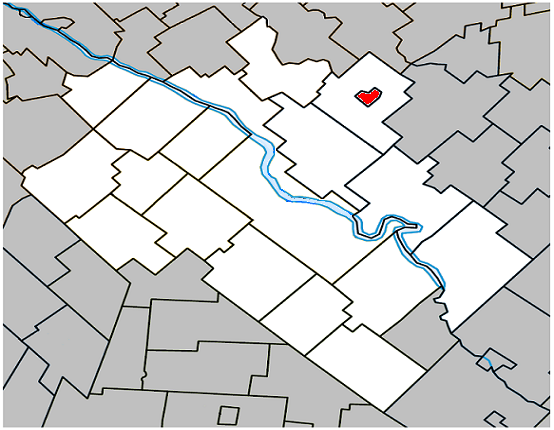
- Location within Drummond RCM.

- Location in southern Quebec.
- Coordinates: 46°00′N 72°21′W
- Country: Canada
- Province: Quebec
- Region: Centre-du-Québec
- RCM: Drummond
- Constituted: January 1, 1957

Government
  - Mayor: Sylvain Jutras
  - Federal riding: Drummond
  - Prov. riding: Drummond–Bois-Francs

Area
  - Total: 4.40 km^{2} (1.70 sq mi)
  - Land: 4.20 km^{2} (1.62 sq mi)

Population (2016)
  - Total: 1,557
  - Density: 370.4/km^{2} (959/sq mi)
  - Pop 2011-2016: ▲10.9%
  - Dwellings: 675
- Time zone: UTC−5 (EST)
  - Summer (DST): UTC−4 (EDT)
- Postal code(s): J0C 1A0
- Area code: 819
- Highways: R-122; R-259
- Website: www.notre-dame-du- bon-conseil-village.qc.ca

Notre-Dame-du-Bon-Conseil (French pronunciation: [nɔtʁə dam dy bɔ̃ kɔ̃sɛj]) is a village municipality in Drummond Regional County Municipality in the Centre-du-Quebec region of Quebec. The population as of the Canada 2016 Census was 1,557. The community is completely encircled by the parish municipality of Notre-Dame-du-Bon-Conseil.

It is accessible via exit 196 to Highway 20. It is also served by Route 122, which connects Drummondville to Victoriaville

== Toponymy ==
The name of the city comes from an appearance of Mary in the town of Genazzano in 1467. In their 2008 album, La Ligne Orange, Mes Aieux named a song after the village.

== History ==
The history of the municipality of Notre-Dame-du-Bon-Conseil is closely related to the precursor hamlets Carmel, Blake and Mitchell. These experienced prosperity in the second half of the nineteenth century, thanks to sawmills, a brick and railroad. Yet by the end of the last century, they were already on the decline. The canonical incorporation October 21, 1895 and February 7, 1896 calendar of Notre-Dame-du-Bon-Conseil, as well as the inauguration of the first church in 1897 sounded the death knell of the three original cantons which are then incorporated into one. On 15 January 1898 the parish municipality is created.

The first settlers on the site of what became the parish of Notre-Dame-du-Bon-Conseil arrived in 1879. This new settlement grew rapidly through agriculture, the timber industry and operation of gravel pits, which were very numerous in the region.

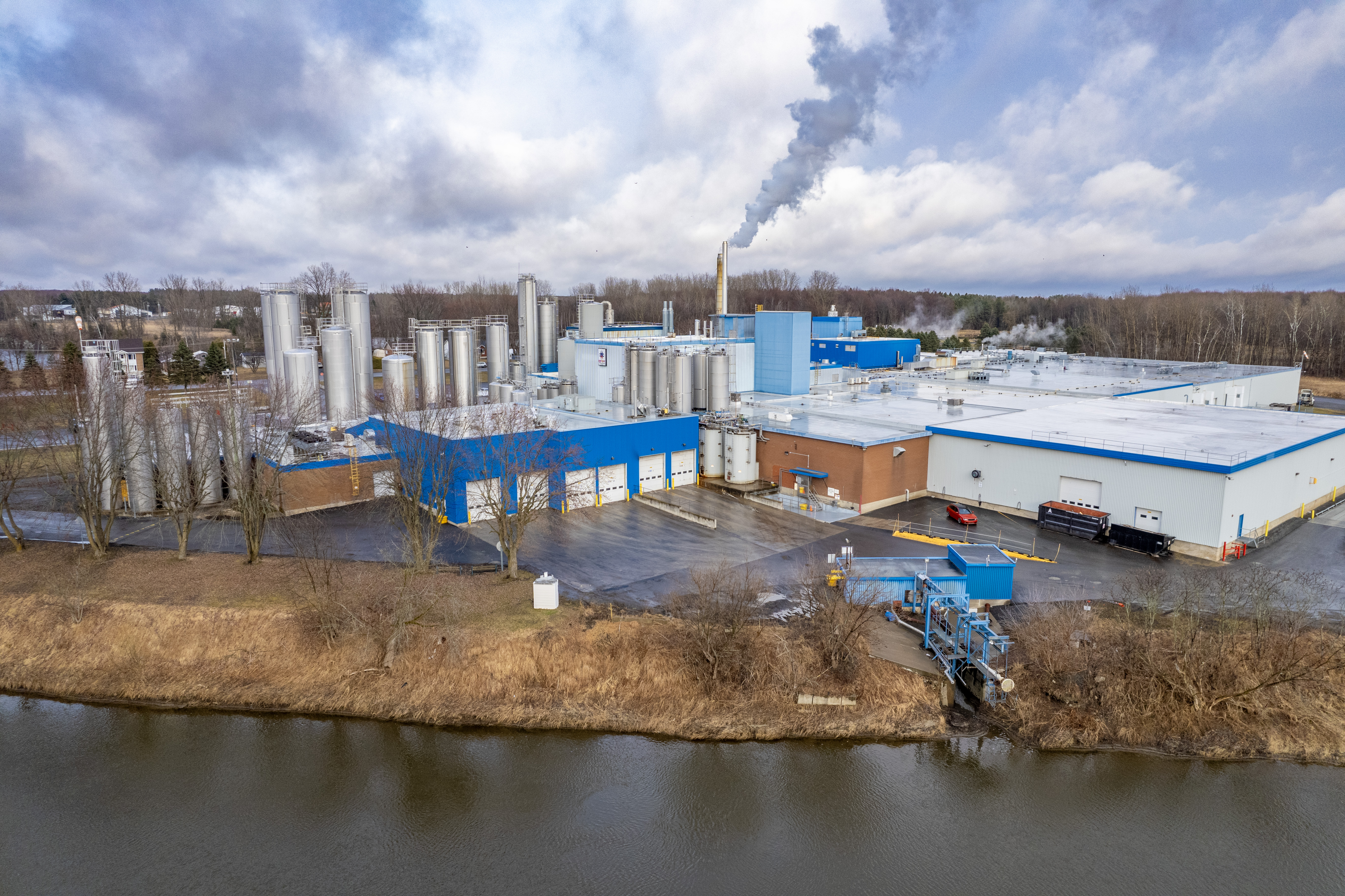
Agropur Factory

With the advent of the twentieth century, Notre-Dame-du-Bon-Conseil saw the arrival of electricity, street lighting, telephones and its first industries from the major resources of the region. These contributed to the influx of new residents who came to work in Sintra (Modern Paving and Construction Ltd.), Agropur (1954) and other companies like Nutribec (milling Camirand), Concrete St. Pierre and Piercon Limited.

The people of Good Counsel had to show a lot of character, as the village experienced some disasters. Indeed, on July 11, 1908, a fire destroyed in the space of 35 minutes, Notre-Dame-du-Bon-Conseil as well as Mitchell and Carmel. The latter did not fall but are no longer, as names of the past. For its part, the parish of Notre-Dame-du-Bon-Conseil was rebuilt and the new church was ready to receive the parishioners in 1910. The disasters of spring were hard on the village, with no fewer than five bridges being washed away by ice. However, the major bridge stood solidly for more than 35 years before its replacement with a new one in 2008.

The modern history of the municipality of Notre-Dame-du-Bon-Conseil begins with the municipal incorporation of the village in 1957. Shortly thereafter, in 1960, water and sewer are installed. As a part of its history, Notre-Dame-du-Bon-Conseil retains some buildings, including the ancestral home of Lambert and the church built in 1910.

== Location ==
Established on a site that is little hilly and traversed by the scenic Nicolet River, the site of Notre-Dame-du-Bon-Conseil has a location. Identified as one of the poles of the Regional Municipality of the County of Drummond, Bon-Conseil is located at the crossroads of the main centers of region 04 (Drummondville, Trois-Rivières, Victoriaville). At the intersection of Route 122 and 259, and close to Autoroute Jean-Lesage (Trans Canada), Notre-Dame-du-Bon-Conseil allows its residents to reach nearly 80% of the population Quebec in just over 60 minutes.

== Local Services ==
The municipality of Notre-Dame-du-Bon-Conseil offers villagers the following luxuries:

- Snow removal on streets and sidewalks
- Collection of household waste every Friday (every two weeks from November 15 to April 15)
- Bulk waste collection twice a year
- Collection of recyclable material every two weeks on Fridays
- Waterworks and sewer
- Wastewater treatment plant
- Common fire department
- Sûreté du Québec
- School crossing guard
- Recreation and Community Services
- Newspaper "Le Villa-Joie" of Bon-Conseil
- Office Municipal d'Habitation

These services are provided in exchange for an active participation in one of the clubs or associations listed below.

== Demographics ==
In the 2021 Census of Population conducted by Statistics Canada, Notre-Dame-du-Bon-Conseil had a population of 1,708 living in 711 of its 730 total private dwellings, a change of 9.7% from its 2016 population of 1,557. With a land area of 4.2 km^{2} (1.6 sq mi), it had a population density of 406.7/km^{2} (1,053.3/sq mi) in 2021.

Population trend:

Census	Population	Change (%)
2016	1,557	▲10.9%
2011	1,404	▼1.5%
2006	1,426	▼1.9%
2001	1,453	▲8.2%
1996	1,343	▲8.0%
1991	1,244	N/A

Mother tongue language (2016)

Language	Population	Pct (%)
French only	1,490	98.7%
English only	5	0.3%
Both English and French	5	0.3%
Other languages	10	0.7%

== See also ==
- List of village municipalities in Quebec
