= Saint-Cyrille-de-Wendover =

- Municipality
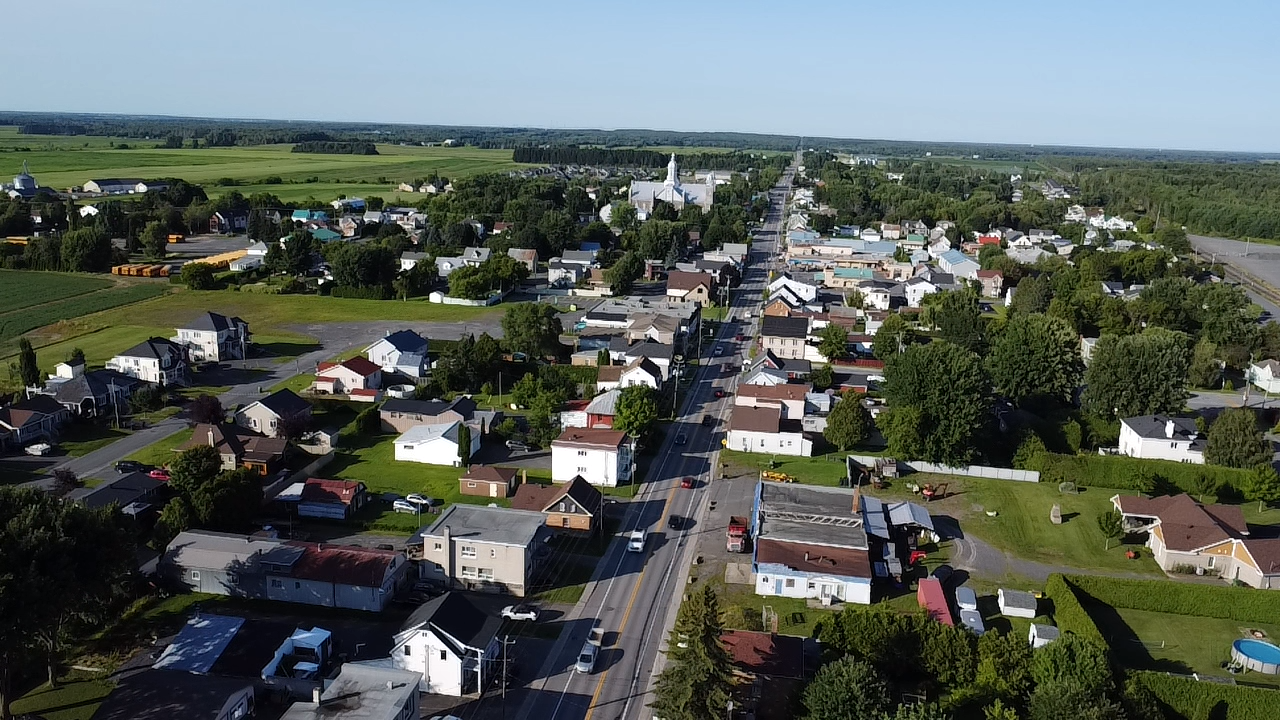

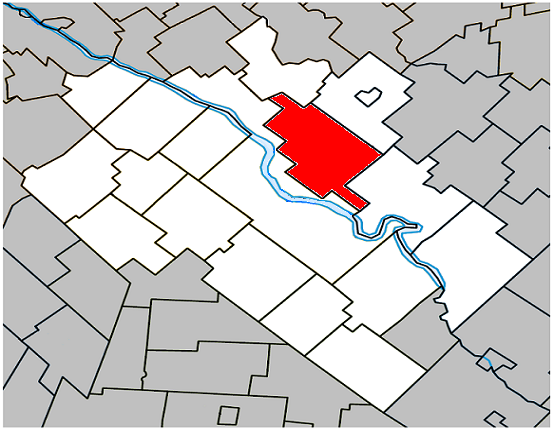
- Location within Drummond RCM.

- Location in southern Quebec.
- Coordinates: 45°56′N 72°26′W
- Country: Canada
- Province: Quebec
- Region: Centre-du-Québec
- RCM: Drummond
- Constituted: September 6, 1905

Government
  - Mayor: Éric Emond
  - Federal riding: Drummond
  - Prov. riding: Drummond–Bois-Francs

Area
  - Total: 110.40 km^{2} (42.63 sq mi)
  - Land: 110.30 km^{2} (42.59 sq mi)

Population (2011)
  - Total: 4,389
  - Density: 39.8/km^{2} (103/sq mi)
  - Pop 2006-2011: ▲7.6%
  - Dwellings: 1,671
- Time zone: UTC−5 (EST)
  - Summer (DST): UTC−4 (EDT)
- Postal code(s): J1Z 1C8
- Area code: 819
- Highways A-20 (TCH) A-55: R-122; R-255
- Website: www.stcyrille.qc.ca

Saint-Cyrille-de-Wendover (French pronunciation: [sɛ̃ siʁil də wɛndovɚ, -vœʁ]) is a Quebec municipality located in the Drummond Regional County Municipality, just east of Drummondville, in the Centre-du-Quebec region. The population as of the Canada 2011 Census was 4,389. The town is located alongside the Rivière des Saults.

The town, previously known as Saint-Cyrille, was created in 1905. It was merged in 1982 with the townships of Wendover and Simpson to form the current name. Being located in the middle of numerous townships and valleys, the municipality has agriculture as its predominant activity.

== Demographics ==
=== Population ===
Population trend:

| Census | Population | Change (%) |
|---|---|---|
| 2011 | 4,389 | ▲7.6% |
| 2006 | 4,079 | ▲5.6% |
| 2001 | 3,863 | ▲0.4% |
| 1996 | 3,849 | ▲4.5% |
| 1991 | 3,682 | N/A |

=== Language ===
Mother tongue language (2006)

| Language | Population | Pct (%) |
|---|---|---|
| French only | 3,990 | 98.40% |
| English only | 15 | 0.37% |
| Both English and French | 0 | 0.00% |
| Other languages | 50 | 1.23% |

== Transportation ==
Saint-Cyrille-de-Wendover's main transportation link is Quebec Route 122 which travels through most of the Centre-du-Quebec towards Victoriaville to the east and the Yamaska area in the west north of Autoroute 20, the main Autoroute of the province which travels a few kilometers to the north of town.

== See also ==
- List of municipalities in Quebec
