= Saint-Guillaume, Quebec =

Saint-Guillaume
- Municipality
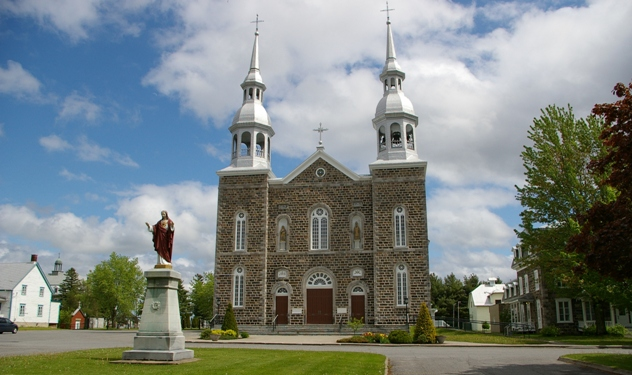

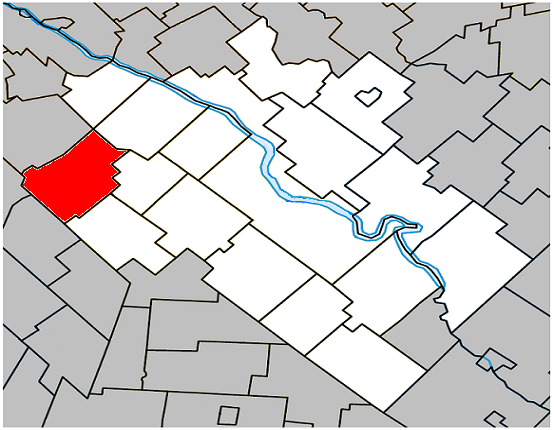
- Location within Drummond RCM.

- Location in southern Quebec.
- Coordinates: 45°53′N 72°46′W
- Country: Canada
- Province: Quebec
- Region: Centre-du-Québec
- RCM: Drummond
- Constituted: November 8, 1995

Government
  - Mayor: Alain Laprade
  - Federal riding: Drummond
  - Prov. riding: Marie-Lacoste-Gérin-Lajoie

Area
  - Total: 88.30 km^{2} (34.09 sq mi)
  - Land: 87.91 km^{2} (33.94 sq mi)

Population (2021)
  - Total: 1,491
  - Density: 17/km^{2} (44/sq mi)
  - Pop 2016-2021: ▲1.0%
  - Dwellings: 700
- Demonym: Guillaumien
- Time zone: UTC−5 (EST)
  - Summer (DST): UTC−4 (EDT)
- Postal code(s): J0C 1L0
- Area code: 819
- Highways: R-122; R-224; R-239
- Website: www.municipalite-st-guillaume.qc.ca

Saint-Guillaume (French pronunciation: [sɛ̃ ɡijom]) is a municipality in the Centre-du-Québec region of southwestern Quebec. The population as of the Canada 2021 Census was 1,491.

== Demographics ==
Population Population trend:

Census	Population	Change (%)
2021	1,491	▲1.0%
2016	1,476	▼4.6%
2011	1,547	▼2.0%
2006	1,578	▲0.2%
2001	1,575	▼1.4%
1996	1,598	N/A

Language Mother tongue language (2021)

Language	Population	Pct (%)
French only	1,445	98.0%
English only	15	1.0%
Both English and French	10	0.7%
Other languages	10	0.7%

== See also ==
- List of municipalities in Quebec
