= Les Trois-Lacs (Les Sources) =

Group of lakes in Quebec

Les Trois Lacs (Les Sources)
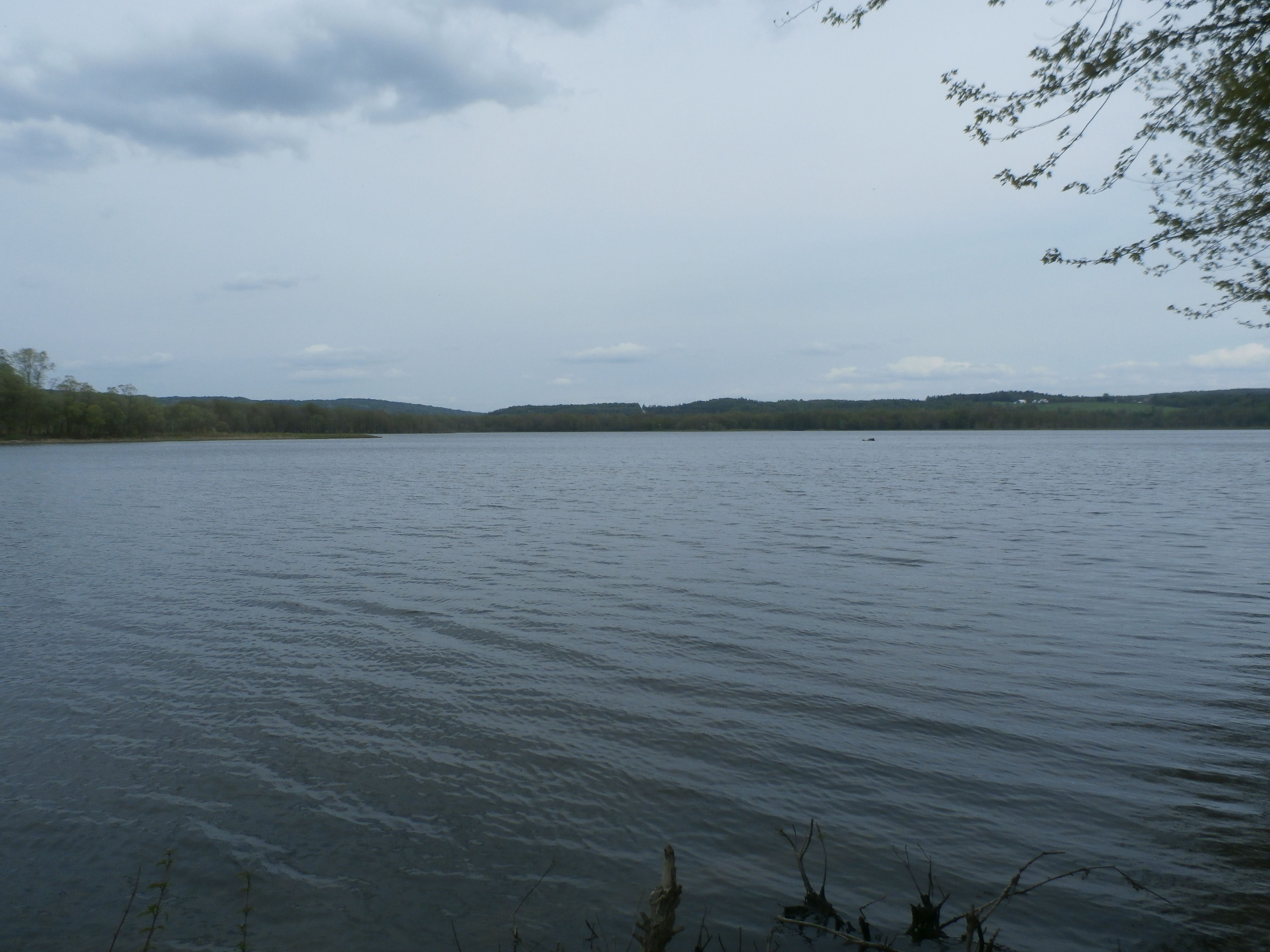
- Western part of the Three Lakes seen from the village of Trois-Lacs (now merged with Val-des-Sources).

- Location within Quebec
- Coordinates: 45.740833°N 70.86584°W
- Primary inflows: Nicolet Southwest River
- Primary outflows: Nicolet Southwest River
- Basin countries: Canada, Quebec, Estrie and Centre-du-Québec
- Max. length: 4.6 kilometres (2.9 mi)
- Max. width: 0.8 kilometres (0.50 mi)
- Average depth: 2.2 metres (7 ft 3 in)
- Max. depth: 8.7 metres (29 ft)
- Water volume: 5.53 cubic metres per second (195 cu ft/s)
- Surface elevation: 164 metres (538 ft)

Les Trois Lacs (transl. The Three Lakes) is a body of water shared between Les Sources Regional County Municipality, in Estrie, and Arthabaska Regional County Municipality, in administrative region of Centre-du-Québec. The body of water, divided into three units by points and bays, is located on the course of the Nicolet Southwest River.

== Geography ==
=== Features ===
The Three Lakes have an area 249 hectares (620 acres), 4.66 kilometres (2.90 mi) long and 0.8 kilometres (0.50 mi), bordered by 12.55 kilometres (7.80 mi) of rives. Acting as a sedimentation basin for the Nicolet Southwest River, they have experienced a decrease in their volume since 1949. In 2004, the average depth was 2.2 metres (7 ft 3 in). From 1975 to 2004, the estimated average depth loss was 20%.

=== Hydrography ===
The Trois Lacs are 88% fed by the Nicolet Sud-Ouest river, while other small rivers and streams flow into it around its shores: the Second Ruisseau, the Monfette stream, the Trout stream and the Boutin watercourse. The median flow at the outlet varies between 2.8 to 32.3 cubic metres per second (99 to 1,141 cu ft/s) depending on the period of the year.

The Three Lakes drain a watershed of 510 square kilometres (200 sq mi), covering the municipalities of Val-des-Sources, Saint-Rémi-de-Tingwick and Tingwick, which border the plan water, but also Saint-Adrien, Ham-Sud, Weedon, Dudswell, Saint-Camille, Saint-Georges-de-Windsor, Wotton and Danville. Two thirds of the watershed is occupied by forest; agriculture occupies 30% and urban vocations about 3%.

The water quality is poor, with high concentrations of phosphorus. These concentrations, as well as those of other chemical compounds in lake water, indicate that they are in an advanced process of eutrophication, accelerated by activities of human origin: drainage, urbanization, agricultural practices and deforestation.

== History ==
The body of water appears on a map by Joseph Bouchette in 1831 under the name Lac Richmond. The name subsequently evolved into forms that reflect its tripartite topography, namely Three Lakes, The Three, and Three Sisters. The toponym "Les Trois Lacs" was formalized by the Government of Quebec on December 12, 1968.
