= Drummond Regional County Municipality =

Drummond
- Regional county municipality
- Coordinates: 45°53′N 72°29′W
- Country: Canada
- Province: Quebec
- Region: Centre-du-Québec
- Effective: January 1, 1982
- County seat: Drummondville

Government
  - Type: Prefecture
  - Prefect: Jean-Pierre Vallée

Area
  - Total: 1,627.20 km^{2} (628.27 sq mi)
  - Land: 1,600.26 km^{2} (617.86 sq mi)

Population (2016)
  - Total: 103,397
  - Density: 64.6/km^{2} (167/sq mi)
  - Change 2011-2016: ▲4.8%
  - Dwellings: 47,581
- Time zone: UTC−5 (EST)
  - Summer (DST): UTC−4 (EDT)
- Area code: 819
- Website: www.mrcdrummond.qc.ca

Drummond (French pronunciation: [dʁɔmɔnd]) is a regional county municipality in the Centre-du-Québec region of Quebec, Canada. The seat is Drummondville.

== Subdivisions ==
There are 18 subdivisions within the RCM:

Cities & Towns (1)

- Drummondville

Municipalities (12)

- Durham-Sud
- L'Avenir
- Lefebvre
- Saint-Bonaventure
- Saint-Cyrille-de-Wendover
- Saint-Edmond-de-Grantham
- Saint-Eugène
- Saint-Félix-de-Kingsey
- Saint-Germain-de-Grantham
- Saint-Guillaume
- Saint-Lucien
- Wickham

Parishes (4)

- Notre-Dame-du-Bon-Conseil
- Sainte-Brigitte-des-Saults
- Saint-Majorique-de-Grantham
- Saint-Pie-de-Guire

Villages (1)

- Notre-Dame-du-Bon-Conseil

== Demographics ==
Mother tongue from 2016 Canadian Census

Language	Population	Pct (%)
French only	97,865	96.0%
English only	1,245	1.2%
Both English and French	460	0.5%
Other languages	2,380	2.3%

== Transportation ==
=== Access Routes ===
Highways and numbered routes that run through the municipality, including external routes that start or finish at the county border:

- Autoroutes
  - A-20 (TCH)
  - A-55
- Principal Highways
  - R-116
  - R-122
  - R-139
  - R-143
- Secondary Highways
  - R-224
  - R-239
  - R-243
  - R-255
  - R-259
- External Routes
  - None

== See also ==
- List of regional county municipalities and equivalent territories in Quebec
