= Sainte-Monique, Centre-du-Québec, Quebec =

Sainte-Monique
- Municipality

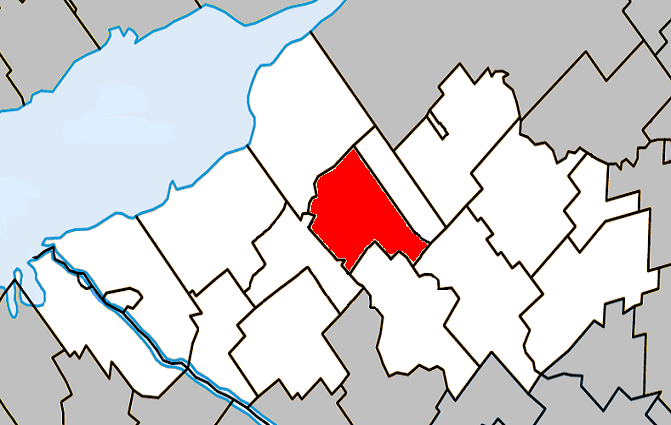
- Location within Nicolet-Yamaska RCM

- Location in southern Quebec
- Coordinates: 46°10′N 72°32′W
- Country: Canada
- Province: Quebec
- Region: Centre-du-Québec
- RCM: Nicolet-Yamaska
- Constituted: January 3, 1996

Government
  - Mayor: Sylvain Gélinas
  - Federal riding: Bécancour—Nicolet—Saurel—Alnôbak
  - Prov. riding: Nicolet-Bécancour

Area
  - Total: 59.60 km^{2} (23.01 sq mi)
  - Land: 58.00 km^{2} (22.39 sq mi)

Population (2011)
  - Total: 548
  - Density: 9.4/km^{2} (24/sq mi)
  - Pop 2006-2011: ▲2.2%
  - Dwellings: 243
- Time zone: UTC−5 (EST)
  - Summer (DST): UTC−4 (EDT)
- Postal code(s): J0G 1N0
- Area code: 819
- Highways: R-226; R-259
- Website: www.sainte-monique.ca

Sainte-Monique (French pronunciation: [sɛ̃t mɔnik]) is a municipality in the Centre-du-Québec region of the province of Quebec in Canada. The population as of the Canada 2011 Census was 548.

== Demographics ==
=== Population ===
Population trend:

Census	Population	Change (%)
2011	548	▲2.2%
2006	536	▼9.3%
2001	591	▼6.2%
Merger	630 (+)	▲30.5%
1996	438	▼8.4%
1991	478	N/A

(+) Amalgamation of the Parish and the Village of Sainte-Monique on January 3, 1996.

=== Language ===
Mother tongue language (2006)

Language	Population	Pct (%)
French only	530	100.00%
English only	0	0.00%
Both English and French	0	0.00%
Other languages	0	0.00%

== See also ==
- List of municipalities in Quebec
- 20th-century municipal history of Quebec
