= Notre-Dame-du-Bon-Conseil, Quebec (parish) =

Notre-Dame-du-Bon-Conseil
- Parish municipality
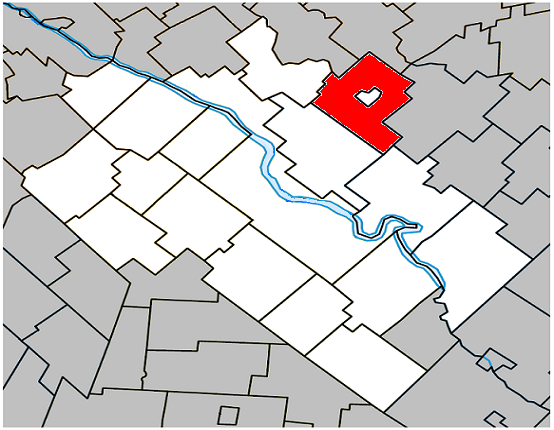
- Location within Drummond RCM.

- Location in southern Quebec.
- Coordinates: 46°00′N 72°21′W
- Country: Canada
- Province: Quebec
- Region: Centre-du-Québec
- RCM: Drummond
- Constituted: February 15, 1898

Government
  - Mayor: Stéphane Dionne
  - Federal riding: Drummond
  - Prov. riding: Drummond–Bois-Francs

Area
  - Total: 87.90 km^{2} (33.94 sq mi)
  - Land: 87.49 km^{2} (33.78 sq mi)

Population (2021)
  - Total: 885
  - Density: 10.1/km^{2} (26/sq mi)
  - Pop 2016-2021: ▼6.7%
  - Dwellings: 409
- Time zone: UTC−5 (EST)
  - Summer (DST): UTC−4 (EDT)
- Postal code(s): J0C 1A0
- Area code: 819
- Highways A-20 (TCH) A-55: R-122; R-155; R-259
- Website: www.paroissendbc.ca

Notre-Dame-du-Bon-Conseil (French pronunciation: [nɔtʁə dam dy bɔ̃ kɔ̃sɛj]) is a parish municipality located in the Drummond Regional County Municipality in the Centre-du-Quebec region of Quebec. The population as of the Canada 2021 Census was 885. The municipality completely encircles the village that is also called Notre-Dame-du-Bon-Conseil.

== Demographics ==
In the 2021 Census of Population conducted by Statistics Canada, Notre-Dame-du-Bon-Conseil had a population of 885 living in 391 of its 409 total private dwellings, a change of −6.7% from its 2016 population of 949. With a land area of 87.49 km^{2} (33.78 sq mi), it had a population density of 10.1/km^{2} (26.2/sq mi) in 2021.

Population trend:

Census	Population	Change (%)
2021	885	▼6.7%
2016	949	▼3.1%
2011	979	▲7.3%
2006	912	▼7.3%
2001	984	▲2.9%
1996	956	▼4.3%
1991	999	N/A

Mother tongue language (2006)

Language	Population	Pct (%)
French only	860	94.50%
English only	15	1.65%
Both English and French	15	1.65%
Other languages	30	3.30%

== See also ==
- List of parish municipalities in Quebec
