= Sainte-Clotilde-de-Horton =

- Municipality
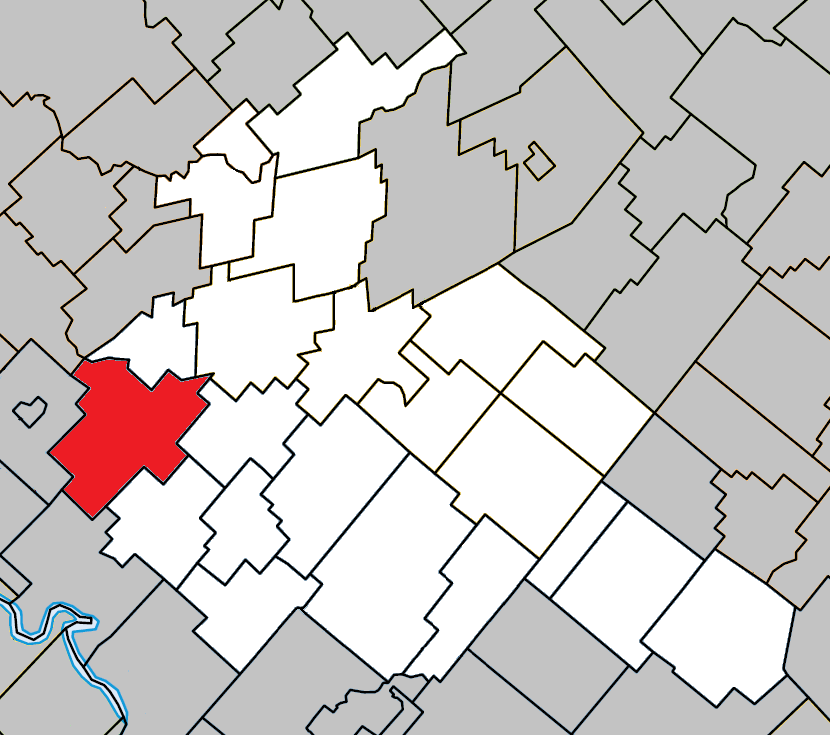
- Location within Arthabaska RCM.

- Location in southern Quebec.
- Coordinates: 45°59′N 72°14′W
- Country: Canada
- Province: Quebec
- Region: Centre-du-Québec
- RCM: Arthabaska
- Constituted: March 26, 1997

Government
  - Mayor: Julie Ricard
  - Federal riding: Richmond—Arthabaska—des-Sources
  - Prov. riding: Drummond–Bois-Francs

Area
  - Total: 117.10 km^{2} (45.21 sq mi)
  - Land: 114.08 km^{2} (44.05 sq mi)

Population (2011)
  - Total: 1,616
  - Density: 14.2/km^{2} (37/sq mi)
  - Pop 2006-2011: ▲3.6%
- Time zone: UTC−5 (EST)
  - Summer (DST): UTC−4 (EDT)
- Postal code(s): J0A 1H0
- Area code: 819
- Highways: R-122
- Website: www.steclotildehorton.ca

Sainte-Clotilde-de-Horton is a municipality located in the Centre-du-Québec region of Quebec, Canada.

It was formed on March 26, 1997 by the merger of the village of Sainte-Clotilde-de-Horton, the parish municipality of Sainte-Clothilde-de-Horton (note spelling), and the municipality of Saint-Jacques-de-Horton. Prior to February 9, 1991, the name of the village was also spelled Sainte-Clothilde-de-Horton.
