= Saint-Lucien, Quebec =

Saint-Lucien
- Municipality
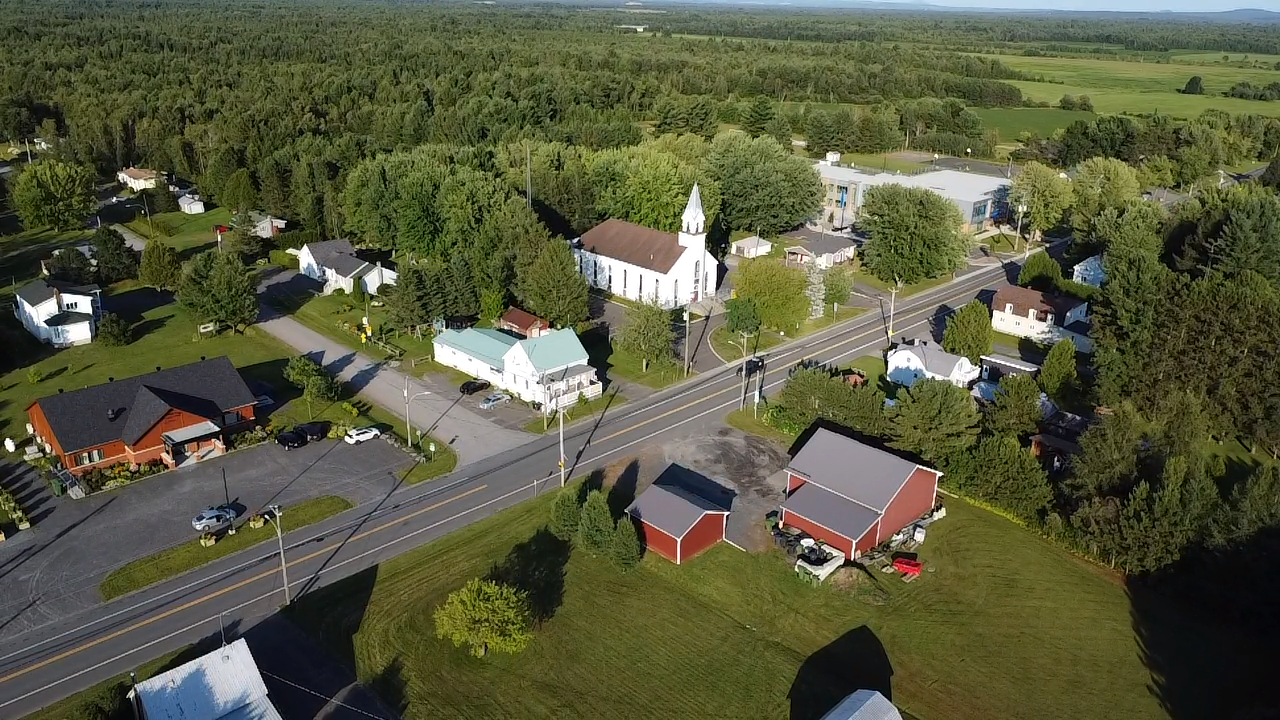

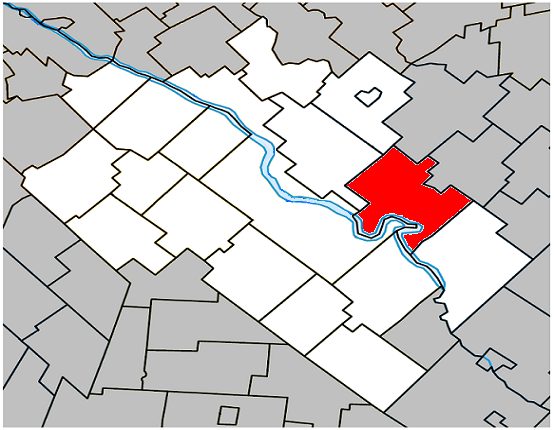
- Location within Drummond RCM.

- Location in southern Quebec.
- Coordinates: 45°52′N 72°16′W
- Country: Canada
- Province: Quebec
- Region: Centre-du-Québec
- RCM: Drummond
- Constituted: November 11, 1907

Government
  - Mayor: Christian Lemire
  - Federal riding: Drummond
  - Prov. riding: Drummond–Bois-Francs

Area
  - Total: 114.10 km^{2} (44.05 sq mi)
  - Land: 111.41 km^{2} (43.02 sq mi)

Population (2011)
  - Total: 1,584
  - Density: 14.2/km^{2} (37/sq mi)
  - Pop 2006-2011: ▲5.0%
  - Dwellings: 939
- Time zone: UTC−5 (EST)
  - Summer (DST): UTC−4 (EDT)
- Postal code(s): J0C 1N0
- Area code: 819
- Highways: R-255

Saint-Lucien (French pronunciation: [sɛ̃ lysjɛ̃]) is a municipality in the Drummond Regional County Municipality in the Centre-du-Quebec region of Quebec. The population as of the Canada 2011 Census was 1,584.

On June 30, 2012, it changed its status from parish municipality to municipality.

== Demographics ==
=== Population ===
Population trend:

Census	Population	Change (%)
2011	1,584	▲5.0%
2006	1,508	▲18.5%
2001	1,273	▲4.3%
1996	1,220	▲6.6%
1991	1,145	N/A

=== Language ===
Mother tongue language (2006)

Language	Population	Pct (%)
French only	1,500	100.00%
English only	1	0.00%
Both English and French	2	0.00%
Other languages	0	0.00%

== See also ==
- List of municipalities in Quebec
