= Saint-Zéphirin-de-Courval =

- Parish municipality

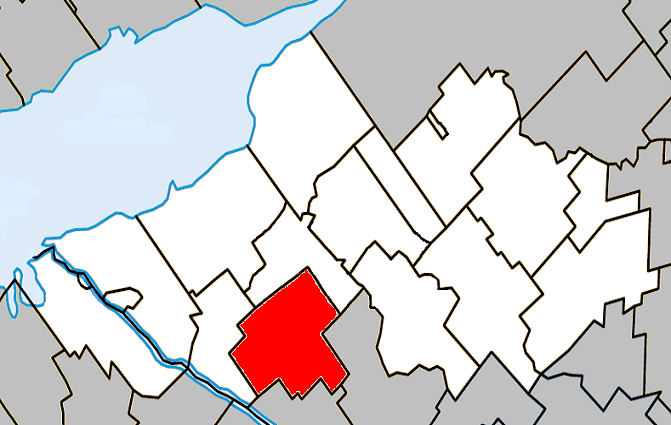
- Location within Nicolet-Yamaska RCM.

- Location in southern Quebec.
- Coordinates: 46°04′N 72°38′W
- Country: Canada
- Province: Quebec
- Region: Centre-du-Québec
- RCM: Nicolet-Yamaska
- Constituted: July 1, 1855

Government
  - Mayor: Mathieu Lemire
  - Federal riding: Bécancour—Nicolet—Saurel—Alnôbak
  - Prov. riding: Nicolet-Bécancour

Area
  - Total: 71.70 km^{2} (27.68 sq mi)
  - Land: 71.97 km^{2} (27.79 sq mi)
- There is an apparent contradiction between two authoritative sources

Population (2011)
  - Total: 737
  - Density: 10.2/km^{2} (26/sq mi)
  - Pop 2006-2011: ▼10.7%
  - Dwellings: 308
- Time zone: UTC−5 (EST)
  - Summer (DST): UTC−4 (EDT)
- Postal code(s): J0G 1V0
- Area codes: 450 and 579
- Highways: R-255
- Website: www.saint-zephirin.ca

Saint-Zéphirin-de-Courval (French pronunciation: [sɛ̃ zefiʁɛ̃ də kuʁval]) is a parish municipality located in the Nicolet-Yamaska Regional County Municipality of Quebec. The population as of the Canada 2011 Census was 737.

== Demographics ==
In the 2021 Census of Population conducted by Statistics Canada, Saint-Zéphirin-de-Courval had a population of 707 living in 291 of its 310 total private dwellings, a change of 1% from its 2016 population of 700. With a land area of 71.94 km^{2} (27.78 sq mi), it had a population density of 9.8/km^{2} (25.5/sq mi) in 2021.

Population trend:

Census	Population	Change (%)
2011	737	▼10.7%
2006	825	0.0%
2001	825	▲3.6%
1996	796	▲0.9%
1991	789	N/A

Mother tongue language (2006)

Language	Population	Pct (%)
French only	805	97.58%
English only	10	1.21%
Both English and French	0	0.00%
Other languages	10	1.21%

== See also ==
- List of parish municipalities in Quebec
