= Sainte-Perpétue, Centre-du-Québec =

Sainte-Perpétue
- Parish municipality
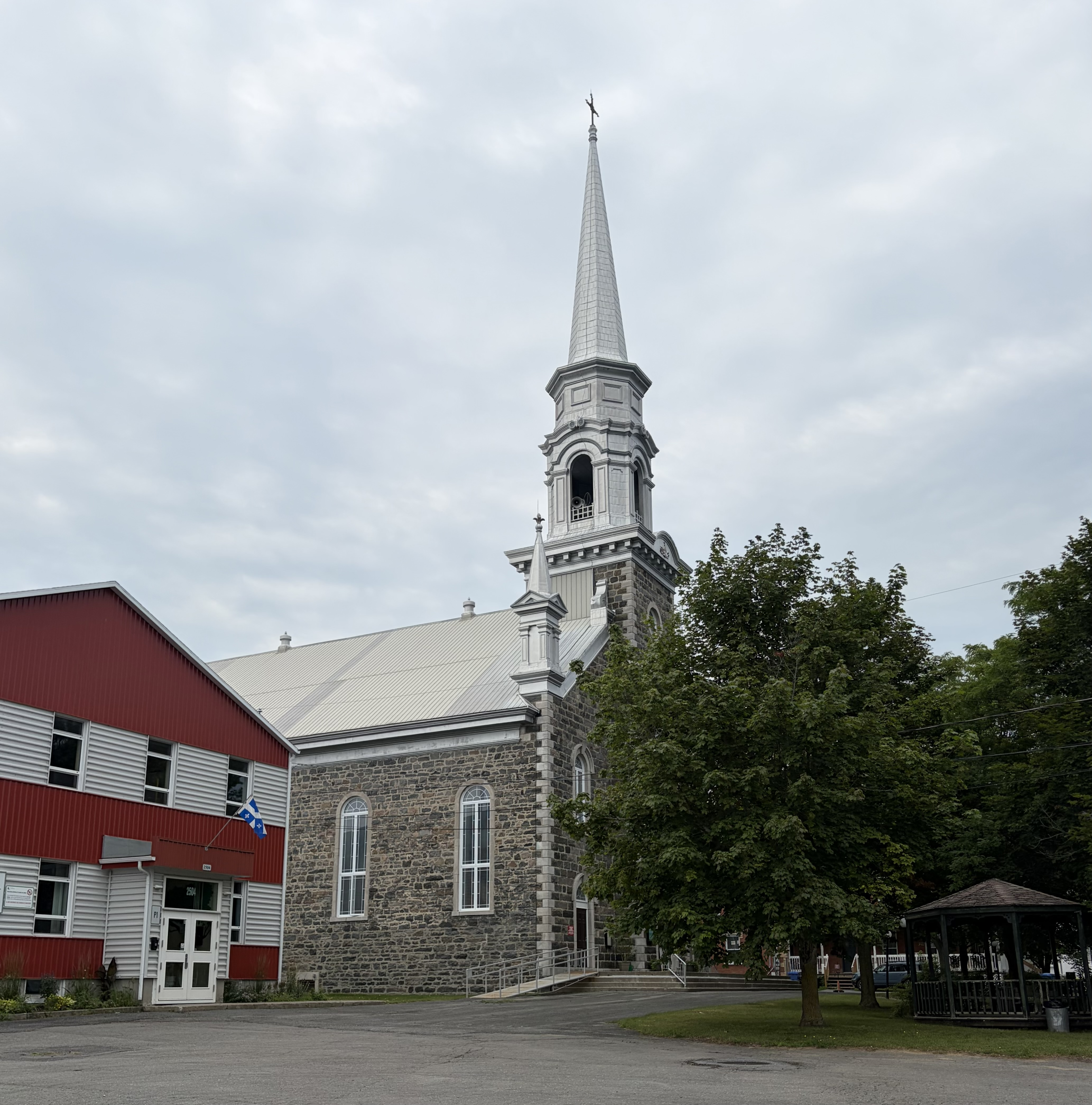
- Église Notre-Dame-de-Paix in Sainte-Perpétue

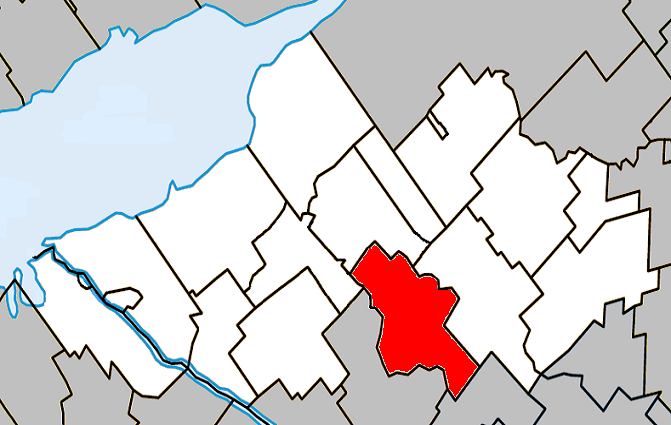
- Location within Nicolet-Yamaska RCM.

- Location in southern Quebec.
- Coordinates: 46°05′N 72°28′W
- Country: Canada
- Province: Quebec
- Region: Centre-du-Québec
- RCM: Nicolet-Yamaska
- Constituted: March 9, 1878

Government
  - Mayor: Jean-Luc Boisclair
  - Federal riding: Bécancour—Nicolet—Saurel—Alnôbak
  - Prov. riding: Nicolet-Bécancour

Area
  - Total: 71.70 km^{2} (27.68 sq mi)
  - Land: 71.51 km^{2} (27.61 sq mi)

Population (2021)
  - Total: 916
  - Density: 12.8/km^{2} (33/sq mi)
  - Pop 2016-2021: ▼4.5%
  - Dwellings: 407
- Time zone: UTC−5 (EST)
  - Summer (DST): UTC−4 (EDT)
- Postal code(s): J0C 1R0
- Area code: 819
- Highways: R-259

Sainte-Perpétue (French pronunciation: [sɛ̃t pɛʁpety]) is a parish municipality in the Centre-du-Québec region of Quebec, Canada, situated along Route 259. The population as of the Canada 2021 Census was 916.

== Demographics ==
In the 2021 Census of Population conducted by Statistics Canada, Sainte-Perpétue had a population of 916 living in 384 of its 407 total private dwellings, a change of −4.5% from its 2016 population of 959. With a land area of 71.51 km^{2} (27.61 sq mi), it had a population density of 12.8/km^{2} (33.2/sq mi) in 2021.

Population trend:

| Census | Population | Change (%) |
|---|---|---|
| 2021 | 916 | ▼4.5% |
| 2016 | 959 | ▼2.4% |
| 2011 | 983 | ▲2.5% |
| 2006 | 959 | ▼3.4% |
| 2001 | 993 | ▼3.0% |
| 1996 | 1,024 | ▲1.1% |
| 1991 | 1,013 | ▼1.7% |
| 1986 | 1,030 | ▼0.7% |
| 1981 | 1,037 | ▲1.4% |
| 1976 | 1,023 | ▲3.3% |
| 1971 | 990 | ▼11.5% |
| 1966 | 1,119 | ▼3.5% |
| 1961 | 1,160 | ▼5.8% |
| 1956 | 1,232 | ▲12.9% |
| 1951 | 1,091 | ▲1.5% |
| 1941 | 1,075 | ▼1.3% |
| 1931 | 1,089 | ▼11.6% |
| 1921 | 1,232 | ▼3.9% |
| 1911 | 1,282 | ▲36.5% |
| 1901 | 939 | ▲12.7% |
| 1891 | 833 | ▲79.1% |
| 1881 | 465 | N/A |

Mother tongue language (2021)

| Language | Population | Pct (%) |
|---|---|---|
| French only | 885 | 96.7% |
| English only | 5 | 0.5% |
| Both English and French | 0 | 0.0% |
| Other languages | 20 | 2.2% |

== Attractions ==
A primarily agricultural area, Sainte-Perpétue is best known throughout the province of Quebec for its Festival du cochon (Pig festival), featuring, among other things, several days of live music, a human-versus-pig mud wrestling competition, and a boar catching competition.

== See also ==
- List of parish municipalities in Quebec
