= Quebec Route 259 =

Highway in Quebec, Canada

Route 259

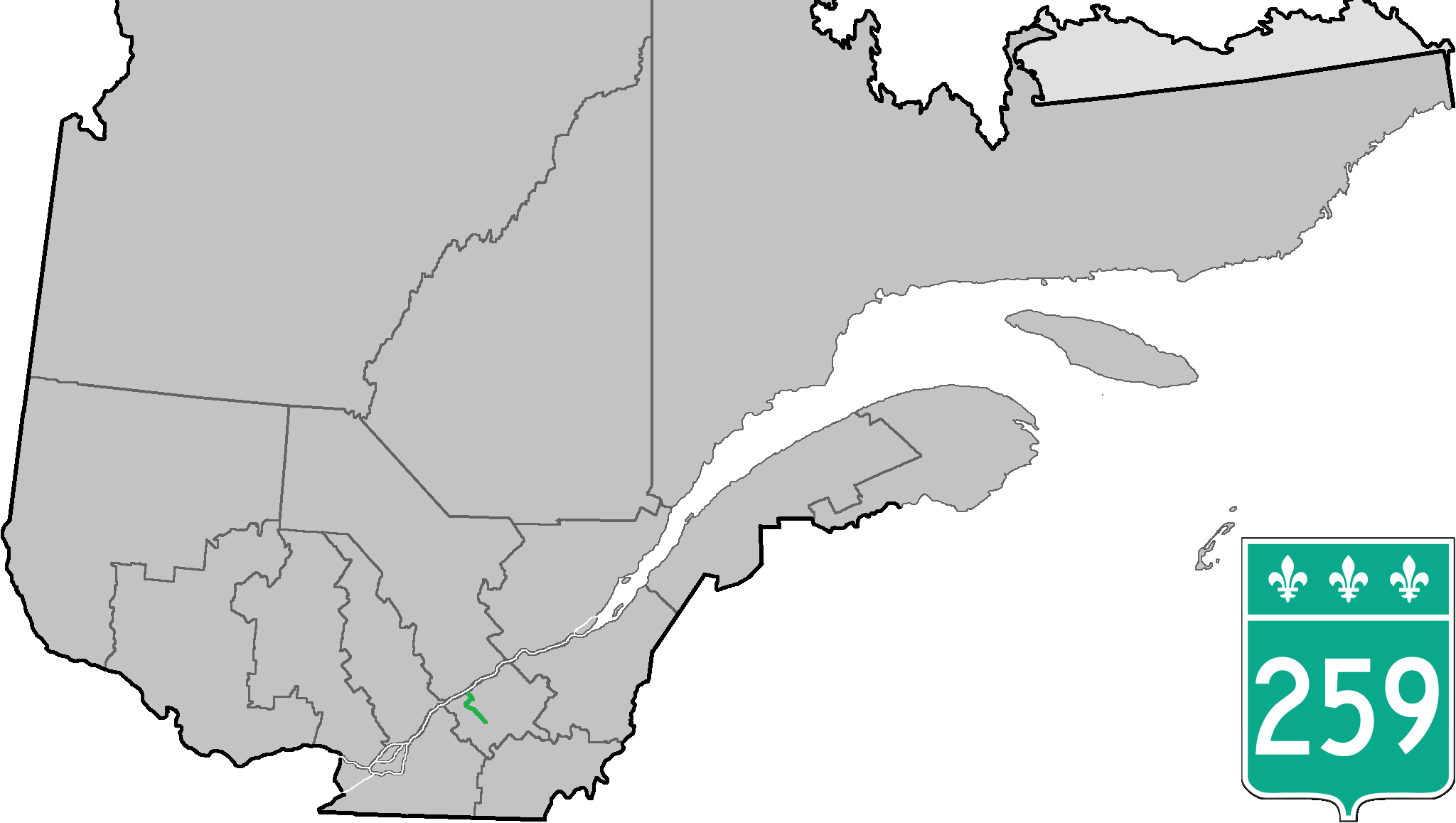

Route information
- Length: 37 km (23 mi)

Major junctions
- South end: R-122 in Notre-Dame-du-Bon-Conseil
- A-20 (TCH) / A-55 in Notre-Dame-du-Bon-Conseil
- North end: R-132 near Nicolet

Location
- Country: Canada
- Province: Quebec
- Major cities: Nicolet

Highway system
- Quebec provincial highways; Autoroutes; List; Former
← R-257	→ R-261

Route 259 is a north–south highway on the south shore of the St. Lawrence River in Quebec, Canada. Its northern terminus is in Nicolet at the junction of Route 132 and its southern terminus is in Notre-Dame-du-Bon-Conseil at the junction of Route 122.

== Municipalities along Route 259 ==
- Nicolet
- Sainte-Monique
- Sainte-Perpétue
- Notre-Dame-du-Bon-Conseil

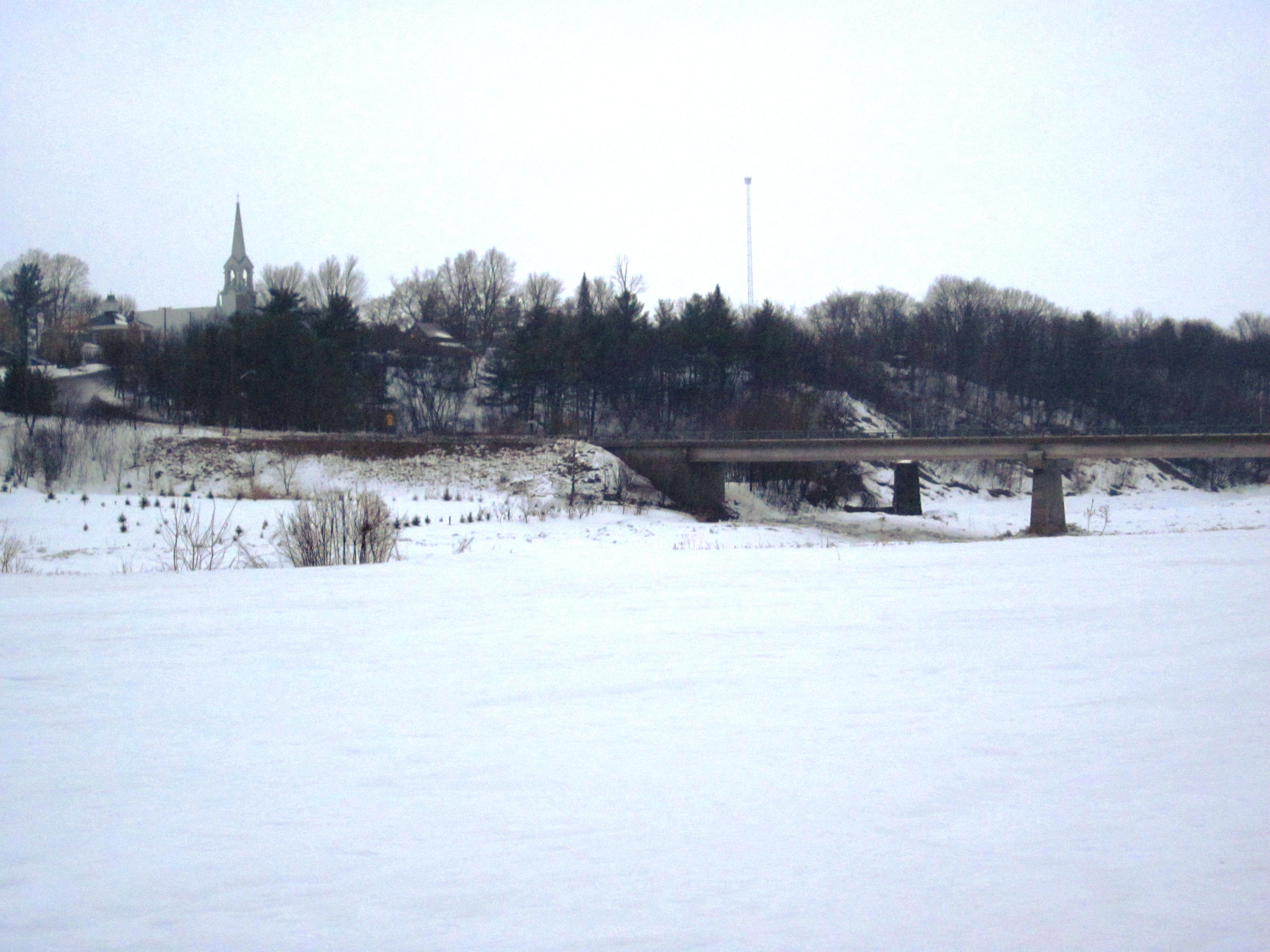
Route 259 crosses Nicolet River in Sainte-Monique.

== See also ==
- List of Quebec provincial highways
