= La Visitation-de-Yamaska =

- Municipality

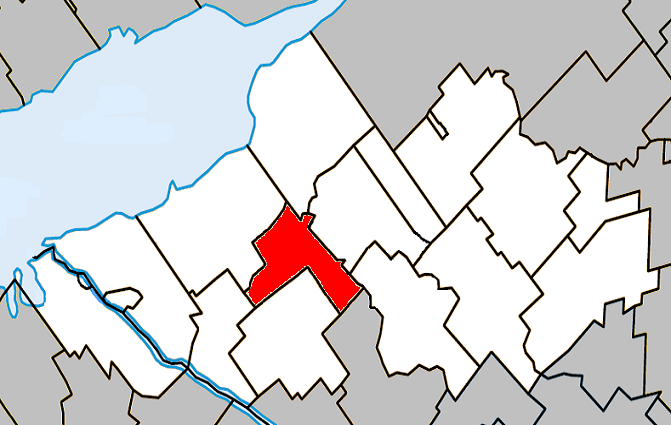
- Location within Nicolet-Yamaska RCM

- Location in southern Quebec
- Coordinates: 46°08′N 72°36′W
- Country: Canada
- Province: Quebec
- Region: Centre-du-Québec
- RCM: Nicolet-Yamaska
- Constituted: February 2, 1899

Government
  - Mayor: Alain Vouligny
  - Federal riding: Bécancour—Nicolet—Saurel—Alnôbak
  - Prov. riding: Nicolet-Bécancour

Area
  - Total: 43.50 km^{2} (16.80 sq mi)
  - Land: 42.65 km^{2} (16.47 sq mi)

Population (2021)
  - Total: 295
  - Density: 6.9/km^{2} (18/sq mi)
  - Pop 2016-2021: ▼9.8%
  - Dwellings: 149
- Time zone: UTC−5 (EST)
  - Summer (DST): UTC−4 (EDT)
- Postal code(s): J0G 1C0
- Area codes: 450 and 579
- Highways: R-226; R-255
- Website: www.lavisitationdeyamaska.net

La Visitation-de-Yamaska (French pronunciation: [la vizitasjɔ̃ də jamaska]) is a municipality in the Centre-du-Québec region of the province of Quebec in Canada. The population as of the Canada 2021 Census was 295.

== Demographics ==
=== Population ===
Population trend:

Census	Population	Change (%)
2021	295	▼9.8%
2016	327	▼1.2%
2011	331	▼4.9%
2006	348	▼11.5%
2001	393	▼1.8%
1996	400	▲0.3%
1991	399	N/A

=== Language ===
Mother tongue language (2006)

Language	Population	Pct (%)
French only	375	100.00%
English only	0	0.00%
Both English and French	0	0.00%
Other languages	0	0.00%

== See also ==
- List of municipalities in Quebec
