= Saint-Léonard-d'Aston =

- Municipality
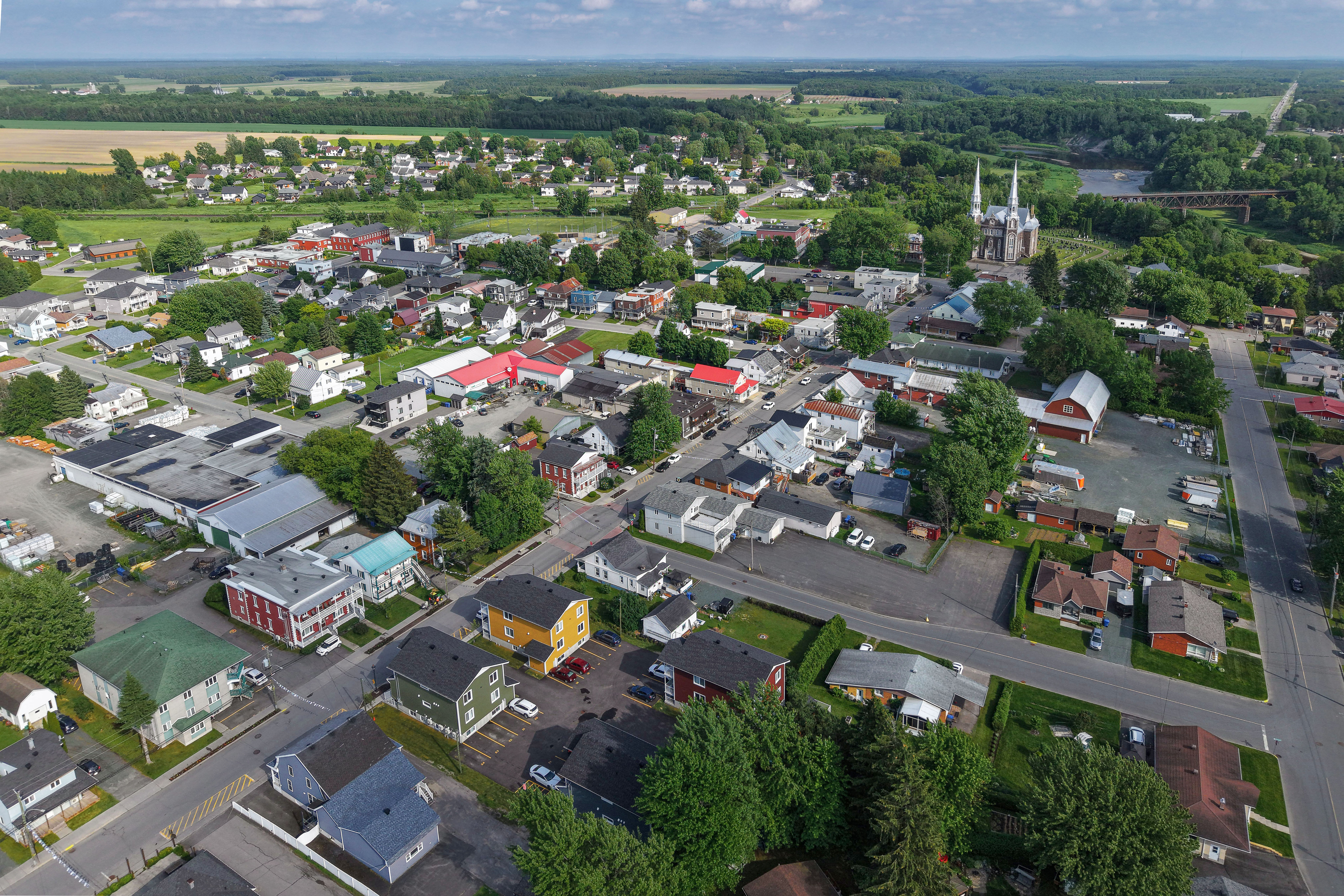
- Saint-Léonard-d'Aston in 2026

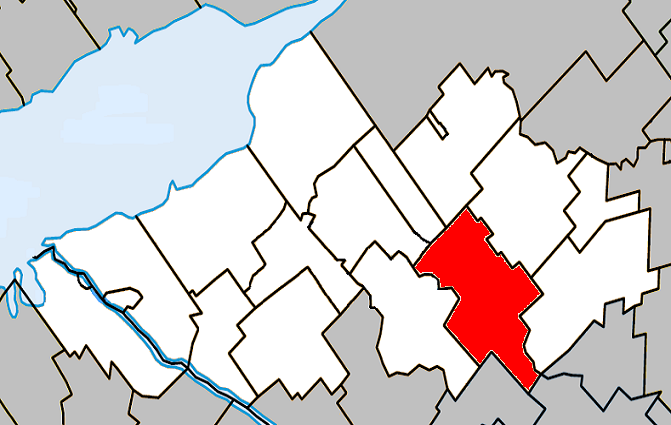
- Location within Nicolet-Yamaska RCM.

- Location in southern Quebec.
- Coordinates: 46°06′N 72°22′W
- Country: Canada
- Province: Quebec
- Region: Centre-du-Québec
- RCM: Nicolet-Yamaska
- Constituted: April 13, 1994

Government
  - Mayor: Laurent Marcotte
  - Federal riding: Bécancour—Nicolet—Saurel—Alnôbak
  - Prov. riding: Nicolet-Bécancour

Area
  - Total: 84.80 km^{2} (32.74 sq mi)
  - Land: 82.55 km^{2} (31.87 sq mi)

Population (2021)
  - Total: 2,530
  - Density: 30.6/km^{2} (79/sq mi)
  - Pop 2016-2021: ▲8.5%
  - Dwellings: 1,163
- Time zone: UTC−5 (EST)
  - Summer (DST): UTC−4 (EDT)
- Postal code(s): J0C 1M0
- Area code: 819
- Highways A-20 (TCH) A-55: R-155
- Website: www.saint-leonard -daston.net

Saint-Léonard-d'Aston (French pronunciation: [sɛ̃ leɔnaʁ dastɔn]) is a municipality in Nicolet-Yamaska RCM in the province of Quebec, Canada. The population as of the Canada 2021 Census was 2,530. The municipality is situated along Route 155, partway between Drummondville and Trois-Rivières. Autoroute 20 and a major intercity railway line, part of Canadian National Railway over which VIA Rail Canada passenger trains also operate, cross through the town. Until the completion of the northern branch of Autoroute 55 in October 2006, Saint-Léonard-d'Aston was a common waypoint for those who travelled between Trois-Rivières and Sherbrooke.

== Demographics ==
Population Population trend:

Census	Population	Change (%)
2021	2,530	▲8.5%
2016	2,331	▲2.6%
2011	2,271	▲5.8%
2006	2,146	▼3.8%
2001	2,231	▲0.7%
1996	2,216	N/A

Language Mother tongue language (2021)

Language	Population	Pct (%)
French only	2,445	97.8%
English only	10	0.4%
Both English and French	10	0.4%
Other languages	30	1.2%

== Attractions ==
Along Autoroute 20, on exit 202, halfway between Montreal and Quebec City, stands a restaurant that bore four names and four different styles along the years, first Moulin Rouge, then Madrid, after Manoir Big Foot, and now Le Madrid 2.0. At the end of the '80s, during the Madrid period, the place was notable for its bizarre decorations: large monster trucks parked outside next to a line of larger-than-life statues of dinosaurs. In 2011, plans were announced to demolish the restaurant and replace it with "Le Madrid 2.0" which now includes conventional fast-food restaurants.

== See also ==
- List of municipalities in Quebec
