= Sainte-Brigitte-des-Saults =

- Parish municipality
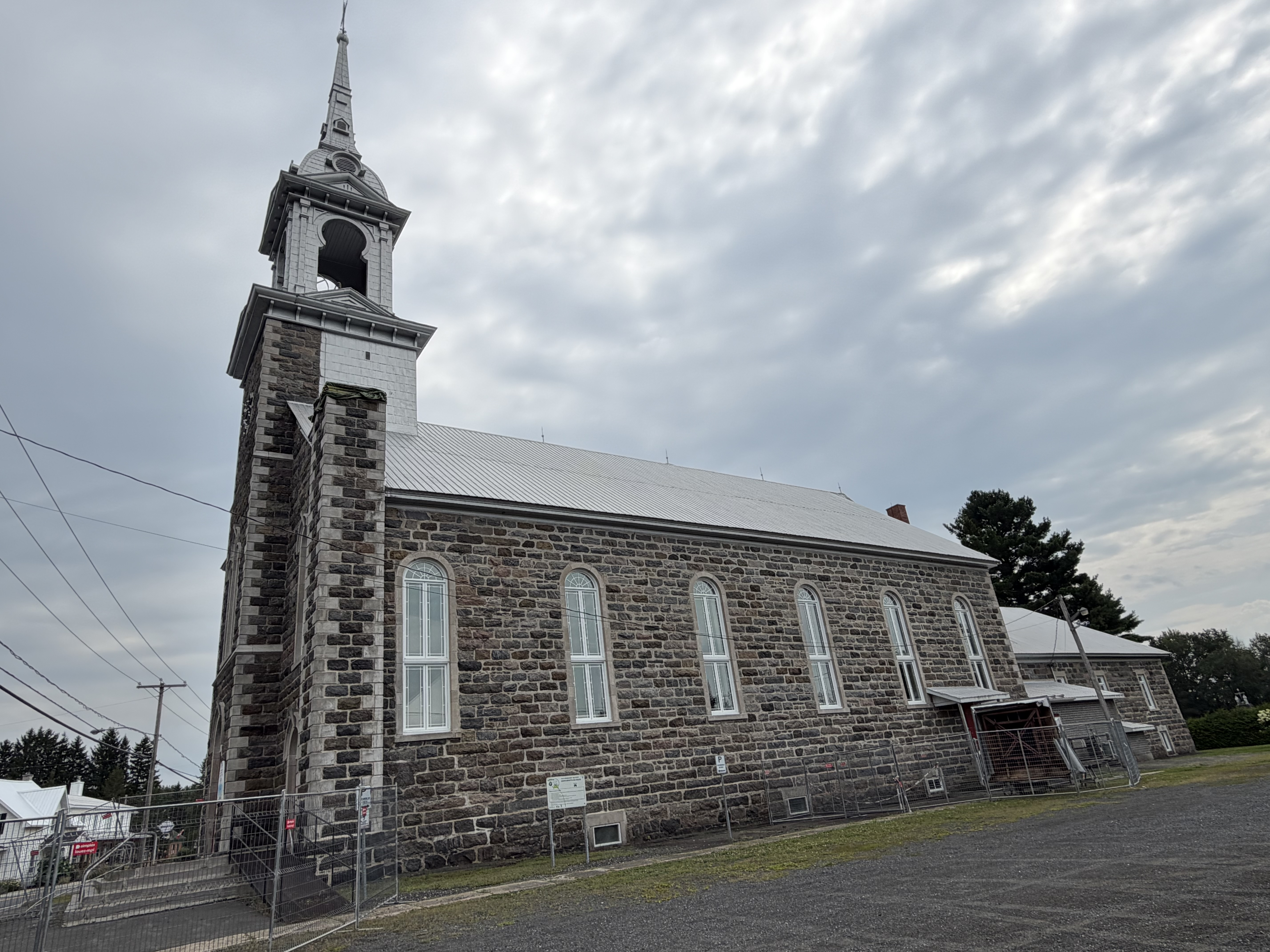
- Église Ste.-Brigitte-des-Saults

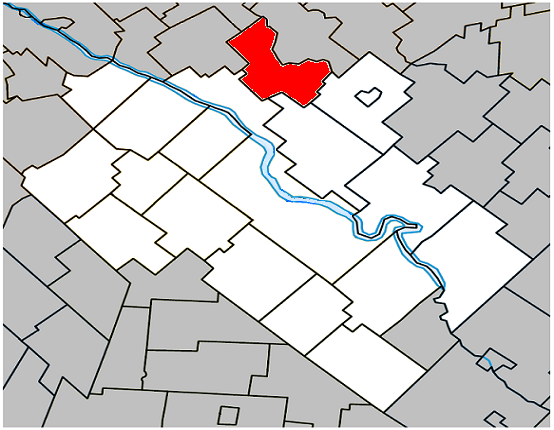
- Location within Drummond RCM.

- Location in southern Quebec.
- Coordinates: 46°02′N 72°29′W
- Country: Canada
- Province: Quebec
- Region: Centre-du-Québec
- RCM: Drummond
- Constituted: March 9, 1878

Government
  - Mayor: Alain Conraud
  - Federal riding: Drummond
  - Prov. riding: Drummond–Bois-Francs

Area
  - Total: 72.00 km^{2} (27.80 sq mi)
  - Land: 71.87 km^{2} (27.75 sq mi)

Population (2011)
  - Total: 737
  - Density: 10.3/km^{2} (27/sq mi)
  - Pop 2006-2011: ▼0.3%
  - Dwellings: 304
- Time zone: UTC−5 (EST)
  - Summer (DST): UTC−4 (EDT)
- Postal code(s): J0C 1E0
- Area code: 819
- Highways: No major routes
- Website: www.sainte brigittedessaults.ca

Sainte-Brigitte-des-Saults (French pronunciation: [sɛ̃t bʁiʒit de so]) is a parish municipality in the Centre-du-Québec region of southwestern Quebec. The population as of the Canada 2011 Census was 737.

== Demographics ==
In the 2021 Census of Population conducted by Statistics Canada, Sainte-Brigitte-des-Saults had a population of 737 living in 305 of its 321 total private dwellings, a change of 1.9% from its 2016 population of 723. With a land area of 70.79 km^{2} (27.33 sq mi), it had a population density of 10.4/km^{2} (27.0/sq mi) in 2021.

Population trend:

Census	Population	Change (%)
2011	737	▼0.3%
2006	739	▲2.1%
2001	724	▼1.6%
1996	736	▼3.8%
1991	765	N/A

Mother tongue language (2006)

Language	Population	Pct (%)
French only	700	95.24%
English only	15	2.04%
Both English and French	0	0.00%
Other languages	20	2.72%

== See also ==
- List of parish municipalities in Quebec
