= Quebec Route 255 =

Highway in Quebec, Canada

Route 255

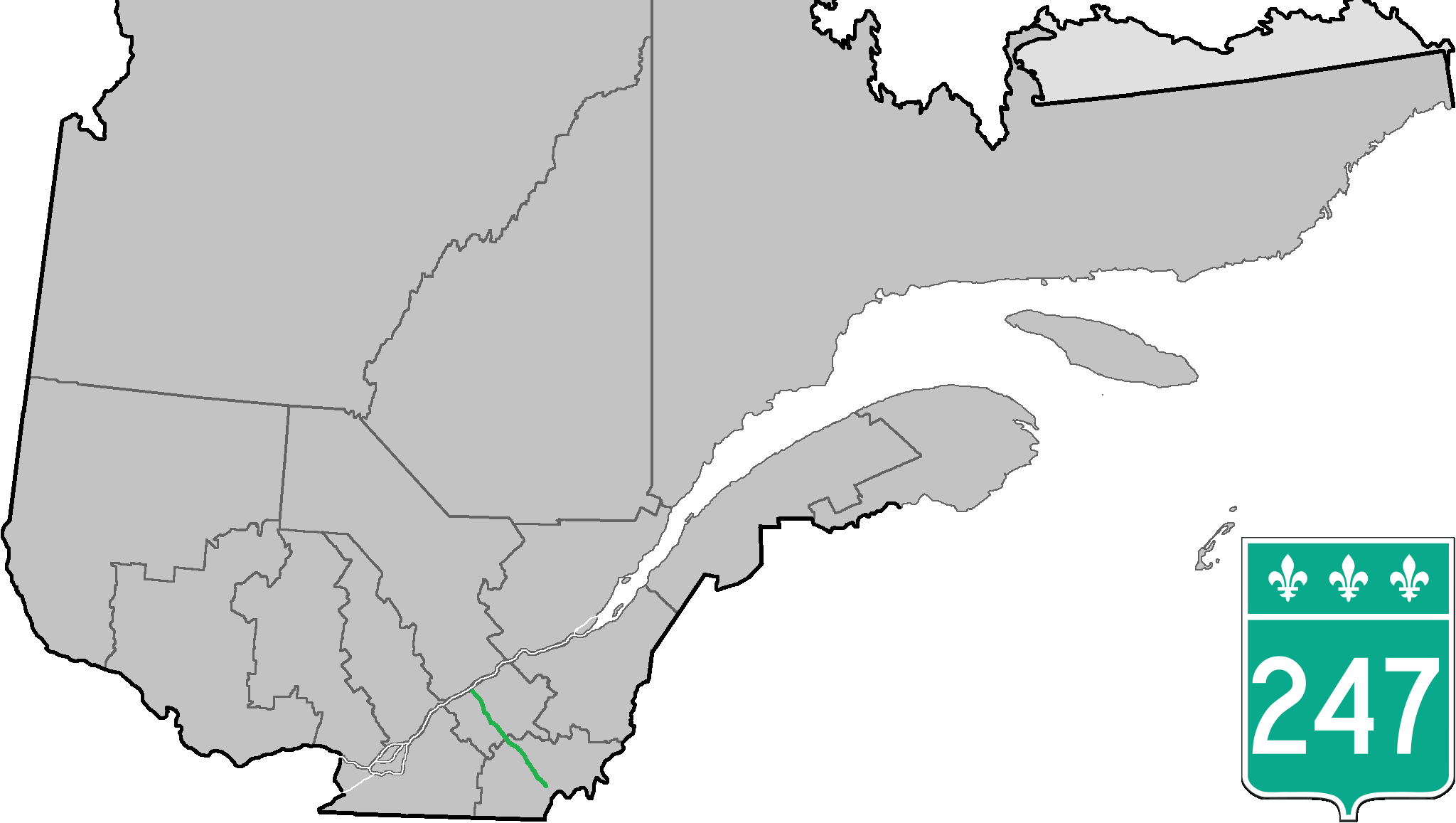

Route information
- Length: 129 km (80 mi)

Major junctions
- North end: R-132 near Baie-du-Febvre
- A-20 (TCH) / A-55 / R-122 in Saint-Cyrille-de-Wendover; R-116 in Danville; R-112 in Bishopton; R-108 in Bury
- South end: R-214 near Bury

Location
- Country: Canada
- Province: Quebec
- Major cities: Val-des-Sources

Highway system
- Quebec provincial highways; Autoroutes; List; Former
← R-253	→ R-257

Route 255 is a north–south highway on the south shore of the St. Lawrence River. Its northern terminus is in Baie-du-Febvre at the junction of Route 132 and its southern terminus is in Bury at the junction of Quebec Route 214.

== List of towns along Route 255 ==
- Baie-du-Febvre
- Saint-Zephirin-de-Courval
- Saint-Joachim-de-Courval
- Saint-Cyrille-de-Wendover
- Saint-Lucien
- Saint-Felix-de-Kingsey
- Danville
- Val-des-Sources
- Wotton
- Sainte-Camille
- Bishopton
- Bury
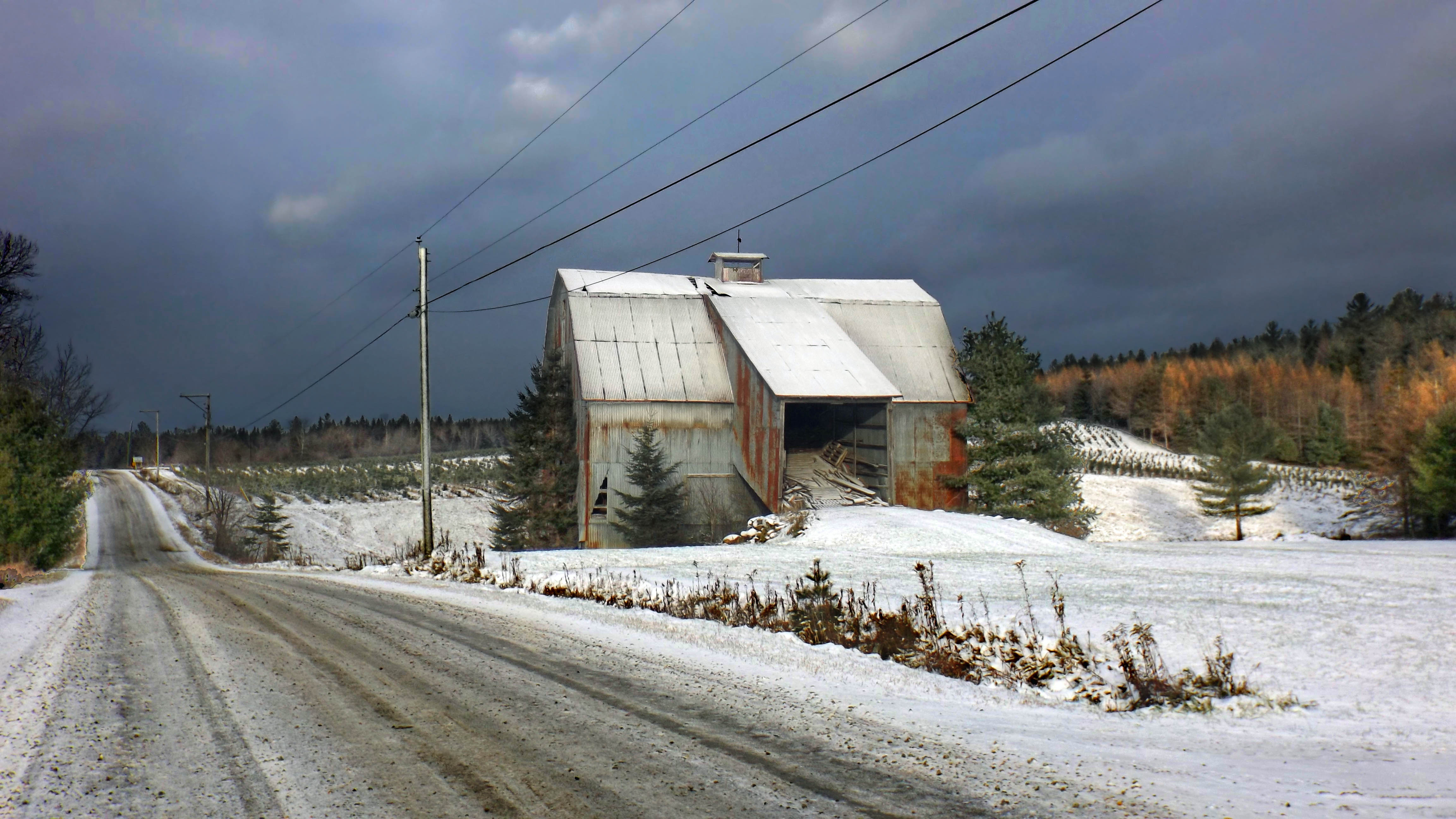
Gravel section of Route 255 in Bury.

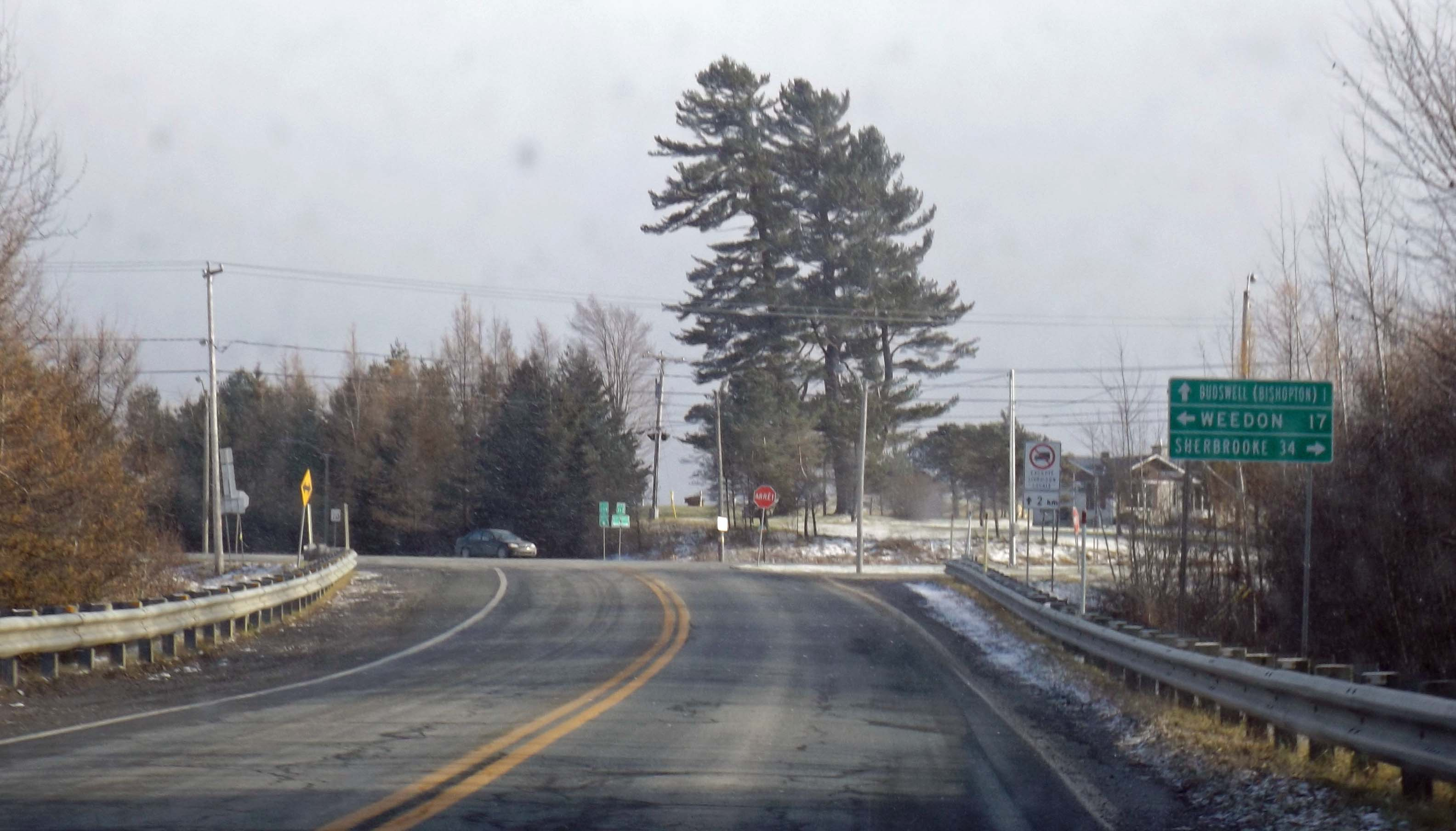
Intersection of Routes 112 and 253 in Dudswell.

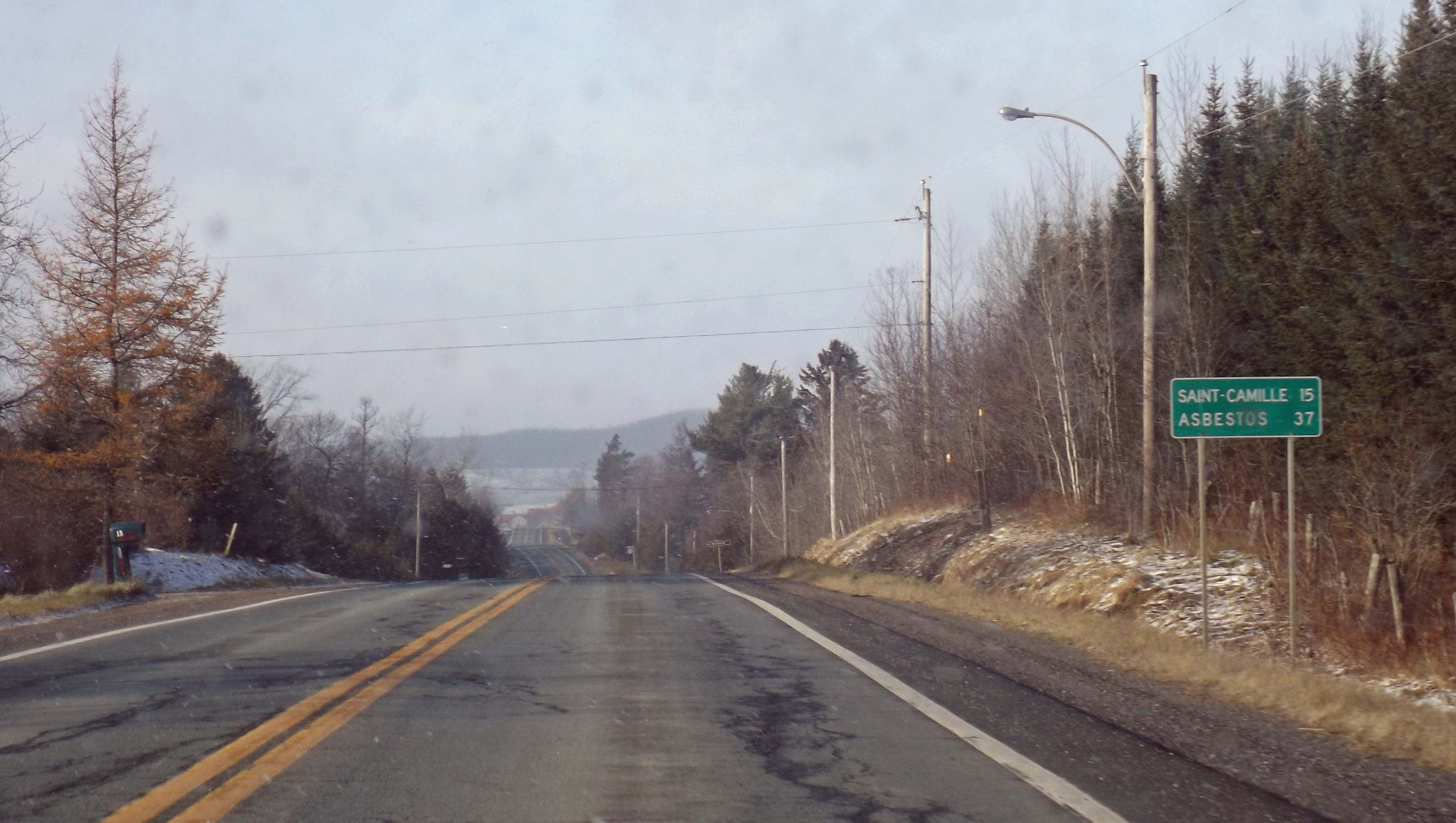
Route 255 towards Val-des-Sources in Dudswell.

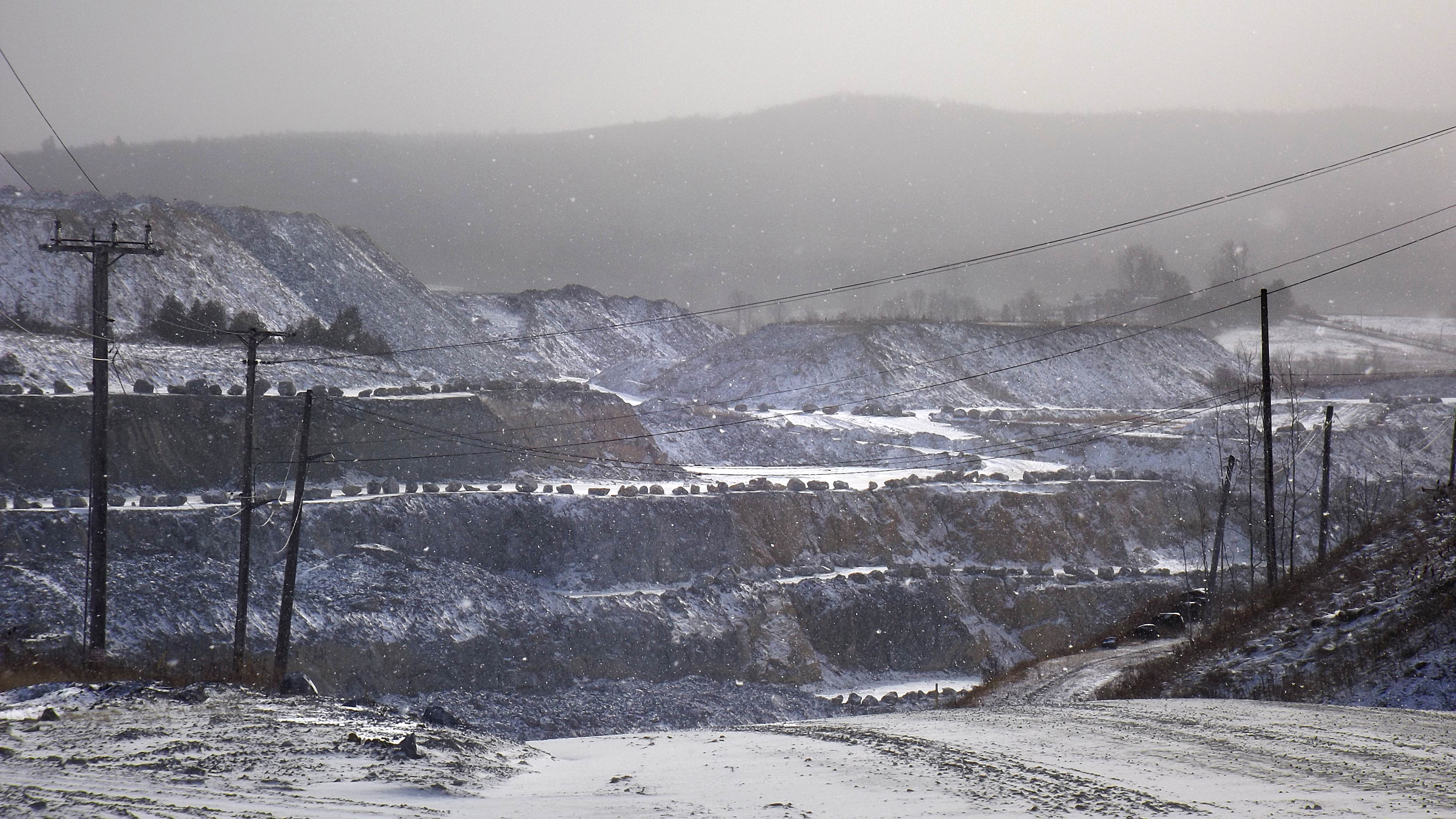
Route 255 crosses Dudswell and Asbestos mines.

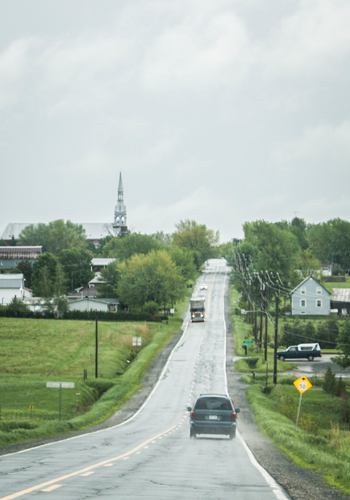
Route 255 approaching Wotton.

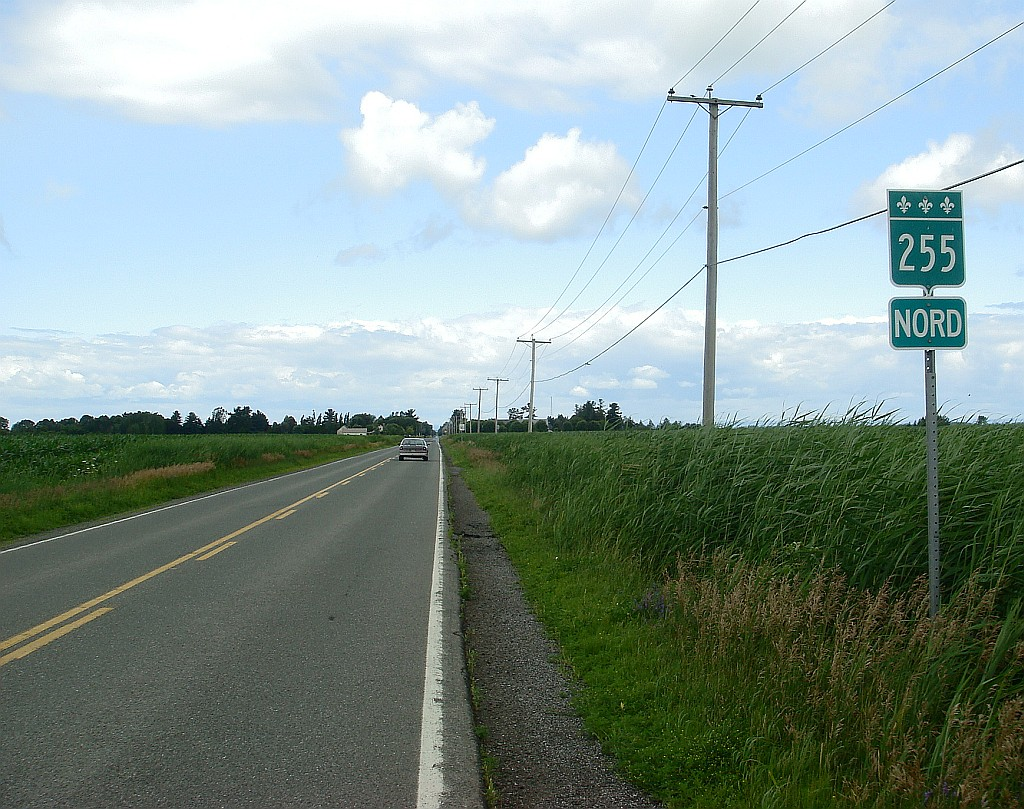
Route 255 as viewed northbound near Baie-du-Febvre, Quebec.

== See also ==
- List of Quebec provincial highways
