= Watopeka River =

River in Estrie, Quebec (Canada)

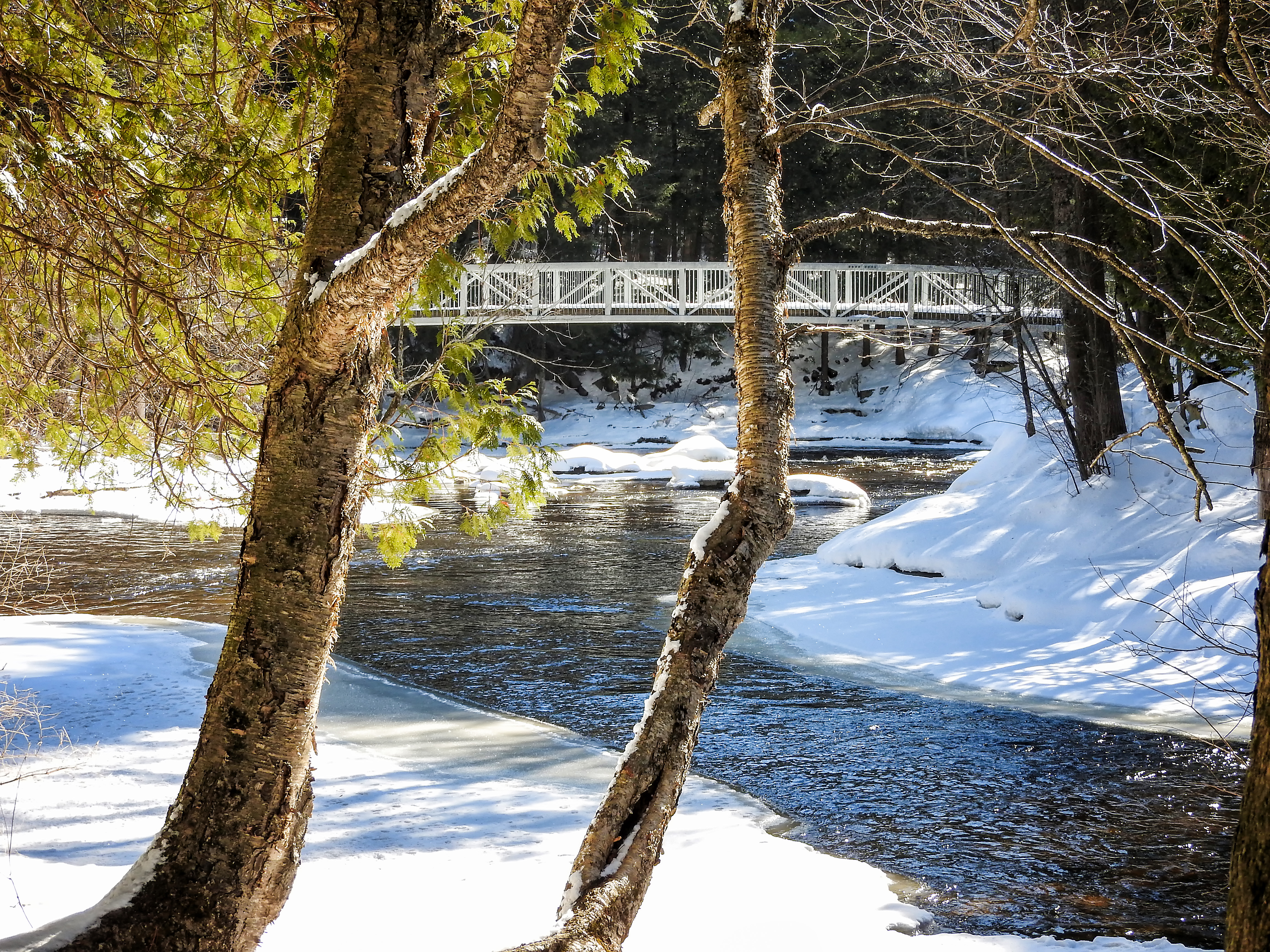
- Watopeka River
- Native name: Rivière Watopeka (French)

Location
- Country: Canada
- Province: Quebec
- Region: Chaudière-Appalaches
- MRC: Le Haut-Saint-François Regional County Municipality, Les Sources Regional County Municipality, Le Val-Saint-François Regional County Municipality
- Municipality: Dudswell and Saint-Camille, Stoke, Saint-Georges-de-Windsor, Val-Joli and Windsor

Physical characteristics
- Source: Lake Watopeka
  - location: Dudswell
  - coordinates: 45.63890°N 71.76140°W
  - elevation: 303 m (994 ft)
- Mouth: Saint-François River
  - location: Windsor
  - coordinates: 45.56333°N 72.00555°W
  - elevation: 264 m (866 ft)
- Length: 26.7 km (16.6 mi)

Basin features
- Progression: Saint-François River, St. Lawrence River
- Tributaries
  - left: (upstream)
  - right: (upstream) Décharge du lac Saint-Georges.

The Watopeka river (in French: rivière Watopeka) is a tributary of the Saint-François River, in the administrative region of Estrie, on the South Shore of St. Lawrence River, in Quebec, Canada. The course of the Watopeka river successively crosses the territories of the municipalities of:

- Le Haut-Saint-François Regional County Municipality (MRC): municipality of Dudswell;
- Les Sources Regional County Municipality (MRC): Saint-Camille;
- Le Val-Saint-François Regional County Municipality (MRC): municipalities of Stoke, Saint-Georges-de-Windsor, Val-Joli and Windsor.

== Geography ==
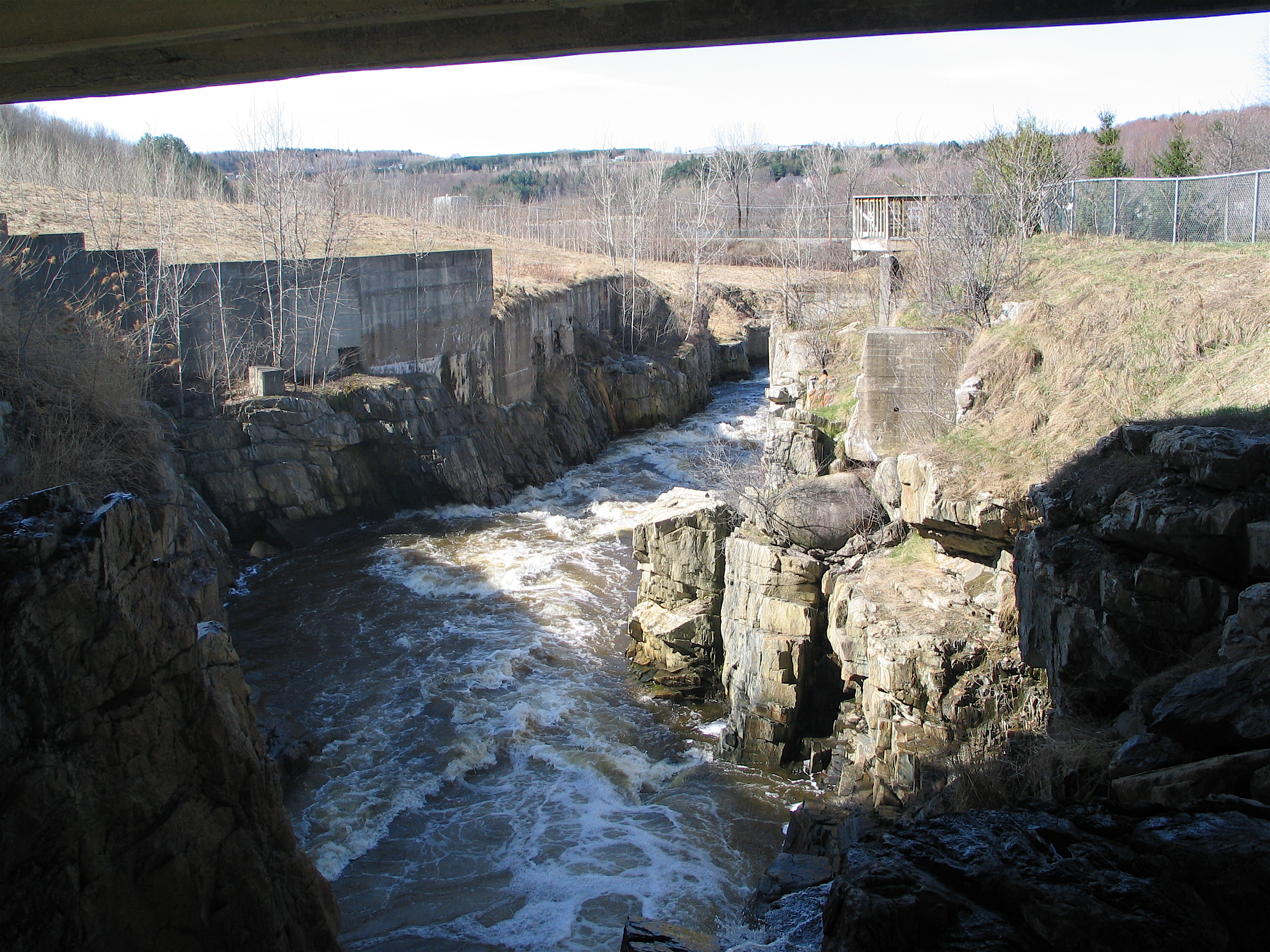
The river flowing under route 143.

The main neighboring hydrographic slopes of the Watopeka River are:

- north side: Rivière Nicolet Sud-Ouest;
- east side: Saint-François River;
- south side: Stoke River;
- west side: Saint-François River.

The Watopeka river has its source in the lake of the same name. This lake is located in the municipality of Dudswell, almost at the limit of the municipalities of Saint-Camille and Stoke.

Upper course of the river (segment of 21.2 kilometres (13.2 mi))

From Watopeka Lake, the Watopeka River flows over:

- 0.7 kilometres (0.43 mi) west in the municipality of Saint-Camille to the municipal limit;
- 7.4 kilometres (4.6 mi) winding west through the Municipality of Stoke, to the northwestern limit of the Municipality;
- 4.5 kilometres (2.8 mi) west, winding through the municipality of Saint-Georges-de-Windsor, to the east shore of an unidentified lake that the current crosses on 1.0 kilometre (0.62 mi); this lake receives the waters of the Bruneau stream;
- 0.2 kilometres (0.12 mi) westward, up to the municipal limit of Saint-Georges-de-Windsor and Saint-Claude;
- 3.2 kilometres (2.0 mi) southwesterly, in Saint-Claude, to a bay on the north shore of Lac Boissonneault, through which the current crosses on 7.6 kilometres (4.7 mi) towards West;
- 1.0 kilometre (0.62 mi) southwesterly, up to the municipal limit between Saint-Claude and Val-Joli;
- 4.2 kilometres (2.6 mi) southwesterly, in the municipality of Val-Joli, to the mouth of the Stoke River.

Lower course of the river (segment 5.5 kilometres (3.4 mi))

From the mouth of the Stoke River, the Watopeka River flows over:

- 1.4 kilometres (0.87 mi) up to the municipal boundary between Val-Joli and Windsor, i.e. up to the Charles dam;
- 4.1 kilometres (2.5 mi) towards the southwest, collecting the Péloquin stream, passing around Île Rouillard, crossing the La Poudrière dam, crossing the Poudrière rapids and the Watopeka dam, through the southern part of the city of Windsor.

The Stoke River empties on the east bank of the Saint-François River, in the southern part of the city of Windsor, 20 kilometres (12 mi) downstream from Sherbrooke which is located to the south-East.

== Toponymy ==
This toponym derives from the Abenaki word “Wdopikak” meaning “where alders are found”. According to the Commission de toponymie du Québec, some sources claim that Watopeka rather means “pearl river because of the rapids”. With the combined use of the English and French languages, the spelling and pronunciation of this Amerindianyme underwent several variations before the current form was formalized in the Place Names Bank.

The designation Ottopikak River, appears on a plan of the Township of Windsor from 1801. A French map of the County of Richmond from 1931, refers to the form Wattopekan River. Other documents from various periods use variant spellings, notably Watopéca, Wattopeka, Wattopekah, Wattopekak, Wattopikaw. This watercourse has also been designated with the names: Le Grand Ruisseau and The Brook.

The toponym Watopeka River was officially registered on December 5, 1968, at the Commission de toponymie du Québec.

== Gallery ==
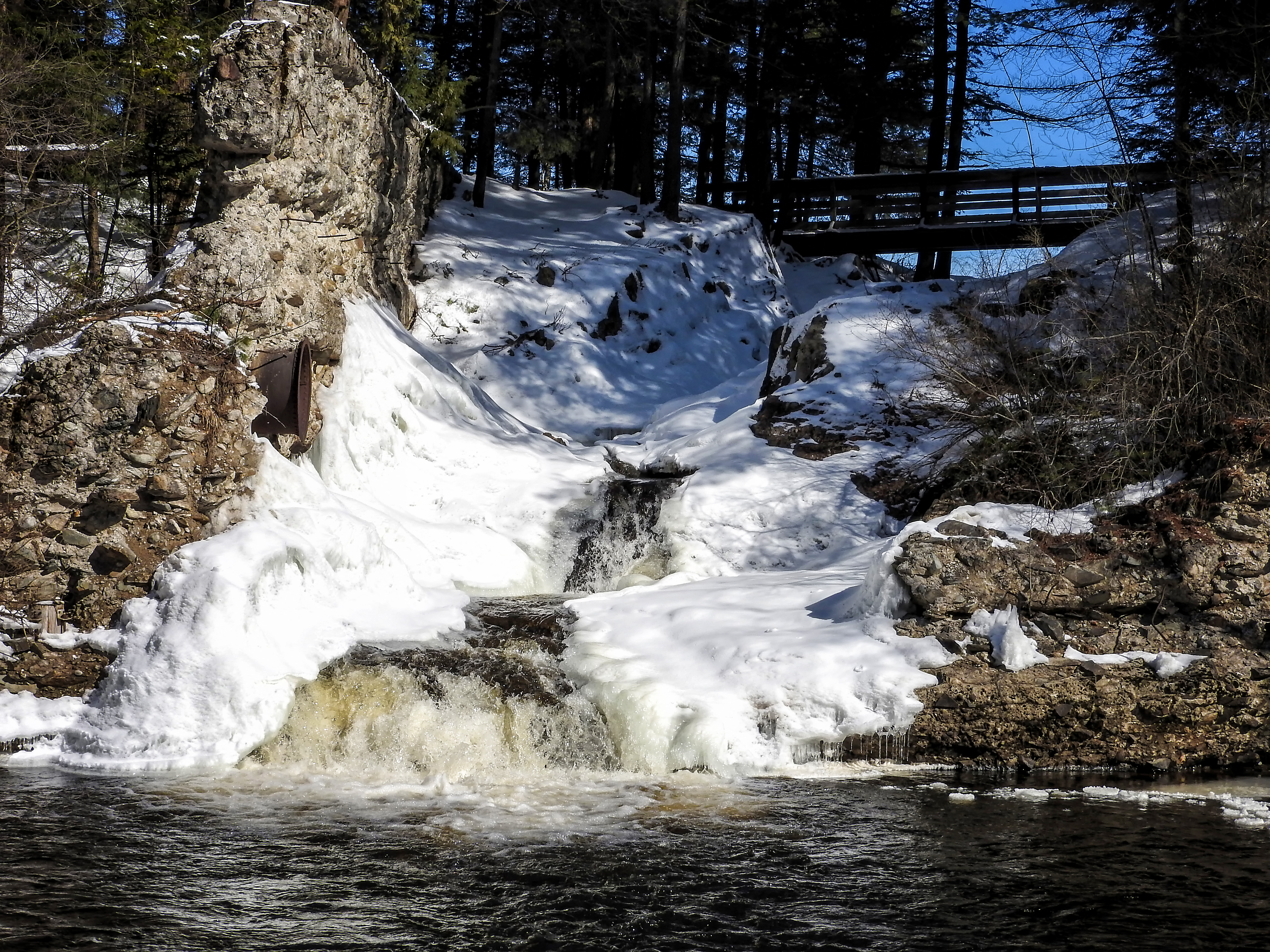

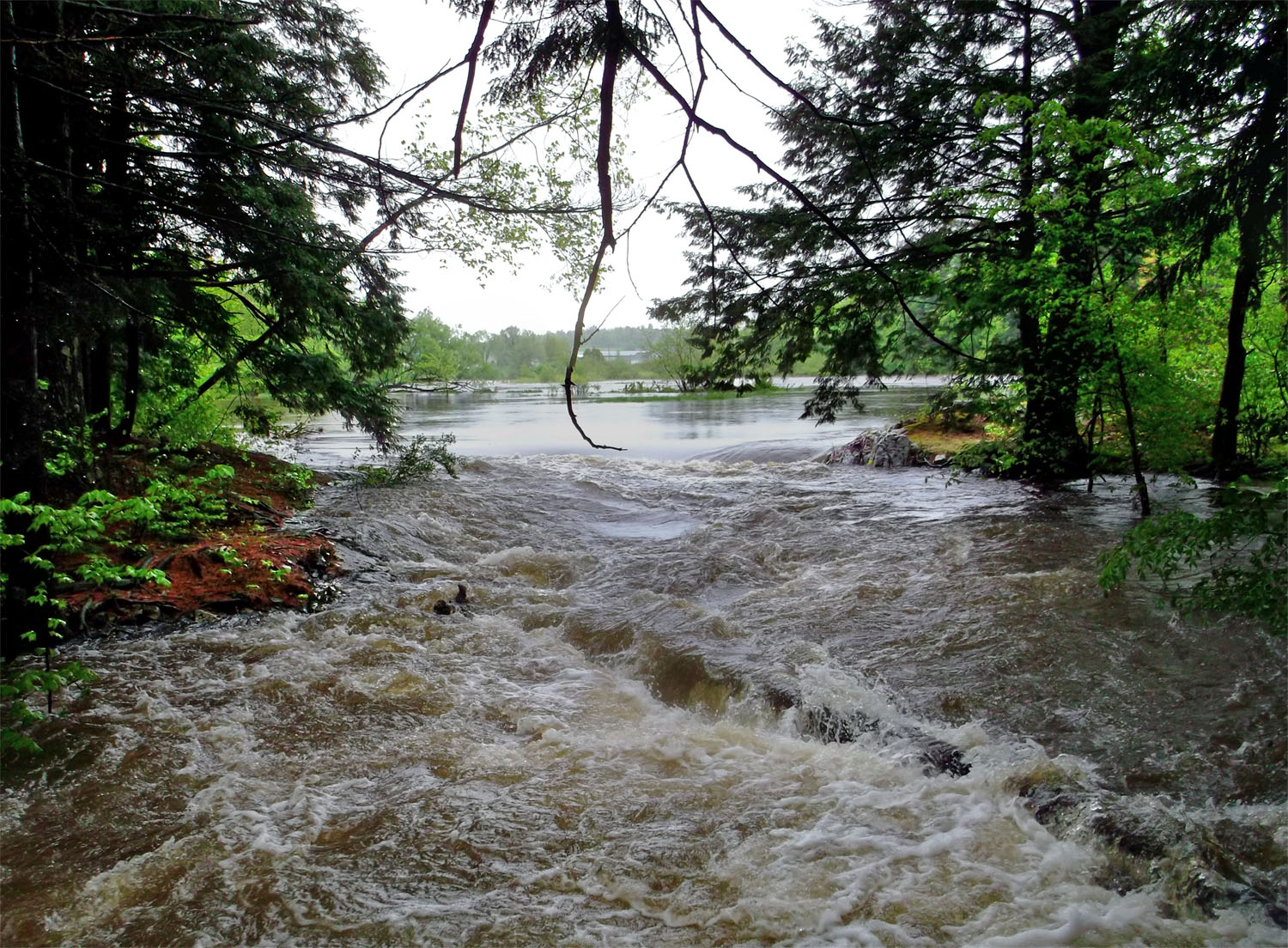

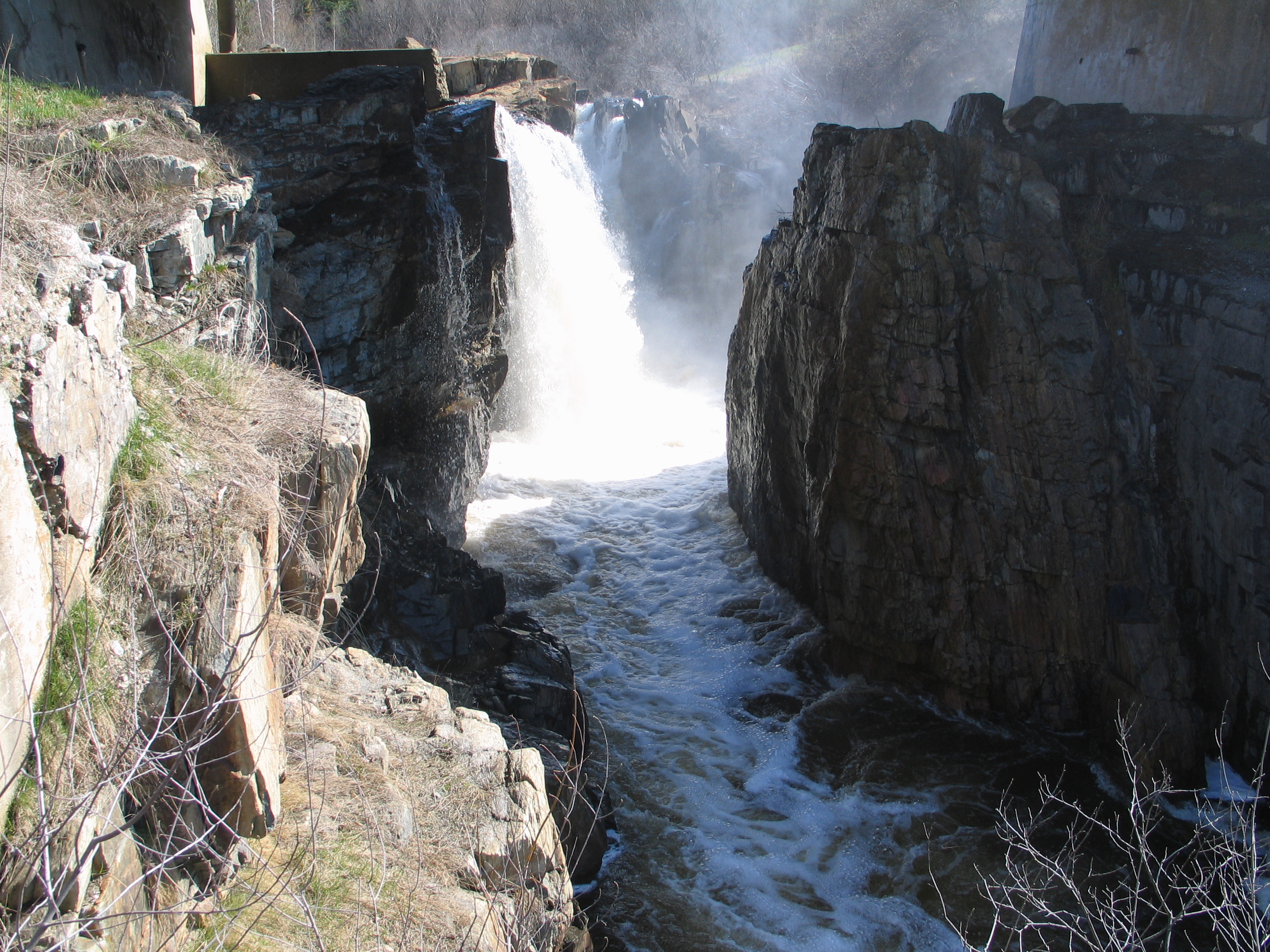

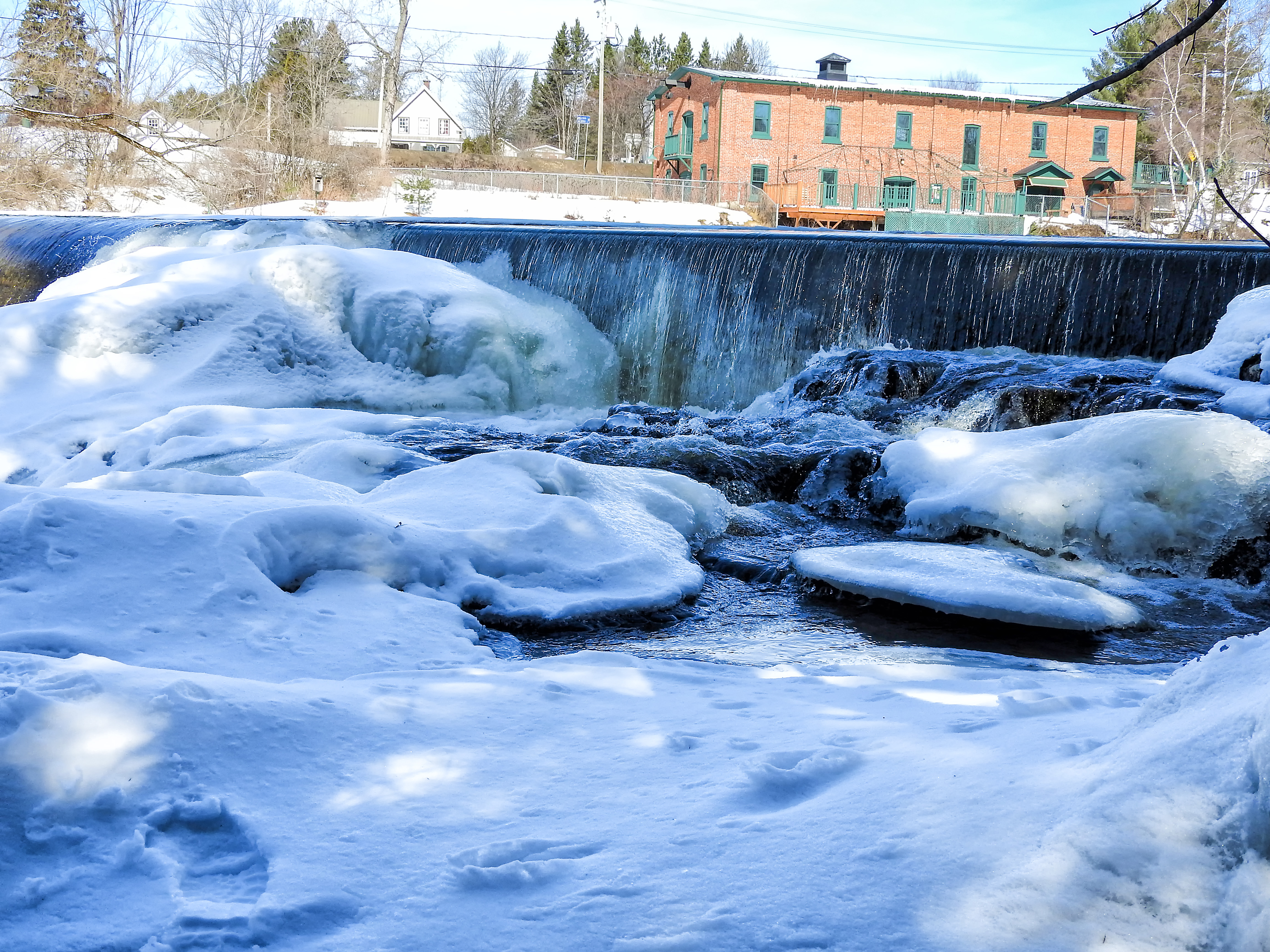

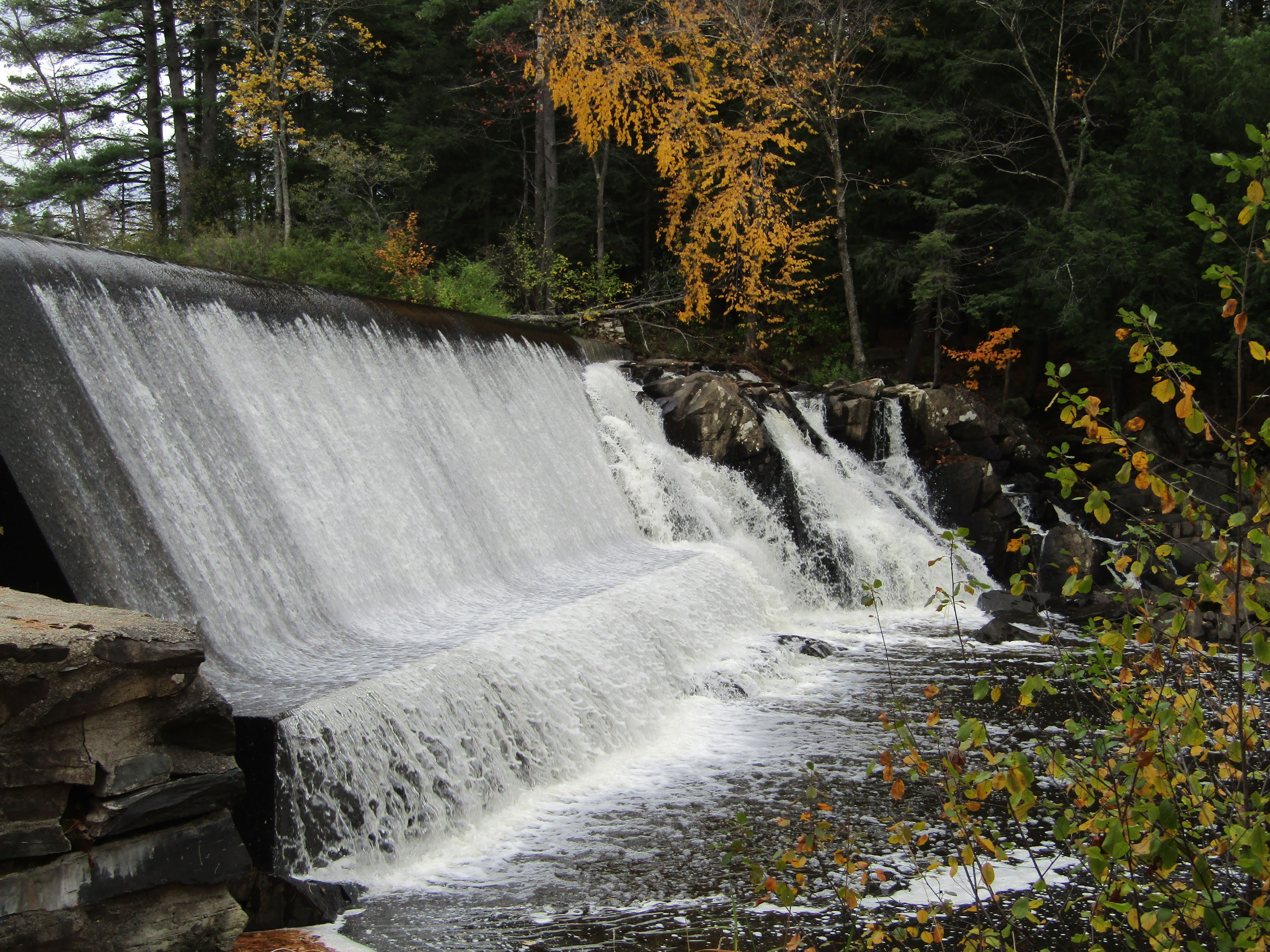
.

Click on images to enlarge

== See also ==
- List of rivers of Quebec
