= Stoke River =

River in Estrie, Quebec (Canada)

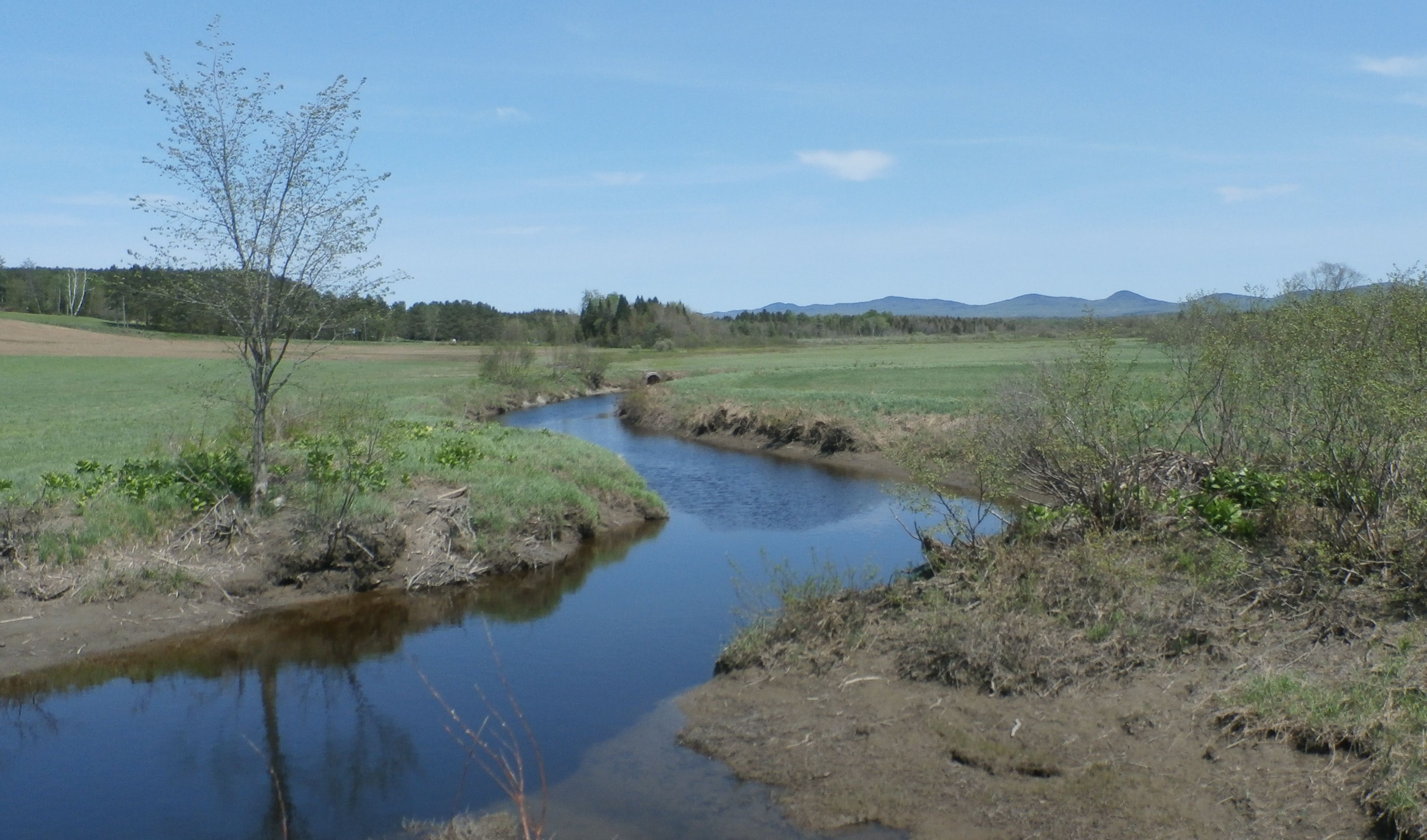
- Stoke River as seen from Carrier Road with the Stoke Mountains in the background.
- Native name: Rivière Stoke (French)

Location
- Country: Canada
- Province: Quebec
- Region: Chaudière-Appalaches
- MRC: Le Haut-Saint-François Regional County Municipality, Les Sources Regional County Municipality, Le Val-Saint-François Regional County Municipality
- Municipality: Dudswell and Saint-Camille, Stoke, Saint-Georges-de-Windsor, Val-Joli and Windsor

Physical characteristics
- Source: Brabant Lake
  - location: Dudswell
  - coordinates: 45.649528°N 71.63714°W
  - elevation: 426 m (1,398 ft)
- Mouth: Saint-François River
  - location: Windsor
  - coordinates: 45.57944°N 71.9625°W
  - elevation: 264 m (866 ft)
- Length: 36.1 km (22.4 mi)

Basin features
- Progression: Saint-François River, St. Lawrence River
- Tributaries
  - left: (upstream) ruisseau Godbout, décharge du Stoke Lake, ruisseau Guillemette, ruisseau Fréchette, ruisseau Conrad-Laroche, ruisseau Conrad-Laroche, ruisseau des Labrie, ruisseau à Brochu, ruisseau Goupil.
  - right: (upstream) ruisseau Péloquin, ruisseau Normandin, ruisseau Auger, Deuxième ruisseau, ruisseau Têtu, ruisseau du Dix.

The Stoke river (in French: rivière Stoke) is a tributary of the Saint-François River, in the administrative region of Estrie, on the South Shore of the St. Lawrence River, in Quebec, Canada. The course of the Stoke River successively crosses the territories of the municipalities of:

- Le Haut-Saint-François Regional County Municipality: municipality of Dudswell;
- Le Val-Saint-François Regional County Municipality: municipalities of Stoke and Val-Joli.

== Geography ==
The main neighboring hydrographic slopes of the Stoke River are:

- north side: Watopeka River, lac Boissonneault;
- east side: Watopeka River;
- south side: Saint-François River;
- west side: Saint-François River.

Brabant Lake (elevation: 426 metres (1,398 ft)) constitutes the head lake of the Stoke River. This lake is located in the municipality of Dudswell, north-west of the village of "Saint-Adolphe-de-Dudswell" and Lac d'Argent in the Le Haut-Saint-François Regional County Municipality, as well as east of Saint-Camille (MRC of Asbestos).

From Brabant Lake, the Stoke River flows over:

- 0.9 kilometres (0.56 mi) to the south;
- 2.9 kilometres (1.8 mi) southwest, to route 255;
- 5.8 kilometres (3.6 mi) southwesterly, up to the municipal boundary between Dudswell and Stoke;
- 13.5 kilometres (8.4 mi) southwesterly, along route 216 and passing through the hamlet of Duplin, to the bridge located east of village of Stoke;
- 1.3 kilometres (0.81 mi) southwesterly, passing northwest of the village of Stoke, to the outlet of Stoke Lake (coming from the south);
- 11.7 kilometres (7.3 mi) (or 5.8 kilometres (3.6 mi) in a direct line) towards the west, comprising several serpentines, and passing between the mountains "Le dos de cheval" and "Mont-Carrier ", and collecting the waters of the Godbout stream (coming from the south-west), up to its confluence with the Watopeka River.

The Stoke River empties on the east bank of the Watopeka River.

== Toponymy ==
The toponym "Rivière Stoke" was officially registered on December 5, 1968, at the Commission de toponymie du Québec.

== See also ==
- List of rivers of Quebec
