= Danville River =

River in Estrie, Quebec (Canada)

- Native name: Rivière Danville (French)

Location
- Country: Canada
- Province: Quebec
- Region: Estrie
- MRC: Nicolet-Yamaska Regional County Municipality
- Municipality: Saint-Georges-de-Windsor, Saint-Claude, Danville

Physical characteristics
- Source: Lévesque Dam
  - location: Saint-Georges-de-Windsor
  - coordinates: 45.6794969°N 71.925661°W
  - elevation: 265 m (869 ft)
- Mouth: Landry River
  - location: Sainte-Perpétue
  - coordinates: 46.12729°N 72.6156°W
  - elevation: 45 m (148 ft)
- Length: 15.5 km (9.6 mi)

Basin features
- Progression: Nicolet Southwest River, Nicolet River, St. Lawrence River
- Tributaries
  - left: (upstream) cours d'eau Mayette, cours d'eau Pinard, ruisseau Lacroix
  - right: (upstream) ruisseau Fortier, cours d'eau Jean

The Danville River (in French: rivière Danville) is a tributary of the east bank of the Landry River whose current flows successively into the Nicolet Southwest River, Nicolet River, Lake Saint-Pierre and St. Lawrence River. It crosses the municipalities of Saint-Georges-de-Windsor, Saint-Claude and Danville in the Les Sources Regional County Municipality (MRC), in the administrative region of Estrie, in Quebec, in Canada.

== Geography ==
The main neighboring hydrographic slopes of the Danville River are:

- north side: Nicolet River;
- east side: Nicolet Southwest River, Watopeka River;
- south side: Steele brook, Willow brook, Saint-François River;
- west side: Landry River.

The Danville river has its source at the Lévesque dam in the municipality of Saint-Georges-de-Windsor. This dam retains a body of water 1.4 kilometres (0.87 mi) in length forming a loop to the south. This body of water is fed by the Jean stream (coming from the north). This dam is located 5.3 kilometres (3.3 mi) north of the center of the village of Saint-Claude, 5.4 kilometres (3.4 mi) to the west from the center of the village of Saint-Georges-de-Windsor and south of the village of Asbestos.

From the Lévesque dam, the Danville River flows over 15.5 kilometres (9.6 mi) in the following segments:

- 4.5 kilometres (2.8 mi) towards the north-west, making an incursion on 1.1 kilometres (0.68 mi) in the municipality of Saint-Claude, until the limit of the municipality of Danville (i.e. the sector of the former municipality of Shipton);
- 11.0 kilometres (6.8 mi) northwesterly, into Danville, passing south of the town of Val-des-Sources, crossing route 116, to its mouth.

The Danville River empties on the east bank of the Landry River. Its confluence is located at:

- 2.3 kilometres (1.4 mi) (direct line) south of the intersection of route 116 and route 255 of the village of Danville;
- 5.5 kilometres (3.4 mi) (or 2.0 kilometres (1.2 mi) in a direct line) upstream of the confluence of the Landry River.

== Toponymy ==
The toponym rivière Danville was made official on December 5, 1968, at the Commission de toponymie du Québec.

== See also ==
- List of rivers of Quebec
