= Landry River (Nicolet Southwest River tributary) =

River in Estrie, Quebec, Canada

- Native name: Rivière Landry (French)

Location
- Country: Canada
- Province: Quebec
- Region: Estrie
- MRC: Le Val-Saint-François Regional County Municipality, Les Sources Regional County Municipality
- Municipality: Cleveland, Danville

Physical characteristics
- Source: Confluence of mountain streams
  - location: Cleveland
  - coordinates: 45.681141°N 72.090217°W
  - elevation: 149 m (489 ft)
- Mouth: Nicolet Southwest River
  - location: Danville
  - coordinates: 45.80361°N 72.02528°W
  - elevation: 118 m (387 ft)
- Length: 17.2 km (10.7 mi)

Basin features
- Progression: Nicolet Southwest River, Nicolet River, St. Lawrence River
- Tributaries
  - left: (upstream) cours d'eau Blais
  - right: (upstream) ruisseau Burbank, Danville River

The Landry River (in French: rivière Landry) is a tributary on the south shore of the Nicolet Southwest River. It crosses the municipalities of Cleveland (MRC Le Val-Saint-François Regional County Municipality) and Danville (MRC Les Sources Regional County Municipality), in the administrative region of Estrie, in Quebec, in Canada.

== Geography ==
The main neighboring hydrographic slopes of the Landry River are:

- north side: Nicolet Southest River;
- east side: Nicolet Southwest River, Danville River;
- south side: Saint-François River, Steele stream;
- west side: Saint-François River.

The Landry River originates from various streams in the "Greenshields" sector of the "Smith Mountains" in the Municipality of Cleveland. The valley path runs along (on the west side) the Landry river.

From the confluence of mountain streams, the Landry River flows over:

- 2.5 kilometres (1.6 mi) northeasterly, in the township municipality of Cleveland, to the intermunicipal limit of Danville (either the area of the former municipality of Shipton);
- 6.1 kilometres (3.8 mi) north, crossing route 116, to the confluence of Danville River;
- 3.1 kilometres (1.9 mi) (or 4.8 kilometres (3.0 mi) in a direct line) north, meandering to the confluence of Burbank Creek (coming from the east and draining the Burbank Pond);
- 5.5 kilometres (3.4 mi) (or 2.0 kilometres (1.2 mi) in a direct line) north, winding west of the village of Danville, until its mouth.

The Landry River empties on the south bank of the Nicolet Southwest River, at 2.9 kilometres (1.8 mi) (or 1.2 kilometres (0.75 mi) in a direct line) downstream of the bridge from route 116 and at 1.8 kilometres (1.1 mi) north of the intersection of roads 116 and 255 in the heart of the village of Danville.

== Toponymy ==
The term "Landry" constitutes a family name of French origin.

The toponym "Rivière Landry" was made official on December 5, 1968, at the Commission de toponymie du Québec.

== See also ==
- Lake Saint-Pierre
- List of rivers of Quebec
