= Stoke Lake =

Lake in Quebec, Canada

- Lac Stoke (French)
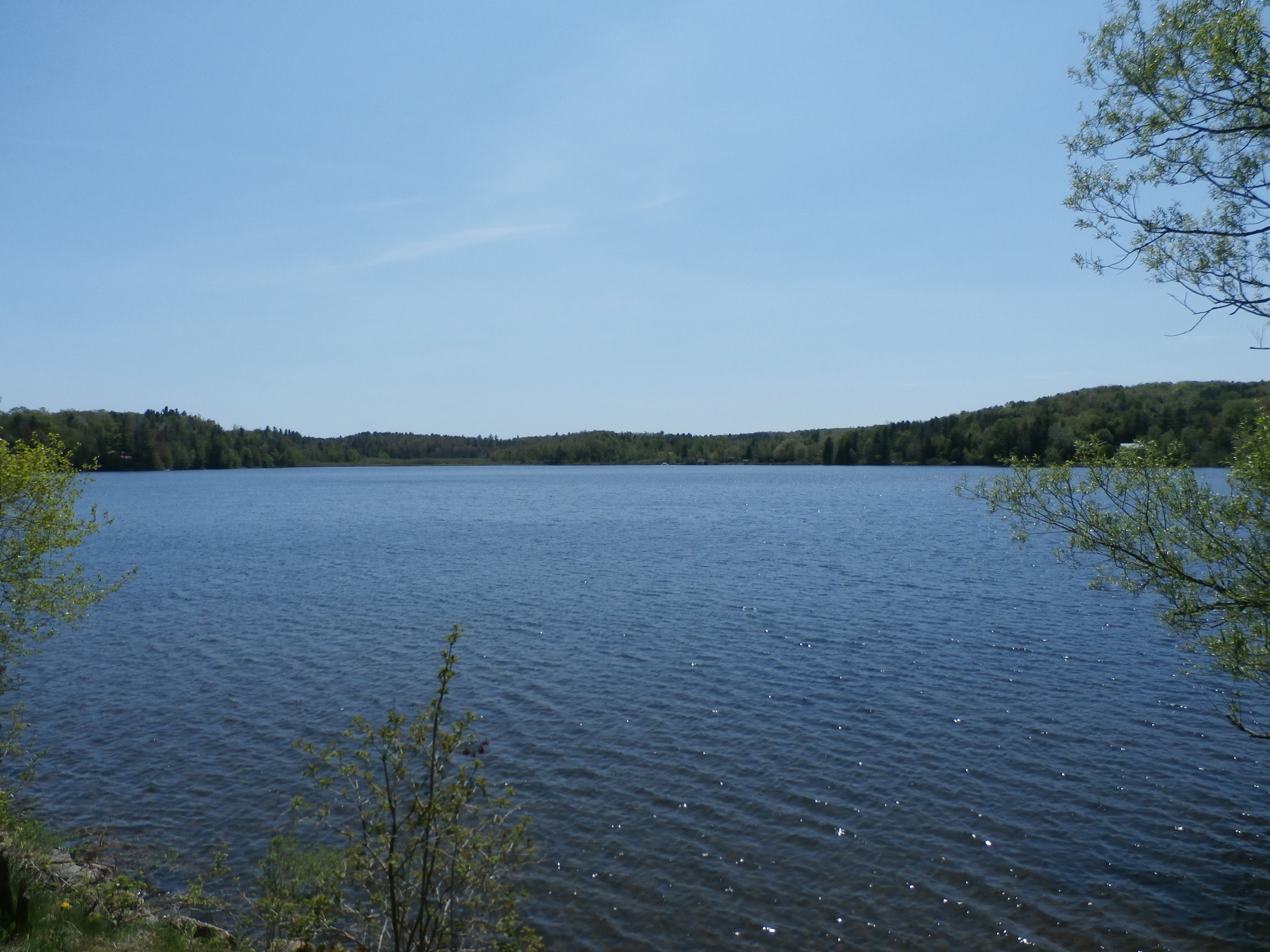
- Stoke Lake seen from the north.

- Location within Quebec
- Coordinates: 45.516379°N 71.808967°W
- Primary inflows: ruisseau Beauchêne
- Primary outflows: Stoke River (via discharge of the lake)
- Catchment area: 7.8 kilometres (4.85 mi)
- Basin countries: Estrie, Quebec, Canada
- Max. length: 1.0 kilometre (0.62 mi)
- Max. width: 0.5 kilometres (0.31 mi)
- Average depth: 5.5 metres (18 ft)
- Max. depth: 12.4 metres (41 ft)
- Shore length^{1}: 2.6 kilometres (1.6 mi)
- Surface elevation: 211.9 metres (695 ft)
- ^{1} Shore length is not a well-defined measure.

The lake Stoke (in French: lac Stoke) is the source of Stoke River. This lake is located south of the municipality of Stoke in the Le Val-Saint-François Regional County Municipality (MRC), in administrative region of Estrie, in Quebec, Canada.

== Geography ==
Stoke Lake has an area of 0.39 kilometres (0.24 mi), a maximum depth of 12.4 metres (41 ft), a catchment area of 7.8 kilometres (4.85 mi) and a perimeter of 2.6 kilometres (1.6 mi). It is fed mainly by the Beauchêne stream. The outlet of the lake joins the Stoke River. The bacteriological rating of the lake is A, that is to say excellent according to the Ministry of Sustainable Development. It is bordered by route 216 and Chemin du Lac.
