= Mont Chapman =

Mountain in Quebec, Canada

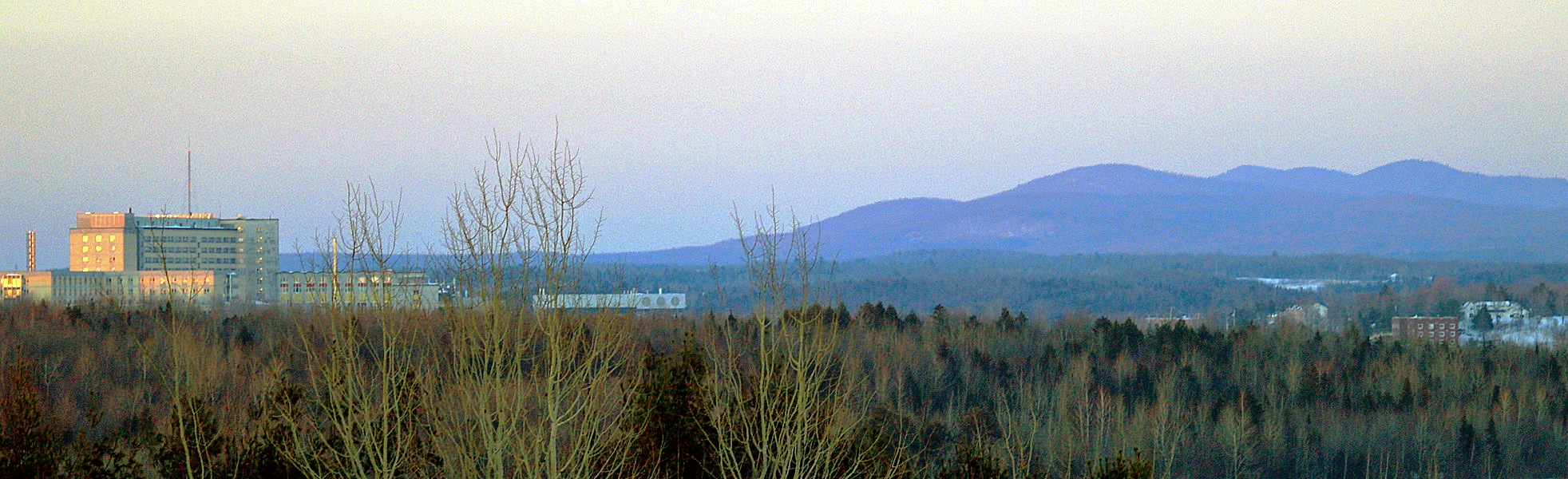
- The Stoke Mountains as seen from the Sherbrooke city limits in Fleurimont.

Highest point
- Elevation: 658 m (2,159 ft)
- Prominence: 308 m (1,010 ft)
- Coordinates: 45°34′29″N 71°40′42″W

Geography
- Location within Southern Quebec
- Location: Quebec, Canada
- Parent range: Southern Notre Dame Mountains

Climbing
- Easiest route: hiking via 14e Rang Est in Stoke, QC

Mont Chapman (elevation 658 metres (2,159 ft)) is the highest peak in the Stoke Mountains of the southern Notre Dame mountain range located in Stoke, Quebec, Canada. It is accessible from trails maintained by Les Sentiers de l'Estrie. From the summit, one is able to see Mont Ham, Mont Ste-Cécile, and Mont Mégantic. Neighboring Bald Peak (elevation approx. 611 metres (2,005 ft), 45°34′17″N 71°40′47″W) is accessible by these same trails.
