= Quebec Route 249 =

Highway in Quebec, Canada

Route 249

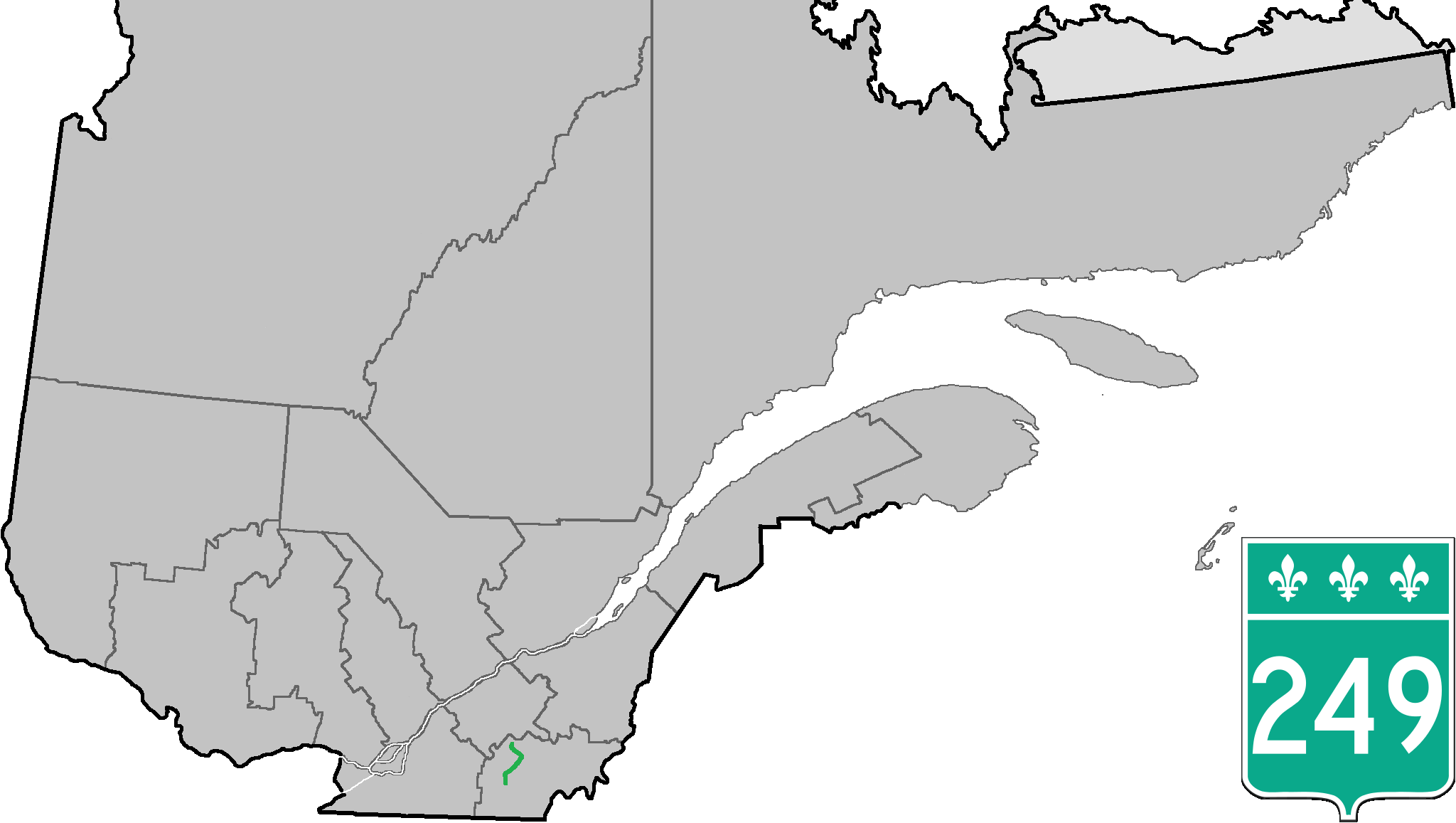

Route information
- Maintained by Transports Québec
- Length: 68.8 km (42.8 mi)

Major junctions
- South end: R-112 in Magog (Omerville)
- R-220 in Sherbrooke; R-222 in Saint-Denis-de-Brompton; A-55 / R-143 in Windsor
- North end: R-255 in Val-des-Sources

Location
- Country: Canada
- Province: Quebec
- Major cities: Magog, Sherbrooke, Val-des-Sources

Highway system
- Quebec provincial highways; Autoroutes; List; Former
← R-247	→ R-251

Route 249 is a two-lane north–south highway on the south shore of the Saint Lawrence River in Quebec, Canada. Its northern terminus is in Val-des-Sources at the junction of Route 255, and the southern terminus is at the junction of Route 112 close to Magog.

== Municipalities along Route 249 ==
- Magog
- Sherbrooke
- Saint-Denis-de-Brompton
- Saint-François-Xavier-de-Brompton, Quebec
- Windsor
- Val-Joli
- Saint-Claude
- Saint-Georges-de-Windsor
- Val-des-Sources
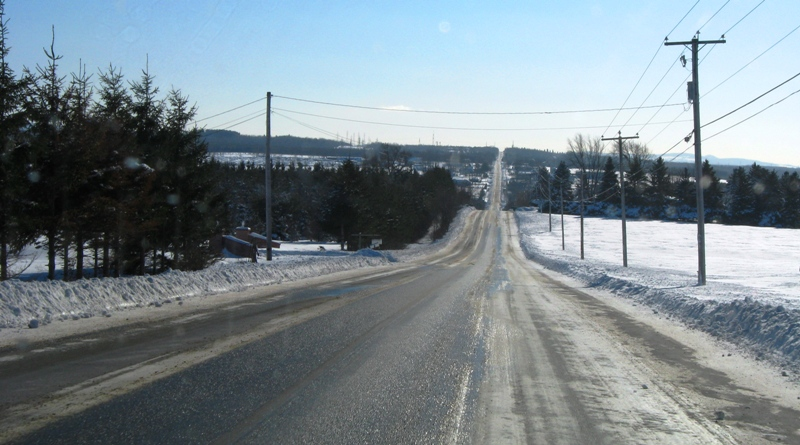
Rhéaume road south of Saint-Denis-de-Brompton.

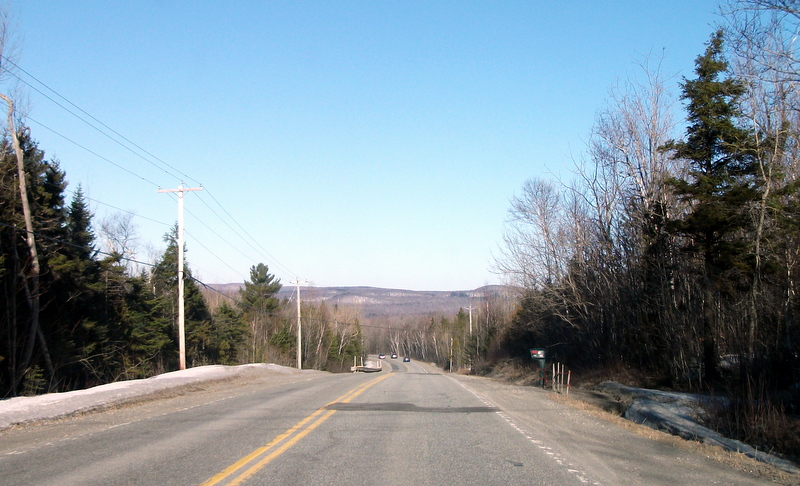
Route 249 shares part of its route with route 222.

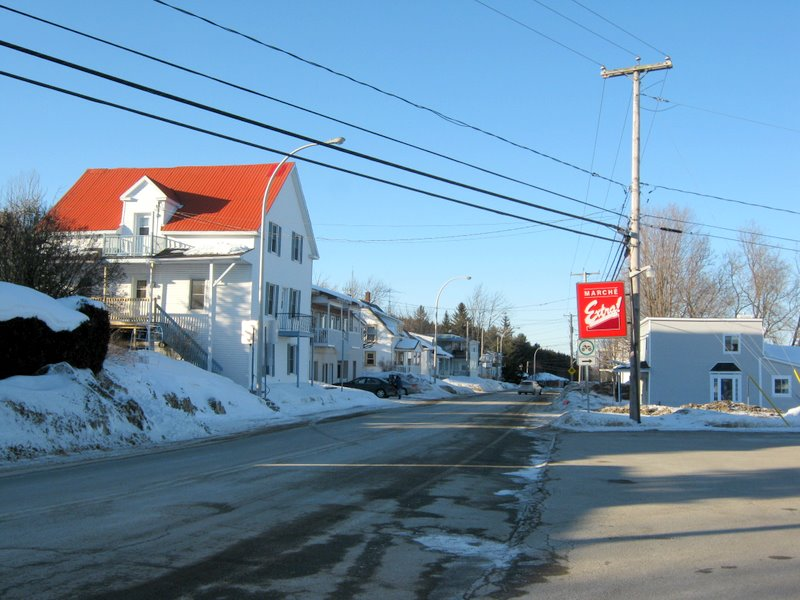
Principale street in Saint-François-Xavier-de-Brompton.

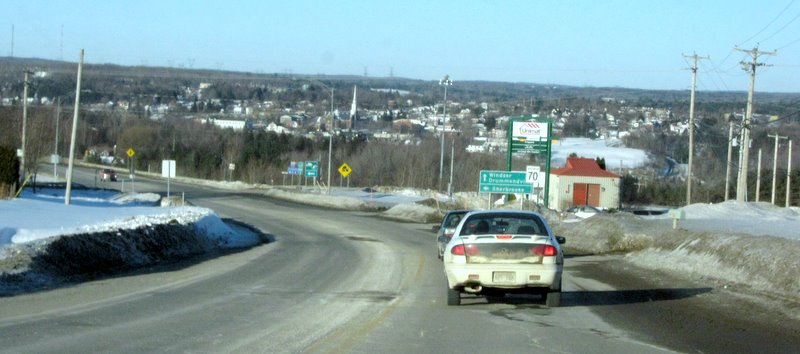
Route 249 descends in the valley of Saint-François River, near Windsor.

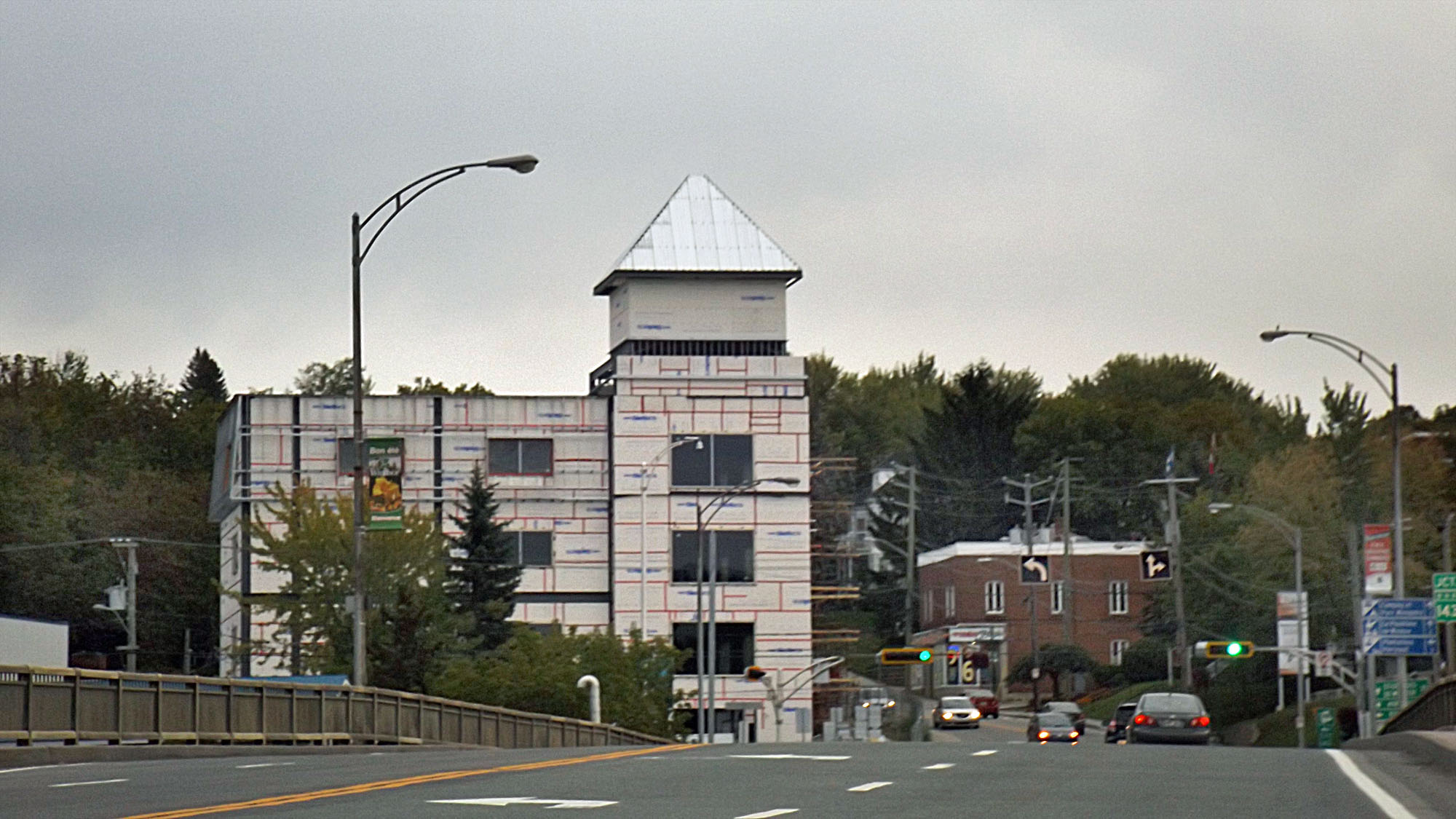
Bridge over the Saint-François in Windsor.

== See also ==
- List of Quebec provincial highways
