= Cleveland, Quebec =

Cleveland
- Township municipality
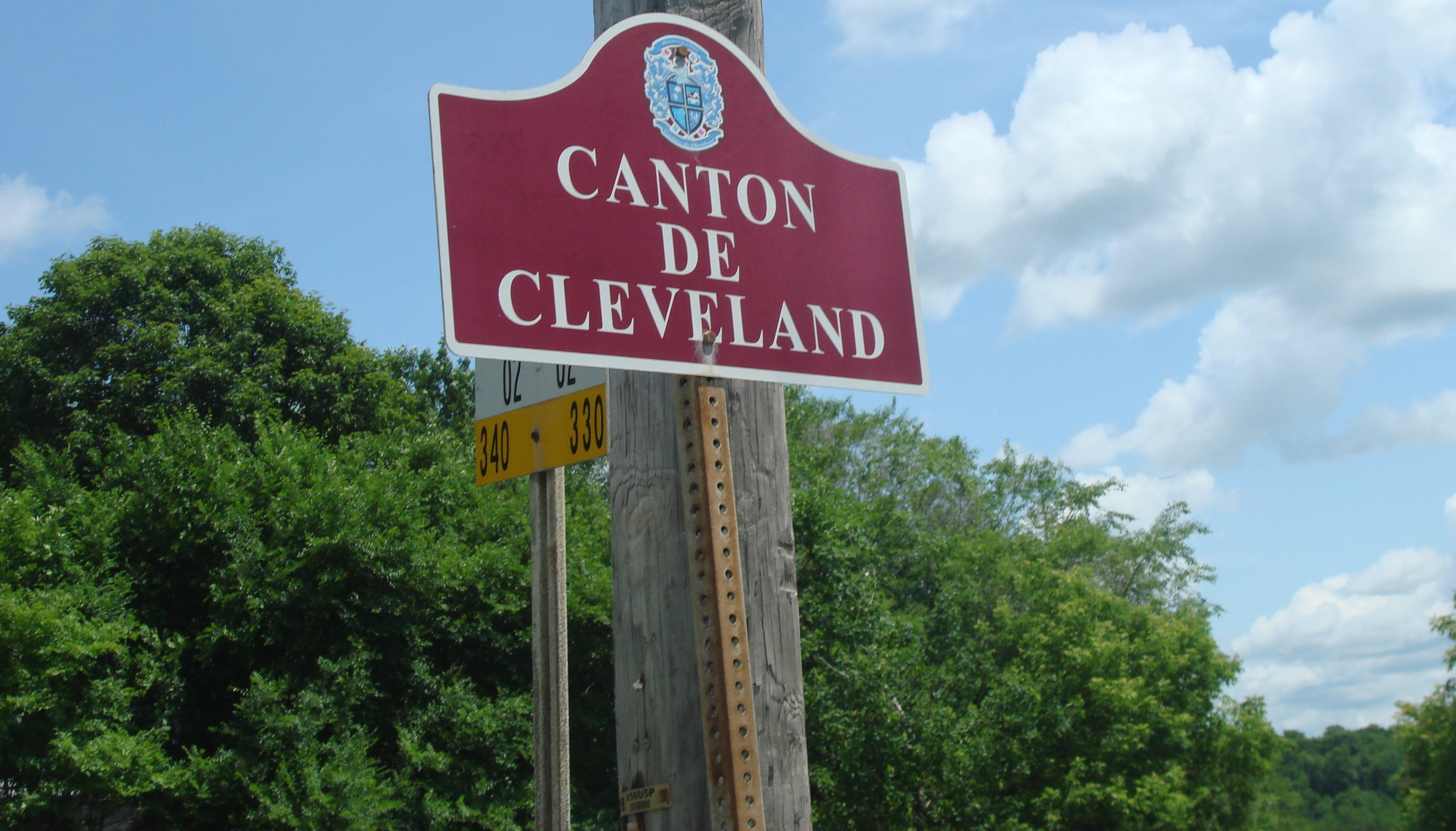

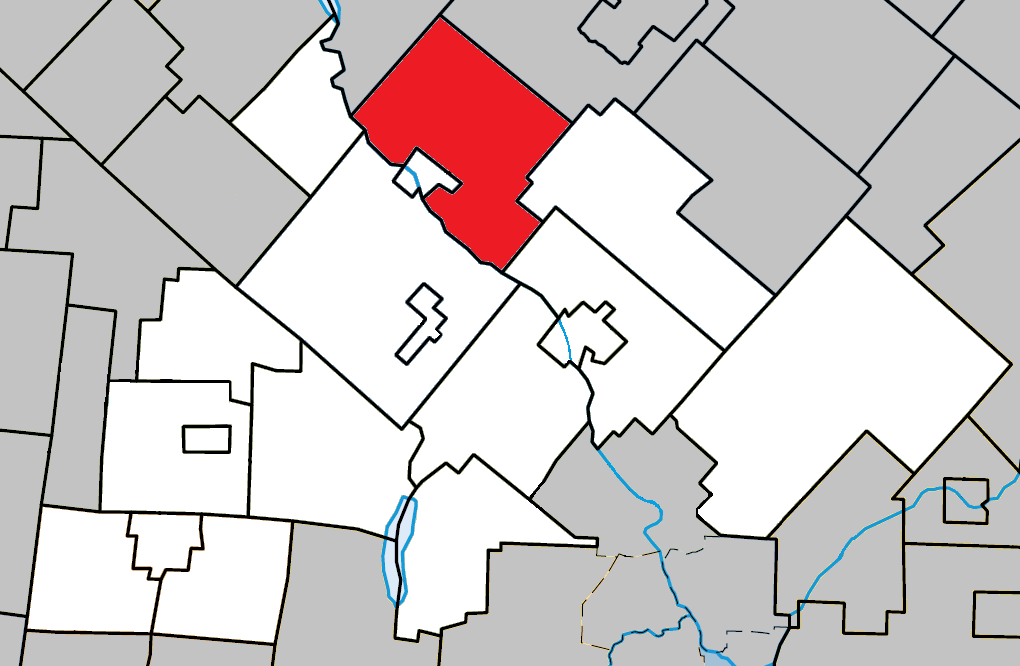
- Location within Le Val-Saint-François RCM

- Location in southern Quebec
- Coordinates: 45.67°N 72.08°W
- Country: Canada
- Province: Quebec
- Region: Estrie
- RCM: Le Val-Saint-François
- Constituted: July 1, 1855
- Named for: George Nelson Cleveland

Government
  - Mayor: Herman Herbers
  - Federal riding: Richmond—Arthabaska—des-Sources
  - Prov. riding: Richmond

Area
  - Total: 124.30 km^{2} (47.99 sq mi)
  - Land: 123.59 km^{2} (47.72 sq mi)

Population (2021)
  - Total: 1,581
  - Density: 12.8/km^{2} (33/sq mi)
  - Pop 2016-2021: ▲2.6%
  - Dwellings: 696
- Time zone: UTC−5 (EST)
  - Summer (DST): UTC−4 (EDT)
- Postal code(s): J0B 2H0
- Area code: 819
- Highways: R-116; R-143; R-243
- Website: www.cleveland.ca

Cleveland is a township of about 1,600 people in Le Val-Saint-François Regional County Municipality in the Estrie region of Quebec, Canada.

It was named after George Nelson Cleveland, the first mayor.

== Demographics ==
Historical Census Data - Cleveland, Quebec
| Year | Pop. | ±% |
|---|---|---|
| 1861 | 1,916 | — |
| 1871 | 1,398 | −27.0% |
| 1881 | 1,715 | +22.7% |
| 1891 | 1,249 | −27.2% |
| 1901 | 1,216 | −2.6% |
| 1911 | 1,130 | −7.1% |
| 1921 | 977 | −13.5% |
| 1931 | 951 | −2.7% |
| 1941 | 1,006 | +5.8% |
| 1951 | 1,115 | +10.8% |
| 1956 | 1,279 | +14.7% |
| 1961 | 1,299 | +1.6% |
| 1966 | 1,358 | +4.5% |
| 1971 | 1,468 | +8.1% |
| 1976 | 1,544 | +5.2% |
| 1981 | 1,728 | +11.9% |
| 1986 | 1,711 | −1.0% |
| 1991 | 1,609 | −6.0% |
| 1996 | 1,581 | −1.7% |
| 2001 | 1,564 | −1.1% |
| 2006 | 1,590 | +1.7% |
| 2011 | 1,609 | +1.2% |
| 2016 | 1,541 | −4.2% |
| 2021 | 1,581 | +2.6% |

In the 2021 Census of Population conducted by Statistics Canada, Cleveland had a population of 1,581 living in 588 of its 696 total private dwellings, a change of 2.6% from its 2016 population of 1,541. With a land area of 123.59 km^{2} (47.72 sq mi), it had a population density of 12.8/km^{2} (33.1/sq mi) in 2021.

Mother tongue (2021)

| Language | Population | Pct (%) |
|---|---|---|
| French only | 1,000 | 71.2% |
| English only | 355 | 25.3% |
| English and French | 35 | 2.5% |
| Non-official languages | 10 | 0.7% |

== See also ==
- List of anglophone communities in Quebec
- List of township municipalities in Quebec
