= Saint-Claude, Quebec =

Saint-Claude
- Municipality
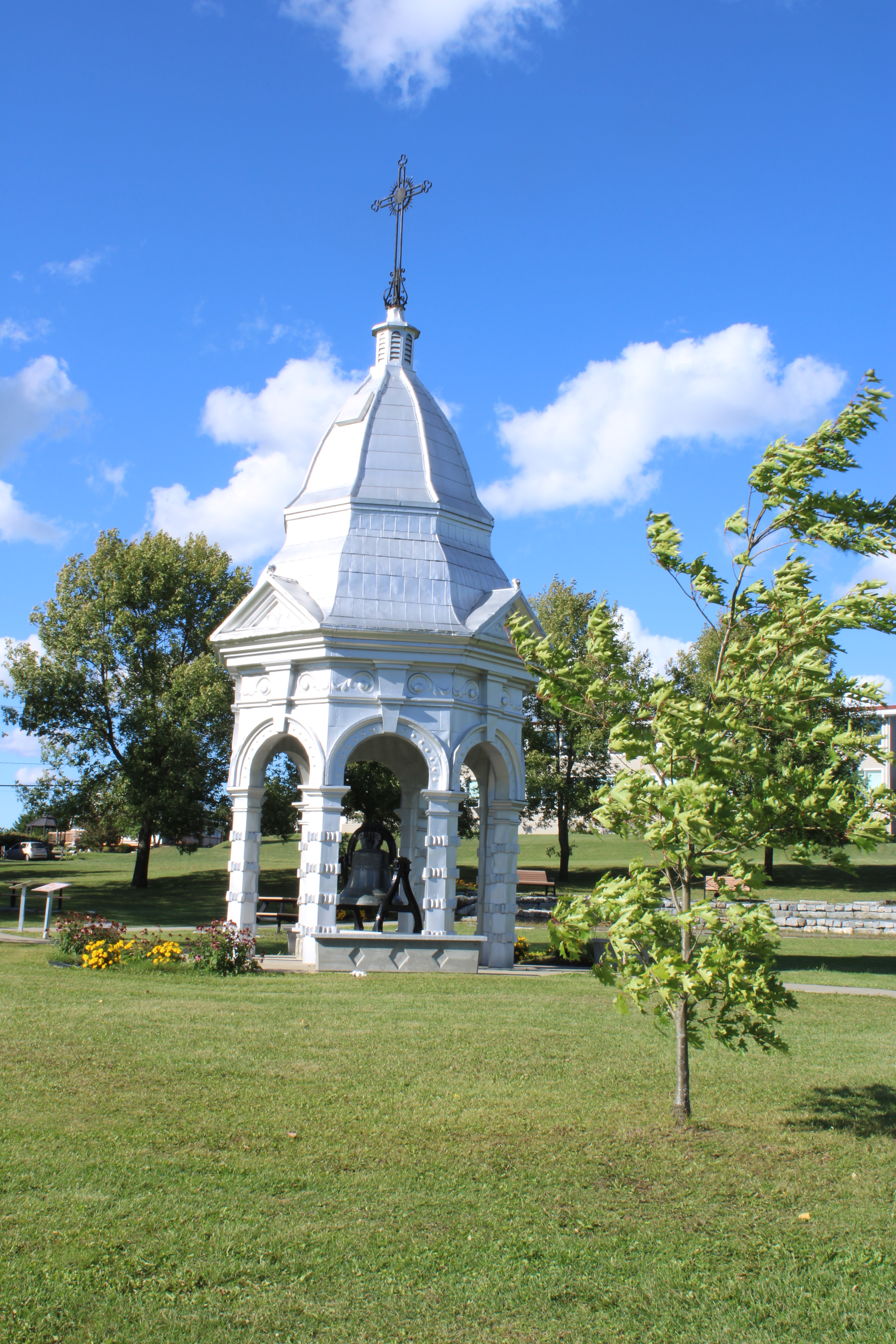

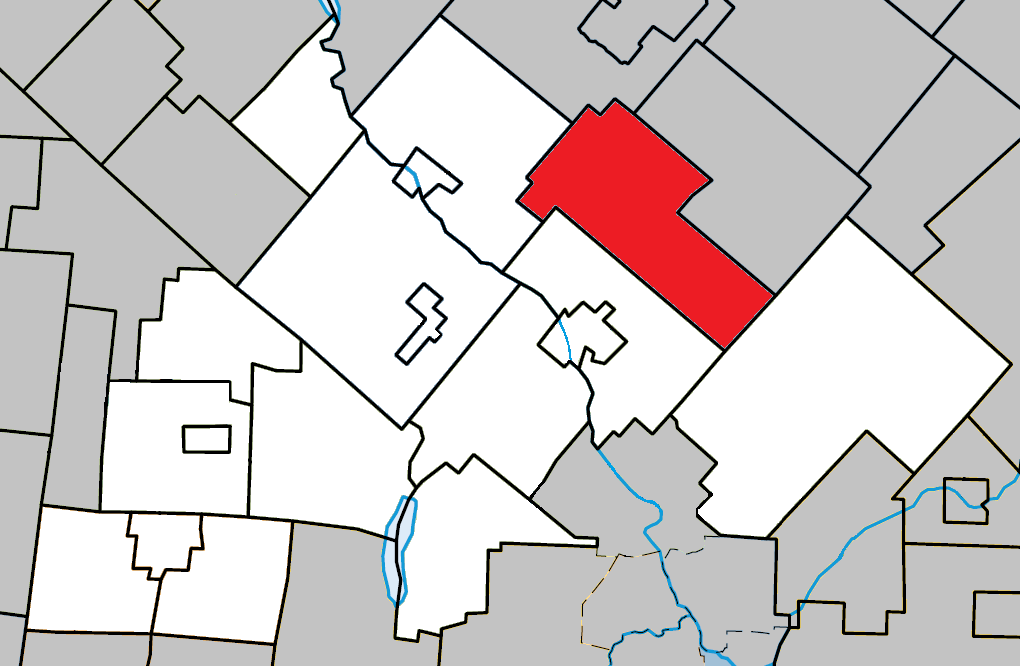
- Location within Le Val-Saint-François RCM

- Location in southern Quebec
- Coordinates: 45°40′N 71°59′W
- Country: Canada
- Province: Quebec
- Region: Estrie
- RCM: Le Val-Saint-François
- Constituted: November 15, 1912

Government
  - Mayor: Jean Labrecque
  - Federal riding: Richmond—Arthabaska—des-Sources
  - Prov. riding: Richmond

Area
  - Total: 121.50 km^{2} (46.91 sq mi)
  - Land: 118.85 km^{2} (45.89 sq mi)

Population (2021)
  - Total: 1,141
  - Density: 9.6/km^{2} (25/sq mi)
  - Pop 2016-2021: ▼3.7%
  - Dwellings: 491
- Time zone: UTC−5 (EST)
  - Summer (DST): UTC−4 (EDT)
- Postal code(s): J0B 2N0
- Area code: 819
- Highways: R-249
- Website: www.municipalite.st-claude.ca

Saint-Claude (French pronunciation: [sɛ̃ klod]) is a municipality in Quebec.

== History ==
The town was founded as a Catholic mission within the municipality of Windsor. In 1878, several families settled there. Several shops, a school and a post office were built. In 1912, the municipality was officially created when it split away from Windsor. Originally, the municipality was called Nord-du-Canton-de-Windsor. In 1922, the name of the municipality was changed to Saint-Claude. The core of the municipality was initially located in the northern part of Saint-Claude, but a fire destroyed the buildings and forced the inhabitants to move to the current part of the town.

Lake Boissonneault was once used to supply the Windsor paper mill, but is now a residential area of the town.

== Demographics ==
=== Population ===
Historical Census Data - Saint-Claude, Quebec
Year	Pop.	±%
1921	1,127	—
1931	966	−14.3%
1941	999	+3.4%
1951	908	−9.1%
1956	863	−5.0%
1961	834	−3.4%
1966	854	+2.4%
1971	854	+0.0%
1976	797	−6.7%
1981	1,003	+25.8%
1986	963	−4.0%
1991	957	−0.6%
1996	1,004	+4.9%
2001	1,080	+7.6%
2006	1,104	+2.2%
2011	1,106	+0.2%
2016	1,185	+7.1%
2021	1,141	−3.7%

=== Language ===
Mother tongue (2021)

Language	Population	Pct (%)
French only	1,095	95.6%
English only	25	2.2%
English and French	15	1.3%
Non-official languages	5	0.4%

== See also ==
- List of municipalities in Quebec
