= Windsor, Quebec =

Windsor
- Town
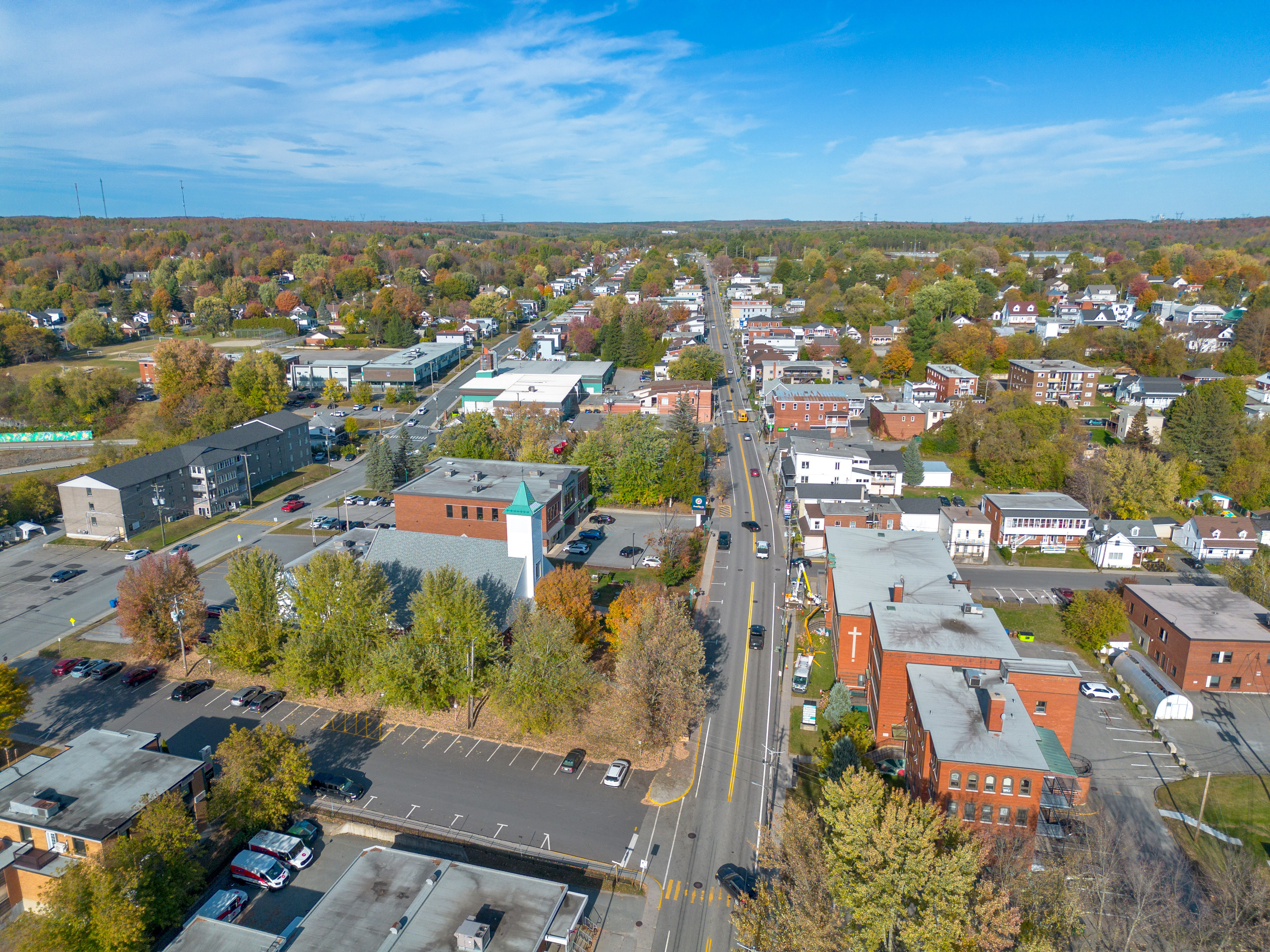
- Windsor in 2025

- Coat of arms

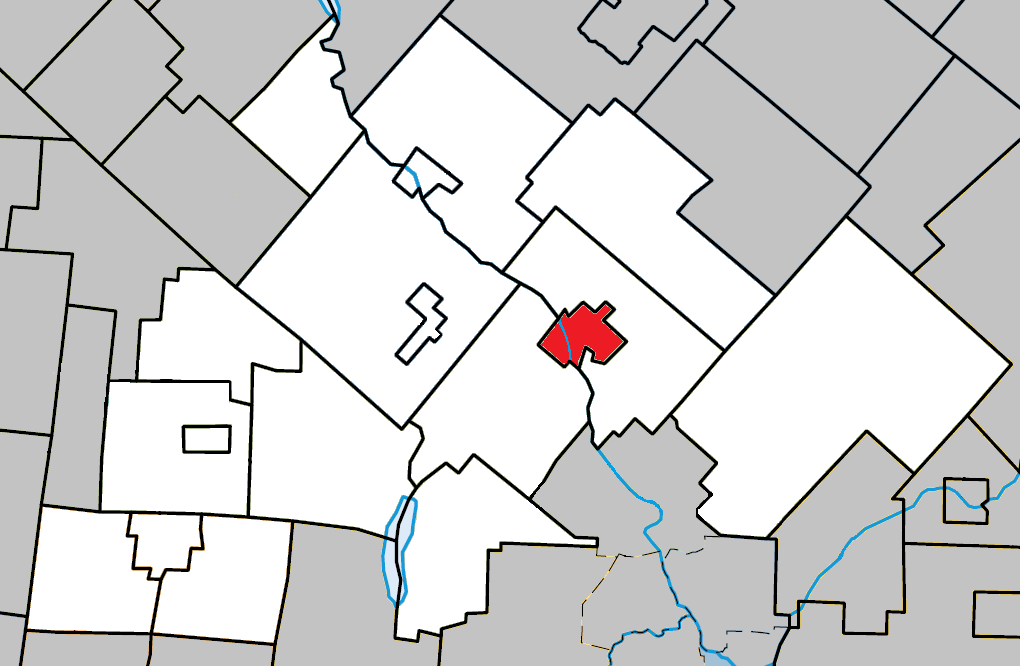
- Location within Le Val-Saint-François RCM

- Location in southern Quebec
- Coordinates: 45°34′N 72°00′W
- Country: Canada
- Province: Quebec
- Region: Estrie
- RCM: Le Val-Saint-François
- Constituted: December 29, 1999

Government
  - Mayor: Gaétan Graveline
  - Federal riding: Richmond—Arthabaska—des-Sources
  - Prov. riding: Richmond

Area
  - Total: 15.00 km^{2} (5.79 sq mi)
  - Land: 14.56 km^{2} (5.62 sq mi)

Population (2011)
  - Total: 5,419
  - Density: 372.2/km^{2} (964/sq mi)
  - Pop 2011-2016: ▲1.7%
  - Dwellings: 2,422
- Time zone: UTC−05:00 (EST)
  - Summer (DST): UTC−04:00 (EDT)
- Postal code(s): J1S 2L7
- Area code: 819
- Highways A-55: R-143; R-249
- Website: www.villedewindsor.qc.ca

Windsor is a town of 5,300 people, part of the Le Val-Saint-François Regional County Municipality in the Estrie region of Quebec, Canada.

== History ==
Apart from the Abenaki Indian camps in this area in the 1600s, Windsor was unpopulated until the early 19th century, when Governor General Prescott granted a tract of land to Joseph Brown to thank him for his service to the Crown. In 1876, when French-Canadian colonist Michel Cloutier acquired land, a rift grew between Francophones and Anglophones, with one side locating in the Township municipality and the other in the village of Windsor Mills. Windsor Mills was elevated to town status in 1899, and took its current name in 1914. The name originates from the village of Berkshire, where Windsor Castle, built ca. 1344 at the request of King Edward III, is located. While most of Windsor's economy is built on the pulp and paper industry and textile manufacturing, there are also some worthy attractions. This includes the Poudrière de Windsor, which manufactured black explosive powder in Canada around 1864.

During World War II the Royal Canadian Air Force built and operated No. 4 Elementary Flying Training School as part of the British Commonwealth Air Training Plan near Windsor. The school opened on 34 June 1940 and closed on 25 August 1944. The airfield was located southwest of the town near 45°31′00″N 072°02′12″W. A film, "Knights with Wings", about flight training in the BCATP, was filmed at the flying school at Windsor Mills. "An RCAF Pilot's Story 1939-1945: the Memoirs of Ernest E. Allen", recounts some of his experiences learning to fly at Windsor Mills in 1940-41.

On December 29, 1999, the village municipality of Saint-Grégoire-de-Greenlay was merged into the town of Windsor.

== Demographics ==
Historical Census Data - Windsor, Quebec
Year	Pop.	±%
1986	5,475	—
1991	5,426	−0.9%
1996	5,515	+1.6%
2001	5,321	−3.5%
2006	5,239	−1.5%
2011	5,330	+1.7%
2016	5,419	+1.7%
Population amounts prior to 1999 are total of Windsor V and Saint-Grégoire-de-Greenlay VL. 2011 population count based on 2016 correction amendment. Source: Statistics Canada

In the 2021 Census of Population conducted by Statistics Canada, Windsor had a population of 5,294 living in 2,362 of its 2,446 total private dwellings, a change of −2.3% from its 2016 population of 5,419. With a land area of 14.53 km^{2} (5.61 sq mi), it had a population density of 364.3/km^{2} (943.7/sq mi) in 2021.

Mother tongue (2021)

Language	Population	Pct (%)
French only	4,880	96.6%
English only	155	3.2%
English and French	25	0.4%
Non-official languages	5	0.0%

== See also ==
- List of cities in Quebec
