= Dudswell, Quebec =

Dudswell
- Municipality
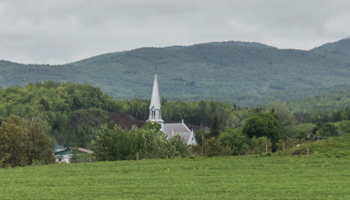
- L'église Saint-Adolphe, Dudswell and the Notre Dame Mountains

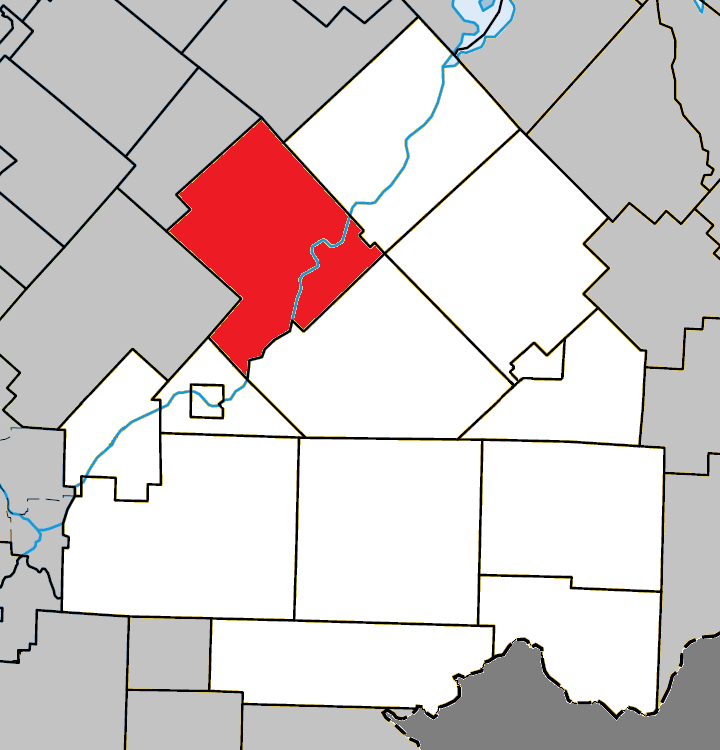
- Location within Le Haut-Saint-François RCM

- Location in southern Quebec
- Coordinates: 45°35′N 71°35′W
- Country: Canada
- Province: Quebec
- Region: Estrie
- RCM: Le Haut-Saint-François
- Constituted: October 11, 1995

Government
  - Mayor: Claude Corriveau
  - Federal riding: Compton—Stanstead
  - Prov. riding: Mégantic

Area
  - Total: 223.70 km^{2} (86.37 sq mi)
  - Land: 218.01 km^{2} (84.17 sq mi)

Population (2021)
  - Total: 1,755
  - Density: 8/km^{2} (21/sq mi)
  - Pop 2016-2021: ▲1.6%
  - Dwellings: 1,062
- Time zone: UTC−5 (EST)
  - Summer (DST): UTC−4 (EDT)
- Area code: 819
- Highways: R-112; R-255

Dudswell is a municipality of 1,700 people in Le Haut-Saint-François Regional County Municipality, in Quebec, Canada.

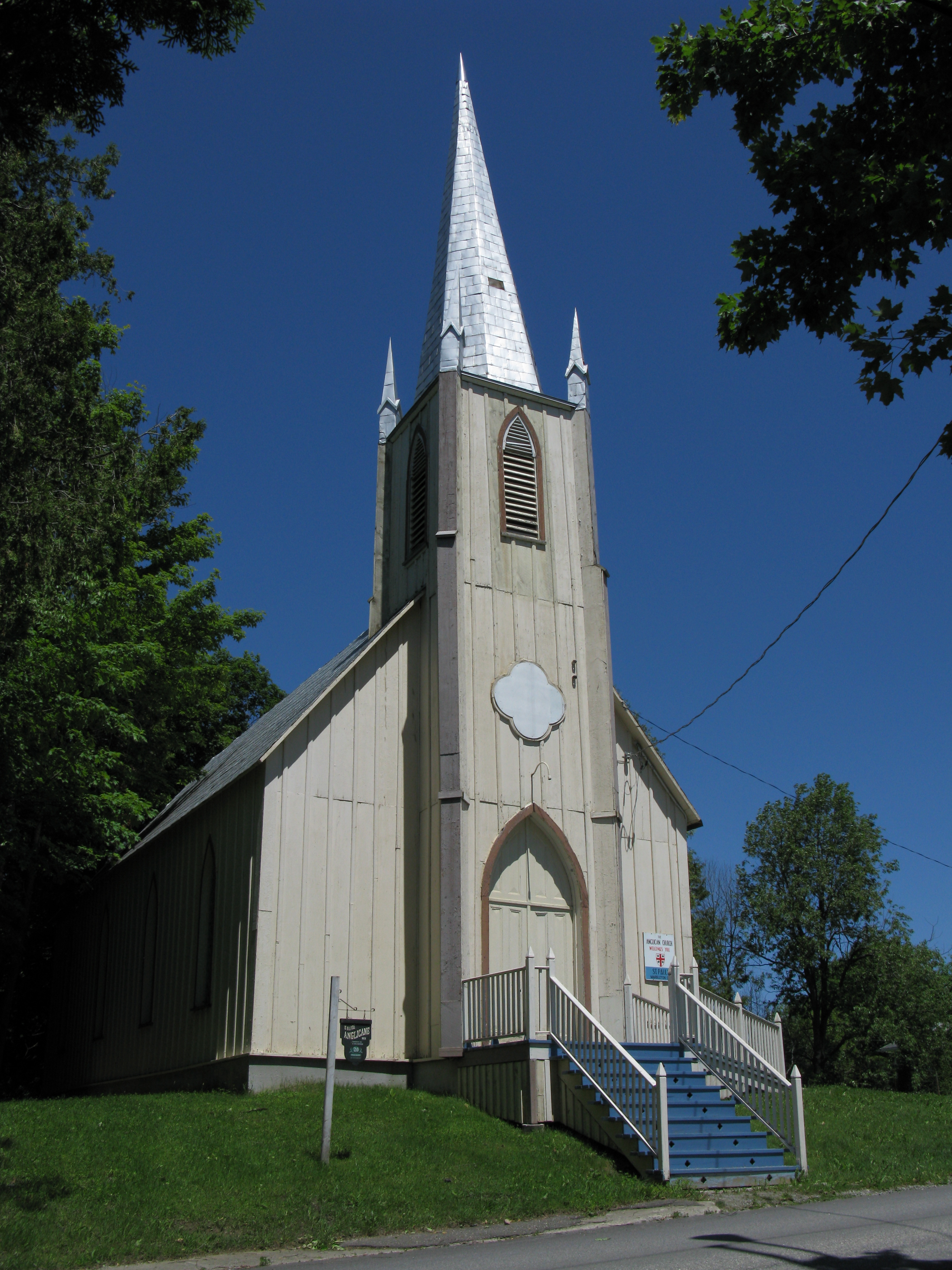
St. Paul's Anglican Church in the Marbleton sector of Dudswell.

== Notable residents ==
- Ralph Gustafson (1909-1995), poet and professor of literature at Bishop's University
- Eva Tanguay (1878-1947), singer, comedienne, vaudevillian and early example of 20th century celebrity culture
- Robert Atkinson Davis, 4th premier of Manitoba.
