= Val-Joli =

- Municipality
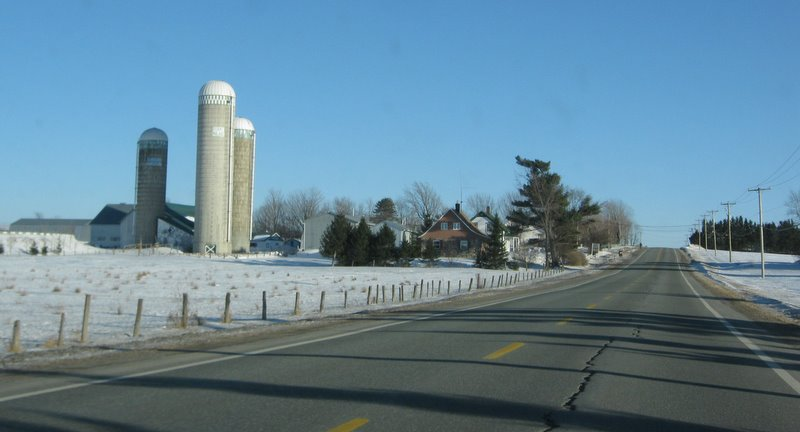

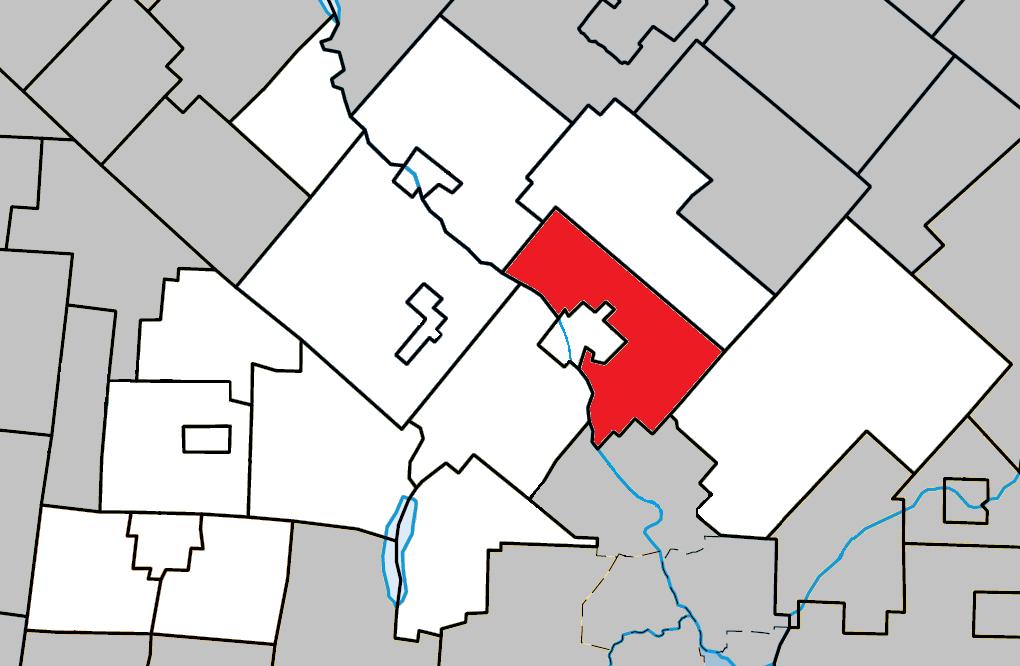
- Location within Le Val-Saint-François RCM

- Location in southern Quebec
- Coordinates: 45.6°N 71.97°W
- Country: Canada
- Province: Quebec
- Region: Estrie
- RCM: Le Val-Saint-François
- Constituted: July 1, 1855

Government
  - Mayor: Patrick Bernier
  - Federal riding: Richmond—Arthabaska—des-Sources
  - Prov. riding: Richmond

Area
  - Total: 92.20 km^{2} (35.60 sq mi)
  - Land: 91.24 km^{2} (35.23 sq mi)

Population (2011)
  - Total: 1,501
  - Density: 16.5/km^{2} (43/sq mi)
  - Pop 2006-2011: ▲1.5%
  - Dwellings: 641
- Time zone: UTC−5 (EST)
  - Summer (DST): UTC−4 (EDT)
- Postal code(s): J1S 0E8
- Area code: 819
- Highways: R-143; R-249
- Website: www.municipalite.val-joli.qc.ca

Val-Joli (French pronunciation: [val ʒɔli]) is a municipality in Quebec, Canada.

== Demographics ==
=== Population ===
Historical Census Data - Val-Joli, Quebec

Year	Pop.	±%
1991	1,511	—
1996	1,536	+1.7%

Year	Pop.	±%
2001	1,532	−0.3%
2006	1,479	−3.5%

Year	Pop.	±%
2011	1,501	+1.5%

=== Language ===
Mother tongue (2011)

Language	Population	Pct (%)
French only	1,440	95.7%
English only	50	3.3%
English and French	10	0.7%
Non-official languages	5	0.3%

== Notable residents ==
- Christian Savoie, (born 1976 in Val-Joli), winner of Canada's Strongest Man and entrant to the World's Strongest Man competition.

== See also ==
- List of municipalities in Quebec
