= Stoke, Quebec =

Stoke
- Municipality
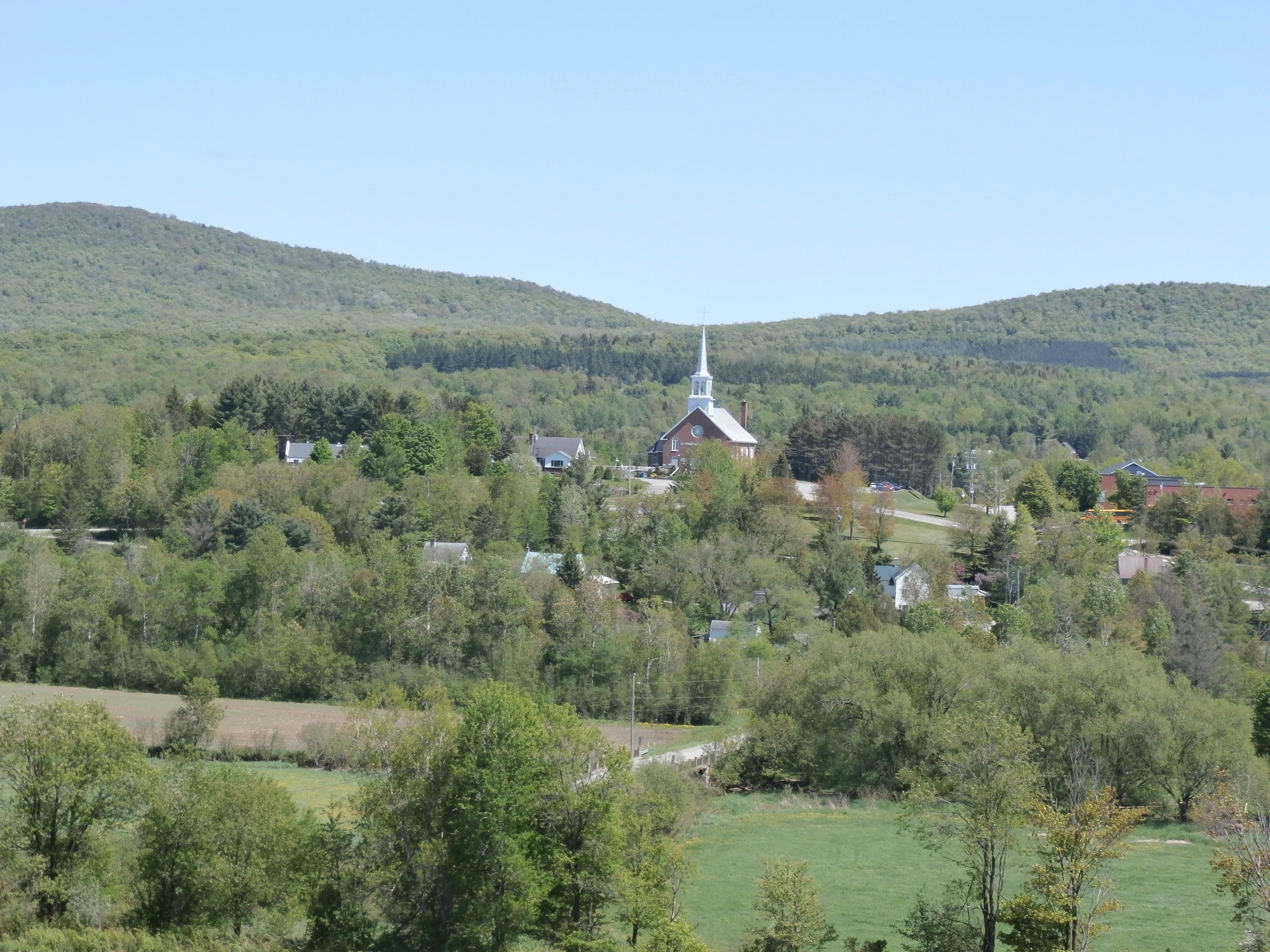
- Stoke's village

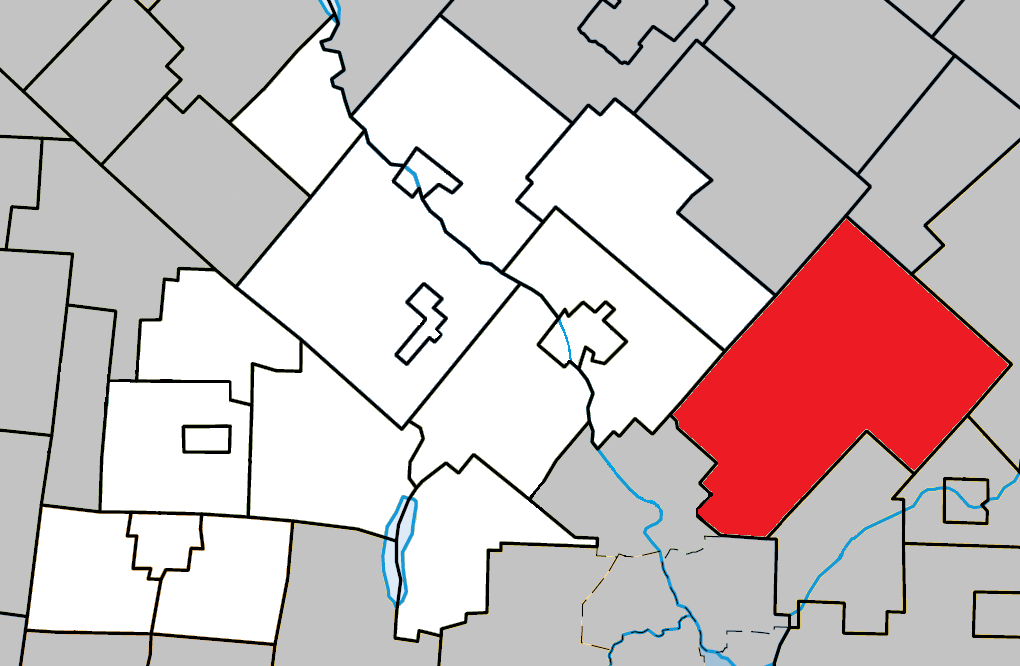
- Location within Le Val-Saint-François RCM

- Location in southern Quebec
- Coordinates: 45°32′N 71°48′W
- Country: Canada
- Province: Quebec
- Region: Estrie
- RCM: Le Val-Saint-François
- Constituted: January 1, 1864

Government
  - Mayor: Étienne-Alexis Boucher
  - Federal riding: Compton—Stanstead
  - Prov. riding: Mégantic

Area
  - Total: 252.90 km^{2} (97.65 sq mi)
  - Land: 255.12 km^{2} (98.50 sq mi)
- There is an apparent contradiction between two authoritative sources

Population (2021)
  - Total: 3,014
  - Density: 11.8/km^{2} (31/sq mi)
  - Pop 2016-2021: ▲2%
  - Dwellings: 1,283
- Time zone: UTC−5 (EST)
  - Summer (DST): UTC−4 (EDT)
- Postal code(s): J0B 3G0
- Area code: 819
- Highways: R-216
- Website: stoke.ca

Stoke is a municipality in Le Val-Saint-François in the Estrie region of Quebec in Canada.

The Sentiers de l'Estrie hiking trails provide access to Mount Chapman, the highest peak of the Stoke Mountains, and Bald Peak, at an altitude of 650 metres (2,130 ft).

== History ==
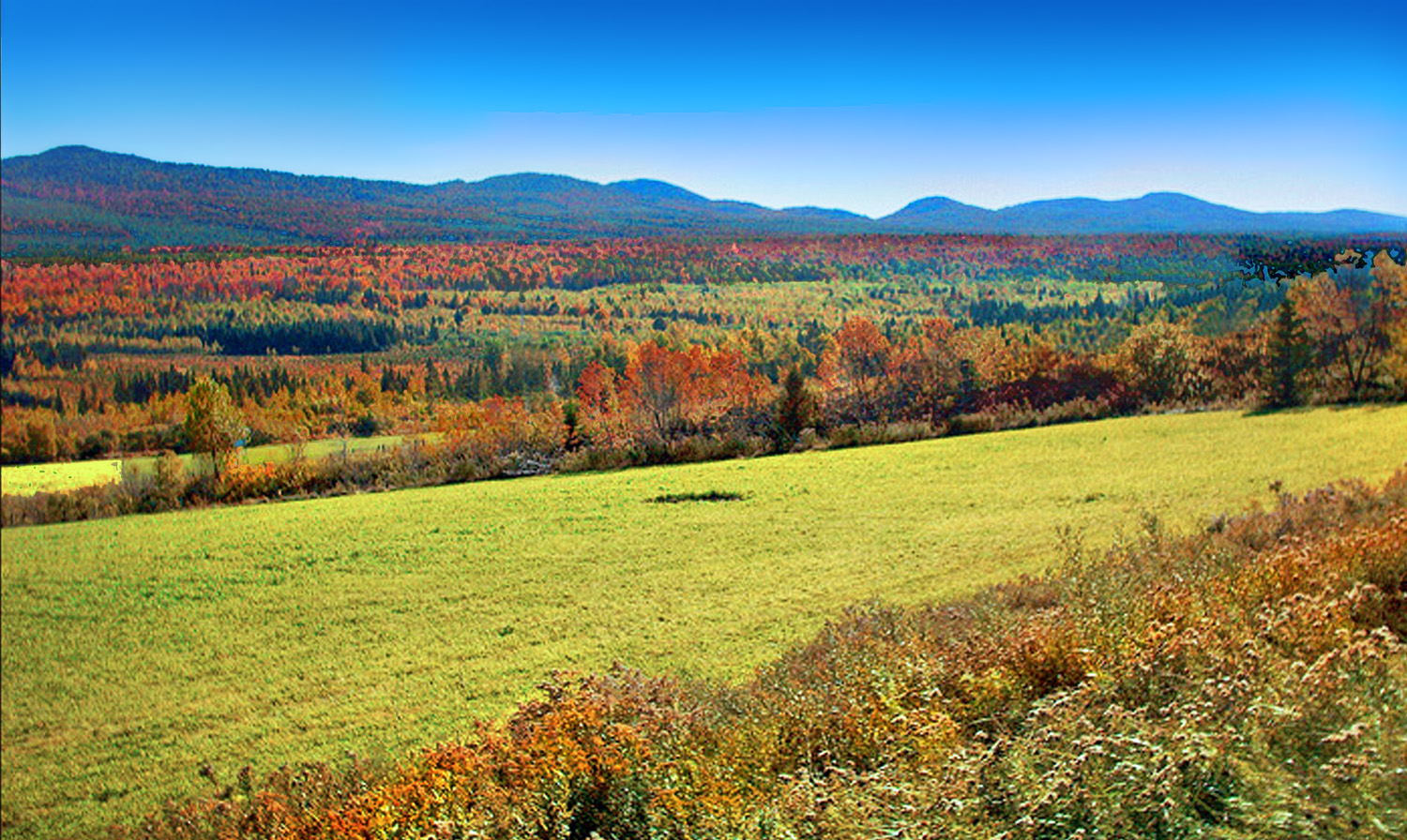
Stoke mountains

Stoke was first known in 1792 as Cowan's Clearance in memory of Moses Cowan, who surveyed the land for the British Crown. The Township was abandoned until 1837 due to a lack of interest, and passed into the hands of the British American Land Company. In 1856, thanks to the Stoke Road and the road that would soon lead to Sherbrooke, the territory was opened to settlement.

A testimony to the repeated efforts of its citizens, Stoke boasts the neo-Gothic Saint-Philémon Church (1892).

== Demographics ==
=== Population ===
Canada census – Stoke, Quebec community profile

	2021	2016	2011
Population	3,014 (2% from 2016)	2,955 (6.9% from 2011)	2,765 (2.1% from 2006)
Land area	255.12 km^{2} (98.50 sq mi)	255.46 km^{2} (98.63 sq mi)	256.52 km^{2} (99.04 sq mi)
Population density	11.8/km^{2} (31/sq mi)	11.6/km^{2} (30/sq mi)	10.8/km^{2} (28/sq mi)
Median age	43.6 (M: 44,0, F: 43.2)	42.8 (M: 43.6, F: 41.8)	41.9 (M: 41.8, F: 42.0)
Private dwellings	1,283 (total)	1,258 (total)	1,118 (total)
Median household income	$88,000	$73,685	$61,562

References: 2021 2016 2011

Historical Census Data - Stoke, Quebec

Year	Pop.	±%
1871	508	—
1881	771	+51.8%
1891	1,133	+47.0%
1901	1,512	+33.5%
1911	1,313	−13.2%
1921	1,527	+16.3%
1931	1,371	−10.2%
1941	1,280	−6.6%
1951	1,248	−2.5%
1956	1,230	−1.4%
1961	1,310	+6.5%
1966	1,356	+3.5%

Year	Pop.	±%
1971	1,453	+7.2%
1976	1,801	+24.0%
1981	2,079	+15.4%
1986	2,142	+3.0%
1991	2,287	+6.8%
1996	2,409	+5.3%
2001	2,606	+8.2%
2006	2,708	+3.9%
2011	2,765	+2.1%
2016	2,955	+6.9%
2021	3,014	+2.0%

Source: Statistics Canada

=== Language ===
Mother tongue (2021)

Language	Population	Pct (%)
French only	2,925	97.0%
English only	45	1.5%
English and French	25	0.8%
Non-official languages	20	0.7%

== Local government ==
List of former mayors:

- Bertrand Ducharme (2003–2009)
- Luc Cayer (2009–present)

== See also ==
- List of municipalities in Quebec
