= Dion River =

River in Centre-du-Québec, Quebec (Canada)

Location
- Country: Canada
- Province: Quebec
- Region: Centre-du-Québec
- Regional County Municipality: Les Sources Regional County Municipality

Physical characteristics
- Source: Agricultural streams
  - location: Saint-Camille
  - coordinates: 45°43′21″N 71°44′25″W
  - elevation: 308 m (1,010 ft)
- Mouth: Nicolet River
  - location: Ham-Nord
  - coordinates: 45.69°N 71.79916°W
  - elevation: 173 m (568 ft)
- Length: 8.0 km (5.0 mi)

Basin features
- Progression: Nicolet Southwest River, Nicolet River, St. Lawrence River
- Tributaries
  - left: (upstream)
  - right: (upstream)

The Dion river (in French: rivière Dion) is a tributary on the east bank of the Nicolet Southwest River. Its course crosses the municipalities of Saint-Camille, Wotton and Saint-Georges-de-Windsor, in the Les Sources Regional County Municipality (MRC), in the administrative region of Estrie, in Quebec, in Canada.

== Geography ==
The main neighboring hydrographic slopes of the Dion river are:

- north side: Nicolet Centre River, Aunière stream;
- east side: Nicolet Centre River, Weedon Stream, Saint-François River;
- south side Madeleine River, Saint-Camille Brook, Nicolet Southwest River;
- west side: Nicolet Southwest River.

The Dion river feeds from various agricultural and forest streams in the sixth rang of the municipality of Saint-Camille. This head area is located north of the village of Saint-Camille, on the north side of the sixth rang road and south-west of Ham-Sud.

From its head area, the Dion river flows southwest, crossing the sixth rang road, the route 255 and the second road rank.

The Dion river empties on the east bank of the Nicolet Southwest River. Its confluence is located downstream of the confluence of the Saint-Camille Brook and upstream of the Aulnière stream.

== Toponymy ==
The term "Dion" is a family name of French origin.

The toponym "Rivière Dion" was formalized on November 7, 1985, at the Commission de toponymie du Québec.

== See also ==
- Lake Saint-Pierre
- List of rivers of Quebec
