= Madeleine River (Saint-Camille Brook tributary) =

River in Estrie, Quebec (Canada)

Location
- Country: Canada
- Province: Quebec
- Region: Estrie
- MRC: Le Haut-Saint-François Regional County Municipality, Les Sources Regional County Municipality
- Municipality: Dudswell, Saint-Camille

Physical characteristics
- Source: Agricultural streams
  - location: Saint-Camille
  - coordinates: 45.669399°N 71.664997°W
  - elevation: 382 m (1,253 ft)
- Mouth: Saint-Camille Brook
  - location: Saint-Camille
  - coordinates: 45.68694°N 71.7375°W
  - elevation: 261 m (856 ft)
- Length: 8.3 km (5.2 mi)

Basin features
- River system: Saint-Camille Brook, Nicolet Southwest River, Nicolet River, St. Lawrence River
- Tributaries
  - left: (upstream)
  - right: (upstream)

The Madeleine River (in French: rivière Madeleine) is a tributary on the south shore of the Saint-Camille Brook whose current flows successively into the Nicolet Southwest River, the Nicolet River, Lake Saint-Pierre and St. Lawrence River. Its course flows in the municipalities of Dudswell (MRC Le Haut-Saint-François Regional County Municipality and Saint-Camille, in the Les Sources Regional County Municipality (MRC), in the administrative region of Estrie, in Quebec, in Canada.

== Geography ==
The main neighboring hydrographic slopes of the Madeleine River are:

- north side: Saint-Camille Brook, Dion River;
- east side: Nicolet Centre River;
- south side Nicolet Southwest River;
- west side: Nicolet Southwest River.

The Madeleine River feeds from various agricultural and forest streams in an area south-east of the village of Saint-Camille. This head area is located southeast of the village of Saint-Camille, on the northeast side of rue Desrivières and northwest of chemin du ninth and tenth rank.

From its head area, the Madeleine River flows on 8.3 kilometres (5.2 mi) in the following segments:

- 1.8 kilometres (1.1 mi) southwesterly, in the municipality of Dudswell, to the municipal limit of Saint-Camille;
- 1.6 kilometres (0.99 mi) towards the north-west, to the confluence of a stream (coming from the north-east);
- 1.6 kilometres (0.99 mi) north-west, crossing rue Desrivières, passing south of the village of Saint-Camille, to rue Miquelon (route 216);
- 3.3 kilometres (2.1 mi) towards the north-west, to its mouth.

The Madeleine river empties on the south bank of the Saint-Camille Brook which is a tributary of the Nicolet Southwest River. Its confluence is located 1.6 kilometres (0.99 mi) upstream of the second and third rang road bridge, which is located at the intermunicipal limit of Wotton and Saint-Camille.

== Toponymy ==
The term "Madeleine" constitutes a first name of French origin.

The toponym "Rivière Madeleine" was formalized on March 19, 1979, at the Commission de toponymie du Québec.

== See also ==
- List of rivers of Quebec
