= Saint-Camille Brook =

River in Estrie, Quebec, Canada

Saint-Camille River

Location
- Country: Canada
- Province: Quebec
- Region: Estrie
- MRC: Les Sources Regional County Municipality
- Municipality: Saint-Camille, Saint-Georges-de-Windsor

Physical characteristics
- Source: Agricultural streams
  - location: Saint-Camille
  - coordinates: 45.686264°N 71.689205°W
  - elevation: 296 m (971 ft)
- Mouth: Nicolet Southwest River
  - location: Saint-Georges-de-Windsor
  - coordinates: 45.67083°N 71.7875°W
  - elevation: 218 m (715 ft)
- Length: 9.9 km (6.2 mi)
- Discharge
  - average: Ni

Basin features
- River system: Nicolet Southwest River, Nicolet River, St. Lawrence River
- Tributaries
  - left: (upstream)
  - right: (upstream)

The brook Saint-Camille (in French: ruisseau Saint-Camille) is a tributary of the east bank of the Nicolet Southwest River whose current flows successively into the Nicolet River, the lac Saint-Pierre and the St. Lawrence River. Its course flows through the municipalities of Saint-Camille and Saint-Georges-de-Windsor, in the Les Sources Regional County Municipality (MRC), in the administrative region of Estrie, in Quebec, in Canada.

== Geography ==
The main hydrographic slopes near the Saint-Camille stream are:

- north side: Dion River;
- east side: Nicolet Centre River;
- south side Nicolet Southwest River;
- west side: Nicolet Southwest River.

The Saint-Camille stream feeds on various agricultural and forest streams in an area north-east of the village of Saint-Camille. This head zone is located southeast of rue Miquelon (route 216) and on the northeast side of rue Desrivières.

From its head area, the Saint-Camille stream flows over 9.9 kilometres (6.2 mi) in the following segments:

- 2.1 kilometres (1.3 mi) westward, in the municipality of Saint-Camille, to rue Miquelon (route 216);
- 1.8 kilometres (1.1 mi) west, to rue Desrivières;
- 3.4 kilometres (2.1 mi) westward, up to the municipal limit of Wotton;
- 1.3 kilometres (0.81 mi) westward, in the municipality of Wotton, to the municipal limit of Saint-Georges-de-Windsor;
- 1.3 kilometres (0.81 mi) westward, in Saint-Georges-de-Windsor, to its mouth.

The Saint-Camille stream empties on the east bank of the Nicolet Southwest River. Its confluence is located 4.8 kilometres (3.0 mi) east of the center of the village of Saint-Georges-de-Windsor and 3.1 kilometres (1.9 mi) upstream of the confluence of the Dion River.

== Toponymy ==
The term "Camille" constitutes a first name of French origin.

The toponym "Ruisseau Saint-Camille" was made official on December 5, 1968, at the Commission de toponymie du Québec.

== See also ==
- List of rivers of Quebec
