= Nicolet North-East River =

River in Centre-du-Québec, Quebec (Canada)

Location
- Country: Canada
- Province: Quebec
- Region: Centre-du-Québec
- Regional County Municipality: Les Sources Regional County Municipality

Physical characteristics
- Source: Streams
  - location: Wotton
  - coordinates: 45°51′45″N 71°47′26″W
  - elevation: 300 m (980 ft)
- Mouth: Nicolet Southwest River
  - location: Wotton
  - coordinates: 45.7775°N 71.82555°W
  - elevation: 183 m (600 ft)

Basin features
- Progression: Nicolet Centre River, Nicolet Southwest River, Nicolet River, St. Lawrence River
- Tributaries
  - left: (upstream) rivière chez Larrivée
  - right: (upstream)

The Nicolet North-East River is a tributary of the west bank of the Nicolet Centre River which empties into the Nicolet Southwest River (hydrographic slope of the Nicolet River). It flows into the municipality of Wotton, in the Les Sources Regional County Municipality (MRC), in the administrative region of Estrie, in Quebec, in Canada.

== Geography ==
The main neighboring hydrographic slopes of the "Nicolet Northeast River" are:

- North side: Nicolet River, Laflamme stream;
- East side: Nicolet River, Turgeon stream;
- South side Nicolet Centre River;
- West side: Nicolet Southwest River.

The Nicolet Nord-Est river has its source in the third rang of the municipality of Saint-Adrien, almost at the limit of Notre-Dame-de-Ham. Its source is located near Chemin du 2e Rang.

The main tributaries of the North-East Nicolet river are the Bissonnette River and the rivière chez Larrivée.

The Northeast Nicolet River empties on the north shore of the Nicolet Centre River at 1.4 kilometres (0.87 mi) upstream of the mouth of the latter and 0.7 kilometres (0.43 mi) downstream from the confluence of the Duchesne stream.

== Toponymy ==
The toponym "Rivière Nicolet Nord-Est" was made official on December 5, 1968, at the Commission de toponymie du Québec.

== See also ==
- Lake Saint-Pierre
- List of rivers of Quebec
