= Mount Ham =

Mount Ham may refer to:

- Mont Ham, Quebec
- Mount Hamilton (California), near San Jose
