= Mont-Ham Regional Park =

Protected area in Chaudière-Appalaches, Quebec, Canada

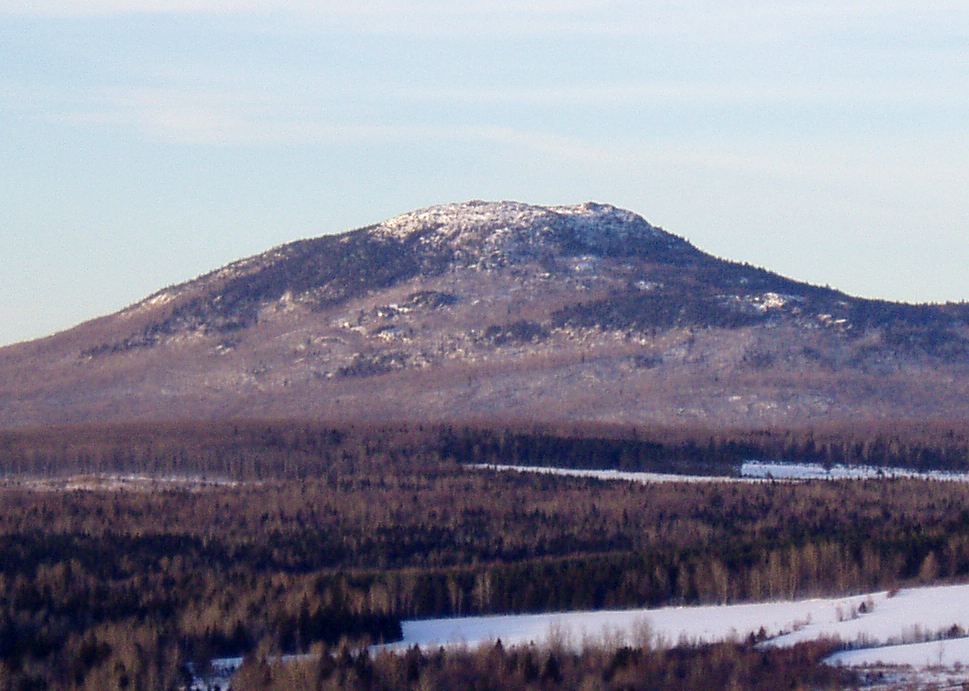
- Mount Ham in winter.

- Location within Quebec
- Location: Canada, Quebec, Estrie, Les Sources Regional County Municipality
- Coordinates: 45.79083°N 71.63639°W
- Elevation: 713 metres (2,339 ft)
- Website: Parc régional du Mont-Ham

The Parc régional du Mont-Ham (in English: Mont-Ham Regional Park) is a regional park highlighting Mont Ham, culminating at 713 metres (2,339 ft). The park is located in the municipality of Ham-Sud, in the Cantons-de-l'Est, in the Les Sources Regional County Municipality, in administrative region of Estrie, in Quebec, in Canada.

The renewed image of the park is inspired by the etymology of the name "waban-aki" (or "abenaki"), meaning "People of the rising sun". The aim is to put an Abenaki accent on it.

The park has given itself a mission to promote responsible and sustainable recreotourism.

== Geography ==
Mount Ham offers a 360-degree panoramic view of the Estrie.The park encompasses the area surrounding Mont Ham.

== History ==
The mont Ham obtained the status of regional park in 2014. It is the first regional park in the Cantons-de-l'Est tourist region.

== Activities ==
This park is open year-round.

The Grand Council of the Waban-Aki Nation (GCNWA) and the MRC des Sources have carried out a promising project for their two communities which translates into four different components:

- development of the Espace Abénakis, a multifunctional space for interpreting the presence of this Nation on the territory;
- an Aboriginal-inspired accommodation sector;
- a mountain discovery trail;
- the development of educational tools to learn more about the Abenaki culture.

== Toponym ==
The toponym "Mont Ham Regional Park" is linked to the name of the mountain. This toponym was made official on November 27, 2015, at the Place Names Bank of the Commission de toponymie du Québec.

== See also ==
- National Parks of Quebec
