= Weedon Stream =

River in Estrie, Quebec (Canada)

Weedon Steam
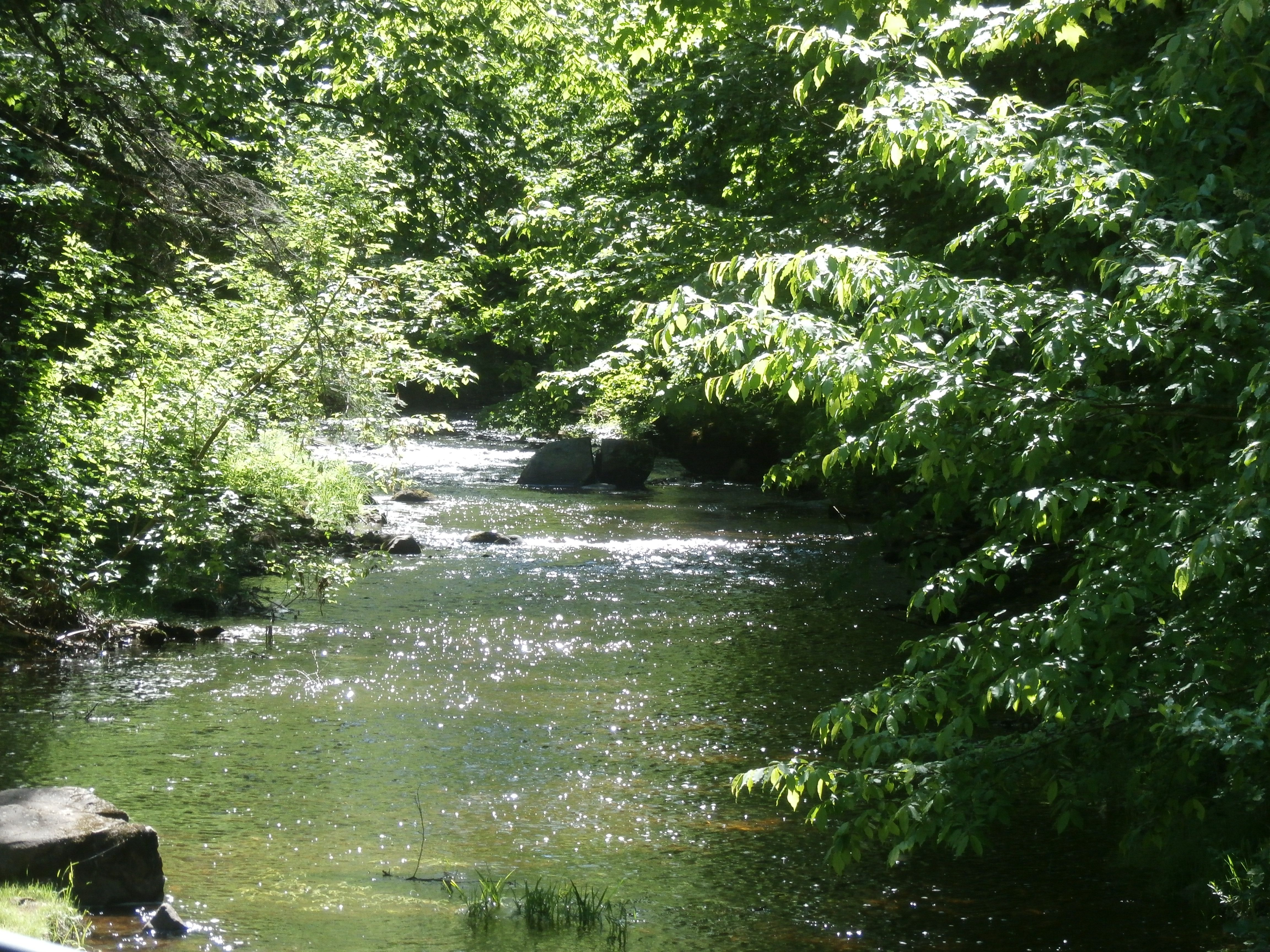
- Weedon steam downstream from Vaseux Lake.

Location
- Country: Canada
- Province: Quebec
- Region: Estrie
- MRC: Le Haut-Saint-François Regional County Municipality
- Municipality: Weedon

Physical characteristics
- Source: Lac Fer à Cheval
  - location: Weedon
  - coordinates: 45.70778°N 71.528536°W
  - elevation: 341 m (1,119 ft)
- Mouth: Saint-François River
  - location: Weedon
  - coordinates: 45.69361°N 71.44861°W
  - elevation: 243 m (797 ft)
- Length: 9.4 km (5.8 mi)

Basin features
- Progression: Saint-François River, St. Lawrence River
- Tributaries
  - right: (upward)

The ruisseau Weedon (in English: Weedon Stream) is a small steam which crosses the municipality of Weedon, in the Le Haut-Saint-François Regional County Municipality (MRC), in the administrative region of Estrie, in Quebec, in Canada.

== Geography ==
The neighboring hydrographic slopes of the Weedon River are:

- north side: Mud stream, Dufresne stream, rivière au Canard;
- east side: rivière au canard, Saint-François River;
- south side: Saint-François River;
- west side: outlet of Lac d'Argent, Nicolet River, Royer stream.

The Weedon River has its source at Lac Fer à Cheval (length: 1.1 kilometres (0.68 mi); altitude: 341 metres (1,119 ft)). This lake is located in the northwestern part of the municipality of Weedon, at 7.1 kilometres (4.4 mi) southeast of the center of the village of Saint-Joseph-de-Ham-Sud and 5.8 kilometres (3.6 mi) west of the intersection of route 112 in the center of the village of Weedon.

From "Lac Fer à Cheval", the Weedon river flows over:

- 6.8 kilometres (4.2 mi) eastward, skirting a mountain to the north (summit at 416 metres (1,365 ft) altitude), to the northwest shore of Vaseux lake (altitude: 289 metres (948 ft)), which the current crosses on 0.9 kilometres (0.56 mi) towards the southeast;
- 0.8 kilometres (0.50 mi) to route 112;
- 1.0 kilometre (0.62 mi) towards the south-east, crossing the village of Weedon, to a street;
- 0.8 kilometres (0.50 mi) towards the south-east, to its mouth.

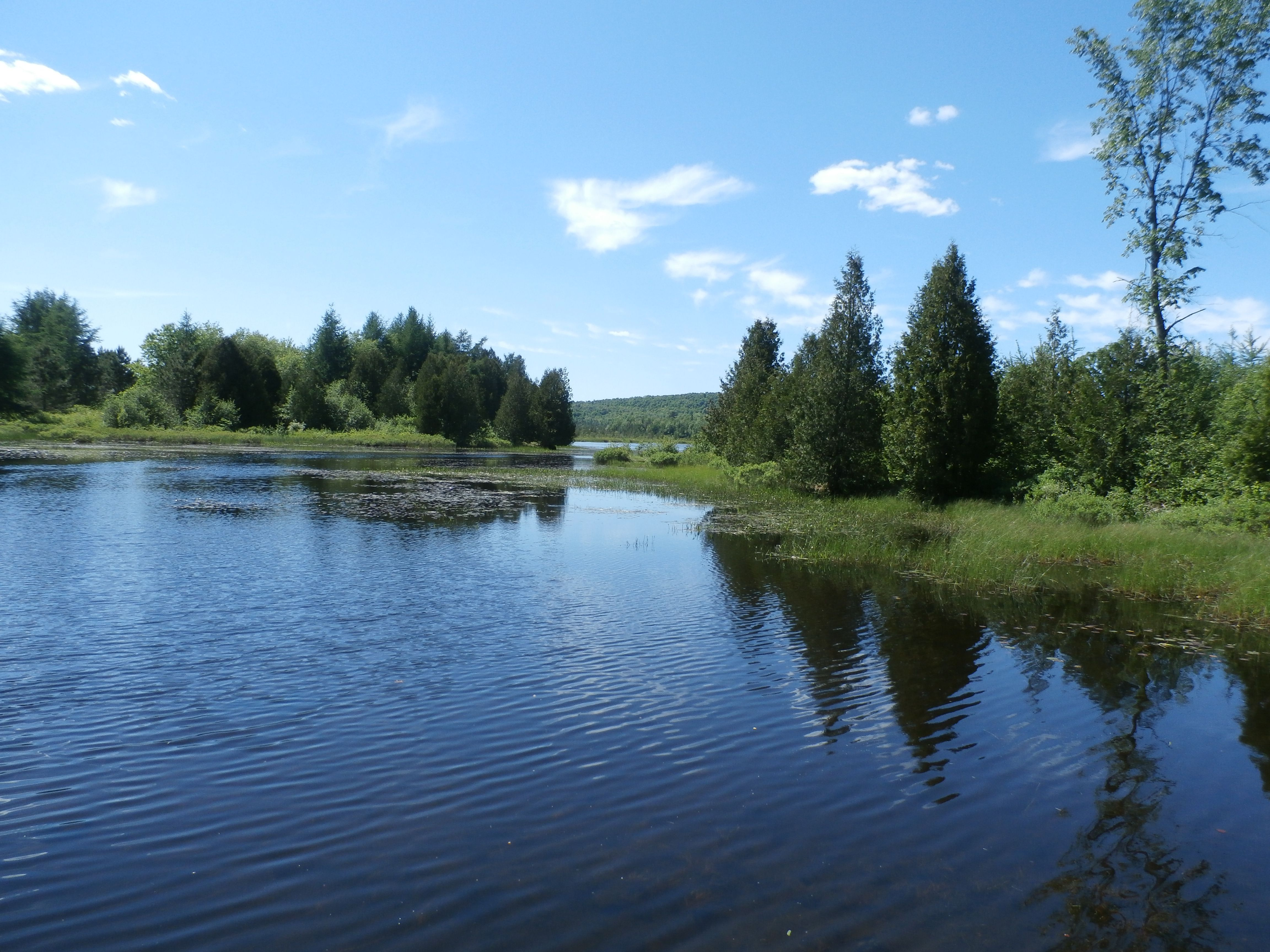
Vaseux lake crossed by the Weedon river.

The Weedon river joins the Saint-François River almost at the same place as the Saumon River.

== History ==
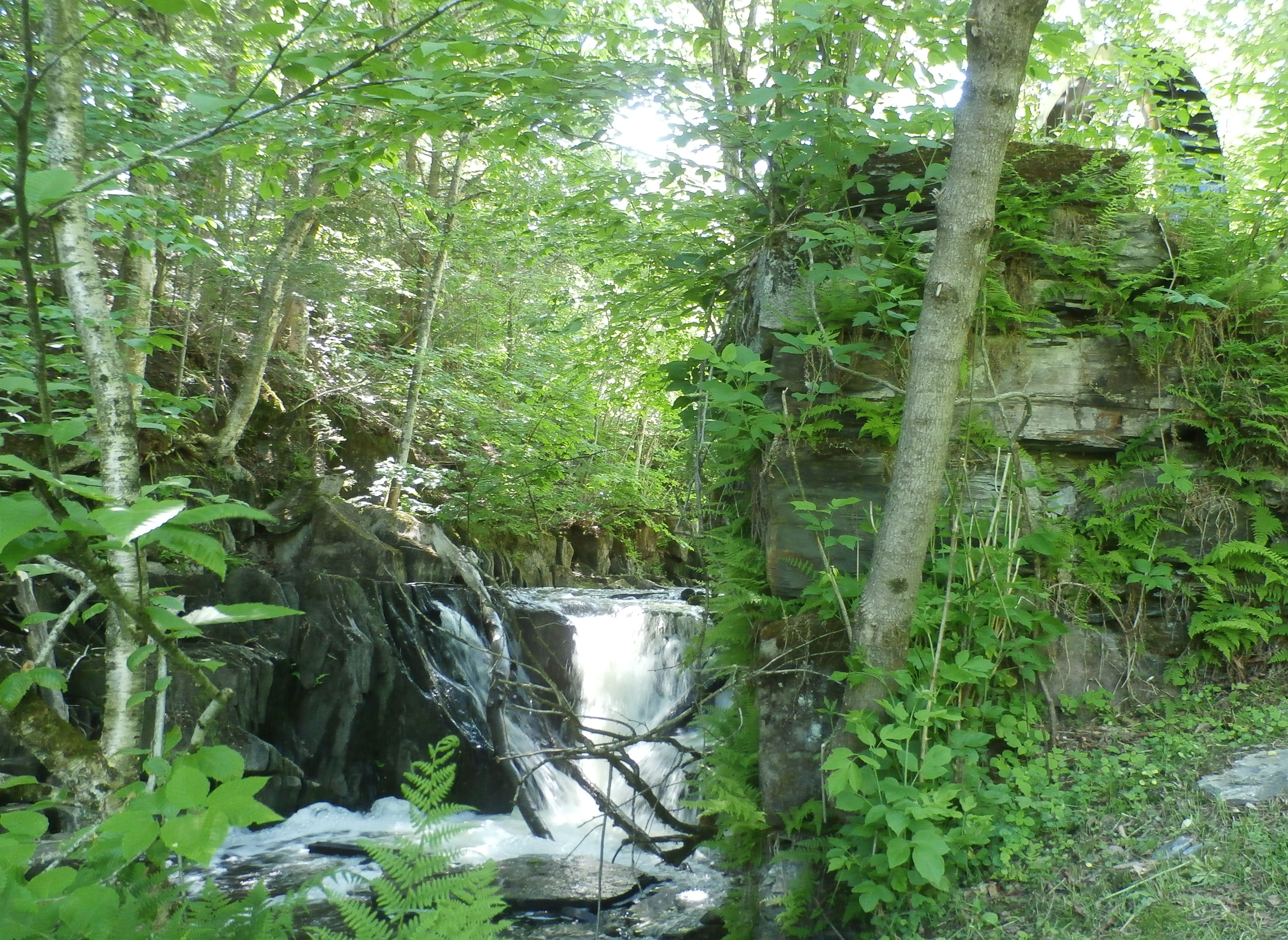
Remains of the old mill on the Weedon River in the Old Mill Park.

The river was used for a long time to feed the old mill, located in the park of the Old Mill, which was at the center of the economy of the nascent municipality. The site of the mill is now a tourist attraction.

== Toponymy ==
The term "Weedon" refers to a town in England in Buckinghamshire. The name of the locality was borrowed from that of the river.

The toponym "ruisseau Weedon" was made official on December 5, 1968, at the Commission de toponymie du Québec.

== See also ==
- List of rivers of Quebec
