= Mont Ham =

Mountain in Canada

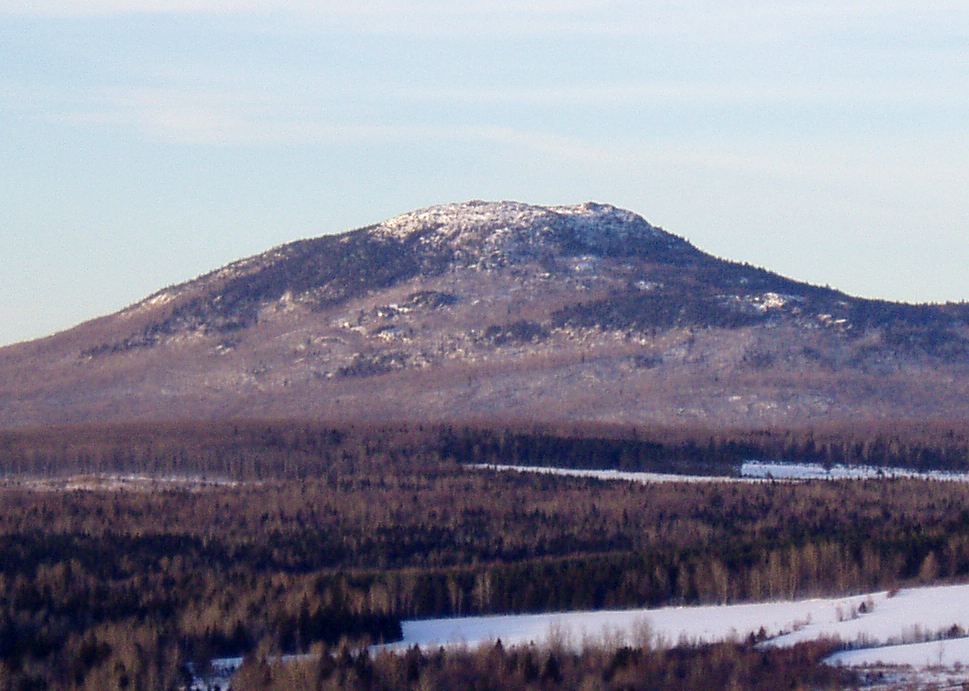

Highest point
- Elevation: 713 m (2,339 ft)
- Prominence: 358 m (1,175 ft)
- Coordinates: 45°47′27″N 71°38′11″W

Geography
- Location within Southern Quebec
- Location: Canada, Quebec, Estrie, Les Sources Regional County Municipality, Ham-Sud (municipality)
- Parent range: Southern Notre Dame Mountains

Geology
- Rock age: Ordovician

Climbing
- Easiest route: hiking

The Mont Ham is a mountain in the southern Notre Dame Mountains (part of the Appalachians), in the municipality of Ham-Sud, in the Les Sources Regional County Municipality, in region of Estrie, in Quebec, Canada.

Mount Ham is located in Ham-Sud, very close to Ham-Nord, in the Eastern Townships (Cantons-de-l'Est) in Quebec and is managed by a non-profit organization, "Le développement du Mont Ham". The mission of the organization is to promote the fauna and flora of the region as well as to create new services and activities that meet the needs of the community and the clientele. The Mount Ham site is also a center for community initiatives.

== Geography ==
It is part of the lowlands of the Appalachians.

Its primary summit lies at an elevation of 713 metres (2,339 ft) and its drop is 360 meters, with a prominence of 358 metres (1,175 ft). Marked trails on the mountain permit visitors a 360 degree view of the surrounding landscape.

== Activities ==
The park in which it is situated is open year-round and offers hiking, scrambling, snowshoeing, cross-country skiing, disc golf, and camping. In 2014, the park became the first in the Eastern Townships to gain "regional park" status, along with a $1,367,250 grant for expansion and improvements.

== Geology ==
While its rocks are considerably older, Mont Ham is surrounded by moraine that was deposited approximately 12,200 years BP during glaciation. The bedrock of the mountain is composed of boninite in an ophiolite complex.

== Toponym ==
The toponym "Mont Ham Regional Park" is linked to the name of the mountain. The latest toponym was made official on December 5, 1968 at the Place Names Bank of the Commission de toponymie du Québec.

== See also ==
- Mont-Ham Regional Park
- List of mountains of Quebec
