= Nicolet Centre River =

River in Centre-du-Québec, Quebec (Canada)

Dion River

Location
- Country: Canada
- Province: Quebec
- Region: Centre-du-Québec
- Regional County Municipality: Les Sources Regional County Municipality

Physical characteristics
- Source: Forested streams
  - location: Wotton
  - coordinates: 45°40′01″N 71°37′23″W
  - elevation: 256 m (840 ft)
- Mouth: Nicolet Southwest River
  - location: Wotton
  - coordinates: 45.77472°N 71.84167°W
  - elevation: 168 m (551 ft)

Basin features
- Progression: Nicolet Southwest River, Nicolet River, St. Lawrence River
- Tributaries
  - left: (upstream)
  - right: (upstream) Nicolet North-East River, ruisseau Duchesne, ruisseau du Quinze, ruisseau Guillotte, ruisseau Turgeon, ruisseau Pinard, ruisseau Darveau, ruisseau Boyer

The Nicolet Centre River (in French: rivière Nicolet Centre) is a tributary on the west bank of the Nicolet Southwest River. It flows into the municipality of Wotton, in the Les Sources Regional County Municipality (MRC), in the administrative region of Estrie, in Quebec, in Canada.

== Geography ==
The main hydrographic slopes near the "Nicolet Center river" are:

- North side: Nicolet Northeast River, Nicolet River;
- East side: Nicolet River, Canard River, Saint-François River;
- South side Madeleine River (Les Sources), Nicolet Southwest River;
- West side: Nicolet Southwest River.

The "Nicolet Center River" takes its source from several mountain streams located south of Chemin des Anglais, west of Lake Louise, west of Saint-François River, south of Mont Ham and west of the village of Weedon. This area is located between two mountains whose summits are 445 metres (1,460 ft) to the west and 424 metres (1,391 ft) to the east.

The "Nicolet Center river" empties on the east bank of the Nicolet Southwest River, upstream from "Les Trois Lacs", upstream from the sixth range bridge and downstream from the route 255.

== Toponymy ==
The toponym "Rivière Nicolet Center" was made official on December 5, 1968, at the Commission de toponymie du Québec.

== See also ==
- Lake Saint-Pierre
- List of rivers of Quebec
