= Ham-Sud =

- Municipality
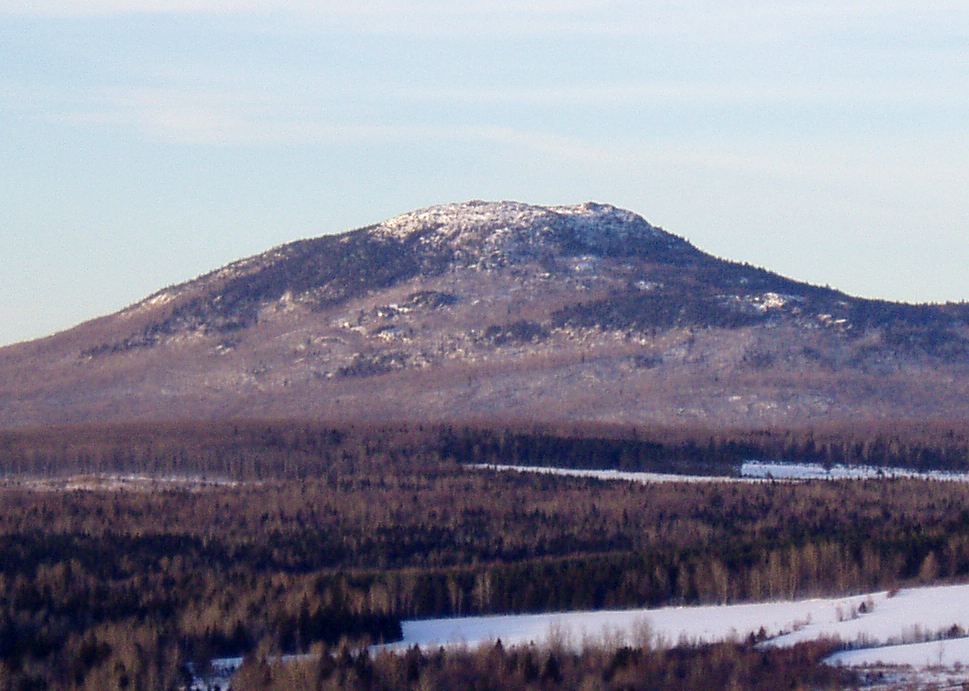
- Mont Ham

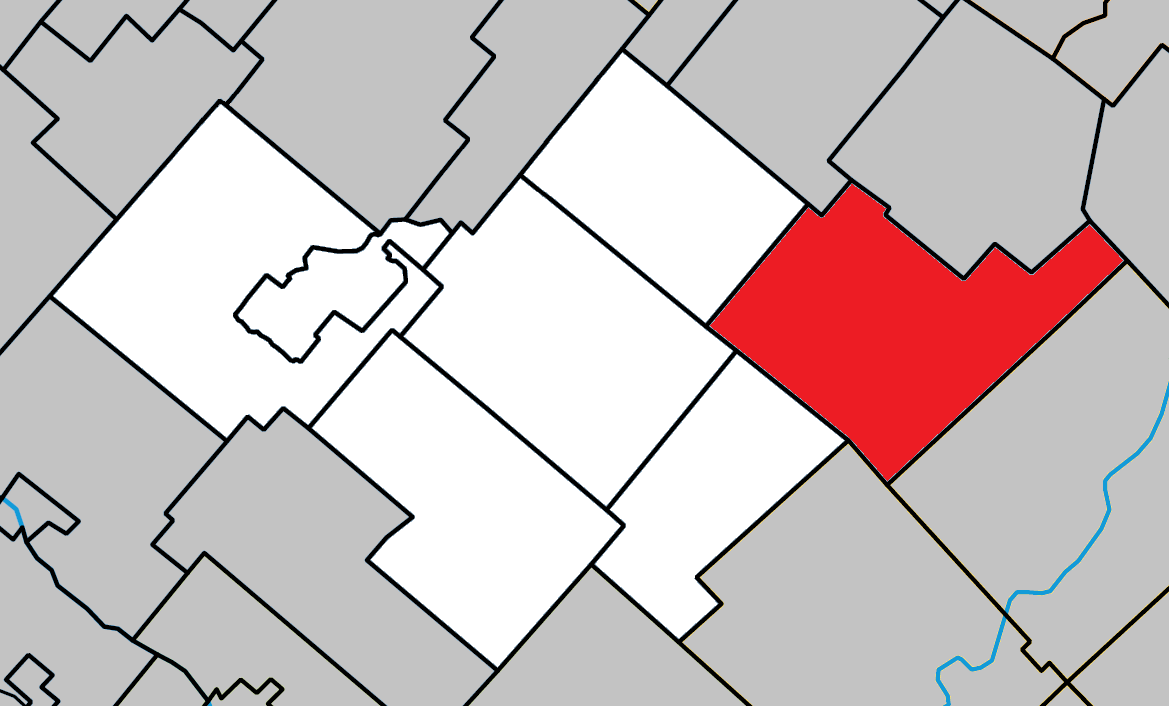
- Location within Les Sources RCM

- Location in southern Quebec
- Coordinates: 45°45′40″N 71°36′07″W
- Country: Canada
- Province: Quebec
- Region: Estrie
- RCM: Les Sources
- Constituted: January 1, 1879
- Named for: West Ham

Government
  - Mayor: Serge Bernier
  - Federal riding: Richmond—Arthabaska—des-Sources
  - Prov. riding: Mégantic

Area
  - Total: 152.40 km^{2} (58.84 sq mi)
  - Land: 151.21 km^{2} (58.38 sq mi)

Population (2021)
  - Total: 214
  - Density: 1.4/km^{2} (3.6/sq mi)
  - Pop 2016-2021: ▼8.9%
  - Dwellings: 147
- Time zone: UTC−5 (EST)
  - Summer (DST): UTC−4 (EDT)
- Postal code(s): J0B 3J0
- Area code: 819
- Highways: R-257
- Website: ham-sud.ca

Ham-Sud is a municipality in Quebec, Canada.

Prior to October 22, 2011 it was a parish municipality and its name was Saint-Joseph-de-Ham-Sud. It lies 20 kilometres (12 mi) to the east of Wotton and about 50 kilometres (31 mi) to the southwest of Thetford Mines. Quebec Route 257 passes through the region.

Colonized in the middle of the 19th century, the township of Ham-Sud, established in 1851, takes its name from a village in the county of Essex in England. One of its first inhabitants, Joseph Dion, would eventually see his first name honoured through attribution to the mission in 1869. The parish was established both canonically and civilly in 1877. The parish municipality, installed two years later, would also take this denomination, Saint-Joseph-de-Ham-Sud.

== History ==
On 22 Oct. 2011, the parish municipality of Saint-Joseph-de-Ham-Sud changed its name and status to simply Municipality of Ham-Sud.

== Demography ==
The 2021 census counted 214 inhabitants, which is a 8.9% decrease from 2016.

== Attractions ==
The Mont-Ham Regional Park is located in Ham-Sud.
