= Saint-Georges-de-Windsor =

- Municipality
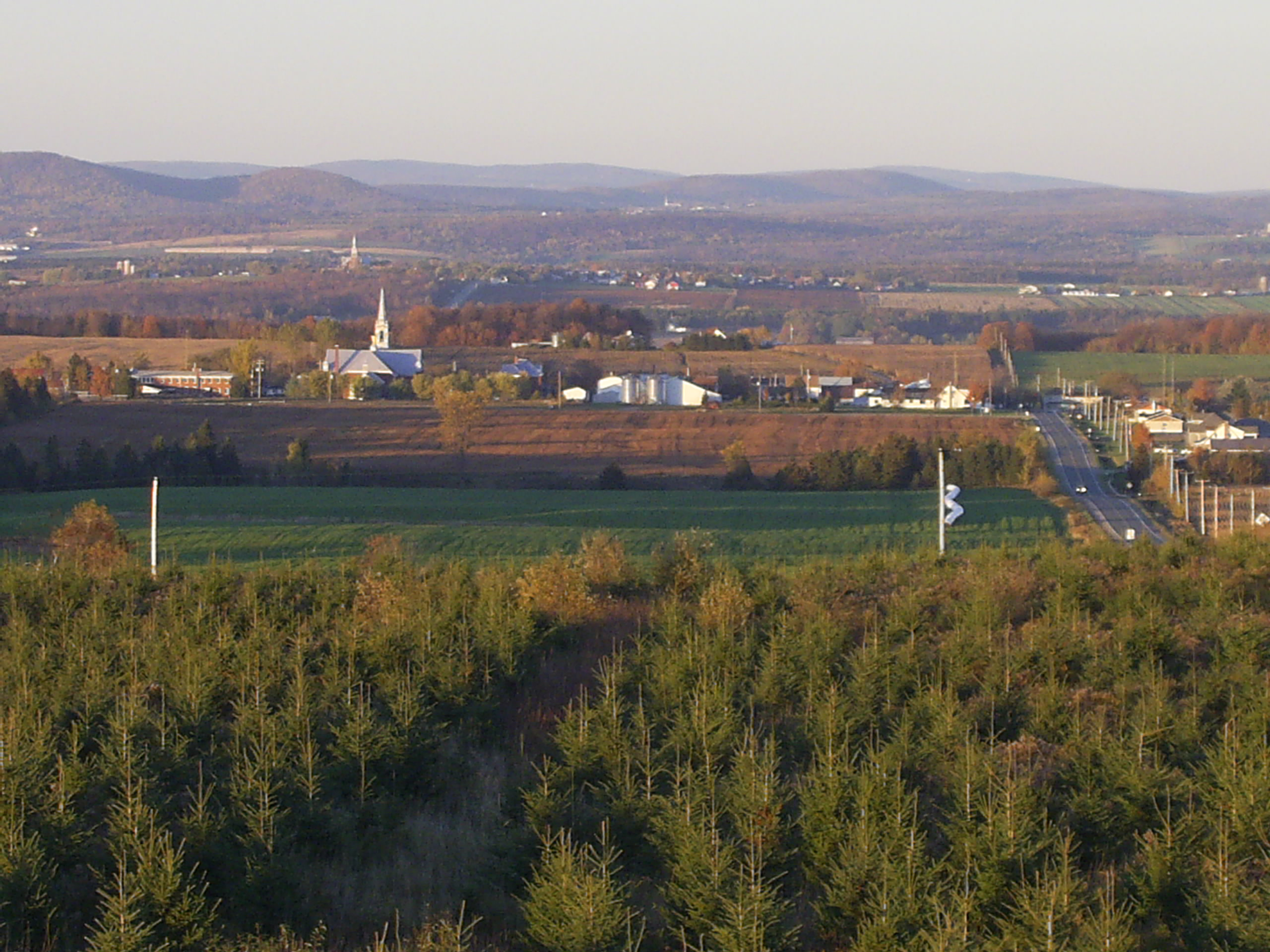

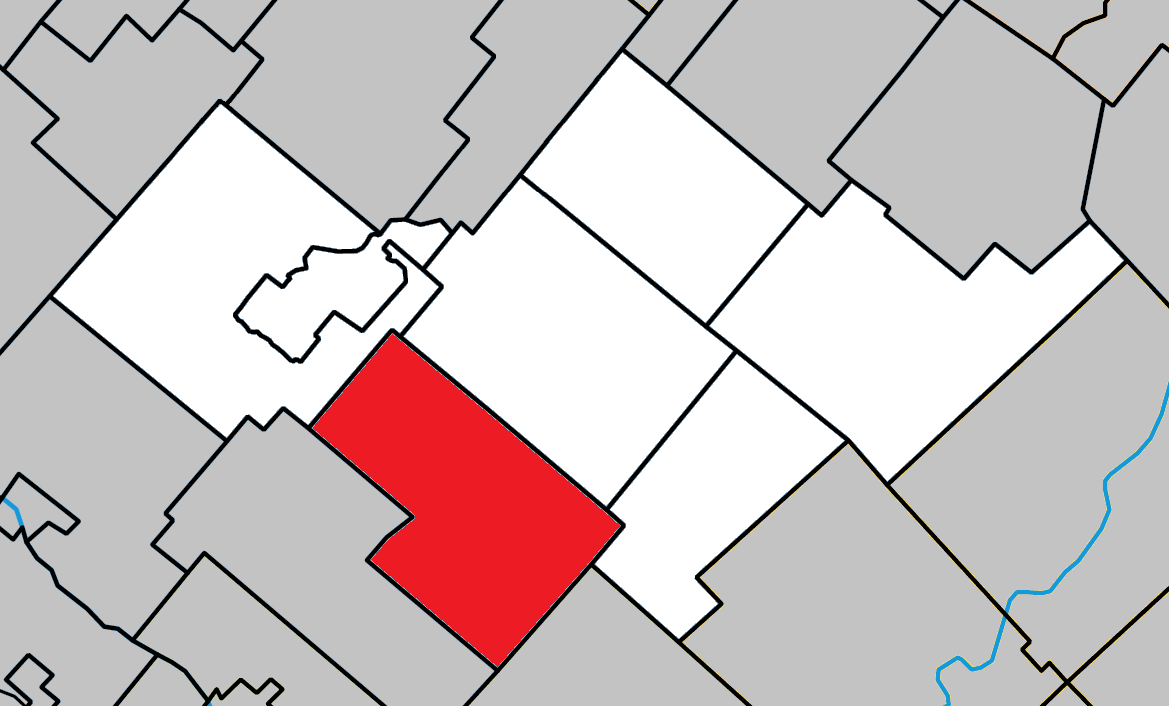
- Location within Les Sources RCM.

- Location in southern Quebec.
- Coordinates: 45°42′N 71°50′W
- Country: Canada
- Province: Quebec
- Region: Estrie
- RCM: Les Sources
- Constituted: November 30, 1994

Government
  - Mayor: René Perreault
  - Federal riding: Richmond—Arthabaska—des-Sources
  - Prov. riding: Mégantic

Area
  - Total: 128.10 km^{2} (49.46 sq mi)
  - Land: 127.46 km^{2} (49.21 sq mi)

Population (2021)
  - Total: 958
  - Density: 7.5/km^{2} (19/sq mi)
  - Pop 2016-2021: 0.0%
  - Dwellings: 460
- Time zone: UTC−5 (EST)
  - Summer (DST): UTC−4 (EDT)
- Postal code(s): J0A 1J0
- Area code: 819
- Highways: R-249

Saint-Georges-de-Windsor is a municipality in Quebec, Canada.
