= Saint-Camille =

- Township municipality
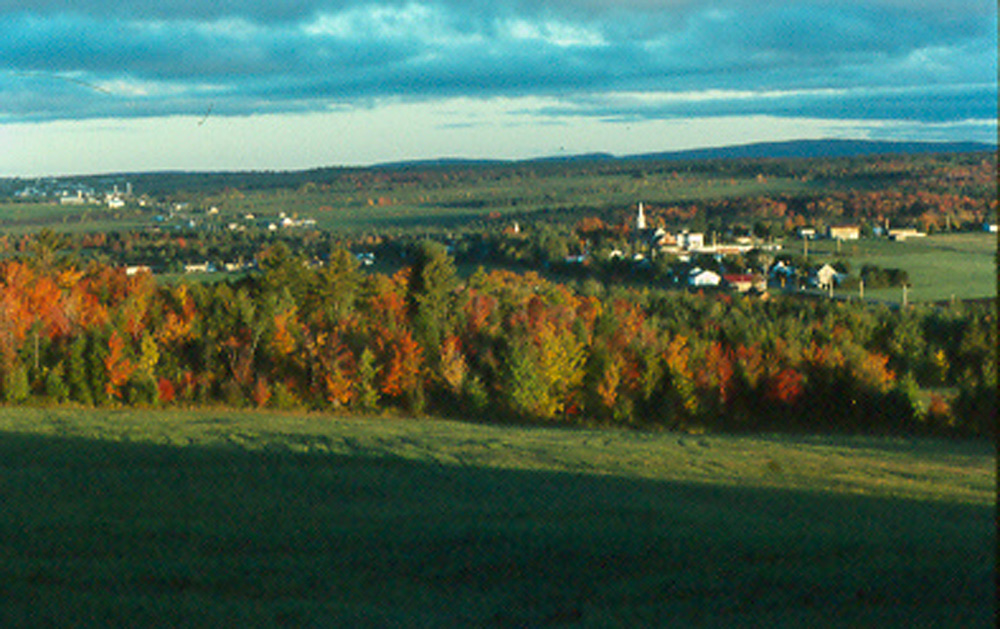
- Saint-Camille from the hills

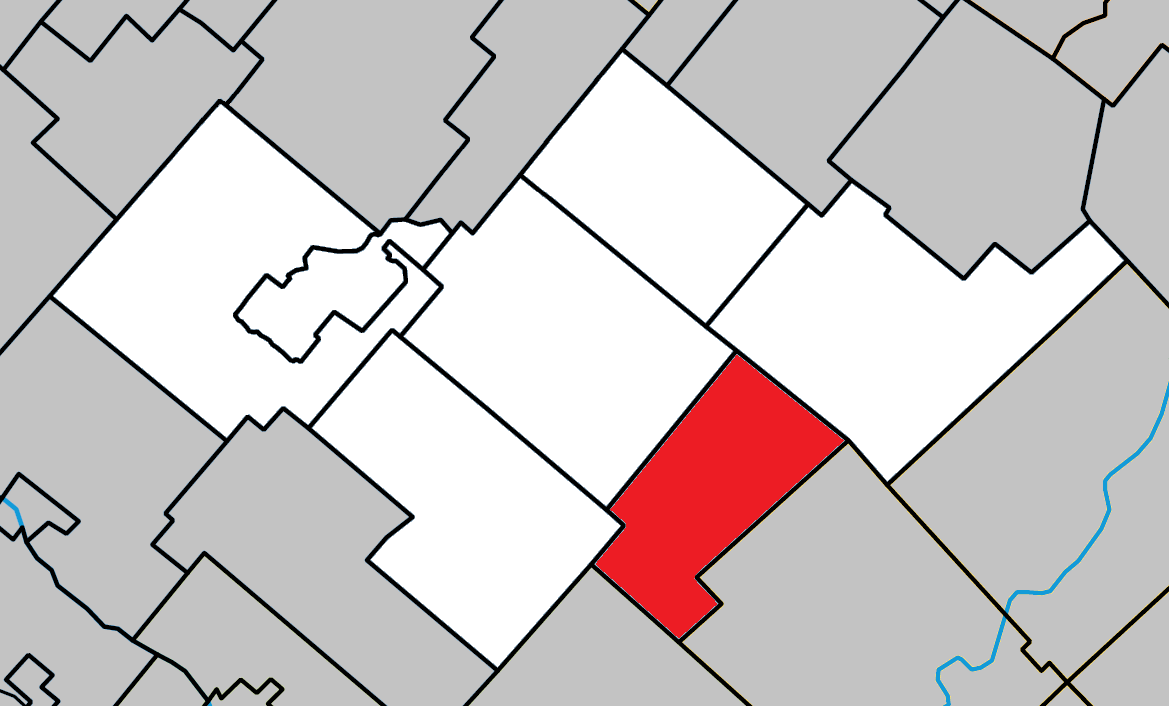
- Location within Les Sources RCM.

- Location in southern Quebec.
- Coordinates: 45°41′N 71°42′W
- Country: Canada
- Province: Quebec
- Region: Estrie
- RCM: Les Sources
- Constituted: January 1, 1860
- Named for: Camillus de Lellis

Government
  - Mayor: François Pinard
  - Federal riding: Richmond—Arthabaska—des-Sources
  - Prov. riding: Mégantic

Area
  - Total: 83.60 km^{2} (32.28 sq mi)
  - Land: 83.10 km^{2} (32.09 sq mi)

Population (2021)
  - Total: 551
  - Density: 6.6/km^{2} (17/sq mi)
  - Pop 2016-2021: ▲4.2%
- Time zone: UTC−5 (EST)
  - Summer (DST): UTC−4 (EDT)
- Postal code(s): J0A 1G0
- Area code: 819
- Highways: R-216; R-255
- Website: www.saint-camille.ca

Saint-Camille (French pronunciation: [sɛ̃ kamil]) is a township municipality in the Canadian province of Quebec, located within the Les Sources Regional County Municipality. The township had a population of 551 in the Canada 2021 Census.

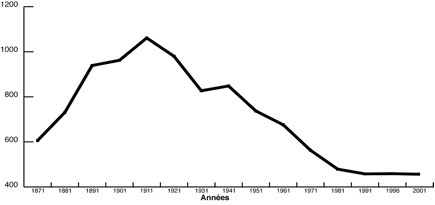
Population of Saint-Camille 1871-2001

== Demographics ==
In the 2021 Census of Population conducted by Statistics Canada, Saint-Camille had a population of 551 living in 225 of its 245 total private dwellings, a change of 4.2% from its 2016 population of 529. With a land area of 83.1 km^{2} (32.1 sq mi), it had a population density of 6.6/km^{2} (17.2/sq mi) in 2021.
