= Wotton, Quebec =

Wotton
- Municipality
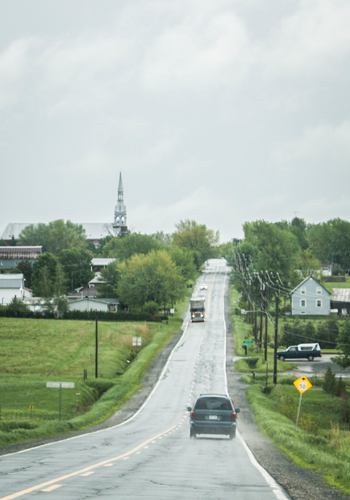
- Road 255 towards Wotton

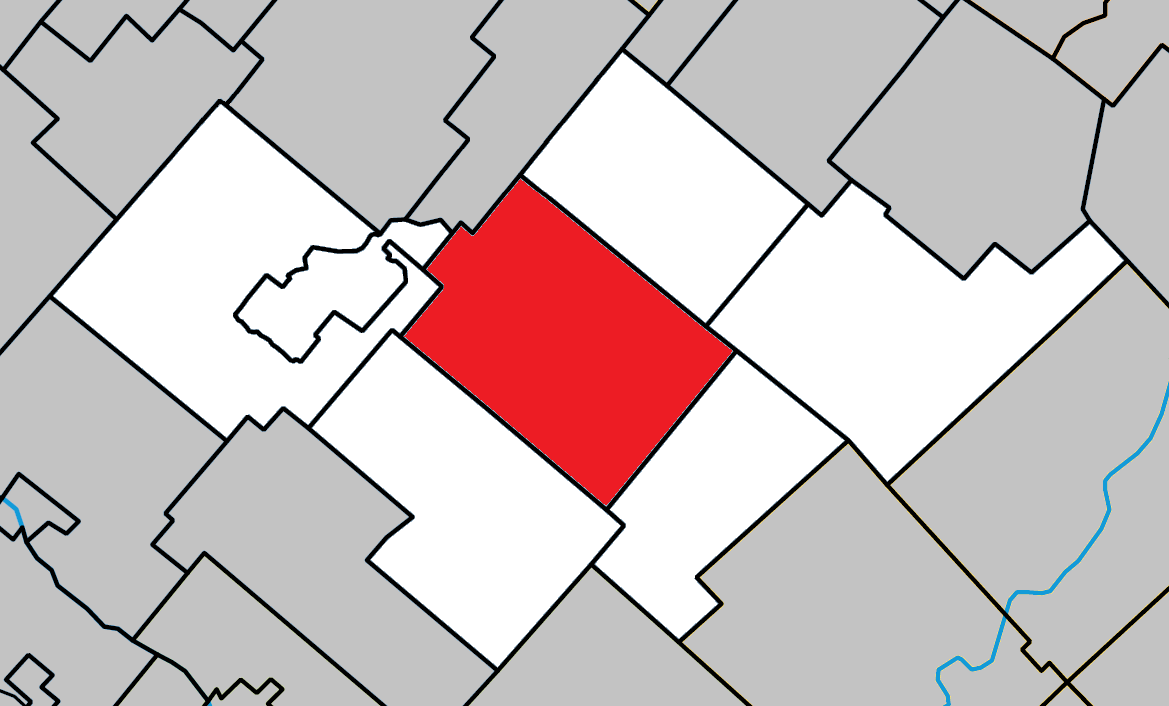
- Location within Les Sources RCM.

- Location in southern Quebec.
- Coordinates: 45°44′N 71°48′W
- Country: Canada
- Province: Quebec
- Region: Estrie
- RCM: Les Sources
- Constituted: March 10, 1993

Government
  - Mayor: Jocelyn Dion
  - Federal riding: Richmond—Arthabaska—des-Sources
  - Prov. riding: Mégantic

Area
  - Total: 144.70 km^{2} (55.87 sq mi)
  - Land: 143.15 km^{2} (55.27 sq mi)

Population (2021)
  - Total: 1,402
  - Density: 9.8/km^{2} (25/sq mi)
  - Pop 2016–2021: ▼2.0%
- Time zone: UTC−5 (EST)
  - Summer (DST): UTC−4 (EDT)
- Postal code(s): J0A 1N0
- Area code: 819
- Highways: R-216; R-255
- Website: wotton.ca

Wotton is a municipality in Quebec, Canada.

== History ==
Wotton was the first French-speaking township to be cleared in 1849. This community was therefore the first to break free from the seigneurial system. Wotton became center of agricultural experimentation in Quebec during the tenure of Louis-Hippolyte La Fontaine, who was appointed Minister of Colonization at the time of Lower Canada. The village held the first edition of its Traditions Festival on August 12, 2006. The festival is now known as Festival du Québec défricheur (Quebec Pioneer Festival).
