= Les Sources Regional County Municipality =

Les Sources
- Regional county municipality
- Coordinates: 45°44′N 71°48′W
- Country: Canada
- Province: Quebec
- Region: Estrie
- Effective: January 1, 1982
- County seat: Val-des-Sources

Government
  - Type: Prefecture
  - Prefect: Hugues Grimard

Area
  - Total: 792.90 km^{2} (306.14 sq mi)
  - Land: 787.13 km^{2} (303.91 sq mi)

Population (2016)
  - Total: 14,286
  - Density: 18.1/km^{2} (47/sq mi)
  - Change 2011-2016: ▼3.2%
- Time zone: UTC−5 (EST)
  - Summer (DST): UTC−4 (EDT)
- Area code: 819
- Website: www.mrcdessources.com

Les Sources (French pronunciation: [le suʁs]) is a regional county municipality in the Estrie region of Quebec, Canada. The seat is the city of Val-des-Sources. Before April 22, 2006, it was known as Asbestos regional county municipality, and before August 1990 it was known as L'Or-Blanc regional county municipality (French: white gold).

The Asbestos strike, a critical part of Quebec's labour history, occurred in the region.

== Subdivisions ==
There are 7 subdivisions within the RCM:

Cities & Towns (2)

- Danville
- Val-des-Sources

Municipalities (4)

- Ham-Sud
- Saint-Adrien
- Saint-Georges-de-Windsor
- Wotton

Townships (1)

- Saint-Camille

== Demographics ==
=== Population ===
Population trend:

| Census | Population | Change (%) |
|---|---|---|
| 2016 | 14,286 | ▼3.2% |
| 2011 | 14,756 | ▲2.0% |
| 2006 | 14,466 | ▼0.5% |
| 2001 | 14,535 | ▼3.1% |
| 1996 | 15,005 | ▼2.4% |
| 1991 | 15,381 | N/A |

=== Language ===
Mother tongue (2016)

| Language | Population | Pct (%) |
|---|---|---|
| French only | 13,485 | 95.3% |
| English only | 420 | 3.0% |
| English and French | 90 | 0.6% |
| Other languages | 150 | 1.1% |

== Transportation ==
=== Access Routes ===
Highways and numbered routes that run through the municipality, including external routes that start or finish at the county border:

- Autoroutes
  - None
- Principal Highways
  - R-116
- Secondary Highways
  - R-216
  - R-249
  - R-255
  - R-257
- External Routes
  - None

== Attractions ==
- Burbank Pond Natural Interpretation Centre (Danville)
- Asbestos Musical Camp (Val-des-Sources)
- JM Asbestos Mine Visit (Val-des-Sources)
- The Little Happiness of Saint-Camille (Saint-Camille)
- Mineralogical Museum, and Museum Mine History (Val-des-Sources)
- Mont-Ham full air Centre (Saint-Joseph-de-Ham-Sud)

== See also ==
- List of regional county municipalities and equivalent territories in Quebec
