= Valcourt, Quebec =

Valcourt, Quebec refers to two distinct entities:

- Valcourt (township), a township municipality in Quebec, Canada
- Valcourt (city), a city enclaved within the township
