= Lévesque River =

River in Centre-du-Québec, Quebec (Canada)

- Native name: Rivière Lévesque (French)

Location
- Country: Canada
- Province: Quebec
- Region: Centre-du-Québec
- MRC: Nicolet-Yamaska Regional County Municipality
- Municipality: Saint-Elphège and Pierreville, Baie-du-Febvre

Physical characteristics
- Source: Agricultural streams
  - location: Saint-Elphège
  - coordinates: 46.06332°N 72.73169°W
  - elevation: 40 m (130 ft)
- Mouth: Lake Saint-Pierre, St. Lawrence River
  - location: Baie-du-Febvre
  - coordinates: 46.14056°N 72.80167°W
  - elevation: 6 m (20 ft)
- Length: 11.8 km (7.3 mi)

Basin features
- Tributaries
  - left: (upstream)
  - right: (upstream) Décharge Bourassa

The Lévesque River is a tributary on the south shore of Lake Saint-Pierre which is crossed to the northeast by the St. Lawrence River. The Lévesque river crosses the municipalities of Saint-Elphège, Pierreville and Baie-du-Febvre, in the Nicolet-Yamaska Regional County Municipality (MRC), in the administrative region of Centre-du-Québec, in Quebec, in Canada.

== Geography ==
The main neighboring hydrographic slopes of the Lévesque River are:

- north side: Lake Saint-Pierre, St. Lawrence River;
- east side: Colbert River, Nicolet River, Nicolet South-West River;
- south side: Saint-François River;
- west side: Saint-François River.

The Lévesque river draws its source from agricultural and forest streams, such as the Fortunat-Veilleux stream and the Bourassa discharge, which drain an area located near the northeast shore of the Saint-François River.

The course of the Lévesque River runs north-west parallel (on the east side) to the Saint-François River and parallel (on the west side) to the Colbert River. The Lévesque River flows through agricultural areas in Saint-Elphège, Pierreville and Baie-du-Febvre, crossing route 226, rang Sainte-Anne road, route 132 and rang du Petit-Bois road.

The Lévesque River flows on the south shore of lac Saint-Pierre, to the west of the small bay designated "Le Fer à Cheval" (staging area for birds) and to the west of the village of Baie-du-Febvre.

== Toponymy ==
The term "Lévesque" constitutes a family name of French origin.

The toponym "Rivière Lévesque" was formalized on December 5, 1968, at the Commission de toponymie du Québec.

== See also ==
- List of rivers of Quebec
