= Rivière des Frères =

River in Centre-du-Québec, Quebec (Canada)

Location
- Country: Canada
- Province: Quebec
- Region: Centre-du-Québec
- MRC: Nicolet-Yamaska Regional County Municipality
- Municipality: Baie-du-Febvre

Physical characteristics
- Source: Agricultural streams
  - location: Baie-du-Febvre
  - coordinates: 46.10645°N 72.701022°W
  - elevation: 41 m (135 ft)
- Mouth: Lake Saint-Pierre, St. Lawrence River
  - location: Baie-du-Febvre
  - coordinates: 46.16611°N 72.73194°W
  - elevation: 6 m (20 ft)
- Length: 4.0 km (2.5 mi)

Basin features
- Tributaries
  - left: (upstream)
  - right: (upstream)

The rivière des Frères (in English: Brothers river) is a tributary on the south shore of lake Saint-Pierre, which is crossed to the northeast by the St. Lawrence River. The rivière des Frères flows in the municipality of Baie-du-Febvre, in the Nicolet-Yamaska Regional County Municipality (MRC), in the administrative region of Centre-du-Québec, in Québec, in Canada.

== Geography ==
The main hydrographic slopes near the Rivière des Frères are:

- north side: Lake Saint-Pierre, St. Lawrence River;
- east side: Brielle river, Nicolet River, Nicolet South-West River;
- south side: Landroche River, Saint-François River;
- west side: Landroche River, Colbert River, Saint-François River.

The "rivière des Frères" draws its source from agricultural streams located in the territory of the municipality of Baie-du-Febvre, southeast of the village, northeast of route 255, between chemin du Pays Brûlé and rang de la Grande Plaine.

The "rivière des Frères" flows on 4.0 kilometres (2.5 mi) towards the north-west in an agricultural zone, passing north-east of the village of Baie-du-Febvre, and crosses the route 132. At the end of the course, the river crosses the firing range of the Ministry of National Defense.

The "rivière des Frères" flows over the "Battures des Frères" on the south shore of Lake Saint-Pierre, downstream from "La Longue Pointe", north-west of the village of Baie-du-Febvre. The confluence of the "rivière des Frères" is located 1.6 kilometres (0.99 mi) southwest of the confluence of the Brielle river.

== Toponymy ==
The toponym "rivière des Frères" was made official on August 28, 1980, at the Commission de toponymie du Québec.

== See also ==
- List of rivers of Quebec
