= Landroche River =

River in Centre-du-Québec, Quebec (Canada)

- Native name: Rivière Landroche (French)

Location
- Country: Canada
- Province: Quebec
- Region: Centre-du-Québec
- MRC: Nicolet-Yamaska Regional County Municipality
- Municipality: Saint-Elphège and Baie-du-Febvre

Physical characteristics
- Source: Agricultural streams
  - location: Baie-du-Febvre
  - coordinates: 46.10637°N 72.70352°W
  - elevation: 30 m (98 ft)
- Mouth: Lake Saint-Pierre, St. Lawrence River
  - location: Baie-du-Febvre
  - coordinates: 46.15305°N 72.76889°W
  - elevation: 6 m (20 ft)
- Length: 10.0 km (6.2 mi)

Basin features
- Tributaries
  - left: (upstream) cours d'eau des Trente, ruisseau Roland-Lemire, cours d'eau Dionne
  - right: (upstream) ruisseau Bourgoin, cours d'eau Geoffroy

The Landroche River is a tributary on the south shore of Lake Saint-Pierre which is crossed to the northeast by the St. Lawrence River. The Landroche river flows in the municipality of Baie-du-Febvre, in the Nicolet-Yamaska Regional County Municipality (MRC), in the administrative region of Centre-du-Quebec, in Quebec, in Canada.

== Geography ==
The main neighboring hydrographic slopes of the Landroche river are:

- north side: Lake Saint-Pierre, St. Lawrence River;
- east side: Rivière des Frères, Nicolet River, Nicolet Southwest River;
- south side: Lévesque River, Saint-François River;
- west side: Colbert River, Lévesque River, Saint-François River.

The Landroche river draws its source from agricultural streams located in the territory of the municipality of Baie-du-Febvre, almost at the limit of Saint-Elphège. The Landroche river begins at the confluence of the Roland-Lemire stream and the Geoffroy stream. This confluence is located on the municipal boundary of Saint-Elphège and Baie-du-Febvre.

From its source, the course of the Landroche river flows on 10 kilometres (6.2 mi) towards the north-west, generally in an agricultural zone, with a drop of 24 kilometres (15 mi). The course of the river intersects Chemin du Pays-Brûlé, route 132 and Chemin des Huit.

The Landroche River flows northwest in an agricultural zone, crossing route 132. The river empties on the flats of Pierre à Chaux on the south shore of Lake Saint-Pierre, near Pointe Gabriel, north-east of the village of Baie-du-Febvre.

== Toponymy ==
The toponym "rivière Landroche" was made official on August 8, 1980, at the Commission de toponymie du Québec.

== See also ==
- List of rivers of Quebec
