= Grande-Île Wildlife Refuge =

Wildlife refuge in Saint-Ignace-de-Loyola, Quebec

- Location within Quebec
- Location: Canada, Quebec, D'Autray Regional County Municipality
- Nearest city: Berthierville
- Coordinates: 46°07′25″N 73°01′40″W
- Area: 145
- Authorized: Ministère des Ressources naturelles et de la Faune du Québec
- Created: 1992

The Grande-île Wildlife Refuge is a protected area of Quebec located in Saint-Ignace-de-Loyola in the D'Autray Regional County Municipality and one of the province's 11 wildlife refuges. This site on Great Island protects one of the largest Heron of North America. In French, it is called Refuge faunique de la Grande-Île. It is about 50 hectares.

== See also ==
=== Related Articles ===
- Archipelago of Saint-Pierre Lake
- Lake Saint-Pierre
- St. Lawrence River
