= Colbert River =

River in Centre-du-Québec, Quebec (Canada)

- Native name: Rivière Colbert (French)

Location
- Country: Canada
- Province: Quebec
- Region: Centre-du-Québec
- MRC: Nicolet-Yamaska Regional County Municipality
- Municipality: Saint-Elphège and Baie-du-Febvre

Physical characteristics
- Source: Agricultural streams
  - location: Saint-Elphège
  - coordinates: 46.09818°N 72.73102°W
  - elevation: 40 m (130 ft)
- Mouth: Lake Saint-Pierre, St. Lawrence River
  - location: Baie-du-Febvre
  - coordinates: 46.14889°N 72.77333°W
  - elevation: 6 m (20 ft)
- Length: 12.6 km (7.8 mi)

Basin features
- Tributaries
  - left: (upstream) Ruisseau de la Commune, cours d'eau Grande Ligne, ruisseau Fortunat Veilleux
  - right: (upstream) Cours d'eau Gouin

The Colbert river (in French: rivière Colbert) is a tributary on the southeast shore of lake Saint-Pierre which is crossed to the northeast by the St. Lawrence River. The Colbert river crosses the municipalities of Saint-Elphège and Baie-du-Febvre, in the Nicolet-Yamaska Regional County Municipality (MRC), in the administrative region of Centre-du-Québec, in Quebec.

== Geography ==
The main neighboring hydrographic slopes of the Colbert river are:

- north side: Lake Saint-Pierre, St. Lawrence River;
- east side: Landroche River, Nicolet River, Nicolet South-West River, Saint-Zéphirin River;
- south side: Saint-François River;
- west side: Lévesque River, Saint-François River.

The Colbert river draws its head waters from various agricultural streams (notably the Fronteau stream, Daneau stream and cours d'eau Grande Ligne) near the Chemin du rang de la Grande-Plaine, in the municipality of Saint-Zéphirin-de-Courval. This head area is located west of the village of Saint-Elphège, west of the village of Saint-Zéphirin-de-Courval and northeast of the Saint-François River.

The course of the Colbert River descends on 12.6 kilometres (7.8 mi) generally northwest into an agricultural zone, with a drop of 34 metres (112 ft), according to these segments:

- 7.8 kilometres (4.8 mi) north-west, forming small serpentines in an agricultural zone and crossing a few forest islets, crossing Chemin du Pays-Brûlé, up to route 132 (route Marie-Victorin);
- 4.8 kilometres (3.0 mi) first to the north, then to the north-west, in an agricultural zone, crossing the Chemin des Huit, up to its mouth.

The Colbert river empties onto the Batture de la Pierre à Chaux, on the south shore of lake Saint-Pierre, to the southwest of the confluence of the Landroche River, to the northeast of the confluence of the Lévesque River and west of the village of Baie-du-Febvre.

== Toponymy ==
The term "Colbert" constitutes a family name of French origin.

The toponym "Rivière Colbert" was formalized on December 5, 1968, at the Commission de toponymie du Québec.

== See also ==
- List of rivers of Quebec
