= Lorenzo de Nevers =

Canadian painter

Lorenzo de Nevers (June 13, 1877 – March 29, 1967) was a Canadian painter.

== Early life ==
One of sixteen Children of Abraham Boisvert and Marie Biron, he was born at Baie-du-Febvre (today called Saint-Elphège), in Yamaska, Quebec.

== Education ==
In 1898 his family moved to Rhode Island, where his parents registered him in drawing courses in the Rhode Island School of Design. In 1899 he moved to Paris to study art. In Paris, under the supervision of Benjamin Constant and Jean-Paul Laurens, he followed studied for two years at the Julian Academy. He was a colleague of Pablo Picasso and Borduas.

According to Rosaire Dion-Lévesque, Lorenzo was admitted to Paris Fine Arts in 1902. He spent ten years under the supervision of painting masters such as Gabriel Ferrier and Léon Bonnat. He came ninth of 400 participants when he competed for the Prix de Rome, with a painting titled The escape to Egypt.

== Career ==
He left Europe for good in 1914 because of the war and established himself in Central Falls where his brothers were. Then he moved in turn to Providence, New York, Central Park South where he stayed for 17 years and then Montreal for few years. In 1952 he came back to Central Falls.

In the United States he painted the portraits of Franklin D. Roosevelt and Dwight D. Eisenhower, and Thomas E. Dewey, New York's governor, and Aram J. Pothier, Rhode Island's governor.

He decorated Sacred Heart Cathedral (Roman Catholic) in Prince Albert, Saskatchewan, and the private chapel of Mgr Prudhomme.

In Montreal, he painted former prime ministers such as Sir Wilfrid Laurier and Louis Stephen Saint-Laurent; then Jacob Nichols, Cardinal Léger, Esioff Patenaude, lieutenant-governor (the painting disappeared in the fire at Bois de Coulonge on February 20, 1966), and the former Montreal mayor, Camillien Houde

== Later life ==
On Sunday, February 25, 1962, in Pawtucket, Rhode Island, he was decorated with the medal from ‘Ordre du Mérite Franco-Américain’.

He died March 29, 1967, in Woonsocket, Rhode Island.
