= Berthier (Province of Canada electoral district) =

Electoral district in former Province of Canada

Coordinates: 46°8′30″N 73°13′0″W

Berthier Canada East
Province of Canada electoral district

Defunct pre-Confederation electoral district
- Legislature: Legislative Assembly of the Province of Canada
- District created: 1841
- District abolished: 1867
- First contested: 1841
- Last contested: 1863

Berthier (French pronunciation: [bɛʁtje]) was an electoral district of the Legislative Assembly of the Parliament of the Province of Canada, in Canada East, on the north shore of the Saint Lawrence River. It was created in 1841, based on the previous electoral district of the same name for the Legislative Assembly of Lower Canada.

Berthier was represented by one member in the Legislative Assembly. It was abolished in 1867, upon the creation of Canada and the province of Quebec.

== Boundaries ==
Berthier electoral district was located on the north shore of the Saint Lawrence River, between Montreal and Trois-Rivières, in the area now known as D'Autray Regional County Municipality. The town of Berthier was the main town in the electoral district.

The Union Act, 1840 merged the two provinces of Upper Canada and Lower Canada into the Province of Canada, with a single Parliament. The separate parliaments of Lower Canada and Upper Canada were abolished. The Union Act provided that the pre-existing electoral boundaries of Lower Canada and Upper Canada would continue to be used in the new Parliament, unless altered by the Union Act itself.

The Berthier electoral district of Lower Canada was not altered by the Act, and therefore continued with the same boundaries which had been set by a statute of Lower Canada in 1829:

The County of Berthier shall be bounded on the north east by the County of Saint Maurice hereunder described, on the south west by the said County of Lachenaie, on the north west by the northern boundary of the Province, and on the south east by the said River Saint Lawrence, and shall include all the Islands on the said River Saint Lawrence, nearest to the said County, and in the whole or in part, fronting the same; which County so bounded, comprises the Seigniories of Berthier and its augmentation, Du Sablé or York, and part of Masquinongé, Fief Chicot and the Seigniories of Lanoraye, Dautray and their augmentations, the Seigniories of Lavaltrie and its augmentation, and the Seigniories of Daillebout and De Ramsay, and the Township of Brandon, and part of the Seigniory of Lanaudière, and the Township of Kildare, and the Islands of Saint Ignace and du Pads.

== Members of the Legislative Assembly ==
Berthier was a single-member constituency.

The following were the members of the Legislative Assembly from Berthier. "Party" was a fluid concept, especially during the early years of the Province of Canada. Party affiliations are based on the biographies of individual members given by the National Assembly of Quebec, as well as votes in the Legislative Assembly.

Parliament	Member	Years in Office	Party
1st Parliament; 1841–1844	David Morrison Armstrong	1841–1844	Groupe canadien-français, later Reformer

== Abolition ==
The district was abolished on July 1, 1867, when the British North America Act, 1867 came into force, splitting the Province of Canada into Quebec and Ontario. It was succeeded by electoral districts of the same name in the House of Commons of Canada and the Legislative Assembly of Quebec.
