= Richelieu (Province of Canada electoral district) =

Electoral district in former Province of Canada

Province of Canada electoral district

Defunct pre-Confederation electoral district
- Legislature: Legislative Assembly of the Province of Canada
- District created: 1841
- District abolished: 1867
- First contested: 1841
- Last contested: 1863

Richelieu was an electoral district of the Legislative Assembly of the Parliament of the Province of Canada, in Canada East, in the Richelieu River valley, north-east of Montreal. It was created in 1841 and was based on the previous electoral district of the same name for the Legislative Assembly of Lower Canada. It was represented by one member in the Legislative Assembly.

The electoral district was abolished in 1867, upon the creation of Canada and the province of Quebec.

== Boundaries ==
The Union Act, 1840 merged the two provinces of Lower Canada and Upper Canada into the Province of Canada, with a single Parliament. The separate parliaments of Lower Canada and Upper Canada were abolished.

The Union Act provided that the pre-existing electoral boundaries of Lower Canada and Upper Canada would continue to be used in the new Parliament, unless altered by the Union Act itself. The Richelieu electoral district of Lower Canada was not altered by the Act, and therefore continued with the same boundaries which had been set by a statute of Lower Canada in 1829:

The County of Richelieu shall be bounded by the north east line of the seigniory of Contrecœur as far as the River Richelieu or Chambly, thence by the said River Richelieu up to the south west line of the Seigniory of Saint Charles on the River Richelieu, thence by the said south west line as far as the line of the depth of the said seigniory, thence by the said depth line as far as the north east line of the said seigniory of Saint Charles, thence by the said north east line as far as the depth line of the seigniory of Saint Saint Denis, thence by the said depth line as far as the line between the seigniories of Saint Hyacinthe and Saint Ours, thence by the aforesaid line as far as the River Yamaska, thence by the said River Yamaska as far as the place where the continuation of the rear line of the seigniory of Saint Charles d'Yamaska would terminate at the said River, thence by the said depth line as far as the north east line of the said seigniory of Saint Charles, thence by the said north east line of Saint Charles as far as the River Yamasaka, thence by part of the said River which is between the said north east line of St. Charles and the north east line of the seigniory of Bonsecours, thence by the said north east line of the seigniory of Bonsecours as far as the Baie de la Valliere, thence by a line through the middle of the said Baie as far as its outlet into the River Saint Lawrence, and thence up the river as far as the north east line of the seigniory of Contrecœur; which County shall comprehend the seigniories of Saint Ours and its augmentation, Saint Denis, Saint Charles on the River Richelieu, Sorel, Bourchemin west of the River of Yamaska, Bourg Marie west of the said River Bonsecours and Saint Charles on the River Yamaska, comprehending the following islands in the River Saint Lawrence, that is to say: the Isle Cochon, Madame, Ronde, De Grace, Aux Ours, and the Isles commonly called Battures à la Carpe, and the Isles du Sable, du Moine, and du Basque, and the Isles in the River Richelieu or Chambly nearest the said County, and being in the whole or in part fronting the same.

The electoral district of Richelieu was thus centered on the Richelieu and Yamaska Rivers, south of the Saint Lawrence and north-east of Montreal (now in La Vallée-du-Richelieu Regional County Municipality).

== Members of the Legislative Assembly ==
Richelieu was a single-member constituency.

The following were the members of the Legislative Assembly for Richelieu. "Party" was a fluid concept, especially during the early years of the Province of Canada. Party affiliations are based on the biographies of individual members given by the National Assembly of Quebec, as well as votes in the Legislative Assembly.

Parliament	Members	Years in Office	Party
1st Parliament; 1841–1844	Denis-Benjamin Viger	1841–1844	Anti-unionist and French-Canadian Group
2nd Parliament; 1844–1847	Wolfred Nelson	1844–1851	"English" Liberal
3rd Parliament; 1848–1851	Wolfred Nelson	1844–1851	"English" Liberal

== Abolition ==
The district was abolished on July 1, 1867, when the British North America Act, 1867 came into force, creating Canada and splitting the Province of Canada into Quebec and Ontario. It was succeeded by electoral districts of the same name in the House of Commons of Canada and the Legislative Assembly of Quebec.
