= Grand-Saint-Esprit =

- Municipality
- Motto(s): Liberté et Bienveillance ("Freedom and Benevolence")
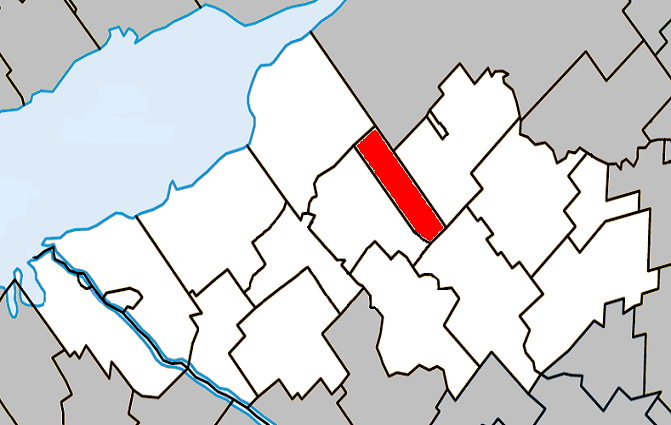
- Location within Nicolet-Yamaska RCM.

- Location in southern Quebec.
- Coordinates: 46°11′N 72°30′W
- Country: Canada
- Province: Quebec
- Region: Centre-du-Québec
- RCM: Nicolet-Yamaska
- Constituted: May 14, 1938

Government
  - Mayor: Sylvain Laroche
  - Federal riding: Bécancour—Nicolet—Saurel—Alnôbak
  - Prov. riding: Nicolet-Bécancour

Area
  - Total: 27.20 km^{2} (10.50 sq mi)
  - Land: 27.14 km^{2} (10.48 sq mi)

Population (2011)
  - Total: 471
  - Density: 17.4/km^{2} (45/sq mi)
  - Pop 2006-2011: ▲1.1%
  - Dwellings: 207
- Time zone: UTC−5 (EST)
  - Summer (DST): UTC−4 (EDT)
- Postal code(s): J0G 1B0
- Area code: 819
- Highways: R-226
- Website: www.grandsaintesprit.qc.ca

Grand-Saint-Esprit (French pronunciation: [ɡʁɑ̃ sɛ̃t‿ɛspʁi]) is a municipality in the Centre-du-Québec region of the province of Quebec in Canada. The population as of the Canada 2011 Census was 471.

== Demographics ==
=== Population ===
Population trend:

Census	Population	Change (%)
2011	471	▲1.1%
2006	466	▼4.7%
2001	489	▼2.0%
1996	499	▼10.3%
1991	556	N/A

=== Language ===
Mother tongue language (2006)

Language	Population	Pct (%)
French only	465	100.00%
English only	0	0.00%
Both English and French	0	0.00%
Other languages	0	0.00%

== See also ==
- List of municipalities in Quebec
