= Saint-Édouard-de-Lotbinière =

- Parish municipality
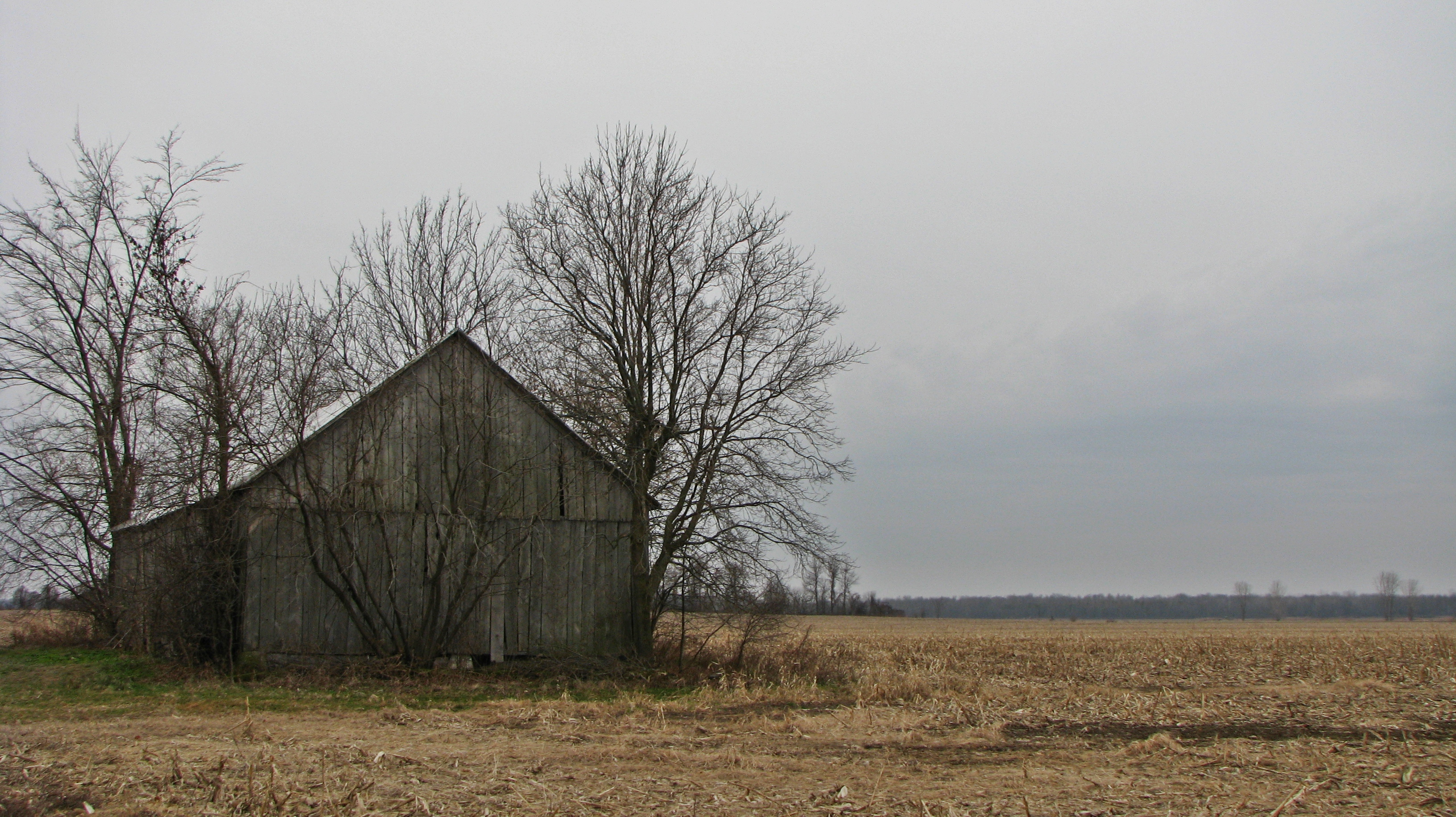
- View of Saint-Édouard-de-Lotbinière

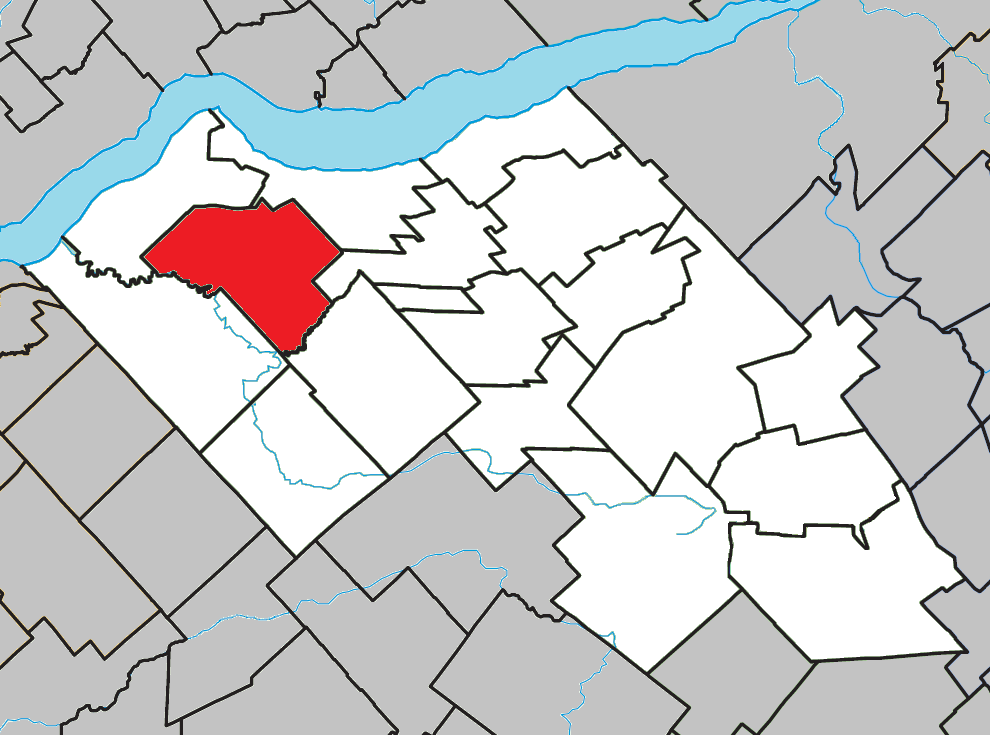
- Location within Lotbinière RCM.

- Location in southern Quebec.
- Coordinates: 46°34′N 71°50′W
- Country: Canada
- Province: Quebec
- Region: Chaudière-Appalaches
- RCM: Lotbinière
- Constituted: December 1, 1862

Government
  - Mayor: Pierre-Luc Daigle
  - Federal riding: Mégantic—L'Érable—Lotbinière
  - Prov. riding: Lotbinière-Frontenac

Area
  - Total: 98.50 km^{2} (38.03 sq mi)
  - Land: 98.43 km^{2} (38.00 sq mi)
- There is an apparent contradiction between two authoritative sources

Population (2021)
  - Total: 1,240
  - Density: 12.6/km^{2} (33/sq mi)
  - Pop 2016-2021: ▲3.9%
  - Dwellings: 557
- Time zone: UTC−5 (EST)
  - Summer (DST): UTC−4 (EDT)
- Postal code(s): G0S 1Y0
- Area codes: 418 and 581
- Highways: R-226
- Website: www.municipalite. st-edouard.qc.ca

Saint-Édouard-de-Lotbinière (French pronunciation: [sɛ̃t‿edwaʁ də lɔtbinjɛʁ]) is a parish municipality in the Lotbinière Regional County Municipality in the Chaudière-Appalaches region of Quebec, Canada. Its population is 1,240 as of the Canada 2021 Census. It is named after Édouard Faucher, founder and first priest of the parish, and René-Louis Chartier de Lotbinière, first owner of the seigneurie in which Saint-Édouard lay.

== Demographics ==
In the 2021 Census of Population conducted by Statistics Canada, Saint-Édouard-de-Lotbinière had a population of 1,240 living in 520 of its 557 total private dwellings, a change of 3.9% from its 2016 population of 1,194. With a land area of 98.43 km^{2} (38.00 sq mi), it had a population density of 12.6/km^{2} (32.6/sq mi) in 2021.
