= Yamachiche River =

Yamachiche River Rivière Yamachiche
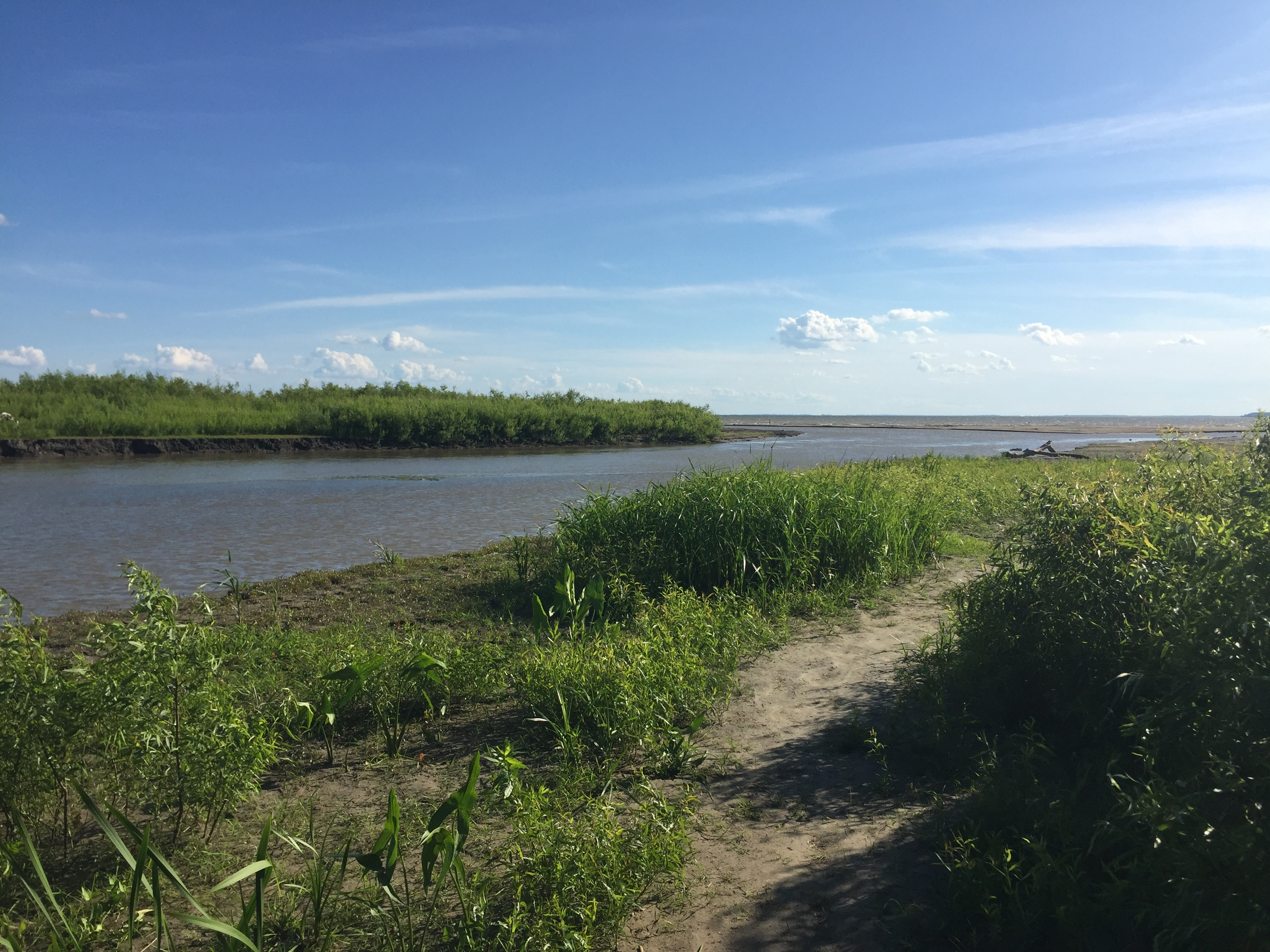
- Yamachiche River at its mouth on North shore of Lake Saint-Pierre

Location
- Country: Canada
- Province: Quebec
- Region: Mauricie

Physical characteristics
- Source: Lac à la Perchaude
  - location: Saint-Élie-de-Caxton, Quebec, Canada
  - coordinates: 46°31′07″N 72°57′49″W
  - elevation: 175 m (574 ft)
- Mouth: Lake Saint-Pierre
  - location: Yamachiche, Mauricie, Quebec, Canada
  - coordinates: 46°09′48″N 73°01′06″W
  - elevation: 5 m (16 ft)
- Length: 45 km (28 mi)
- Basin size: 266 km^{2} (103 sq mi)
- Discharge
  - location: Yamachiche

The Yamachiche River is a river located on the north shore of Lake Saint-Pierre in the Maskinongé Regional County Municipality, in the administrative region of Mauricie, in Quebec, in Canada. It originates in the Mastigouche Wildlife Reserve.

The Yamachiche River flows mostly in a wooded area north of Charette, and then generally in an agricultural environment on the rest of its course.

== Geography ==
The main hydrographic slopes of the Yamachiche River are:

- To the east: the otters river and the clay river;
- The west: the Little Yamachiche River and the River of Loup (Mauricie).

The main body of water at the head of the Yamachiche River is the "Great Long Lake" (length: 2.5 km (1.6 mi) oriented from north to south, altitude: 176 m (577 ft)) located in the municipality of Saint-Élie. He obtains water from three landfills:

- To the northeast: that of Lake Gareau (length: 660 m (2,170 ft), altitude of 183 m (600 ft)), whose discharge flows south. This lake is located in the municipality of Saint-Mathieu-du-Parc;
- To the north: that of the Little Lake Gareau (length: 560 m (1,840 ft), the 600 m (2,000 ft) South. This lake located in the municipality of Saint-Mathieu-du-Parc also receives the waters of Lake Vanasse (altitude: 188 m (617 ft)) on the north side.
- To the northwest: that of a small lake (length: 160 m (520 ft); altitude: 195 m (640 ft)) whose discharge is (length: 160 metres (520 ft); altitude: 195 metres (640 ft)) flowing to the south and receiving the waters by:
  - north of Bournival Lake (length: 220 m (720 ft); altitude: 197 m (646 ft)) whose discharge descends on 1.1 km (0.68 mi);
  - the southwest of the Racquet Lake (length: 0.7 km (0.43 mi), altitude: 225 m (738 ft)) whose discharge is 540 m (1,770 ft). This lake receives from the north the waters of the Second Racquet Lake (length of 0.5 km (0.31 mi); altitude: 233 m (764 ft)) whose discharge is also 540 m (1,770 ft).

Riverside downstream from Grand Lac Long

The Great Lake Long dump is located at the bottom of a bay south of the lake. From there, the Yamachiche River flows on: About 40 m in the "Petit lac Long" (length: 480 m, altitude: 176 m), which flows through 340 m west; 240 m by crossing under a road bridge to go into the Lake Perchaud (length: 1,4 km, altitude: 175 m); 860 m by crossing the lake at la Perchaud, from the north-west to the southeast. A dam has been erected at its mouth. The Lac à la Perchaude receives through its west point the waters of a series of lakes upstream on the north side: Lac des Chutes (length: 0.8 km that the current crosses over 0.6 km, altitude: 209 m) Lac Fer à Cheval (length: 1.0 km from one end to the other, altitude: 209 m), and Lake to the island (length: 1,6 km, altitude: 229 m).

In short, the Second Lac Raquette is the highest lake (233 m) of the watershed of the Yamachiche River; The second being the lake on the Island (229 m); the third being Bournival Lake (220 m).

The course of the river downstream from the lake to the perch

From the perch lake, the river descends 260 meters to the south and flows into Lake Garand (length: 1.2 km facing south, elevation: 172 m). Then the river descends 3.9 km southwest through the village of Saint-Élie to the mouth of the Paterson Lake Creek. From there, the river descends 4.7 km south to the limit of the municipality of Charette, Quebec.

The river then descends to the south, then turns eastwards to cross the village of Charette. Then the river cuts the southwestern limit of Saint-Boniface-de-Shawinigan before crossing Saint-Étienne-des-Grès where it collects the waters of the Machiche River, where it branches off to the southwest. Then its route serves as the limit between Saint-Étienne-des-Grès and Saint-Barnabé.

The river continues southward through the farmland west of the village of Saint-Thomas-de-Caxton. Downstream, the river passes east of the village of Yamachiche to its estuary in Lake Saint-Pierre, where there is also a point and a cove of the same name, 25 km upstream from Trois-Rivières.

In addition, the "Petite rivière Yamachiche" runs for 16 km parallel to the west side; This river takes its source in the area of Saint-Barnabé-Nord. This twin river drains the area of the village of Yamachiche and then flows into Lake Saint-Pierre, 1.5 km upstream from the mouth of the main river.

== Toponymy ==
In the past, this river was called "Rivière Grosbois" because it drains the territory of this former lordship, and "Grande Rivière" or "Rivière d'Yamachiche".

The toponym "Yamachiche River" was officially registered on December 5, 1968, at the "Banque des noms de lieux" (Place names bank) of the Commission de toponymie du Québec (Quebec Toponymy Board).

== See also ==
- Maskinongé Regional County Municipality (RCM)
- Saint-Élie-de-Caxton, a municipality
- Charette, a municipality
- Saint-Boniface, a municipality
- Saint-Étienne-des-Grès, a municipality
- Yamachiche, a municipality
- Saint Lawrence River
- List of rivers of Quebec

== Bibliography ==
- "Watershed Master Plan of the River du Loup", chapter "Name of the river basin organization of the Loup and Yamachiche rivers", Yamachiche, 2011, page 395 (in French)
