= La Visitation-de-l'Île-Dupas =

- Municipality
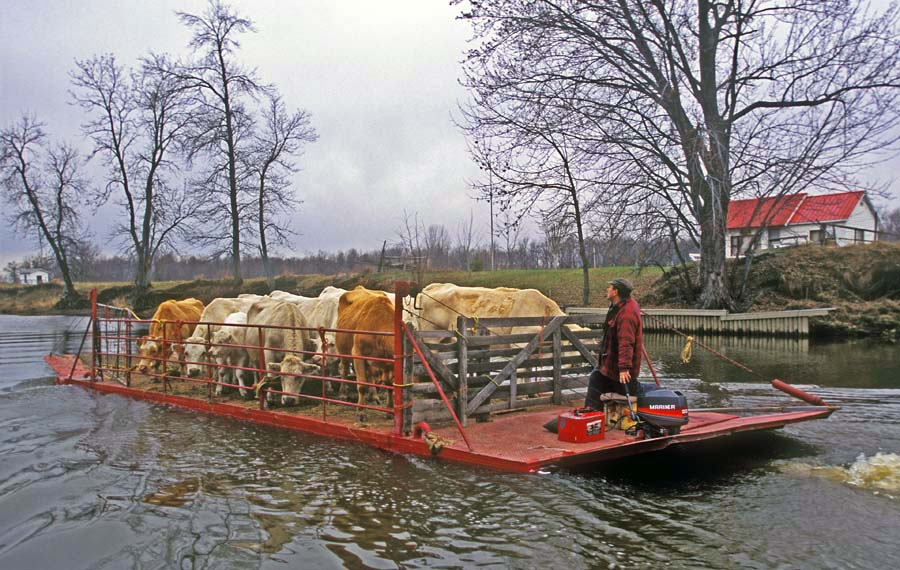
- In the summer the islands are used as grazing pastures

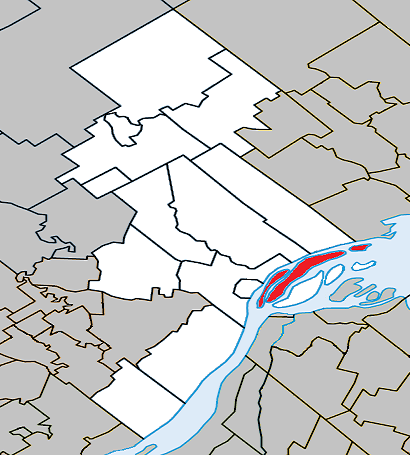
- Location within D'Autray RCM

- Location in central Quebec
- Coordinates: 46°05′N 73°09′W
- Country: Canada
- Province: Quebec
- Region: Lanaudière
- RCM: D'Autray
- Settled: 1699
- Constituted: July 1, 1855

Government
  - Mayor: Alain Goyette
  - Fed. riding: Berthier—Maskinongé
  - Prov. riding: Berthier

Area
  - Total: 37.28 km^{2} (14.39 sq mi)
  - Land: 28.15 km^{2} (10.87 sq mi)

Population (2021)
  - Total: 684
  - Density: 24.3/km^{2} (63/sq mi)
  - Change 2016-21: ▲9.3%
  - Dwellings: 338
- Time zone: UTC−5 (EST)
  - Summer (DST): UTC−4 (EDT)
- Postal code(s): J0K 2P0
- Area codes: 450, 579
- Highways: R-158
- Website: ile-dupas.ca

La Visitation-de-l'Île-Dupas (French pronunciation: [la vizitasjɔ̃ də lil dypa]) is a municipality in the Lanaudière region of Quebec, Canada, part of the D'Autray Regional County Municipality. Its territory is located on several of the Sorel Islands in the Saint Lawrence River where it flows into Lac Saint-Pierre. The largest of these islands is Dupas Island (Île Dupas), also known as Isle du Pads (or Isle du Pas), Île d'Angoulème, and Île du Richelieu at various times in the past.

The area is known for its geese, ducks, and muskrats, and it is suitable for farming, hunting and fishing.

== History ==
The islands were already well known by the indigenous people as a good fishing and hunting location, and they used them to counter repeated attacks by the French.

The first Frenchman settling on the largest island was reputedly Pierre Dupas (1637-1677), officier in the Carignan Regiment who arrived in Canada in 1665. Together with two servants, he settled in 1669 on the island which came to bear his name, and he became the first Lord of the l'Île-Dupas-et-du-Chicot Seignory in 1672. In 1677, his widow sold the seignory to Charles Aubert de La Chesnaye.

On November 10, 1690, Louis Dandonneau, Sieur Du Sablé, and his brother-in-law, Jacques Brisset de Courchesne, both from Champlain, Quebec, purchased the seigneurie of l'Île-du-Pas-et-du-Chicot from Aubert at the cost of 1,500 livres. The following decade saw permanent settlement begin on the island. From 1712 to 1727, explorer Pierre Gaultier de Varennes, sieur de La Vérendrye, lived on the island and his five children were born there.

In 1834, the Parish of L'Isle-du-Pads was founded, followed by the civil parish in 1842. In 1845, the Municipality of L'Isle-du-Pads was established, but abolished in 1847, when it became part of the Berthier County Municipality. In 1855, it was reestablished as a parish municipality called La Visitation-de-la-Sainte-Vierge-de-l'Isle-du-Pads, one of the longest place names in Quebec history.

In 1865, the area experienced a flood which killed 15 people and washed away 27 houses. By the end of the 19th century, more than 1,000 people lived on the island, and in the early 20th century, almost the entire island was used for growing hay, which was exported to the United States in large quantities.

In 1897, the municipality lost about half of its territory when the new Parish Municipality of Saint-Ignace-de-Loyola was formed. In 1981, the parish municipality abbreviated its name and changed its status to become the Municipality of La Visitation-de-l'Île-Dupas.

== Demographics ==
Historical census populations – La Visitation-de-l'Île-Dupas

Year	Pop.	±%
1871	1,005	—
1881	1,356	+34.9%
1891	1,356	+0.0%
1901	448	−67.0%
1911	429	−4.2%
1921	401	−6.5%
1931	430	+7.2%
1941	396	−7.9%

Year	Pop.	±%
1951	429	+8.3%
1956	423	−1.4%
1961	435	+2.8%
1966	441	+1.4%
1971	460	+4.3%
1976	514	+11.7%
1981	514	+0.0%
1986	519	+1.0%

Year	Pop.	±%
1991	521	+0.4%
1996	564	+8.3%
2001	573	+1.6%
2006	612	+6.8%
2011	619	+1.1%
2016	626	+1.1%
2021	684	+9.3%

Source: Statistics Canada

Private dwellings occupied by usual residents (2021): 308 (total dwellings: 338)

Mother tongue (2021):

- English as first language: 0.7%
- French as first language: 97.8%
- English and French as first languages: 0.7%
- Other as first language: 0.7%

== Government ==
List of former mayors:

- Pierre Massé (1855–1858)
- Narcisse Sylvestre (1858–1860, 1882–1885)
- Olivier Valois (1860–1862)
- Gilbert Hérard (1862–1864)
- Henry Brissette Courchesne (1864–1868)
- Pierre Valois (1868–1870)
- Pierre Casaubon (1870–1872)
- Pierre Cardin (1872–1874)
- Olivier Désy (1874–1876)
- Didace Guévremont (1876–1877, 1895–1896)
- Pierre Désy (1877–1879)
- Louis-David Dandonneau (1879–1882)
- Louis-Michel Désy (1885–1886)
- Louis Plante (1886–1889)
- Zotique Courchesne (1889–1895, 1896–1899)
- Édouard Casaubon (1899–1901)
- Joseph Joinville (1901–1905)
- Rémy Valois (1905–1908)
- Louis Honoré Candide Farly (1908–1910, 1921–1923)
- Joseph-Stanislas Sylvestre (1910–1912)
- Joseph Lactance Télesphore Farly (1912–1913)
- Louis-Joseph Laforest (1913–1915)
- Omer Désy (1915–1916)
- P.-Victor Sylvestre (1916–1921)
- Narcisse Valois (1923–1925)
- Édouard Courchesne (1925–1927)
- Pierre Sylvestre (1927–1929)
- Joseph Arsène Léon Farly (1929–1931)
- Adrien Désy (1931–1933)
- Hector Dandonneau (1933–1935)
- Philippe Courchesne (1935–1937)
- Joseph Hérard (1937–1939)
- Joseph Edouard Avila Farly (1939)
- L.-J.-Gérard Sylvestre (1939–1945)
- Antonio DeGrandpré (1945–1947)
- Germain Cardin (1947–1953)
- Armand DeGrandpré (1953–1955)
- Horace Chevalier (1955–1959)
- Émile Courchesne (1959–1961)
- Armand Désy (1961–1970)
- Léon Drainville (1970–1981)
- Maurice Désy (1981–2013)
- François Drainville (2013–2017)
- Marie-Pier Aubuchon (2017–2021)
- Alain Goyette (2021–present)

== Education ==
The Sir Wilfrid Laurier School Board operates anglophone public schools, including:

- Joliette Elementary School in Saint-Charles-Borromée
- Joliette High School in Joliette

== See also ==
- List of municipalities in Quebec
