= David Morrison Armstrong =

Politician in Lower Canada and Province of Canada

Member of the Legislative Assembly of the Province of Canada for Berthier
- In office 1841–1851
- Preceded by: New position
- Succeeded by: Joseph-Hilarion Jobin

Member of the Legislative Council of the Province of Canada, Sorel Division
- In office 1855–1867

Member of the Legislative Council of Quebec, Sorel Division
- In office 1867–1873
- Preceded by: New position
- Succeeded by: Pierre-Euclide Roy

Personal details
- Born: 1805 Maskinongé
- Died: April 14, 1873 (aged 67–68) Sorel
- Resting place: St Pierre church, Sorel
- Party: French-Canadian Group; Reformer; Conservative
- Spouse: Léocadie Deligny
- Relations: Jacques Deligny (father-in-law)
- Children: 1 daughter
- Occupation: Merchant; insurance agent

Military service
- Allegiance: Britain
- Branch/service: Lower Canada militia
- Rank: Lieutenant-Colonel
- Unit: 4th Battalion, Berthier Militia

David Morrison Armstrong (1805 – April 14, 1873) was a merchant, insurance agent and political figure in Canada East in the Province of Canada (now Quebec). He represented the electoral district of Berthier in the Legislative Assembly of the Province of Canada from 1841 to 1851. From 1855 to 1867 he sat in the Legislative Council of the Province of Canada, and in the Legislative Council of Quebec from 1867 until his death. He initially opposed the union of the Lower Canada and Upper Canada into the Province of Canada, and supported the reform movement for responsible government. After responsible government was achieved, he gradually became a Conservative.

== Family and business career ==
Armstrong was born in Maskinongé, the son of Edmond Armstrong and Elizabeth Dunn. His father had been a captain in the Royal Navy, serving during the American Revolutionary War, and then was the harbour master of Montreal. His mother's family were United Empire Loyalists who emigrated to Canada. He was educated in part at the English school in Maskinongé.

Around 1824, Armstrong moved with his parents to Berthier, where he established himself as a merchant, as well as an agent for insurance companies. He married Léocadie Deligny in 1831. She was the daughter of Jacques Deligny, who had been a member in the Legislative Assembly of Lower Canada for over twenty years, first for the district of Warwick, and then for Berthier.

Armstrong was a justice of the peace and a commissioner for the trial of Small Causes. He entered the militia, eventually becoming lieutenant-colonel of the 4th Battalion of the Berthier Militia.

His daughter Amélie married Michel Mathieu, who served in the Canadian House of Commons.

== Political career ==
Following the rebellion in Lower Canada, and the similar rebellion in 1837 in Upper Canada (now Ontario), the British government decided to merge the two provinces into a single province, as recommended by Lord Durham in the Durham Report. The Union Act, 1840, passed by the British Parliament, abolished the two provinces and their separate parliaments, and created the Province of Canada, with a single parliament for the entire province, composed of an elected Legislative Assembly and an appointed Legislative Council. The Governor General retained a strong position in the government.

Armstrong stood for election in the first general election in 1841 and was elected to the Legislative Assembly of the new province, representing the electoral district of Berthier. He was re-elected in 1844 and 1848, but defeated in 1851.

In the first session of the first Parliament, elected in 1841, Armstrong was a member of the French-Canadian Group from Canada East, who opposed both the new union of Canada, and the government of Governor General Sydenham. Following Sydenham's death in late 1841, he continued to oppose the government of the new Governor General, Sir Charles Bagot, until Bagot was forced to reorganise his government by taking in Reformers, led by Louis-Hippolyte Lafontaine and Robert Baldwin. Armstrong supported the new government, and also voted in opposition when the Lafontaine–Baldwin ministry felt compelled to resign.

Armstrong subsequently became identified with the Reform group, until his defeat in 1851.

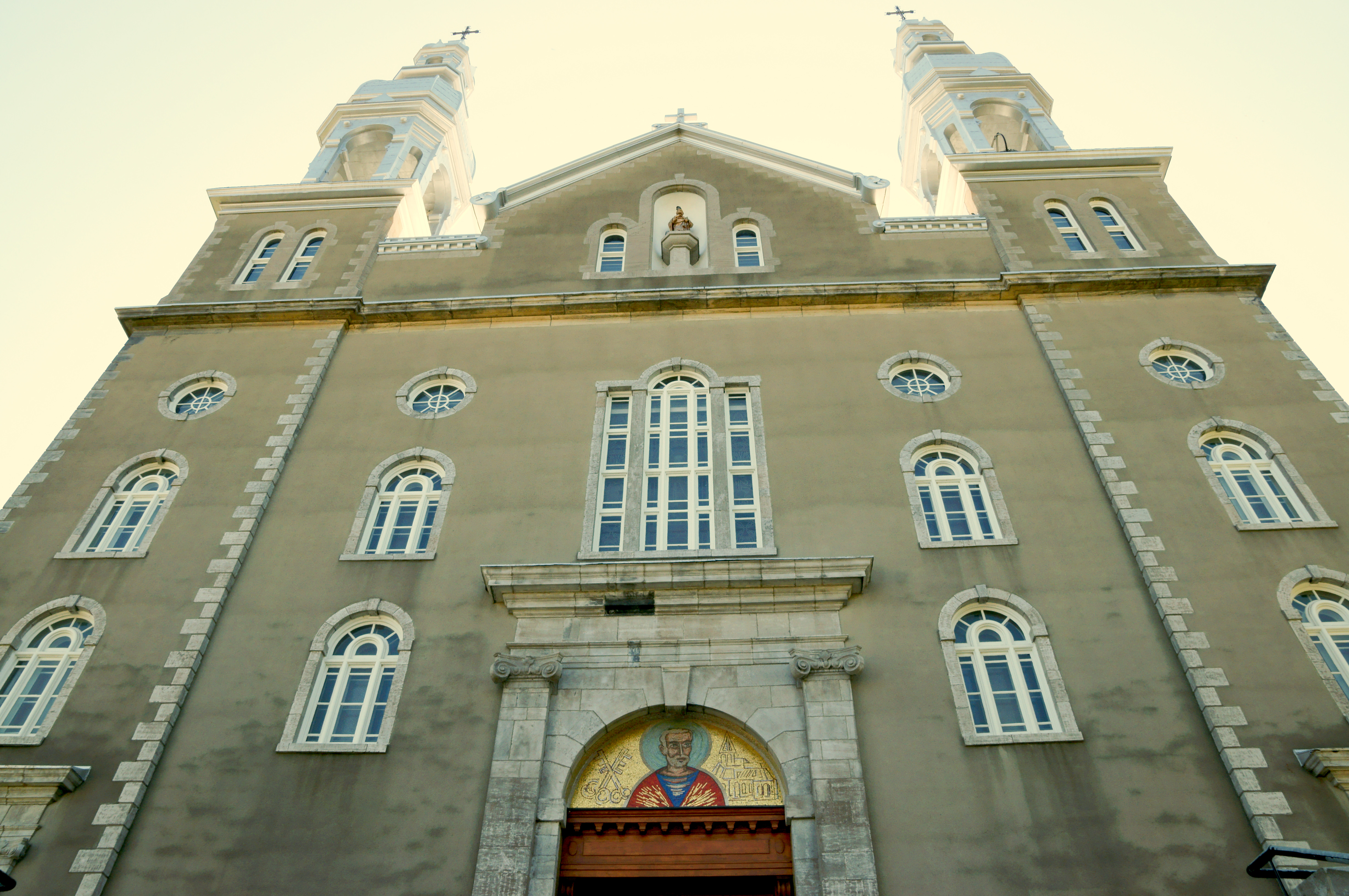
Church of St Pierre at Sorel, where Armstrong is entombed

In 1855, he was named to the Legislative Council of the Province of Canada for the Sorel division and served until Canadian Confederation in 1867, when the province of Quebec was created. He was named to the Legislative Council of Quebec in 1867, again for the Sorel division. By the time he sat in the Legislative Council of Quebec, he was considered a Conservative. He served in the Quebec Legislative Council from 1867 until his death in Sorel in 1873. He was entombed in the vault of the church of St Pierre at Sorel.

== See also ==
1st Parliament of the Province of Canada
