= Proof and Experimental Test Establishment =

- Centre d’essais et d’expérimentation
- Near Nicolet, Quebec in Canada

Site information
- Type: Munitions and Weapons Testing
- Operator: Canadian Army
- Status: Active

Location
- Location of Proof and Experimental Test Establishment
- Coordinates: 46.22124°N 72.64753°W
- Area: ~20 km^{2} (7.7 sq mi)

Site history
- In use: 1952 - Current

Test information
- Remediation: Partial Remediation of Lac Saint-Pierre

The Proof and Experimental Test Establishment (French: Centre d’essais et d’expérimentation, or PETE) is a Canadian Forces military weapons testing facility located west of Nicolet, Quebec on the shore of Lake Saint Pierre. The site is operated by General Dynamics Ordnance and Tactical Systems Canada, a major supplier of ammunition to the Canadian Forces.

== Lake Saint Pierre firing range ==
Between 1952 and 2000, the nearby Lake Saint Pierre was used as a firing range. Munitions testing over this period resulted in the accumulation of over 300,000 shells on the lake floor, approximately 8000 of which are unexploded ordnance. The unexploded shells continue to present a danger to the significant number of year-round recreational users of the lake. Cleanup efforts are additionally impeded by the sheer number of shells. They are also made substantially more difficult due to the great environmental importance and the protected status of the lake according to several international agreements.

The centre still conducts munitions tests close by but no longer in or above the lake.
