= Archipelago of Saint-Pierre Lake =

Archipelago in the Saint Lawrence River in Quebec, Canada

Archipelago of Lake Saint Pierre
Native name: Archipel du Lac Saint-Pierre
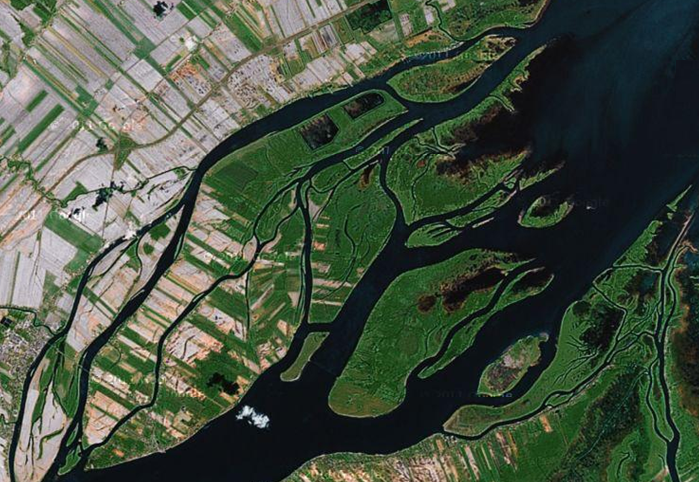
- Satellite view of the Archipelago

- Location within Quebec

Geography
- Location: Saint Lawrence River, Lake Saint Pierre
- Coordinates: 46°05′57″N 73°04′01″W

Administration
- Canada
- Province: Quebec

Demographics
- Population: 2600 (2001)

The Archipelago of Lake Saint Pierre counts 103 islands in the western part of Lake Saint Pierre, in the Canadian province of Quebec. There are two groups: Islands of Berthier to the north and the islands of Sorel to the south.

The shores of this archipelago has twenty-two coastal villages. Around 2600 people were living on those islands in 2011. Islands Dupas and Saint-Ignace-de-Loyola are partially urbanized. The majority of the other islands are used for agriculture and grazing farm animals.

A network of small roads, often unpaved crosses the riparian environment of the islands. The islands of Saint-Ignace-de-Loyola, Dupas and Castors (Beavers) are connected to the north side of St. Lawrence River by a small network of bridges. The connection between the two sides of St. Lawrence River) is provided by a ferry service between Sorel and Saint-Ignace Island (the largest island of the archipelago). Most of the other islands are accessible only by boat. The south side of the river, the "Île des Embarras" (Embarrassment Island) is the smallest of the inhabited islands.

== Geology ==
The Archipelago of Lake Saint Pierre is a delta from the last glaciation and modified by the alluvium of St. Lawrence River. Following the withdrawal of the ice cap, the Sorel Islands region was invaded by the Champlain Sea which is then withdrawn gradually, about 12000 years ago. Clayey marine sediments were deposited at the bottom of the water.

The visible part of the islands of the Archipelago is formed of recent alluvium. These deposits with a maximum height of 7 to 8 metres (23 to 26 feet) above the river level consist mainly of silt deposited by the Champlain Sea at the back that forced marine waters this time to integrate the current riverbed. Today, the same phenomenon is repeated annually during spring flooding while the waters of the river cover a portion of the Sorel Islands and will leave a layer alluvium. Although they can cause problems and damage to the island for a few weeks to travel, the spring floods are beneficial to agriculture.

== Topography ==
The St. Lawrence River widens the entrance of Lake Saint Pierre which forms a delta archipelago of hundreds of islands and islets. Several channels crisscross between these islands. This region is characterized by a very few marked relief. The slope is 3 to 5 metres (9.8 to 16.4 feet) above sea level Most of the islands are widely flooded every spring.

== Climate ==
This region plays a northern continental climate, slightly cooler than area Montreal but much more sunny. Frost-free period is long, which favors cereal crop production. In winter there is not too severe with rainfall and bit excessive cold.

== Hydrography ==
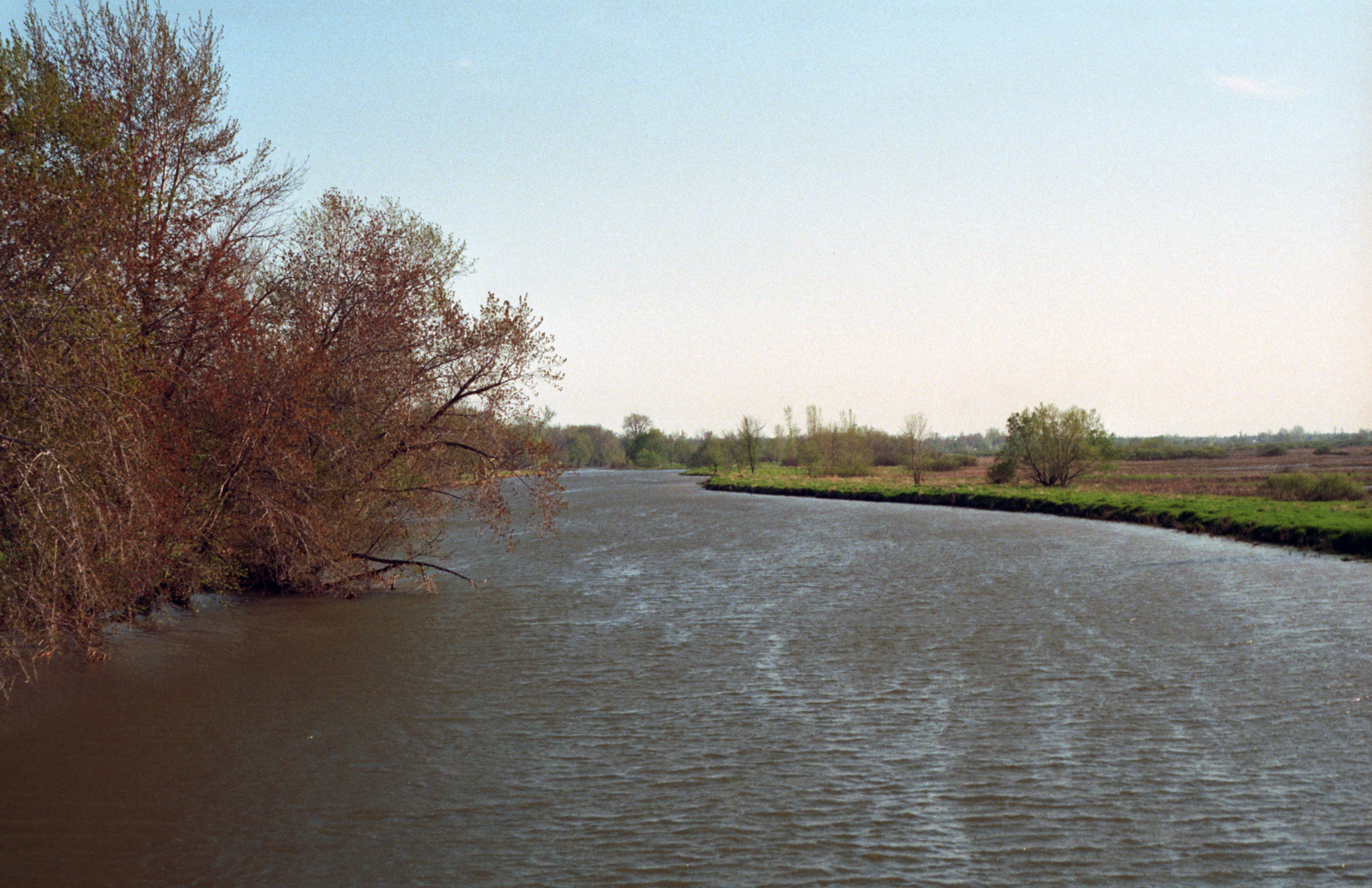
Chenal du Moine, South

The area of the Archipelago has 14 tributaries draining an area of 46,075 square kilometres (17,790 square miles), for a monthly average flow of 777 cubic metres (27,400 cubic feet) per second. The disproportion between the contribution of banks is impressive; the report is favourable to ten against one for the south shore to the Archipelago. The shore south of the Archipelago with only 4 rivers has a pool of 42,250 square kilometres (16,310 square miles) for a flow 712 cubic metres (25,100 cubic feet) per second while the bank on the north side of Archipelago with ten rivers covers only 3,825 square kilometres (1,477 square miles) and flows that 65.2 cubic metres (2,300 cubic feet) per second.

== Wildlife ==
Islands and Lake Saint Pierre is the most important migratory stopover in eastern Canada for waterfowl. The ecological value of these wetlands has been recognized by the UNESCO in 2000.

== Human history on islands ==
These are the first Native Americans who inhabited and frequented the Archipelago are deriving their livelihood from the fauna of the islands. Jacques Cartier mentions in his travel in September 1535. On 29 June 1603, it was the turn of Samuel de Champlain to observe Amerindian. Then in August 1642, is the foundation of a wooden fort. This in order to repel the attacks of Iroquois on Trois-Rivières. The fort was burned by the Iroquois in 1647. It was not until 1665 that a new fort was rebuilt by the company of Captain Pierre de Saurel from Carignan.

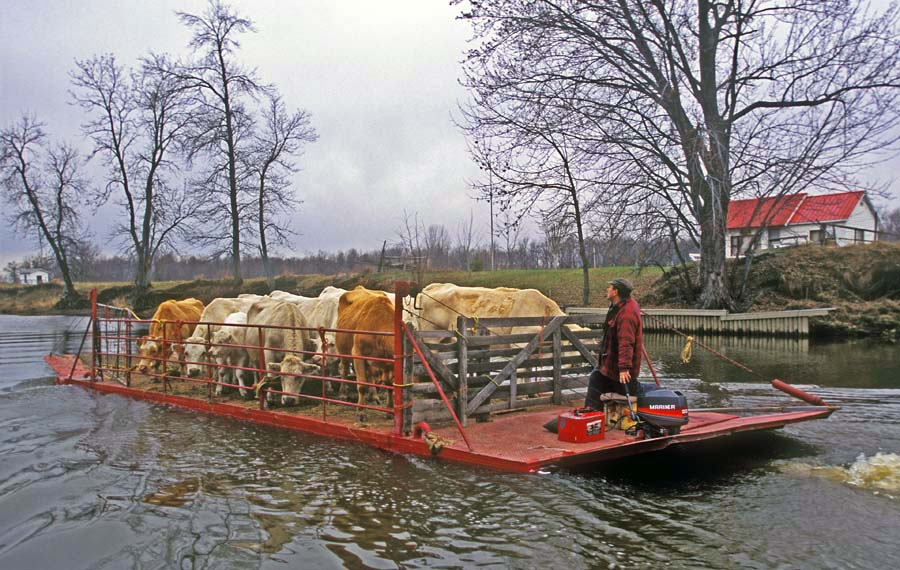
In La Visitation-de-l'Île-Dupas, Quebec in the summer, the islands are grazing in the open, no fences.

A few years later, in 1672, demobilized soldiers are the first settlers in the Archipelago. The exploitation of communal grazing on the islands finds its origin here. Agriculture fits this Archipelago of floodplains and in 1710 the population of the manor is 112 people. The population is concentrated in the Beaver Islands, Dupas, Saint-Ignace and Isle Madame at the north of the Archipelago.

In the late 1920s, several dams stones were built upstream channels to raise the water level in the shipping channel that runs south of the Archipelago.

Many summer cottages on pillories were erected along the "chenal aux corbeaux" (Ravens channel), between the Crows and Lapierre Islands. This is the corner of the country Le Survenant (roman) (French novel) described in the two novels written by Germaine Guèvremont The Outlander (written in 1945) and Marie-Didace (written in 1947). The characters in these two novels are associated with the Sorel Islands. Germaine Guèvremont lived for nearly 30 years on the Îlette Pé (near the "Chenal du moyne" - Channel of the monk) and her house became for some years the Museum of Scripture.

== Partial list of 103 islands ==
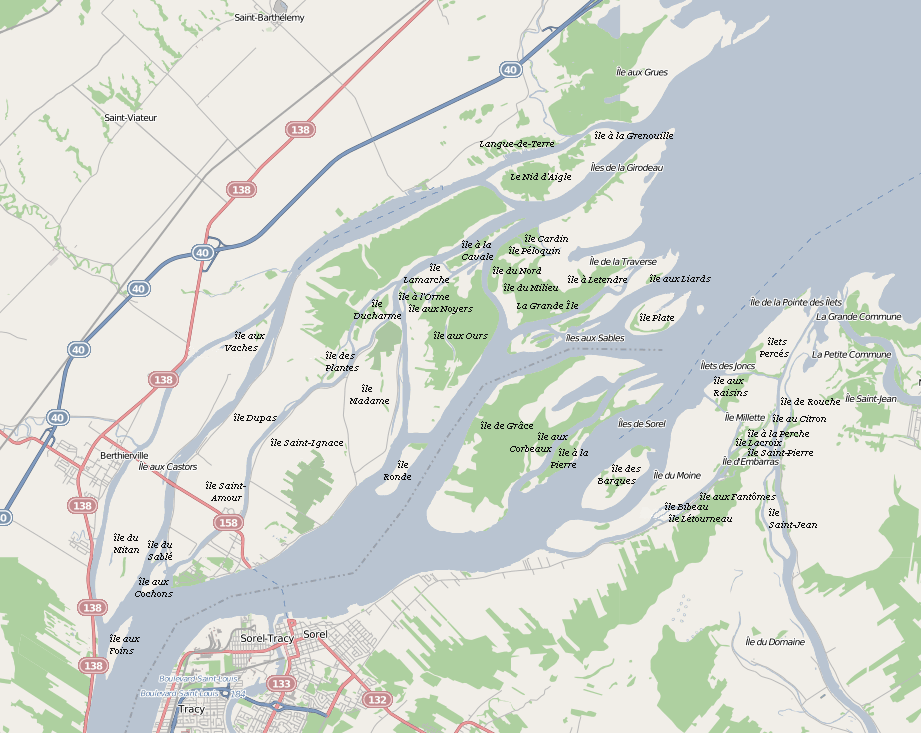

Here is a partial list of islands (50/103) (listed as French toponyms):.

1. île aux Foins
2. île du Mitan
3. île du Sablé
4. île aux Cochons
5. île aux Castors
6. île Dupas
7. île Saint-Amour
8. île Saint-Ignace
9. île Ronde
10. île Madame
11. île aux Ours
12. île de Grâce
13. île aux Corbeaux
14. île à la Pierre
15. île des Barques
16. île du Moine
17. île Bibeau
18. île Létourneau
19. îles aux Fantômes
20. île Lacroix
21. île d'Embarras
22. île Saint-Jean
23. île Saint-Pierre
24. île à la Perche
25. île au Citron
26. île Millette
27. île de Rouche
28. îles aux Raisins
29. Islets Percés
30. île aux Vaches
31. île du Curé
32. île des Plantes
33. île Ducharme
34. île à l'Orme
35. île aux Noyers
36. île Lamarche
37. île à la Cavale
38. île du Nord
39. île du Milieu
40. la Grande Île
41. îles aux Sables
42. île Plate
43. île à Letendre
44. île de la Traverse
45. île Péloquin
46. île Cardin
47. îles de la Girodeau
48. Le Nid d'Aigle
49. île à la Grenouille
50. îles aux Grues

== See also ==
=== See also ===
- Lake Saint Pierre
- Saint Lawrence Seaway
- Saint Lawrence River
- List of longest rivers of Canada
- List of Quebec rivers
- List of crossings of the Saint Lawrence River
- Biosphere reserve of Lac-Saint-Pierre
- Biophare Museum
- Champlain Sea
- Saint Lawrence Lowlands
