= Pierreville, Quebec =

Pierreville
- Municipality
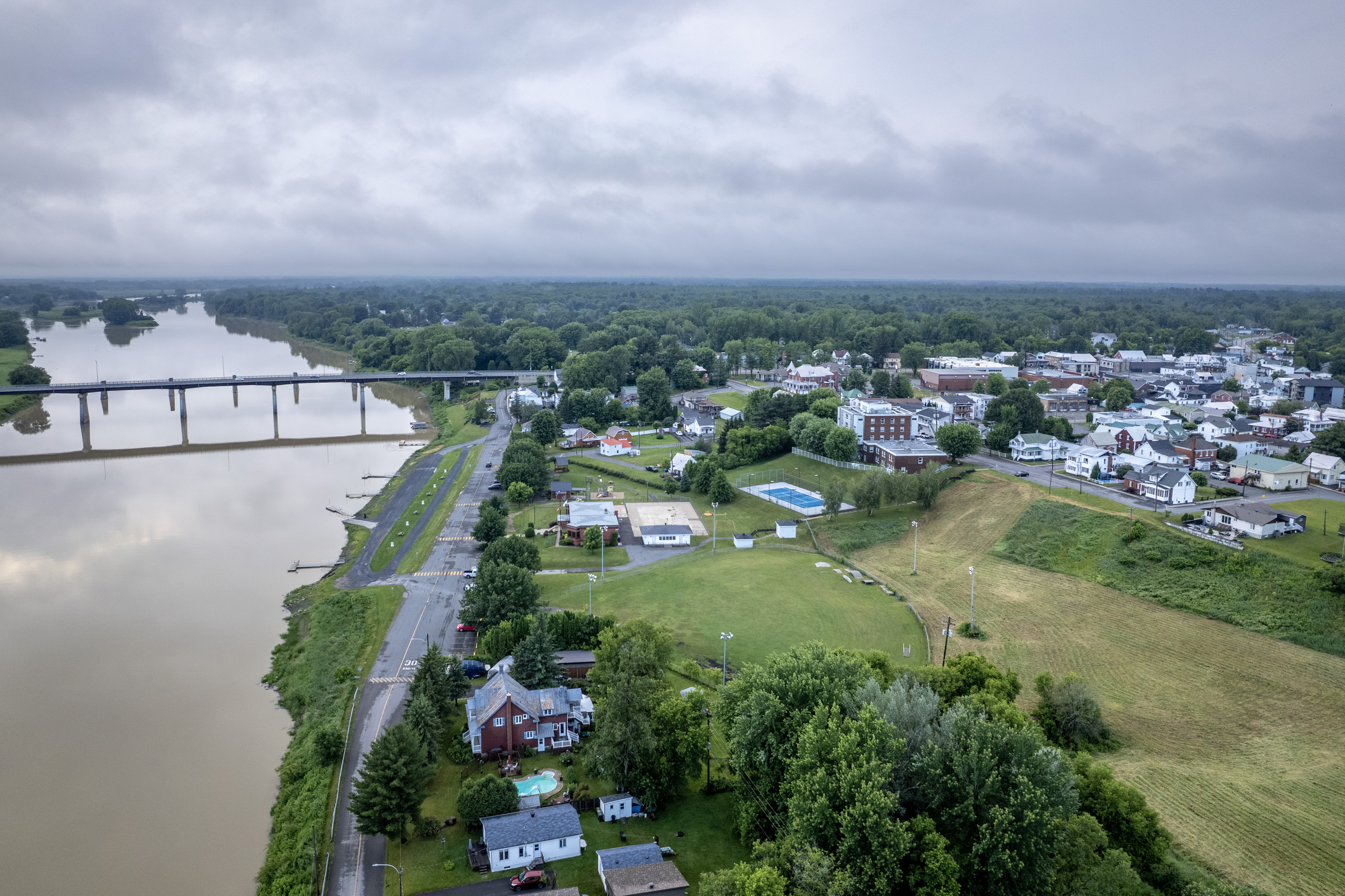
- Aerial view of Pierreville

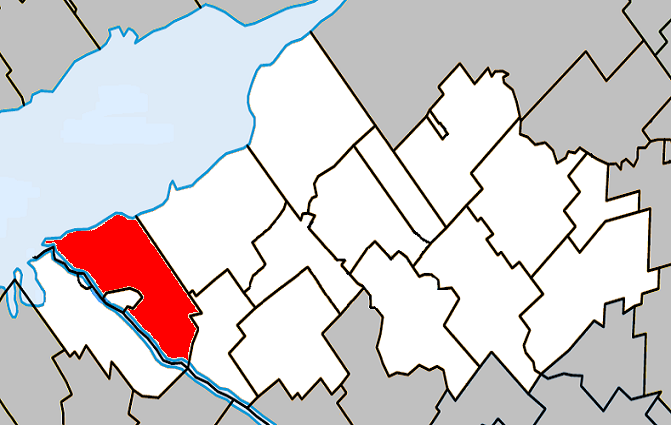
- Location within Nicolet-Yamaska RCM

- Location in southern Quebec
- Coordinates: 46°04′N 72°49′W
- Country: Canada
- Province: Quebec
- Region: Centre-du-Québec
- RCM: Nicolet-Yamaska
- Constituted: June 13, 2001

Government
  - Mayor: Michel Deraspe
  - Federal riding: Bécancour—Nicolet—Saurel—Alnôbak
  - Prov. riding: Nicolet-Bécancour

Area
  - Municipality: 124.90 km^{2} (48.22 sq mi)
  - Land: 77.71 km^{2} (30.00 sq mi)
  - Urban: 2.92 km^{2} (1.13 sq mi)

Population (2021)
  - Municipality: 2,104
  - Density: 27.1/km^{2} (70/sq mi)
  - Urban: 1,863
  - Urban density: 638.8/km^{2} (1,654/sq mi)
  - Pop 2016–2021: ▼1.8%
  - Dwellings: 1,196
- Time zone: UTC−5 (EST)
  - Summer (DST): UTC−4 (EDT)
- Postal code(s): J0G 1J0
- Area codes: 450 and 579
- Highways: R-132; R-226
- Website: www.pierreville.net

Pierreville (French pronunciation: [pjɛʁvil]) is a municipality in Nicolet-Yamaska Regional County Municipality, Quebec, located at the confluence of the Saint Lawrence and Saint-François rivers, at the edge of Lac Saint-Pierre. The population as of the Canada 2021 Census was 2,104.

Pierreville faces the town of Saint-François-du-Lac across the Saint-François river, and lies at the junction of Route 132 and Route 226. Part of the Abenaki Indian reserve of Odanak is an enclave within the city limits of Pierreville. The limits of the reserve begin only a short walk away from the town's main street.

== History ==
On 21 August 1991, an F3 tornado, the "tornade de Maskinongé", touched down in Notre-Dame-de-Pierreville (today part of Pierreville), destroying a number of summer homes in the area and injuring 15 people.

On June 13, 2001, the parish municipalities of Notre-Dame-de-Pierreville and Saint-Thomas-de-Pierreville merged with the village municipality of Pierreville to form the new municipality of Pierreville.

== Geography ==
=== Climate ===
Climate data for Pierreville
| Month | Jan | Feb | Mar | Apr | May | Jun | Jul | Aug | Sep | Oct | Nov | Dec | Year |
|---|---|---|---|---|---|---|---|---|---|---|---|---|---|
| Record high °C (°F) | 14.5 (58.1) | 11.5 (52.7) | 16.5 (61.7) | 31.5 (88.7) | 31 (88) | 34 (93) | 34 (93) | 33.5 (92.3) | 31.5 (88.7) | 25.5 (77.9) | 21 (70) | 14.5 (58.1) | 34 (93) |
| Mean daily maximum °C (°F) | −6.5 (20.3) | −4.1 (24.6) | 1.4 (34.5) | 10.3 (50.5) | 18.7 (65.7) | 23.6 (74.5) | 25.8 (78.4) | 24.6 (76.3) | 19.3 (66.7) | 12.3 (54.1) | 4.3 (39.7) | −2.9 (26.8) | 10.6 (51.1) |
| Daily mean °C (°F) | −11.6 (11.1) | −9.3 (15.3) | −3.5 (25.7) | 5.4 (41.7) | 12.9 (55.2) | 18 (64) | 20.3 (68.5) | 19.1 (66.4) | 14.2 (57.6) | 7.8 (46.0) | 0.8 (33.4) | −7.2 (19.0) | 5.6 (42.1) |
| Mean daily minimum °C (°F) | −16.6 (2.1) | −14.4 (6.1) | −8.3 (17.1) | 0.5 (32.9) | 7.2 (45.0) | 12.4 (54.3) | 14.7 (58.5) | 13.7 (56.7) | 9 (48) | 3.3 (37.9) | −2.8 (27.0) | −11.4 (11.5) | 0.6 (33.1) |
| Record low °C (°F) | −38 (−36) | −34 (−29) | −32 (−26) | −15 (5) | −3 (27) | 0 (32) | 4.5 (40.1) | 2 (36) | −3 (27) | −7 (19) | −20 (−4) | −37.5 (−35.5) | −38 (−36) |
| Average precipitation mm (inches) | 76.7 (3.02) | 57 (2.2) | 64.8 (2.55) | 73.5 (2.89) | 87.1 (3.43) | 91.1 (3.59) | 97.4 (3.83) | 94.7 (3.73) | 79.2 (3.12) | 81 (3.2) | 95.4 (3.76) | 69.5 (2.74) | 967.5 (38.09) |
Source: Environment Canada

== Demographics ==
=== Population ===
Population trend:

| Census | Population | Change (%) |
|---|---|---|
| 2021 | 2,104 | ▼1.8% |
| 2016 | 2,143 | ▼1.5% |
| 2011 | 2,176 | ▼6.9% |
| 2006 | 2,337 | N/A |

=== Language ===
Mother tongue language (2021)

| Language | Population | Pct (%) |
|---|---|---|
| French only | 2,070 | 98.3% |
| English only | 20 | 1.0% |
| Both English and French | 15 | 0.7% |
| Other languages | 5 | 0.2% |

== Economy ==
=== Manufacturing ===
Pierreville is a major centre for the manufacture of fire trucks. Local builder Pierre Thibault Canada Ltee. built fire apparatus in Pierreville from 1938 to 1990. In 1968, members of the Thibault family established a competing business, Pierreville Fire Trucks, across the river in Saint-François-du-Lac. It operated until 1985. Levasseur Fire Trucks also built fire apparatus in Saint-François-du-Lac from 1988 to 2014. Today, Carl Thibault Fire Trucks operates in the former Pierre Thibault facility in Pierreville.

During the visit of Pope John Paul II to Canada in 1984, Pierre Thibault modified a GMC Sierra truck for use as a Popemobile, a secure form of transport built to withstand a commando attack. It was subsequently used for the 1998 papal visit to Cuba and was displayed at the Canada Museum of Science and Technology in 2005. The second truck was sent back to the Vatican in 1984.

=== Agriculture ===
As in the rest of the Centre-du-Quebec region, agriculture plays an important role in Pierreville's economy. A number of dairy, vegetable, grain and other farms are based in the area.

== See also ==
- List of municipalities in Quebec
- 21st-century municipal history of Quebec
