= Saint-Ignace-de-Loyola =

- Municipality
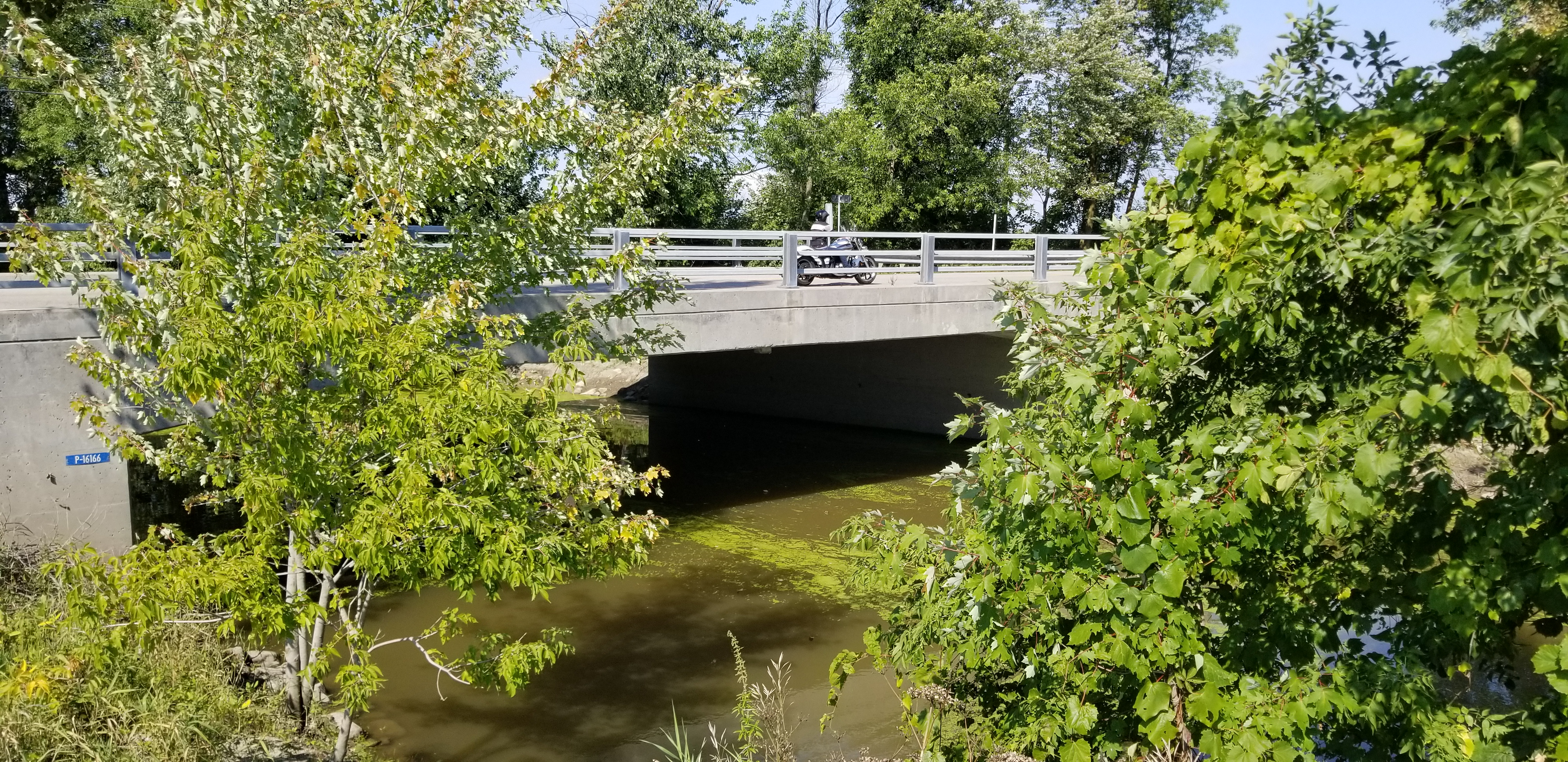

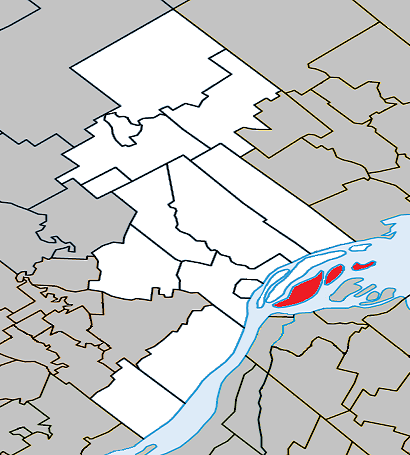
- Location within D'Autray RCM

- Location in central Quebec
- Coordinates: 46°04′N 73°08′W
- Country: Canada
- Province: Quebec
- Region: Lanaudière
- RCM: D'Autray
- Settled: 1669
- Constituted: February 11, 1897
- Named for: Ignatius of Loyola

Government
  - Mayor: Evelyne Latour
  - Fed. riding: Berthier—Maskinongé
  - Prov. riding: Berthier

Area
  - Total: 72.76 km^{2} (28.09 sq mi)
  - Land: 31.90 km^{2} (12.32 sq mi)

Population (2021)
  - Total: 2,048
  - Density: 64.2/km^{2} (166/sq mi)
  - Change 2016-21: ▼0.0%
  - Dwellings: 997
- Time zone: UTC−5 (EST)
  - Summer (DST): UTC−4 (EDT)
- Postal code(s): J0K 2P0
- Area codes: 450, 579
- Highways: R-158
- Website: www.stignacedeloyola.qc.ca

Saint-Ignace-de-Loyola (French pronunciation: [sɛ̃t‿iɲas də lwajɔla]) is a municipality in the Lanaudière region of Quebec, Canada, part of the D'Autray Regional County Municipality. Its territory is located on 33 of the Sorel Islands in the St. Lawrence River where it flows into Lac Saint-Pierre, the largest of which are île Madame, île aux Ours, and La Grande Île.

There is a ferry service connecting Quebec Route 158 in Saint-Ignace-de-Loyola to Sorel-Tracy across the St. Lawrence River.

== History ==
In 1895, the Parish of Saint-Ignace-de-Loyola was formed, and named in honour of the founder of the Jesuits, Ignatius López de Loyola (1491-1556). In 1896, its post office opened and a year later, the parish municipality was established by separating from La Visitation-de-l'Île-Dupas.

On October 31, 2012, it changed status from a parish municipality to a municipality.

== Demographics ==
Historical census populations – Saint-Ignace-de-Loyola

Year	Pop.	±%
1901	935	—
1911	1,054	+12.7%
1921	1,029	−2.4%
1931	1,115	+8.4%
1941	1,102	−1.2%
1951	1,401	+27.1%
1956	1,541	+10.0%

Year	Pop.	±%
1961	1,575	+2.2%
1966	1,683	+6.9%
1971	1,712	+1.7%
1976	1,629	−4.8%
1981	1,752	+7.6%
1986	1,795	+2.5%
1991	1,827	+1.8%

Year	Pop.	±%
1996	1,883	+3.1%
2001	1,880	−0.2%
2006	1,925	+2.4%
2011	2,086	+8.4%
2016	2,049	−1.8%
2021	2,048	−0.0%

Source: Statistics Canada

Private dwellings occupied by usual residents (2021): 941 (total dwellings: 997)

Mother tongue (2021):

- English as first language: 0.5%
- French as first language: 98.0%
- English and French as first languages: 0.2%
- Other as first language: 1.0%

== Government ==
List of former mayors:

- Didace Guévremont (1897–1898)
- Narcisse Cardin (1898–1899)
- Paul Plante (1899–1902)
- Honoré Plante (1902–1903)
- Hubert Paul-Hus (1903–1904, 1916–1919)
- Denis Cournoyer (1904–1907)
- André Plante (1907–1908)
- Albéric Désy (1908–1909)
- Joseph Guertin (1909–1911)
- Joseph Edmond Farly (1911–1914, 1921–1923)
- Pierre-Côme Guévremont (1914–1916, 1923–1925)
- Alphonse Richard (1919–1921)
- Pierre Bergeron (1925–1927)
- Anselme Chevalier (1927–1929)
- Eustache Plante (1929–1931, 1947–1949)
- Pierre Philias Saint-Martin (1931–1933, 1951–1953)
- Louis Guévremont (1933–1937)
- Roméo Massé (1937–1939)
- Louis Valois (1939–1947)
- Joseph Rémi Farly (1949–1951)
- Henri Gladu (1953)
- Alfred Fafard (1953–1956)
- Henri Louis Barthe (1956–1959)
- Louis Armand Barthe (1959–1971)
- Lucien René Plante (1971–1976)
- Jean Guertin (1976–1983)
- Serge Giroux (1983–2009)
- Jean-Luc Barthe (2009–2025)
- Evelyne Latour (2025–present)

== Education ==
Commission scolaire des Samares operates francophone public schools, including:

- École de l'Île Saint-Ignace - temporarily closed in 2016

The Sir Wilfrid Laurier School Board operates anglophone public schools, including:

- Joliette Elementary School in Saint-Charles-Borromée
- Joliette High School in Joliette

== See also ==
- List of municipalities in Quebec
