= Quebec Route 226 =

Highway in Quebec, Canada

Route 226

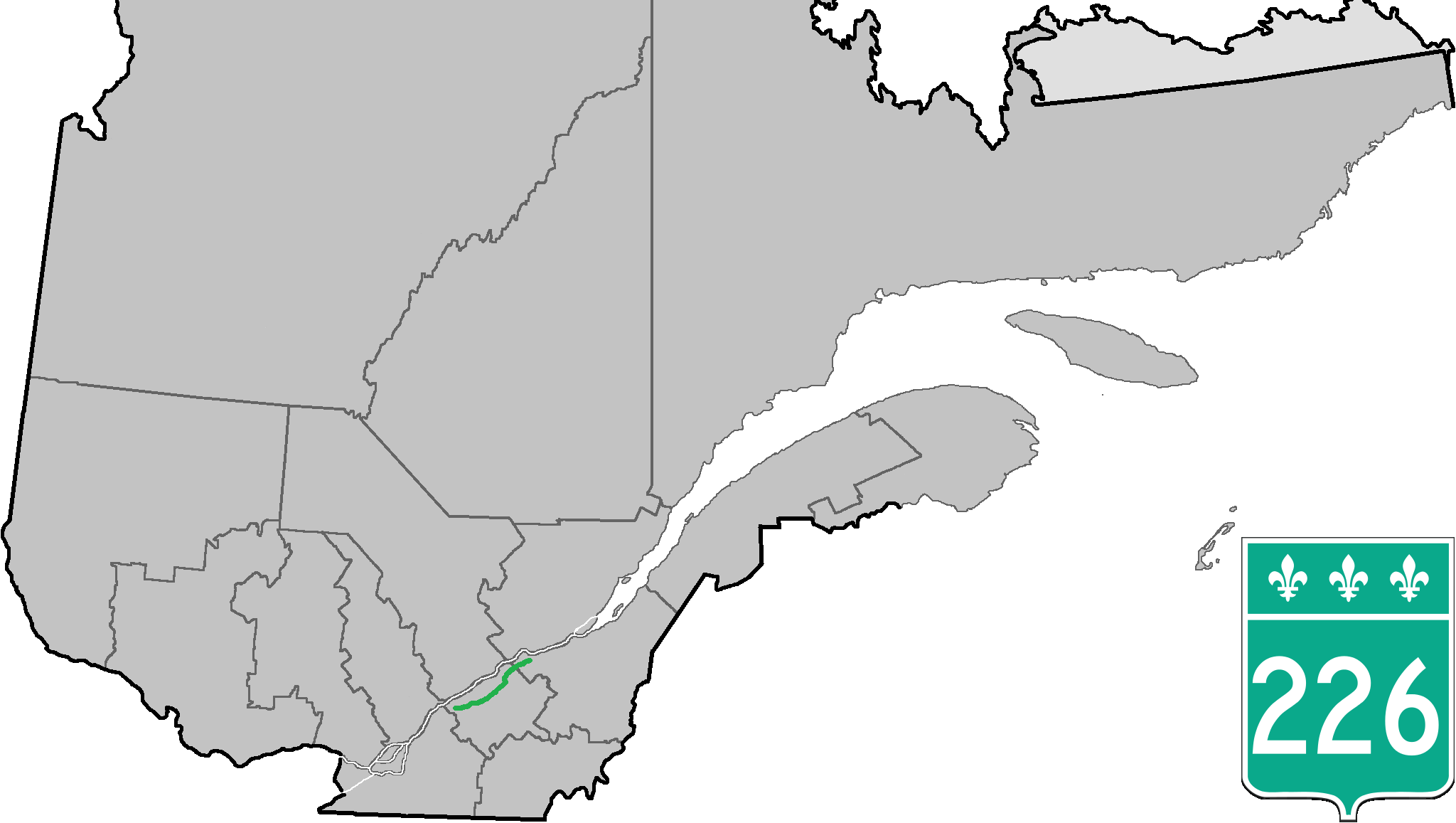

Route information
- Maintained by Transports Québec
- Length: 129.2 km (80.3 mi)

Major junctions
- West end: R-132 in Pierreville
- R-255 in Saint-Elphège; R-259 in Sainte-Monique; A-55 / R-155 in Saint-Célestin; R-261 in Bécancour; R-263 in Sainte-Marie-de-Blandford; R-218 in Sainte-Sophie-de-Lévrard; R-265 in Fortierville
- East end: R-271 in Sainte-Croix

Location
- Country: Canada
- Province: Quebec

Highway system
- Quebec provincial highways; Autoroutes; List; Former
← R-225	→ R-227

Route 226 is a two-lane east/west highway in Quebec, Canada. Its western terminus is at the junction of Route 132 in Pierreville and its eastern terminus is in Sainte-Croix at the junction of Route 271.

Route 226 is an exclusively rural highway going through very small villages in the Chaudière-Appalaches and mostly in the Centre-du-Québec regions. The biggest village along the way is Saint-Édouard-de-Lotbinière, with 1,200 people.

== Municipalities along Route 226 ==
- Pierreville
- Saint-Elphège
- La-Visitation-de-Yamaska
- Sainte-Monique
- Grand-Saint-Esprit
- Saint-Célestin (municipality)
- Saint-Célestin (village)
- Bécancour
- Sainte-Marie-de-Blandford
- Sainte-Sophie-de-Lévrard
- Fortierville
- Parisville
- Leclercville
- Saint-Édouard-de-Lotbinière
- Sainte-Croix
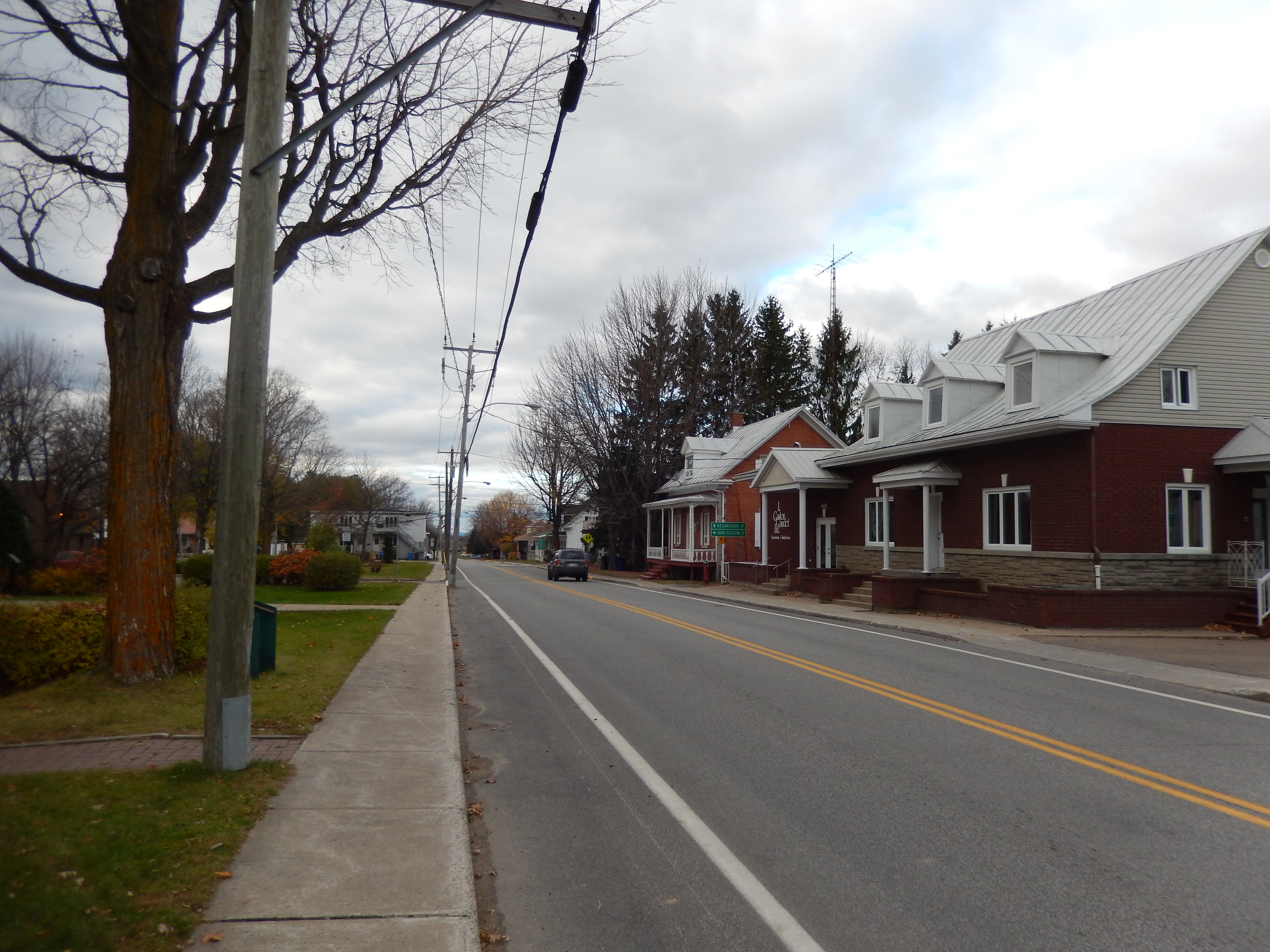
Route 226 in Sainte-Gertrude.

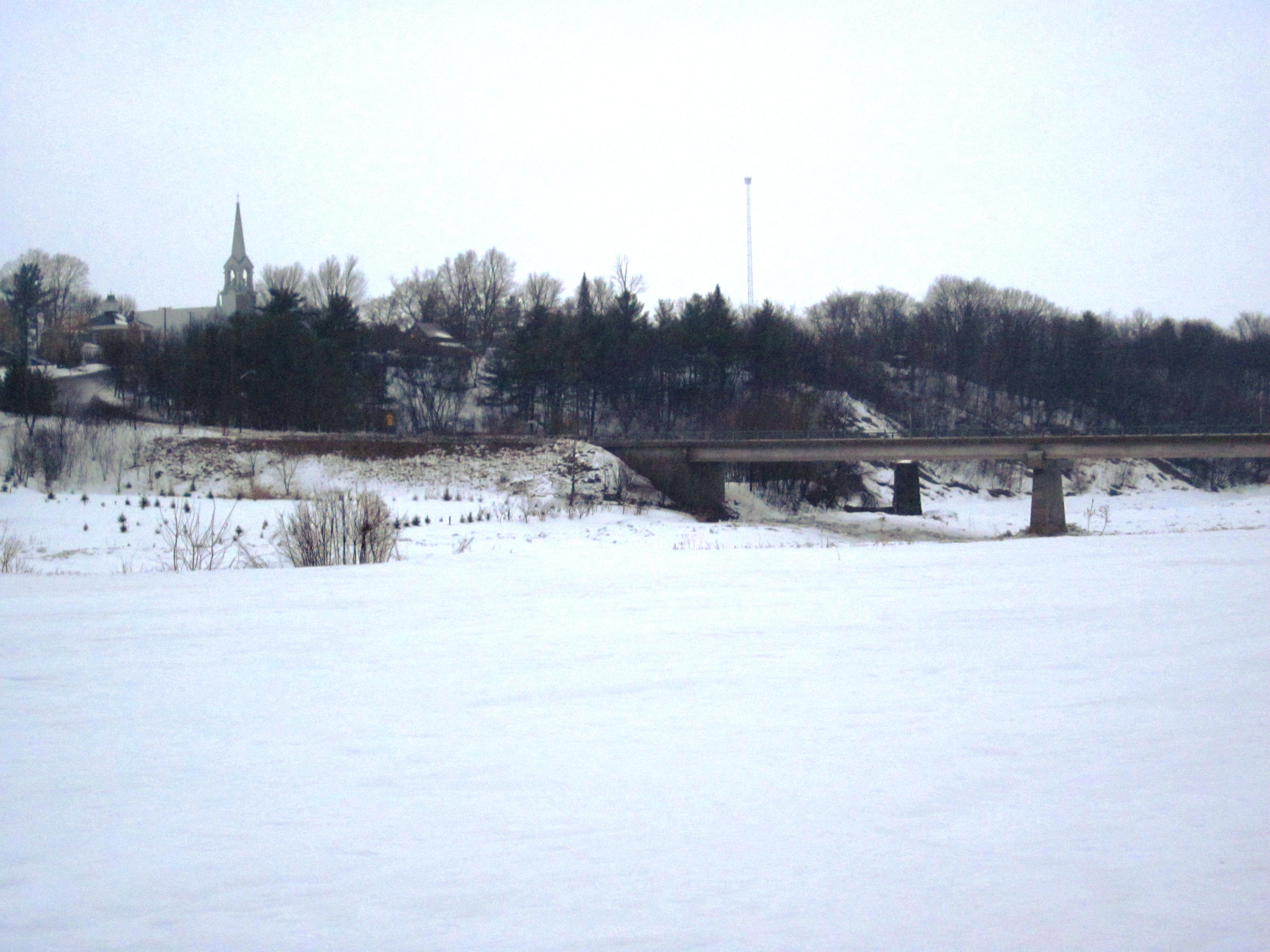
Bridge over Nicolet River in Sainte-Monique.

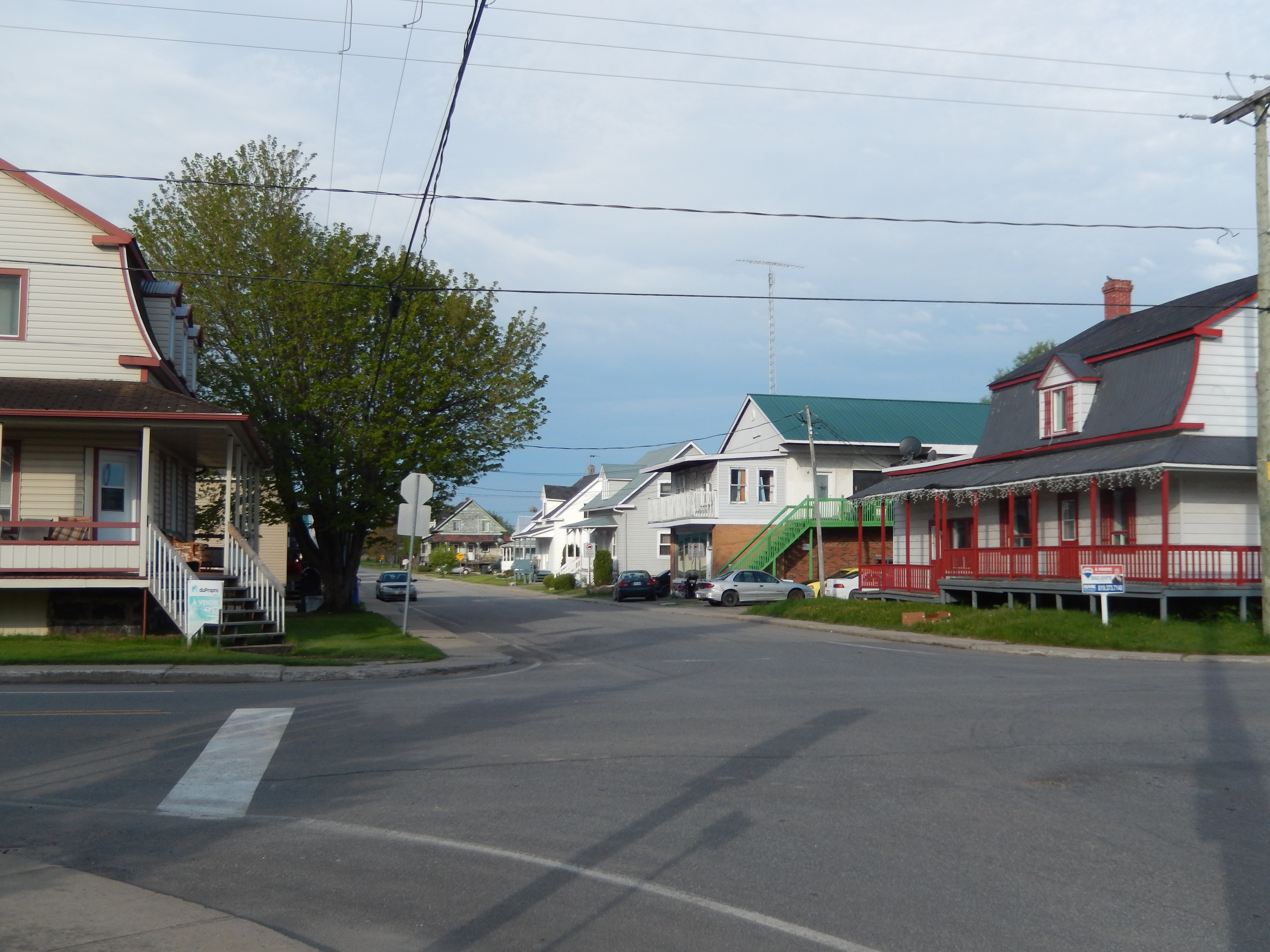
Route 226 through Sainte-Marie-de-Blandford.

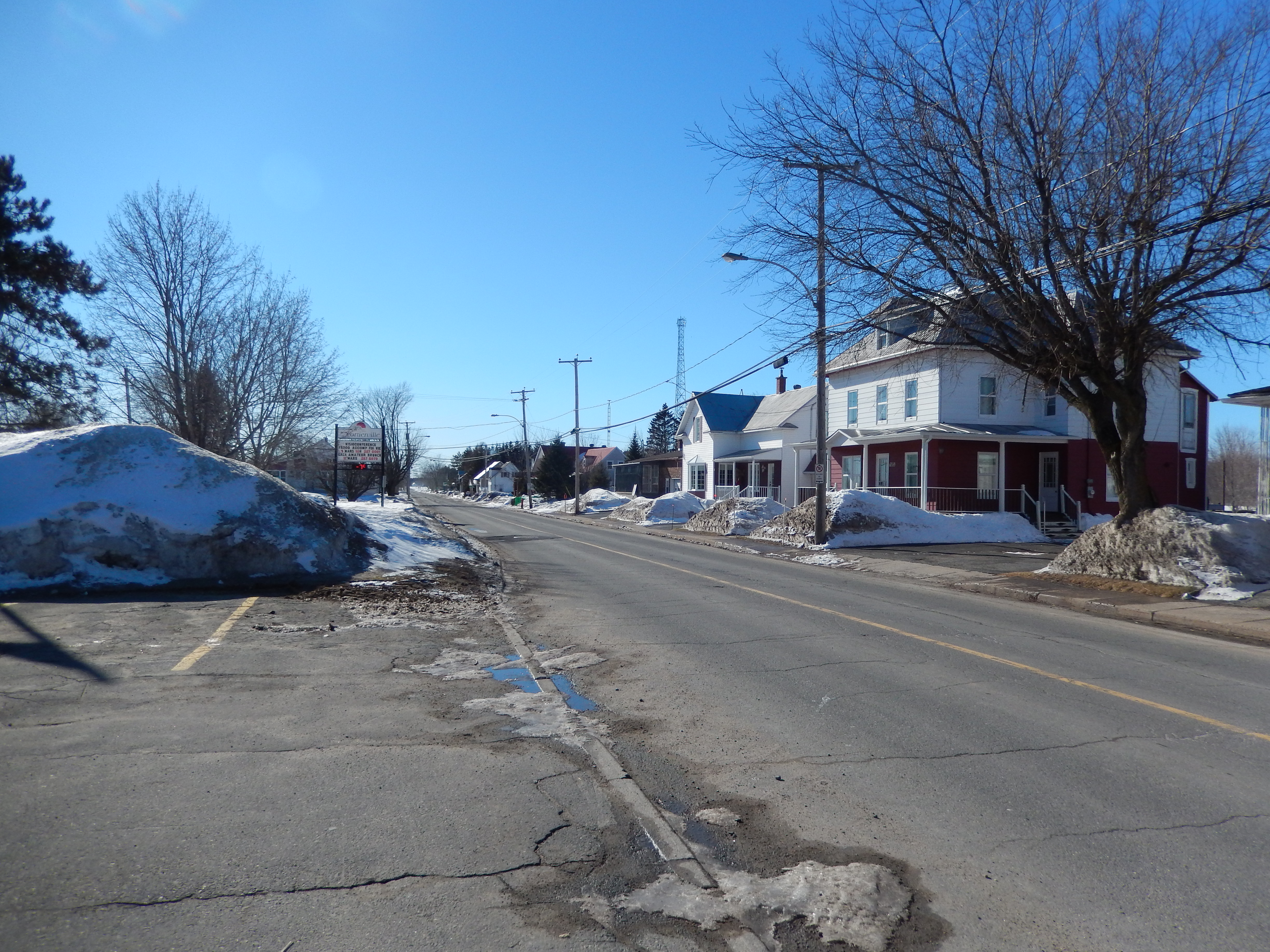
Route 226 follows Principale street in Fortierville.

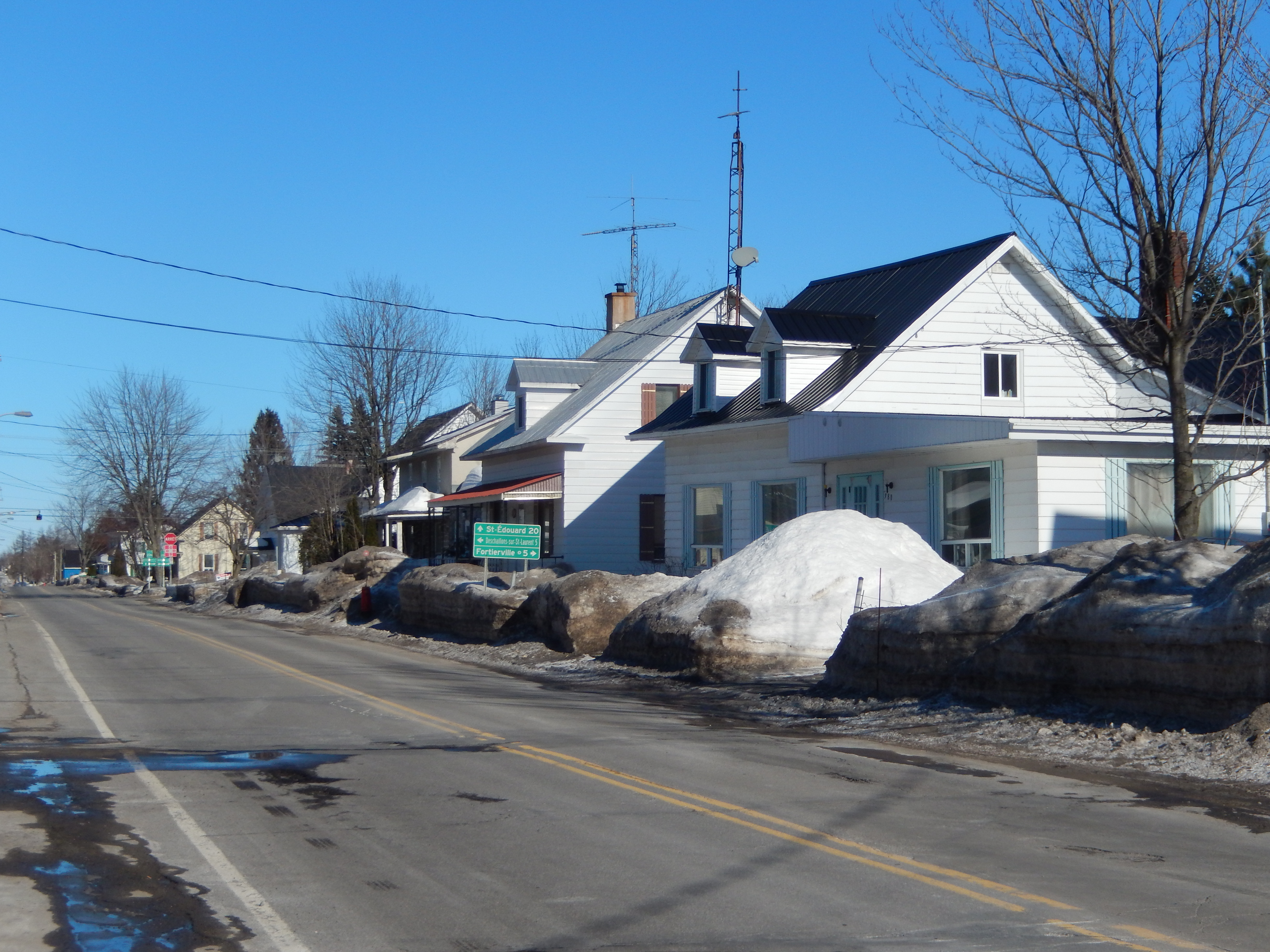
Intersection with Route 265 in Parisville.

== See also ==
- List of Quebec provincial highways
