= Baie-du-Febvre =

- Municipality
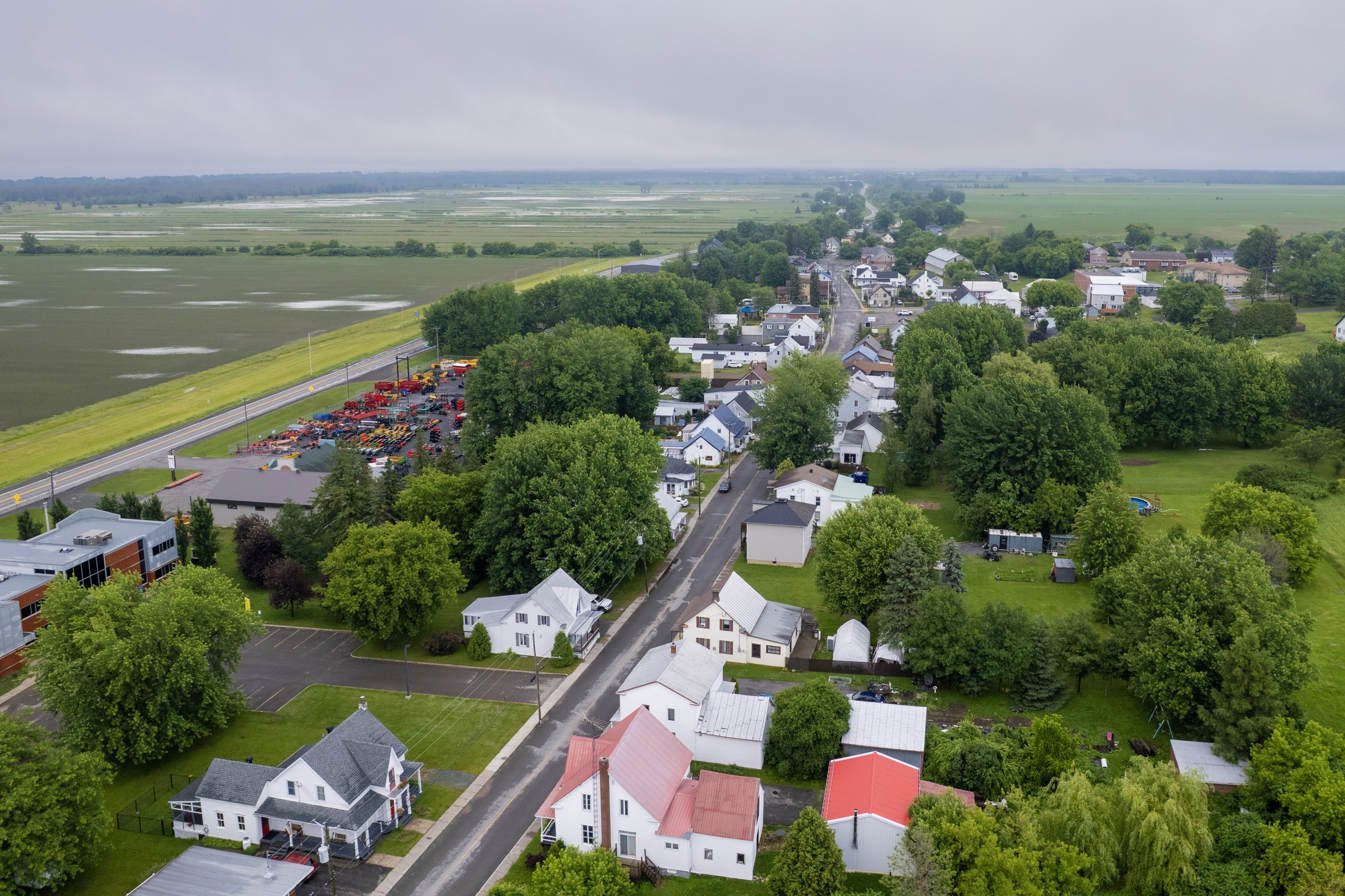
- Aerial view of Baie-du-Febvre

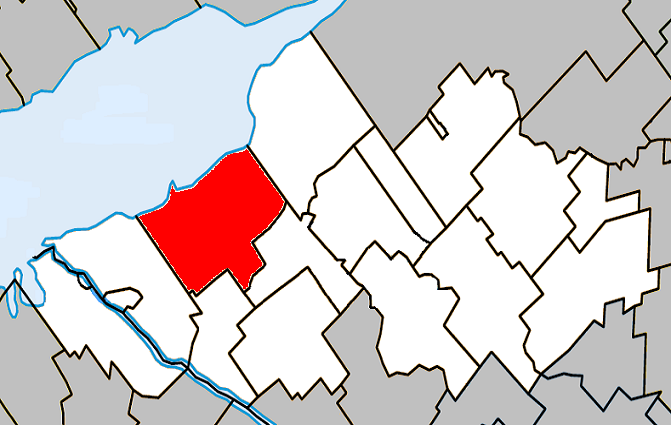
- Location within Nicolet-Yamaska RCM

- Location in southern Quebec
- Coordinates: 46°08′N 72°43′W
- Country: Canada
- Province: Quebec
- Region: Centre-du-Québec
- RCM: Nicolet-Yamaska
- Constituted: March 26, 1983

Government
  - Mayor: Joeffrey Desmanches
  - Federal riding: Bécancour—Nicolet—Saurel—Alnôbak
  - Prov. riding: Nicolet-Bécancour

Area
  - Total: 173.20 km^{2} (66.87 sq mi)
  - Land: 96.78 km^{2} (37.37 sq mi)

Population (2021)
  - Total: 961
  - Density: 9.9/km^{2} (26/sq mi)
  - Pop 2016-2021: ▼2.7%
  - Dwellings: 517
- Time zone: UTC−5 (EST)
  - Summer (DST): UTC−4 (EDT)
- Postal code(s): J0G 1A0
- Area codes: 450 and 579
- Highways: R-132; R-226; R-259
- Website: www.baie-du-febvre.net

Baie-du-Febvre (French pronunciation: [bɛ dy fɛvʁ]) is a municipality in the Nicolet-Yamaska Regional County Municipality of Quebec, Canada. The population as of the Canada 2021 Census was 961. The municipality lies on the south shore of Lac Saint-Pierre, a section of the Saint Lawrence River.

== Demographics ==
=== Population ===
Population trend:

Census	Population	Change (%)
2021	961	▼2.7%
2016	988	▼2.2%
2011	1,010	▼5.0%
2006	1,063	▼6.3%
2001	1,135	▼5.1%
1996	1,196	▼3.8%
1991	1,243	▼8.5%
1986	1,359	N/A

=== Language ===
Mother tongue language (2021)

Language	Population	Pct (%)
French only	935	97.4%
English only	0	0.00%
Both English and French	5	0.5%
Other languages	15	1.6%

== Economy ==
Baie-du-Febvre has its own independent telephone company, the Corporation de Téléphone de la Baie.

== Attractions ==
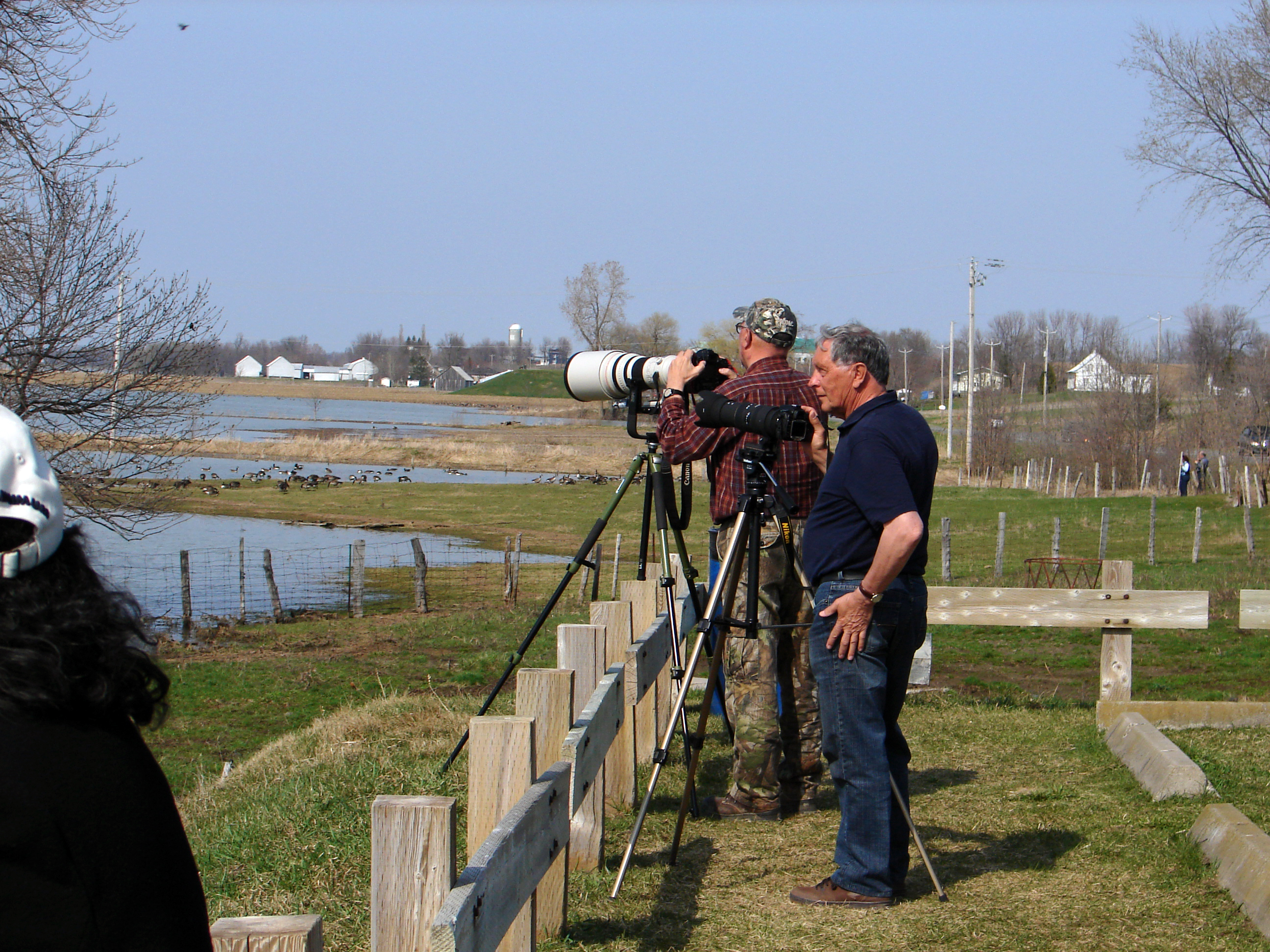
Bird watching in Baie-du-Febvre

Baie-du-Febvre, located on the southern shore of Lac Saint-Pierre (a UNESCO biosphere reserve), is well known as a haven for migrating snow geese. Many birdwatching enthusiasts congregate there in spring and fall to observe them. The town takes great pride in this aspect of its natural heritage, and has established an interpretation centre to teach visitors about the geese, their migration and the local biosphere. Apart from a protected area close to the river, Limited hunting of snow geese is permitted.

== See also ==
- List of municipalities in Quebec
- Lorenzo de Nevers
