= Lake Saint Pierre =

Lake in Quebec, Canada

- Lac Saint-Pierre; Nebesek
- Nebesek (Western Abnaki)
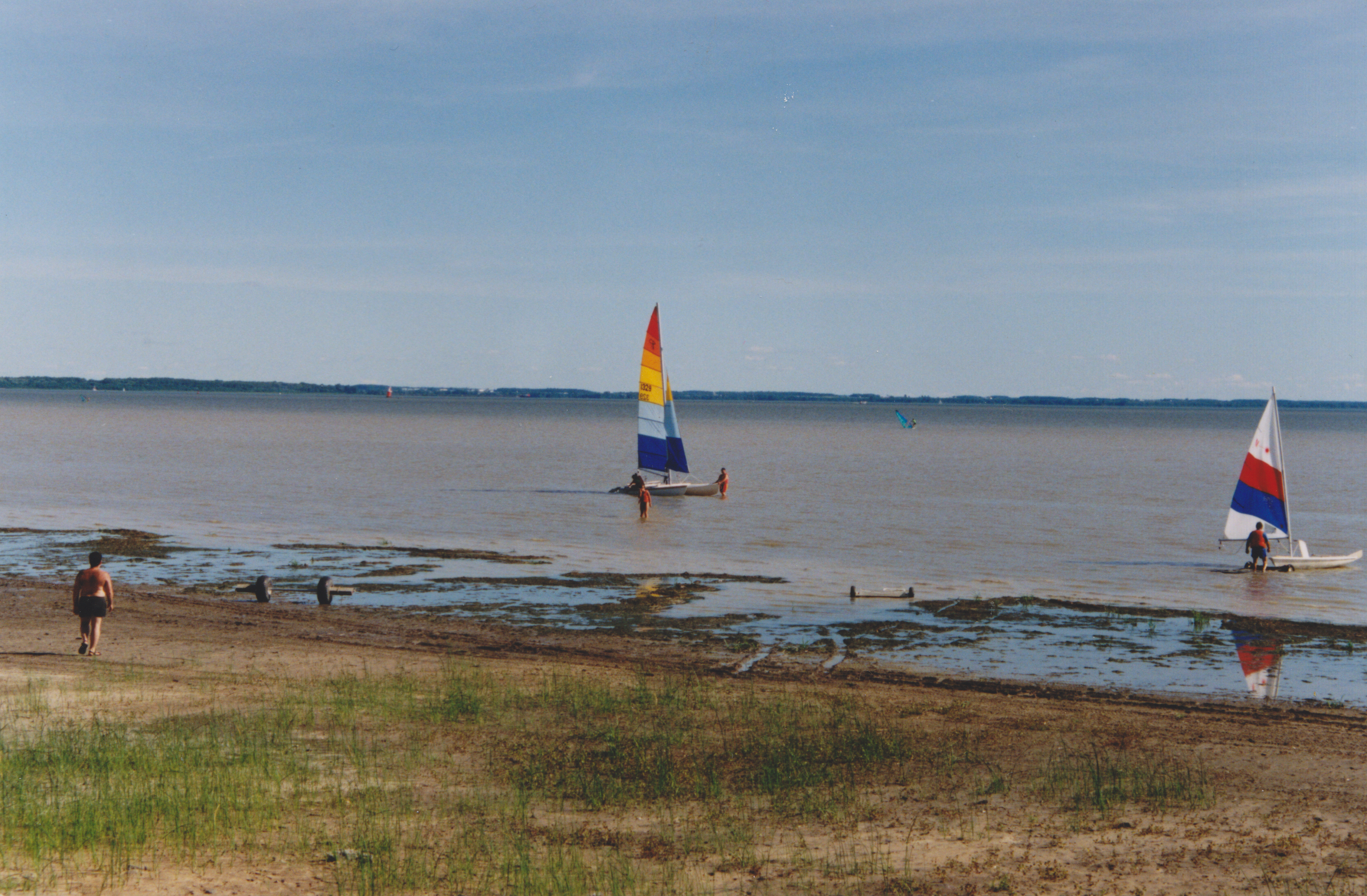
- Trois-Rivieres (City), Pointe-du-Lac (Sector)

- Location within Quebec
- Location: Canada, Quebec
- Coordinates: 46°12′15″N 72°49′56″W
- Type: Natural
- Primary inflows: Saint Lawrence River, Yamaska River, Saint-François River, Nicolet River, Maskinongé River, Rivière du Loup and Yamachiche River
- Primary outflows: Saint Lawrence River
- Basin countries: Canada
- Max. length: 32 km (20 mi)
- Max. width: 14 km (9 mi)
- Surface area: 353 km^{2} (136 sq mi)
- Average depth: 3 m (9.8 ft)
- Max. depth: 11.3 m (37 ft)
- Surface elevation: 3.3 m (11 ft)
- Islands: Sorel Islands
- Settlements: Trois-Rivières, Berthierville

Ramsar Wetland
- Official name: Lac Saint Pierre
- Designated: 25 May 1998
- Reference no.: 949

Lake Saint Pierre (French: Lac Saint-Pierre, pronounced [lak sɛ̃ pjɛʁ]; Western Abnaki: Nebesek) is a lake in Quebec, Canada, a widening of the Saint Lawrence River between Sorel-Tracy and Trois-Rivières. It is located downstream, and northeast, of Montreal; and upstream, and southwest, of Quebec City. The end of the lake delimits the beginning of the estuary of Saint Lawrence.

This lake which is 32 kilometres (20 mi) long (excluding Sorel Islands) and 14 kilometres (8.7 mi) wide, is part of the St. Lawrence Seaway. Including its shoreline, islands, and wetlands, the lake is a nature reserve. The body of water is recognized as a Ramsar site and as a Biosphere Reserve, due to the presence of many marshes and wetlands that are frequented by waterfowl. Recreational activities on the river (such as fishing, boating, sailing, swimming, water skiing, nature observation) are active mainly in summer season. Sport fishing is particularly popular, including ice fishing, especially in the great bay of Pointe-du-Lac.

Around Lake Saint-Pierre, several recreational services are available including marinas, hotel services, restaurants, outfitters, docks, gas stations, and cruises.

== Geography ==
Approximately 12,500 years ago, the retreat of the glaciers at the end of the last ice age resulted in a vast basin filled by the Champlain Sea. This sea extended from the city of Quebec to the east, and covered the Lower Mauricie, the Lower Laurentians, the lower part of the Ottawa Valley, Lake Ontario on the western side, and Lake Champlain USA) on the South side. The outline of the Champlain Sea is marked by ancient sandy shores where sand pits have been exploited. The water level has dropped some 8,000 years ago. The surface area of the watershed is 990,000 km^{2} (380,000 sq mi) (equivalent to more than 60% of the surface area of Quebec). 58% of the catchment area is located in the United States, 28% in Ontario and only 14% in Quebec (2.5% in direct tributaries, 0.07% in the littoral zone). Lake Saint-Pierre is linked to 11 administrative regions, 58 RCMs and 654 municipalities.

The lake is located in the Regional County Municipalities of Nicolet-Yamaska, Maskinongé, D'Autray, and Pierre-De Saurel, in addition to the city of Trois-Rivières. The shores of the lake affect several municipalities:

- North shore: Berthierville, Maskinongé, Louiseville, Yamachiche and Trois-Rivières (Pointe-du-Lac sector)
- South shore: Saint-Joseph-de-Sorel, Pierreville, Baie-du-Febvre and Nicolet.

Lake Saint-Pierre is fed by the St. Lawrence River (coming from the southwest) and the 14 main tributaries:

- North bank (from the mouth): Maskinongé River, Rivière du Loup, Yamachiche River, Glaises Stream, Sable River
- South bank (from the mouth): Yamaska River, Saint-François River, Colbert River, Landroche River, Des Frères River, Brielle River, Lemire River, Camille-Roy River, Nicolet River

The average depth of the lake is only three meters. The channel of the seaway that has been dredged has a maximum depth of 11.3 m.

== Toponymy ==
The lake was named by Samuel de Champlain following its passage on 29 June 1603, the day of the Saint-Pierre. The Abenaki call Lake Nebesek, which means at lac. Jacques Cartier, during his second voyage to Canada in 1535, had given it the name of "Angoulême".

== Natural environment ==
This seasonally-flooded area is an important stopping point for hundreds of thousands of migrating waterfowl. It is also an important nesting area for herons: more have been counted here than in any other place in North America. In 1998, it was recognized as a wetland of international significance under the Ramsar Convention.

The wildlife experts have identified 23 species of mammals around Lake Saint-Pierre, one of the most abundant species is the muskrat (Ondatra zibethicus), which is found in abundance in the lake.

=== Biosphere Reserve ===
Lake Saint-Pierre was appointed Biosphere Reserve by UNESCO in 2000. The biosphere reserve of Lac-Saint-Pierre has an area of 480 square kilometres (190 sq mi), whose 31 square kilometres (12 sq mi) in core areas and 124 square kilometres (48 sq mi) in buffer zones. The core areas are composed of Wildlife Refuge Great Island and bird refuge Nicolet.

Nearly 290 species of birds, about 90 species of fish and 27 rare plants have been listed in this biosphere reserve.

=== Wildlife Sanctuary of Great Island ===
Wildlife Sanctuary of "Grande-Île" (Great Island) is located on Grande-île in the Archipelago of Saint-Pierre Lake. It has an area of 1.45 square metres (15.6 sq ft). This wildlife refuge was created in 1992 is the protection of one of the largest heron colonies in North America. It houses more than 5,000 herons.

=== Nicolet Bird Sanctuary ===
The "birds Nicolet refuge" is a protected area of 30 square kilometres (12 sq mi) which protects a staging area for ducks and Canada goose and also a nesting area for waterfowl. National Defence has acquired the site in the 1950. The site was recognized as a rest area in 1969 and as a refuge in 1982.

== History ==
Being the last freshwater basin of the St. Lawrence River and its geographical position, Lake Saint-Pierre has marked the history of French Canada in terms of the fishing industry, hunting, transportation including the St. Lawrence Seaway, pleasure boating, the settlement of surrounding lands, winter ice roads and ferries.

Samuel de Champlain wrote, in 1609: "On the south side, there are two rivers, one called the" Rivière du Pont (Nicolet) and the other of Gennes (Saint-François or Yamaska), which are very beautiful and in beautiful and good country. "

== Environment ==
Since the 1970s, the water quality of Lake Saint-Pierre has improved significantly, thanks to governmental requirements, such as:

- construction upstream of discharged water filtration centres, including those of municipalities/cities and those of industries;
- cleaning the banks and bed of the river, by municipalities/cities, organizations, businesses and riparian owners;
- revision of the composition of many manufactured products, thus reducing harmful emissions into the environment;
- implantation by riparian owners of regulated septic tanks;
- prohibition of discharge of waste water by boaters and commercial vessels;
- increased recycling of domestic and industrial waste, reducing the dumping of waste in nature;
- enhanced surveillance of water activities (e.g. Canadian Coast Guard, Environment Ministry, Municipalities/Cities).

The traffic on the river is a significant generator of shoreline erosion due to the waves produced, especially by large vessels using the St. Lawrence Seaway. The seaway has changed the course of the natural flow of the river. In places, the flow distribution in the lake due to some stagnation of water near the banks, creating a silting.

== Use as military firing range ==
From 1952 to 2000, a portion of Lake St. Pierre was used as a military firing range. This covered about 160 km², about 40% of the lake's surface area. There are estimated to be 300,000 shells currently at the lake bottom, approximately 8000 of which failed to detonate and are considered to be unexploded ordnance. These unexploded shells continue to present a danger to both lake users and the natural environment, especially given that some shells have moved downstream and found as far away as Île d'Orléans, some 150 km away. The affected portion of the lake is heavily used year-round for recreation but is just south of the section of the St. Lawrence used for shipping activities. During the navigable season yellow buoys are installed in order to visually identify the area.

The munitions tests were conducted by the Munitions and Experimental Test Centre, also known as the Proof and Experimental Test Establishment. It continues to be operated by the Department of Natural Defence (DND). The centre still conducts munitions tests close by but no longer in or above the lake.

Cleanup of the area is the responsibility of the DND. The banks have been regularly cleared of shells as they wash up from the lake floor. No shells have been found on the banks of the lake since 2006. In 2016, the DND began a cleanup operation of a priority zone of the lake. The goal is to remove a total of approximately 14,500 shells, including 2700 unexploded shells over nine years. The work is complicated by the heavy recreational use of the lake and its status as a environmentally protected area. Due to these and other factors, the removal efforts can only occur during the summer and fall.

There is currently no way of clearing the area of shells without negatively affecting the natural environment. All interventions will at minimum, damage the aquatic flora and fauna as well as disturbing the potentially already contaminated sediment of the lake floor. The shells are removed from the site for disposal however there are a number of shells that cannot be safely moved and must be detonated in place. This has even greater consequences as this will cause the inevitable death of surrounding plants and animals living on the lake floor.

== Disasters and tragedies ==
Throughout history, Lake St. Pierre has been the site of:

- Large disasters: flooding due to spring floods (usually from the beginning of April up to mid-May, sometimes until the end of May) often increased by tides, often sudden windstorms causing high waves, spring debacles, icebreaking on winter roads on the water ... These forces of nature have often resulted in damage to waterfront facilities, equipment (such as fishing equipment), buildings and boats. Sometimes debris drift (fishing huts, docks, craft ...);
- Major tragedies: sinking, drowning, hunting or fishing accidents, people in perdition or drifting on the ice ...

In the days when wood was being transported by the flow of rivers, lost wood logs floated on Lake Saint-Pierre, detached themselves from the wooden cords during the floods, or escaped from the booms on the rivers adjacent (or upstream). These floating balls occasionally caused breakage to the boats. Sometimes, chores were organized to recover them.

On the north shore, between Maskinongé and Pointe-du-Lac, Highway 40 is a jetty protecting the land from rising or storm surges, at high tide or during major floods. Some flooding is causing a significant increase in the area of Lake Saint-Pierre. The flood waters of April and May 2017 were particularly disastrous on the shores.

== In popular culture ==
- Lac Saint-Pierre is the setting of the poem, folk ballad, and animated short, "the Wreck of the Julie Plante", by William Henry Drummond.
- It is not the lake sought after by Duddy Kravitz in The Apprenticeship of Duddy Kravitz by Mordecai Richler. The lake in this book is clearly in walking distance of Lac des Sables.

== See also ==
- Saint Lawrence Lowlands
- Archipelago of Saint-Pierre Lake
