= Nicolet-Yamaska Regional County Municipality =

Nicolet-Yamaska
- Regional county municipality
- Coordinates: 46°04′N 72°50′W
- Country: Canada
- Province: Quebec
- Region: Centre-du-Québec
- Effective: January 1, 1982
- County seat: Nicolet

Government
  - Type: Prefecture
  - Prefect: Alain Drouin

Area
  - Total: 1,182.20 km^{2} (456.45 sq mi)
  - Land: 1,007.09 km^{2} (388.84 sq mi)

Population (2016)
  - Total: 23,159
  - Density: 23/km^{2} (60/sq mi)
  - Change 2011-2016: ▲1.6%
  - Dwellings: 11,045
- Time zone: UTC−5 (EST)
  - Summer (DST): UTC−4 (EDT)
- Area code: 819
- Website: www.mrcnicolet- yamaska.qc.ca

Nicolet-Yamaska (French pronunciation: [nikɔlɛ(t) jamaska]) is a regional county municipality in the Centre-du-Québec region of Quebec, Canada.

The county seat is Nicolet.

== Subdivisions ==
There are 16 subdivisions within the RCM:

Cities & Towns (1)

- Nicolet

Municipalities (11)

- Aston-Jonction
- Baie-du-Febvre
- Grand-Saint-Esprit
- La Visitation-de-Yamaska
- Pierreville
- Saint-Célestin
- Saint-François-du-Lac
- Saint-Léonard-d'Aston
- Saint-Wenceslas
- Sainte-Eulalie
- Sainte-Monique

Parishes (3)

- Saint-Elphège
- Sainte-Perpétue
- Saint-Zéphirin-de-Courval

Villages (1)

- Saint-Célestin

First Nations Reserve (1)

(not associated with RCM)

- Odanak

== Demographics ==
Mother tongue from 2016 Canadian Census

| Language | Population | Pct (%) |
|---|---|---|
| French only | 22,015 | 97.5% |
| English only | 210 | 0.9% |
| Both English and French | 70 | 0.3% |
| Other languages | 285 | 1.3% |

== Transportation ==
=== Access Routes ===
Highways and numbered routes that run through the municipality, including external routes that start or finish at the county border:

- Autoroutes
  - A-20 (TCH)
  - A-55
- Principal Highways
  - R-132
  - R-143
  - R-155
  - R-161
- Secondary Highways
  - R-226
  - R-255
  - R-259
- External Routes
  - None

== See also ==
- List of regional county municipalities and equivalent territories in Quebec
