= Saint-Elphège =

- Parish municipality
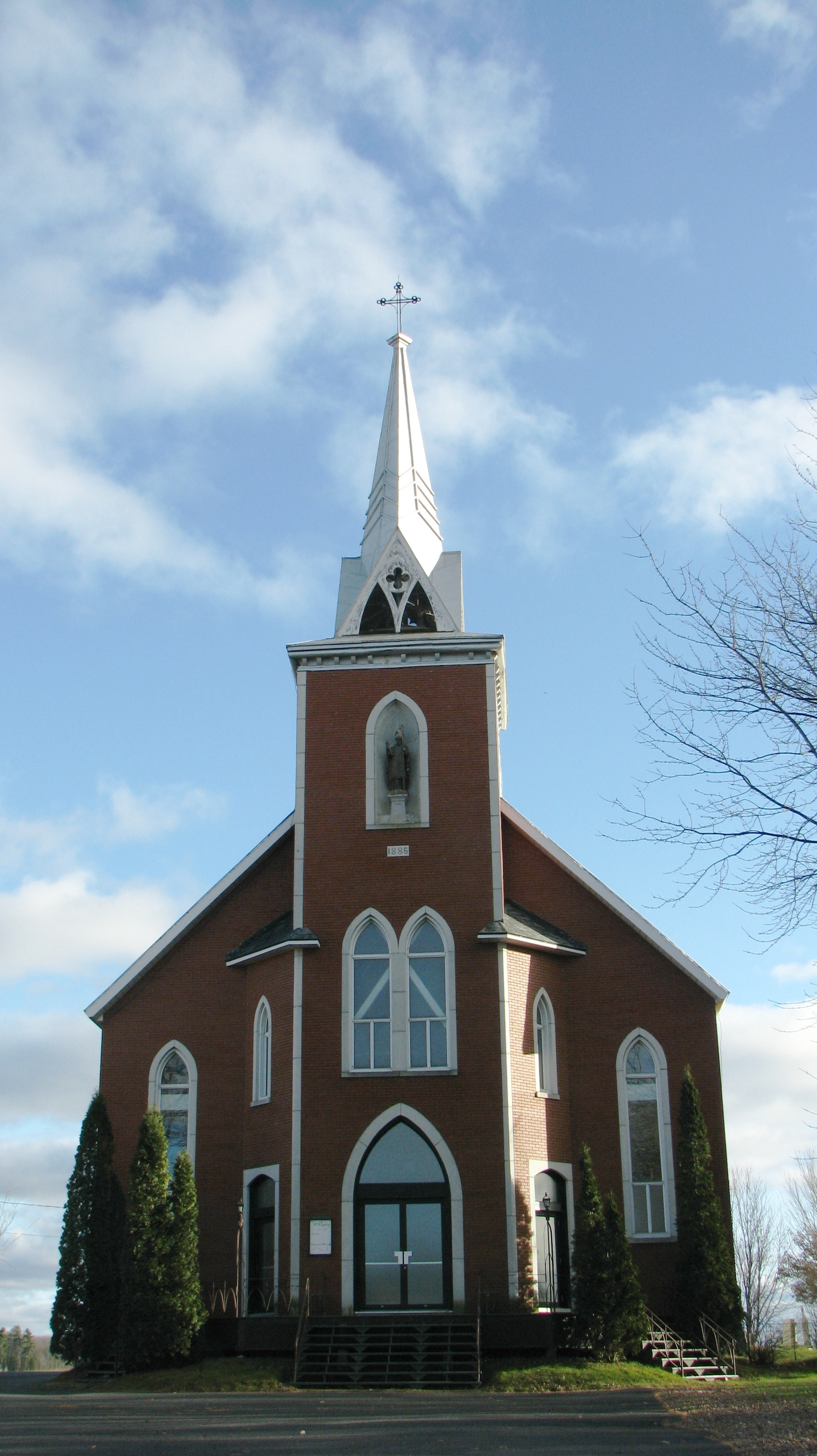

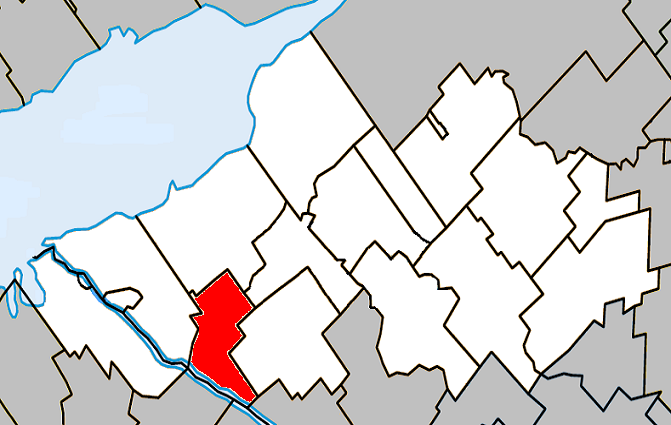
- Location within Nicolet-Yamaska RCM

- Location in southern Quebec
- Coordinates: 46°03′N 72°42′W
- Country: Canada
- Province: Quebec
- Region: Centre-du-Québec
- RCM: Nicolet-Yamaska
- Constituted: March 12, 1886

Government
  - Mayor: Mario Lefebvre
  - Federal riding: Bécancour—Nicolet—Saurel—Alnôbak
  - Prov. riding: Nicolet-Bécancour

Area
  - Total: 42.20 km^{2} (16.29 sq mi)
  - Land: 40.53 km^{2} (15.65 sq mi)

Population (2021)
  - Total: 251
  - Density: 6.2/km^{2} (16/sq mi)
  - Pop 2016-2021: ▼7.0%
  - Dwellings: 110
- Time zone: UTC−5 (EST)
  - Summer (DST): UTC−4 (EDT)
- Postal code(s): J0G 1J0
- Area codes: 450 and 579
- Highways: R-226
- Website: www.st-elphege.ca

Saint-Elphège (French pronunciation: [sɛ̃t‿ɛlfɛʒ]) is a parish municipality located on the east bank of the Saint-François River in the Nicolet-Yamaska Regional County Municipality of Quebec, Canada. The population as of the Canada 2021 Census was 251.

== Demographics ==
In the 2021 Census of Population conducted by Statistics Canada, Saint-Elphège had a population of 251 living in 102 of its 110 total private dwellings, a change of −7% from its 2016 population of 270. With a land area of 40.53 km^{2} (15.65 sq mi), it had a population density of 6.2/km^{2} (16.0/sq mi) in 2021.

Population trend:

Census	Population	Change (%)
2021	251	▲7.0%
2016	270	▼7.5%
2011	292	▲7.7%
2006	271	▼7.8%
2001	294	▼8.4%
1996	321	▲0.3%
1991	320	▼2.7%
1986	329	▲4.4%
1981	315	▼6.8%
1976	338	▼6.1%
1971	360	▼11.1%
1966	405	▼1.5%
1961	411	▼12.0%
1956	467	▲3.5%
1951	451	▼17.6%
1941	547	▼5.9%
1931	581	▼14.3%
1921	678	▲18.1%
1911	574	▼19.9%
1901	717	▲0.7%
1891	712	N/A

Mother tongue language (2021)

Language	Population	Pct (%)
French only	245	96.1%
English only	0	0.0%
Both English and French	0	0.0%
Other languages	5	2.0%

== See also ==
- List of parish municipalities in Quebec
