= Clifton A. Hall =

American architect

Clifton Alexander Hall
- Born: 1826; Boston, Massachusetts
- Died: 1913 (aged 86–87); Providence, Rhode Island
- Occupation: Architect

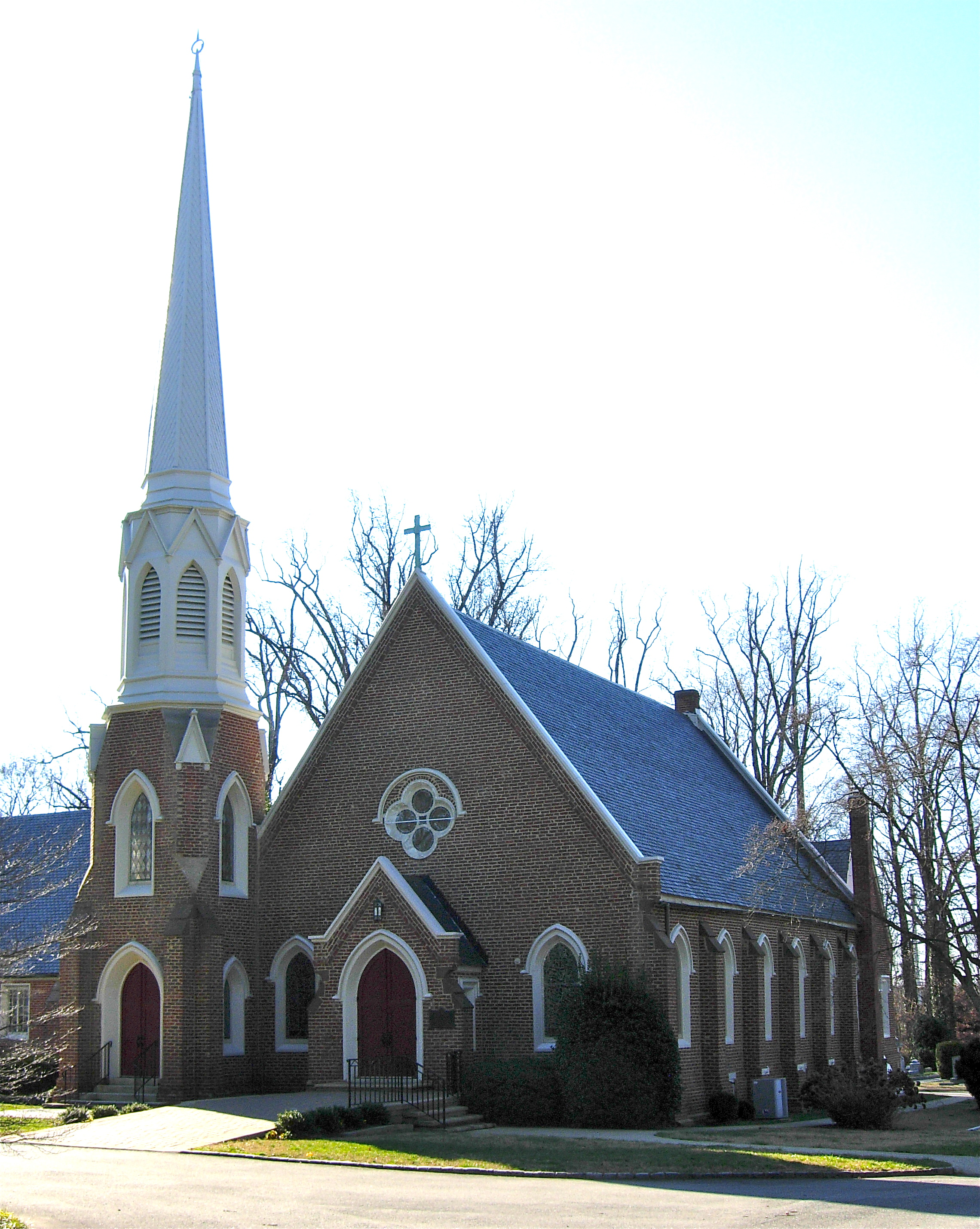
Emmanuel Church, Brook Hill, 1859.

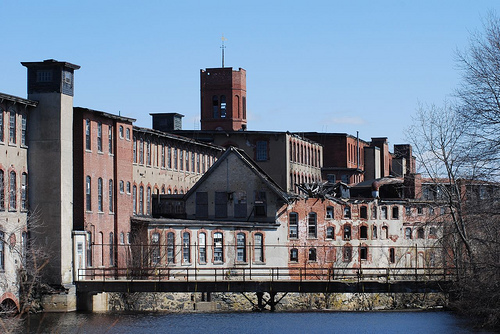
Pontiac Mills, Pontiac, 1863.

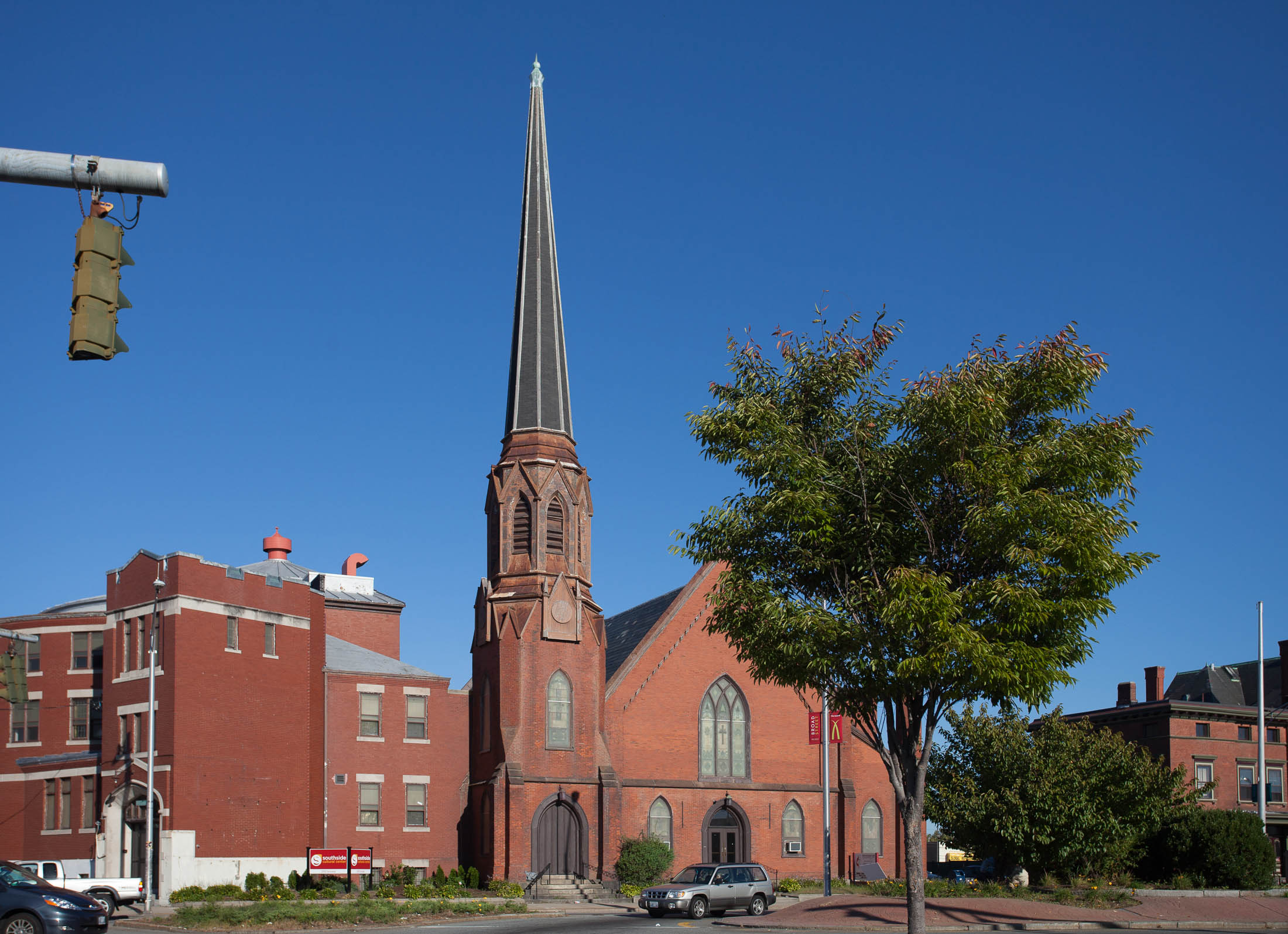
Trinity M. E. Church, Providence, 1864.

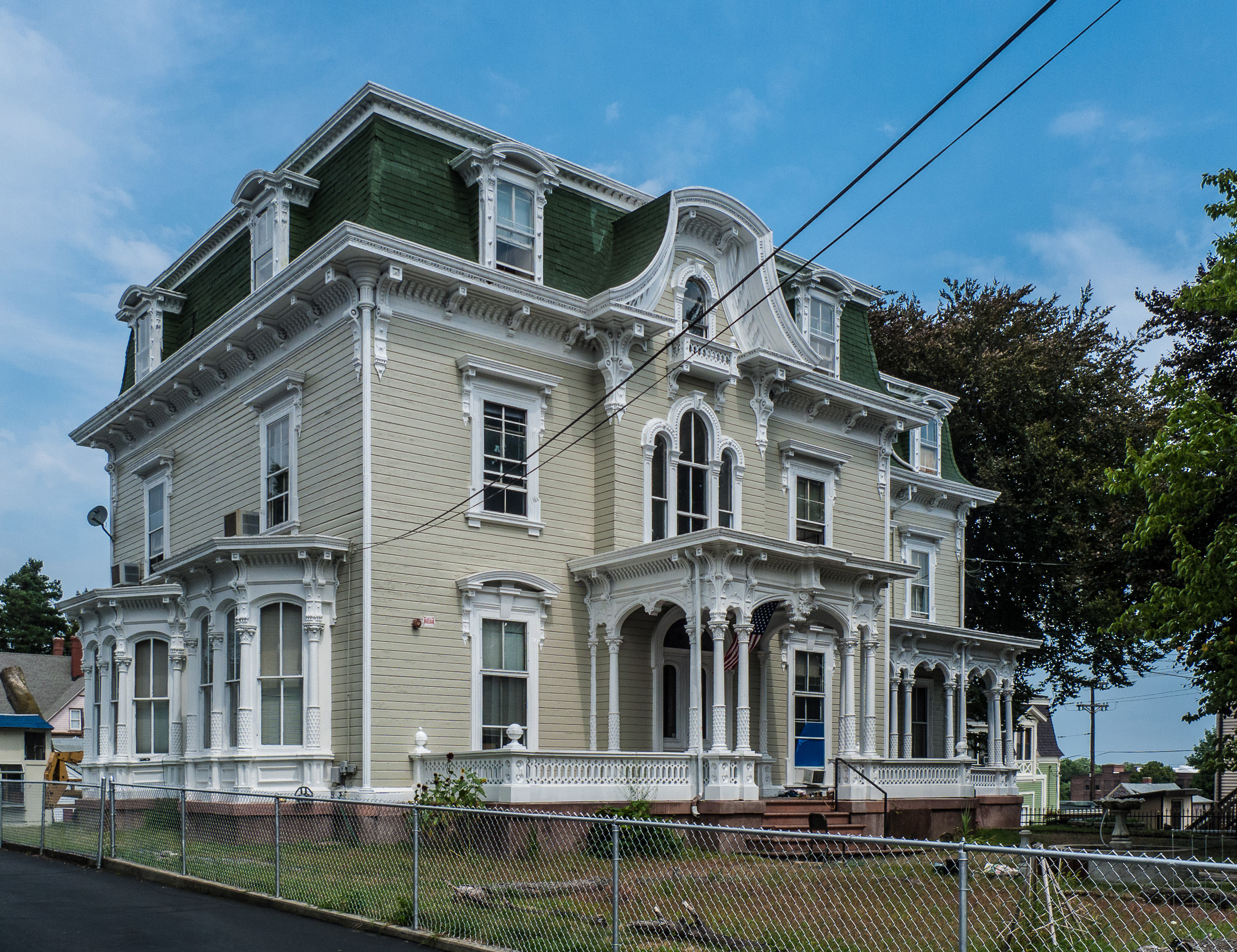
Benjamin F. Greene House, Central Falls, 1868.

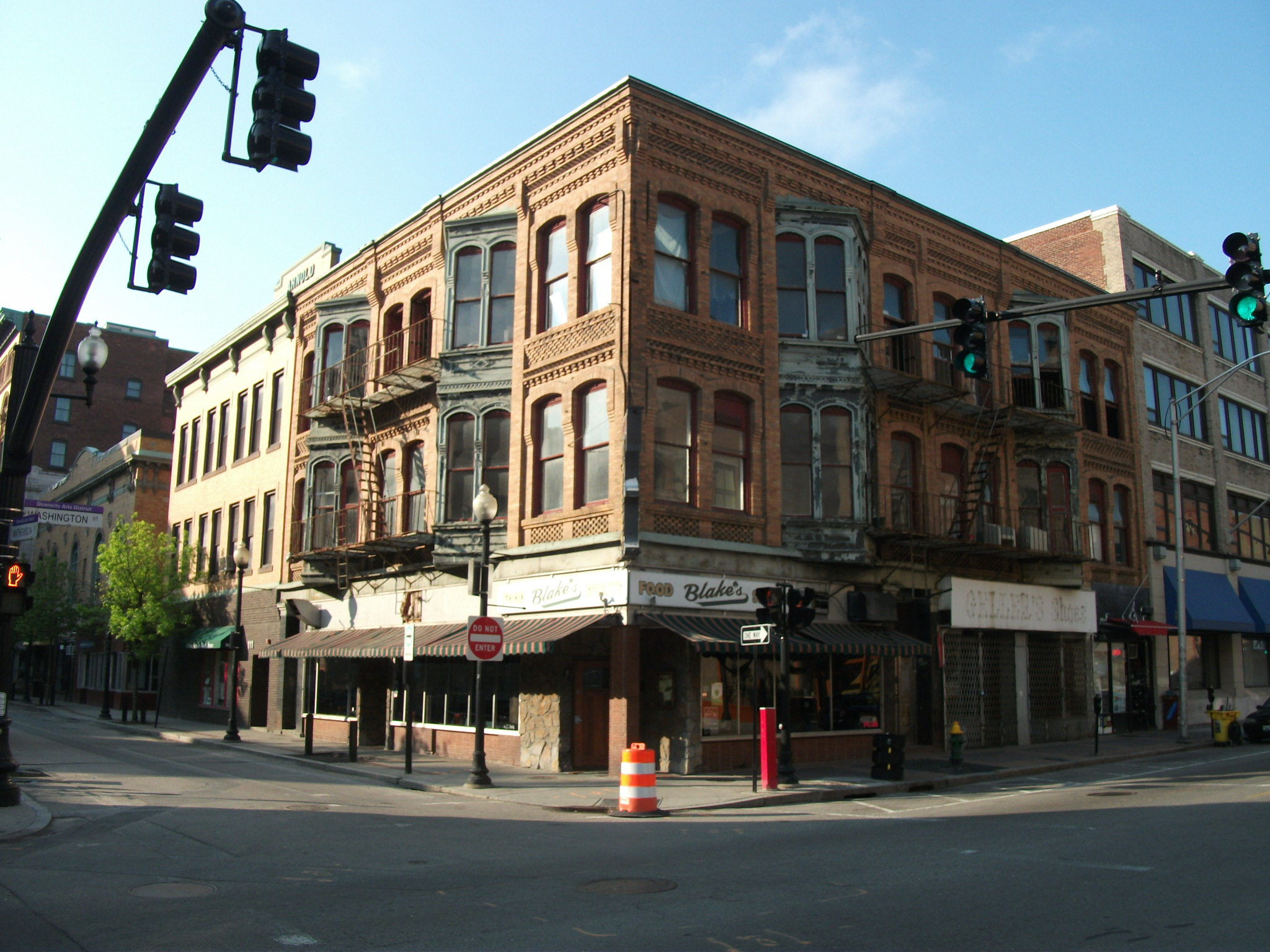
Arnold Building, Providence, 1895.

Clifton A. Hall (1826–1913) was an American architect from Providence, Rhode Island.

== Biography ==
Hall was born in Boston to Charles G. Hall, an architect, who had come to Boston in 1820. Hall first appears to have worked with architect George M. Dexter, and was the builder of Dexter's 1847-48 block of houses at 92-99 Beacon Street. Hall afterwards entered the employ of his father's firm, C. G. & J. R. Hall. He first came to Providence in 1850, to supervise the construction of that firm's What Cheer Block.

In 1855, he established a partnership with architect Alpheus C. Morse in the firm of Morse & Hall. Their only known built commission is the Merchants Bank Building in Providence, as the firm only lasted for a few months. He practiced alone until 1884, when he made Charles R. Makepeace partner, in the firm of Hall & Makepeace. That firm was dissolved in 1886. From then until his death, he practiced alone. He was highly regarded in his lifetime as an architect of churches, private residences, and mills.

== Architectural works ==
=== Morse & Hall, 1855 ===
- 1855 - Merchants Bank Building, 20 Westminster St, Providence, Rhode Island
- 1855 - Providence City Hall (Competition Entry), 25 Dorrance St, Providence, Rhode Island
  - One of only two known competitors, the other being Thomas A. Tefft. Neither design was built.

=== Clifton A. Hall, 1855-1884 ===
- 1856 - Clifton A. Hall Duplex, 369-371 Broad St, Providence, Rhode Island
  - Hall occupied 371 Broad until his death.
- 1858 - St. John's Episcopal Church, 191 County Rd, Barrington, Rhode Island
- 1859 - Emmanuel Episcopal Church at Brook Hill, 1214 Wilmer Ave, Richmond, Virginia
- 1862 - Robert W. Haxall House, 513 E Grace St, Richmond, Virginia
  - Demolished in 1926.
- 1863 - Atlantic Mills, 118 Manton Ave, Olneyville, Rhode Island
- 1863 - Elmwood Congregational Church, 353 Elmwood Ave, Providence, Rhode Island
  - Demolished in 1914.
- 1863 - Robert Knight House, 297 Elmwood Ave, Providence, Rhode Island
  - Demolished.
- 1863 - Pontiac Mills, Knight St, Pontiac, Rhode Island
- 1864 - Gatehouse, Juniper Hill Cemetery, 24 Sherry Ave, Bristol, Rhode Island
- 1864 - Trinity M. E. Church, 375 Broad St, Providence, Rhode Island
- 1866 - St. John's Episcopal Church (Transepts), 271 N Main St, Providence, Rhode Island
- 1866 - Charles A. Nichols House, Morris & Hazard Aves, Providence, Rhode Island
  - Demolished in 1927, but the carriage house at 45 Hazard still stands.
- 1866 - Thomas Goff House, 415 Angell St, Providence, Rhode Island
- 1866 - William P. Vaughan Duplex, 182-184 Waterman St, Providence, Rhode Island
- 1867 - Christ Episcopal Church, 909 Eddy St, Providence, Rhode Island
  - Moved across Eddy in 1888 for the construction of the later church, and ultimately demolished.
- 1867 - David G. Fales House (Remodeling), 476 High St, Central Falls, Rhode Island
- 1867 - William R. Huston House, 309 Benefit St, Providence, Rhode Island
- 1868 - Benjamin F. Greene House, 85 Cross St, Central Falls, Rhode Island
- 1868 - Curry & Richards Building, 170 Westminster St, Providence, Rhode Island
  - Demolished in 1900.
- 1870 - Thurbers Avenue Primary School, 179 Thurbers Ave, Providence, Rhode Island
  - Demolished.
- 1872 - Providence Gas Co. Gasometer, Crary & Hospital Sts, Providence, Rhode Island
  - Demolished.
- 1873 - Point Street Grammar School, Plain, Point, & Grove Sts, Providence, Rhode Island
  - Demolished for the construction of the interstate.
- 1875 - Oxford Street Grammar School, 166 Oxford St, Providence, Rhode Island
  - Demolished.
- 1876 - Gate, Juniper Hill Cemetery, 24 Sherry Ave, Bristol, Rhode Island
- 1880 - Slade Building, 44 Washington St, Providence, Rhode Island
  - In an 1895 remodeling, Hall added the building's prominent tower.

=== Hall & Makepeace, 1884-1886 ===
- 1885 - St. John's Episcopal Church (Chapel), 191 County Rd, Barrington, Rhode Island
- 1886 - Sanitary Gymnasium, 18 Aborn St, Providence, Rhode Island
  - Demolished in 1896.

=== Clifton A. Hall, from 1886 ===
- 1888 - St. John's Episcopal Church (Tower), 191 County Rd, Barrington, Rhode Island
- 1889 - Deutsche Hall, 155 Niagara St, Providence, Rhode Island
  - Demolished.
- 1895 - Arnold Building, 126 Washington St, Providence, Rhode Island
- 1897 - Charles R. Makepeace House, 275 Wayland Ave, Providence, Rhode Island
  - A house for Hall's former business partner, mill architect and engineer Charles R. Makepeace. Demolished c.2000.
