= David G. Fales House =

Historic house in Rhode Island, United States

- U.S. National Register of Historic Places
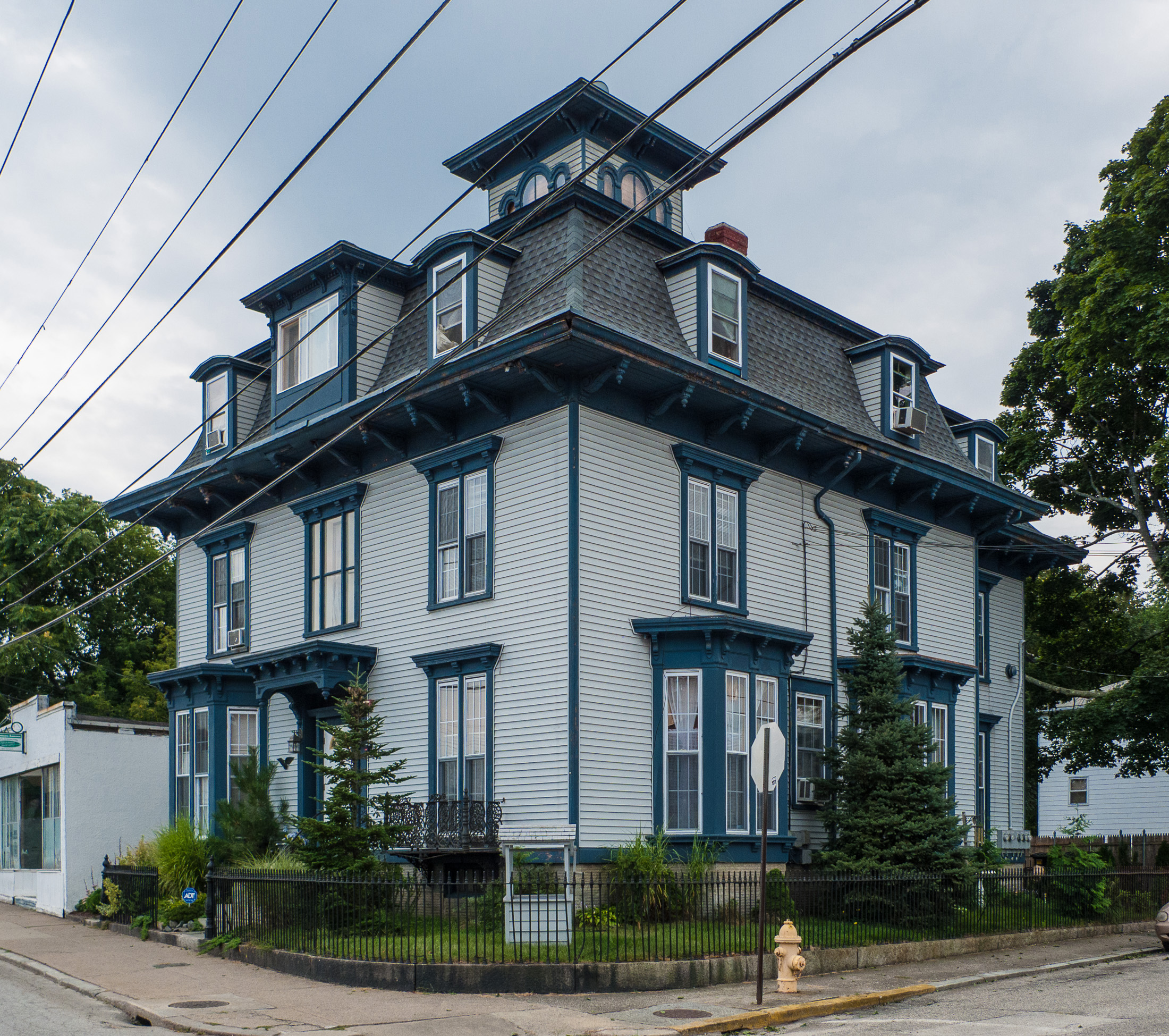

- Location within Rhode Island Location within the United States
- Location: 476 High Street, Central Falls, Rhode Island
- Coordinates: 41°53′10″N 71°23′5″W
- Area: less than one acre
- Built: 1858
- Architect: Clifton A. Hall
- Architectural style: Second Empire
- MPS: Central Falls MRA
- NRHP reference No.: 79000006
- Added to NRHP: April 6, 1979

The David G. Fales House is a historic house located at 476 High Street in Central Falls, Rhode Island.

== Description and history ==
The 2 1/2-story, wood-framed house was built in about 1858 and remodeled in a Second Empire style to a design by Clifton A. Hall in 1867. It has a mansard roof with flared eaves studded with brackets, and bracketed bay windows on two sides. The interior was gutted when the house caught fire in the 1960s.

The house was listed on the National Register of Historic Places on April 6, 1979.

== See also ==
- National Register of Historic Places listings in Providence County, Rhode Island
