= Sayles Memorial Hall =

- U.S. Historic district – Contributing property
- U.S. National Historic Landmark District – Contributing property
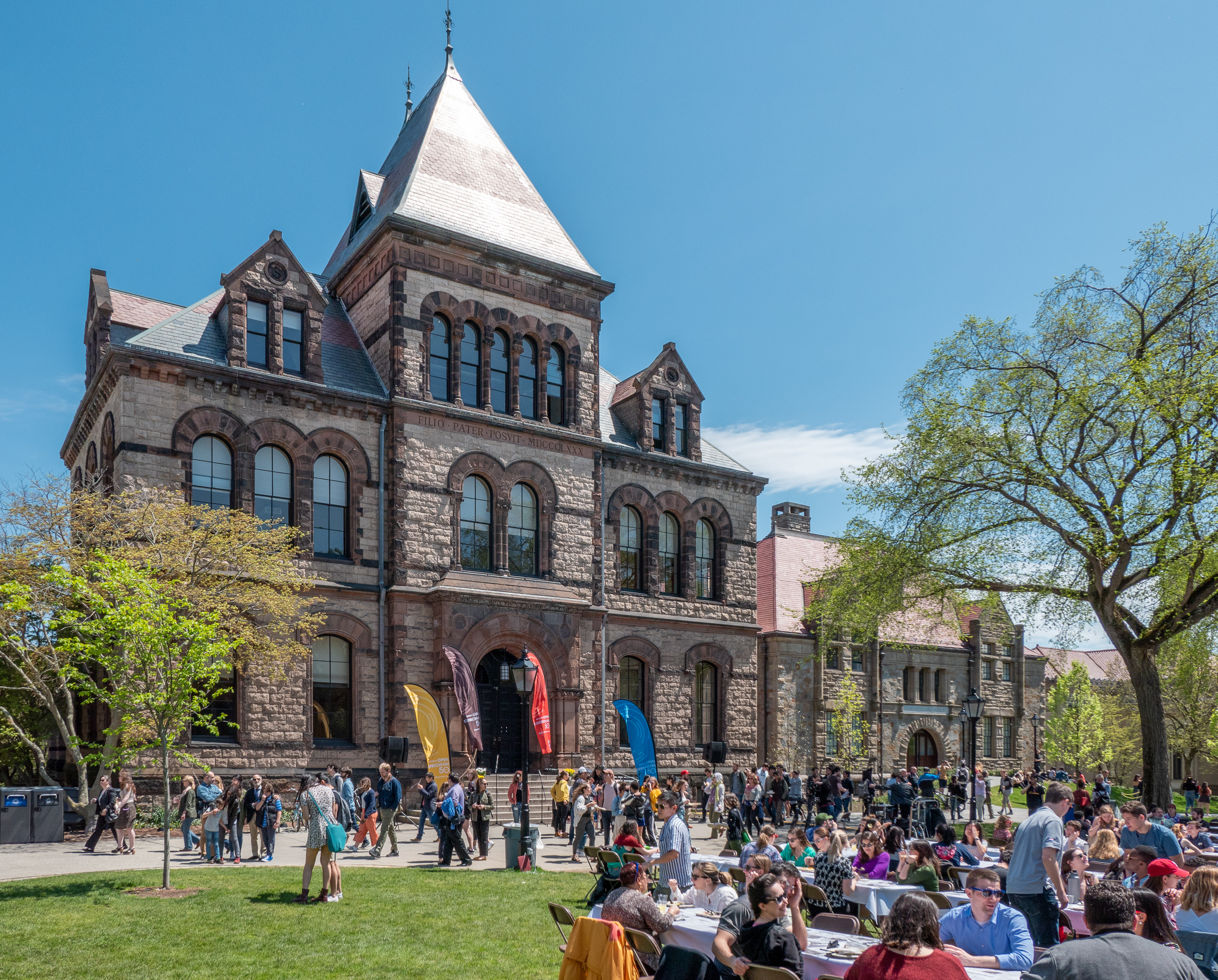
- Location: Brown University; Providence, Rhode Island
- Coordinates: 41.82625°N 71.40258°W
- Built: 1879–1881
- Architect: Alpheus C. Morse
- Architectural style: Richardsonian Romanesque
- Part of: College Hill Historic District (ID70000019)

Significant dates
- Designated CP: November 10, 1970
- Designated NHLDCP: December 30, 1970

Sayles Memorial Hall is a Richardsonian Romanesque hall on the central campus of Brown University in Providence, Rhode Island. The granite structure was designed by Alpheus C. Morse and constructed from 1879 to 1881.

== History ==
Sayles Hall was built in memoriam of William Clark Sayles, who entered Brown in 1874 and died in 1876. In 1878 Sayles' father gifted the school $50,000 for the construction of a building in his son's honor “which shall be exclusively and forever devoted to lectures and recitations, and to meetings on academic occasions.”

== Structure ==
The building is constructed of rock-faced Westerly granite with Longmeadow brownstone trim.

The structure follows a T-shaped plan. The front section measures 35 by 75 feet and is topped by a hipped roof; the rear of the building has a gabled roof. The main auditorium of the building is characterized by pine roof trusses.

=== Organ ===
The building is home to a 1903 Hutchings-Votey organ gifted to the university by Lucian Sharpe. Today, the organ is the largest remaining Hutchings-Votey organ of its type. The organ is used for an annual Halloween concert which begins at midnight.

=== Portraits ===
The main auditorium of the structure is adorned with 35 historical and contemporary portraits of leaders and benefactors of the university. In 1997, a portrait of Sarah Elizabeth Doyle was stolen from the building. In 2016, the university installed a portrait of President Emerita Ruth Simmons, making her the first and only Black woman represented in the collection.

== Gallery ==
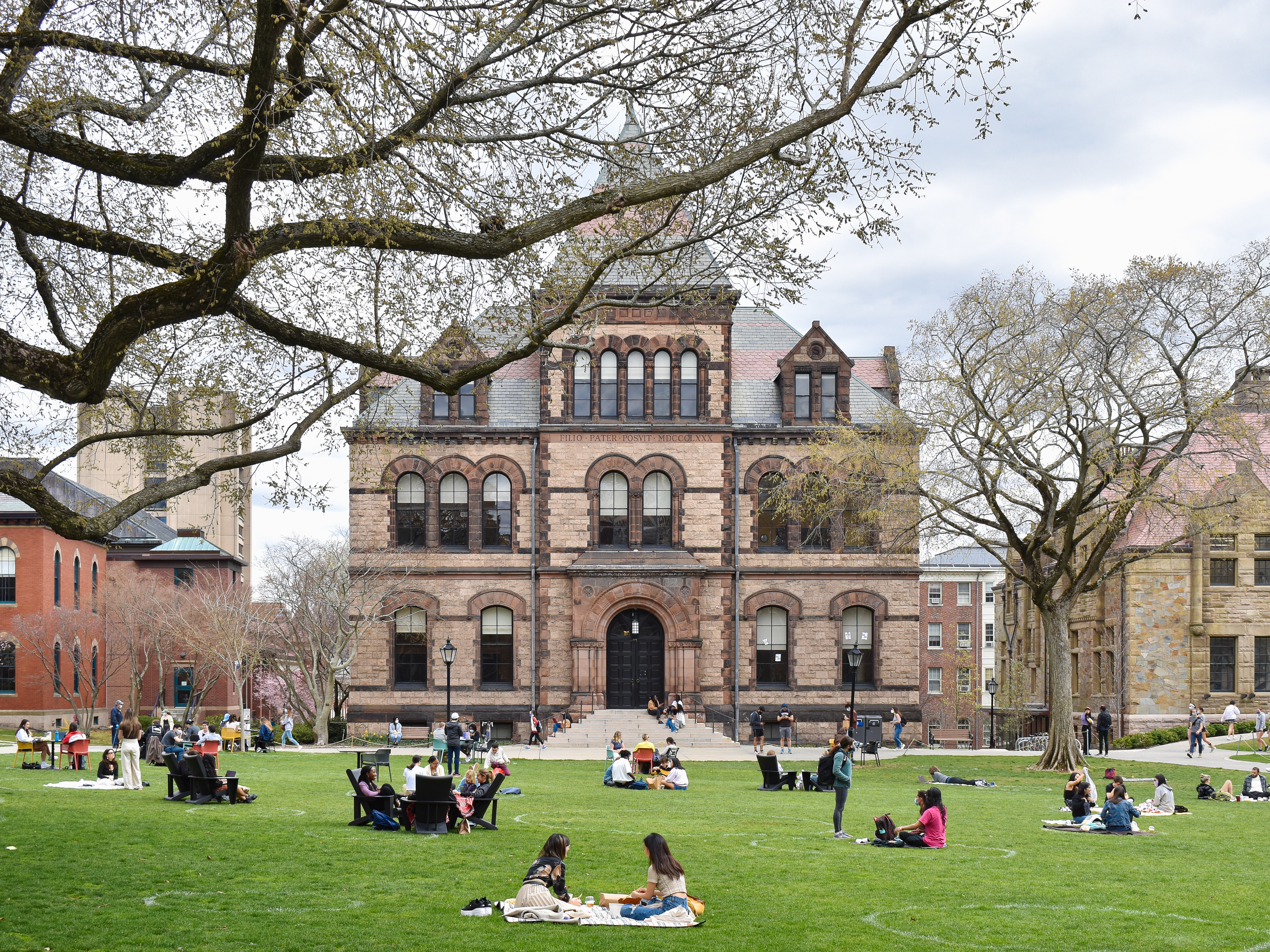

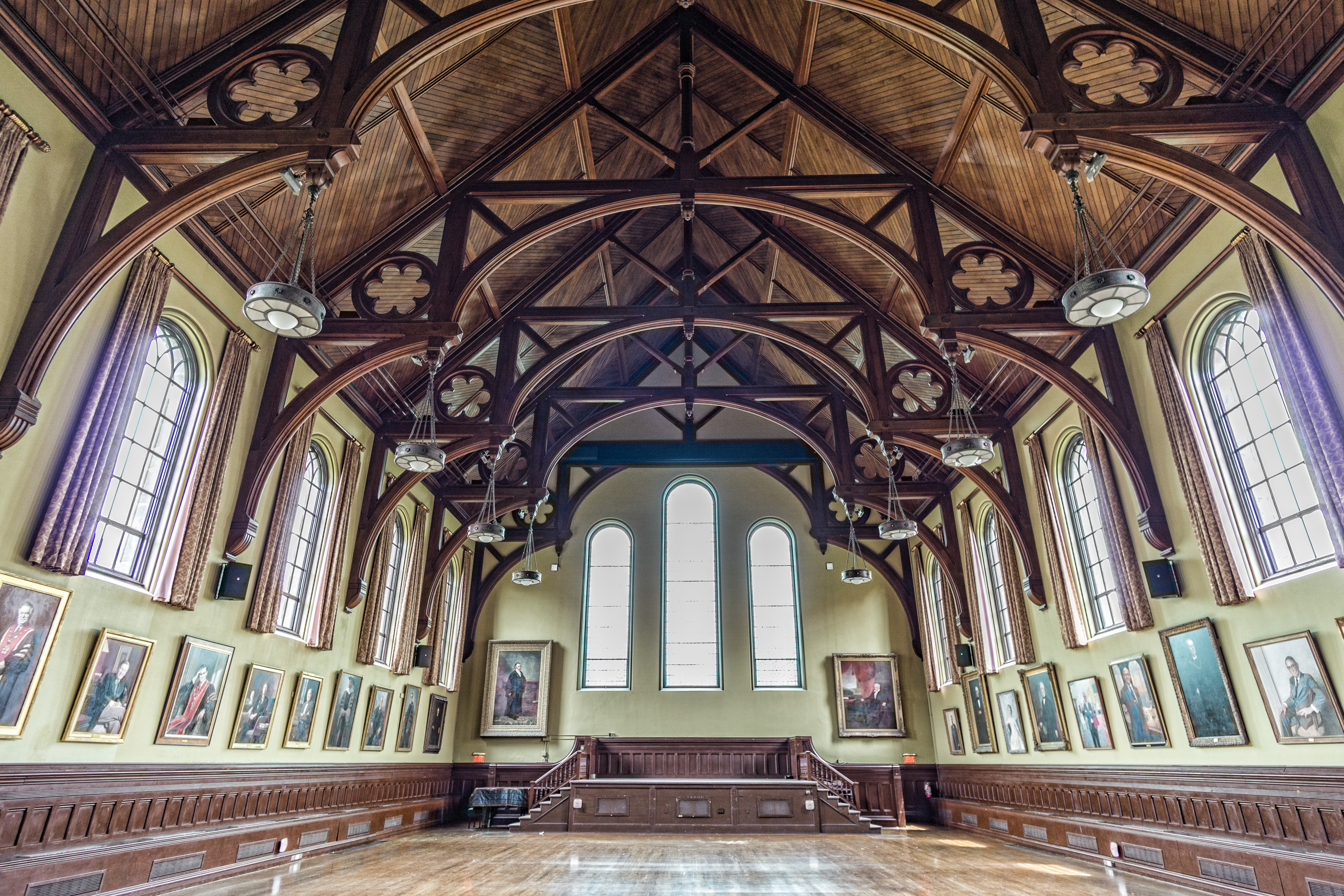
