= Main Street Historic District (Haverhill, Massachusetts) =

Historic district in Massachusetts, United States

- U.S. National Register of Historic Places
- U.S. Historic district
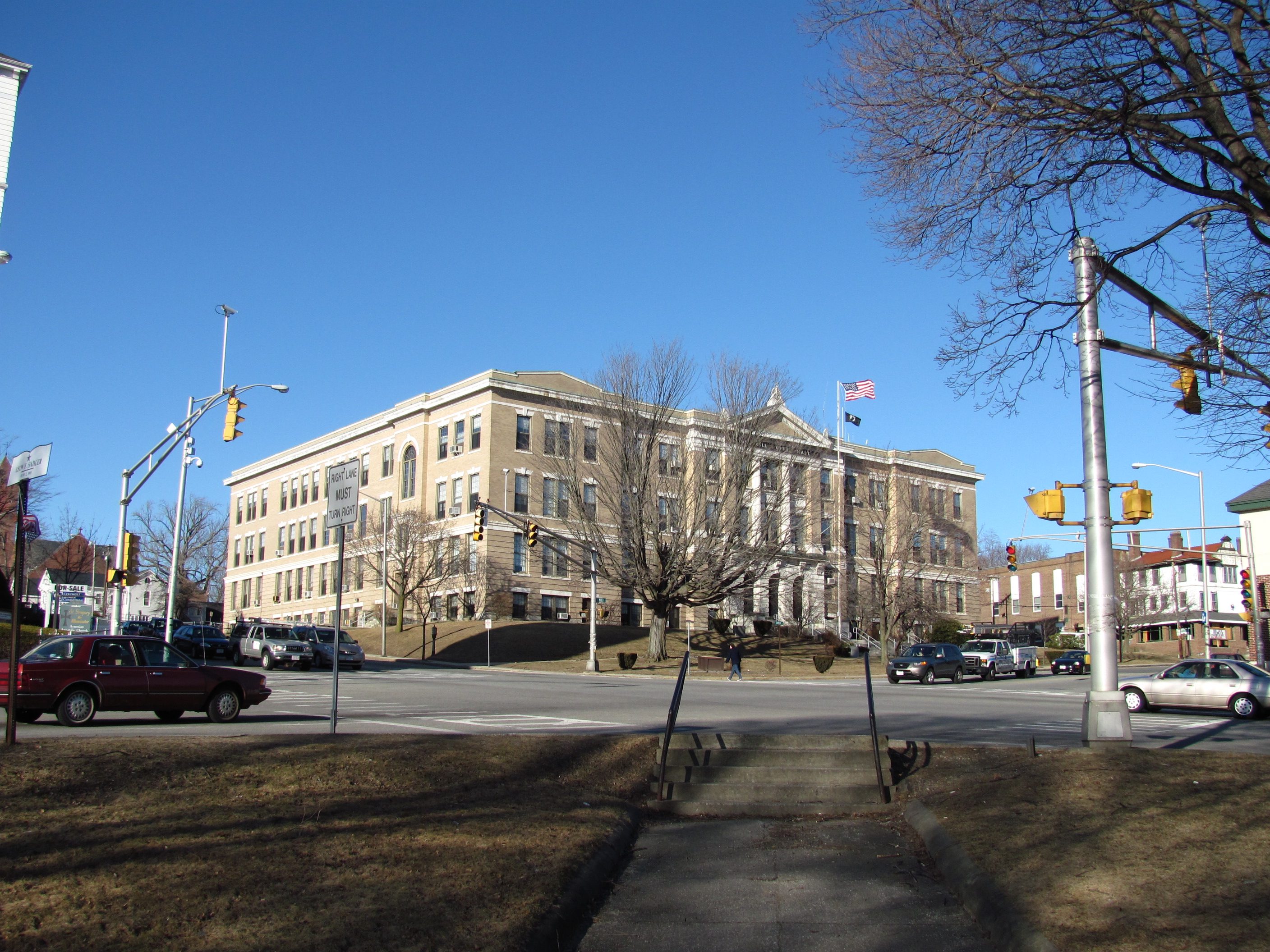
- Haverhill City Hall

- Location within Massachusetts Location within the United States
- Location: Haverhill, Massachusetts
- Coordinates: 42°46′42″N 71°4′42″W
- Area: 13 acres (5.3 ha)
- Architect: multiple
- Architectural style: Romanesque, Stick/Eastlake
- NRHP reference No.: 03000383
- Added to NRHP: May 9, 2003

The Main Street Historic District in Haverhill, Massachusetts represents the civic core of Haverhill and a gateway to the city's Highlands neighborhood and lakes district. Overlooking a mid-20th century urban renewal clearance area northeast of the main business and industrial district of the city, it was listed on the National Register of Historic Places in 2003.

== Description and history ==
The district includes properties along Main Street between White Street and Arlington Street to the north, and Crescent Place and Summer Street to the south. Its principal features include the Renaissance-revival style Haverhill High School building, now Haverhill City Hall (C.Willis Damon, 1909); the 18th and 19th century town common (now known as G.A.R. Park) with its bronze statue of the colonial heroine Hannah Duston (Calvin Weeks, 1879); and three Romanesque Revival style churches including, the Italianate First Parish Meetinghouse, now Armenian Church (Alpheus C. Morse, 1848); the Germanic First Congregational Church (John Stevens, 1859); and the Richardsonian romanesque style First Baptist Church (Edgar Allen Poe Newcomb, 1883).

In addition to being the city's center of civic and religious activity, the district includes some of its finest houses, built by prominent local businessmen. The Carleton House at 185 Main Street is a particularly high-quality Italianate house, with Tuscan pilasters, bracketed deep eaves, and molded window hoods with bracketing. The Hunking House, 160 Main Street, exemplifies the evolution of architecture: built as a typical Greek Revival house, it was moved to its present location in 1871 and expanded with Italianate details, and remodeled again with Classical Revival details in 1923 when it was converted for use by the local American Legion branch. The Chase House, 148 Main Street, is a fine example Stick style, built c. 1887-81.

== See also ==
- National Register of Historic Places listings in Essex County, Massachusetts
