= Thomas F. Hoppin House =

Historic house in Rhode Island, United States

- U.S. National Register of Historic Places
- U.S. National Historic Landmark District – Contributing property
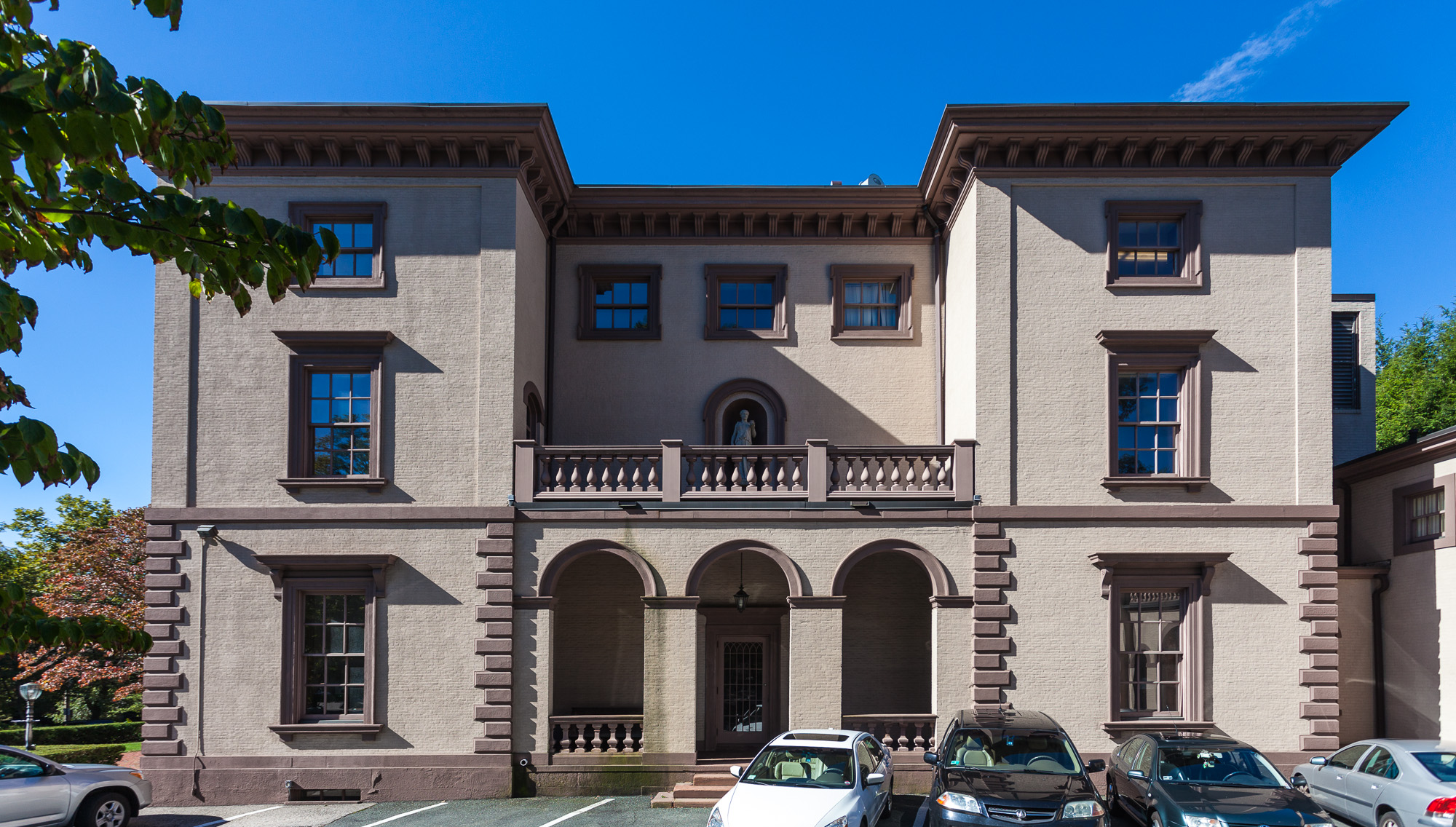

- Location within Rhode Island Location within the United States
- Location: 383 Benefit Street; Providence, Rhode Island
- Coordinates: 41°49′17″N 71°24′11″W
- Built: 1853
- Architect: Alpheus C. Morse
- Architectural style: Italianate
- Part of: College Hill Historic District (ID70000019)
- NRHP reference No.: 73000072

Significant dates
- Added to NRHP: February 6, 1973
- Designated NHLDCP: November 10, 1970

The Thomas F. Hoppin House is a historic house at 383 Benefit Street in the College Hill neighborhood of Providence, Rhode Island. The house was built c. 1853 to a design by Alpheus C. Morse, and is an elaborate local example of an Italianate palazzo-style residence. The Library of Congress called the property "one of the largest and most elegant houses built in Providence in the mid-nineteenth century."

== History ==
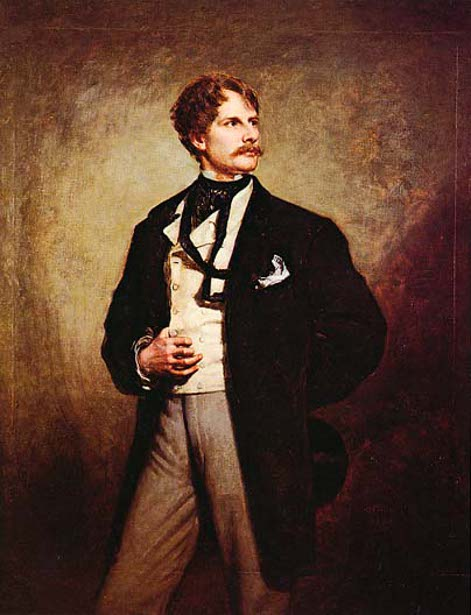
Thomas Frederick Hoppin (1816-1873) by George Peter Alexander Healy

The original house on the property was built by John Innes Clark in 1788. In the early 19th century the house was owned by manufacturer William Jenkins and his wife, Anna (Almy) Jenkins. He died in 1846, and in 1849 the house burned in a devastating fire which killed his widow and their eldest daughter, Sarah Brown. Their younger children, 17-year-old Anna Almy and 15-year-old Moses Brown, had been awakened by the family dog, giving them enough warning to escape.

Anna, having now inherited the fortunes of two of her grandfathers, William Almy and Moses Brown, was described as the wealthiest woman in America. Three years after the fire, she married Thomas Frederick Hoppin (1816-1873), son of Thomas Coles Hoppin and Harriet Dunn (Jones) Hoppin. Hoppin was a painter, sculptor and engraver and a member of a prominent local family of diplomats, physicians, artists and architects which included his brother, illustrator Augustus Hoppin. They soon initiated the design and construction of a new house on the site. To design their new house, they hired Boston artist and architect Alpheus C. Morse, who Thomas Hoppin persuaded to move to Providence. For the Hoppins, Morse designed an elaborate Italianate villa. To memorialize Anna's elder sister, who had last been seen at a window holding a pitcher, Morse and Hoppin included a statue of a young woman with a pitcher in a niche above the east-facing family entrance.

At one time, the front lawn was home to "The Sentinel," a bronze statue of the Jenkins family dog, which was designed by Thomas Hoppin and cast by the Gorham Manufacturing Company; the statue was later moved to Roger Williams Park. After the death of Thomas Hoppin in 1873 Anna remarried to Henry Alden Babbit, with whom she lived out of state and at Smith's Castle in North Kingstown. Over the rest of her life the house was often rented, especially as an event venue. The elaborate decorations for one of these events, an 1877 ball given by then-Senator Ambrose Burnside in honor of President Rutherford B. Hayes, caused the house to become known as the "house of a thousand candles." Anna died in 1919 and her heirs sold the house in 1920. Over the following decades the house was used first by the Episcopal church and later as offices.

The house was listed on the National Register of Historic Places in 1973. In 1984 it was restored by Robinson Green Beretta, an architectural firm which had had its offices there since 1951 and had bought it outright in 1982. The firm moved out in 1988. From 2001 until 2019 the mansion was home to the Annenberg Institute for School Reform at Brown University. In 2021, Brown sold the property for $2 million. The new owner intends to implement a "first class renovation" and convert the property to a luxury apartment building with about a half dozen units.

== See also ==
- National Register of Historic Places listings in Providence, Rhode Island
