= Benjamin F. Greene House =

Historic house in Rhode Island, United States

- U.S. National Register of Historic Places
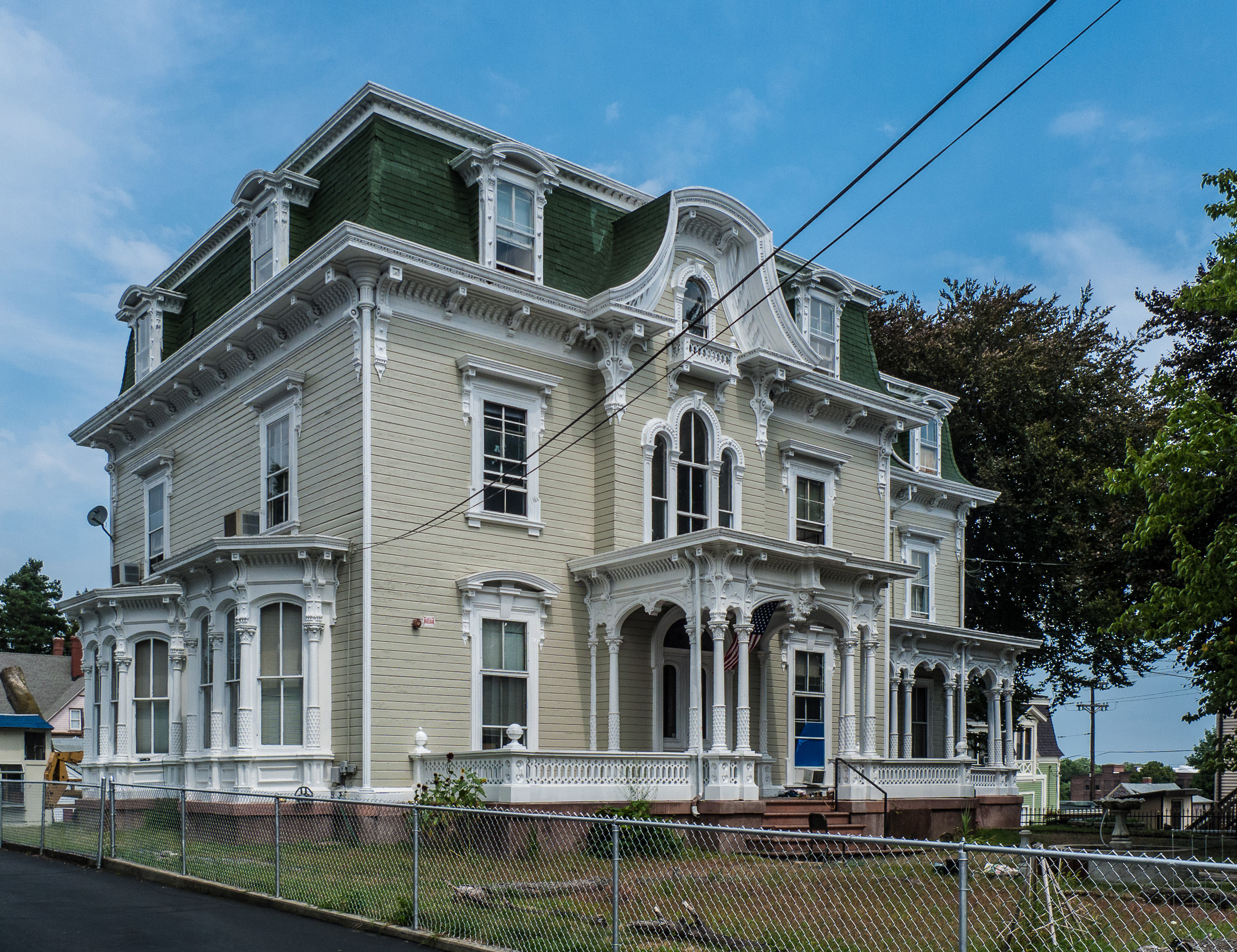
- Benjamin F. Greene House in 2013

- Location within Rhode Island Location within the United States
- Location: 85 Cross St., Central Falls, Rhode Island
- Coordinates: 41°53′08″N 71°23′10″W
- Area: 1 acre (0.40 ha)
- Built: 1868
- Architect: Clifton A. Hall; Wheeler & Marchant
- Architectural style: Second Empire
- MPS: Central Falls MRA
- NRHP reference No.: 79000007
- Added to NRHP: April 6, 1979

The Benjamin F. Greene House is an historic house at 85 Cross Street in Central Falls, Rhode Island, USA. The Second Empire house was designed by Clifton A. Hall and built by Wheeler & Marchant in 1868. The house is one of a small number of high-style mid-19th century houses in the city. It was built for Benjamin Franklin Greene, a second-generation mill owner in the Central Falls/Pawtucket area.

The house was listed on the National Register of Historic Places in 1979.

== See also ==
- National Register of Historic Places listings in Providence County, Rhode Island
- Second Empire style
