= Alpheus C. Morse =

American architect (1818–1893)

Alpheus Carey Morse
- Born: June 3, 1818; Boston, Massachusetts
- Died: November 25, 1893 (aged 75); Providence, Rhode Island
- Occupation: Architect

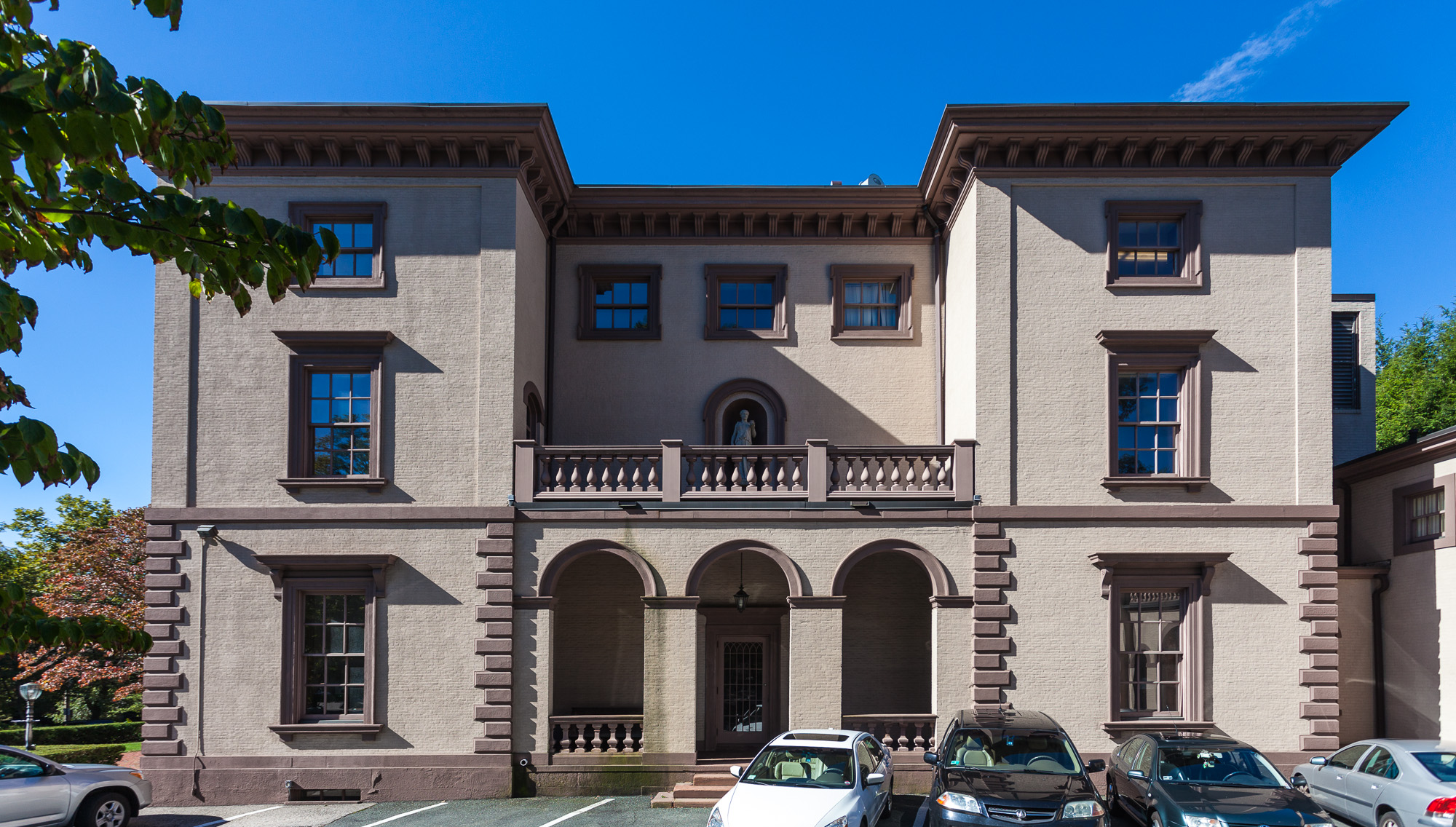
Thomas F. Hoppin House, Providence, Rhode Island, 1853–55.

Alpheus C. Morse (June 3, 1818 – November 25, 1893) was an American architect who spent most of his career in Providence, Rhode Island.

== Life and career ==
Alpheus Carey Morse was born June 3, 1818, in Boston, Massachusetts to Hazen and Lucy (Cary) Morse. Hazen Morse was a noted silversmith and engraver. He was named for stonecutter Alpheus Cary, his mother's father. He was educated in architecture in the office of Alexander Parris, then one of Boston's leading architects. In 1840 he hoped to gain further experience in the office of Richard Upjohn, then engaged on Trinity Church in New York, and an associate of Parris in 1834. However, Upjohn then did not have space for an additional student. By 1842 he apparently planned to invite him to join his office, though by this time Morse had already left the country to travel abroad. Morse, in the company of Seth Wells Cheney, traveled through Europe for five years, with a home base in Florence at the studio of Horatio Greenough. In Europe, Morse devoted much time to painting and crayon portraiture.

When he returned to Boston in 1847, Morse opened a studio on Tremont Row, where he at first continued that same work. His first architectural commission was a church in Haverhill, Massachusetts, his father's native town. About 1851 Morse joined the office of English immigrant architect George Snell, then engaged on the design of Boston Music Hall. Morse was responsible for much of the interior decoration, and the two architects briefly formed a partnership after the building was completed in 1852. However, the firm of Snell & Morse was short-lived, and was dissolved in 1853.

In the same year, Morse was commissioned to design a house in Providence for a close friend, the artist Thomas Frederick Hoppin. This house is and was considered one of the best local examples of Italianate architecture. After that project was completed in 1855, Morse chose to remain in Providence and establish an architectural practice. He formed a partnership with architect Clifton A. Hall, but this too proved short-lived, and Morse & Hall was dissolved in 1856. For the remainder of his career Morse would be a sole practitioner. After the departure from Providence and eventual death of Thomas Alexander Tefft, Morse was the city's leading architect for several years. From 1859 to 1861 he was assisted by Alfred Stone, who himself would become a leader in the profession.

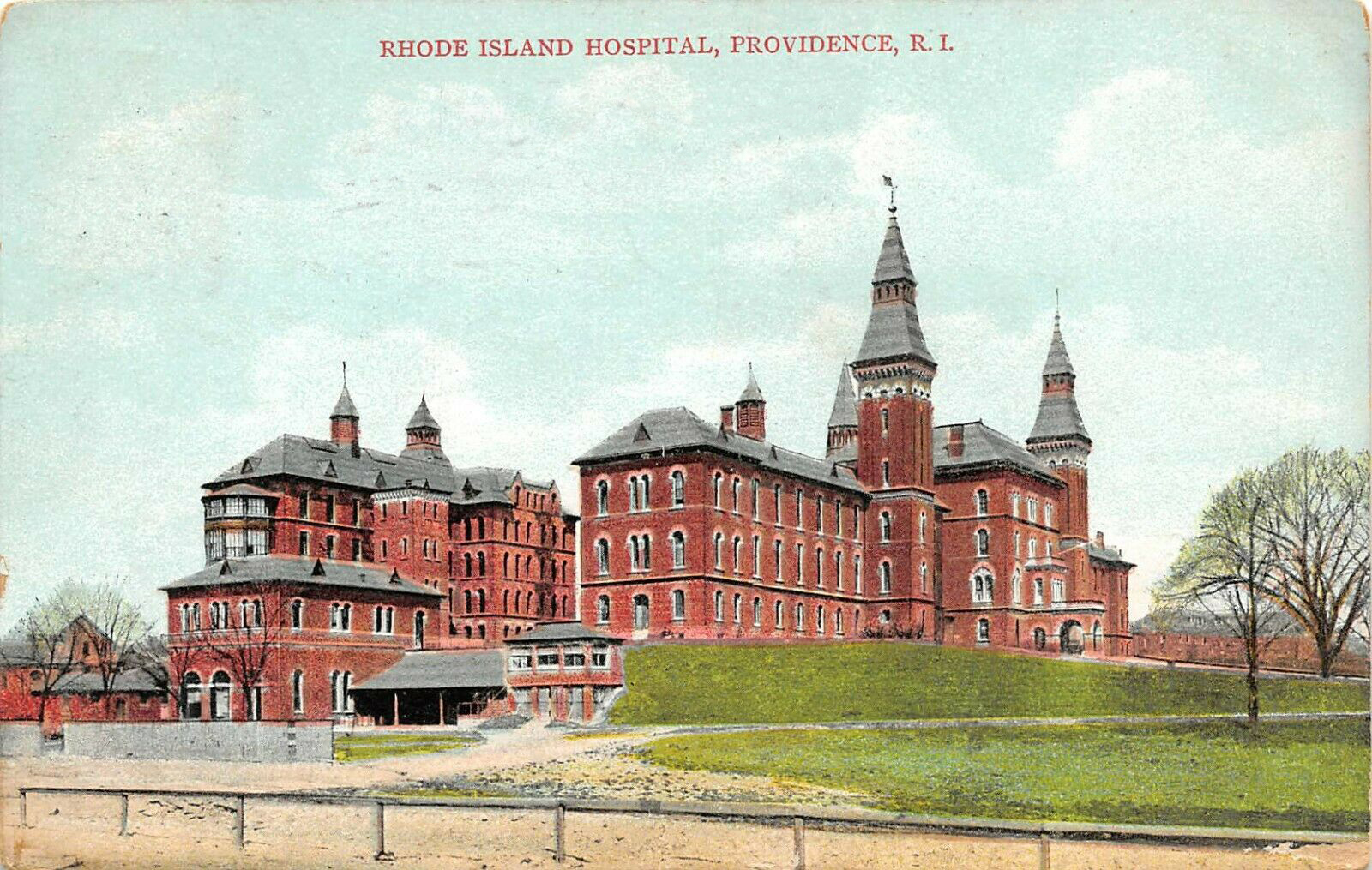
Original campus of Rhode Island Hospital (demolished and replaced with modern buildings starting in the 1950s)

Morse consistently relied on the architecture of the Italian Renaissance as a source for his own work, and was largely dedicated to that style. However, this fell out of favor in his later years, and he transitioned to other styles, including the High Victorian Gothic, Romanesque Revival and Queen Anne. Some of these works were innovative in the local context. Rogers Hall of Brown University, built in 1862, and the Rhode Island Hospital, built in 1864–68, were the first examples of polychrome Gothic architecture in the area. Sayles Memorial Hall, also at Brown, was one of the area's earliest examples of Richardsonian Romanesque architecture.

== Personal life ==
In 1855 Morse married Caroline Emily Pearce, daughter of Earl Douglas and Lydia (Wheaton) Pearce. The couple moved into the house at 44 Benefit Street, the southern half of a double house built in 1827 by Tallman & Bucklin for the bride's father as an investment. They lived there for the remainder of their lives, raising three daughters. Their eldest, Anne Goddard Morse, was educated as an artist in Boston and New York.

Brown University professors John Larkin Lincoln and George Ide Chace were both his brothers-in-law.

In 1868, Morse was awarded an honorary Master of Arts degree from Brown University.

Morse died November 25, 1893, at home in Providence after a brief illness, at the age of 75.

== Legacy ==
In 1857 Morse was a founding member and fellow of the American Institute of Architects, and in 1875 was founding president of the institute's Rhode Island chapter. He designed many prominent buildings in Providence, including the old Rhode Island Hospital and Sayles Hall on the campus of Brown University. Two of his projects have been listed on the United States National Register of Historic Places, and many others contribute to listed historic districts.

== Works ==
- First Parish Unitarian Church (former), (Note: Formerly a contributing property to the Main Street Historic District, listed on the National Register of Historic Places in 2003. The church was later an Episcopal church, and most recently the St. Gregory the Illuminator Armenian Church.) 130 Main St, Haverhill, Massachusetts (1847–48, demolished 2017)
- Interiors of Boston Music Hall (former), 1 Hamilton Pl, Boston, Massachusetts (1852, altered)
- House for Thomas Frederick Hoppin, (Note: A contributing property to the College Hill Historic District, listed on the National Register of Historic Places in 1970.) 383 Benefit St, Providence, Rhode Island (1853–55, NRHP 1973)
- Merchants Bank Building, (Note: The only known output of the short-lived partnership of Morse & Hall. A contributing property to the Downtown Providence Historic District, listed on the National Register of Historic Places in 1984.) 20 Westminster St, Providence, Rhode Island (1855–57, NRHP 1977)
- House for William Binney, (Note: Built for a son of Horace Binney of Philadelphia.) 72 Prospect St, Providence, Rhode Island (1859)
- House for Henry Albert Rhodes, 101 Benefit St, Providence, Rhode Island (1860–62)
- House for Amos Newell Beckwith, (Note: A contributing property to the Stimson Avenue Historic District, listed on the National Register of Historic Places in 1973.) 2 Stimson Ave, Providence, Rhode Island (1861–62)
- House for Smith Owen, (Note: A few years later Owen also built the Owen Buildings downtown.) 79 Prospect St, Providence, Rhode Island (1861)
- Rogers Hall, (Note: Now the Richard and Edna Salomon Center for Teaching.) Brown University, Providence, Rhode Island (1862)
- Rectory of the Cathedral of St. John (former), 144 Benefit St, Providence, Rhode Island (1863)
- House for Marcy (Mason) Gorham, 34 Benefit St, Providence, Rhode Island (1863–65)
- House for Rufus Waterman, 188 Benefit St, Providence, Rhode Island (1863)
- Rhode Island Hospital (former), (Note: Designed in association with architect Samuel Sloan of Philadelphia, who designed the floor plan.) 593 Eddy St, Providence, Rhode Island (1864–68, demolished 1956)
- House for James Humphreys, 147 Benefit St, Providence, Rhode Island (1864–66)
- House for William Gorham Angell, 30 Benefit St, Providence, Rhode Island (1864–67)
- Remodeling of house for William Slater, (Note: Incorporated an existing house built in 1838. Now Gerard House of Brown University.) 54 College St, Providence, Rhode Island (1867)
- Fernald Hall, (Note: A contributing property to the University of Maine at Orono Historic District, listed on the National Register of Historic Places in 1978.) University of Maine, Orono, Maine (1868–70)
- Atlantic Building, (Note: In 1892 partially demolished and incorporated into the new Industrial Trust Company Building, designed by Stone, Carpenter & Willson. Expanded in 1910 and demolished in 1970.) 49 Westminster St, Providence, Rhode Island (1869–70, altered 1892 and 1910, demolished 1970)
- Brown Mausoleum, North Burial Ground, Providence, Rhode Island (1869)
- Breck Building, 35 N Main St, Providence, Rhode Island (1870, demolished)
- House for Charles Hutchins Sprague, 17 Arch St, Providence, Rhode Island (1874)
- Double house for Lucian Sharpe, (Note: Built for the junior partner in Darling, Brown & Sharpe, later Brown & Sharpe. Moved from its former location at 130-132 Angell Street by Brown University in 2018.) 79 Brown St, Providence, Rhode Island (1874)
- Third Police Station and Wickenden Street Fire Station, 200 and 210 Wickenden St, Providence, Rhode Island (1876, demolished)
- House for William Francis Sayles, 103 Prospect St, Providence, Rhode Island (1878)
- Sayles Memorial Hall, Brown University, Providence, Rhode Island (1879–81)
- House for Henry Truman Beckwith, 68 Brown St, Providence, Rhode Island (1883)
- House for Mary Townsend (Bullock) Ames, 172 Cushing St, Providence, Rhode Island (1884–85)
- Carriage house and stable for Lucian Sharpe, 135 Angell St, Providence, Rhode Island (1885)
- House for Horatio Rogers Jr., 264 Bowen St, Providence, Rhode Island (1887)
- Sundial at Mount Vernon, (Note: Donated by the Rhode Island chapter of the Mount Vernon Ladies' Association. Since replaced.) Fairfax County, Virginia (1887, removed)
- House for William Carey Poland, 53 Lloyd Ave, Providence, Rhode Island (1890)

== Gallery ==
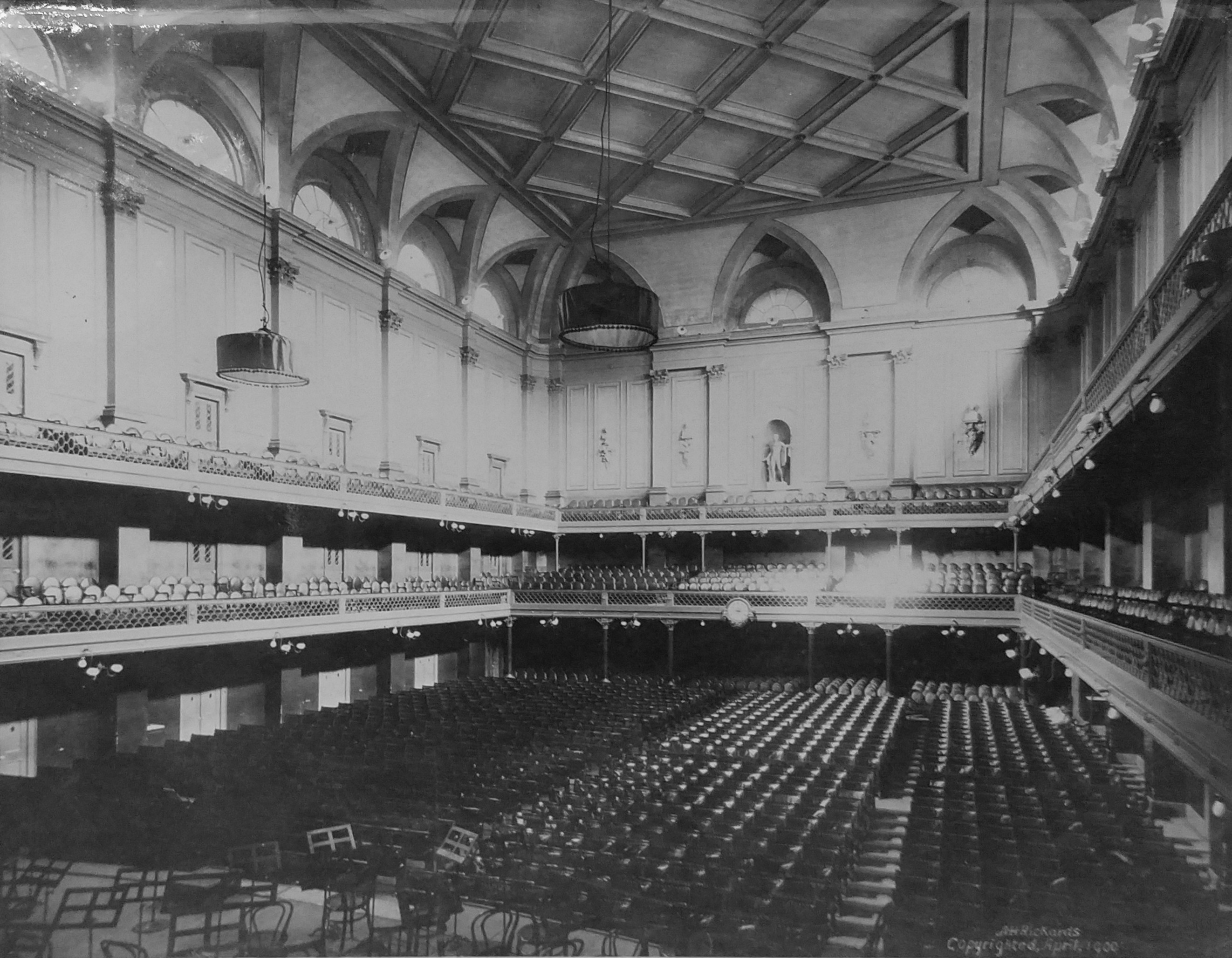
Interior of Boston Music Hall, Boston, Massachusetts, 1852.

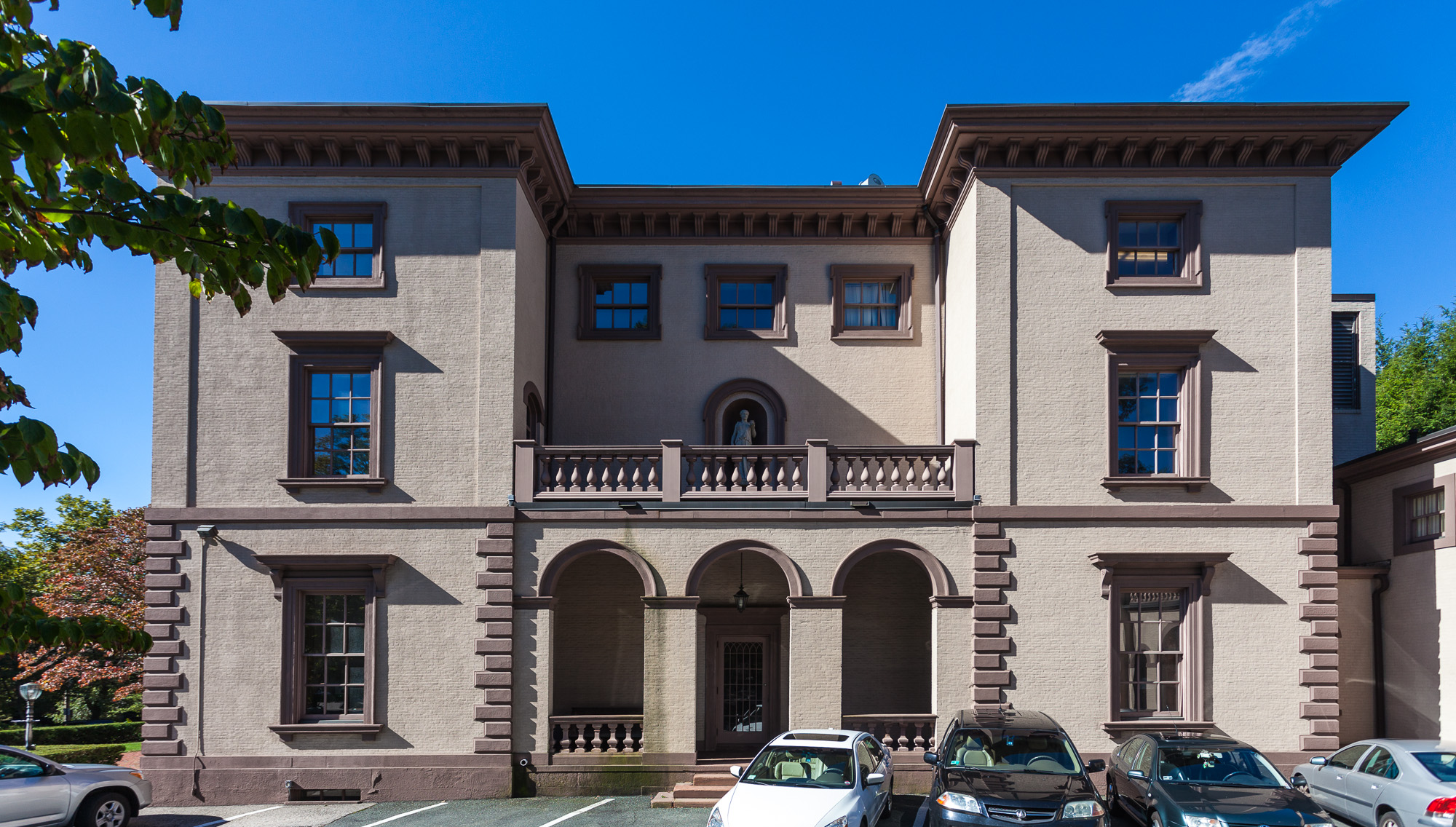
House for Thomas Frederick Hoppin, Providence, Rhode Island, 1853–55.

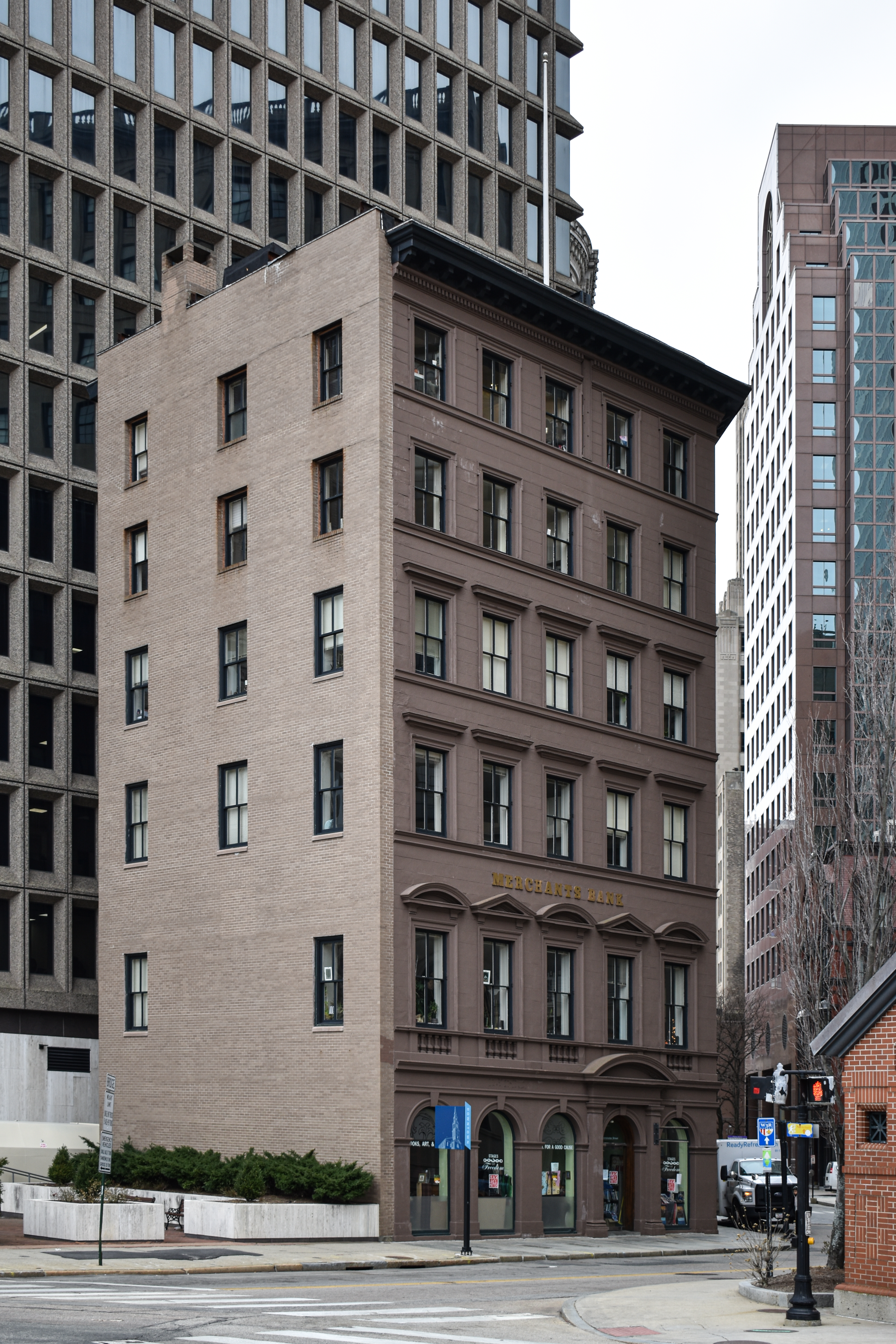
Merchants Bank Building, Providence, Rhode Island, 1855–57.

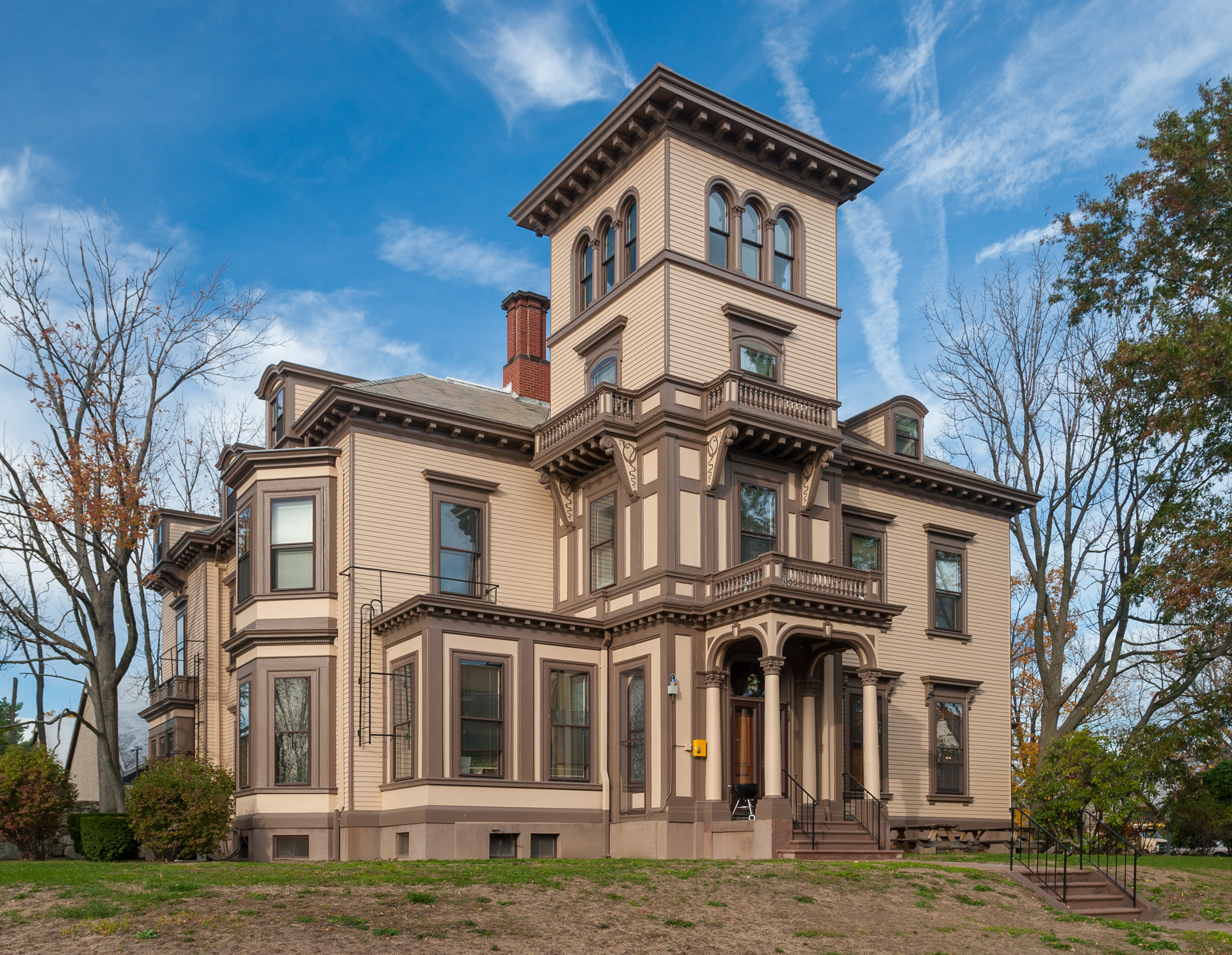
House for Amos Newell Beckwith, Providence, Rhode Island, 1861–62.

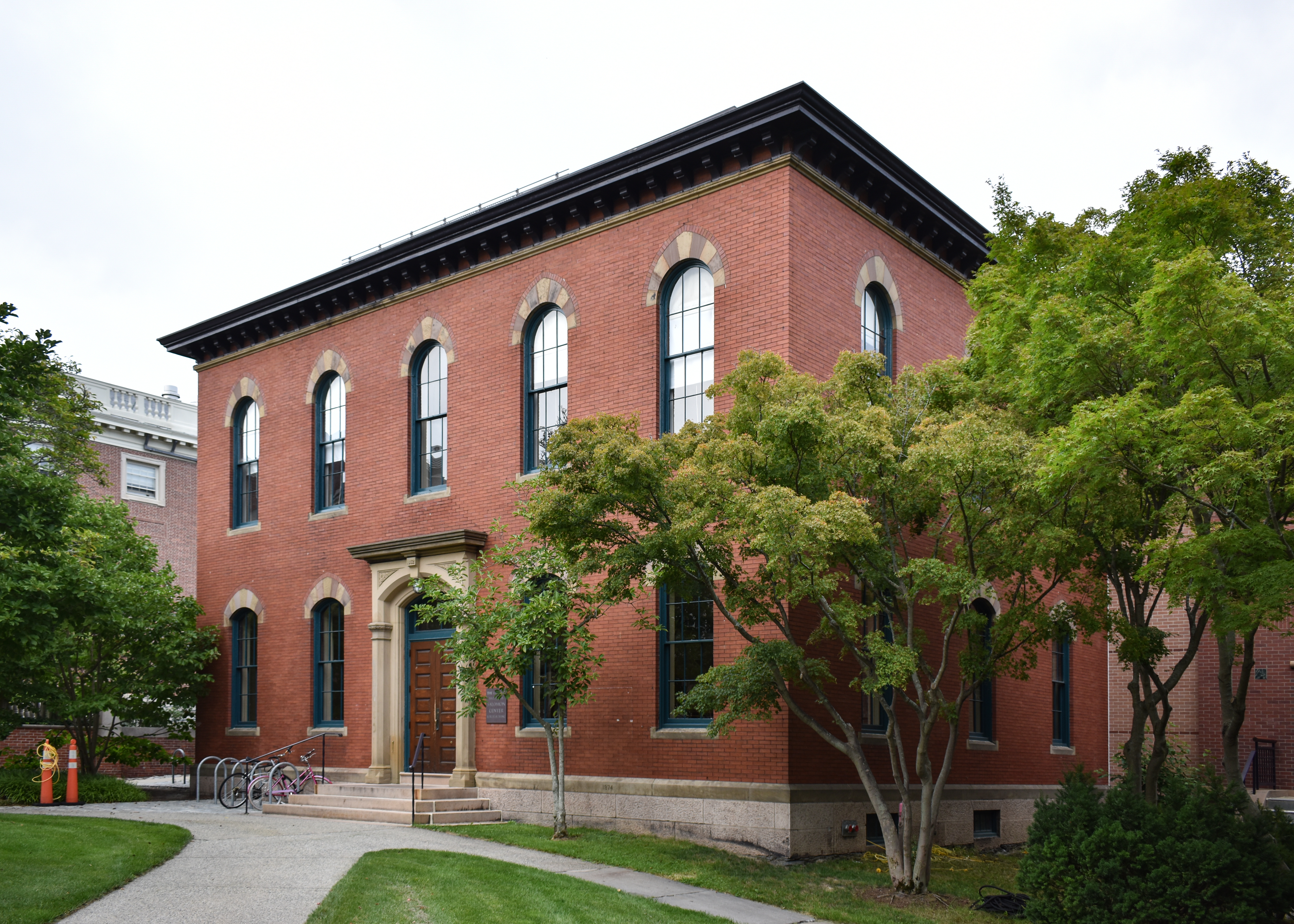
Rogers Hall, Brown University, Providence, Rhode Island, 1862.

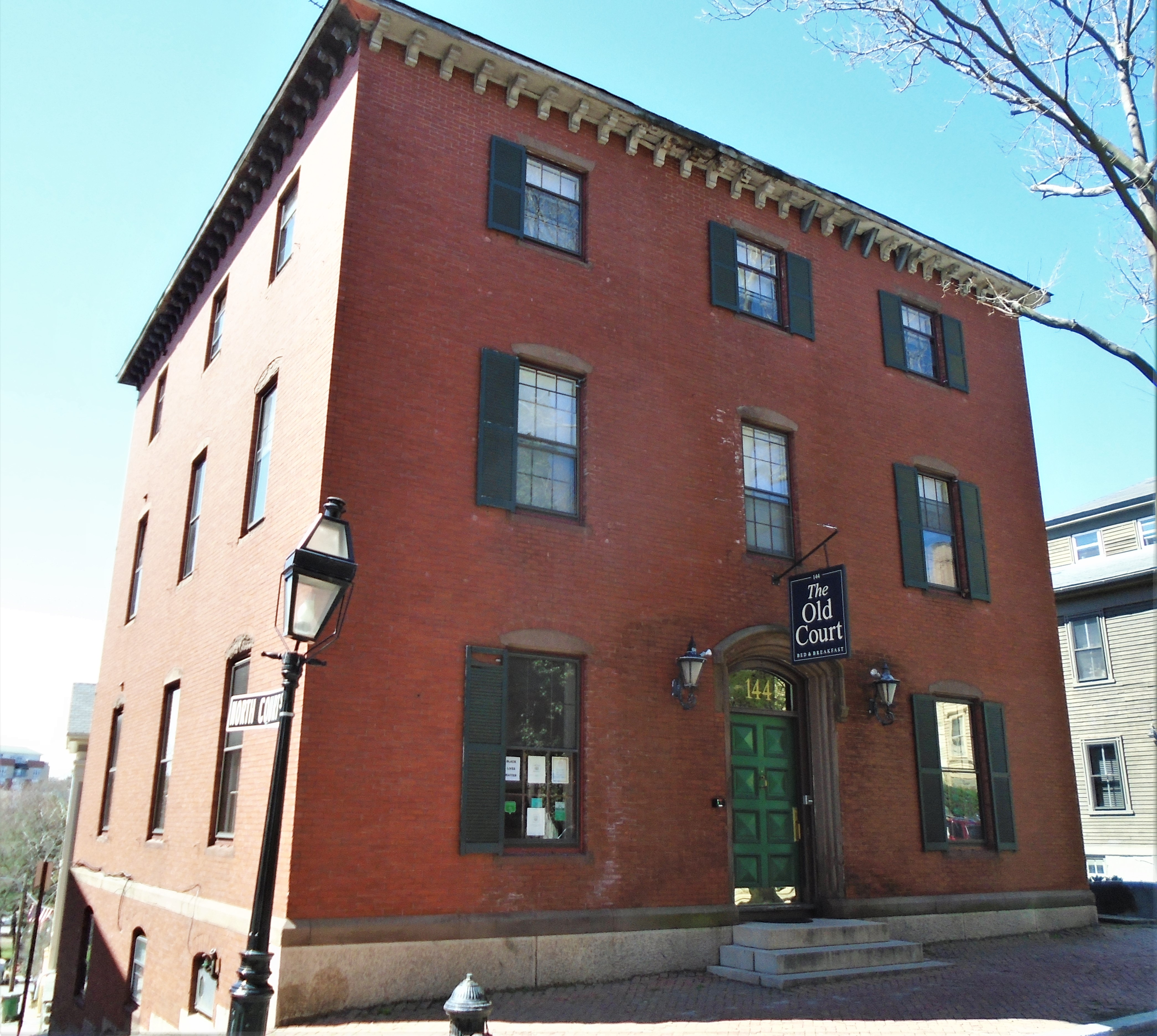
Rectory of the Cathedral of St. John, Providence, Rhode Island, 1863.

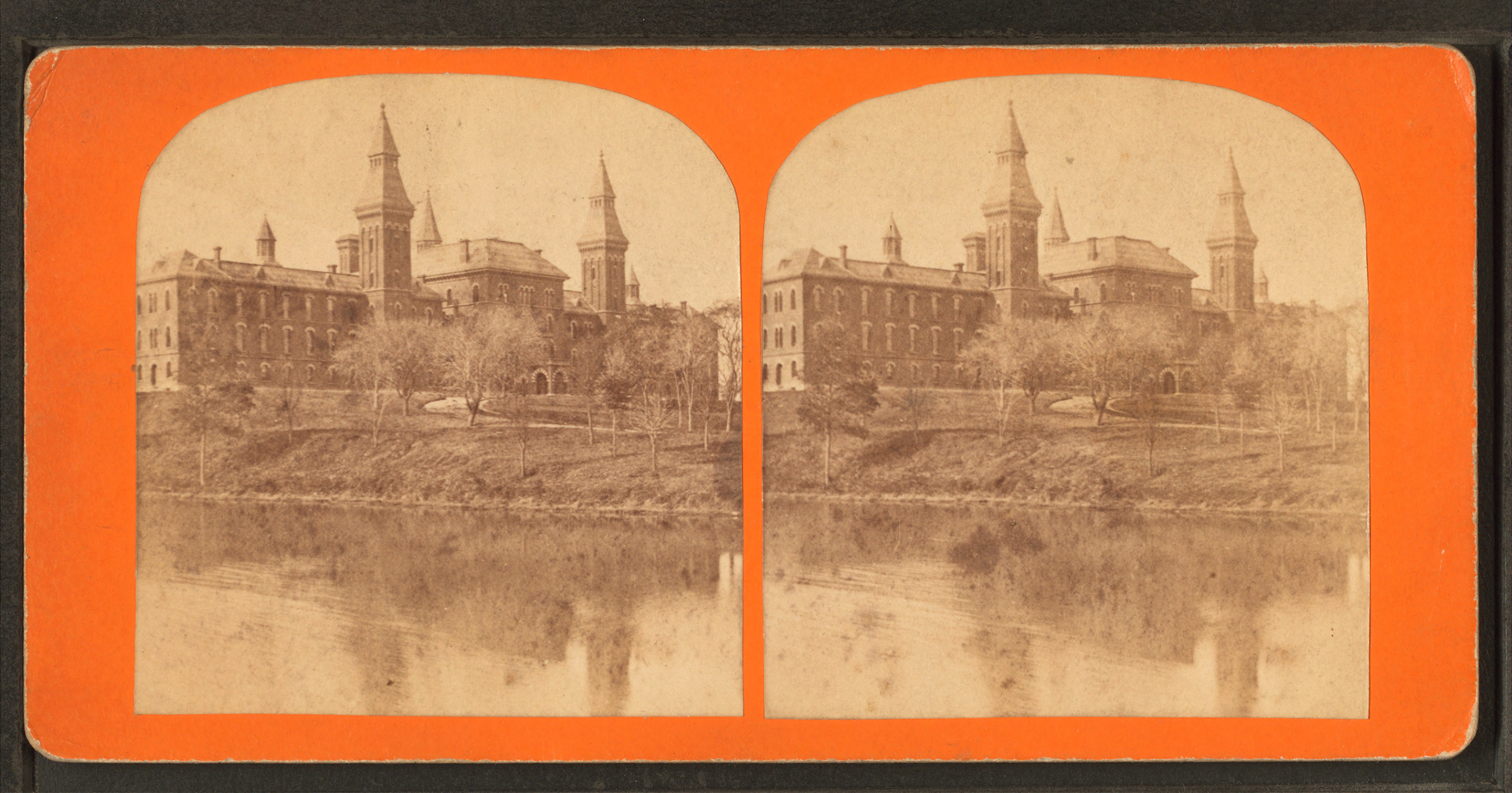
Rhode Island Hospital (former), Providence, Rhode Island, 1864-68.

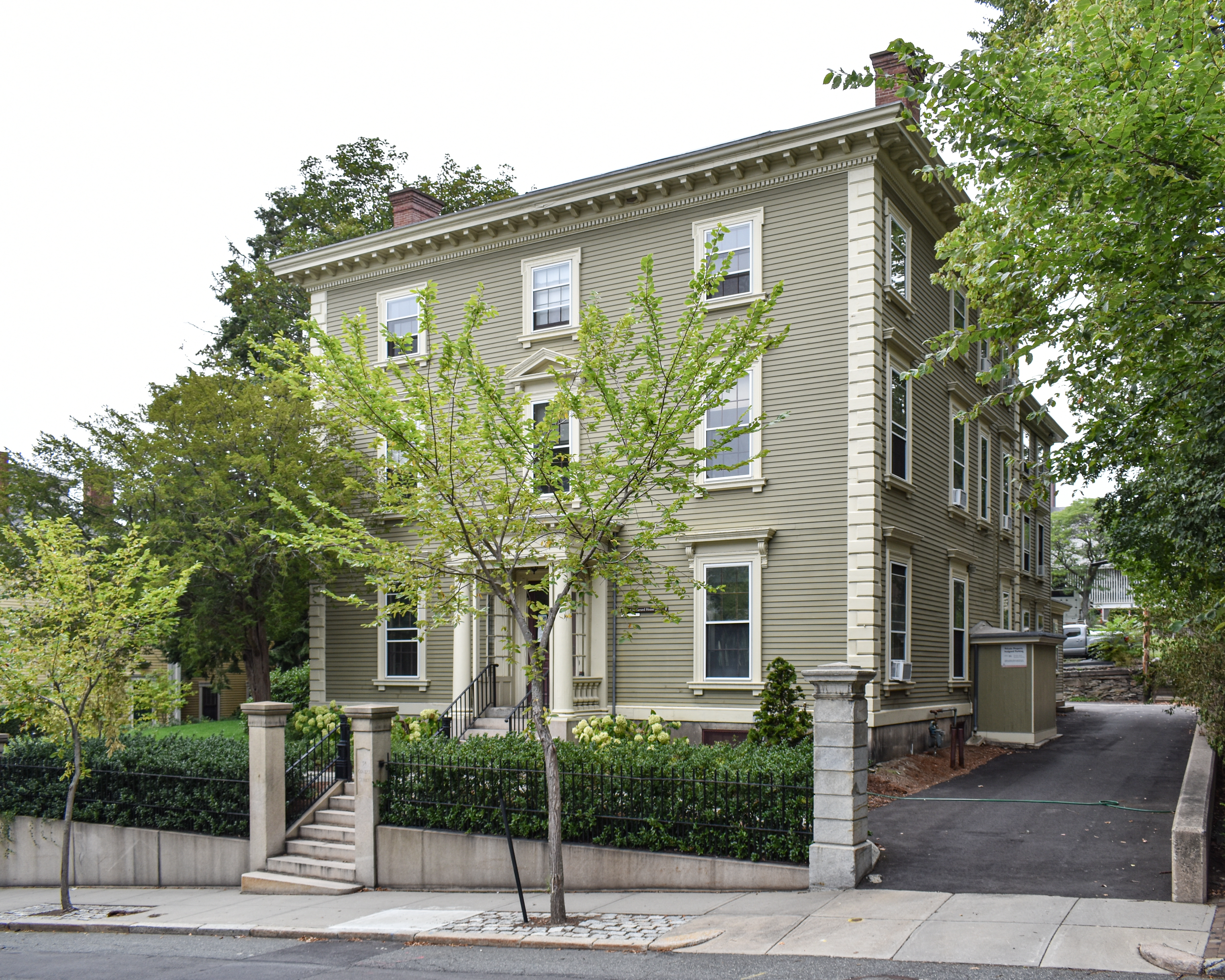
Remodeling of house for William Slater, Providence, Rhode Island, 1867.

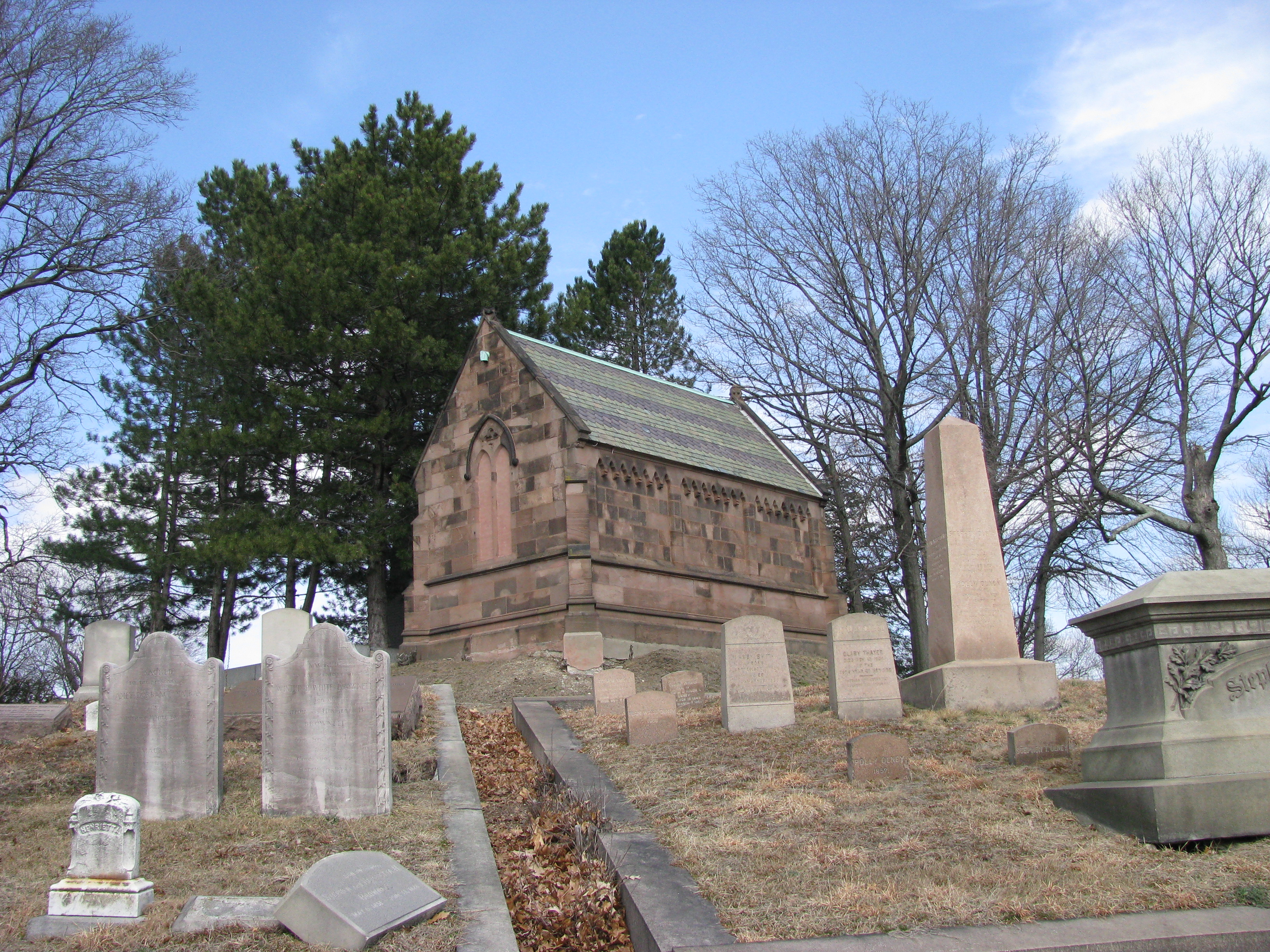
Brown Mausoleum, North Burial Ground, Providence, Rhode Island, 1869.

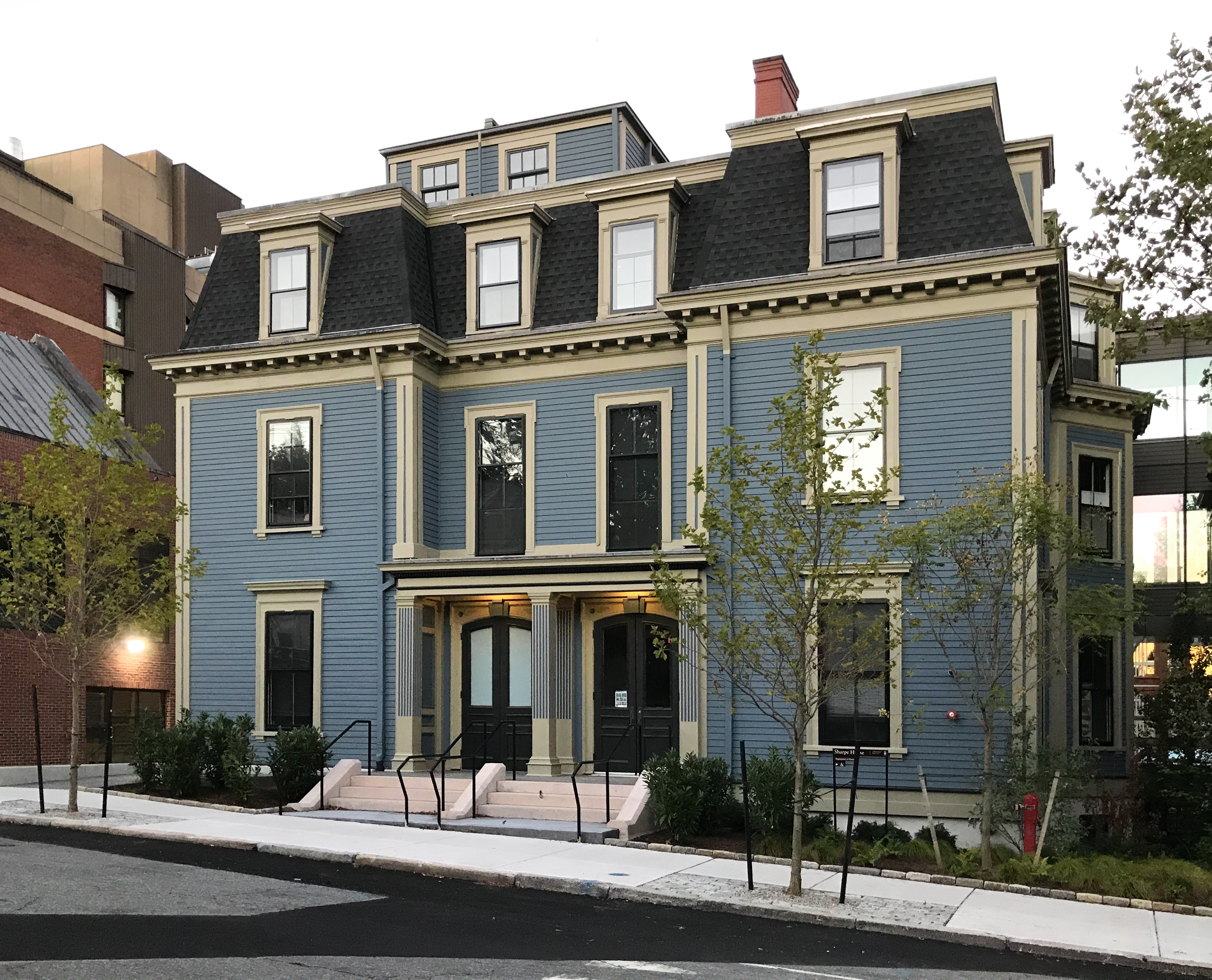
Double house for Lucian Sharpe, Providence, Rhode Island, 1874.

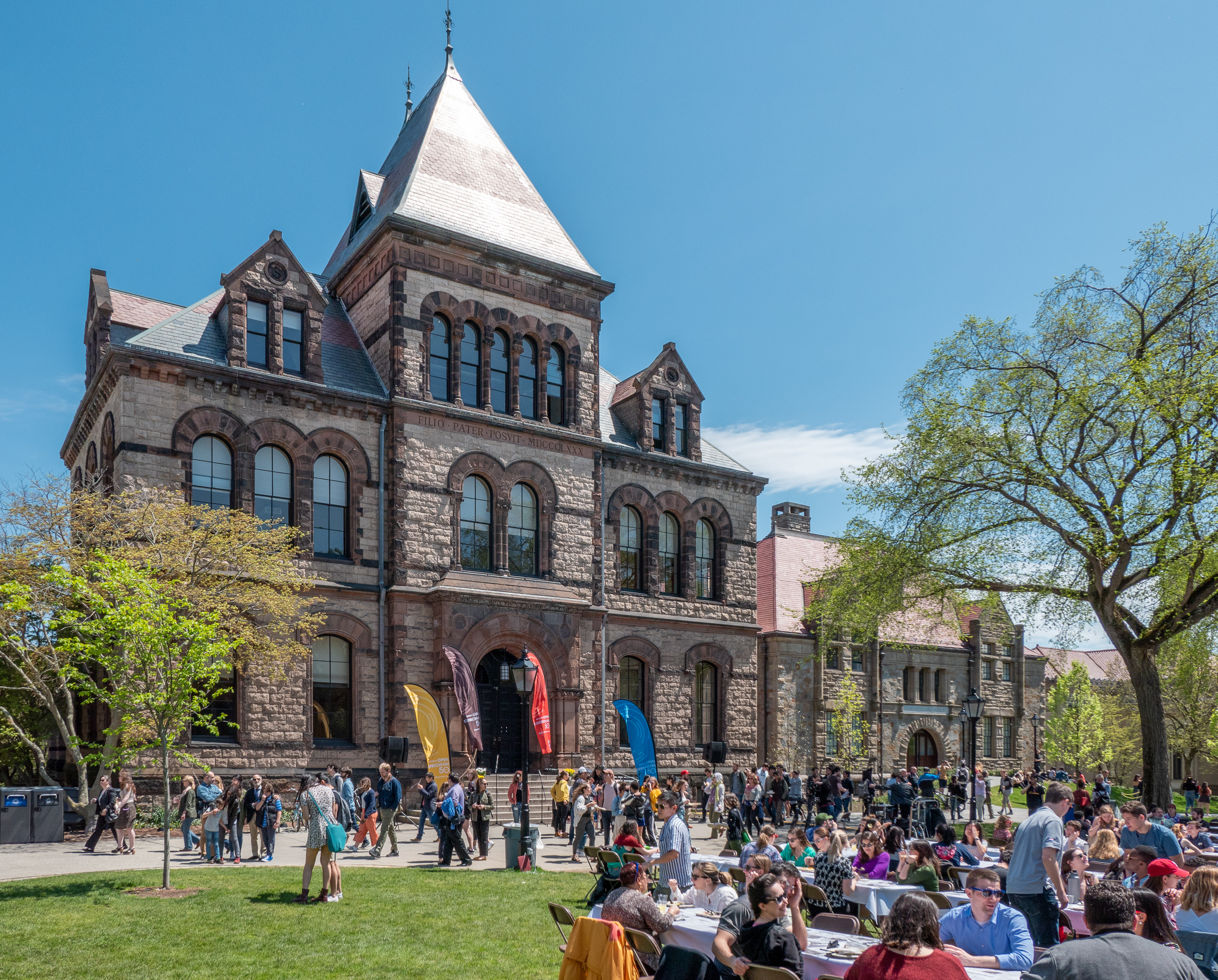
Sayles Memorial Hall, Brown University, Providence, Rhode Island, 1879–81.

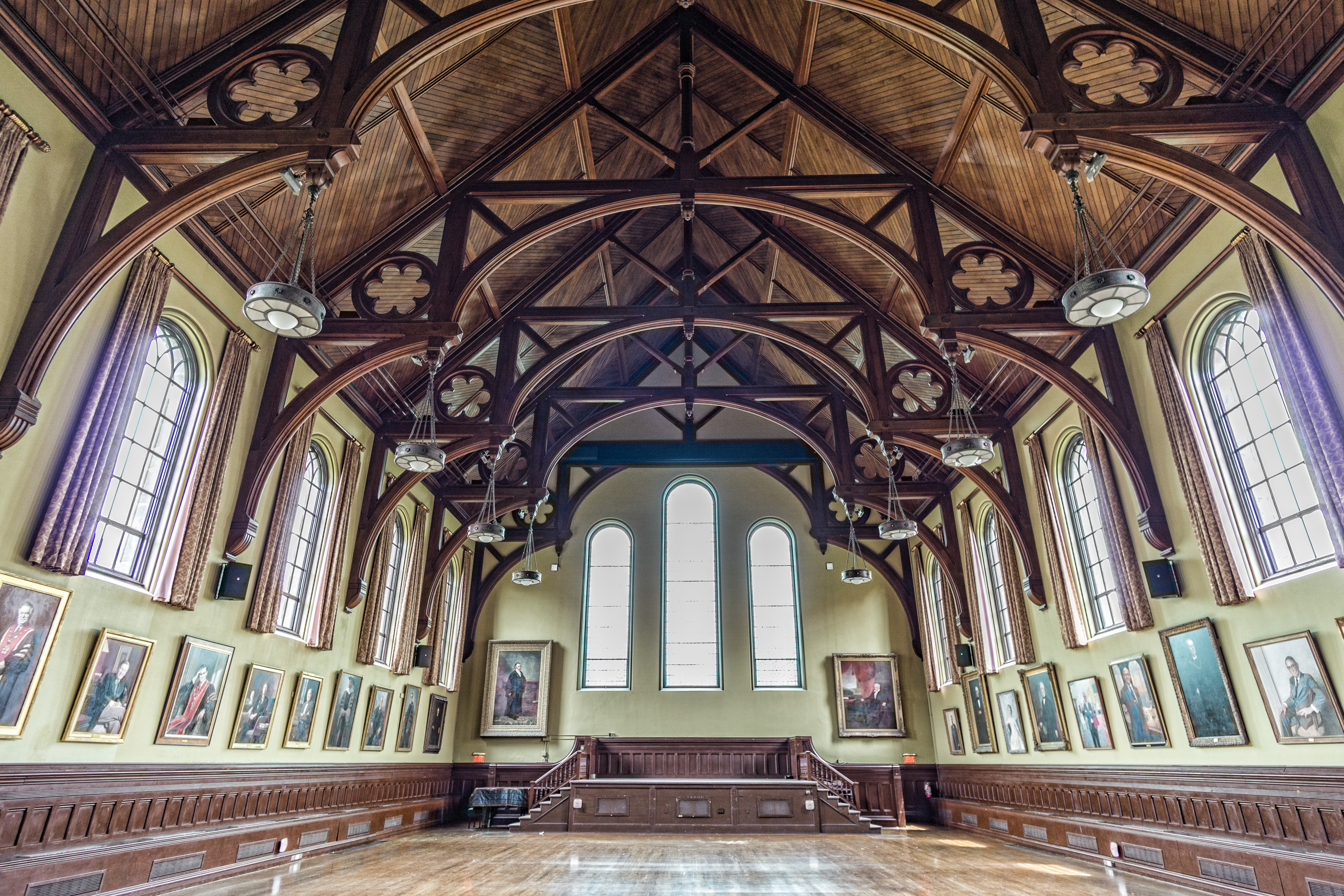
Interior of Sayles Memorial Hall, Brown University, Providence, Rhode Island, 1879–81.

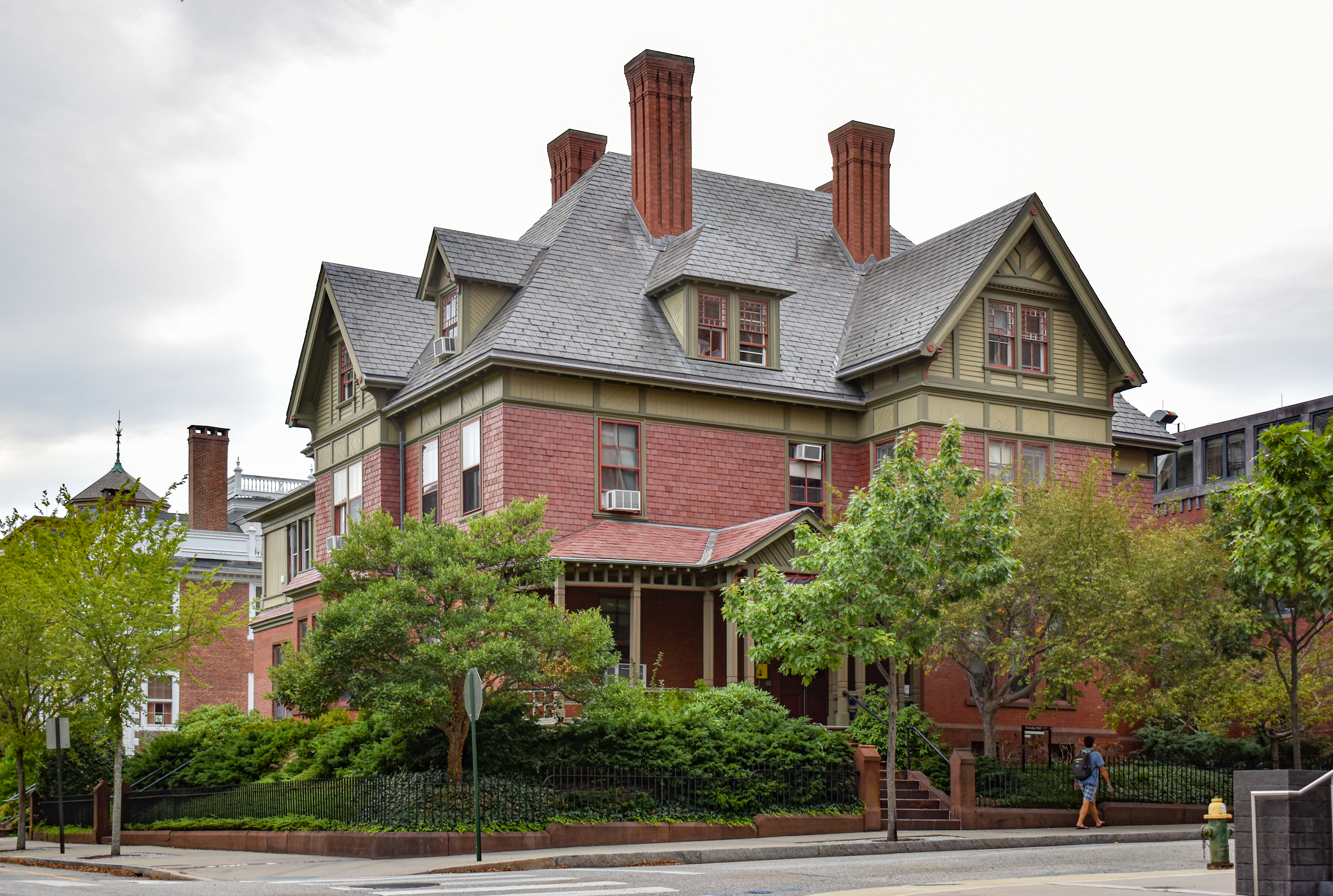
House for Henry Truman Beckwith, Providence, Rhode Island, 1883.

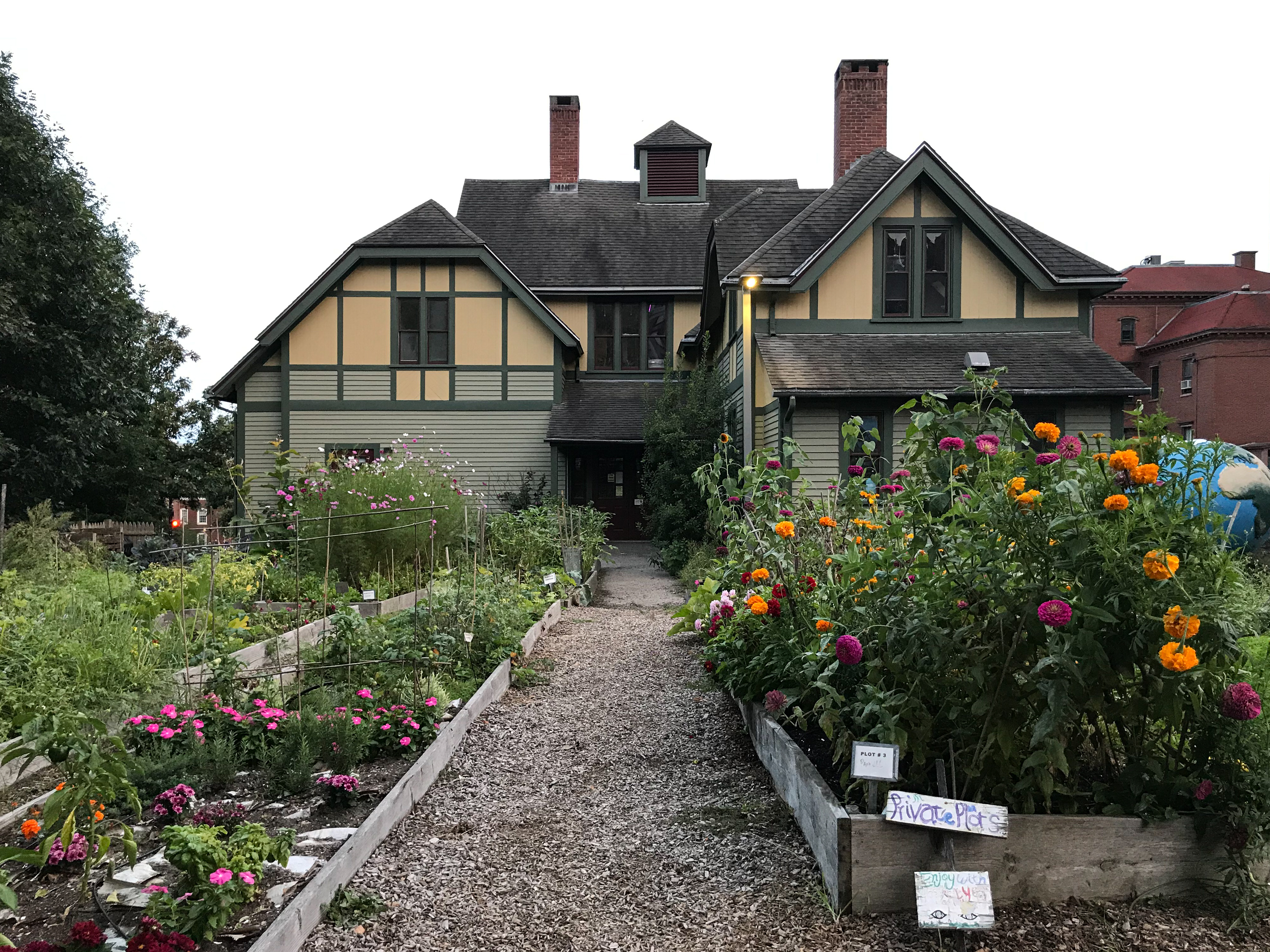
Carriage house and stable for Lucian Sharpe, Providence, Rhode Island, 1885.
