= Merchants Bank Building (Providence, Rhode Island) =

- U.S. National Register of Historic Places
- U.S. Historic district – Contributing property
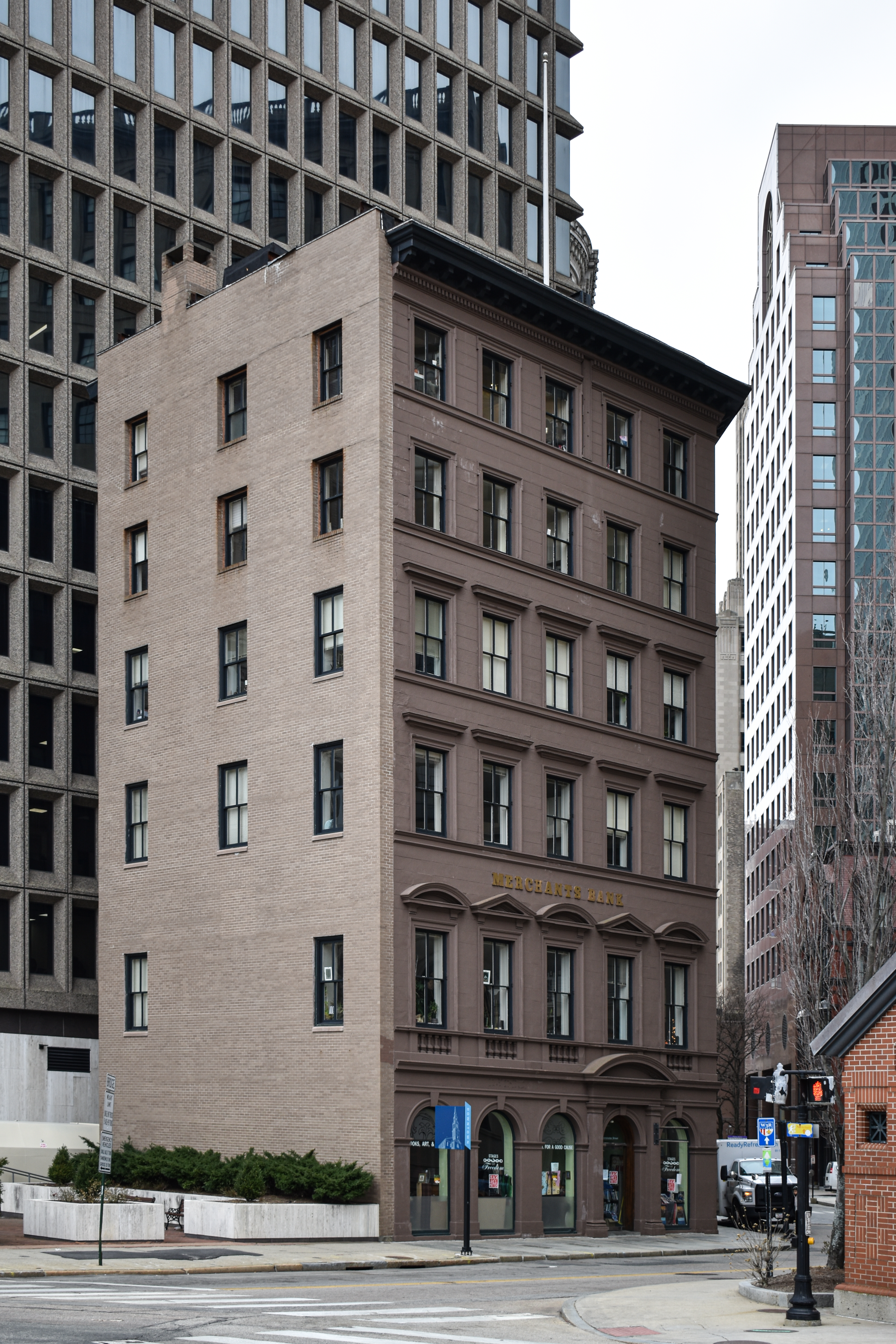

- Location within Rhode Island Location within the United States
- Location: Providence, Rhode Island
- Coordinates: 41°49′29″N 71°24′36″W
- Built: 1857; rebuilt 1891
- Architect: Morse & Hall (1857); Gould & Angell (1891)
- Architectural style: Italianate
- Part of: Downtown Providence Historic District (ID84001967)
- NRHP reference No.: 77000002

Significant dates
- Added to NRHP: November 21, 1977
- Designated CP: February 10, 1984

The Merchants Bank Building is a historic commercial building at 32 Westminster Street in downtown Providence, Rhode Island. It was originally completed in 1857 and rebuilt in 1891. It was home to the Merchants Bank until 1926, when it merged with the Providence National Bank, and was home of the combined bank until 1930.

== Description and history ==
It is a six-story brownstone structure, originally designed by Alpheus C. Morse and Clifton A. Hall and built in 1855–57. When built, this Italianate structure was one of the first buildings of Providence's financial district, and is now surrounded by much larger modern skyscrapers. It is architecturally reminiscent of Roman palazzos, with an arcaded ground floor, a second floor piano nobile with windows topped by alternating segmented arch and triangular pediments, and a projecting cornice with dentil moulding and modillions.

The bank remodeled its building in 1890–91. It was gutted to the floor joists and completely rebuilt. The bank's own offices were moved down from the second floor to street level, and the main entrance was relocated from the side facing Market Square to the southwest corner. The fifth floor was rebuilt to have rectangular windows in place of the original square ones, a matching sixth floor was added and the building was retrofitted to include an elevator. The architect for the remodeling was Gould & Angell and the contractor was Cutting & Bishop.

The Merchants Bank had been organized in February 1818 and was reorganized as a national bank in August 1865. Royal C. Taft, governor of Rhode Island in 1888–89, was president of the bank for forty years, from 1868 to 1908. His immediate successor was in office only a year and from 1909 his son, Robert W. Taft, was president. In May 1926 the Merchants National Bank merged with the Providence National Bank, the combined institution taking the name of the latter bank but moving into the building of the former. The Providence National Bank remained here until it completed its own building at 90 Westminster Street in February 1930.

The building was listed on the National Register of Historic Places in 1977.

== See also ==
- National Register of Historic Places listings in Providence, Rhode Island
