= Atlantic Mills =

Mill building in Providence, Rhode Island

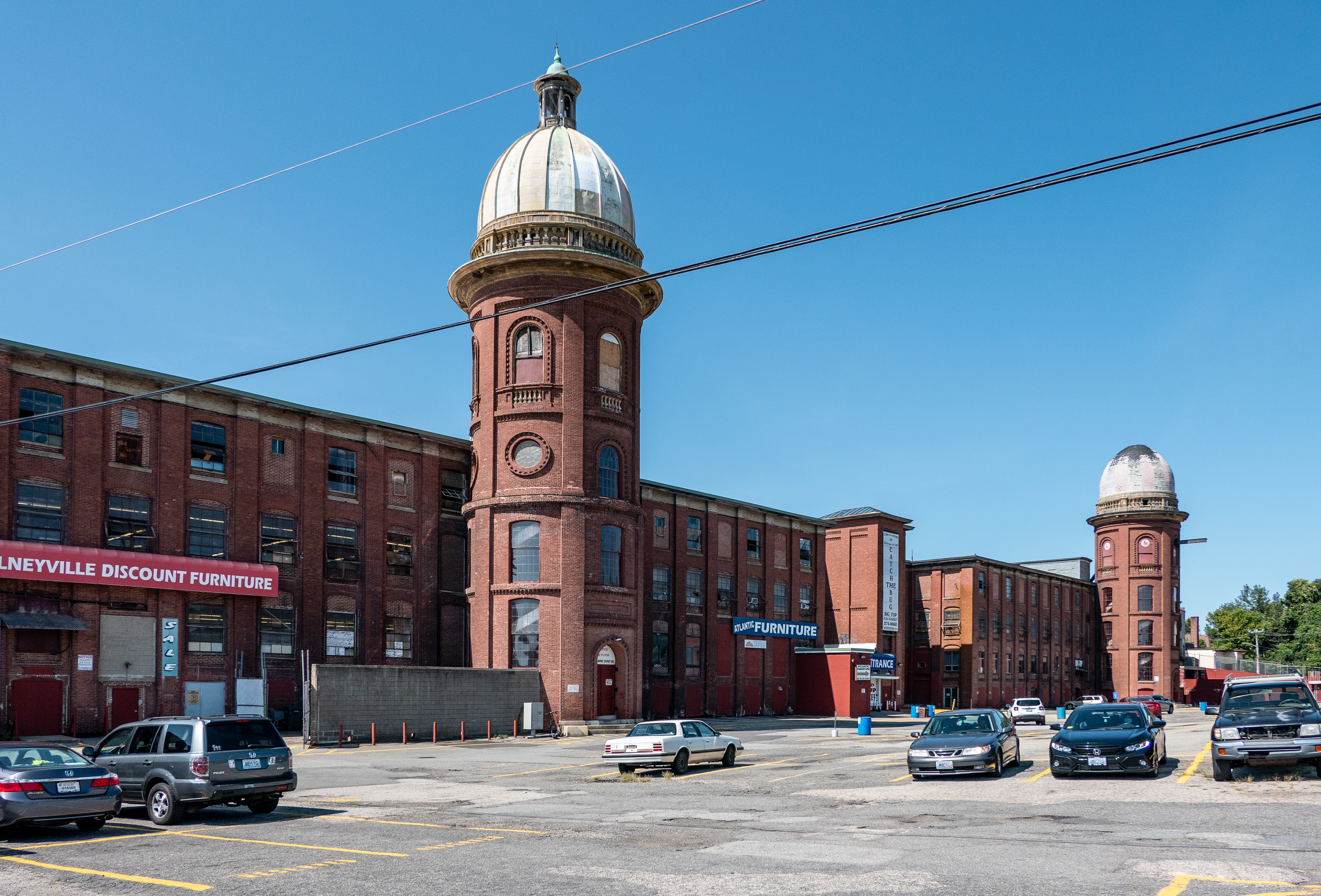
- Interactive map of the Atlantic Mills area

General information
- Location: Providence, Rhode Island, 118 Manton Avenue
- Coordinates: 41.8188°N 71.4470°W

Atlantic Mills, also known as the Atlantic Delaine Company Mill and the Atlantic Mills Complex, is a historic mill building with 330,000 square feet of leasable space located at 118 Manton Ave in the Olneyville neighborhood of Providence, Rhode Island. The building is located on the banks of the Woonasquatucket River. Tenants of the Atlantic Mills building include artist studios, small businesses, and second-hand stores.

== History ==
The Atlantic Mills complex was built in 1852 for the Atlantic Delaine Company, which manufactured delaine, a wool muslin. The Atlantic Delaine Company went bankrupt during the Panic of 1873. The Atlantic Delaine Company Mill buildings were sold at auction. Atlantic Mills, a new corporation, built new mills including the domed towers. At its peak, Atlantic Mills produced cotton-wrapped fabrics and employed more than 2,000 workers.

The Atlantic Mils were purchased by the A.D. Juilliard Company in 1904, and went out of business in 1953.

In the late 20th century and early 21st, Atlantic Mills was owned by Howard and Eleanor Brynes. In 2024, it was announced that Robert Berle and Eric Edelman planned to purchase the building. In response to the potential change in ownership, the tenants of Atlantic Mills created a commercial union. The artists tenants of the building are concerned they will be displaced if the building is developed. As of 2024, Atlantic Mills is one of the few artists lofts remaining in Providence.
