= National Register of Historic Places listings in Central Falls, Rhode Island =

This is a list of Registered Historic Places in Central Falls, Rhode Island.

Contents: Counties in Rhode Island

Bristol | Kent | Newport | Providence (Pawtucket | Providence (city) | Woonsocket) | Washington

This National Park Service list is complete through NPS recent listings posted April 17, 2026.

	Name on the Register	Image	Date listed	Location	City or town	Description
1	Central Falls Congregational Church	Central Falls Congregational Church	July 12, 1976 (#76000042)	376 High St. 41°53′05″N 71°23′04″W	Central Falls	
2	Central Falls Mill Historic District	Central Falls Mill Historic District	July 2, 1976 (#76000007)	Between Roosevelt Avenue and the Blackstone River; 41°53′11″N 71°22′55″W	Central Falls	
3	Central Street School	Central Street School	April 6, 1979 (#79000004)	379 Central St. 41°53′04″N 71°23′38″W	Central Falls	
4	Samuel B. Conant House	Samuel B. Conant House	April 6, 1979 (#79000005)	104 Clay St. 41°52′59″N 71°23′25″W	Central Falls	
5	Conant Thread-Coats & Clark Mill Complex District	Conant Thread-Coats & Clark Mill Complex District	November 18, 1983 (#83003809)	Roughly bounded by Lonsdale Avenue, Rand and Pine Streets. 41°52′51″N 71°23′53″W	Central Falls	Extends into Pawtucket
6	David G. Fales House	David G. Fales House	April 6, 1979 (#79000006)	476 High St. 41°53′10″N 71°23′05″W	Central Falls	
7	Benjamin F. Greene House	Benjamin F. Greene House	April 6, 1979 (#79000007)	85 Cross St. 41°53′08″N 71°23′11″W	Central Falls	
8	Holy Trinity Church Complex	Holy Trinity Church Complex	January 3, 1978 (#78000073)	134 Fuller Ave. 41°53′19″N 71°23′47″W	Central Falls	Church demolished; only the parish house is extant.
9	Jenks Park & Cogswell Tower	Jenks Park & Cogswell Tower	April 6, 1979 (#79000057)	Adjoining 580 Broad St. 41°53′15″N 71°23′21″W	Central Falls	
10	St. Matthew's Church	St. Matthew's Church	April 6, 1979 (#79000008)	Dexter and W. Hunt Sts. 41°53′21″N 71°24′07″W	Central Falls	
11	South Central Falls Historic District	South Central Falls Historic District	January 31, 1991 (#91000025)	Roughly bounded by the Central Falls-Pawtucket boundary and Rand, Summit, Dexter and Broad Sts. 41°53′04″N 71°23′28″W	Central Falls	
12	Valley Falls Mill	Valley Falls Mill	April 26, 1978 (#78000012)	1359 and 1361-63 Broad St. 41°53′55″N 71°23′20″W	Central Falls	Boundary increase December 18, 1978.

== See also ==
- National Register of Historic Places listings in Providence County, Rhode Island
- List of National Historic Landmarks in Rhode Island
