= Albert H. Humes =

American architect (1867 - 1947)

Mayor of Central Falls, RI
- In office 1903–1904

Personal details
- Born: 1867
- Died: 1947 (aged 79–80)
- Resting place: Moshassuck Cemetery, Central Falls
- Education: Scholfield's Commercial College
- Occupation: architect

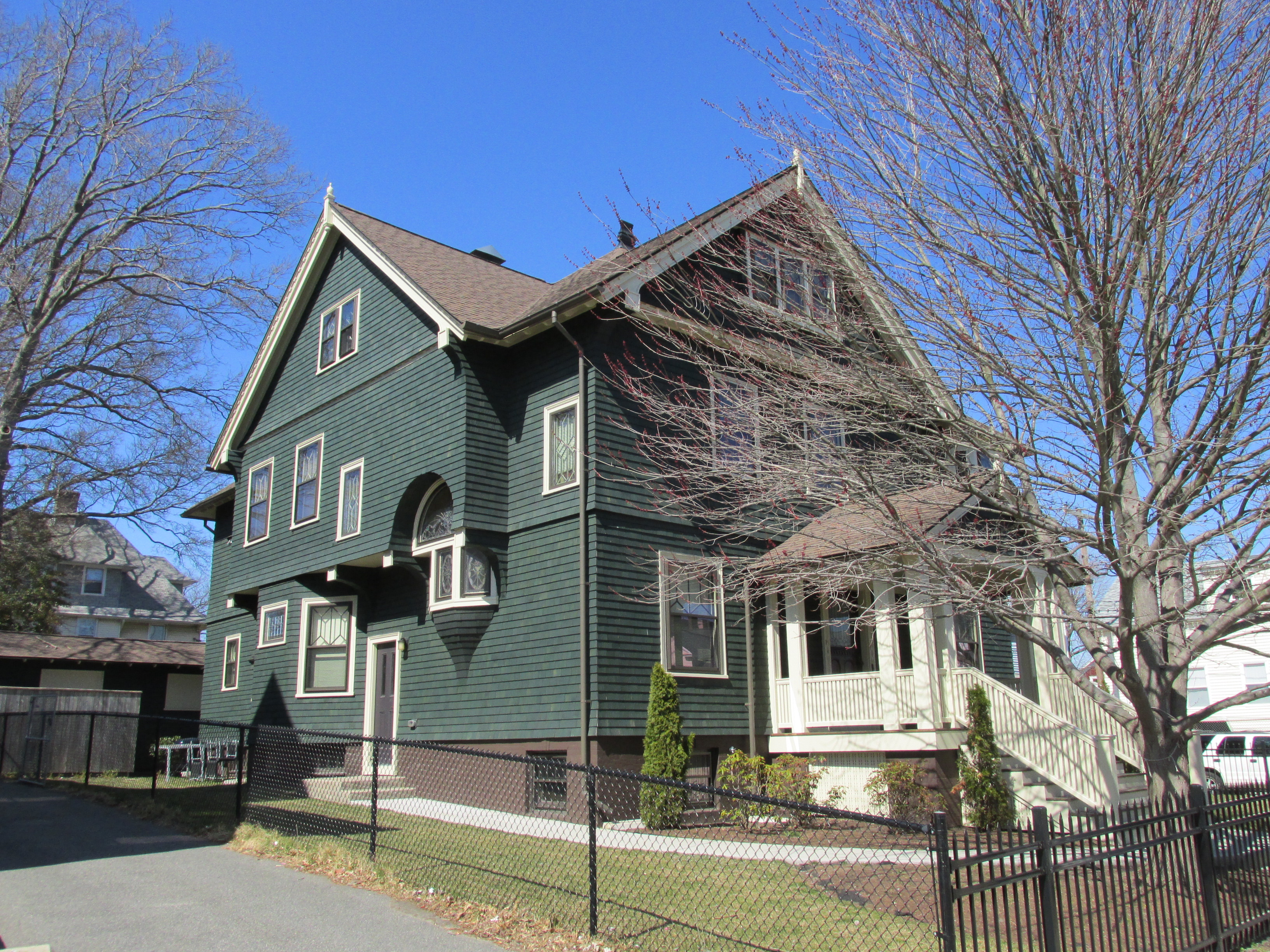
Eugene A. Burnham House, Pawtucket, RI. 1902.

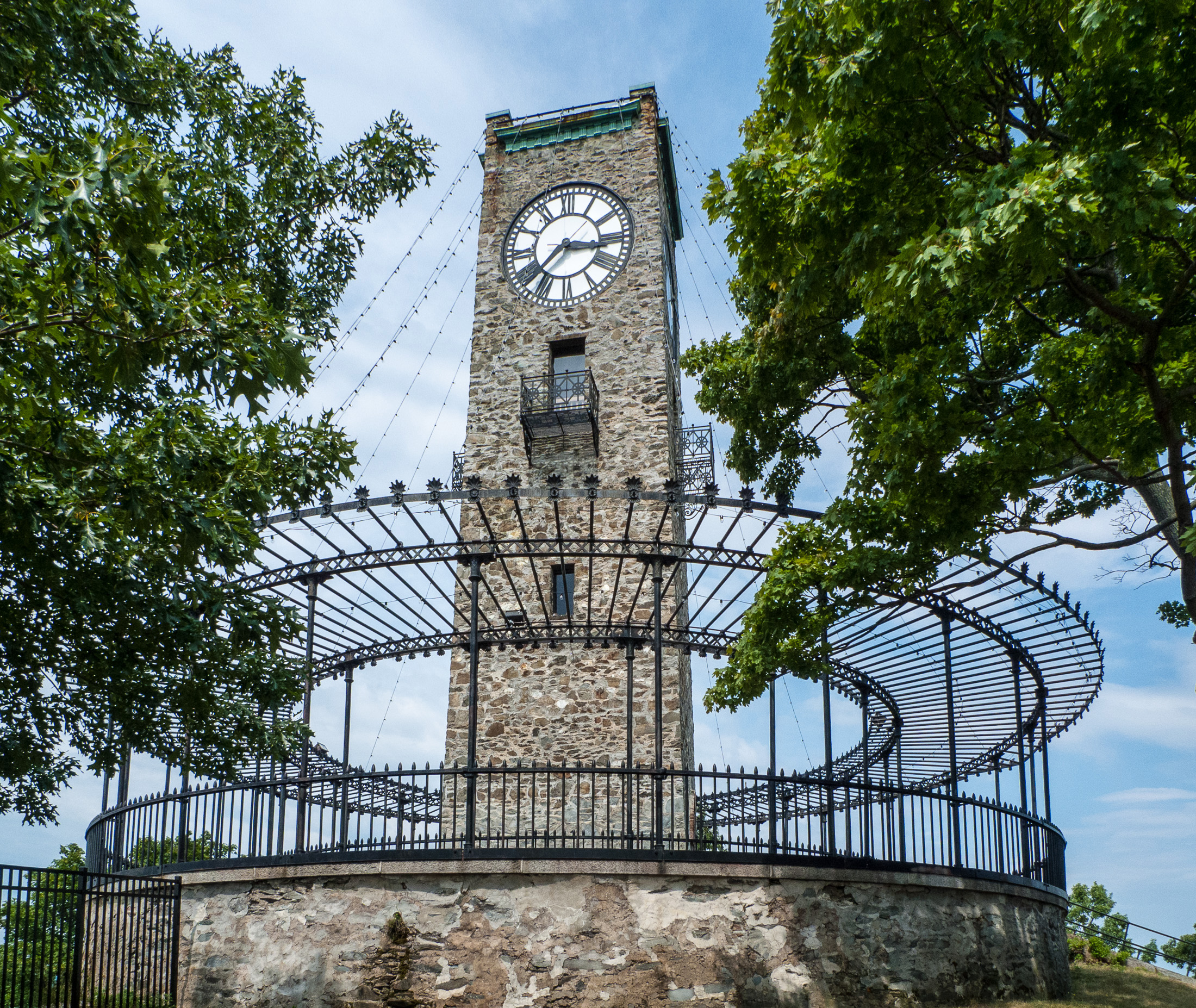
Cogswell Tower, Jenks Park, Central Falls, RI. 1904.

Albert Hadfield Humes (1867–1947) was an American architect working in Central Falls and Pawtucket, Rhode Island. He was known locally as a designer of private residences and schools.

He attended Scholfield's Commercial College in Providence, and worked for noted architects William R. Walker & Son for 6 years. He opened his office in Central Falls in 1887. In 1895, he moved it to the larger, neighboring city of Pawtucket. Between 1903 and 1904, Humes served as the mayor of Central Falls. Upon his death, Humes was buried in Moshassuck Cemetery in Central Falls.

Humes continued to practice at least through the early 1940s, but little is known of his work after 1910.

== Architectural works ==
- James E. Childs House, 19 Stuart St., Pawtucket, RI (1888)
- Broad Street Fire Station, 551 Broad St., Central Falls, RI (1889)
- Kendall Street Fire Station, 14-16 Kendall St., Central Falls, RI (1891) - Demolished.
- Benjamin F. G. Linnell House, 79 Summit St., Central Falls, RI (1892) - This house has recently been stripped of its Queen Anne ornament.
- Lester I. Mathewson House, 212 Cottage St., Pawtucket, RI (1892)
- Walter Stearns House, 22 Walnut St., Pawtucket, RI (1892)
- Garfield Street School, 150 Illinois St., Central Falls, RI (1892) - Demolished.
- Alanson P. Wood House, 153 Center St., Central Falls, RI (1894)
- Patrick F. McCarthy Duplex, 28-30 Jefferson Ave., Pawtucket, RI (1894)
- George T. Greenhalgh Duplex, 23-25 Daniels St., Pawtucket, RI (1895)
- Lucius B. Darling, Jr. House, 124 Walcott St., Pawtucket, RI (1895)
- Cherry Street Kindergarten, 23 Cherry St., Pawtucket, RI (1896) - Burned 1960s.
- Herbert S. Jenks House, 1042 Newport Ave., Pawtucket, RI (1897)
- Odd Fellows Building, 17 Bank St., Attleboro, MA (1897) - All but the ground floor was destroyed in a 1918 fire.
- Broadway School, 481 Broadway, Pawtucket, RI (1899) - Demolished.
- Willard B. Tanner House, 101 Blackstone Blvd., Providence, RI (1901)
- Apponaug School, 3445 Post Rd., Apponaug, RI (1902) - This building, later the Warwick High School, burned in 1927.
- Eugene A. Burnham House, 17 Nickerson St., Pawtucket, RI (1902)
- Joyce Street School, 1 Joyce St., Warren, RI (1902)
- Cogswell Tower, Jenks Park, Central Falls, RI (1904)
- Episcopal Church of the Good Shepherd Parish House, 490 Broadway, Pawtucket, RI (1904–05) - Highly altered.
- Fire Station No. 2, 420 Main St., Pawtucket, RI (1905) - Now the Pawtucket Senior Center.
- Albert H. Humes House, 15 Arlington St., Pawtucket, RI (1906) - Humes' own residence.
- Oak Hall Building, 310 Main St., Pawtucket, RI (1906) - Demolished 1975.
- Albert E. Seal House, 96 Clyde St., Pawtucket, RI (1907)
- Standard Nut and Bolt Co. Factory, 51 Abbott St., Valley Falls, RI (1907 et al.) - Humes was the treasurer and an organizer of this company.
- To Kalon Club, 26 Main St., Pawtucket, RI (1908) - Now occupied by offices.
- Gately Building, 335 Main St., Pawtucket, RI (1914)
- Cyrus Taft House, 116 Dexter St., Lonsdale, RI (1914)

Party political offices
| Preceded by New political party | Progressive nominee for governor of Rhode Island; 1912 | Succeeded by F. D. Thompson |
