= Tuxpan Taqueria =

Restaurant in Cedar Falls, Rhode Island, U.S.

- Interactive map of Tuxpan Taqueria

Restaurant information
- Food type: Mexican
- Location: 355 Broad Street, Central Falls, Rhode Island, 02863, United States
- Coordinates: 41°53′03″N 71°23′12″W

Tuxpan Taqueria is a Mexican restaurant in Central Falls, Rhode Island, United States. It was a semifinalist in the Best New Restaurant category of the James Beard Foundation Awards in 2024.

== See also ==
- List of Mexican restaurants
