= E.A. Burnham House =

Historic house in Rhode Island, US

- U.S. National Register of Historic Places
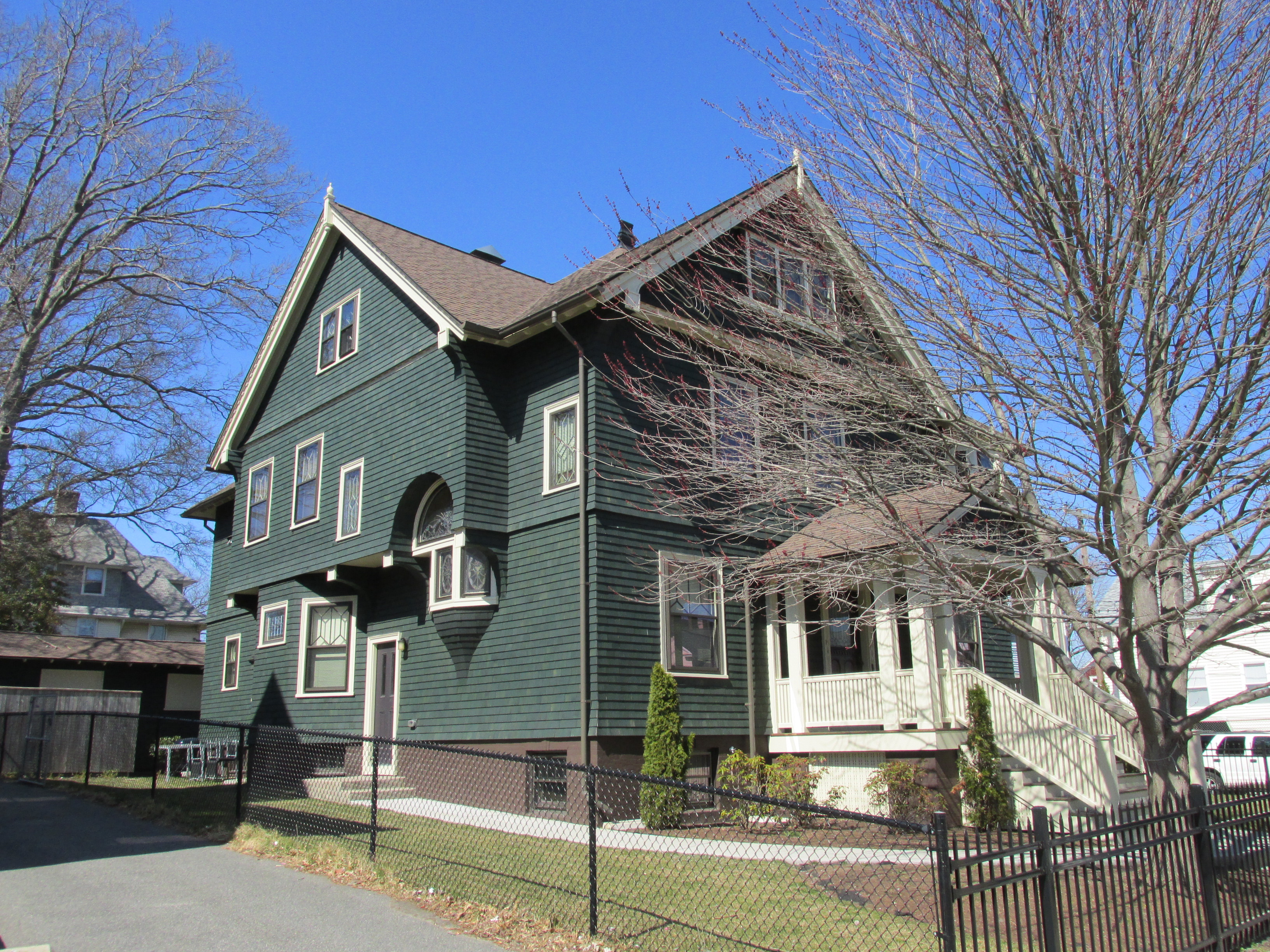
- E.A. Burnham House

- Location within Rhode Island Location within the United States
- Location: Pawtucket, Rhode Island
- Coordinates: 41.88285°N 71.38825°W
- Built: 1902
- Architect: Albert H. Humes
- MPS: Pawtucket MRA
- NRHP reference No.: 83003806
- Added to NRHP: November 18, 1983

The E. A. Burnham House is an historic house at 17 Nickerson Street in Pawtucket, Rhode Island. It is a 2 1/2-story wood-frame structure, with a cross-gabled hip roof plan. Its exterior is finished in wood shingles, with decorative Gothic Revival bargeboard, finials, and other elements. The building's interior contains elaborately carved woodwork, most of which has survived conversion of the building to multiple units. The house was built in 1902 for Eugene Burnham, a local businessman, and is one of the few known designs of local architect Albert H. Humes. The property's garage, which is stylistically similar to the house, may be one of the oldest in the city.

The house was listed on the National Register of Historic Places in 1983, where it is listed as "G.A. Burnham House".

== See also ==
- National Register of Historic Places listings in Pawtucket, Rhode Island
