= Glyn O'Malley =

American playwright (1951–2006)

Glyn William O'Malley (October 10, 1951 – November 14, 2006) was an American playwright.

Glyn O'Malley was born in Providence and grew up in Central Falls, Rhode Island. His initial involvement with theatre was with the R. I. Governor's School for the Gifted in the Arts, a summer program for high school students. This led to programs of study at Trinity Square Repertory in Providence. He went on to a degree from the School of Drama at the North Carolina School of the Arts.

His initial interest in acting was soon superseded by his strong talent for direction and writing. Author of nineteen plays, his most recent New York premieres were part of his "war cycle":

- Paradise (Kirk Theatre, 2005)
- A Heartbeat to Baghdad (The Flea, 2004)
- Concertina's Rainbow (Cherry Lane Alternative, 2001)

His plays have been seen in New York at various theatres including Playwright's Horizons, Lincoln Center, The WPA Theatre and the Rattlestick.

He directed over fifty productions in major theatres around the United States and Europe, including the world premiere of Albee's Men and Albee's Women. He was Associate Producer for the English Speaking Theatre of Vienna for 12 years and the former Literary Director for the Edward Albee Foundation.

He was a Guest Artist or Visiting Professor at a wide range of institutions nationwide, including: Harvard University, Austin Peay State University, Sarah Lawrence College, North Carolina School of the Arts, The American Academy of Dramatic Arts, The Juilliard School among others. He was in residence at The Moscow Art Theatre where he wrote a documentary film—The Flight of The Seagull—about Chekhov and Stanislavski and has lectured at The Czech Theatre Institute.

O'Malley was a Member of The Dramatist Guild of America, and The Freedom-to-Write Committee, PEN American. He and his work have been written about extensively by such publications as The New York Times, American Theatre, the Los Angeles Times, The Washington Weekly Standard, and Cincinnati Magazine—which called him 'the most talked to and talked about playwright in 2003'. He was featured on National Public Radio many times, as well as on national television shows like The O'Reilly Factor and others. He was nominated for PEN American's 2004 'Newman's Own First Amendment Award' for Paradise, and honored for this at a Master's Tea by Yale University.
