= Leon Stanislaw Jablecki =

US rocket scientist

Leon Stanislaw Jablecki (June 26, 1916 – 17 March 1990) was an American rocket scientist.

== Early life ==
He was born June 26, 1916, in Central Falls, Rhode Island, as the last son of a Polish immigrant. His parents died while he was very young so he was raised by his older brother Kasmir. Leon Jablecki graduated from Central Falls High School in 1934 then graduated from University of Rhode Island in 1938 with a degree in civil engineering. He worked with various state public works departments as a highway bridge designer. In 1939 he joined the US Army as an officer to become an aircraft pilot. He did not complete the flight training program and elected to leave the service. He then attended Stanford University earning master's degrees in mathematics and aeronautical engineering.

== World War II ==
During World War II, he returned to the Army as an Aircraft Maintenance Officer. He was assigned to the Pacific Theater with the 22nd Bomb Group. His unit, initially based at Muroc, California, deployed in 1942 to Ipswich, Australia. From there they self-deployed their B-26 Marauders to Dobodura, New Guinea, where they remained until the Japanese surrender. Jablecki entered service with the Army as a second lieutenant and after just four years rose to the rank of major.

== Post War ==
After the war, Jablecki was assigned to duty at Wright Field in Dayton, Ohio. His initial assignment was Director of the Airborne Laboratory for the U. S. Air Material Command's “Around the World” Tropical Mission. He and the team conducted numerous experiments and tests on various military equipment under harsh environmental and deployment conditions. Upon his return to Wright Field, he was assigned as a member of the Project Blue Book. In 1947 the United States Air Force was established. He was given the opportunity to become an Air Force Officer or remain with the Army. He chose to change military service to the Air Force. In 1949 he was selected to attend the University of Zurich for a Doctorate Degree in Aerospace Engineering.

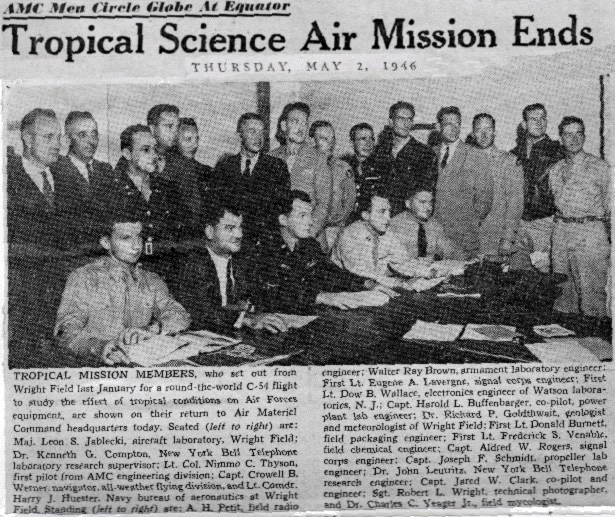
Leon.Tropical.Science

== In the Air Force ==
In the late 1940s, the United States was extremely interested in cultivating a strong cast of rocket scientist. The U.S. Air Force selected Jablecki to attain a doctorate degree in aerospace engineering. At the time, the University of Zurich (ETH Zurich) was the premier institution of higher learning in the field. Perhaps because Albert Einstein received his PhD there and, for a time, Wernher von Braun attended the Institute. Jablecki received his PhD in aerospace engineering in 1954 and traveled back to the Maryland. Dr. Jablecki had been assigned to lecture at Annapolis on the potential of Submarine-launched ballistic missiles. After a short assignment at Annapolis, he was reassigned to the Redstone Arsenal in Alabama where he worked with the von Braun team on the development of the Saturn V. As the project developed, Dr. Jablecki was again reassigned, because of his expertise in dynamic air flow, to the Arnold Engineering Development Complex in Tennessee. There, he conducted crucial testing on the Saturn V design using the vast wind tunnel systems at Arnold. It was through this research, and subsequent design modification, that the Saturn V became such an extraordinary rocket. From 1962 to the 1980s the Saturn V (C-5) was not only the primary NASA platform, it was the sole booster platform used by NASA.

== USAF ballistic systems ==
From Arnold Center, now Colonel Jablecki was reassigned to Norton Air Force Base in California. There he headed the U.S. Air Forces’ Ballistic Missile Office, later renamed the Ballistic Systems Division. Colonel Jablecki replaced Brigadier General Bernard A. Schriever as the Director. Projects developed during his tenure include Atlas, Titan, and Minuteman I missiles. His final project at the Ballistic Missile Office was the initiation of the multiple reentry vehicle (MRV) concept.

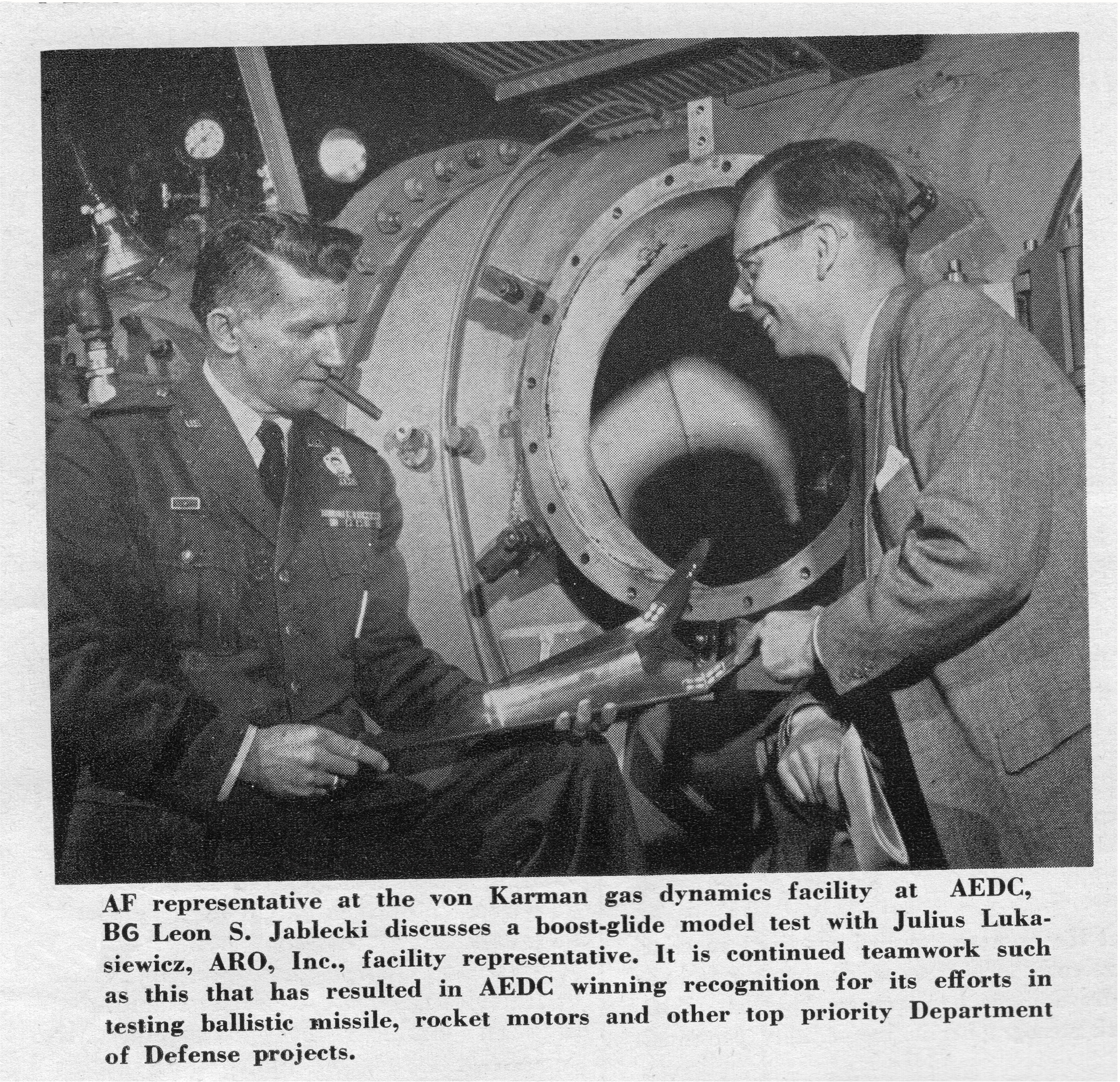

He retired from the Air Force after twenty-eight years of service then entered Civil Service with the U.S. Army at the Army Aviation Center. He was assigned to the Combat Developments Division and headed the research project for Rotor-craft vulnerability under combat conditions. Dr. Jablecki and his team identified the five (5) key combat vulnerabilities associated with the helicopter under combat conditions using data accumulated during the Vietnam War.

== Family ==
His brother Zygmond Jablecki was an animator with Hanna-Barbera Productions.
