= 1912 Rhode Island gubernatorial election =

- November 5, 1912
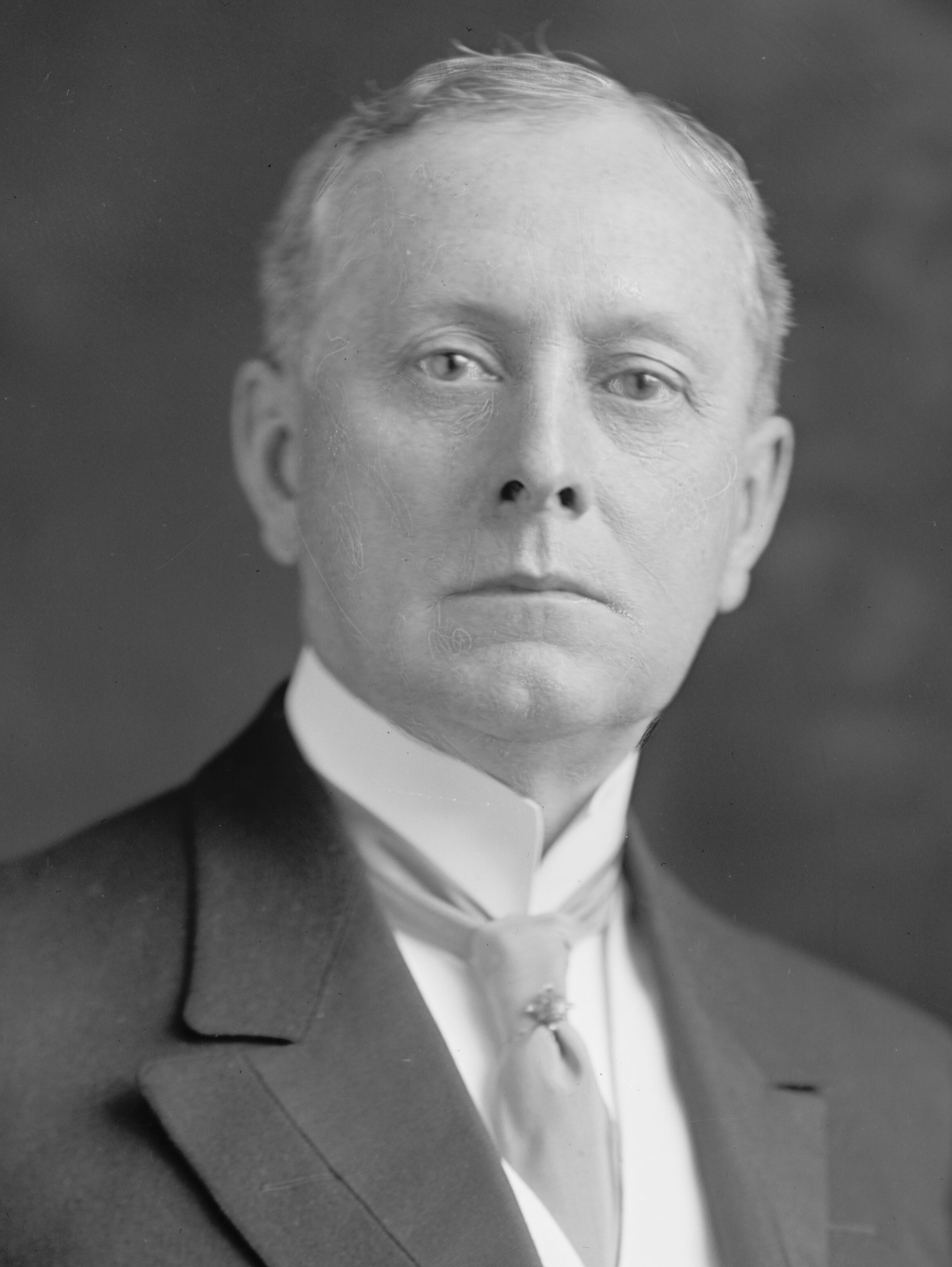

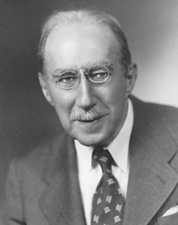

Nominee	Aram J. Pothier	Theodore F. Green	Albert H. Humes
Party	Republican	Democratic	Progressive
Popular vote	34,133	32,725	8,457
Percentage	43.67%	41.87%	10.82%
- Pothier: 40–50% 50–60% 60–70% 80–90% Green: 40–50%
Governor before election
Aram J. Pothier
Republican
Elected Governor
Aram J. Pothier
Republican

The 1912 Rhode Island gubernatorial election was held on November 5, 1912. Incumbent Republican Aram J. Pothier defeated Democratic nominee Theodore F. Green with 43.67% of the vote.

== General election ==
=== Candidates ===
Major party candidates

- Aram J. Pothier, Republican
- Theodore F. Green, Democratic

Other candidates

- Albert H. Humes, Progressive
- Samuel H. Fassel, Socialist
- Willis H. White, Prohibition
- Thomas F. Herrick, Socialist Labor

=== Results ===
1912 Rhode Island gubernatorial election
Party	Candidate	Votes	%	±%
Republican	Aram J. Pothier (incumbent)	34,133	43.67%	
Democratic	Theodore F. Green	32,725	41.87%	
Progressive	Albert H. Humes	8,457	10.82%	
Socialist	Samuel H. Fassel	1,913	2.45%	
Prohibition	Willis H. White	687	0.88%	
Socialist Labor	Thomas F. Herrick	251	0.32%	
Majority		1,408		
Turnout				
Republican hold		Swing		
