= Carl Russell Fish =

American historian (1876–1932)

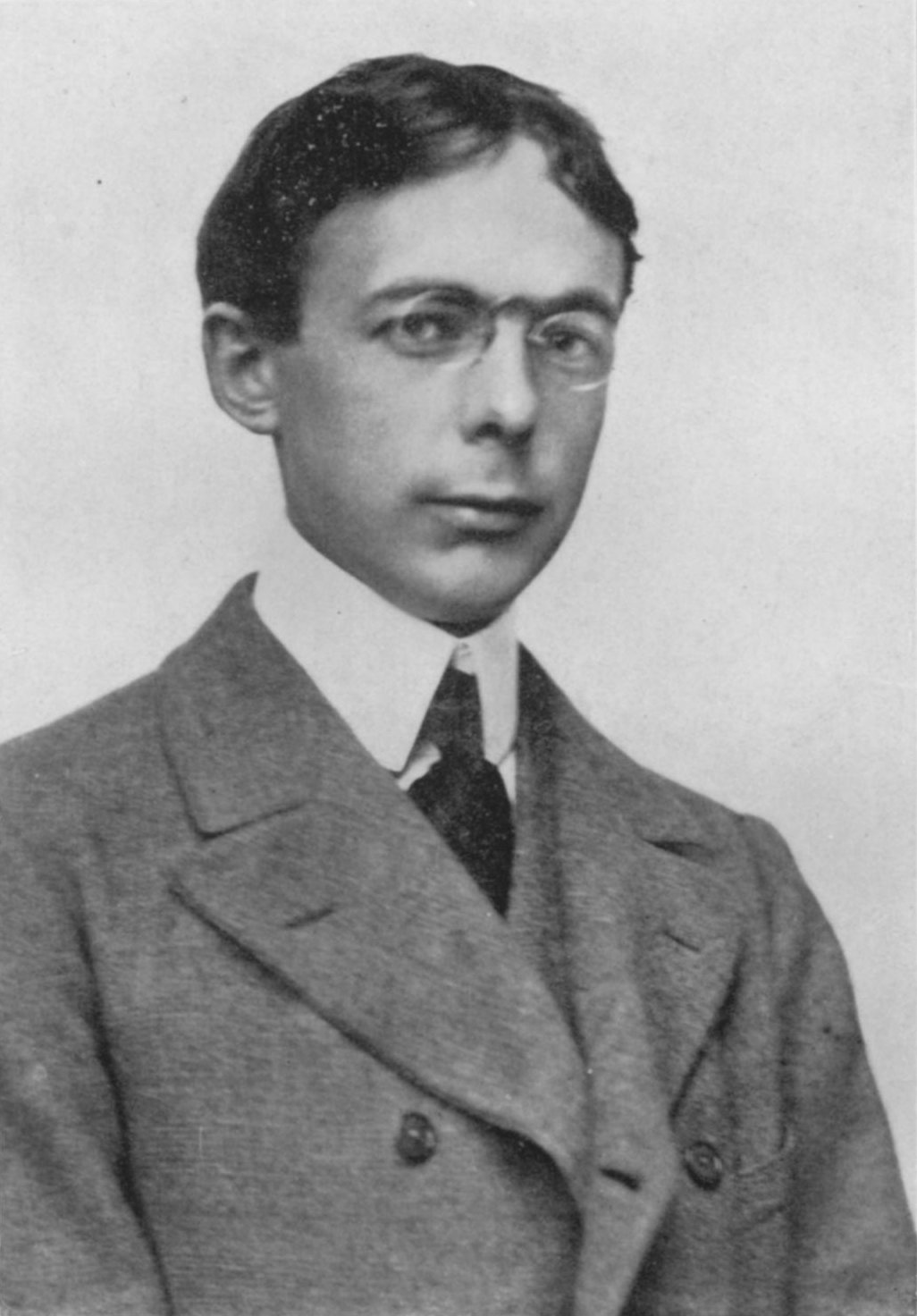
- Carl Russell Fish circa 1917
- Born: October 17, 1876; Central Falls, Rhode Island, U.S.
- Died: July 10, 1932 (aged 55); Madison, Wisconsin, U.S.
- Education: Brown University (BA) Harvard University (MA, PhD)
- Occupations: Historian, Professor
- Known for: Professor of History at University of Wisconsin–Madison
- Spouse: Jeanne l'Hommedieu (m. 1919)
- Honours: Fellow of the Royal Historical Society

Carl Russell Fish (October 17, 1876 – July 10, 1932) was a University of Wisconsin–Madison historian.

== Biography ==
Born in Central Falls, Rhode Island, to Fredrick E. and Louisiana N. Fish on October 17, 1876. He claimed later in life that he wanted to be a professor since he was four years old. He graduated from Brown in 1897, and completed his Master's and Doctoral degree at Harvard University, finishing in 1898 and 1900, respectively. He was appointed Professor of History later that year at the University of Wisconsin–Madison. He served in a factory during World War I, then visited England in the fall of 1917 to direct the American University Club. There he met Rudyard Kipling, John Masefield, John Singer Sargent, Lady Astor, and James Bryce, all of whom he considered friends. After he returned, he married Jeanne l'Hommedieu of Cincinnati, Ohio, in 1919. They met while he was overseas.

He was again a professor at University of Wisconsin–Madison upon his return to the United States. He remained at Wisconsin until his death of pneumonia after finishing teaching his summer semester classes in 1932. He had a variety of opportunities for teaching elsewhere, and sometimes did teach summers on other campuses, but for the most part he remained at Wisconsin because he found its democratic atmosphere unsurpassed.

He was a fellow of the Royal Historical Society of Great Britain, and a member of Beta Theta Pi, Phi Beta Kappa, and Sigma Delta Chi fraternities, as well as the University and Madison clubs at the university. Fish was known for a bright red jacket he used to wear, especially when he spoke before school football games. He could sometimes be seen running cross country on campus, which he did for exercise. Courses he taught included American History, and "Representative Americans," about specific figures in American history. The latter course was his most popular one. It looked at United States history in terms of the country's leaders. He was widely acclaimed as a professor by his students, who said he made history live, and that he always had another anecdote about a famous historical figure.

The Growth of American Nationality, by Fred W. Wellborn, was dedicated to Fish. In the chapter titled "The Plantation Country," Fish describes a typical plantation where some details are not representative of world history, For example, on page 39 in History of America, Fish wrote,

The Slaves worked long hours, had none of these foreign luxuries, and were uneducated. They were, however a merry race, for they had no responsibilities. They had a real gift for music, and sang at their work and after it, songs which they had heard or which they had made for themselves.

== Books ==
- The Civil Service and the Patronage . New York: Longmans, Green, and Co. 1905... at Internet Archive, at Google
- The Development of American Nationality (1913, rev. ed. 1940) - A Textbook
- History of America (1928 2nd ed., American Book Company)
- American Diplomacy (1915, 5th ed. 1929)
- The Path of Empire, A Chronicle Of The United States As A World Power ("Chronicles of America" series, 1919, repr. 1983, Greenwood Press)
- The Rise of the Common Man, 1830–1850 ("History of American Life" Vol. VI, 1927, repr. 1971) online
- The American Civil War: An Interpretation (completed from notes of the author by William E. Smith, 1937).

He also wrote a review of Master's History of the People of the United States in 1914, in The Mississippi Valley Historical Review.

== Other sources ==
- "Professor Fish of U.W. Dies" July 11, 1932, in the Milwaukee Journal. (Found via Google, and the Wisconsin Historical Society Web site.)
