= South Central Falls Historic District =

Historic district in Rhode Island, United States

- U.S. National Register of Historic Places
- U.S. Historic district
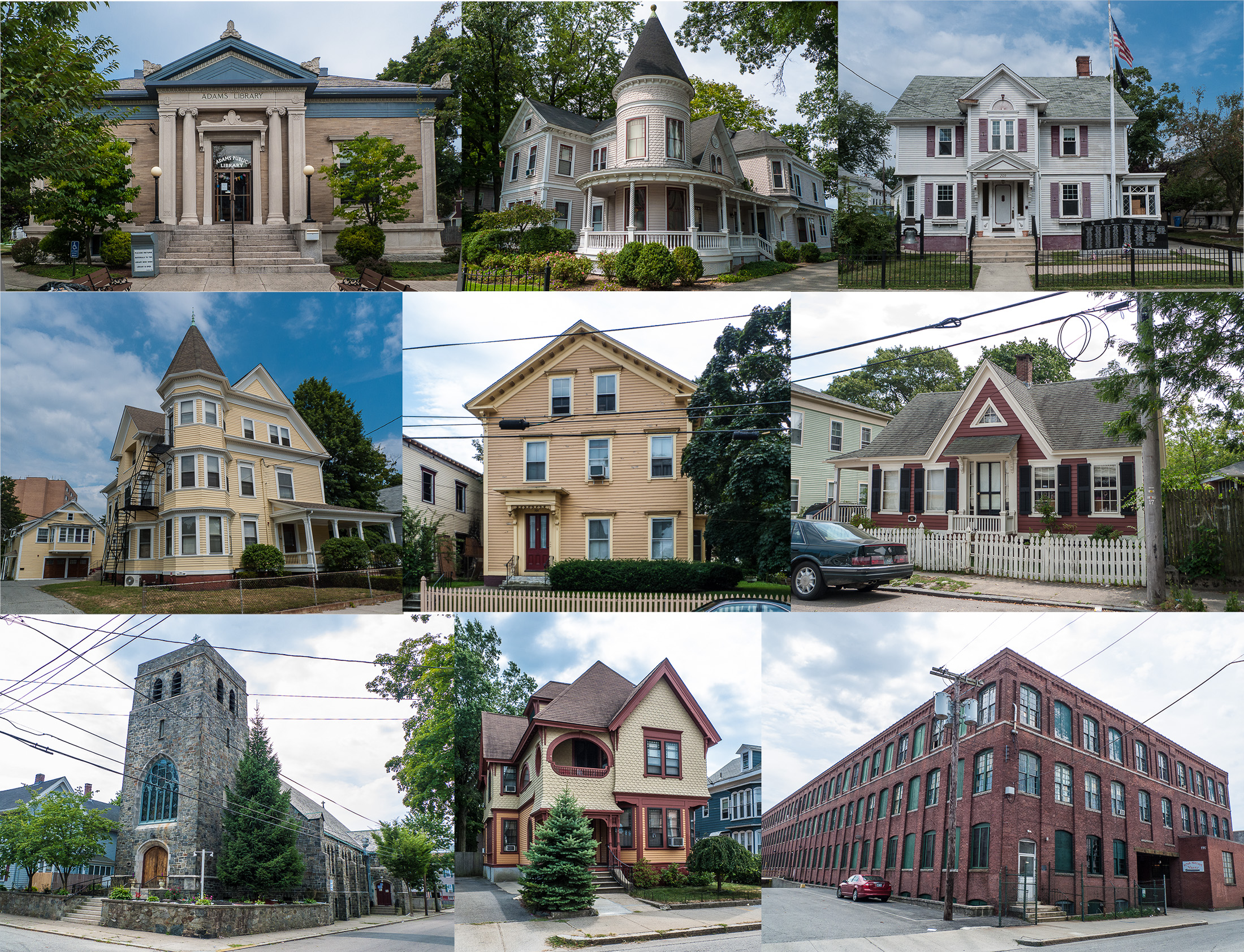
- Contributing properties to the South Central Falls Historic District, photographed in 2013

- Location within Rhode Island Location within the United States
- Location: Central Falls, Rhode Island
- Coordinates: 41°53′4″N 71°23′28″W
- Area: 55 acres (22 ha)
- Architect: Multiple
- Architectural style: Colonial Revival, Greek Revival, Late Victorian
- MPS: Central Falls MRA
- NRHP reference No.: 91000025
- Added to NRHP: January 31, 1991

The South Central Falls Historic District is a historic district in Central Falls, Rhode Island. It is a predominantly residential area, densely populated, which was developed most heavily in the late 19th century. It is bounded roughly by Broad Street to the east, the Pawtucket city line to the south, Dexter Street to the west, and Rand Street and Jenks Park to the north. It has 377 contributing buildings, most of which were built before 1920. The district was added to the National Register of Historic Places in 1991.

Although the district is predominantly residential, it has a modest number of non-residential civic, religious, and industrial buildings. The only industrial facility is the Hemphill Mill on Dexter Street, a four-story brick structure built in 1909. There are three church buildings, two of which still see ecclesiastical use: St. George's Episcopal is a stone church built in 1922, and there is a wood-frame Queen Anne-style church building at 161-165 Cross Street which was built in 1893 and has served several Protestant congregations. Two school buildings survive: the Central Street School, an Italianate wood-frame structure built in 1881 which is separately listed on the National Register, and the present Central Falls City Hall, an imposing brick building built as a high school in 1889 with Queen Anne styling when the area was still part of Lincoln. The Adams Library building is a Classical Revival structure built in 1910.

The housing in the district consists mainly of vernacular wood-frame structures with one to three units. Architectural embellishments are typically modest, following the style of the time, resulting in a significant number of modest worker cottages with some Italianate styling, which predominated during the early period of the area's development. Large single-family houses are comparatively rare in the district; the most notable one is the Samuel B. Conant House, a Colonial Revival house built in 1895 for a Pawtucket printshop owner.

== See also ==
- National Register of Historic Places listings in Providence County, Rhode Island
