= Gately Building =

- U.S. National Register of Historic Places
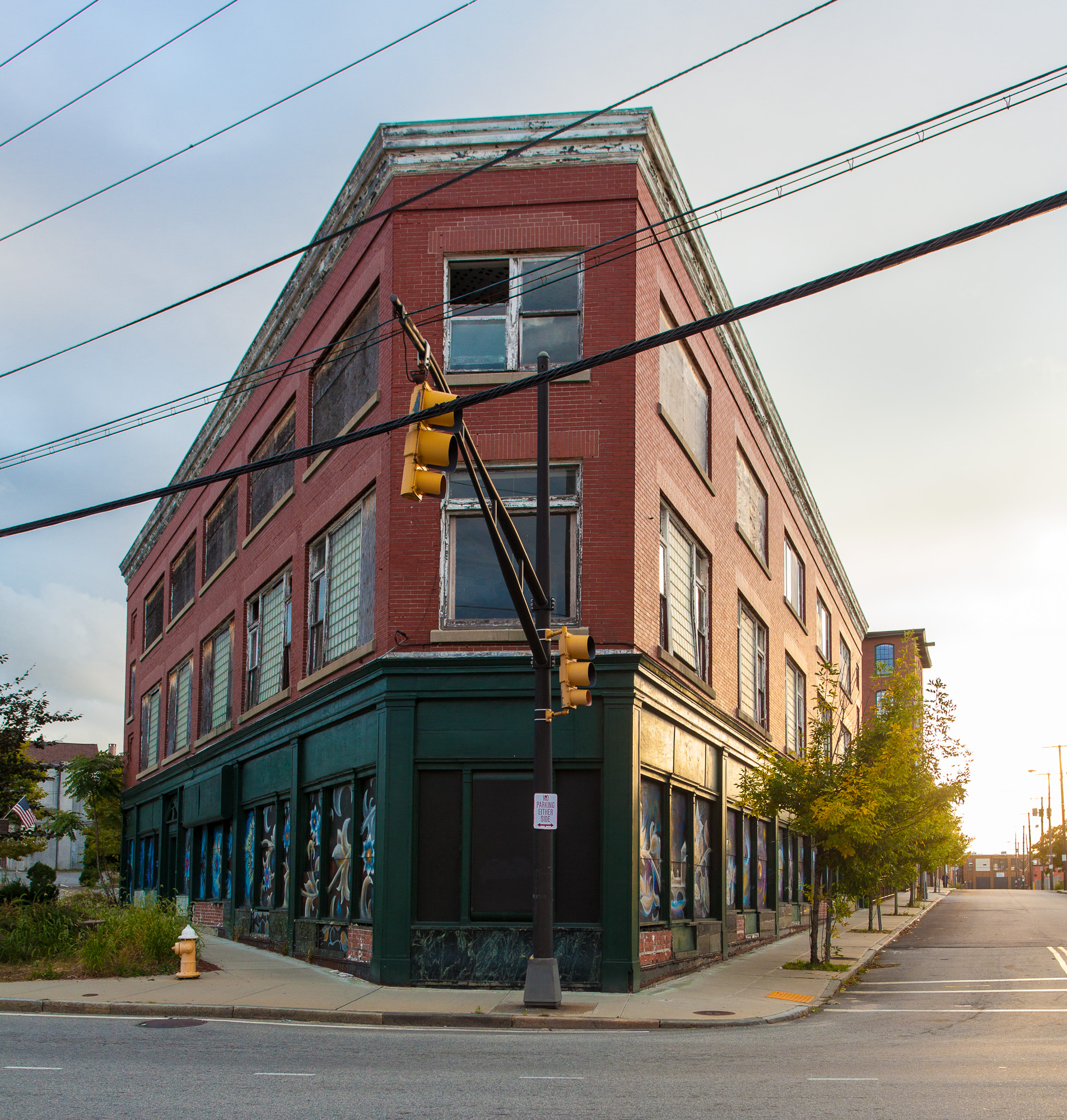
- The building before conversion to residences

- Location within Rhode Island Location within the United States
- Location: Pawtucket, Rhode Island
- Coordinates: 41°52′40.6986″N 71°23′14.8446″W
- Built: 1914
- MPS: Pawtucket MRA
- NRHP reference No.: 12000135
- Added to NRHP: March 20, 2012

The Gately Building is a historic commercial building at 337–353 Main Street (alternatively given as 335 Main St or 2 Bayley St.) in downtown Pawtucket, Rhode Island The building was listed on the National Register of Historic Places in 2012. In 2015, the property was renovated into a 13-unit apartment building.

== Style ==
The three-story flatiron building was built in 1914 to fill in a triangular lot on the fringe of the city's central business district. It has a flat roof, a steel frame, and is clad in brick with granite and marble trim, with a granite foundation and cast iron fronts on the first floor. Its Colonial Revival styling dates to alterations in the 1930s converting its ground-floor retail spaces into a single banking center. The floor space is about 5,000 square feet on each floor. Large windows surround the building on all sides.

== History ==
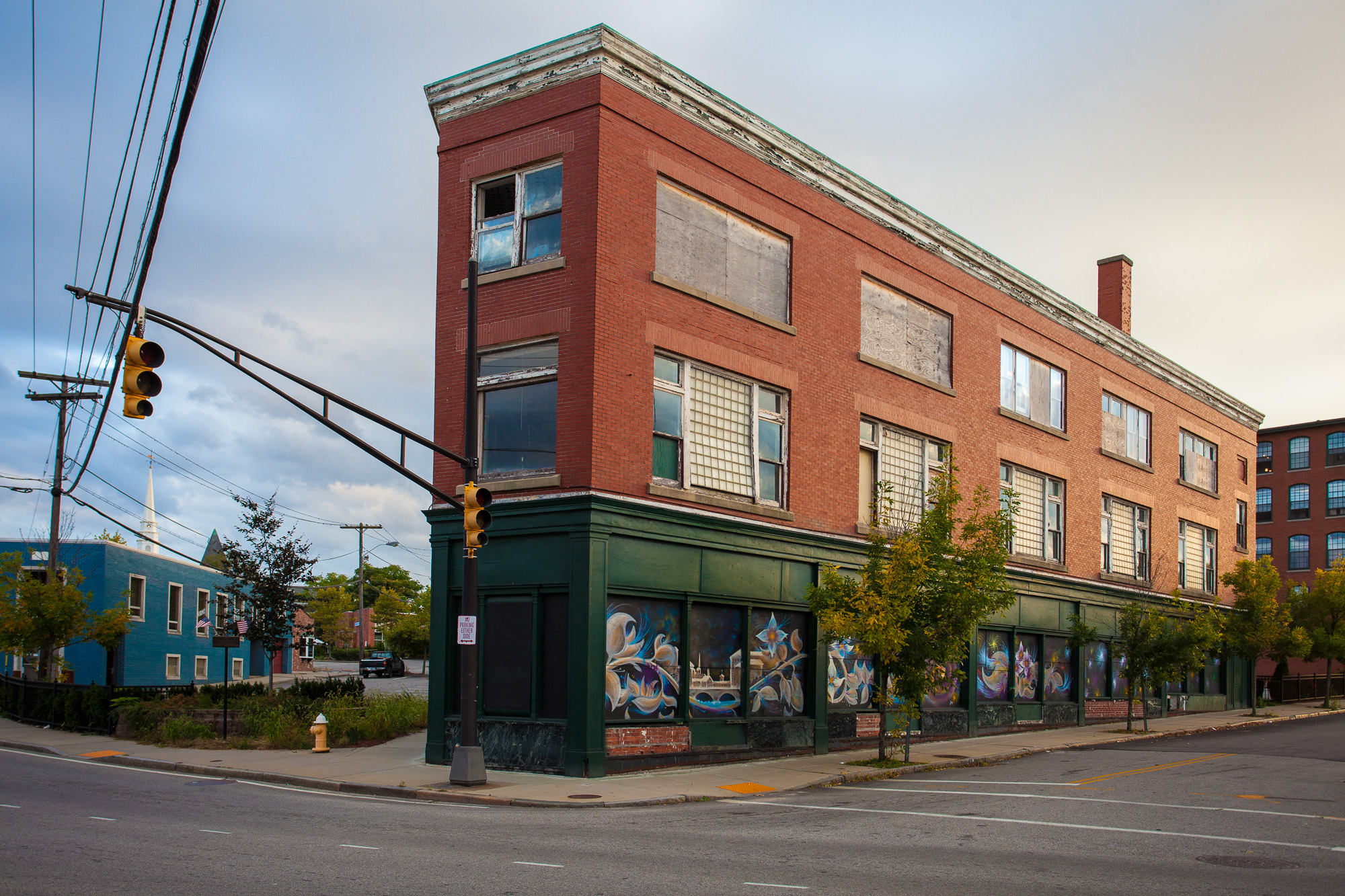
Another view, before renovation

The building was commissioned by Anne E. Gately (b. 1854), heiress to the Gately furniture and clothing store. She purchased the building which previously stood on this lot, had it demolished, and the current building constructed. Architect Albert H. Humes was superintendent of construction, although it is not known if he also designed the building. Pawtucket Architect Samuel B Fuller designed the building.

When it was opened in 1914, the ground floor was home to four street-level storefronts. By 1935, the Old Colony Cooperative Bank occupied the entire first floor. The building also contained offices of The Providence Journal newspaper and a dental office; the latter being the building's longest tenant, from 1941 to 1986.

The building stood vacant and neglected from 1993 to 2015, slowly deteriorating and becoming a detriment to neighborhood development.

=== Conversion to residences ===
In 2015, money from the state's 2012 affordable housing bond was used to convert the building to a housing complex with 13 rental units and community space. The renovation restored the building to its original historic appearance. In September 2016, the building was praised by Governor Gina Raimondo and Mayor Donald Grebien as a successful example of how affordable housing bonds can revitalize neighborhoods and create jobs.

== See also ==
- National Register of Historic Places listings in Pawtucket, Rhode Island
