= Samuel B. Conant House =

Historic house in Rhode Island, United States

- U.S. National Register of Historic Places
- U.S. Historic district – Contributing property
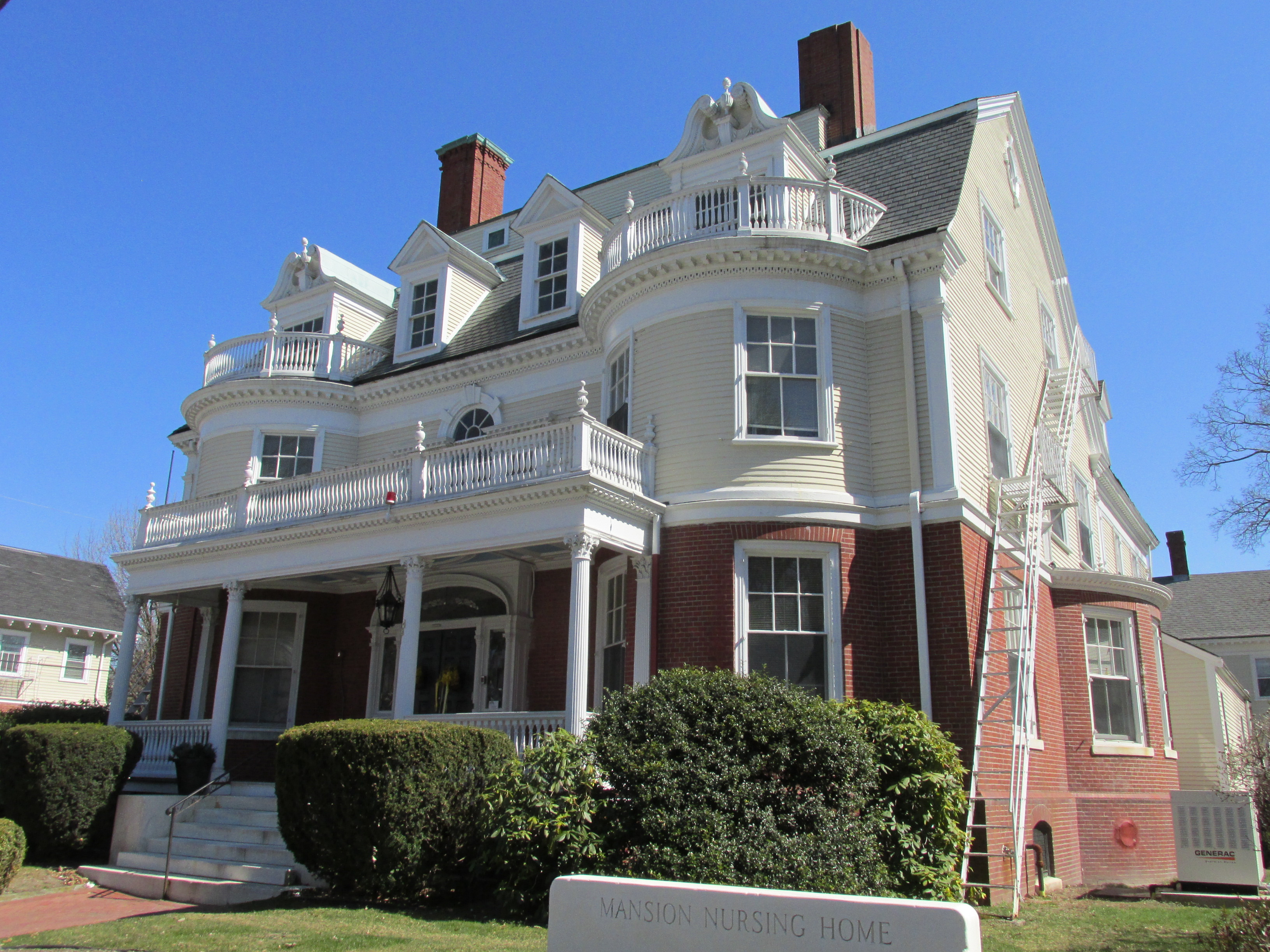
- Samuel B. Conant House

- Location within Rhode Island Location within the United States
- Location: 104 Clay Street, Central Falls, Rhode Island
- Coordinates: 41°52′59″N 71°23′25″W
- Built: 1895
- Architect: Stone, Carpenter & Willson
- Architectural style: Colonial Revival
- Part of: South Central Falls Historic District (ID91000025)
- MPS: Central Falls MRA
- NRHP reference No.: 79000005

Significant dates
- Added to NRHP: April 6, 1979
- Designated CP: January 31, 1991

The Samuel B. Conant House is an historic house in Central Falls, Rhode Island. This 2 1/2-story structure was built in 1895 for Samuel Conant, president of a Pawtucket printing firm, and is one of the city's finest Colonial Revival houses. Its exterior is brick on the first floor and clapboard above, beneath a gambrel roof punctured by several gable dormers. The main facade has two symmetrical round bays, which rise to the roof and are topped by low balustrades. A single-story porch extends between the center points of these bays, and is also topped by a low balustrade.

The house was designed by Stone, Carpenter & Willson, Providence architects.

The house was listed on the National Register of Historic Places in 1979.

== See also ==
- National Register of Historic Places listings in Providence County, Rhode Island
