= Central Falls Mill Historic District =

Historic district in Rhode Island, United States

- U.S. National Register of Historic Places
- U.S. Historic district
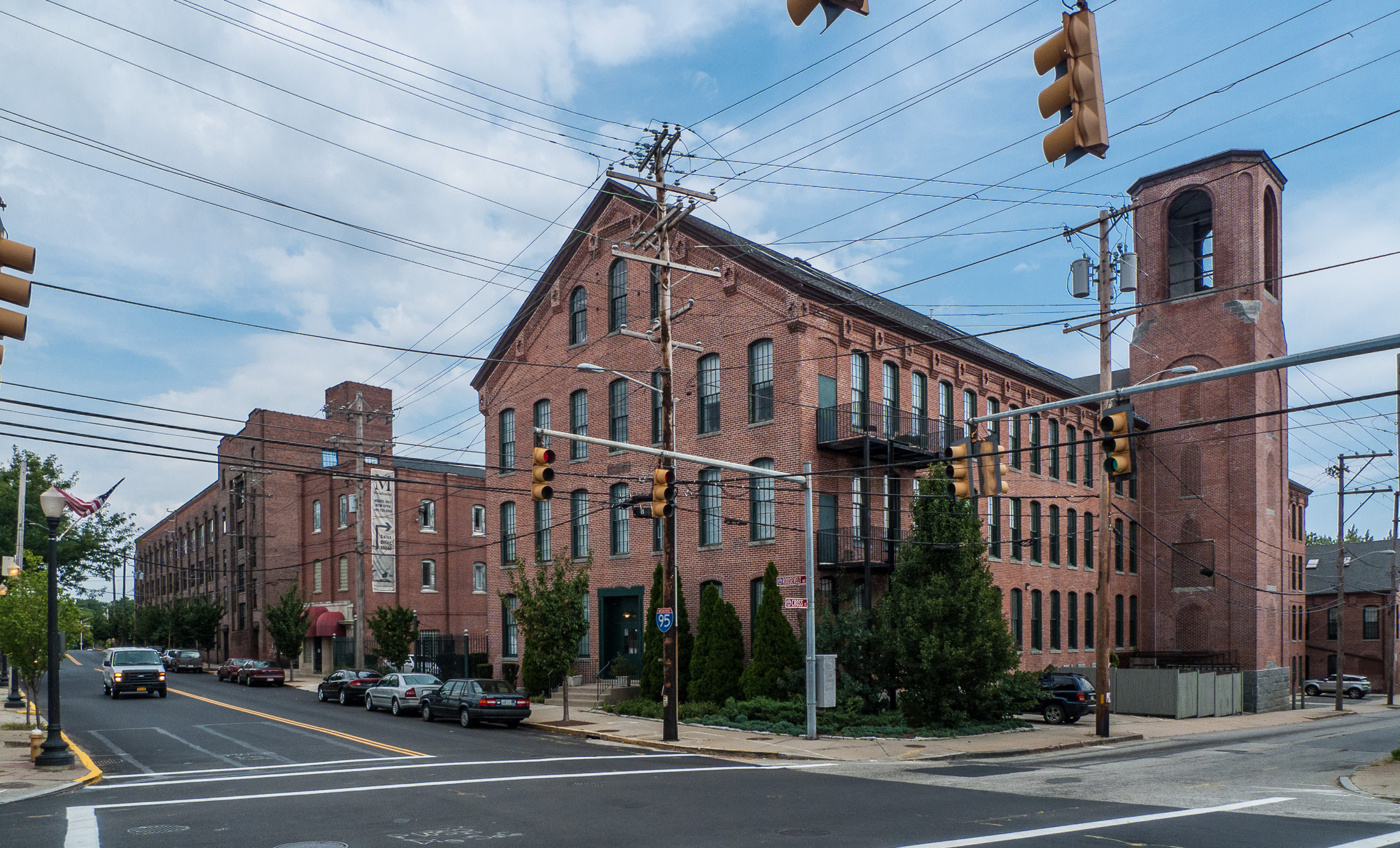

- Location within Rhode Island Location within the United States
- Location: Central Falls, Rhode Island
- Coordinates: 41°53′11″N 71°22′55″W
- Built: 1825
- Architect: William R. Walker
- MPS: Central Falls MRA
- NRHP reference No.: 76000007 (original); 100002058 (increase)

Significant dates
- Added to NRHP: July 2, 1976
- Boundary increase: January 29, 2018

The Central Falls Mill Historic District is located between Roosevelt Avenue and the Blackstone River in Central Falls, Rhode Island. It encompasses a collection of six mill buildings, as well as a stone dam which impounds the river, representing the finest mill constructions in the city during the 19th century. The layout of the buildings, whose short ends face the river and Roosevelt Avenue, was defined by a series of trenches (now filled in) which channeled water from the river to power the machinery of the mills. The oldest building dates to 1825, and the most recent to c. 1910; all have been modified to some extent by later industrial tenants.

The historic district was listed on the National Register of Historic Places in 1976, and was enlarged in 2018.

== See also ==
- National Register of Historic Places listings in Providence County, Rhode Island
