= Central Street School =

- U.S. National Register of Historic Places
- U.S. Historic district – Contributing property
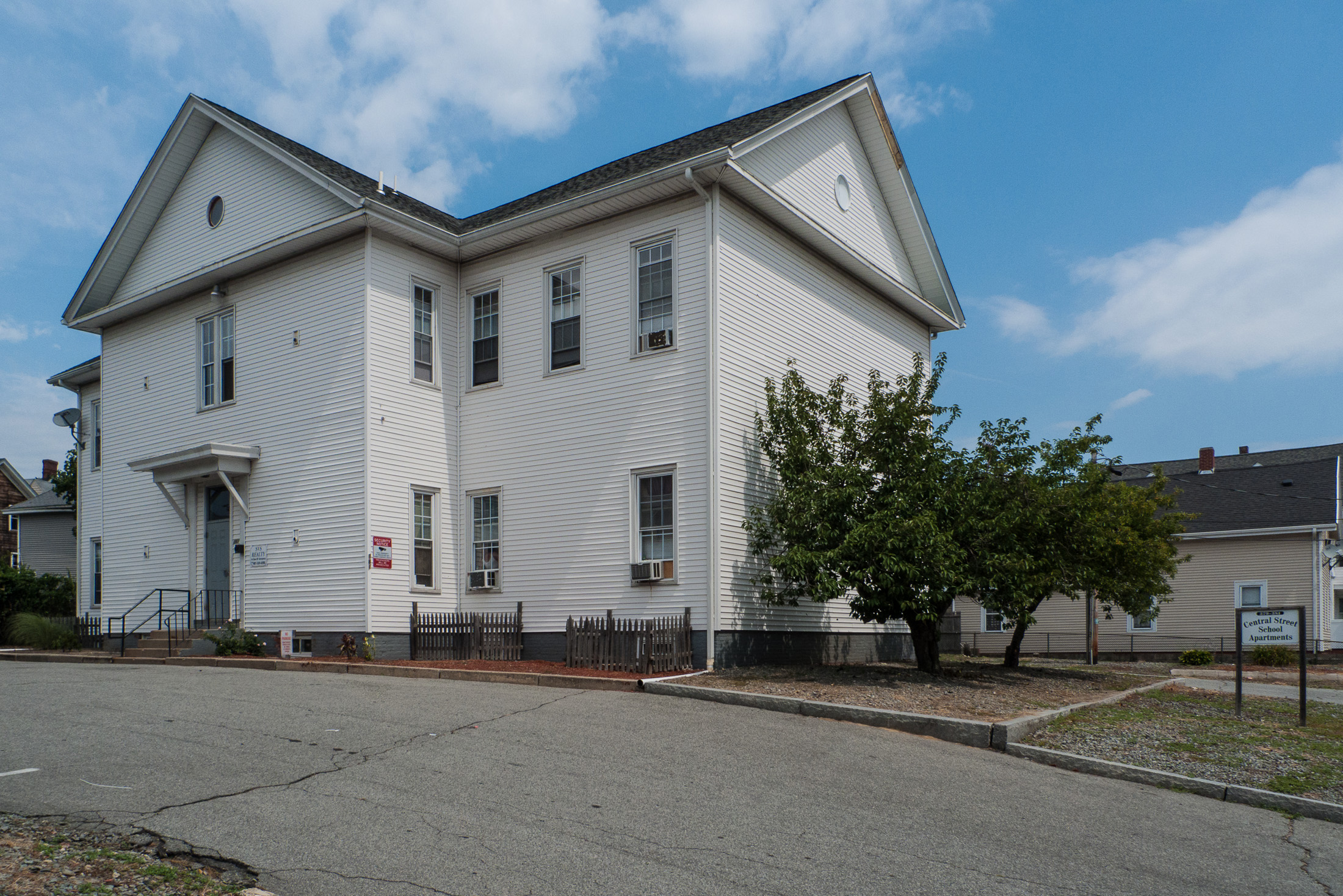
- Central Street School in 2013

- Location within Rhode Island Location within the United States
- Location: Central Falls, Rhode Island
- Coordinates: 41°53′4″N 71°23′38″W
- Built: 1881
- Part of: South Central Falls Historic District (ID91000025)
- MPS: Central Falls MRA
- NRHP reference No.: 79000004

Significant dates
- Added to NRHP: April 6, 1979
- Designated CP: January 31, 1991

The Central Street School is an historic school building located at 379 Central Street in Central Falls, Rhode Island. This 2 1/2-story wood-frame building was built by the city in 1881 to meet burgeoning demand for education brought about by the success of the local mills. The building is cruciform in shape, with Italianated hooded entrances at opposited ends of the east–west axis of the building. Each floor houses two classrooms.

The building was listed on the National Register of Historic Places in 1979.

== See also ==
- National Register of Historic Places listings in Providence County, Rhode Island
