= Jenks Park & Cogswell Tower =

- U.S. National Register of Historic Places
- U.S. Historic district
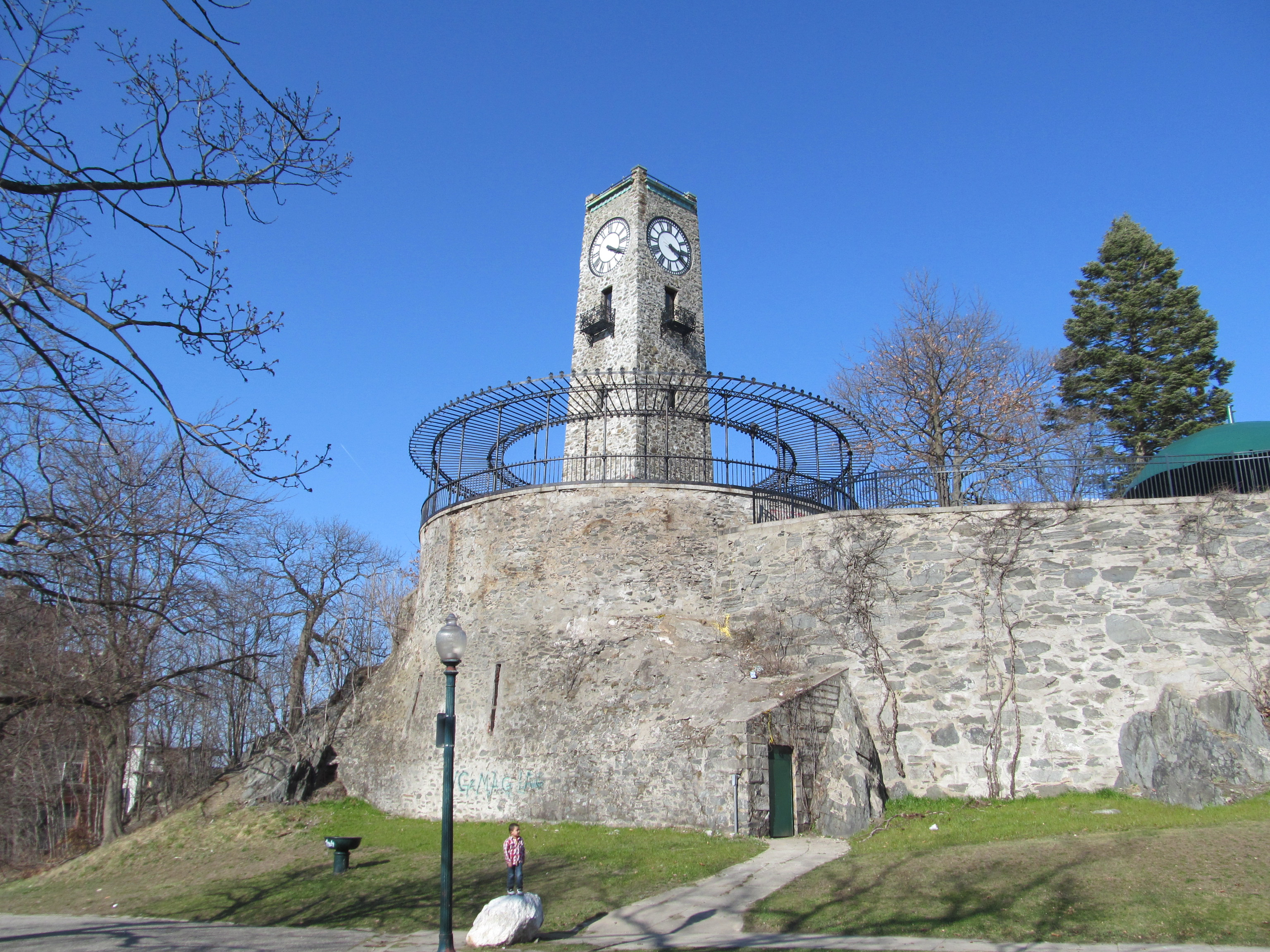
- Cogswell Tower

- Location within Rhode Island Location within the United States
- Location: Central Falls, Rhode Island
- Coordinates: 41°53′15″N 71°23′21″W
- Area: 5 acres (2.0 ha)
- Built: 1890
- Architect: Humes, Albert H.
- MPS: Central Falls MRA (AD)
- NRHP reference No.: 79000057
- Added to NRHP: April 6, 1979

Jenks Park is a city park of Central Falls, Rhode Island. The city's only large park, its development began in 1890 on land donated by Alvin Jenks. Its centerpiece is Cogswell Tower, designed by Pawtucket architect Albert H. Humes and built in 1904. A gift of Caroline Cogswell, the tower stands 18 feet (5.5 m) square and 70 feet (21 m) tall. It has been the symbol of the City of Central Falls since its construction. The tower is supported by a brick barrel vault resting atop the historic Dexter's Ledge, from which, during King Philip's War in 1676, Native American scouts saw the approach of Captain Michael Pierce, and a company of Plymouth soldiers from the heights. Pierce's forces were ambushed and nearly annihilated by the Native Americans in "Pierce's Fight" at a site along the Blackstone River on March 26, 1676, where Pierce Park now stands.

The park was listed on the National Register of Historic Places in 1979.

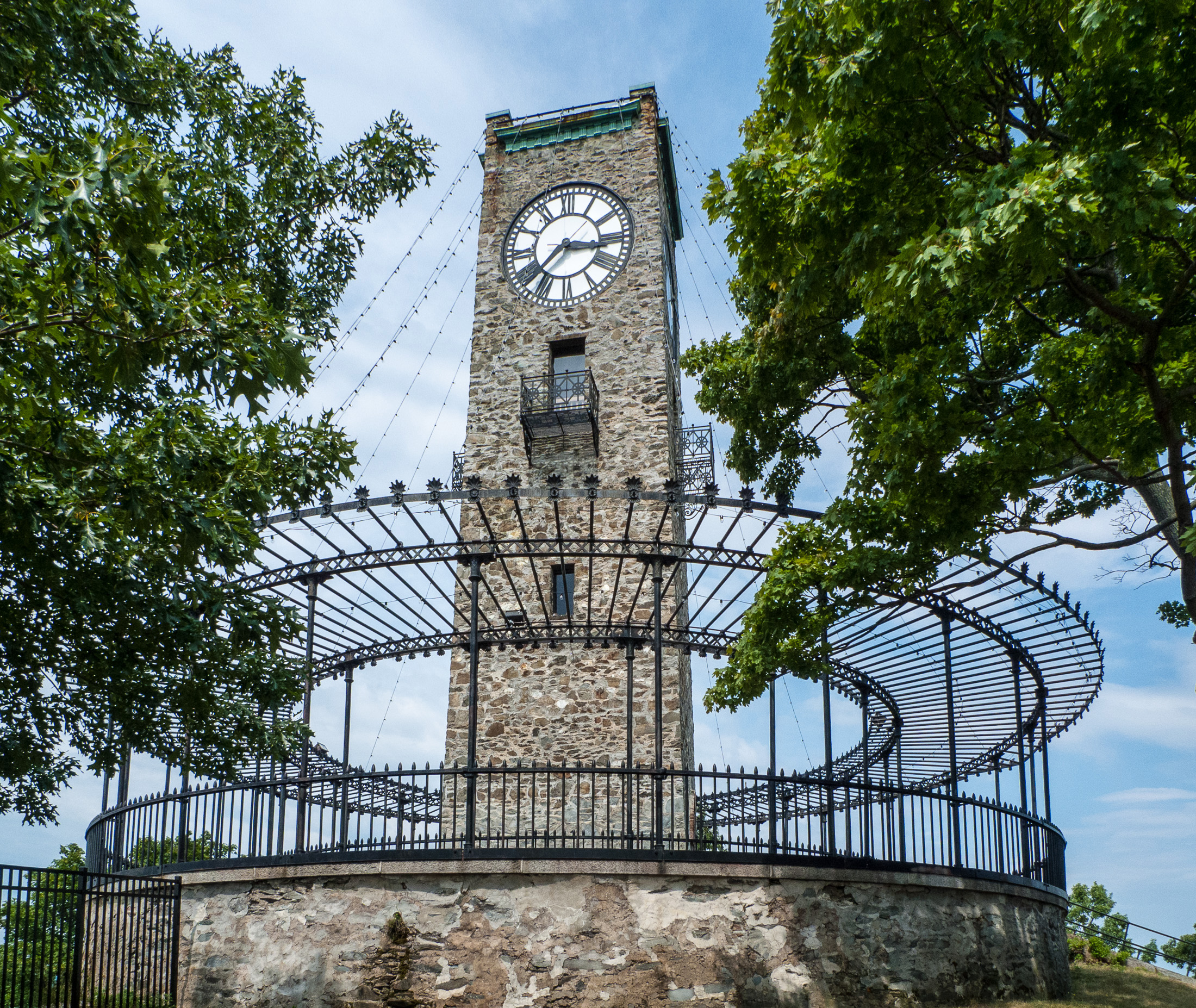
Another view of the tower

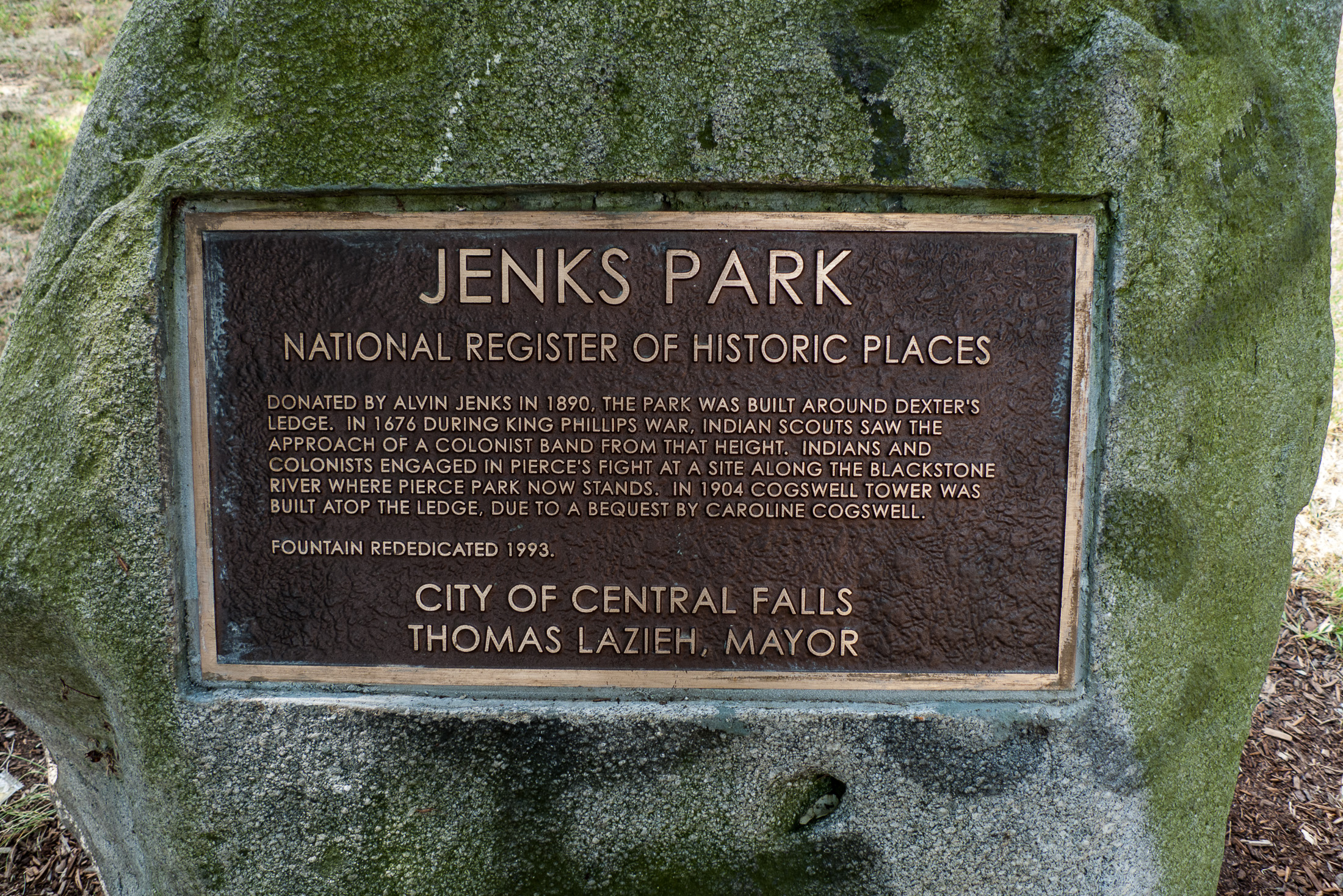
NRHP plaque in the park

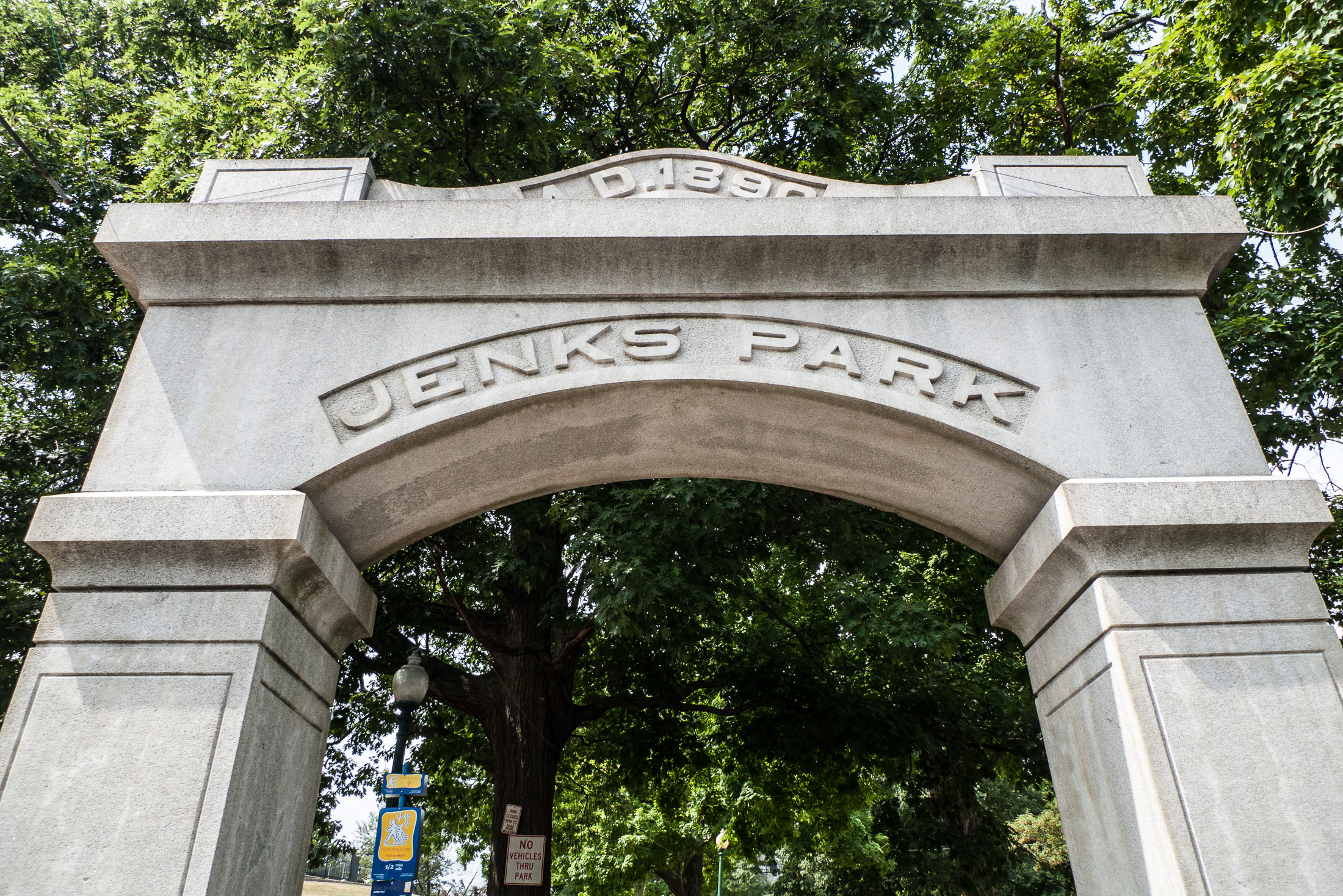
Entry gate to Jenks Park

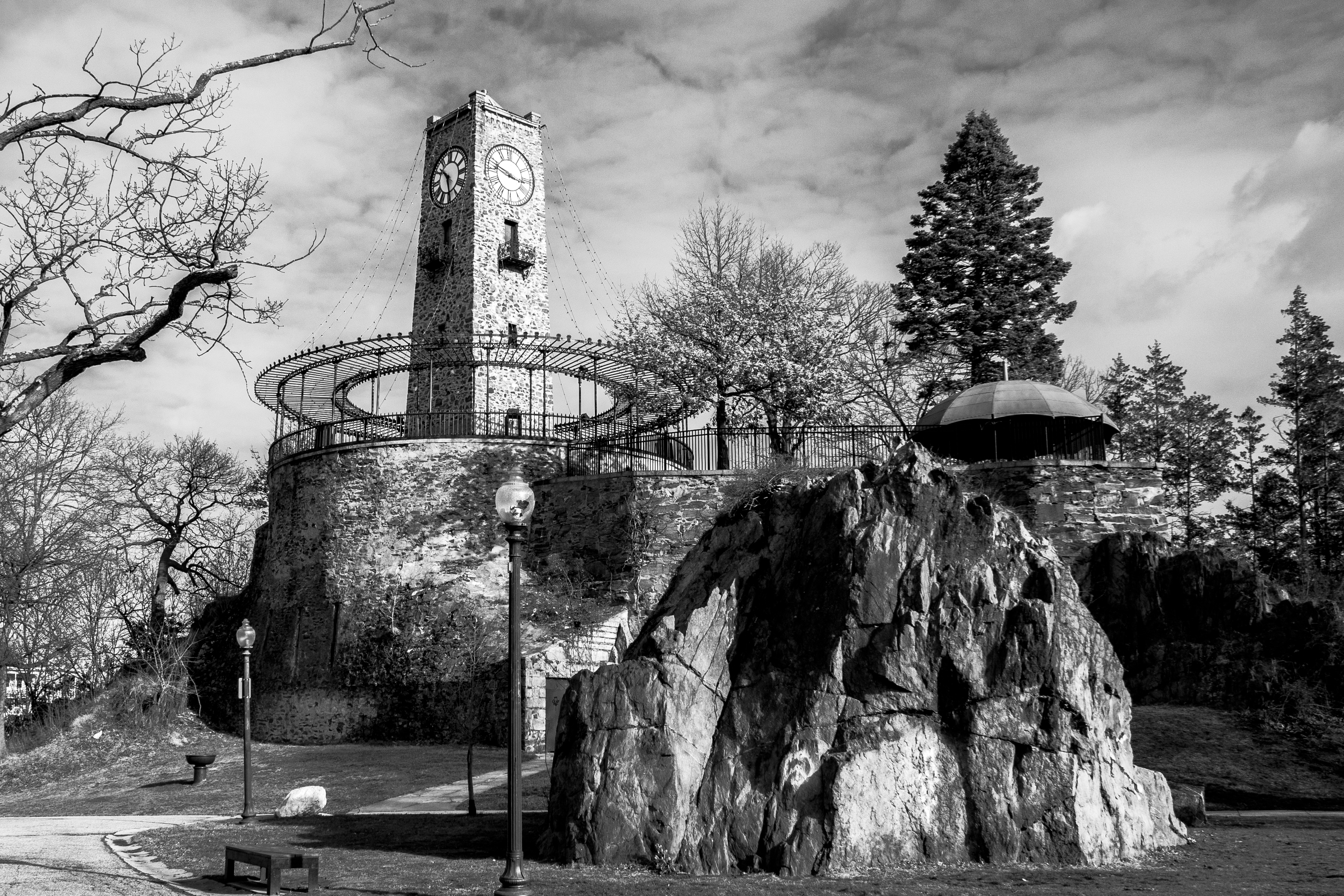
A view of Jenks Park, including the tower, a steel umbrella/pagoda, and natural rock formations.

== See also ==
- National Register of Historic Places listings in Providence County, Rhode Island
