= Central Falls, Rhode Island =

City in Rhode Island, United States

- City
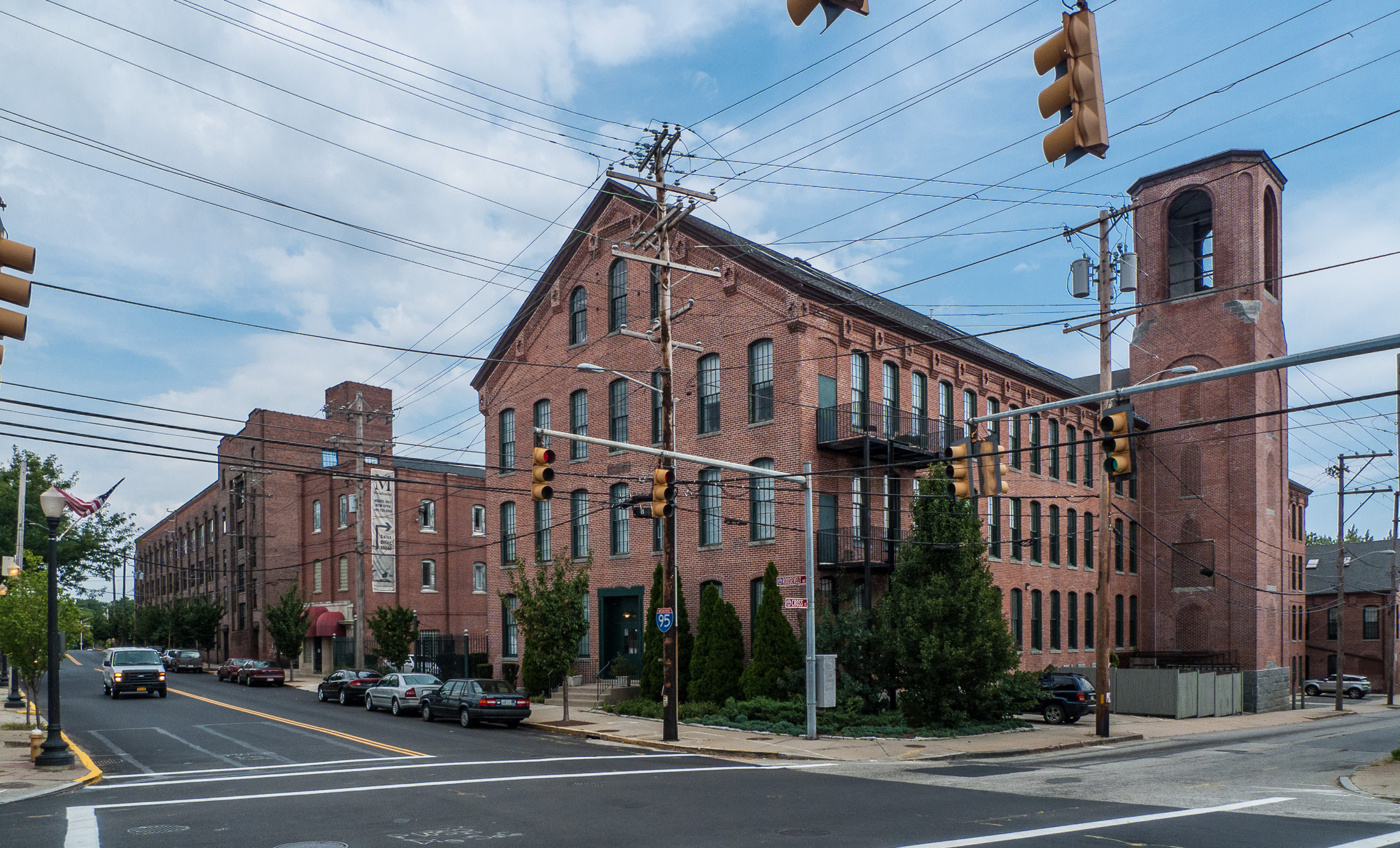
- Central Falls Mill Historic District

- Seal Coat of arms
- Motto: "A City With A Bright Future"
- Location in Providence County and the state of Rhode Island.

- Location in the United States
- Coordinates: 41°53′30″N 71°23′28″W
- Country: United States
- State: Rhode Island
- County: Providence
- Settled: 1675
- Incorporated: February 25, 1895

Government
  - Type: Mayor-council
  - Mayor: Maria Rivera

Area
  - Total: 1.27 sq mi (3.30 km^{2})
  - Land: 1.19 sq mi (3.09 km^{2})
  - Water: 0.081 sq mi (0.21 km^{2})
- Elevation: 85 ft (26 m)

Population (2020)
  - Total: 22,583
  - Density: 18,913.8/sq mi (7,302.64/km^{2})
- Time zone: UTC−5 (Eastern)
  - Summer (DST): UTC−4 (Eastern)
- ZIP Code: 02863
- Area code: 401
- FIPS code: 44-14140
- GNIS feature ID: 1218931
- Website: https://www.centralfallsri.gov/

Central Falls is a city in Providence County, Rhode Island, United States. The population was 22,583 at the 2020 census. With an area of only 1.29 square miles (3.3 km^{2}), it is the smallest and most densely populated city in the smallest state, and the 23rd most densely populated incorporated place in the United States.

It is one of only four incorporated places in New England that have a higher population density than the city of Boston, ranking second, behind the Massachusetts city of Somerville, an inner suburb of Boston. The city takes its name from a waterfall on the Blackstone River.

Central Falls went into receivership in May 2010, then filed for bankruptcy in August 2011. After cutting jobs and services, it came out of bankruptcy in September 2012.

== History ==
Before Europeans arrived, the area was home to Nipmuc, Wampanoag and Narragansett peoples.

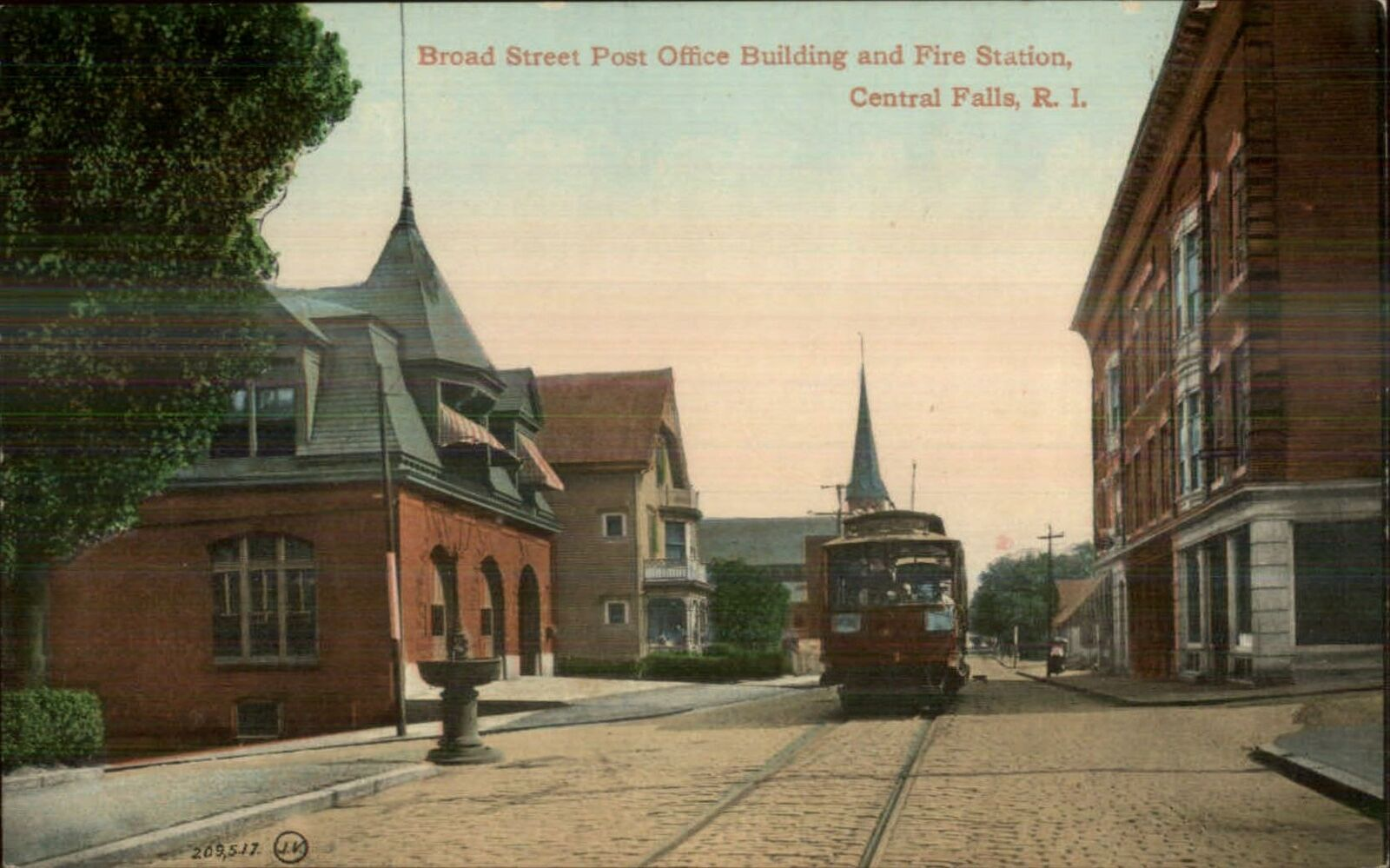
Broad Street c. 1908

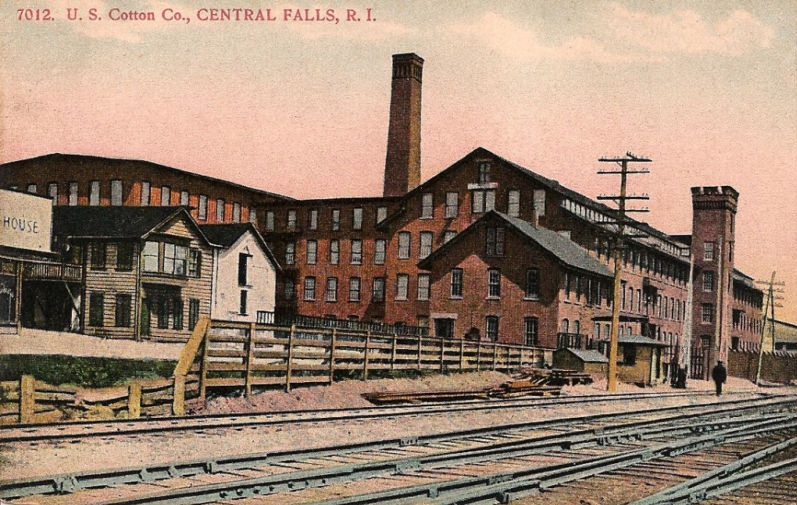
U.S. Cotton Co. c. 1910

Central Falls has historic significance as the site of a major battle during King Philip's War. It was here, on March 26, 1676, that Narragansett Indians ambushed Captain Michael Pierce and his Plymouth Colony troops who, with 20 Christian Wampanoag Indians, were pursuing them. Nearly all those ambushed were killed, including nine taken prisoner and later tortured to death at nearby Cumberland. A stone memorial marks the mass grave at the site known as "Nine Men's Misery".

In the 18th century, Captain Stephen Jenks built a trip hammer and blacksmith shop along the Blackstone River, forming the nucleus of what eventually became Central Falls. Other manufacturers, including a chocolate maker, set up shop in the building, and the new village became known as Chocolateville.

In 1824, Jenks suggested the name Central Falls, thus giving the village its permanent name. Central Falls was incorporated as a town in 1730.

Originally, Central Falls was one of the many villages within the town of Smithfield, but in 1871, having experienced a growth spurt, it split into three smaller towns: Smithfield, North Smithfield and Lincoln. Central Falls then became part of the town of Lincoln. Lincoln experienced its own growth spurt, so in 1895 Lincoln split into two towns, giving rise to the city of Central Falls.

While Quakers made up the majority of the first European settlers in the area, they were soon followed by a diverse mix of immigrants from Ireland, Scotland and French Canada. By the 20th century, Central Falls had experienced its own population explosion and for a while was the nation's most densely populated city.

In 1922, Central Falls' textile mills were temporarily shut down by the New England Textile Strike over an attempted wage cut and hours increase.

In recent decades, a large number of Hispanic immigrants have resided in Central Falls. Central Falls has historically been an extremely diverse city, so much so that when the city celebrated its 100th anniversary with a parade in 1995, more than 100 countries were represented.

== Geography ==
Central Falls is located at 41°53′24″N 71°23′33″W (41.889863, −71.392606).

According to the United States Census Bureau, the city has an area of 1.3 square miles (3.4 km^{2}), of which 1.2 square miles (3.1 km^{2}) is land and 0.1 square miles (0.26 km^{2}) (6.20%) is water. It is drained by the Blackstone River.

== Demographics ==
Historical population
Census	Pop.	Note	%±
1900	18,167		—
1910	22,754		25.2%
1920	24,174		6.2%
1930	25,808		6.8%
1940	25,248		−2.2%
1950	23,550		−6.7%
1960	19,858		−15.7%
1970	18,716		−5.8%
1980	16,995		−9.2%
1990	17,637		3.8%
2000	18,928		7.3%
2010	19,376		2.4%
2020	22,583		16.6%
U.S. Decennial Census

=== 2020 census ===
As of the 2020 census, Central Falls had a population of 22,583, with 7,700 households and 4,315 families. The population density was 18,913.7 per square mile (7,302.6/km^{2}). There were 8,191 housing units at an average density of 6,860.1 per square mile (2,648.7/km^{2}).

There were 8,191 housing units, of which 6.0% were vacant. The homeowner vacancy rate was 0.8% and the rental vacancy rate was 2.9%.

Of the 7,700 households, 43.0% had children under the age of 18 living in them; 31.9% were married-couple households; 22.7% were households with a male householder and no spouse or partner present; and 36.2% were households with a female householder and no spouse or partner present. About 26.4% of all households were made up of individuals and 8.8% had someone living alone who was 65 years of age or older.

Racial composition as of the 2020 census
Race	Number	Percent
White	6,308	27.9%
Black or African American	1,687	7.5%
American Indian and Alaska Native	523	2.3%
Asian	134	0.6%
Native Hawaiian and Other Pacific Islander	17	0.1%
Some other race	8,840	39.1%
Two or more races	5,074	22.5%
Hispanic or Latino (of any race)	14,752	65.3%

28.4% of the population was under the age of 18, 10.9% from 18 to 24, 30.7% from 25 to 44, 21.2% from 45 to 64, and 8.8% who were 65 years of age or older. The median age was 31.4 years. For every 100 females, the population had 102.7 males, and for every 100 females ages 18 and older, there were 101.2 males.

100.0% of residents lived in urban areas, while 0.0% lived in rural areas.

The average household size was 3.1 and the average family size was 3.7. The percent of those with a bachelor's degree or higher was estimated to be 5.2% of the population.

The 2016–2020 5-year American Community Survey estimates show that the median household income was $34,689 (with a margin of error of +/- $2,947) and the median family income was $36,928 (+/- $4,820). Males had a median income of $24,390 (+/- $2,861) versus $21,893 (+/- $3,074) for females. The median income for those above 16 years old was $23,205 (+/- $2,867).

Approximately, 23.7% of families and 29.9% of the population were below the poverty line, including 39.4% of those under the age of 18 and 17.8% of those ages 65 or over.

=== 2010 census ===
In the 2010 U.S. census, Central Falls was the only majority-minority municipality in Rhode Island with 60.31 percent of its residents identifying as Hispanic/Latino with Puerto Ricans, Guatemalans, and Colombians making up the largest share among the ethnicity.

According to the U.S. Census Bureau's American Community Survey, Central Falls had a median household income of $28,901 during the 2012-2016 estimates, making it the poorest municipality in Rhode Island.

=== 2000 census ===
In the 2000 census, there were 18,928 people, 6,696 households, and 4,359 families residing in the city. The population density was 15,652.0 inhabitants per square mile (6,043.3/km^{2}). There were 7,270 housing units at an average density of 6,011.7 per square mile (2,321.1/km^{2}). The racial makeup of the city was 57.16% White, 5.82% African American, 0.57% Native American, 0.68% Asian, 0.04% Pacific Islander, 28.35% from other races, and 7.38% from two or more races. Hispanic or Latino of any race were 47.77% of the population.

There were 6,696 households, out of which 38.9% had children under the age of 18 living with them, 36.4% were married couples living together, 21.6% had a female householder with no husband present, and 34.9% were non-families. 29.3% of all households were made up of individuals, and 12.7% had someone living alone who was 65 years of age or older. The average household size was 2.74 and the average family size was 3.38.

In the city, 29.2% were aged under the age of 18, 11.8% from 18 to 24, 31.6% from 25 to 44, 15.8% from 45 to 64, and 11.5% who were 65 years of age or older. The median age was 30 years. For every 100 females, there were 98.7 males. For every 100 females age 18 and over, there were 93.7 males.

The median income for a household in the city was $22,628, and the median income for a family was $26,844. Males had a median income of $23,854 versus $18,544 for females. The per capita income for the city was $10,825. About 25.9% of families and 29.0% of the population were below the poverty line, including 40.8% of those under age 18 and 29.3% of those age 65 or over.

== Education ==
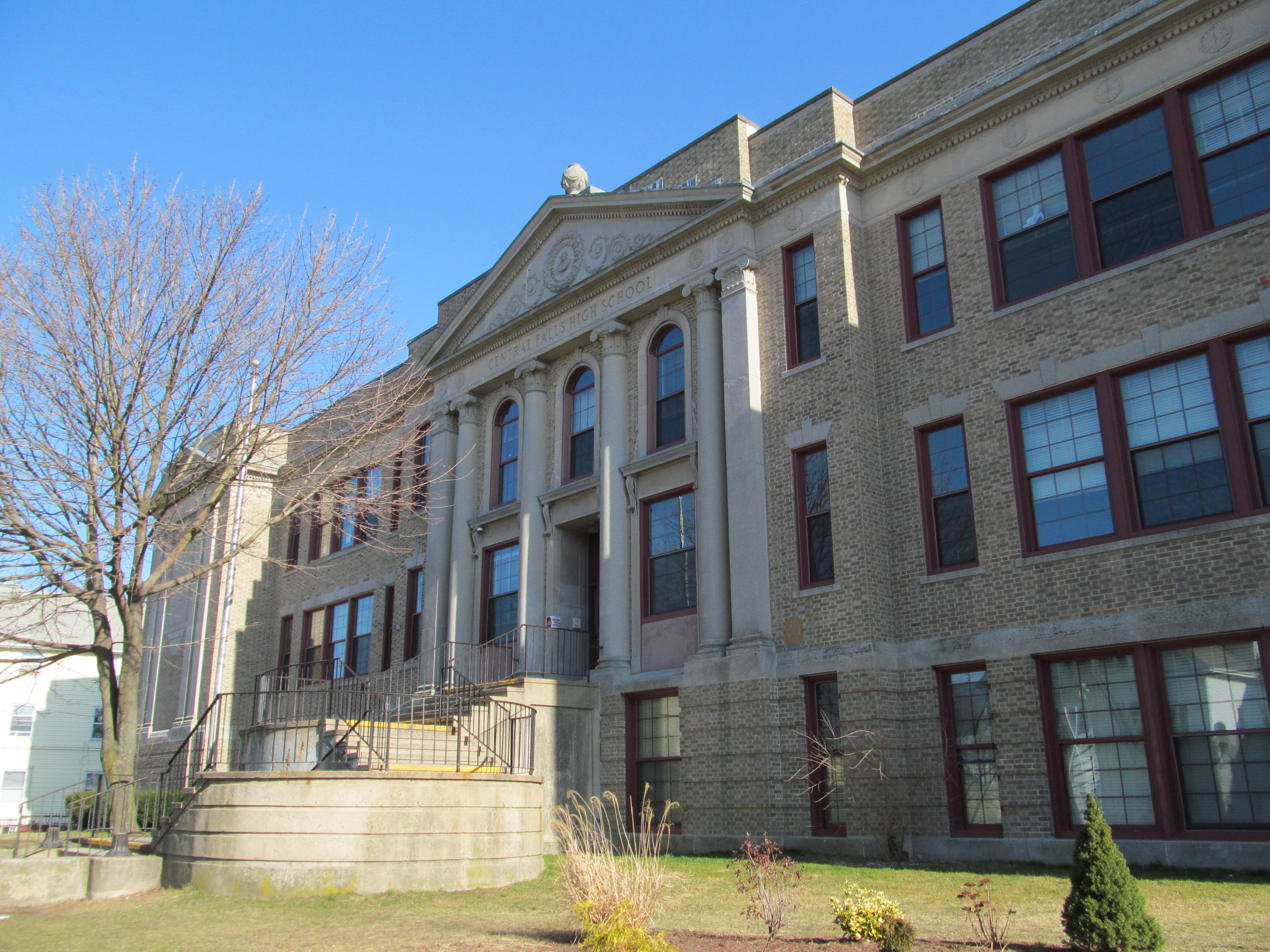
Central Falls High School

Residents are served by the Central Falls School District. This school district is funded and appointed by the State of Rhode Island Department of Education.

In February 2010, the entire faculty and administrative staff of Central Falls High School was fired after the teachers' union refused to accept one of the "No Child Left Behind" options for restructuring failing schools. In accordance with NCLB legislation, schools deemed failing have four options to follow for restructuring. The superintendent chose the "turnaround model", which requires a district to fire the entire staff (teachers and administrators). They may rehire up to 50% of the teachers for the beginning of the next school year. In 2009, the school had a graduation rate of around 50%, and 7% of 11th-graders were proficient in mathematics.

This school had been identified as one of the worst in the state. The teachers' union sued the school district, challenging the requirement that teachers reapply for their jobs. The Obama administration sided with the school board. In May 2010, the teachers were rehired when they agreed to work the extra time required.

In the 2000 U.S. census, 5.9% of Central Falls residents 25 and older had a bachelor's or advanced college degree.

There has been at least one Catholic school in Central Falls since 1895. By 1908, there were three: St. Matthew's, Holy Trinity, and Notre Dame.

In 1995, these three schools combined to create St. Elizabeth Ann Seton Academy, in the building originally serving St. Matthew's. St. Elizabeth Ann Seton Academy is the only non-public school in Central Falls.

== Government ==
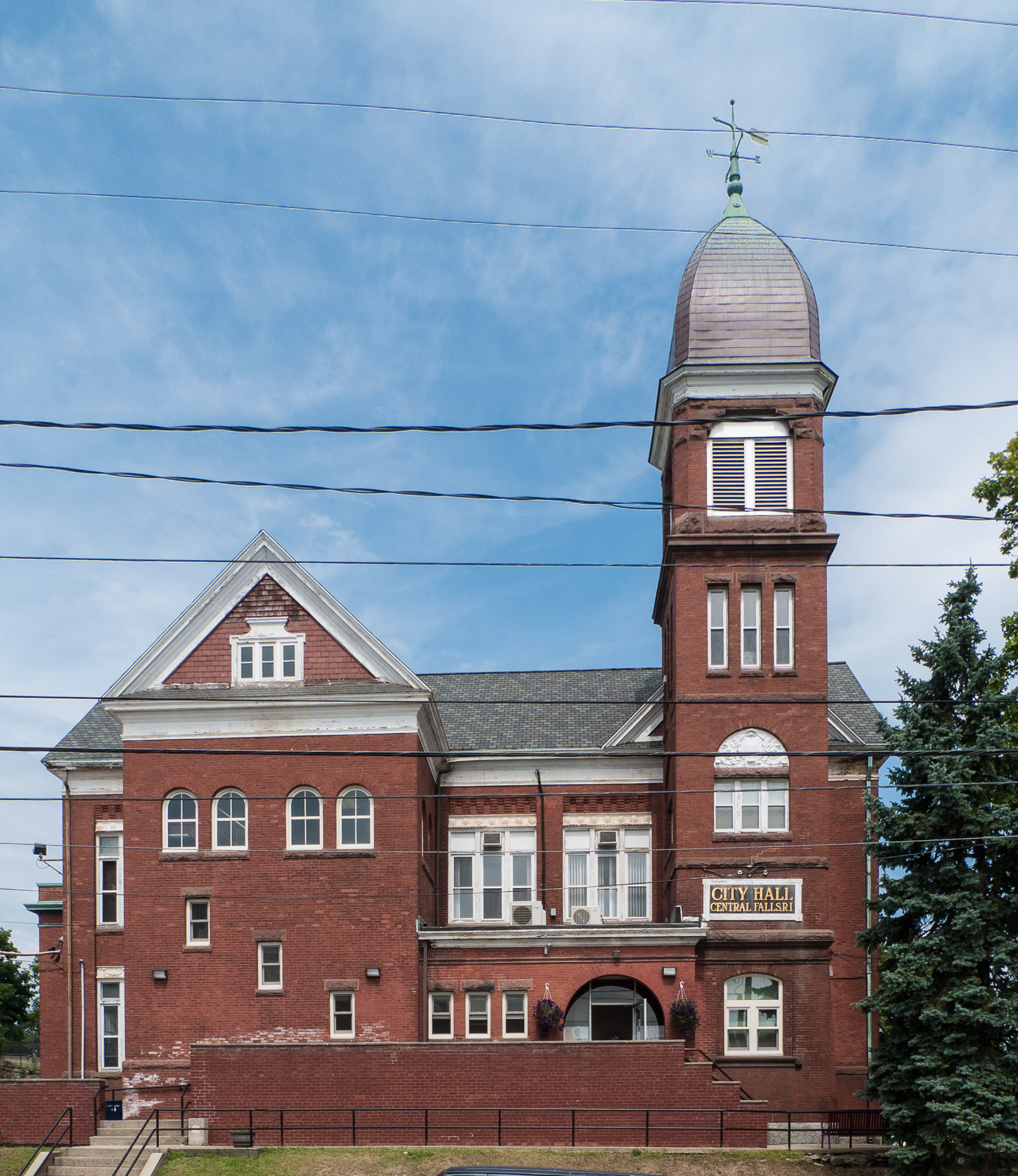
Central Falls City Hall

In the Rhode Island Senate, Central Falls is in the 16th District, represented by Democrat Jonathan Acosta. At the federal level, Central Falls is a part of Rhode Island's 1st congressional district, represented by Democrat Gabe Amo.

The city has a mayor-council government led by Mayor Maria Rivera. The city council consists of five wards and is represented by Jonathan Acosta, Robert Ferri, Hugo Figueroa, Franklin Solano, and Jessica Vega.

The Pawtucket Water Supply Board owns and operates the water system.

=== Issues ===
In April 2010, the Providence Journal Bulletin ran an article detailing rampant fraud and corruption by Mayor Charles D. Moreau, outlining no-bid contracts and kickbacks from a high school friend, Michael G. Bouthillette, who was granted almost $2 million in overpriced property boarding fees. The article further states that Bouthillette gave him a $6,875 furnace for his home for only $6,000, which Moreau said he paid in cash. Bouthillette was a donor to Moreau's multiple reelection campaigns. These allegations and others are being investigated by the Rhode Island State Police.

Central Falls's government's financial straits worsened in the 2000s as the state cut money to cities and towns, and pensions and pensioner health insurance for city employees accumulated to the extent that the city government declared insolvency in May 2010 and went into receivership. On August 1, 2011, Central Falls filed for bankruptcy under Chapter 9, Title 11 of the United States Code. It made the filing as it grappled with an $80 million unfunded pension and retiree health benefit liability that was over five times its annual budget of $17 million.

=== Presidential Election Voting ===
Like most other majority-minority urban municipalities, Central Falls is overwhelmingly Democratic in presidential elections. No Republican has come remotely close to winning the city in over three decades, during which time voters have consistently backed Democratic nominees with lopsided majorities. In 2020, however, Donald Trump won a massive increase in the vote, mirroring his performance in other majority-Hispanic areas. Despite this, Joe Biden still won by an overwhelming percentage.

Central Falls city vote by party in presidential elections
Year	GOP	DEM	Others
2024	34.3% 1,265	63.4% 2,335	2.3% 84
2020	26.05% 1,113	71.93% 3,073	2.02% 86
2016	15.51% 657	80.12% 3,394	4.37% 185
2012	12.89% 512	85.87% 3,410	1.23% 49
2008	16.97% 661	81.95% 3,191	1.08% 42
2004	23.05% 807	75.61% 2,647	1.34% 47
2000	17.57% 611	79.07% 2,750	3.36% 117
1996	13.68% 486	76.75% 2,727	9.57% 340
1992	23.39% 955	55.57% 2,269	21.04% 859
1988	33.36% 1,493	66.24% 2,964	0.40% 18

== National historic places in Central Falls ==
- Central Falls Congregational Church
- Central Falls Mill Historic District
- Central Street School
- Samuel B. Conant House
- David G. Fales House
- Benjamin F. Greene House
- Holy Trinity Church
- Jenks Park & Cogswell Tower
- South Central Falls Historic District
- St. Joseph Church
- St. Matthew Church (now Holy Spirit Parish)
- Valley Falls Mill
- Valley Falls Mill, Office and Bath House

== Notable people ==
- Lincoln Carter Almond, 72nd governor of Rhode Island; grew up in Central Falls
- Michael Breault, game designer, editor and author; born in Central Falls
- Malcolm Greene Chace, financier, head of Berkshire Fine Spinning Associates; born in Central Falls
- Francis Condon, US congressman representing Rhode Island's 1st congressional district; born in Central Falls
- Viola Davis, Academy Award-winning actress; grew up in Central Falls
- James Diossa, politician, born in Central Falls
- Carl Russell Fish, historian and professor at the University of Wisconsin–Madison; born in Central Falls
- Roland Hemond, executive for several Major League Baseball teams; born in Central Falls
- Leon Stanislaw Jablecki, rocket scientist
- Jack McGee, aviation pioneer; born in Central Falls
- Glyn O'Malley, playwright; grew up in Central Falls
- Charles Risk, US congressman representing Rhode Island's 1st congressional district; born in Central Falls
- Max Surkont, baseball player, Pittsburgh Pirates, Chicago White Sox and Boston Braves; born in Central Falls

== See also ==
- Valley Falls Company
- Lorenzo de Nevers
- Donald W. Wyatt Detention Facility
- Project Weber/RENEW
