= Lac-Normand =

- Unorganized territory
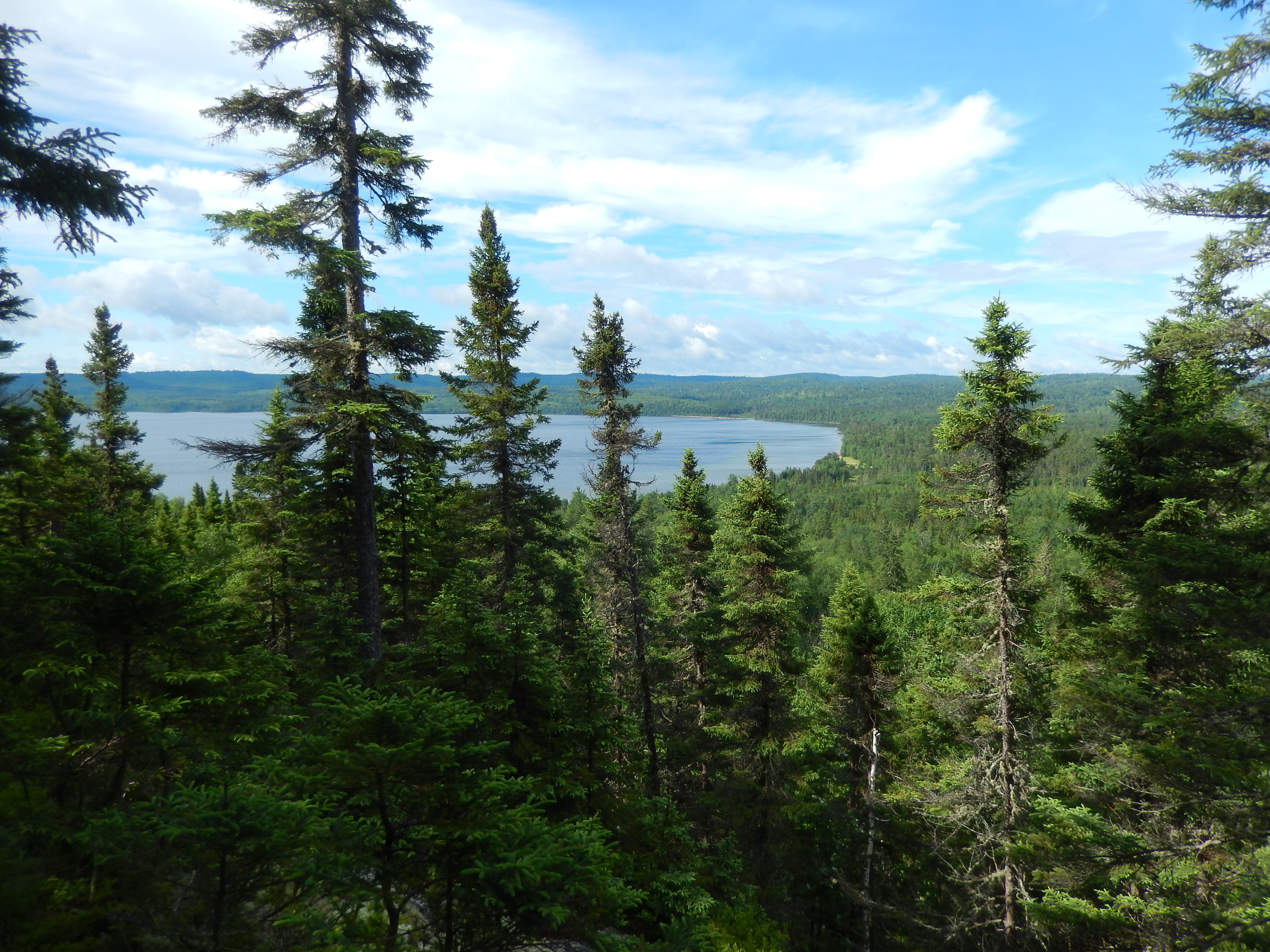

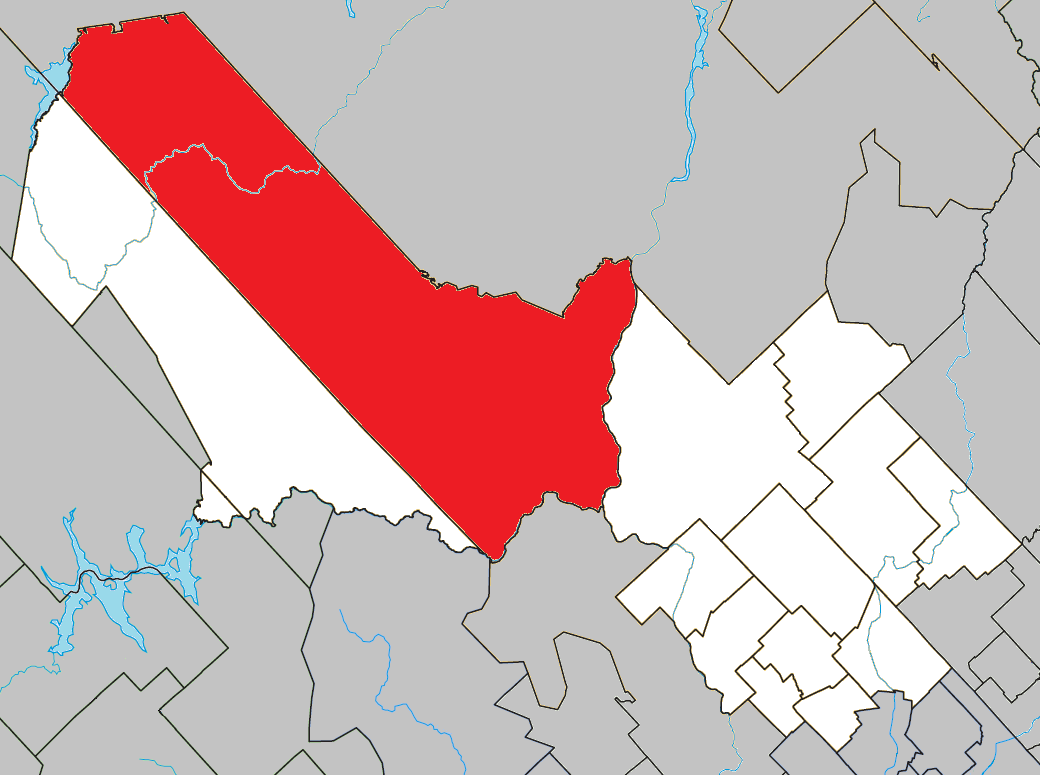
- Location within Mékinac Regional County Municipality

- Location in central Quebec
- Coordinates: 47°05′N 73°14′W
- Country: Canada
- Province: Quebec
- Region: Mauricie
- RCM: Mékinac
- Constituted: March 13, 1986

Government
  - Fed. riding: Saint-Maurice—Champlain
  - Prov. riding: Laviolette

Area
  - Total: 2,180.73 km^{2} (841.98 sq mi)
  - Land: 2,016.35 km^{2} (778.52 sq mi)

Population (2021)
  - Total: 10
  - Density: 0/km^{2} (0/sq mi)
  - Change 2016-21: ▲100%
  - Dwellings: 113
- Time zone: UTC−5 (EST)
  - Summer (DST): UTC−4 (EDT)
- Highways: No major routes

Lac-Normand (French pronunciation: [lak nɔʁmɑ̃]) is an unorganized territory in the Mauricie region of Quebec, Canada, part of the Mékinac Regional County Municipality.

Most of the territory of Lac-Normand is part of the Saint-Maurice Wildlife Reserve.

== Toponymy ==
Like many unorganized territories of Quebec, it is named after a body of water within its territory. The eponymous Lake Normand is located in the northwest part of the Saint-Maurice Wildlife Reserve. It is the largest lake within the reserve.

The name "Normand" was given in 1916 first to the geographic township in honour of Louis-Philippe Normand (1863-1928), physician and politician, who was mayor of Trois-Rivières and the first French-speaking president of the Medical Council of Canada.

== Geography ==
Lake Normand is located 55 kilometres (34 mi) north of Shawinigan and 70 kilometres (43 mi) south of La Tuque. The 2,038.04 square kilometres (786.89 sq mi) territory is located in the Mauricie region and Mékinac Regional County Municipality. This unorganized territory borders on:

- the cities of La Tuque and Shawinigan,
- the municipalities of Trois-Rives and Saint-Alexis-des-Monts and
- unorganized territories of Rivière-de-la-Savane and Baie-Obaoca.

The territory of Lac-Normand is entirely within the Laurentian Mountains. The rock is covered with glacial deposits over a large part of the territory. This area has the shape of a tall boot inclined at 45 degrees to the west, the tip heel toward south and toe to the east.

The entire territory is drained by the basin of the Saint-Maurice River, which also marks the boundary of the territory. Other rivers draining the area are the Matawin, Wessonneau, Livernois, and Vermillion rivers. The area is also dotted with many lakes.

== Demographics ==
Historical census populations – Lac-Normand
Year	Pop.	±%
1996	1	—
2001	0	−100.0%
2006	5	—
2011	5	+0.0%
2016	5	+0.0%
2021	10	+100.0%
2021 Population figure based on revised count. Source: Statistics Canada

== See also ==
- ZEC's partially within Lac-Normand:
  - Zec du Chapeau-de-Paille
  - Zec Wessonneau
  - Zec du Gros-Brochet
