= Goulet River (Vermillon River tributary) =

River in Mauricie, Quebec (Canada)

- Native name: Rivière Goulet (French)

Location
- Country: Canada
- Province: Quebec
- Region: Mauricie
- MRC: La Tuque

Physical characteristics
- Source: Gingras Lake
  - location: La Tuque
  - coordinates: 47.581105°N 73.744429°W
  - elevation: 485 m (1,591 ft)
- Mouth: Vermillon River
  - location: Lac-Normand
  - coordinates: 47.325269°N 73.73877°W
  - elevation: 368 m (1,207 ft)
- Length: 40 km (25 mi)

Basin features
- Progression: Vermillon River, Saint-Maurice River, St. Lawrence River
- Tributaries
  - left: (upstream) Décharge du lac Vison, Décharge des Lacs Désert et Shaw, décharge du lac Éloïse, décharge du lac Lightning, décharge du lac Kent.
  - right: (upstream) Décharge du lac Mou, décharge du lac Crystal, décharge des lacs Rebel, Tyro et Jake, décharge du lac Jacob, décharge du lac Gingras.

The Goulet River (in French: rivière Goulet) is a tributary of the Vermillon River, flowing on the west side of the Saint-Maurice River, in the administrative region of the Mauricie, in Quebec, in Canada. The course of this river crosses the territories of:

- La Tuque: canton of Frémont;
- Mékinac Regional County Municipality (MRC): unorganized territory of Lac-Normand: canton of Sincennes and canton of Dupuis.

The course of this river descends from the mountains entirely in a forest environment. Since the end of the 19th century, forestry has been the main economic activity in the Goulet River watershed.

== Geography ==
The Goulet river takes its source at the mouth of Gingras lake (length: 0.7 kilometres (0.43 mi); altitude: 485 kilometres (301 mi)) in the township of Frémont. This head lake is located in a mountainous area, on the west side of Creek Valley. This source is located at:

- 26.6 kilometres (16.5 mi) north of the confluence of the Goulet river;
- 65.3 kilometres (40.6 mi) north-east of the village center of Manawan;
- 75 kilometres (47 mi) west of downtown La Tuque.

From the mouth of Gingras Lake, the Goulet River flows on 38.8 kilometres (24.1 mi) in the following segments:

- 0.9 kilometres (0.56 mi) towards the south in the township of Frémont, to the outlet of Lake Kent (coming from the east);
- 3.8 kilometres (2.4 mi) towards the southwest, crossing Lake Louise (altitude: 438 kilometres (272 mi)) and collecting the water from the landfill (coming from the northwest) of the lac Jacob), to the northeast shore of lac Sam;
- 1.0 kilometre (0.62 mi) towards the southeast, crossing Sam Lake (altitude: 428 kilometres (266 mi));
- 3.6 kilometres (2.2 mi) towards the south, collecting the waters of the discharge (coming from the southeast) of Lightning Lake, to the limit of the township of Sincennes;
- 5.1 kilometres (3.2 mi) (or 1.0 kilometre (0.62 mi) in a direct line) towards the southeast in the township of Sincennes, bypassing the northern part of Canaple lake and winding up to the west shore of the north part of the latter lake;
- 4.2 kilometres (2.6 mi) towards the south-east, crossing Canaple Lake along its full length, to its mouth;
- 0.4 kilometres (0.25 mi) southeasterly, to the limit of the township of Dupuis;
- 7.2 kilometres (4.5 mi) towards the south, collecting water from the discharge (coming from the northeast) of Desert Lake, to the north shore of Jimmy Lake;
- 0.8 kilometres (0.50 mi) south, crossing Jimmy Lake (length: 1.2 kilometres (0.75 mi); altitude: 369 metres (1,211 ft)), to the dam located at its mouth;
- 1.5 kilometres (0.93 mi) towards the southwest, crossing Lac Léo (length: altitude: 369 metres (1,211 ft)), up to the limit of Lac Dupuis;
- 10.3 kilometres (6.4 mi) towards the south-east, crossing Lake Dupuis (length: 11.3 kilometres (7.0 mi); altitude: 369 metres (1,211 ft)), up to its mouth which constitutes the confluence of the Goulet River.

The Goulet River flows into a river curve on the north bank of the Vermillon River. This confluence is located in the township of Dupuis, in the unorganized territory of Lac-Normand, in the Mékinac Regional County Municipality. This confluence is located at:

- 79.4 kilometres (49.3 mi) southeast of the confluence of the Vermillon river;
- 51.9 kilometres (32.2 mi) east of the center of Manawan village;
- 19.7 kilometres (12.2 mi) to the north-west of the limit of the Saint-Maurice Wildlife Reserve.

== Toponymy ==
The toponym Goulet River was formalized on December 5, 1968, at the Commission de toponymie du Québec.

== See also ==
- List of rivers of Quebec
