= Windigo (disambiguation) =

Windigo or Wendigo is a half-beast creature that appears in Algonquian mythology.

Windigo or Wendigo may also refer to:

== Arts and entertainment ==
=== Film and television ===
- Wendigo (film), a 2001 American horror film
- The Wendigo (film), a 2022 American horror film
- "Wendigo" (Supernatural), an episode of the television series Supernatural

=== Literature ===
- Wendigo (comics), a fictional character in the Marvel Comics universe
- The Wendigo (novella), a 1910 horror novella by Algernon Blackwood

=== Music ===
- "Wendigo", a song on the Sharon Needles album, Taxidermy

== Places ==
=== Canada ===
- Windigo Lake (Ontario), a lake in Northern Ontario
- Windigo River, Quebec, flows into the Saint-Maurice River
- Rivière-Windigo, Quebec, a former unorganized territory that is now part of La Tuque, Quebec
- Windigo, Quebec, located near the Rapides-des-Coeurs Generating Station

=== United States ===
- Lake Windigo, a small lake on Star Island in Minnesota
- Windigo Lake, located in Sawyer County, Wisconsin
- Windigo, Michigan, an unincorporated community
- Windigo Ranger Station, a docking and refueling port on Isle Royale in Lake Superior

== Other uses ==
- Windigo First Nations Council, a non-political Chiefs Council in northwestern Ontario, Canada
- Splake, a hybrid trout also known as a wendigo
