= Wessonneau =

Wessonneau may refer to:

- Wessonneau River, a tributary of the Saint-Maurice River in La Tuque, Quebec, Canada
- Zec Wessonneau, a controlled harvesting zone in La Tuque, Quebec, Canada
- Rivière Wessonneau du Milieu, a tributary of the Wessonneau North River in La Tuque, Quebec, Canada
