= Flamand River =

- Native name: Rivière Flamand (French)

Location
- Country: Canada
- Province: Quebec
- Region: Mauricie

Physical characteristics
- Source: Discharge of lakes Vic and Yvonne
  - location: Zec Frémont
- Mouth: Reservoir Blanc, Saint-Maurice River
  - location: La Tuque
  - coordinates: 47°42′27″N 73°18′43″W
- Length: 55 km (34 mi)

Basin features
- Tributaries
  - left: Flamand Ouest River

The Flamand River (Flemish River, in English) is a tributary of the west bank of the Saint-Maurice River. It flows in the territory of La Tuque in Mauricie, in Quebec, in Canada.

== Geography ==
At it sources, the Flamand river is fed by the discharge of Lakes Vic and Yvonne, at the southeast of Zec Frémont, in the Laporte Township. The Fremont Lake, located in Zec Frémont is formed in length by a bulge in the Flamand river. In this area the Flamand River drains a catchment area between the watershed of the Manouane River (north) and the watershed of the Vermillion River (south).

The Flamand river runs straight north, then turn east for a segment of its course in parallel to the Little Flamand river which is close on the north side. Then the Flamand river veers to the southeast to its mouth. It follows a serpentine path about 55 km to the south -west part of Reservoir Blanc. The latter is artificially formed by the Rapide-Blanc Generating Station, built on the Saint-Maurice River.

== History ==
Enhancement of the Flemish river waters led to the total disappearance of the town of Flamingo and the valley in which the river flowed. The new body of water is referred to as "Reservoir Blanc".

== Toponymy ==
The name "Flamand river" was designated in 1829. This name refers to the name of a Canadian hunter. He lived for forty years in the community Atikamekw. This hunter "Flemish" practiced intensely hunting territory is now flooded.

The name "Flamand river" (Flemish river) was officially registered on December 5, 1968 the Bank of place names in Commission de toponymie du Québec (Geographical Names Board of Quebec).

== See also ==
=== See also ===
- Saint-Maurice River
- La Tuque
- La Tuque (urban agglomeration)
- Little Flamand River
- Reservoir Blanc (White reservoir)
- Zec Frémont
