= Cinconsine Lake =

Lake in Quebec, Canada

Lac Cinconsine
- Location within Quebec
- Location: La Tuque, Quebec
- Coordinates: 47°24′20″N 73°03′42″W
- Primary outflows: Cinconcine River leading to the Rivière aux Rats (La Tuque)
- Basin countries: Canada
- Max. length: 6.5 km (4.0 mi)
- Max. width: 3.2 km (2.0 mi)
- Max. depth: 99 m (325 ft)
- Settlements: La Tuque

The Cinconsine Lake is located on the west bank of the Saint-Maurice River in the territory of La Tuque, in Mauricie, in Quebec, in Canada. The area surrounding the lake is part of the northern part of the Zec Wessonneau.

== Geography ==
Cinconsine Lake has the shape of a boot with the tip pointing to the southeast towards the hamlet of "Rivière-aux-Rats (La Tuque)", located on the eastern shore of Saint-Maurice River. The lake has a length of 6.5 km and 3.2 km wide. It is located 18 km (direct line) west of La Tuque and 21 km (direct line) northwest of the hamlet "Rivière-aux-Rats". Surrounded by mountains, this is located entirely in the forest environment. Annually, the surface of the lake is frozen from November to April. On the west side, the sub-watershed is that of Deveriche River (La Tuque) and the watershed of the Wessonneau River is on South.

Cinconsine Lake is surrounded by high mountains, whose peaks reach 400 m on the east side and also to the south-west. In northeast, the lake receives water from a long narrow valley with several lakes including: Grandmont, Tom and Franquet. While in the north-east, Cinconcine Lake receives water from the outlet of Lake Lachance. In the west side, it receives the waters of Lakes Baxter and Bordeleau. On the same side, a small river empties into Lake Sinuous which forms a nearly closed bay of Lake Cinconcine.

Cinconsine lake has an area of 1,272 hectares and a depth of 99 m. The lake surface is at an elevation of 244 m (or 801 feet) above sea level. Contact dam: latitude: 47° 22' 36.4" (47.3768°) north; longitude: 73° 01' 42" (73.0283°) west.

Cinconsine dam

Cinconsine dam is located at the mouth on the south side of the lake. The outlet of the lake is designated "Cinconsine Creek" by Commission de toponymie du Québec (Geographical Names Board of Québec), which goes south on 5.5 km (including one kilometer across Boulanger Lake). After crossing the dam, water accumulates into the small lake Napinu, which discharges to the south to "Lac Miroir" (Mirror Lake). The first segment of the river, between the dam and the lake Cinconcine Boulanger Lake, is 2.5 km. The distance between Boulanger Lake and the Rivière aux Rats (La Tuque) is 2 km. The coordinates of the mouth are: latitude: 47° 22'37"; longitude: 73° 01' 44".

In order to reach the west side of the Cinconcine lake by road from Quebec Route 155 (located east of Saint-Maurice River), it is required to cross the bridge in the hamlet of Rivière-aux-Rats (Mauricie), which spans the Saint-Maurice River. Then continue on the forest road to the northwest along the Rivière aux Rats (La Tuque) 25.4 km; then take a right fork on about 9 km, along Cinconcine River.

== See also ==
- Saint-Maurice River
- Rivière aux Rats (La Tuque)
- La Tuque
- Mauricie
- Zec Wessonneau
