= Rivière du Milieu =

Rivière du Milieu ('River of the middle') may refer to:

- Rivière du Milieu (Normandin River tributary), a tributary of Poutrincourt Lake in Lac-Ashuapmushuan, Quebec, Canada
- Rivière du Milieu (Launière River tributary), Lac-Jacques-Cartier, Quebec, Canada
- Rivière du milieu (Mékinac), Lac-Masketsi, Quebec, Canada
- Rivière du Milieu (lac de la Belle Rivière), Belle-Rivière, Quebec, Canada
- Rivière du Milieu (Lanaudière), Baie-de-la-Bouteille, MRC Matawinie, Lanaudière, Quebec, Canada

== See also ==
- Rivière aux Écorces du Milieu, Lac-Jacques-Cartier, Quebec, Canada
- Rivière Noire du Milieu, Mont-Élie, Quebec, Canada
- Rivière Pierriche du Milieu, La Tuque, Mauricie, Quebec, Canada
- Rivière Port-Daniel du Milieu, Port-Daniel–Gascons, MRC Le Rocher-Percé, Gaspésie–Îles-de-la-Madeleine, Quebec, Canada
- Rivière Wessonneau du Milieu, La Tuque, Mauricie, Quebec, Canada
