= Zec Frémont =

- Location within Quebec
- Location: Mauricie, Quebec, Canada
- Nearest city: La Tuque, Quebec
- Coordinates: 47°35′N 73°43′W
- Area: 601 square kilometres (232 sq mi)
- Established: 1978
- Governing body: Association de chasse et pêche Frémont (Association of Hunting and Fish Frémont)

The ZEC Frémont is a "zone d'exploitation contrôlée" (controlled harvesting area) (ZEC) located in administrative region of Mauricie, in Quebec, in Canada. This public hunting and fishing area is managed by the "Association de chasse et pêche Frémont" (Association of Fish and Game Frémont). Zec Frémont was established in 1978 as part of the abolition of private clubs by the Government of Québec.

== Territory ==
Zec Fremont is located entirely in forest areas in the territory of the city of La Tuque west of Saint-Maurice River. It shares its boundaries with the Zec du Gros-Brochet to the south. The Zec is an area of 601 km^{2}. This territory houses 250 lakes (85 are used for fishing) and two rivers also used for fishing

The main lake in the Zec is Sincennes Lake, located southwest of the territory of the Zec. The other lakes are Wilfred, Mansfield, Seal and Frémont. The latter is formed while length by a bulge in the Flamand River which runs north at first, then west to empty in the Réservoir Blanc, on Saint-Maurice River.

== Toponymy ==
The toponym "Zec Frémont" borrows the name of the canton (township) and the lake of the same name, which are included in its territory. These three names pay homage to Jules-Joseph-Taschereau Frémont (1855-1902), a lawyer admitted to the Barreau du Québec in 1878 and Doctor of Laws (1887) and professor of this discipline to the Université Laval.
