= Rivière Wessonneau du Milieu =

- Location within Quebec

Location
- Country: Canada
- Province: Quebec
- Region: Mauricie
- Ville: La Tuque

Physical characteristics
- Source: Lake Utikuma
  - location: La Tuque
  - coordinates: 47°16′05″N 73°22′57″W
  - elevation: 467 m (1,532 ft)
- Mouth: Wessonneau North River
  - location: La Tuque
  - coordinates: 47°12′18″N 73°01′47″W
  - elevation: 208 m (682 ft)
- Length: 39.1 km (24.3 mi)

Basin features
- Progression: Wessonneau North River, Wessonneau River, Saint-Maurice River, Saint Lawrence River
- Tributaries
  - left: (upstream) Campbell stream, outlet of Lake Mérède
  - right: (upstream) Discharge from an unnamed lake, Wessonneau South River, Ruisseau Dickie, discharge from an unnamed lake, discharge from Gros Élan lake, discharge from Fourches lake

The rivière Wessonneau du Milieu ('Wessonneau of the Middle River") is a tributary of the Wessonneau North River, in the town of La Tuque, in the region of Mauricie, in the province of Quebec, in Canada.

Since the middle of the 19th century, forestry has been the main economic activity in this sector. In the 20th century, recreational and tourist activities have been highlighted, because the territory has been integrated into the zec Wessonneau. Some forest roads serve this valley for forestry and recreational tourism purposes.

The water surface is normally frozen from the beginning of December to the end of March; however, safe traffic on the ice is usually from mid-December to the middle of March.

== Geography ==
The Wessonneau du Milieu river is located to the west of the Saint-Maurice River, to the south of the rivière aux Rats and to the northwest of the Wessonneau River. The neighboring watersheds of the Wessonneau du Milieu River are:

- to the north: the Wessonneau North river
- in the south: Dickie stream and the Livernois River.

In its course, the Wessonneau du Milieu crosses several lakes, in particular: Montreal, Nelson, Thomas (neighbor of Lac Sauvageau), Lac Geoffrion, a small unnamed lake, Lac Ann, and Charlemagne.

Course from head (segment of 12.2 km (7.6 mi))

Lake Utikuma (diameter of 310 m (1,020 ft); altitude of 467 m (1,532 ft) and) constitutes the head of the Wessonneau du Milieu River. From its mouth, the river flows over:

- 1.3 km (0.81 mi) towards the northeast, where it collects a small stream; and
- 1.2 km (0.75 mi) east to flow into Lake Montreal (along 0.44 km (0.27 mi) oriented to the southeast; altitude of 425 m (1,394 ft)) that the current passes through.

The discharge from the latter lake descends on 110 m (360 ft) to flow to the southeast into Nelson Lake (1.1 km (0.68 mi) long, oriented to the southeast; altitude: 424 m (1,391 ft)) that the current crosses. After another discharge of 780 m (2,560 ft), the current flows through the western shore of Lake Thomas (1.6 km (0.99 mi) long; 425 m (1,394 ft) elevation) and paired with Lac Sauvageau. The river continues on 1.2 km (0.75 mi) eastward to flow into Lake Geoffrion (4.4 km (2.7 mi) long and 2.0 km (1.2 mi) wide; altitude: 423 m (1,388 ft)) which receives by:

- a bay in the northwest the waters of five lakes including Lake Oblong (altitude: 424 m (1,391 ft));
- the south side: the outlet of Lac du Sable (altitude: 449 m (1,473 ft));
- the south-eastern side: the discharge of three unnamed lakes; and four lakes including Lake Dempsey (altitude: 446 m (1,463 ft)).

Course downstream from Lake Geoffrion (11.3 km (7.0 mi))

The Wessonneau du Milieu river continues its course eastward on:

- 1.0 km (0.62 mi) east, to a small unnamed lake (altitude: 401 m (1,316 ft)), which the current crosses on 520 m (1,710 ft);
- 460 m (1,510 ft) eastward, to Lake Ann (altitude: 399 m (1,309 ft)), through which the current crosses on 440 m (1,440 ft);
- 3.7 km (2.3 mi) towards the south-east, up to the outlet of Lac des Fourches (altitude: 375 m (1,230 ft));
- 2.0 km (1.2 mi) east, to a small stream, coming from the north;
- 1.2 km (0.75 mi) towards the south-east, up to the outlet of three lakes including Merède lake (altitude: 371 m (1,217 ft));
- 1.0 km (0.62 mi) towards the south-east, to the outlet (coming from the south of Gros Élan lake (altitude: 431 m (1,414 ft)) which drains the water (on the south side ) the outlet of three lakes including Lac Baril, the outlet of two small lakes on the south side The mouth of Lac du Gros Élan is located at the eastern end;
- 150 m (490 ft) towards the south-east, until the outlet of a small unnamed lake (altitude: 370 m (1,210 ft)), coming from the north;
- 1.8 km (1.1 mi) towards the south-east, to Lake Charlemagne, which the current crosses from west to east on 800 m (2,600 ft).

Course downstream from Lake Charlemagne (segment of 15.6 km (9.7 mi))

The river continues to descend on:

- 1.8 km (1.1 mi) towards the south-east, in a strait which constitutes a widening of the river;
- 1.4 km (0.87 mi) east, to a stream coming from the north;
- 4.55 km (2.83 mi) (including 0.95 km (0.59 mi) east to a tiny lake; 1.4 km (0.87 mi) south-east; and 2.2 km (1.4 mi) south to the discharge of an unnamed lake, coming from the west);
- 0.5 km (0.31 mi) south to the outlet of Dickie Creek;
- 1.3 km (0.81 mi) southeasterly, to the outlet of the southern Wessonneau river;
- 1.2 km (0.75 mi) eastward; then the river branches off to the northeast;
- 2.4 km (1.5 mi) north-east, to a small stream coming from the west;
- 1.2 km (0.75 mi) northeasterly, up to Campbell Creek;
- 1.3 km (0.81 mi) eastward to its mouth which empties into the Wessonneau North River.

== Toponymy ==
The toponyms Lake Wessonneau, Rivière Wessonneau, Zec Wessonneau, Rivière Wessonneau du Milieu, River Wessonneau North and River Wessonneau South are interrelated, having the same origin.

The toponym Rivière Wessonneau du Milieu was made official on December 5, 1968, at the Bank of place names of the Commission de toponymie du Québec.

== See also ==
- List of rivers of Quebec
