= Rivière Pierriche du Milieu =

- Location within Quebec

Location
- Country: Canada
- Province: Quebec
- Region: Saguenay–Lac-Saint-Jean, Mauricie
- Regional County Municipality: Le Domaine-du-Roy Regional County Municipality, La Tuque

Physical characteristics
- Source: Unidentified lake
  - location: Lac-Ashuapmushuan
  - coordinates: 48°12′28″N 73°11′03″W
  - elevation: 428 m (1,404 ft)
- Mouth: Pierriche River
  - location: La Tuque
  - coordinates: 48°03′34″N 73°08′58″W
  - elevation: 0 m (0 ft)
- Length: 23.5 km (14.6 mi)

Basin features
- Progression: Pierriche River, Saint-Maurice River, Saint Lawrence River
- Tributaries
  - left: (upstream) Discharge from Lake Donald, discharge from Lac des Grosses Roches, discharge from Lac des Îles.
  - right: (upstream) Petits Lacs, discharge from Lac des Méchins, discharge from Beauté and Cliff lakes, discharge from Dionne and Surprise lakes, discharge from Lake Suzanne.

The Rivière Pierriche du Milieu ('Pierriche River of the Middle') is a tributary of the northwest shore of the Pierriche River, flowing in Quebec, Canada. This watercourse crosses the unorganized territory of Lac-Ashuapmushuan, in the Le Domaine-du-Roy Regional County Municipality, in the administrative region of Saguenay–Lac-Saint-Jean and the territory of La Tuque, in Mauricie.

This watercourse is part of the watershed of the Saint-Maurice River which flows at Trois-Rivières on the north shore of the Saint Lawrence River.

The economic activity of the Pierriche du Milieu river basin is forestry and recreational tourism activities. The course of the river flows entirely in forest areas. The surface of the river is generally frozen from mid-December to the end of March.

== Geography ==
The Pierriche du Milieu river has its source at the mouth of an unnamed lake (length: 0.3 km (0.19 mi); altitude: 514 m (1,686 ft)), located in unorganized territory from Lac-Ashuapmushuan.

From the mouth of this unnamed lake, the Pierriche du Milieu river flows on 23.5 km (14.6 mi), in the following segments:

- 3.2 km (2.0 mi) south, to the north shore of Grand lac de l'Île;
- 1.3 km (0.81 mi) towards the south, crossing the Grand lac de l'Île (altitude: 485 m (1,591 ft));
- 1.8 km (1.1 mi) south, to a stream (coming from the north);
- 6.0 km (3.7 mi) towards the south, crossing Lake Seskimaka (altitude: 411 m (1,348 ft)) on 0.9 km (0.56 mi), until its mouth;
- 3.1 km (1.9 mi) towards the south, until the discharge of Les Petits Lacs (coming from the southwest);
- 7.1 km (4.4 mi) south, then southeast, to the forest road bridge;
- 1.0 km (0.62 mi) southeasterly, to the confluence of the river.

The Middle Pierriche river drains into a bend in the river on the northwest bank of the Pierriche River. This confluence is located at:

- 30.1 km (18.7 mi) north-west of Rapide-Blanc generating station;
- 20.4 km (12.7 mi) north of Reservoir Blanc;
- 76.3 km (47.4 mi) northwest of downtown La Tuque.

== Toponymy ==
The toponym Rivière Pierriche du Milieu was formalized on December 5, 1968, at the Commission de toponymie du Québec.

== See also ==
- List of rivers of Quebec
