= Coucoucache Indian Reserve No. 24 =

Coucoucache
- Native reserve
- Location within Central Quebec Location within Quebec
- Coordinates: 47°45′08″N 73°13′50″W
- Country: Canada
- Province: Quebec
- Region: Mauricie
- Census division: La Tuque
- Settled: 1823 (trading post)
- Founded: 1853 (reserve)
- Dissolved: January 2, 2010

Government
  - Chief: n/a
  - Federal riding: Saint-Maurice—Champlain
  - Prov. riding: Laviolette

Area
  - Land: 0.11 km^{2} (0.042 sq mi)

Population (2006)
  - Total: 0
  - Density: 0/km^{2} (0/sq mi)
- Time zone: UTC-5 (EST)
  - Summer (DST): UTC-4 (EDT)

Coucoucache (French pronunciation: [kukukaʃ]; officially designated as Coucoucache 24A) was a tiny First Nation reserve, in Cloutier Township, on the north shore of Reservoir Blanc on the Saint-Maurice River in the Mauricie region of Quebec, Canada. It belonged to the Atikamekw First Nation of Wemotaci but had no permanent population in recent decades.

The reserve was an enclave within the City of La Tuque, approximately 48 kilometres (30 mi) north-west of La Tuque's town centre, but it was dissolved on January 2, 2010, and added to the city.

== History ==
In 1806, explorer Jean-Baptiste Perrault reported on "the small Kôukôukache River that flows by a rocky mountain where there are 11 portages to get to the Grand Kôukôukache." This name came from the word kôkôkachi, meaning "owl". It was also the name of the former Coucoucache Lake, where the Hudson's Bay Company had maintained a trading post, called Coocoocache, since at least 1823 (closed circa 1913). Coucoucache Lake, part of a chain of lakes on the Saint-Maurice River, may have been named after a small mountain in the shape of an owl that was situated at the eastern end of the lake. However, legend has it that a fight developed between the Atikamekw and the Iroquois at this lake, and when the Atikamekw imitated an owl's cry, they sprung on the Iroquois and massacred them.

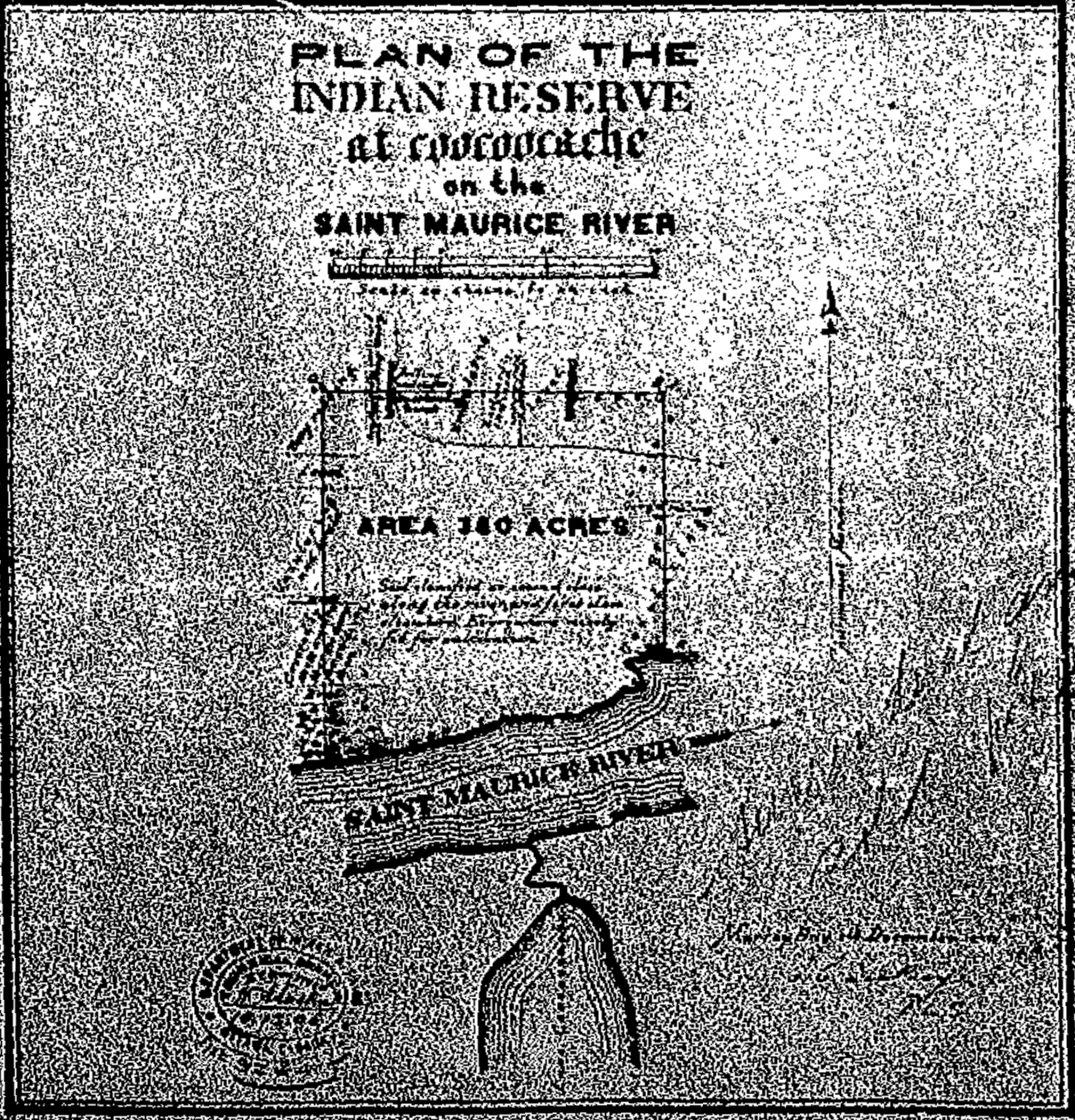
Plan of the Indian Reserve at Coocoocache on the Saint Maurice River

In 1851, the Government enacted the allotment of 230,000 acres (930 km^{2}) of land as reserves for the use and benefit of the "Indian" tribes residing in Lower Canada. Two years later, these lands were distributed among the Atikamekw, Algonquins, and Abenakis by John Rolph, Commissioner of Crown Lands. On August 9, 1853, the reserves, including Coucoucache, were approved by the Governor General in Council. In 1895, the original Coucoucache Reserve was surveyed and covered 380 acres (1.5 km^{2}).

In 1932, the Rapide-Blanc Dam was constructed, leading to the formation of the Reservoir Blanc that inundated Coucoucache Lake and Reserve. The new Coucoucache Reserve on the north shore of the reservoir replaced the old one but was only 12 acres (0.049 km^{2}) in size. For the loss of land, the Shawinigan Water & Power Company paid the Canadian government the amount of $380.

=== Land history ===
- 1851-08-30: Act of 1851, consisting of the setting aside of land not exceeding 93,080 hectares (230,000 acres) for the use of Indians.
- 1853-08-09: Order in Council, distribution of land set aside by the 1851 Act on the lands of La Tuque - Approximate Area: 5,666 hectares (14,000 acres).
- 1867-07-01: Act, 1867, jurisdiction of the Government of Canada on the Indians and lands reserved for Indians.
- 1895-12-05: Surveying land for Coucoucache, Canton Cloutier, Part undivided - Area: 153.78 hectares (380.0 acres).
- 1925-12-31: Act of 1925, reservation lands not exceeding 133,550 hectares (330,000 acres) for the benefit of Indians by the transfer of the usufruct.
- 1931-10-27: Surveying land for new Coucoucache, Canton Cloutier, Part undivided an area of 4.85 hectares (12.0 acres).
- 1932-01-16: Order in Council 93 transfer governance and administration of the Government of Quebec to Government of Canada. Township Cloutier, Part undivided. Area: 4.85 hectares (12.0 acres).
- 1937-12-01: Order in Council 2984, acceptance of transfer (1932) by Government of Canada. Surrender to Government of Quebec reserve Coucoucache (1851) under the Indian Act (RSC 1927, c. 98, art. 48).

Current situation:

- Canton Cloutier, Part undivided land acquired under the Act of 1925. Transfer governance and administration of Government of Quebec to Government of Canada by Order in Council 93 (1932-01-16). Area: 4.85 hectares (12.0 acres)

== Demographics ==
Population trend:

- Population in 2006: 0
- Population in 2001: 0
- Population in 1996: 0
- Population in 1991: 0

== See also ==
- La Tuque (urban agglomeration)
- Rapides-des-Coeurs Generating Station
