= Rivière aux Rats (La Tuque) =

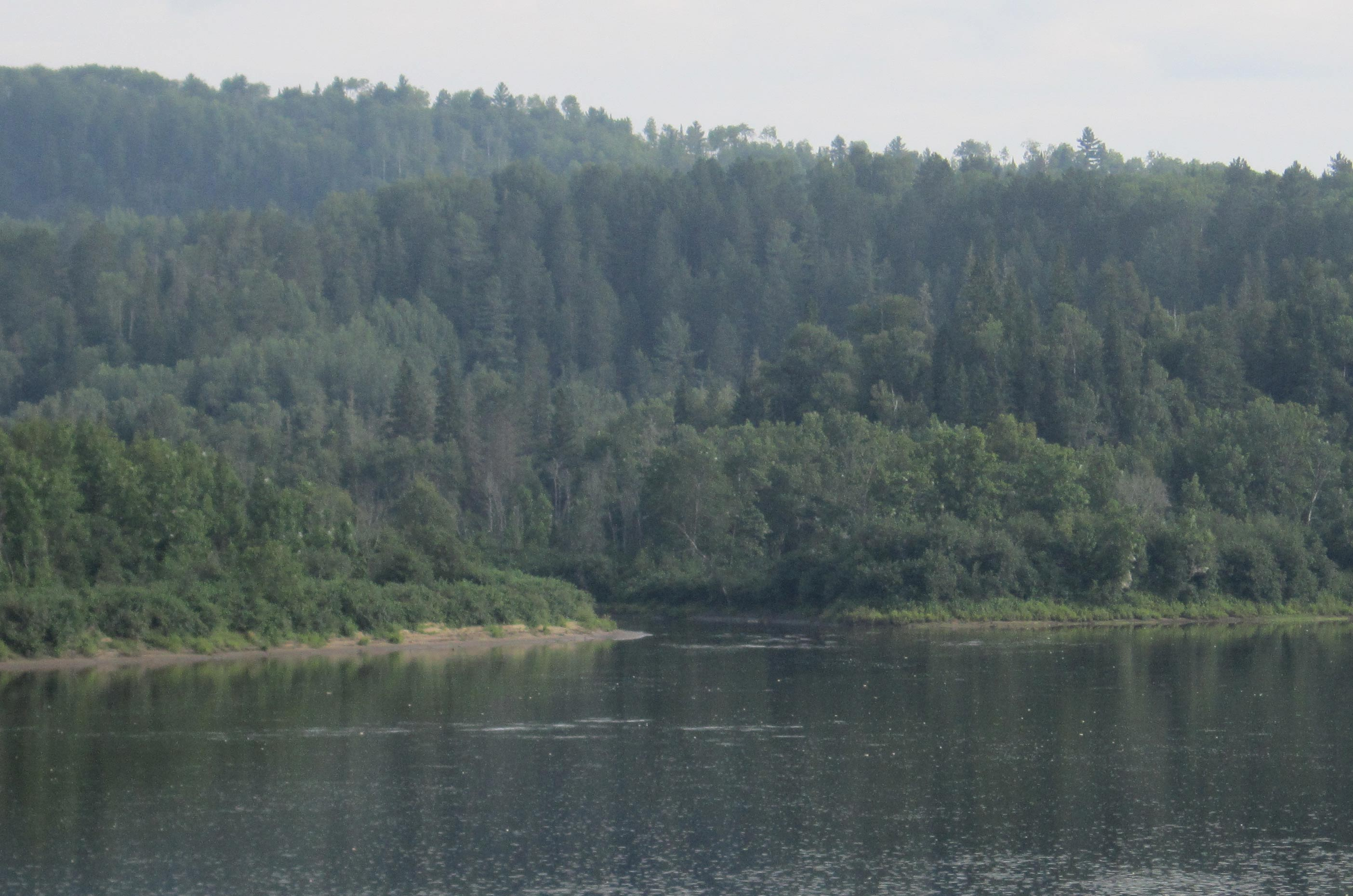

Location
- Country: Canada
- Province: Quebec
- Region: Mauricie

Physical characteristics
- Mouth: Saint-Maurice River
  - location: La Tuque (urban agglomeration)
  - coordinates: 47°13′12″N 72°53′26″W
- Length: 60 km (37 mi)

The Rivière aux Rats (Rat River, in English) flows south-east for about 60 km, in forested areas in La Tuque (urban agglomeration) (former MRC du Haut-Saint-Maurice) in Mauricie, in Quebec, in Canada. Its mouth is located at the opposite bank of the “Rivière-aux-Rats” hamlet (Rat River hamlet), which is on the east side of Saint-Maurice River, at 29.5 km (by Route 155) south of Downtown La Tuque

== Geography ==
“Rivière aux rats” is a tributary of the Saint-Maurice River, by the west bank, and its mouth is 500 metres upstream from the road bridge of “Rivière-aux-rats”, spanning the Saint-Maurice River and one kilometer upstream from the mouth of the Wessonneau River which flows northeast. “Rivière aux rats” flows mainly in the territory of the Zec Wessonneau.

The source of the “Rivière aux rats” is the area near the Vermillion River (southeast bank), comprising the discharge of lakes Nathalie, Blazer and “Lac aux rats” (Rat lake). In its course, the river receive waters from the “Petite rivière aux rats” (Little Rats River) which drains the lakes Pierre-Antoine, the “Petit Lac aux Rats" and Moose Lake. From this junction, the river often flows in coils, heading first to the south, then to the southeast. A forest road goes along the river from the south or west side, according to the segments of the river. Another discharge flows into the “Rivière aux rats” from the lakes Cinconcine and Dumoulin, located north of the “Rivière aux rats”.

== History ==
From the seventeenth century through the establishment at the mouth of a trading post by Hudson's Bay, Rivière aux rats was a preferred method of communication for trafficking in furs for the area between the rivers Saint-Maurice and Vermillion River. This trading post was in service until the mid-nineteenth century.

In 1806, Jean-Baptiste Perrault, traveling merchant, mentions the "Fort of the Rivière aux rats" in his writings. Journals of the House of Assembly of Lower Canada, 1823–1824, quote Francis Verreault: "... there is a station established at a place called Utsasht-ushipi (Rivière aux rats)". From the mid-nineteenth century, following the granting of rights to cut timber on public lands, many forest projects were implemented by loggers, near the "Rivière aux rats".

In 1887, John Baptist, who owned much of the forest concessions, managed to develop a large farm on the grounds of alluvium from the mouth. This farm used to supply the logging sites. During this period, the village of "Rivière-aux-Rats" grew on the eastern shore of Saint-Maurice, in front of the Baptist farm. Various hamlets along the Saint-Maurice River developed on the east shore, because of the coastal road linking Grand-Mère to La Tuque.

In the 19th century, the services of the Catholic religion with the various tasks of the Middle and Upper Mauricie were generally provided by members of the clergy assigned to Saint-Tite. In addition, forest contractors and workers could generally buy from traders Saint-Tite, Saint-Stanislas, Saint-Narcisse and Sainte-Geneviève-de-Batiscan.

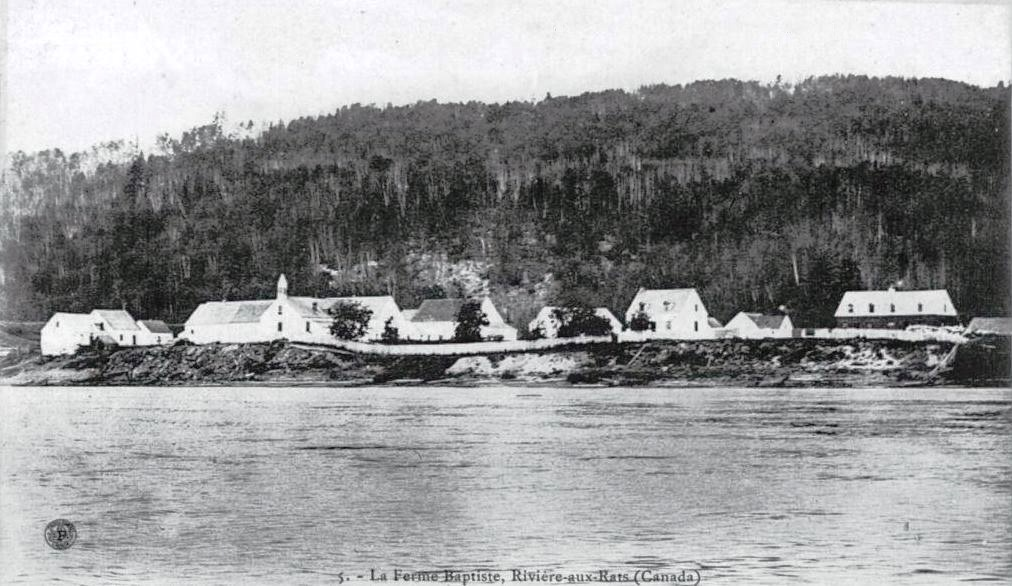
Baptist's Farm

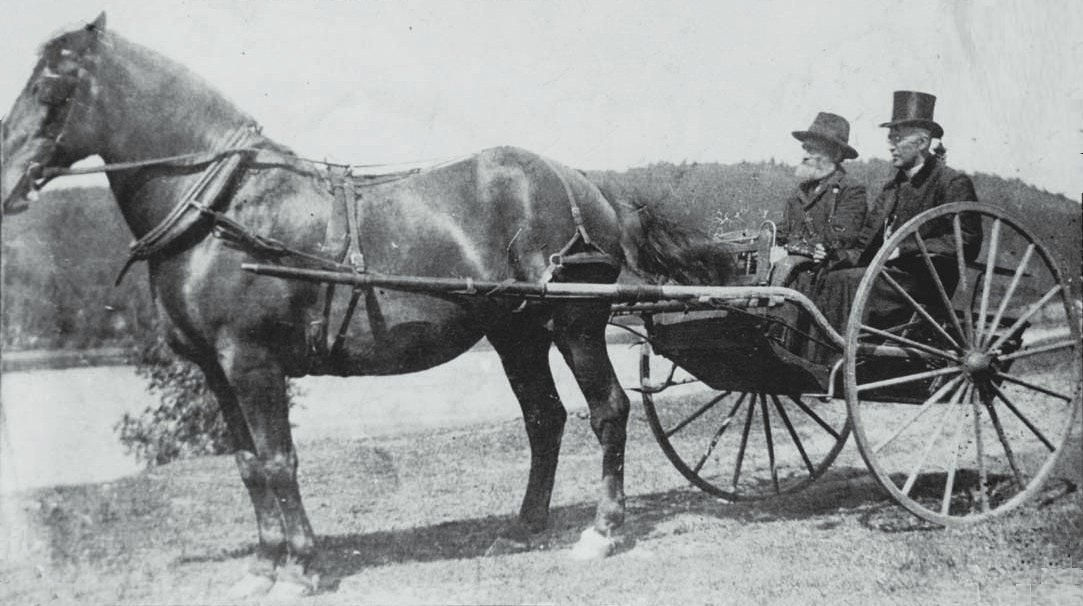
O. Dontigny and Bishop Cloutier

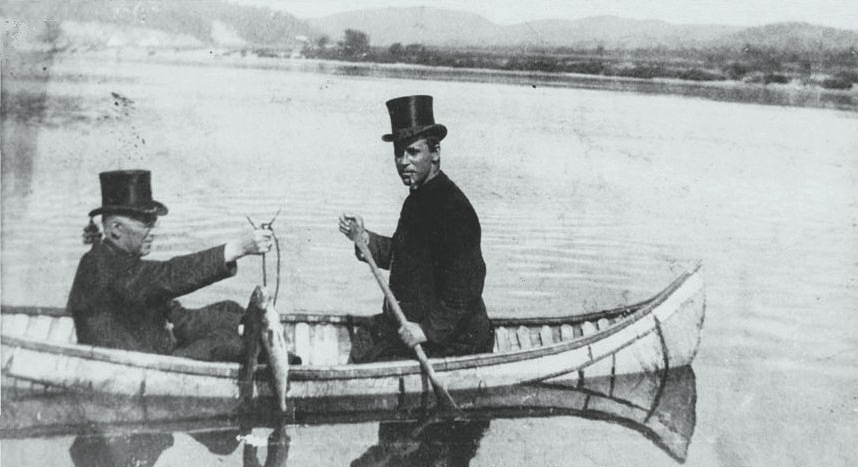
Bishop Cloutier and Paul Lamy

In 1910, under the auspices of Bishop Cloutier, Bishop of Trois-Rivières, a Catholic mission was founded in "Rivière-aux-Rats" under the patronage of "Saint-Jean-Baptiste" (St. John the Baptist). This canonical designation honors simultaneously French Canadians and also the oldest inhabitant of the place, Jean-Baptiste Hennesse.

Forestry companies maintained logging camps in operation near the mouth of the "Rivière aux rats" until 1984. The ferry connecting the two banks of Saint-Maurice River was in operation until 1980, before the construction of the bridge over the Saint-Maurice River.

Located on the Rivière aux Rats, the "Jetée déboulante Dickey" (Dickey Tumble Down Pier) was named in honor of Jimmie Dickey. The latter worked as a "foreman" in the forest sites; he was the Adams' brother-in-law. The term "Dickey" is also used for "Dickey's Cove", "Dickey's Lake" and this pier. It is about a jetty where the logs were pushed by loggers to make it tumble down a mountain.

== Toponymy ==
The term “Rats” refers to muskrats, whose population was once abundant in Mauricie. Some Canadian censuses of the 19th century included statistics regarding the number of captured muskrats in each family. The Abenaki designated the river “Moskwastekw” (River muskrats). Finally, the French version of the designation prevailed in popular usage.

The name “Rivière aux Rats» (Mauricie) was officially registered on December 5, 1968, in the Bank of place names of Commission de toponymie du Québec (Geographical Names Board of Québec)

== See also ==
=== See also ===
- La Tuque
- La Tuque (urban agglomeration)
- Saint-Maurice River
- Vermillion River
- Mauricie
