= Chute-Allard generating station =

Hydroelectric power station in Quebec

Chute-Allard dam
- Location within Canada
- Official name: Chute-Allard generating station
- Coordinates: 47°53′34.32″N 73°43′5.92″W
- Construction began: 2005
- Opening date: 2009; 17 years ago

Dam and spillways
- Height: 17.5 m (57 ft)

Power Station
- Commission date: 2008/2009
- Turbines: 6 x 10.3 MW Kaplan-type (Saxo)
- Installed capacity: 62 MW

The Chute-Allard generating station is a hydroelectric dam erected on the Saint-Maurice River by Hydro-Québec near Wemotaci, in the administrative region of Mauricie, in Quebec, in Canada. This plant, with an installed capacity of 62 MW and Rapides-des-Coeurs located downstream were put into service in 2008. Their construction was completed in 2009.

== Geography ==
The Chute-Allard generating station is located less than five kilometres downstream from the territory of Wemotaci and 4.5 km downstream from the Weymont railway station. The power plant was built at kilometre point 297.6 on a large island forming two arms of the river. The plant has been built in the north arm of the rapids.

Permanent access to the site is possible from La Tuque, by road 25 up to km 82; then a forest path leads on the right bank of the Saint-Maurice River near the downstream part of the fall-Allard.

In this sector, the Canadian National Railway, linking La Tuque and Senneterre, was built south of the Saint-Maurice River, except for a segment approximately of 12.5 kilometres built on the north shore. The railway crosses the Saint-Maurice River, by the railway bridge built at km 302.5 (at Wemotaci) and the one of 290 km, just upstream of the "Rapides de la Graisse (du Lièvre)". The CN Railway runs along the north shore of the water reservoir created by the hydroelectric dam at Chute-Allard. Small railway stations in the sector are: Ferguson (at km 267.5 km, 3.5 km upstream of Rapides-des-Coeurs), Vandry (at km 284), Dessane (at km 291) and Weymont (at km 301.5, near Wemotaci).

Between Chute-Allard and Rapides-des-Coeurs, small tributaries flowing into the Saint-Maurice River are:

- North Shore - the Rheaume Creek (located at 273.5 km on railway), which has its source in Lake Rheaume, at the west of Windigo River watershed;
- South Shore :

- Petite rivière Flamand (Small Flemish River) (its mouth is located just upstream of Rapides-des-Coeurs) which supplies water including lakes Mons, Lavoie, Liege, Brussels, Aro, Bob-Grant, Dinant, Simard, and several other lakes in the area of forest Road 25; - Ruisseau Démon (Creek demon).

Between these two hydroelectric stations, the main rapids are :

- "Rapides des Iroquois" (Iroquois Rapids), located between km 291.5 and km 292.5 (measured on railway);
- "Rapides de la Graisse (Le Lièvre)" (Rapids of the Fat) (Hare), located between km 287 to 290 (measured on railway).

Furthermore, "Rapides Weymont" (Rapids Weymont) (with an approximate length of 0.5 km) are located one kilometre south of the railway bridge in Wemotaci, or 4 km upstream from the plant Allard Falls.

The feed water upstream of Chute-Allard Generating Station and the tailrace downstream channel have been built along the north shore of Saint-Maurice River.

== History ==
In April 2005, the provincial and federal authorities have authorized the completion of the hydro-electric project Chute-Allard and Rapides-des-Coeurs Generating Station. The construction of facilities began the same year.

In 2008, the bays (channels) of the Chute Allard and Rapides des Coeurs were watered respectively from 6 to 9 May and August 4 to 22.

Commissioning of the latter group was held August 14, 2009 to the development of the Chute-Allard and 23 October 2009 in the Rapides-des-Coeurs. In 2009, a viewing area for visitors was arranged; it offers views of the reach upstream, central and air valves.

== See also ==
=== See also ===
- Rapides-des-Coeurs Generating Station
- Hydro-Quebec
- Hydropower
- Wemotaci
- Sanmaur
- Saint-Maurice River
- La Tuque, Quebec
