= Zec du Chapeau-de-Paille =

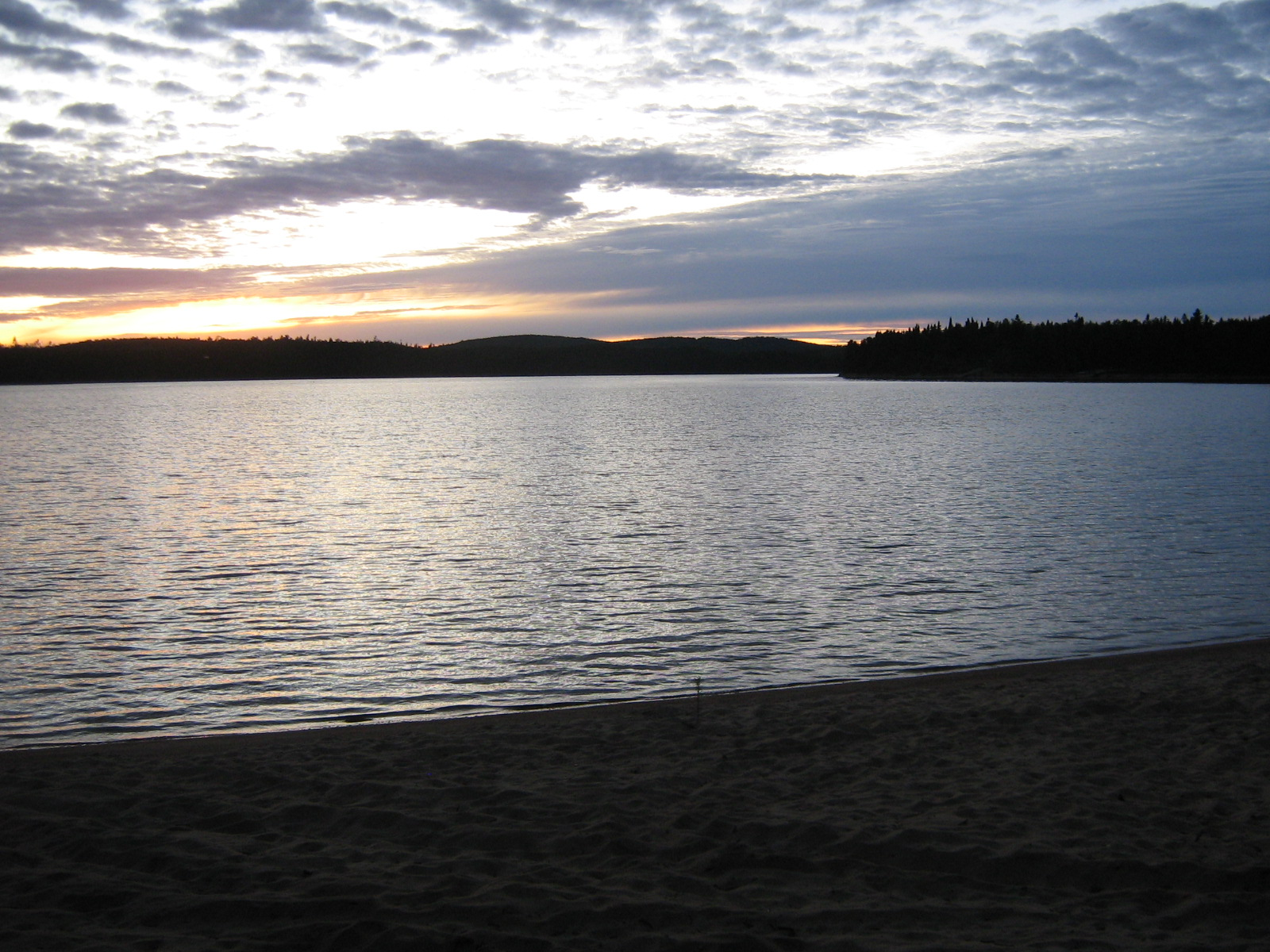
- At daybreak on "Lac des Aigles" (Lake of Eagles)

- Location within Quebec
- Location: La Tuque and Mékinac Regional County Municipality, Quebec, Canada
- Nearest city: La Tuque and Shawinigan
- Coordinates: 47°02′00″N 73°31′53″W
- Area: 1,270 square kilometres (490 sq mi)
- Established: 1978
- Governing body: Association Nature inc.

The ZEC Chapeau de Paille is a "zone d'exploitation contrôlée" (controlled harvesting zone) (zec), located in the Mekinac Regional County Municipality, in administrative region of Mauricie, in Quebec (Canada).

This Zec which was created in 1978, is administered by the Association Nature inc.

== Toponymy ==
The name of the hunting and fishing from Lake Chapeau de Paille to which the surrounding terrain remind the shape of the straw hat.

== Geography ==
ZEC Chapeau de Paille covers an area of 1,270 square kilometres (490 sq mi). It shares its boundaries with the Zec du Gros-Brochet at the north, Zec Wessonneau in northeast, Saint-Maurice Wildlife Reserve in the east, La Mauricie National Park southeast and Mastigouche Wildlife Reserve to the south. It also enclaves Ecological Reserve Irénée-Marie.

The territory of the Zec covers cantons (townships): Badeaux, Arcand, Lordship of Cap-de-la-Madeleine, Brehault, Livernois and Normand.

Lakes of the Zec subject to regulations on fishery by Government of Quebec are: Lakes des Aigles (Eagles lake), Bill, Bouchard, Bon-Air, Boulter, "de la Buse" (the Hawk), Cadotte, "à la chienne", "des Chaussées" (Roadways), Clara, "Grand lac du Couteau" (Grand Lake Knife), "de la Culbute Sud" (the South Somersault), Descoste, Descoteaux, Duff, "au Glacier", Godin, Hilda, Lafleur, Lessard, "à la ligne", Loa, Madelon, Montagne, Narrow, Grand Lake Pepin, Râteau (rake), Regis, Rusty, Ruth, Siffleux, Willard and Winfield.

== See also ==
=== Related articles ===
- Wessonneau River
- Saint-Maurice River
- Rivière aux Rats (La Tuque)
- Zec du Gros-Brochet
- Zec Wessonneau
- Saint-Maurice Wildlife Reserve
- La Mauricie National Park
- Mekinac Regional County Municipality
- Zone d'exploitation contrôlée (Controlled Harvesting Zone) (ZEC)
