= Windigo River =

Watercourse in Quebec, Canada

Coordinates: 47°46′37″N 73°19′21″W

The Windigo River runs in the unorganized territory of Lac-Ashuapmushuan, Quebec and in the territory of La Tuque, in Mauricie, in Quebec, in Canada.

== Geography ==
Windigo River flows from north to south in the forest, in the Laurentides in Upper-Mauricie, on a distance of nearly 100 km on the east side of Saint-Maurice River. Downward, the water passes through the unorganized territory of Lac-Ashuapmushuan, Quebec and the territory of La Tuque.

The watershed neighbors of Windigo River are:

- on the east side: that of the Jolie River (south) and that of the Pierriche River (north) including its tributary the River Pierriche west;
- on the west side: Saint-Maurice River.

Several small lakes are the headwaters of the Windigo River including: "lac de la hauteur" (Lake of Height) and "lac du Pigamon" (Lake Pigamon). Lakes heads are surrounded by mountains with peaks reaching up to 2150 feet. Coming down from the mountains, the water of the river pass through some lakes, including: l'Abbé (the Abbot), de l'Adiante (the Maidenhair), Wilfried, Windigo, Wageguma and Compass.

At 2.5 km before its mouth, Windigo river turns west. The river empties into the Reservoir Blanc in front of the hamlet "Windigo" (located on the west side of Saint-Maurice River). The Reservoir Blanc is an artificial enlargement of the Saint-Maurice River because of the dam Rapide-Blanc. The mouth of the Windigo River is at 6 km upstream of the bend of the Saint-Maurice River, located near the hamlet McTavish.

Tributaries of Windigo River

The main tributaries of the Windigo river are (from the mouth):

- West side: streams "Two and a Half Mile", "des Cinq milles" (Five Miles), Windigo River west, creeks Coulombe, Spartan streams, northwest Windigo River and Kennedy Creek;
- East side: streams Veillette, Doucet, Arsenault Creek, Wapposening, Bédard, "du Chasseur" (Hunter), Nastapolk, Hilda (from Lake Hilda) Cabeloga River and "Genévrier" (Juniper).

Windigo West River

Windigo West River joins the Windigo river at about 18 km (measured by its flow) from the mouth of the latter. Geographic coordinates of the mouth of the Windigo West River are: -73° 21' 52"; 47° 54' 26". The header Lake of the Windigo River West is Lake Relay. Going down the waters pass in north of Canton Rheaume (township) through, including: lakes Pikew, Usik, Niskekan and Benes lake (the latter is located 25 km (direct line) northwest of the mouth of the West River Windigo). The latter river flows prior to the southwest, and then branches off to the southeast. This river is harvesting waters south side streams "de la Grosse Île" (of the Big Island), Lajeunesse and Villeneuve. Windigo West River has several waterfalls and rapids, while collecting water from several lakes in wilderness.

Windigo Northwest River

The Jamme Lake (located in the unorganized territory of Lac-Ashuapmushuan) is the header Lake of the Windigo northwest river. This river is on south of Kennedy Creek watershed and flows south-east to go spilling into the Windigo River. Windigo northwest river drains water many lakes, including: Nancy, Iris, Julien, Round, Flow, "aux Grenouilles" (the Frogs), Noël (Christmas), "De la Boucane", Gros Buck and Partage.

== Toponymy ==
In his exploration of the territory, based from 1874 report, the surveyor Gideon Gagnon signals "Windigo River". The Railway Canadian National between La Tuque and Senneterre passes through the hamlet. The Postal Service has operated a post office Windigo between 1921 and 1964. In De Ker-Is in Quebec (1990), Fernand Grenier wrote that in Algonquin peoples and the Cree language, the Windigo (or Wendigo) is a powerful cannibal fabulous monster, giant, sometimes. Possessed by evil spirit, crazy, Windigo has to be slaughtered at the first opportunity. The same term is used when you want to settle down children: it is then a kind of bogeyman or fellow Sept Heures! In the Quebec language, "from the Windigo" usually means moving away in the woods, go to the sites or run the adventure in remote and often disreputable places".

The Abenaki denote the river Kiwakwazibo or the giant river and Attikameks know him as Witiko Sipi river monster. Variation: Hand.

According to the Commission de toponymie du Québec (Geographical Names Board of Quebec), 28 names Quebecois carry this designation notably "Rapids Windigo" on the Saint-Maurice River, located in the canton of Bourassa, within the limits of La Tuque, about 40 miles north of Weymontachie.

The name "Windigo River" was recorded on December 5, 1968, at the Bank of place names in the Commission de toponymie du Québec (Geographical Names Board of Québec).

== See also ==
=== Related articles ===
- Rivière-Windigo (unorganized territory), formerly unorganized territory until 2003
- Little River Pierriche
- Pierriche River
- Jolie River
- Saint-Maurice River
- Reservoir Blanc
- La Tuque
- La Tuque (urban agglomeration)
- Rapide-Blanc Generating Station
