= Rapide-Blanc generating station =

Hydroelectric power station in Quebec

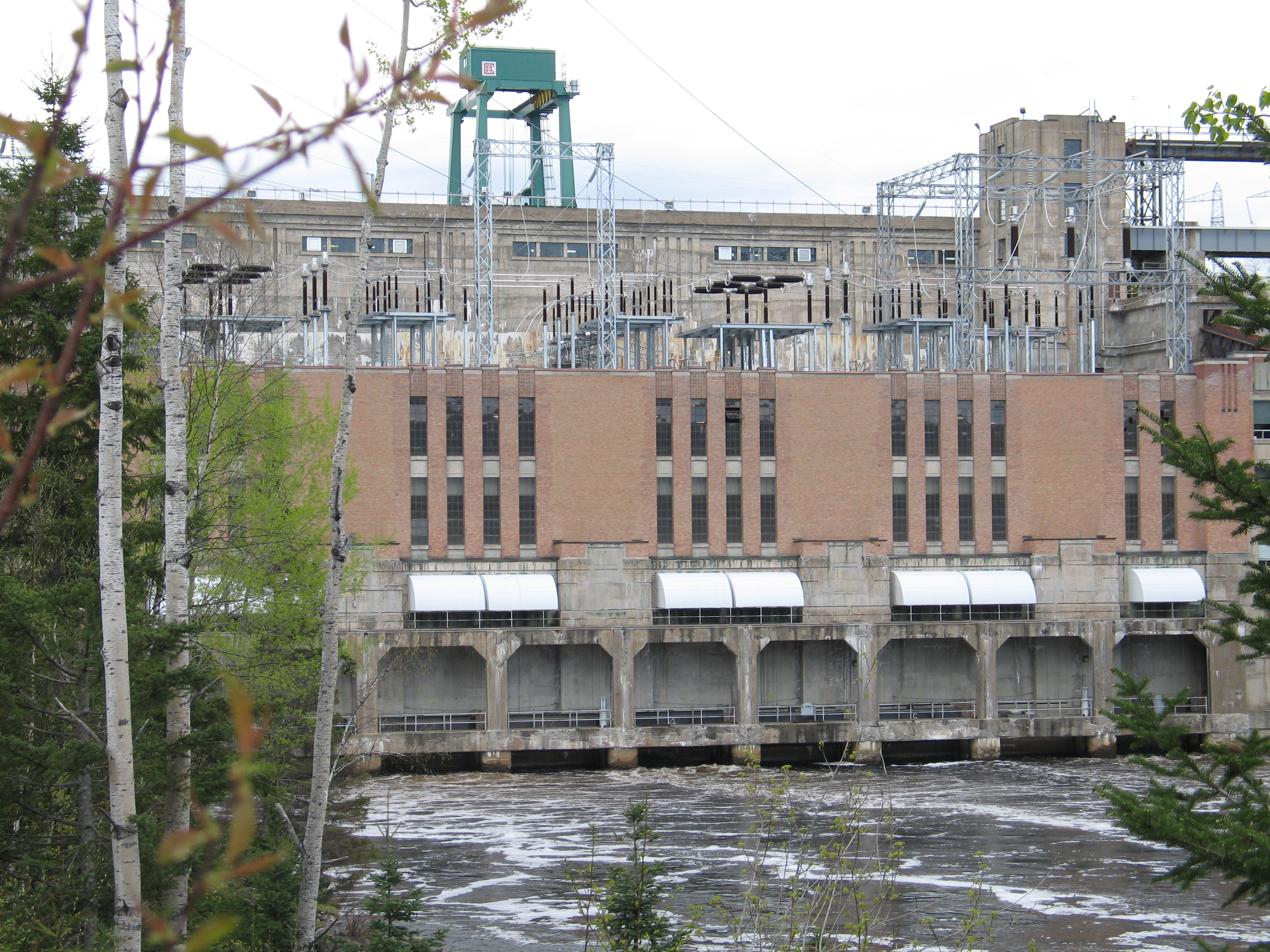
- Centrale hydroélectrique de Rapide-Blanc

- Location within Quebec
- Country: Canada
- Location: La Tuque, Quebec
- Coordinates: 47.79661°N 72.97342°W
- Purpose: Power
- Status: Operational
- Construction began: 1930
- Opening date: 1934; 92 years ago

Dam and spillways
- Height (foundation): 45 m (148 ft)
- Height (thalweg): 32.92 m (108.0 ft)
- Length: 268 m (879 ft)
- Width (crest): 7 m (23 ft)

Reservoir
- Total capacity: 466,000,000 m^{3} (378,000 acre⋅ft)
- Surface area: 8,200 ha (20,000 acres)
- Normal elevation: 279.8 m (918 ft)

Power Station
- Operator: Hydro-Québec
- Turbines: 6 x 34 MW Francis-type
- Installed capacity: 204 MW

The Rapide-Blanc generating station is a hydroelectric facility, comprising a reservoir, a dam and a hydroelectric plant. It is located on the Saint-Maurice River about sixty kilometres (37 mi) north of the city of La Tuque, in Quebec, in Canada. Built between 1930 and 1934 by the Shawinigan Water & Power Company (SWPC), it is the third hydroelectric facility on this river (from the source of the river). The plant has been operated by Hydro-Québec since it was acquired from the SWPC in 1963, as part of the nationalisation of electric power companies in Quebec. The plant has a rated power of 204 megawatts (274,000 hp).

== History ==
“Rapide-Blanc” (English: White Rapid) was deemed to be the most dangerous rapids of Saint-Maurice River. The Atikamekw preferred to use a series of 11 portages from Coucoucache to the mouth of the Vermillon River (La Tuque), upstream of La Trenche Generating Station, through the Coucoucache Creek.

This hydroelectric dam was built on the site of the former "Rapide Blanc" whose designation goes back to at least the mid-nineteenth century. After the construction of the dam, only one of the old rapids remains (downstream of the dam), designated in French "Rapides de la Tête du Rapide Blanc" (Rapids of the Head of White Rapids). The name "Rapide-Blanc" (White Rapid) was also given to the rail stop located 12 km south of the village.

In 1928, the SWPC acquired water rights on six of the seven sites that could be developed for power generation on the upper Saint-Maurice River, upstream of Grand-Mère. The company signed a long-term lease for using and developing the site during 75 years, to ensure it would retain the exclusivity of hydroelectric development on the whole basin. Under agreements with the Government of Quebec, the site of Rapide-Blanc, located 60 kilometres (37 mi) north of La Tuque was the first site due to be developed. However, the Great Depression of the 1930s forced the SWPC to revise its forecast of the growth of electricity demand downwards.

Under its agreement with the Government of Quebec, the SWPC had pledged to start construction of a facility with a minimum power rating of 75 MW (100,000 hp) by 1930, for a planned commissioning in 1933. The construction of a second unit was to follow in 1938. However, in light of the economic downturn and of the reduction in the revenue of the SWPC between 1930 and mid-1932, the company requested some changes to the lease, including its extension from 75 to 95 years. The Government agreed to change the terms, which delayed subsequent work.

Notwithstanding this, the SWPC nevertheless honoured the terms of the first agreement: the construction of gravity dams of 268 m (879 ft) started in 1930, as provided in the agreement signed two years before. The project was relatively complex for the time, and in particular required the movement of a 50 km (31 mi) section of the railway of Canadian National, which passed through the land due to be flooded by the reservoir of the plant. Another consequence was the displacement of Indian Reserve of Coucoucache whose lands were flooded by the Reservoir Blanc. A new reserve of 6 hectares (15 acres) was assigned by the Government of Quebec on 16 January 1932 replacing the old unit of 154 hectares (380 acres). Shawinigan reimbursed 380 U.S. dollars to the Canadian government on 1 January 1937 for the loss of the previous reserve.

Despite the difficult economic environment, the directors of the company had confidence in the project's profitability. According to the 1932 Annual Report of the SWPC, the unit cost of the first unit 120 MW (160,000 hp) power was estimated at less than US$100. The production cost was due to become lower after the installation of the last two generating units (the central being meant to accommodate six, with a combined capacity of 180 MW (240,000 hp)). And had been feared by the directors of the company, the power of this new plant, whose construction was completed in 1934, was not required before the outbreak of the World War II in 1939.

=== Plant expansion ===
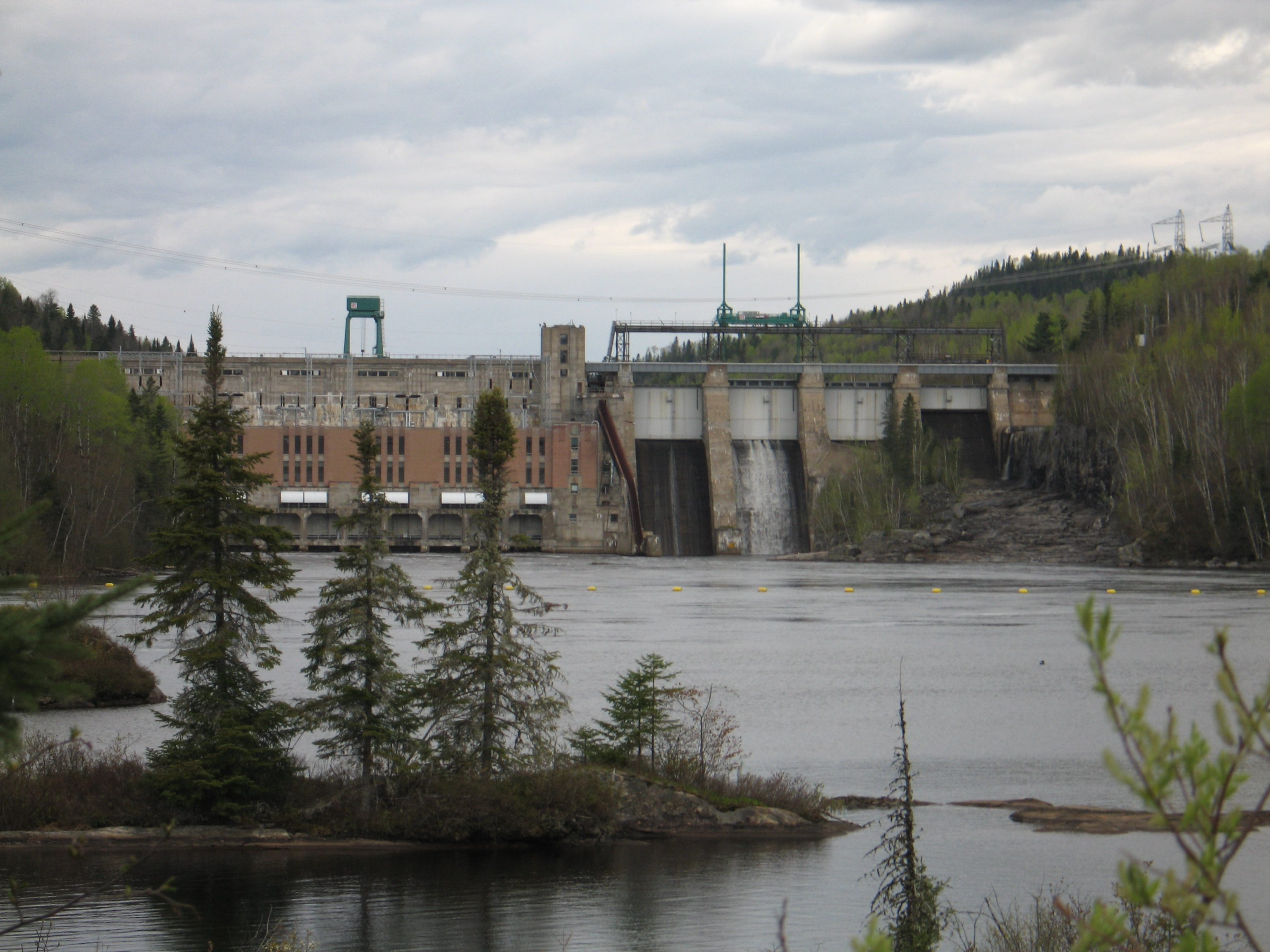
The production capacity of the plant was increased by the addition of a fifth unit in 1943 and sixth in 1955.

World War II causes a dramatic increase in electricity demand and the three main power grids of the time - those of Montreal Light, Heat and Power, of Alcan and of the SWPC - established new interconnections to optimise the production of electricity. A fifth turbine generator was added to the Rapide-Blank facility in 1943.

The war also forced the SWPC to question the safety of its installed works in Haute-Mauricie. The company established a messenger pigeon service, responsible for rapidly communicating information relating to the most remote dams in the event of air attack or sabotage of facilities and of the means of communication. The Shawinigan Journal, the internal newspaper of the SWPC, revealed in its November 1945 edition that company executives feared that a collapse of the Gouin dam could cause the destruction of downstream plants used to support the war effort.

As a result, from March 1942, dovecotes were set up Rapide-Blanc and Gouin. The best pigeons of the SWPC could make the trip between the two sites - 120 km (75 mi) apart as the crow flies - in 75 minutes, which represents an average speed of 100 km/h (62 mph).

Following the end of the war, and due to the creation of Hydro-Québec in 1944, the SWPC was confined to a smaller territory at a time where demand was rapidly increasing. To increase the installed capacity of the hydroelectric facilities on the Saint-Maurice River, the SWPC asked the government for permission to divert the headwaters of the Mégiscane River in Abitibi-Témiscamingue to the Gouin reservoir, whose mouth is located 164 km (102 mi) upstream from Rapide-Blanc. Despite opposition from Hydro-Québec engineers, the SWPC was ultimately given permission to partially divert the course of the Mégiscane River to increase the flow of the Saint-Maurice River in September 1951, just days after Hydro-Québec was granted permission to build two large dams, Bersimis-1 and Bersimis-2, on the Betsiamites River.

In parallel with this diversion, a sixth turbine generator was installed at each of La Tuque, La Trenche and the Rapide-Blanc. The decision to proceed with the works was taken in February 1953, and the new units were commissioned in 1955. The cost of these works, which added 110 megawatts (150,000 hp) to the peak power of the three plants, totaled C$14 million.

=== The Village of Rapide-Blanc ===
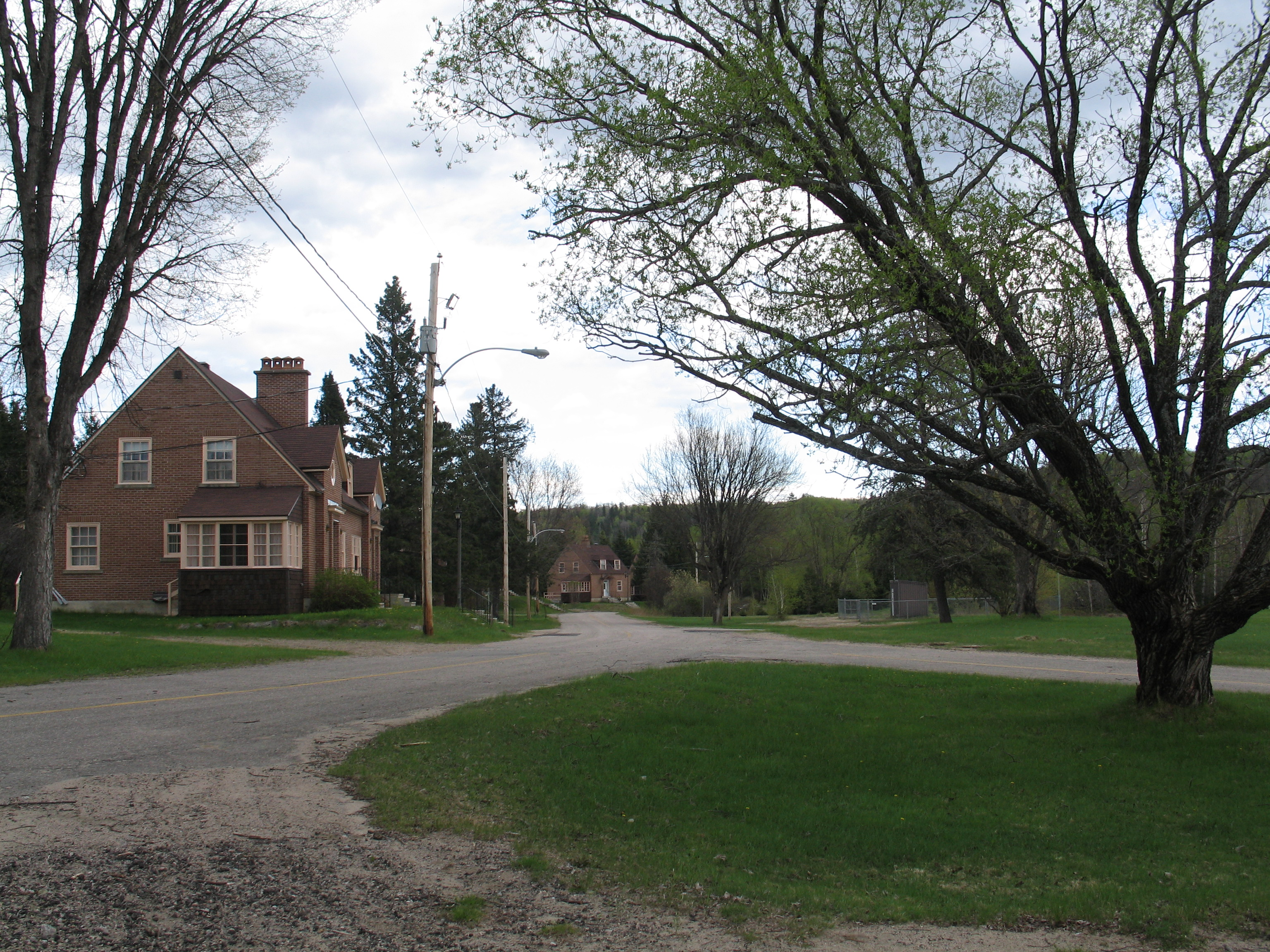
Some of the 7 houses of the old village of Rapide-Blanc, east of the plant. They are available to Hydro-Québec employees when passing.

From the 1930s, the SWPC built a village to house the workers responsible for the operation of the plant, as well as their families. A series of red brick houses were erected on the east bank of the river near the dam. The total population of the village has never exceeded 65 families.

Built on the model of English garden cities, the village had 42 single family homes, comfortable and heated by electricity. As in other remote Quebec communities Rapide-Blanc houses were owned by the plant operator, who leased the space to employees.

The village also had an inn of 13 rooms, an Elementary School which offered instruction in French and English, two churches (Catholic and Protestant), a General Store, a filtration plant and a medical clinic. Recreation facilities allowed for the practice of curling, ice hockey and skiing in winter, and tennis and softball in the summer. Before the construction of the La Trenche Generating Station, opened in 1950, the site was difficult to access, since workers were cut off from the road leading to La Tuque and to the rest of Quebec.

Technological advances in the 1960s led to the demise of the village. In 1969, the decision to control the plant remotely from La Tuque, about 60 kilometres (37 mi) downstream, was taken by Hydro-Québec, resulting in the village being dismantled in 1974, to the dismay of workers who spent their career there. Only 7 houses remain. Two of these are used by Hydro-Québec to hold meetings. The other five are available to Hydro-Québec employees, who can use them for holidays. The place is renowned for the quality of its fishing. The brook trout, the gold, the Northern pike and trout are the most frequently caught species in nearby lakes.

=== Automation ===
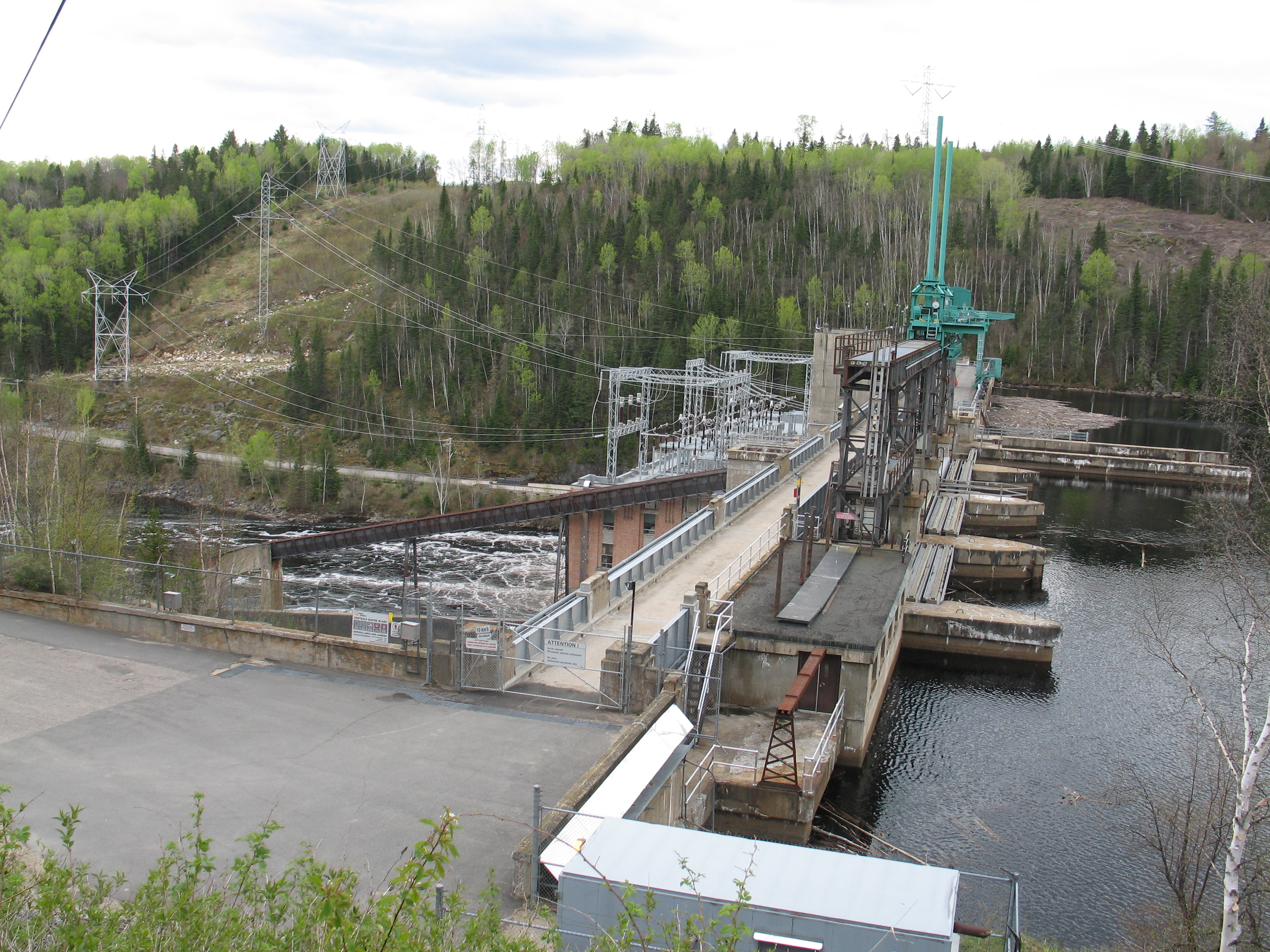
A substation is built on the roof of the plant. Top left is the single-circuit line 230 KV which connects the post Chute-Allard and Rapides-des-Coeurs (pylon-shaped cross) and the line that feeds the position of beeches in Shawinigan (rectangular towers).

Rapide-Blanc Generating Station was transferred to Hydro-Québec when the government-owned corporation took control of private power companies in 1963. In January 1969, Hydro-Québec announced the automation of its plants in the Haut-Saint-Maurice. The draft 2.5 million Canadian dollars, led to the transfer of 71 employees assigned to sites Rapide-Blanc and La Trenche Generating Station, and closing of the village of Rapide-Blanc, where 54 families and 240 people lived. The company then invoked the increased accessibility to the site, the preference of employees for life in an urban environment and annual savings of $C450,000 to justify the abandonment of the village.

The operation of the plant was automated by using a microwave network from the summer of 1971 and the plant is controlled from a station located in the downtown area of La Tuque. As of the early twenty-first century, there are only seven small houses that have been renovated and preserved.

Since automation, hydro development is visited weekly by a team of a dozen workers responsible for maintenance of the plant and the three auxiliary dams in Manowan. In 2006, the downtime of 0.86% was the lowest in the Cascades sector of Hydro-Québec. Nevertheless, the system, which celebrated its 75th anniversary in 2009, requires some attention; work was carried out on a valve spillway in summer 2006.

The power station installed on the roof of the plant was upgraded in 2007 to accommodate a new transmission line built at a cost of CA$104.5 million dollars. Sixty kilometres (37 mi) long and consisting of guyed towers, a line 230 kV delivers electricity to new Chute-Allard and Rapides-des-Coeurs, upstream, to the position of beeches in Shawinigan and the consumer markets of southern Quebec. Rapide-Blanc, an existing line goes south and shares a grip with the other lines which leave the other plants in the Haute-Mauricie and 450 kilovolt line to DC linking Radisson, near the central of James Bay to Nicolet on the south side of Saint Lawrence River, and thence to New England.

== See also ==
- List of hydroelectric stations in Quebec
- Shawinigan Water & Power Company
- History of Hydro-Québec
- La Tuque Generating Station
- Rapides-des-Coeurs Generating Station

== Bibliography ==
- Bellavance, Claude (1994). Shawinigan Water and Power (1898-1963) : Formation et déclin d'un groupe industriel au Québec [Shawinigan Water and Power (1898-1963): Establishment and decline of a Quebec industrial group] (in French). Montréal: Boréal. ISBN 2-89052-586-4.
- Blanchet, Pascal (2006). Rapide Blanc (in French). Montréal: La Pastèque. ISBN 978-2-922585-43-8.
- Dales, John H. (1957), Hydroelectricity and Industrial Development Quebec 1898-1940, Cambridge, Mass.: Harvard University Press.
