= The Wendigo (film) =

2022 American horror film

- Directed by: Jake Robinson
- Written by: Jamie Brown
- Produced by: Paul Hurley
- Starring: Matthias Margraves; Taylor Grace Davis; Hunter Redfern; Laura Rodriguez
- Cinematography: Jake Robinson
- Distributed by: Terror Films
- Release dates: October 28, 2022 (Exhibition of Evil); August 4, 2023
- Country: United States
- Language: English

The Wendigo is a 2022 American horror film directed by Jake Robinson. Shot in a found footage style, the film stars Tyler Whisnant, Matthias Margraves, Taylor Grace Davis, Hunter Redfern, Paul Hurley and Laura Rodriguez, and follows a group of social media influencers who set out to search for a fellow influencer who disappeared while investigating a lost Native American tribe in the woods of North Carolina.

The Wendigo premiered as part of the virtual Exhibition of Evil film festival on October 28, 2022. The film is slated for release on digital platforms on August 4, 2023.
