= Wessonneau River =

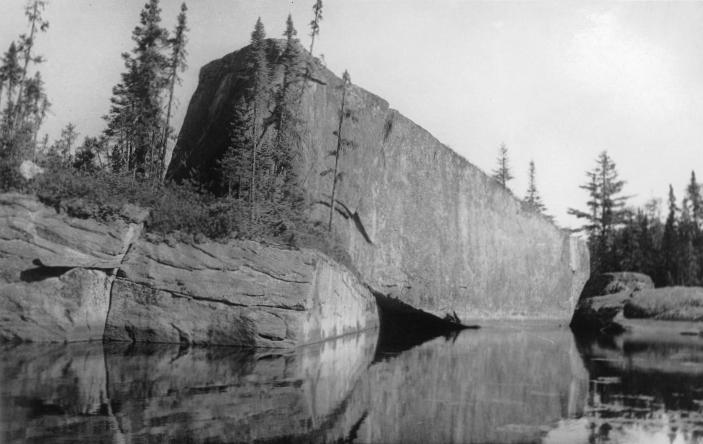
- The rock legend Steamboat on the river in the Saint-Maurice Wildlife Reserve

Location
- Country: Canada
- Province: Quebec
- Region: Mauricie

Physical characteristics
- Source
  - location: Zec Chapeau-de-Paille
- Mouth
  - location: Mauricie administrative region
  - coordinates: 47°12′46″N 72°53′59″W

The Wessonneau River flows north-east in the Mekinac Regional County Municipality in Mauricie, in Quebec, in Canada, on the west bank of the Saint-Maurice River. The watershed of the river is administered by:

- Zec Wessonneau for the northern part of the basin;
- Zec Chapeau-de-Paille and Zec du Gros-Brochet, which are located in the western part of the watershed;
- Wildlife Reserve of Saint-Maurice, south of the river Wessonneau.

== Geography ==
From the southwest, the river empties into the Saint-Maurice River at 500 meters downstream from the "Rivière-aux-Rats" bridge, built in 1980 to span the Saint-Maurice River. Its mouth is located at the opposite of the hamlet "Rivière-aux-Rats", which is on the east side of Saint-Maurice River, at 29.5 km ( by Route 155) south of Downtown La Tuque. The altitude of the water at the confluence is 121 m. In its watershed, highest mountainous peak reaches up to 381 m.

The mouth of the Wessonneau North River empties into the river Wessonneau about 10.2 km from the mouth of the latter. While the mouth of the "middle Wessonneau River" empties into the Wessonnneau North River about 5.3 km from the mouth of the latter. From the bridge of the "Rivière aux rats", a fork in the road heads west along the route of the river Wessonneau by the north shore. From the bridge, on three kilometers high mountains are bordering the north side of the road.

Forestry was the main economic factor in this sector.

== Toponymy ==
The name "River Wessonneau" was already in use in the nineteenth century. The origin of the name is not yet established. Wesson turns to be a surname of English origin family. This term is found in the names of several American companies, highlighting the surname of one of the founding family ou main owner.

The name "River Wessonneau " was officially registered on December 5, 1968 in the Bank of place names in Commission de toponymie du Québec (Geographical Names Board of Québec).

== See also ==
- Mékinac Regional County Municipality
- La Tuque (urban agglomeration)
- Saint-Maurice River
- Vermillon River (La Tuque)
- Mauricie
