= Zec du Gros-Brochet =

- Location within Quebec
- Location: Canada, Quebec, La Tuque (urban agglomeration) and Mekinac Regional County Municipality
- Nearest city: La Tuque
- Coordinates: 47°20′00″N 73°41′28″W
- Area: 1,439.2 square kilometres (555.7 sq mi)
- Established: 1978
- Governing body: Association Sportive du Gros-Brochet Inc.

The ZEC du Gros-Brochet is a "zone d'exploitation contrôlée" (controlled harvesting area) (ZEC), located in the region of Mauricie, in Quebec, in Canada. This public hunting and fishing area is managed by the "Association Sportive du Gros-Brochet Inc".

== Geography ==
The position of the Entry station of "Zec du Gros-Brochet" is located at the southern end of the territory, just south of the "Red Pine Lake". The Home position is accessible via Quebec Route 131 through Saint-Michel-des-Saints, then following the path of Manouane. Zec is also available on the east side by the bridge of the Rivière-aux-Rats which spans the Saint-Maurice River. Two campsites are equipped for users Zec: Galifet camping and camping St-Arnaud. Visitors of the Zec will drive on forest graveled roads.

Zec is located entirely in forest areas, has a length of 76 km oriented southwest to northeast. While its width is 48 km. Zec is enclosed between Zec Frémont (northwest), Zec du Chapeau-de-Paille (southeast) and Zec Wessonneau (east).

The territory of the Zec Gros Brochet covers cantons: Bisaillon, Dupuis, Laporte and Sincennes.

Lakes Zec subject to fisheries regulations of the Government of Quebec: Lake du Charbon, Chevalier (Knight), Cliff, de la Corneille, Cristal, Diamant, Dupuis, Flapjack, Fretin, Gull, Head, Hemlock, Lingot, Lottinville, "No Outlet" and Salone the most important lakes of the country are: Salone Lake, Crystal, Dupuis, Opocheka, Galefit, Sincennes (straddling two ZECs) and Lake Flamand (Réservoir Blanc). The latter defines the northeast side of the Zec

== Toponymy ==
The name "Gros-Brochet" is directly connected to the intense fishing activity in the territory of the ZEC. Formerly, the first explorers of the territory named places to locate their rudimentary maps. They commonly borrowed names to designate poisons lakes.

The name "Zec Gros Brochet" was officially registered August 5, 1982, at the Bank of place names in Geographical Names Board of Canada the Bank place names includes 190 names using the French word "brochet".

== See also ==
- Saint-Michel-des-Saints
- Zec Frémont
- Zec du Chapeau-de-Paille
- Zec Wessonneau
- Zone d'exploitation contrôlée (Controlled Harvesting Zone) (ZEC)
