= Reservoir Blanc =

- White Reservoir
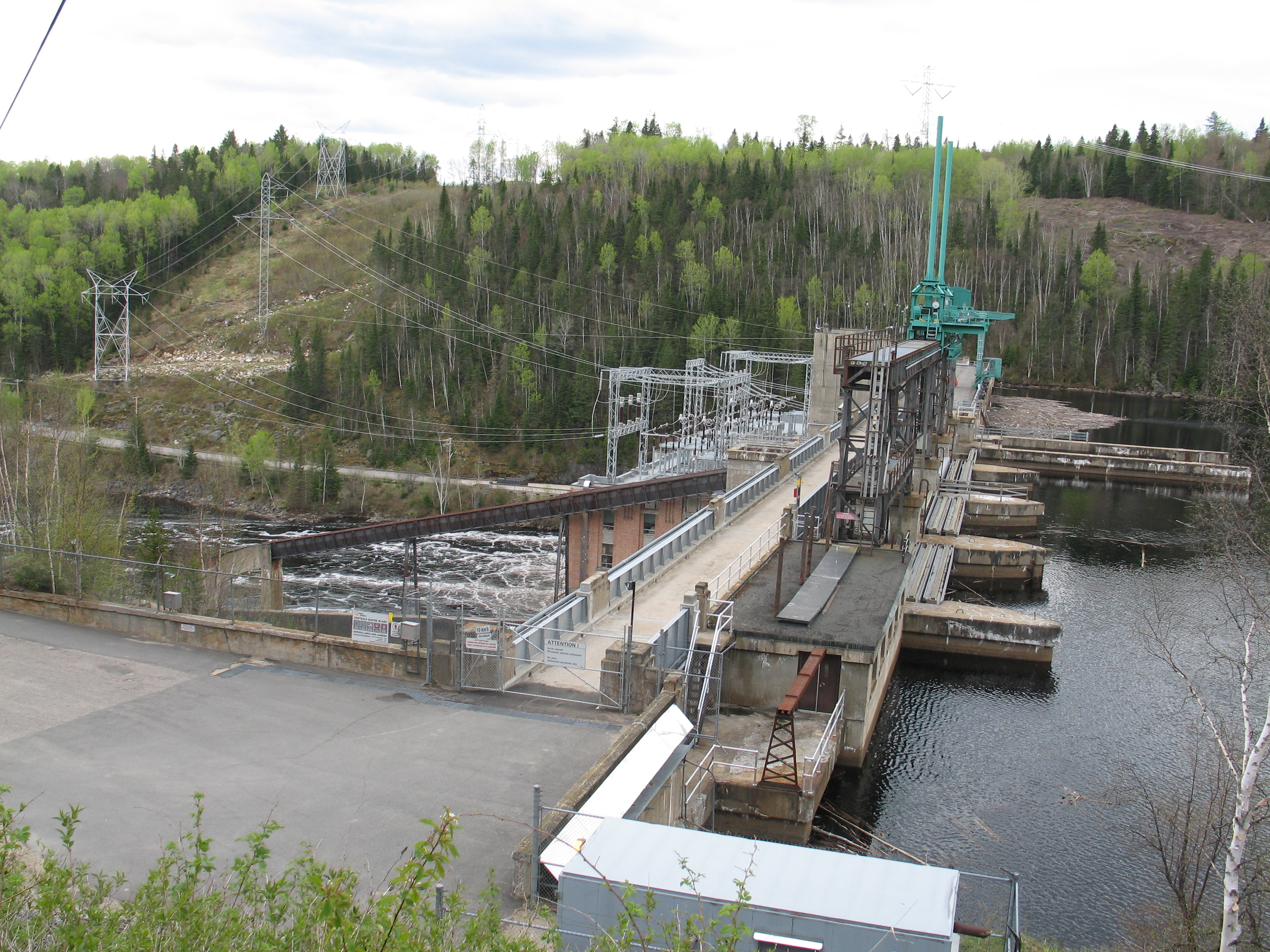
- Rapide-Blanc Generating Station with “Reservoir Blanc” upstream

- Location in Quebec
- Location: Mauricie, Quebec, Canada
- Coordinates: 47.75222°N 73.20639°W
- Lake type: Lake Dam
- Primary inflows: Saint-Maurice River
- Primary outflows: Saint-Maurice River
- Catchment area: 10,079 km^{2} (3,892 sq mi)
- Max. length: 54 km (34 mi)
- Max. width: 2 km (1.2 mi)
- Surface area: 82.6 km^{2} (31.9 sq mi)
- Water volume: 466×10^{6} m^{3} (16.5×10^{9} cu ft)

The Réservoir Blanc (English: White Reservoir) is a reservoir located in the city of La Tuque, in Quebec, Canada. The artificial lake was created in 1930 by the construction of the Rapide-Blanc Generating Station on Saint-Maurice River. The year 1996 marked the end of a period of 150 years of “drave” (transport of wood by flotation on the water) on the Saint-Maurice River; consequently the amateurs of recreation-touristic activities have appropriated the "Réservoir Blanc" mainly for boating and fishing. Around the reservoir and tributaries, a few hundred cottages are there and a few outfitters provide services to visitors.

== Geography ==
Following the erection of the dam Rapide-Blanc Generating Station, the shrug of waters of the Saint-Maurice River in the adjacent territory has created the shape of the reservoir. Upstream, the reservoir begins at the foot of the Rapides-des-Coeurs Generating Station and spans 22.75 km to the Rapide-Blanc Generating Station. From the Rapides-des-Coeurs Generating Station, the river flows south-east: at first, on two km up to the mouth of the Windigo River, then three kilometers before reaching a bend in the river near the hamlet MacTavish. At that point, the river widens two kilometers and forms a "T", receiving waters from the south-west arm of the reservoir. Then the water courant is redirected to the northeast for 13 km. There the river branches south to travel 4.75 km before reaching the Rapide-Blanc Generating Station. Past the Indian Reserve Coucoucache (nord side of the reservoir), the river widens to 3.5 km due to a large bay on the south side.

Between the hamlets of MacTavish and Windigo, the path of the Canadian National Railway crossing over 5.75 km (on a pier in the north-west direction towards the south-east) the “Reservoir Blanc” (near the west bank), where the river forms a "T", linking arms northeast and southeast. From the "T", the southwest branch of the reservoir is six km in length, then branches off to the south for 2.75 km before reaching the White Island, "La pourvoirie du lac Oscar Inc” (Lake Oscar Outfitters Inc) and forest Road 25. The Flamand river flows into the southwest arm of the “Reservoir Blanc”.

"Reservoir Blanc" receives water from the following tributaries:

- on North side: Windigo, Indian Creek, Jolie river, Pierriche and Little Pierriche;
- South side: Cadieux Creek (which flows east at the level of "Rapides de la tête du Rapide-Blanc") (Rapids of the head of Rapide-Blanc) and Mazurette Creek (which flows north in front of the mouth of the river Pierriche).

== Toponymy ==
Formerly designated in French Réservoir du Rapide Blanc, the new name of this water body commemorates the "Rapide-Blanc", rapids on the Saint-Maurice River that were flooded during the construction of the Rapide-Blanc Generating Station and of which only the rapides de la Tête du Rapide-Blanc ("rapids at the head of Rapide-Blanc"), which are located downstream of the dam. The name of the rapids has been known since at least the 19th century.

== See also ==
- La Tuque
- Mauricie
- Rapide-Blanc Generating Station
- Rapides-des-Coeurs Generating Station
- Saint-Maurice River
- Trenche River
