= Saint-Maurice Wildlife Reserve =

Wildlife reserve in Quebec, Canada

- Interactive map of Saint-Maurice Wildlife Reserve
- Location: Mekinac Regional County Municipality, Quebec, Canada
- Nearest city: Shawinigan
- Coordinates: 47°05′00″N 73°15′00″W
- Area: 782 km^{2} (302 sq mi)
- Established: 1963
- Governing body: Sépaq
- Website: www.sepaq.com/rf/stm/index.dot?language_id=1

The Saint-Maurice Wildlife Reserve is a 782-square-kilometre (302 sq mi) wildlife reserve to the north of Shawinigan, Quebec. The reserve is located west of the Saint-Maurice River in the territory of the Mekinac Regional County Municipality. Like all wildlife reserves, this area is dedicated to the conservation, development and use of wildlife as well as the practice of recreational activity. It is not, however, considered a protected area; forest and mining activities are allowed.

== History ==
The reserve was established in 1963 under the name of Saint-Maurice Hunting and Fishing Reserve. Its status was changed in the late 1970s.

== Geography ==
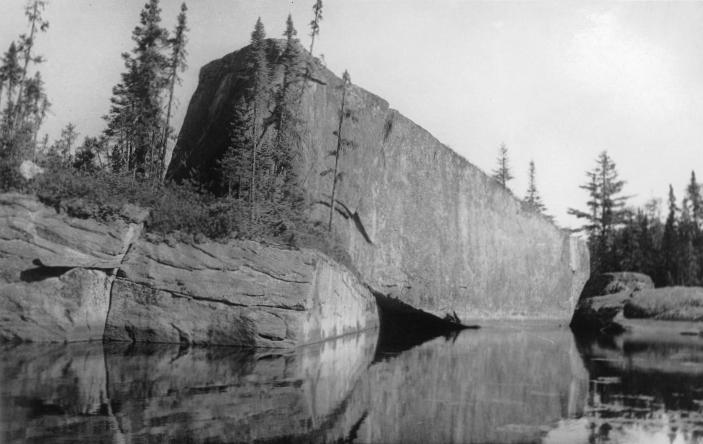
Steamboat Rock, Lac à la Pêche 46°40′53″N 72°51′27″W

The Saint-Maurice Wildlife Reserve is located west of Saint-Maurice River about 90 km (56 mi) north of Trois-Rivières in the Mekinac Regional County Municipality. Although its etymology comes from the eponymous river, it does not touch it.

The reserve houses the proposed Valley-Tousignant Biodiversity Reserve and shares its boundary with the Zec du Chapeau-de-Paille to the southwest and the Zec Wessonneau to the north.

Access to the reserve is via the Mekinac bridge from Route 155 to the north of the Matawin River hamlet. A forest road leading to the reserve is located about ten kilometers to the west. The only docking station, which is located off reserve, is located south of Riviere-Matawin hamlet.

The reserve is located in the Laurentian Mountains. The land is composed of paragneiss of amphibolite and orthogneiss dated 1 billion years. The whole reserve is covered with a basal till 1 m (3.3 ft) thick.

There are over 245 lakes in the reserve, each of which is a part of the Saint-Maurice basin.

== Wildlife ==
The reserve is part of the Laurentian mixed forest. Maple sugar and yellow birch dominate its south hills, while spruce x Birch is abundant in the northern area.

The reserve is frequented by several species of mammals including moose, American black bear, and snowshoe hare.

There are over a hundred species of birds that frequent the reserve, among which are ruffed grouse, Grouse, and loon.

Lake trout and brook trout can be found in the reserve's lakes. Lake Norman, northwest of the reserve, has a small population of kokanee salmon introduced following the Expo 67.

== Proposed Valley-Tousignant Biodiversity Reserve ==
The proposed Valley-Tousignant Biodiversity Reserve is an area that aims to protect a part of the wildlife sanctuary from government desire. It is located entirely within the ecological region of the depression of La Tuque, in the ecological province of the southern Laurentians.
