= Rapides-des-Coeurs generating station =

Hydroelectric power station in Quebec

- Country: Canada
- Location: La Tuque
- Coordinates: 47°47′21″N 73°22′40″W
- Construction began: 2005
- Commission date: 2009
- Owner: Hydro-Quebec
- Operator: Hydro-Quebec

Power generation
- Units operational: 6 x 13.15 MW Kaplan-type (Saxo)
- Nameplate capacity: 76 MW
- Annual net output: 460 GWH

The Rapides-des-Coeurs generating station is a hydroelectric plant and dam erected on the Saint-Maurice River by Hydro-Québec near of Windigo, in the administrative region of Mauricie, in Quebec, in Canada. This plant and the Chute-Allard Generating Station located upstream were put into service in 2008. The construction was completed in 2009.

The hydroelectric plant of Rapides-des-Coeurs generates an output of 76 MW. The main dam is based on rockfill, located on the river. The intake has six sluices and six forced to feed six turbine/generator of SAXO type. The drop height is 22.50 m. The spillway is equipped with valves. Hydro-Québec provides management of ecological river flow.

== Geography ==
The Rapides-des-Coeurs generating station is located 108 km (by road) at northwest of La Tuque, and the Chute-Allard at 120 km. Rapides-des-Coeurs is located at kilometre point 264 and 265 of the Saint-Maurice River, upstream of the Réservoir Blanc. Before watering the basin, rapids extended over a kilometre. A rocky island was at 264.5 kilometre point.

From La Tuque, access is via Route 25, until kilometer 60. From this intersection, an existing forest road due to forestry operations, leads to the right bank of Rapides-des-Coeurs after a journey of just over 27 km.

The hydroelectric plant of Rapides-des-Coeurs is located 3.5 km (2.2 mi) northwest of the town of Windigo, in Upper Mauricie and downstream of the reserve Wemotaci. The area between the Rapides-des-Coeurs and Chute-Allard is part of unorganized territory of Rivière-Windigo. In this sector, the forests are mainly part of public jurisdiction.

The dam of Rapides-des-Coeurs creates a water reservoir stretching 20 km upstream up to the height of the railway station Vandry. The dam submerges an approximate land area of 2.2 km². The maximum flow rate of the water is estimated at 500 m³/second. The average annual energy produced is of the order of 460 GWH.

The electricity produced by the Chute-Allard and Rapides-des-Coeurs is integrated into the network of Hydro-Québec. A line of 230 KV with an approximate length of 60 km connects the positions of these two plants in the central position of Rapide-Blanc Generating Station, located downstream on the Saint-Maurice River.

A temporary bridge crossing the Saint-Maurice River, just upstream of the “Rapides-des-Coeurs” was used during the construction period of the dam.

== History ==
Upstream from the village of Windigo, the Saint-Maurice river had two long rapids: "Les Grands Coeurs" and "les petits Coeurs". They were both very dangerous for the loggers. The harnessing of the river took place in this zone.

In April 2005, the provincial and federal authorities have authorized the completion of the hydro-electric project in the Chute-Allard and central Rapides-des-Coeurs. The construction of facilities began the same year.

For the simultaneous construction of Chute-Allard and Rapides-des-Coeurs, a common camp for the accommodations for workers was built on a site already cleared by forestry activities. This camp was located at 28 km from the site of the Chute-Allard and 47 km from the site of Rapides-des-Coeurs.

The construction of this plant has required the relocation of the Canadian National Railway segment nearly for a mile on the south side of Saint-Maurice River, downstream of the plant. In addition, a segment of more than 400 meters from the railway line was enhanced and in some places the embankment of the railway has been strengthened.

In 2008, the “biefs” (areas submerged by the dam) of the Chute Allard and Rapides-des-Coeurs were watered respectively from 6 to 9 May and August 4 to 22. Commissioning of the latter electric group plans took place on 14 August 2009 for the Chute-Allard Generating Station and October 23, 2009 at the Rapides-des-Coeurs.

Hydro-Québec has made the development of wetlands in the reach of Rapides-des-Coeurs.

== See also ==
- Chute-Allard Generating Station
- Rapide-Blanc Generating Station
- Hydro-Quebec
- Hydropower
- Saint-Maurice River
- La Tuque, Quebec
- List of generating stations in Canada
