= Zec Wessonneau =

Controlled harvesting area

- Location within Quebec
- Location: Canada, Quebec, La Tuque (urban agglomeration)
- Nearest city: La Tuque
- Coordinates: 47°15′00″N 73°17′00″W
- Area: 805.30 square kilometres (310.93 sq mi)
- Established: 1978
- Governing body: Association chasse et pêche Fléchée Inc.

The ZEC Wessonneau is a "zone d'exploitation contrôlée" (controlled harvesting zone) (ZEC), located on the west bank of the Saint-Maurice River, in the La Tuque (urban agglomeration), in the region the Mauricie, in Quebec (Canada). This public hunting and fishing area is managed by the "Association chasse et pêche Fléchée Inc".

== Geography ==
Zec is bordered to the south by Saint-Maurice Wildlife Reserve and on west by the Zec du Chapeau-de-Paille and Gros-Brochet. Zec Wessonneau covers the cantons Baril (created on December 7, 1965), Turcotte (May 7, 1868), Geoffrion (December 7, 1965) and Polette (June 2, 1899).

The southern part of the territory of the Zec Wessonneau has a donut-shaped, comprising a center excluded from the administration of the Zec. The east–west length of the Zec is 62.3 km and a north–south height of 45.5 km. The northeastern boundary of Zec is located only 20.5 km from the Saint-Maurice River (up to the city of La Tuque).

Lakes of the Zec subject to provincial regulations on fishing are: lakes Acarie (Cutaway) Baril, Besijiwan, Combalet, Dempsey, Domaine, Emerald, the Gros Élan (Big Elk), de la Lune (Moon), Maluron, Maria, du Masque (Mask), Mégantic, Misery, Mutis, Mutisk, Oblong, Philimore, Powasson, "aux Pierres" (the Stones), Serpent (Snake), Sourire (Smiling), "de la Tour" (Tower) and "Petit lac de la Truite" (Little Lake of the Trout).

A "poste d'accueil" (entry station) for the Zec Wessonneau is located west of the Saint-Maurice River, near the bridge of the Rivière aux Rats (La Tuque).

== Toponymy ==
The nome of the Zec was borrowed from the Wessonneau River that crosses its territory. The name "Zec Wessonneau" was officially registered on August 5, 1982, at the Bank of place names in Commission de toponymie du Québec (Geographical Names Board of Québec)

== See also ==
=== Related articles ===
- Saint-Maurice River
- La Tuque (urban agglomeration)
- Mauricie
- Zec du Chapeau-de-Paille
- Zec du Gros-Brochet
- Réserve faunique du Saint-Maurice
- Zone d'exploitation contrôlée (Controlled harvesting zone) (ZEC)
