= Vermillon River (La Tuque) =

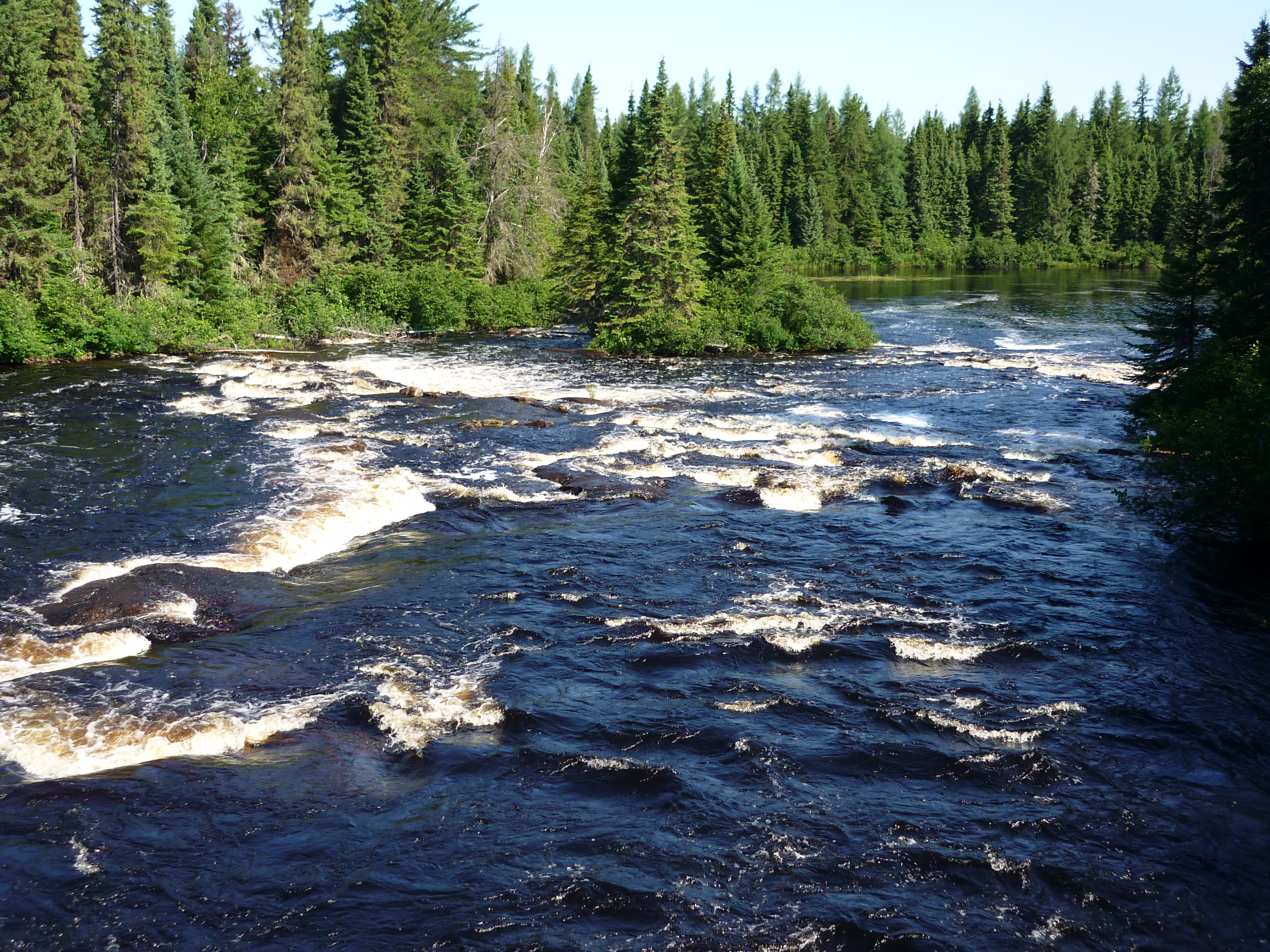

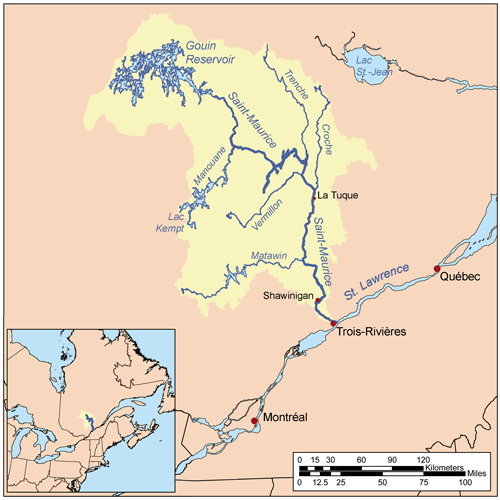

Location
- Country: Canada
- Province: Quebec
- Region: Mauricie

Physical characteristics
- Source: Lake Launay
  - location: MRC Matawinie, Lanaudière
  - coordinates: 48°21′15″N 74°06′00″W
  - elevation: 236 m (774 ft)
- Mouth: Saint-Maurice River
  - location: La Tuque (urban agglomeration)
  - coordinates: 47°38′43″N 72°56′41″W
- Length: 160 km (99 mi)
- Basin size: 2,670 km^{2} (1,030 sq mi)

The Vermillon River (atikamekw : acopekihikan sipi) flows in the territory of La Tuque (urban agglomeration), in Upper-Mauricie, in the administrative region of Mauricie, in Quebec, Canada.

== Geography ==
After a journey of 160 kilometres (99 mi) (east bound), the river flows into the Saint-Maurice River (on the west bank) about 23 kilometres (14 mi) (by water) upstream (north) of Beaumont dam in the City of La Tuque and 20 kilometres (12 mi) downstream (south) of Rapide-Blanc dam. It is one of the largest tributaries of the Saint-Maurice River. Other important rivers are Matawin, Manouane, Trenche and La Croche.

The Launay lake, located north-west of Galifet township, is the head of the Vermillon River. Down, the water flows through several rapids and falls and sometimes fellow a circuitous route in townships of Galifet, The Pottery, Dupuis and Picard. At the level of the dam of "Lac Brûlé" (Burned Lake) (formerly designated Vermilion-A), the Vermillon River turns northeast through the townships of Bisaillon, Olscamps and Payment, heading towards its mouth. in its course the river flows prior to the southeast, then follows a segment 51.3 kilometres (31.9 mi) to the northeast and finally bifurcates at 90 degrees for the last segment of 8.5 kilometres (5.3 mi) flowing eastward to its mouth.

== Toponymy ==
"Vermillon - Two dam" was erected near the railway stop Rapide-Blanc, Quebec, at a place called Vermillon or 5 km upstream of the river mouth.

The name Vermillon also refers to two lakes and a small river, located in the area of "Vermillon - Two". The name refers to the vermilion bright red yellowish. Some authors suggest that as the beginning of the name would be based on a French translation of an amérindianyme. Once in the native manners, often painted their indigenous body with chalk in flamboyant colors.

In 1824, during his testimony to the House of Assembly of Lower Canada, explorer and woodsman Francis Verreault emphasizes the Raman (Vermilion) River. In addition, Romaine River, in Côte-Nord (North Shore) region was originally designated Ouramane (Olomane) meaning "vermilion".

In his handwritten notes of his travels, written no later than 1830, merchant Jean-Baptiste Perrault wrote: "From there to the Vermillon River and the second port of Vermillon". The Abenaki, in turn, means that river under the name Azobakhigan, which means "Where we paddle quickly". For Atikamekws, this river is named Kanimepirikaci Matawa, a tributary of Lake carp.

The name "Vermillon River" was officially registered on December 5, 1968, the Bank of place names in Commission de toponymie du Québec (Geographical Names Board of Québec).

== History ==
1651: arrival of the first white to Indian territory in Atikamekw evangelisation goal of the Catholic religion. About 550 Indians occupy the shores of Saint-Maurice River. Father Jacques Buteux (first Jesuit missionary in the region) was one of the first European victims of Iroquois raids.

Late 18th century: The Atikamekws' war against the Iroquois and victims of epidemics of smallpox, are almost completely destroyed. These nomadic assiduously frequented the trading posts installed by the Hudson's Bay Company.

1680: the fur grows. Thirty whites roamed the land. The North West Company and Hudson's Bay Company intensify often treated at the expense of the natives. The posts were installed to control the Rivière aux Rats (Mauricie) in La Tuque (1700), the Vermillion River, Parent and Weymontachie.

Mid-19th century: With forestry, colonization of the Upper-Mauricie by non-indigenous begins.

== See also ==
- La Tuque
- La Tuque (urban agglomeration)
- Saint-Maurice River
- Rapide-Blanc Dam
