= Baie du Canot Rouge =

- Location within Quebec
- Location: Baie-de-la-Bouteille (Unorganized territory), MRC Matawinie Regional County Municipality, Lanaudière.
- Coordinates: 46.82278°N 73.77333°W
- Basin countries: Canada
- Max. length: 6.0 kilometres (3.7 mi)
- Max. width: 2.2 kilometres (1.4 mi)

The Baie du Canot Rouge (English: Red Canoe Bay) is a bay of the Taureau Reservoir, in the unorganized territory of Baie-de-la-Bouteille, in the Matawinie Regional County Municipality (MRC), in the administrative region of Lanaudière, in Quebec, in Canada.

From the middle of 19th century, forestry was the predominant economic activity in the sector. From 20th century, recreational tourism activities were highlighted. This body of water is very famous for pleasure boating.

The lake's surface is generally frozen from November to April; however, safe circulation on the ice is usually from mid-December to the end of March.

== Geography ==
The {Baie du Canot Rouge "is 6.0 kilometres (3.7 mi) long (oriented to the southwest) and is located northeast of the Taureau Reservoir. This bay is located at the western limit of the Mastigouche Wildlife Reserve.

The bay receives on its west shore the waters of René stream and from the east, the outlet of Lac de la Pomme.

== Toponymy ==
The toponym "Baie du Canot Rouge" was formalized on December 5, 1968 at the Place Names Bank of the Commission de toponymie du Québec.

== See also ==
- Taurus Reservoir
- Lac Taureau Regional Park
- Matawinie Regional County Municipality
- Baie-de-la-Bouteille, unorganized territory
- Mastigouche Wildlife Reserve
- Ruisseau du Canot Rouge (Matawinie), a tributary of Taurus Reservoir
- Matawin River
