= Rivière des Aulnaies (rivière du Milieu) =

River in Canada

Location
- Country: Canada
- Province: Quebec
- Region: Lanaudière
- MRC: Matawinie Regional County Municipality

Physical characteristics
- Source: Lake Carufel
  - location: Saint-Michel-des-Saints
  - coordinates: 46°43′25″N 74°02′08″W
  - elevation: 438 m (1,437 ft)
- Mouth: Rivière du Milieu (Lanaudière)
  - location: Baie-de-la-Bouteille
  - coordinates: 46°47′56″N 73°58′09″W
  - elevation: 353 m (1,158 ft)
- Length: 17.6 km (10.9 mi)

Basin features
- Tributaries
  - left: (upstream) Discharge of lac du Trèfle, discharge du lac Conscrit.
  - right: (upstream) Discharge of lac Creux, discharge of lac Saint-Alexis, discharge of lac Kataway, discharge of lac Saint-Paul.

The rivière des Aulnaies (English: alders river) is a tributary of the rivière du Milieu, flowing on the west side of the Saint-Maurice River, in the Matawinie Regional County Municipality, in the administrative region of Lanaudière, in the province of Quebec, in Canada. The course of the river crosses the territories of:

- Saint-Michel-des-Saints (municipality): canton of Brassard;
- Baie-de-la-Bouteille (unorganised territory): canton of Laviolette.

The Rivière des Aulnaies is part of the watershed of the Rivière du Milieu, the Taureau Reservoir and the Matawin River; the latter generally flows east to spill onto the east bank of the Saint-Maurice River, which in turn spills to Trois-Rivières on the north bank of the Saint Lawrence River.

The economic activity of the Aulnaies river watershed turns out to be forestry and recreational tourism activities. The course of the river flows entirely in forest areas. The river surface is generally frozen from mid-December until the end of March.

== Geography ==
The Aulnaies River rises at the mouth of Carufel Lake (length: 0.8 km (0.50 mi); altitude: 438 m (1,437 ft)) in the township of Brassard, in the municipality of Saint -Michel-des-Saints. This lake is located on the southwest side of a mountain whose summit reaches 573 m (1,880 ft). The mouth of this Carufel lake is located 9.5 km (5.9 mi) southeast of the confluence of the Aulnaies river, 10.0 km (6.2 mi) northwest of the village center from Saint-Michel-des-Saints and 30.1 km (18.7 mi) south-east of the mouth of the Taureau reservoir. From the mouth of Carufel Lake, the Aulnaies river flows over 17.6 km (10.9 mi), according to the following segments:

- 2.7 km (1.7 mi) south-east, in the township of Brassard, crossing Lac Brod (length: 0.6 km (0.37 mi); altitude: 425 m (1,394 ft)) over its full length and Lake Saint-Martin (length: 0.9 km (0.56 mi); altitude: 421 m (1,381 ft)), to the mouth;
- 3.5 km (2.2 mi) north-east, to the outlet of Lac du Trèfle (coming from the north-west);
- 2.4 km (1.5 mi) towards the northeast, crossing Lac Beaulieu (length: 0.3 km (0.19 mi); altitude: 366 m (1,201 ft)) at the end of the segment, to the mouth;
- 8.5 km (5.3 mi) northwards, to the limit of the township of Laviolette;
- 0.2 km (0.12 mi) north-east in the Laviolette canton by cutting a forest road, until the confluence of the river.

The Aulnaies river flows into the canton of Laviolette, on the southwest bank of the Middle river. The confluence of the Aulnaies river is located at:

- 1.2 km (0.75 mi) downstream of the confluence of the Laviolette River;
- 13.5 km (8.4 mi) north-west of the center of Saint-Michel-des-Saints;
- 22.9 km (14.2 mi) west of the mouth of the Taureau Reservoir;
- 81 km (50 mi) west of the confluence of the Matawin river.

== Toponymy ==
The toponym Rivière des Aulnaies was formalized on December 5, 1968, at the Commission de toponymie du Québec.
