= Lac Taureau Regional Park =

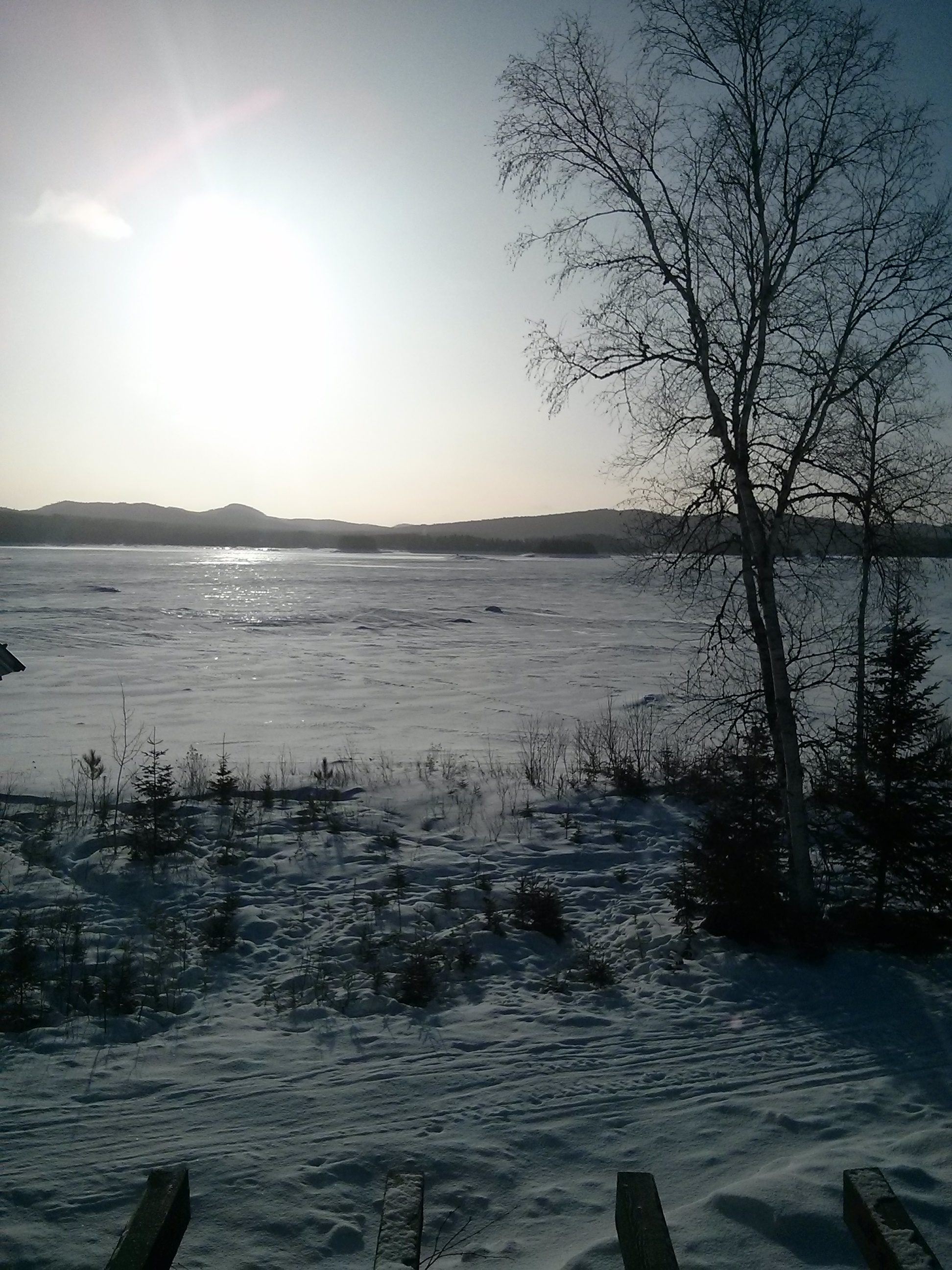
- Taureau reservoir in winter

- Location within Quebec
- Location: Matawinie Regional County Municipality, Quebec, Canada
- Nearest city: Saint-Michel-des-Saints, Quebec
- Coordinates: 46.78°N 73.81°W
- Area: 228 km^{2} (88 sq mi)
- Established: 2005
- Governing body: Matawinie RCM

The Lac Taureau Regional Park is a regional park set around Taureau Reservoir (sometimes identified as Toro or Matawin reservoir, and colloquially dubbed as Taureau lake), located in part (south half) in the municipality of Saint-Michel-des-Saints and unorganized territories of Baie-de-la-Bouteille and Lac-Matawin, in the Matawinie regional county municipality, in the administrative region of Lanaudière, in Quebec in Canada.

== History ==
By the mid-19th Century, this sector has grown mainly through agriculture and forestry. Intensive logging generated logs which were deposited on the ice during winter. Driftwood down the Matawin River to the Saint-Maurice River, to feed the pulp and paper mills downstream, such as those of Grand-Mère Shawinigan and Trois-Rivières. From the 20th century, recreation and tourism are major activities in the region.

Initiatives for the creation of a recreation area date back to 1992, but the park itself was officially founded in 2005.

== Geography ==
The park is located 155 kilometres (96 mi) north of Montreal. Lac Taureau park shares its eastern limits with Mastigouche Wildlife Reserve. The large reservoir of Lake Taureau covers 95 square kilometres (37 sq mi). This large lake has 31.7 kilometres (19.7 mi) of banks including many sandy beaches, including the beach of Pointe-Fine located at the end of a peninsula jutting off the center of the lake. This lake has 45 islands. The sandy shores of "Baie du Milieu" (bays of the Middle), and "Baie des embranchements" (baie of Splitter) and "Baie du Poste" attract fans of camping and swimming in a wildness.

The Matawin River flows into the reservoir by the west side, and jump back to the lake outlet (the East side), controlled by the Matawin dam erected at the bottom of the Barrage bay at an altitude of 356.58 metres (1,169.9 ft).

The reservoir is divided into three parts, each adopting the north-south axis and connected by narrow passages. Each part has several large bays:

- Western part of the Lake : Poste, Milieu and Village bays;
- Central part : Canot Rouge, Roe bay and Ignace bays;
- Eastern part : Barrage and Bouteille bays.

The park protects 45 islands sat on Taureau reservoir. The most important are:

- Jaune, Grands Vents, Sables Chauche and Barineau in the western part;
- France, Flottante, Jumelles, Village and Ouest islands in the central part,
- Lacroix (the largest in the area) and Pin Gris islands in the eastern parts.

== Recreation and tourism activities ==
The regional park offers opportunity for resorting, water sports (including swimming and boating), camping and hiking in the forest. The park has several rustic campsites, including the Milieu and Poste bays sites.

The parks also counts some trails, some maintained by private landlords:

- Dominique Bay trail (4.6 kilometres (2.9 mi));
- Dominique Bay loop (3.1 kilometres (1.9 mi));
- Pedestrian network of the Lac Taureau inn, located on the western shore of the lake at the end of the peninsula separating Milieu and Village bay.

Several outfitters offer kayak tours or other types of boats to visit unsettled bays.
