= Rivière du Milieu (Lanaudière) =

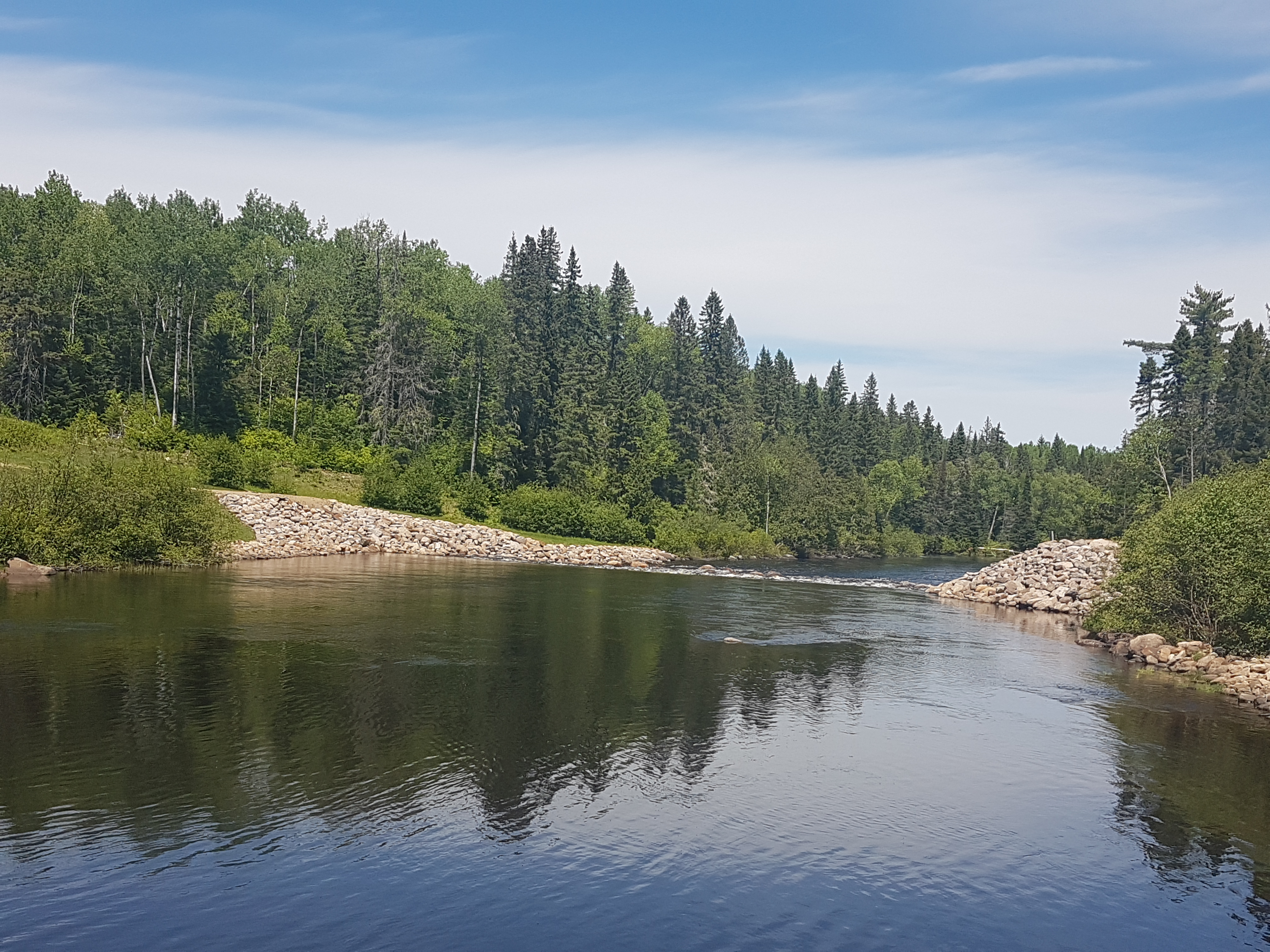

- Location within Quebec

Location
- Country: Canada
- Province: Quebec
- Region: Lanaudière
- Regional County Municipality: Matawinie Regional County Municipality

Physical characteristics
- Source: Lake Hastel
  - location: Baie-de-la-Bouteille
  - coordinates: 47°05′15″N 74°16′13″W
  - elevation: 473 m (1,552 ft)
- Mouth: Taureau Reservoir
  - location: Baie-de-la-Bouteille
  - coordinates: 46°46′47″N 73°55′42″W
  - elevation: 351 m (1,152 ft)
- Length: 62.5 km (38.8 mi)

Basin features
- Progression: Taureau Reservoir, Matawin River, Saint-Maurice River, Saint Lawrence River
- Tributaries
  - left: (upstream) discharge of Lake Dominica; discharge of an unnamed lake; discharge of the lakes of Potasse, Marcil and André; discharge of two unnamed lakes; Laviolette River (draining Laviolette lake); small Perreault stream, Perrault stream, outlet of Lake Arsène; 3 unnamed streams; discharge of Lake Liby; discharge from Copping lake, Guide brook, discharge from an unnamed lake; Boullé River; Spring Creek; Saint-Cyr stream; Bug Lake discharge; 2 unnamed lake dumps; 7 unnamed lake dumps.
  - right: (upstream) discharge of Lac Saint-Jean; Aulnaies River; discharge of Lake Saint-Conrad; discharge of unnamed lakes; Coteaux stream; discharge from the Lac de la Sangsue; McDougal Creek; Pierron stream; Algonquin Creek; discharge from Lac Misère; Boiret stream; 4 discharges from a series of unnamed lakes.

The rivière du Milieu ('River of the Middle') flows in the unorganized territory Baie-de-la-Bouteille, in the Matawinie Regional County Municipality, in the administrative region of Lanaudière, in the province of Quebec, in Canada.

The course of the river is entirely in a forest environment. From the end of the XIXth, the economy of the sector was centered on forestry. At XXth, recreational and tourist activities have been highlighted.

== Geography ==
The Milieu River (Lanaudière) has its source at Lake Hastel (1.9 km (1.2 mi) long, facing south), in the unorganized territory Baie-de-la-Bouteille at 474 m (1,555 ft) of altitude. This lake is surrounded to the west by a mountain with a summit reached 600 m (2,000 ft), that of the northeast reached 540 m (1,770 ft) and that of the west 523 m (1,716 ft). The watershed on the northeast side of this lake is the Alexandrine River. Lake Hastel drains mountain lakes all around, including lakes: "de la Pipe", "au Sable" and Laroche.

Course downstream from Lake Hastel

From the mouth of Lake Hastel (south-eastern point), the Milieu river descends on:

- 200 m (660 ft) southward to empty into the northeastern part of Corner Lake;
- 2.2 km (1.4 mi) west, then southwest, crossing Lake Corner (altitude: 474 m (1,555 ft)). This lake receives on the east side the discharge of the lakes (altitude): du Camp (479 m (1,572 ft)), Garceau (478 m (1,568 ft)) and Azellus (480 m (1,570 ft)); and on the west side the discharge of the lakes (altitudes): des Faucons (543 m (1,781 ft)), Pies (510 m (1,670 ft)) and Coucoune (499 m (1,637 ft));
- 0.5 km (0.31 mi) towards the south, crossing 4 small lakes including Lac de la Forêt (altitude: 463 m (1,519 ft)) which is a marshy lake;
- 650 m (2,130 ft) to the southwest, crossing Lac du Bocage, which receives a stream from the north draining lakes Rovolver (535 m (1,755 ft)), du Père (544 m (1,785 ft)) and Swallows (527 m (1,729 ft));
- 1.6 km (0.99 mi) towards the south-west, forming several coils, until the discharge coming from the south, which drains the lakes of Piment and of Buisson;
- 1.6 km (0.99 mi) towards the southwest, forming several coils, until the discharge coming from the north of the horseshoe lake (altitude: 454 m (1,490 ft)) and the lake of the Pitoune (altitude: 461 m (1,512 ft));
- 210 m (690 ft) southwesterly to the outlet coming from the south of Lac du Button (altitude: 457 m (1,499 ft)) coming from the east;
- 1.5 km (0.93 mi) towards the south, up to the outlet of lac de la Hutte (altitude: 454 m (1,490 ft)) coming from the east;
- 1.3 km (0.81 mi) towards the south, in several serpentines to Lac Chantier;
- 2.6 km (1.6 mi) southward crossing Chantier lake (altitude: 450 m (1,480 ft)) over its full length.

Course downstream from Lac Chantier

From the mouth of Chantier Lake, the river descends:

- 200 m (660 ft) to the south-east;
- 1.4 km (0.87 mi) crossing Lake des Fourches from north to south (altitude: 454 m (1,490 ft));
- 1.3 km (0.81 mi) towards the south-east to a small lake of Merle (altitude: 449 m (1,473 ft)) that the river crosses;
- 1.3 km (0.81 mi) southeasterly to the outlet of Bug Lake (altitude 476 m (1,562 ft)), coming from the northeast;
- 2.7 km (1.7 mi) towards the south-east up to the Saint-Cyr stream (altitude: 426 m (1,398 ft)), coming from the north-east;
- 4.1 km (2.5 mi) southeasterly, to Spring Creek (elevation: 409 m (1,342 ft)), coming from the north;
- 1.9 km (1.2 mi) towards the south-east, up to the Boullé stream (altitude: 400 m (1,300 ft)), coming from the east;
- 3.5 km (2.2 mi) towards the south, up to the Guide brook (altitude: 392 m (1,286 ft)), coming from the east;
- 0.9 km (0.56 mi) south-east, to Charland lake;
- 8.3 km (5.2 mi) towards the south-east, crossing Lake Charland (altitude: 391 m (1,283 ft)), which has many peninsulas on each shore.

Course downstream from Lake Charland

From the mouth of Charland Lake, the river flows down to:

- 2.4 km (1.5 mi) south-east to a bridge (altitude: 385 m (1,263 ft)) of the forest road spanning the river;
- 2.9 km (1.8 mi) towards the southeast to the mouth of the outlet (altitude: 381 m (1,250 ft)) of Lake Arsène (altitude: 388 m (1,273 ft)), coming from the east;
- 3.0 km (1.9 mi) eastward, crossing the "Rapides Perrault", to the stream (altitude: 379 m (1,243 ft)) coming from the north and draining a series of lakes;
- 0.9 km (0.56 mi) towards the southeast, up to the Perrault brook (altitude: 378 m (1,240 ft));
- 1.8 km (1.1 mi) south-east, then north-east, to the Coteaux stream, coming from the south;
- 4.7 km (2.9 mi) towards the south-east, crossing the "Rapides du Brochet", to the Laviolette river (altitude: 366 m (1,201 ft)), coming from the north and draining Laviolette lake (altitude: 383 m (1,257 ft)). The Laviolette river is the main tributary of the Milieu river;
- 3.1 km (1.9 mi) to the south-east, then to the north, to the outlet (altitude: 352 m (1,155 ft)) of Lac de la Potasse, coming from the north;
- 2.8 km (1.7 mi) towards the south-east, up to the outlet (altitude: 351 m (1,152 ft)) of Lake Dominica, coming from the north;
- 3.9 km (2.4 mi) south-east, to the Middle Bay of Taureau Reservoir.

The Rivière du Milieu descends southward entirely into the unorganized territory of Baie-de-la-Bouteille, crossing the Blueberry, Perrault and Brochet rapids. From the mouth by going up the river, the Manouane road runs along the river on the west side; then north of lac des fourches, this path continues on the east side of the river.

== Toponymy ==
The toponym Rivière du Milieu is likened to the Baie du Milieu where the river flows. The toponym Rivière du Milieu was registered on December 5, 1968, in the Place Names Bank of the Commission de toponymie du Québec.

== See also ==
- List of rivers of Quebec
