= Rivière des Aulnaies =

Rivière des Aulnaies may refer to:

- Rivière des Aulnaies (rivière du Milieu), a river in Saint-Michel-des-Saints, Quebec, Canada
- Rivière des Aulnaies (la Belle Rivière), a river in Hébertville, Quebec, Canada
- Rivière des Aulnaies (Saguenay River), a river in Saint-Ambroise, Quebec, Canada
