= Mandeville, Quebec =

Mandeville
- Municipality
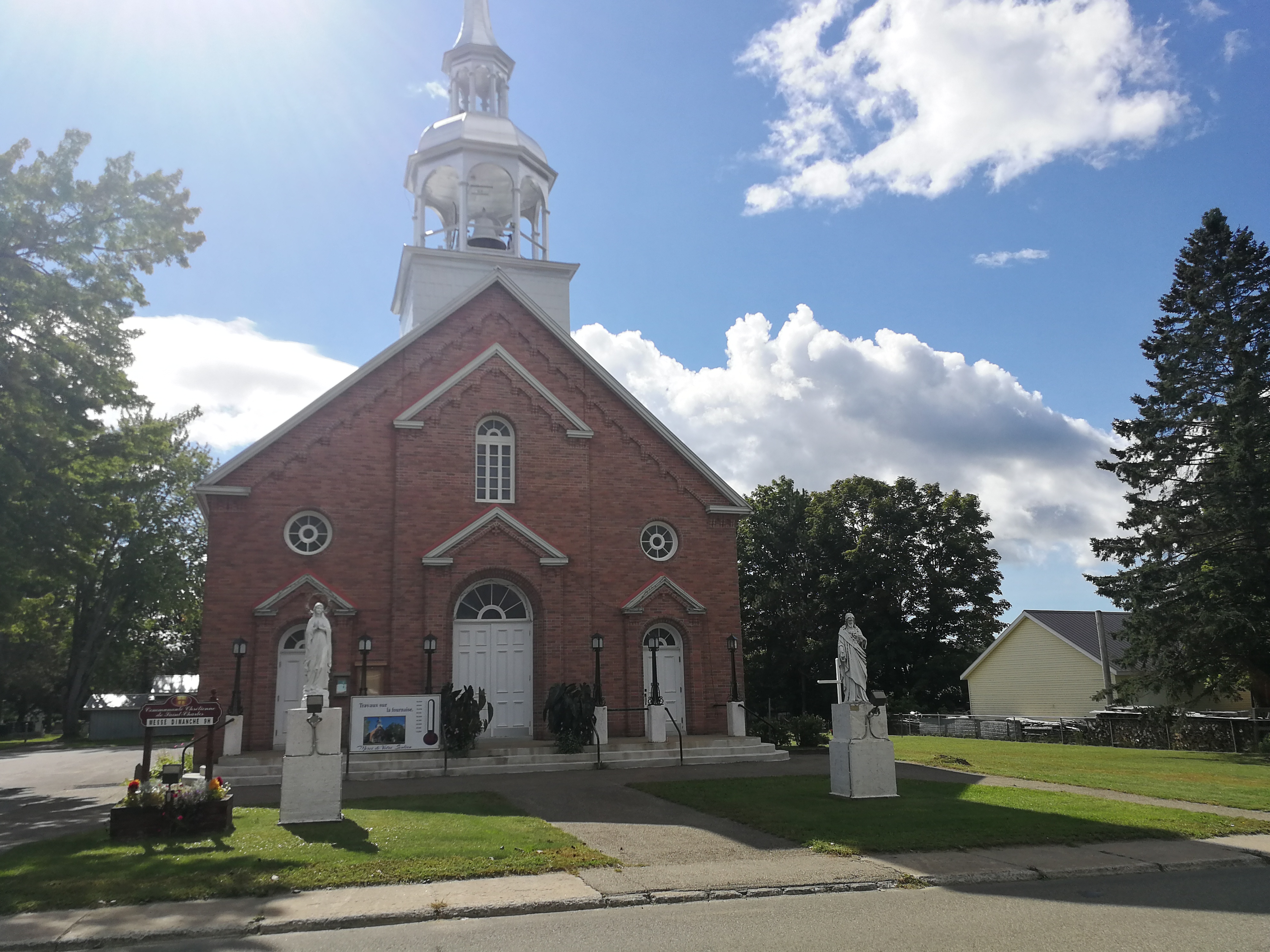
- Saint-Charles-de-Mandeville Church
- Motto: Tous ensemble en avant
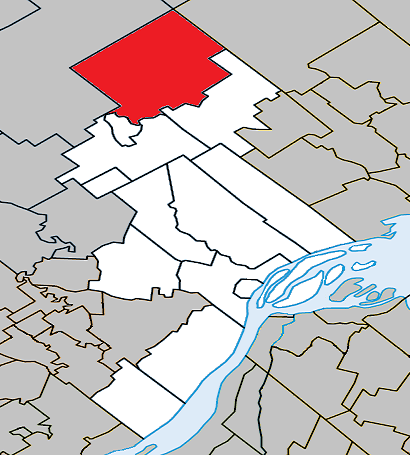
- Location within D'Autray RCM

- Location in central Quebec
- Coordinates: 46°22′N 73°21′W
- Country: Canada
- Province: Quebec
- Region: Lanaudière
- RCM: D'Autray
- Settled: 1824
- Constituted: April 20, 1904

Government
  - Mayor: Marc Desrochers
  - Fed. riding: Berthier—Maskinongé
  - Prov. riding: Berthier

Area
  - Total: 339.63 km^{2} (131.13 sq mi)
  - Land: 318.21 km^{2} (122.86 sq mi)

Population (2021)
  - Total: 2,363
  - Density: 7.4/km^{2} (19/sq mi)
  - Change 2016-21: ▲7.9%
  - Dwellings: 1,860
- Time zone: UTC−5 (EST)
  - Summer (DST): UTC−4 (EDT)
- Postal code(s): J0K 1L0
- Area codes: 450, 579
- Highways: No major routes
- Website: www.mandeville.ca

Mandeville (French pronunciation: [mɑ̃dvil]) is a municipality in the D'Autray Regional County Municipality in the Lanaudière region of Quebec, Canada.

Prior to June 2, 2001, it was officially known as Saint-Charles-de-Mandeville.

Mandeville is home to the Pléïades Observatory, managed by Centre d'Observation et de Recherche Astronomique Mandeville (C.O.R.A.M. Inc.).

== History ==
In the early 19th century, the territory was part of the Hope Fief. This fief, with an area of 20,000 arpents (68.4 km^{2}) was granted to Angélique Blondeau by Seignoral Lord Charles-Louis Tarieu de Lanaudière, but was mostly neglected by the seignoral lords. In 1824, one of the first settlers, Maximillien or Maxime Mandeville, arrived at the shores of the lake that today bears his name. And in 1837, further colonization occurred when a large group of settlers came from Maskinongé, Berthierville, and Sorel.

In 1894, the Mission of Saint-Charles-de-Mandeville was formed and became a parish in 1903. The name is most likely a reference to Charles Turgeon, pastor of the nearby parish of Saint-Didace, who worked extensively in Mandeville. In 1904, the Municipality of Saint-Charles-de-Mandeville was established and in 1905, its post office opened.

Since the toponym "Saint-Charles" had not been in common use for a long time, the municipality officially abbreviated its name to Mandeville in 2001. Soon after, the municipal boundary between Mandeville and Saint-Damien was reorganized, and Mandeville gained about 146 square kilometres (56 sq mi).

== Geography ==
The town itself is located along the Mastigouche River, just north of Lake Maskinongé. The municipal territory is dotted with lakes, many of which are lined with cottages. The northern portion is undeveloped and part of the Mastigouche Wildlife Reserve. Mandeville is popular for hunting and trapping (bear, moose, wolf, lynx) and fishing (musky, trout, bass).

== Demographics ==
In the 2021 Census of Population conducted by Statistics Canada, Mandeville had a population of 2,363 living in 1,242 of its 1,860 total private dwellings, a change of 7.9% from its 2016 population of 2,189. With a land area of 318.21 km^{2} (122.86 sq mi), it had a population density of 7.4/km^{2} (19.2/sq mi) in 2021.

Historical census populations – Mandeville, Quebec

Year	Pop.	±%
1911	734	—
1921	1,172	+59.7%
1931	1,026	−12.5%
1941	1,256	+22.4%
1951	1,335	+6.3%
1956	1,266	−5.2%
1961	1,236	−2.4%

Year	Pop.	±%
1966	1,228	−0.6%
1971	1,252	+2.0%
1976	1,243	−0.7%
1981	1,458	+17.3%
1986	1,541	+5.7%
1991	1,725	+11.9%
1996	1,824	+5.7%

Year	Pop.	±%
2001	1,878	+3.0%
2006	2,221	+18.3%
2011	2,043	−8.0%
2016	2,189	+7.1%
2021	2,363	+7.9%

Source: Statistics Canada

Mother tongue (2021):

- English as first language: 1.9%
- French as first language: 96.2%
- English and French as first languages: 0.8%
- Other as first language: 1.1%

== Government ==
The mayors of Mandeville were:

- Séraphin Baril 1905-1906
- Joseph Dulac 1907-1908
- Joseph Prescott 1908-1913, 1916-1924, 1926-1932
- Amédée Sylvestre 1914-1915
- Joseph Charpentier 1925-1926
- Henri Pontbriand 1933-1934
- Albert Charbonneau 1935-1947
- Alcide Desjardins 1948-1960, 1963-1970
- Alfred Prescott 1961-1962
- Roger Dupuis 1971
- Donat Savoie 1972-1978, 1981-1983
- Réal Bilodeau 1979-1980
- Jacques Prescott 1983-1995
- Roland Rocheleau 1995-1999
- François Benjamin 1999-2007
- Francine Bergeron 2007-2021
- Michael C. Turcot 2021-2025
- Marc Desrochers 2025–present

== Education ==
Commission scolaire des Samares operates francophone public schools, including:

- École Youville

The Sir Wilfrid Laurier School Board operates anglophone public schools, including:

- Joliette Elementary School in Saint-Charles-Borromée
- Joliette High School in Joliette

== See also ==
- List of municipalities in Quebec
