= Matawin River (Quebec) =

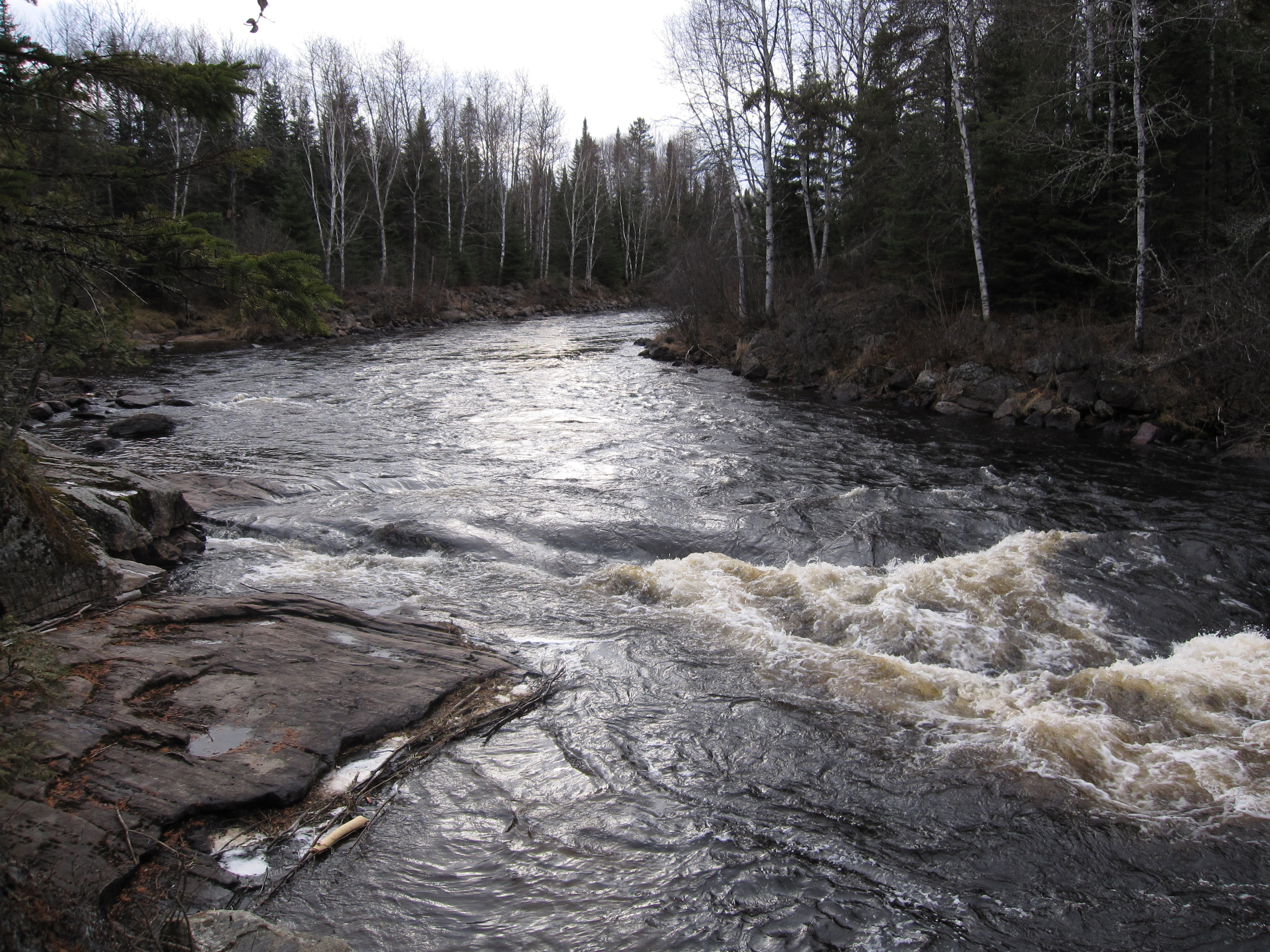
- Autumn flow

Location
- Country: Canada
- Province: Quebec
- Region: Saint-Michel-des-Saints

Physical characteristics
- Source
  - location: Matawin Lake, Lac-Matawin, Quebec; Elevation 491 m (1,611 ft); 46°49′00″N 74°18′00″W
- Mouth
  - location: Saint-Maurice River at Shawinigan / Lake Norman, Quebec, 1 km South of Matawin-River hamlet Elevation: 101 metres (331 ft); 46°54′11″N 72°56′00″W
- Length: 161 km (100 mi)
- Basin size: 5,560 km^{2} (2,150 sq mi)

Basin features
- River system: St. Lawrence River

The Matawin River is a 161-kilometre (100 mi) river, flowing from west to east through the administrative regions of Lanaudière and Mauricie, in Quebec, Canada.

Matawin River is the main tributary of the Saint-Maurice River. Other major tributaries are the rivers Vermillion and Manouane, for which their respective mouth is located North of La Tuque.

On its way, the Matawin River feeds mainly the Taureau Reservoir which is surrounded by the Regional Park of Taureau Lake.

Since the mid-19th century, forestry has been the dominant economic activity of the Matawin River watershed, with tourism taking place as a secondary role.

== Geography ==
Matawin river's main source is lake Matawin in Rouge-Matawin Wildlife Reserve, in Charland Township, about 8 miles southwest of Lake Charland, which is created by an expansion of "Rivière-du-milieu. Matawin ouest river flows prior to the South and cross many lakes up to the boundary of Mont-Tremblant National Park. Then the river goes toward East up to the village of Saint-Michel-des-Saints). The river empties into a large bay, in the village, at the south of the western part of réservoir Taureau (Taureau Reservoir). Lac-Taureau is an unorganized part of the Matawinie Regional County Municipality, which is part of the administrative region of Lanaudière territory.

From the discharge of the latter lake, Matawin river continues its course by flowing Eastward. Finally, the river flows into the Saint-Maurice River approximately midway between La Tuque and Grand-Mère. The mouth of Matawin River is located one kilometer south of Matawin Island located in the middle of Saint-Maurice River.

Between Taureau Reservoir and Saint-Maurice River, Matawin River forms the northern boundary of the La Mauricie National Park.

== Toponymy ==
The name Matawin (sometimes referred as Mantawa or Mattawin ) is originally in Algonquin derived from the word "Matawane" which means "river falling fast". The Abenaki called the river Madôwaizibo which also means water meeting or confluence. This noun appears as "Mataouan" or "Mattaouan" in the Journal of the Chevalier de Troyes in 1686 designating a fork of river. This word has a very general sense, because it can be used to describe many river situations.

The name "Matawin River" appears in various cartographic representations or otherwise, since the early nineteenth century. The name "Matawin River" is in the book "A topographical dictionary of the Province of Lower Canada", designed by surveyor Joseph Bouchette, published in 1832. In 1854, H. Legendre stands Plan of part of the Matawin River in the Lordship of Cap-de-la-Madeleine. Theophile Stanislas Provost, pastor of Saint-Alphonse-Rodriguez, cites "Mantawa River" in a letter to the journalist André Montpetit Napoleon in 1862. Some reference books indicate, in 1914 and 1925 "Mattawin river".

The name of the "Réserve faunique Rouge-Matawin" (Rouge-Matawin Wildlife Reserve) was taken from the name "Matawin River" in concert with the "Rivière Rouge" (Red River), through which it flows.

== History ==
The forest industry caused the early wealth of Matawinie (Matawin River Valley). In 1839, a project was established north of the river. In 1860, the Government of United Canada invested in the development of the river to allow entrepreneurs to exploit pine forests in the region that was already being called Matawinie. At the same time, colonization of this part of the country began where the parish of Saint-Michel-des-Saints was founded in 1863.

At the beginning of the 20th century, the forestry industry used the Matawin river to transport timber from the waterline cuts in the region, floating logs down the stream to reach the Saint-Maurice River and downstream pulp mills Grand-Mère, Shawinigan and Trois-Rivières.

== Sporting and tourist activities ==
Matawin river offers the longest segment of continuous rapids of class 3 and 4 in Quebec. Ideal for practicing water sports, this river is famous for rafting, river kayaking and hydrospeed. This river is suitable for multi-day expeditions, since several sites camping can be found on its shores and offer various services for various water activities.

== See also ==
- Rivière Matawin (Hamlet)
- Unorganized territory of Taureau Lake
- Regional Park of Taureau Lake
- Mauricie
- Saint-Maurice River
- Municipality of Trois-Rives
- Municipality of Saint-Michel-des-Saints
- Vermilion River
- Manouane River
