= Saint-Michel-des-Saints =

- Municipality
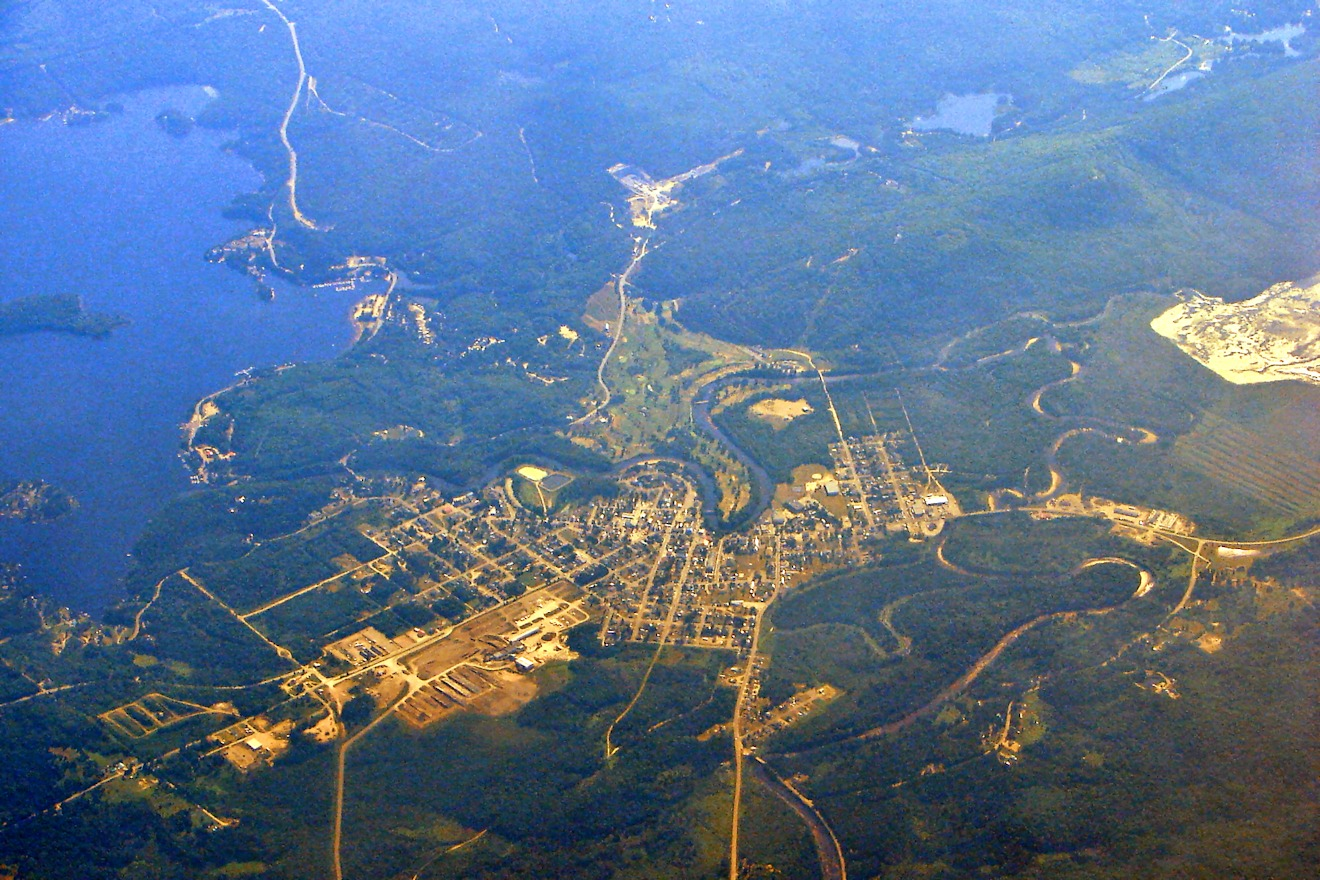

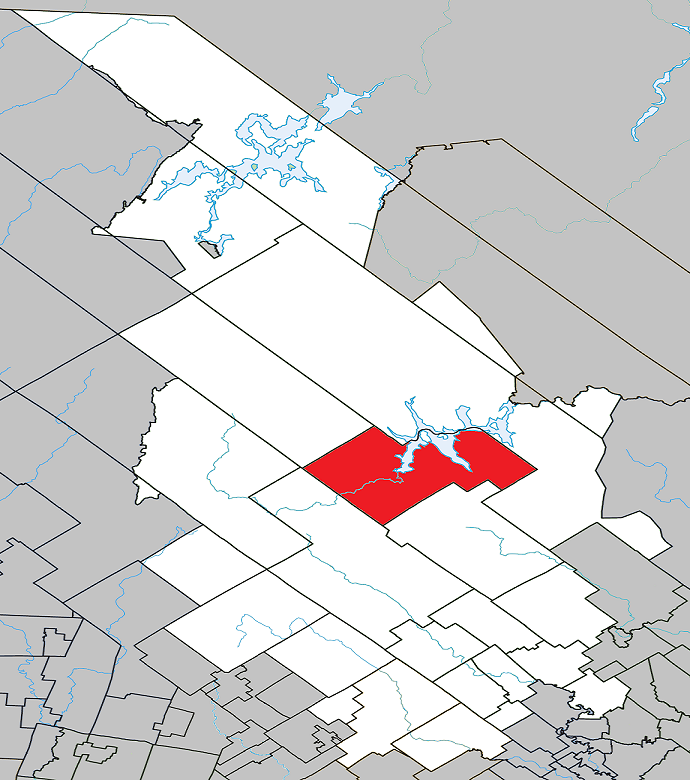
- Location within Matawinie RCM.

- Location in central Quebec
- Coordinates: 46°41′N 73°55′W
- Country: Canada
- Province: Quebec
- Region: Lanaudière
- RCM: Matawinie
- Settled: 1863
- Constituted: March 3, 1979

Government
  - Mayor: Mario Venne
  - Federal riding: Joliette—Manawan
  - Prov. riding: Berthier

Area
  - Total: 568.00 km^{2} (219.31 sq mi)
  - Land: 501.28 km^{2} (193.55 sq mi)

Population (2011)
  - Total: 2,436
  - Density: 4.9/km^{2} (13/sq mi)
  - Pop 2006-2011: ▼10.2%
  - Dwellings: 1,990
- Time zone: UTC−5 (EST)
  - Summer (DST): UTC−4 (EDT)
- Postal code(s): J0K 3B0
- Area codes: 450 and 579
- Highways: R-131
- Website: www.saintmichel dessaints.com

Saint-Michel-des-Saints (French pronunciation: [sɛ̃ miʃɛl de sɛ̃]) is a municipality in the Matawinie Regional County Municipality of Quebec, Canada. Agriculture, forestry, recreation, and tourism have been the main activities found within this region.

== History ==
In 1863, Thomas-Léandre Brassard settled near the falls of Pine Lake (Lac des Pins) where he built a mill and a manor. Three years later, there were 136 inhabitants. In 1870, the post office opened. By 1883, the Parish of Saint-Michel-des-Saints was officially formed and followed two years later in 1885 by the formation of the parish municipality. The name Saint-Michel-des-Saints, chosen by Ignace Bourget at the suggestion of Father Brassard, honours Michael de Sanctis who lived from 1591 to 1625.

In 1929, the dam on the Matawin River was constructed that would result in the formation of the Taureau Reservoir. This reservoir drowned the neighbouring village of Saint-Ignace-du-Lac (founded in 1877) and so that municipality was annexed by Saint-Michel-des-Saints in 1931, thereby increasing its territory by about 15 square kilometres (5.8 sq mi).

In 1979, the Parish Municipality of Saint-Michel-des-Saints and the United Township Municipality of Masson-et-Laviolette (founded in 1914) were merged to form the new Municipality of Saint-Michel-des-Saints.

In 2018, a flood occurred in late April and early May.

== Geography ==
Saint-Michel-des-Saints is the largest and northernmost municipality in the Lanaudière region (not considering the unorganized territories). The village itself is located at the northern end of Quebec Route 131 along the Matawin River, near the south-western corner of Taureau Reservoir.

The larger lakes in the municipality include Durand, Beauséjour, Hazen, and Kaiagamac. These and the many other ones attract many summer cottage vacationers. The area's forests are popular for hunting and trapping.

== Demographics ==
=== Population ===
In the 2011 Census, Statistics Canada originally reported that Saint-Michel-des-Saints had a population of 2,201 living in 979 of its 1,774 total dwellings, an 18.9% change from its 2006 population of 2,713. Statistics Canada subsequently amended the 2011 census results to a population of 2,436 living in 1,084 of its 1,990 total dwellings, a -10.2% change from 2006. With a land area of 501.28 km^{2} (193.55 sq mi), it had a population density of 4.8596/km^{2} (12.5862/sq mi) in 2011.

Historical Census Data - Saint-Michel-des-Saints, Quebec

Year	Pop.	±%
1991	2,275	—
1996	2,339	+2.8%
2001	2,414	+3.2%

Year	Pop.	±%
2006	2,713	+12.4%
2011	2,436	−10.2%

=== Language ===
Mother tongue:

- English as first language: 1.5%
- French as first language: 95.7%
- English and French as first language: 0.4%
- Other as first language: 2.4%

== Education ==
Commission scolaire des Samares operates francophone public schools:

- École secondaire des Montagnes
- École Saint-Jean-Baptiste

The Sir Wilfrid Laurier School Board operates anglophone public schools serving the community at the secondary level, including:

- Joliette High School in Joliette

== Cultural twinning ==
Saint-Michel-des-Saints is twinned with the community of Saint-Varent in the Deux-Sèvres department in western France.

== See also ==
- List of municipalities in Quebec
- Mauricie
- Matawin River
- Regional Park of Taureau Lake
- Lanaudière
- Matawinie
