= Michael de Sanctis =

Spanish saint (1591–1625)

Saint Michael de Sanctis
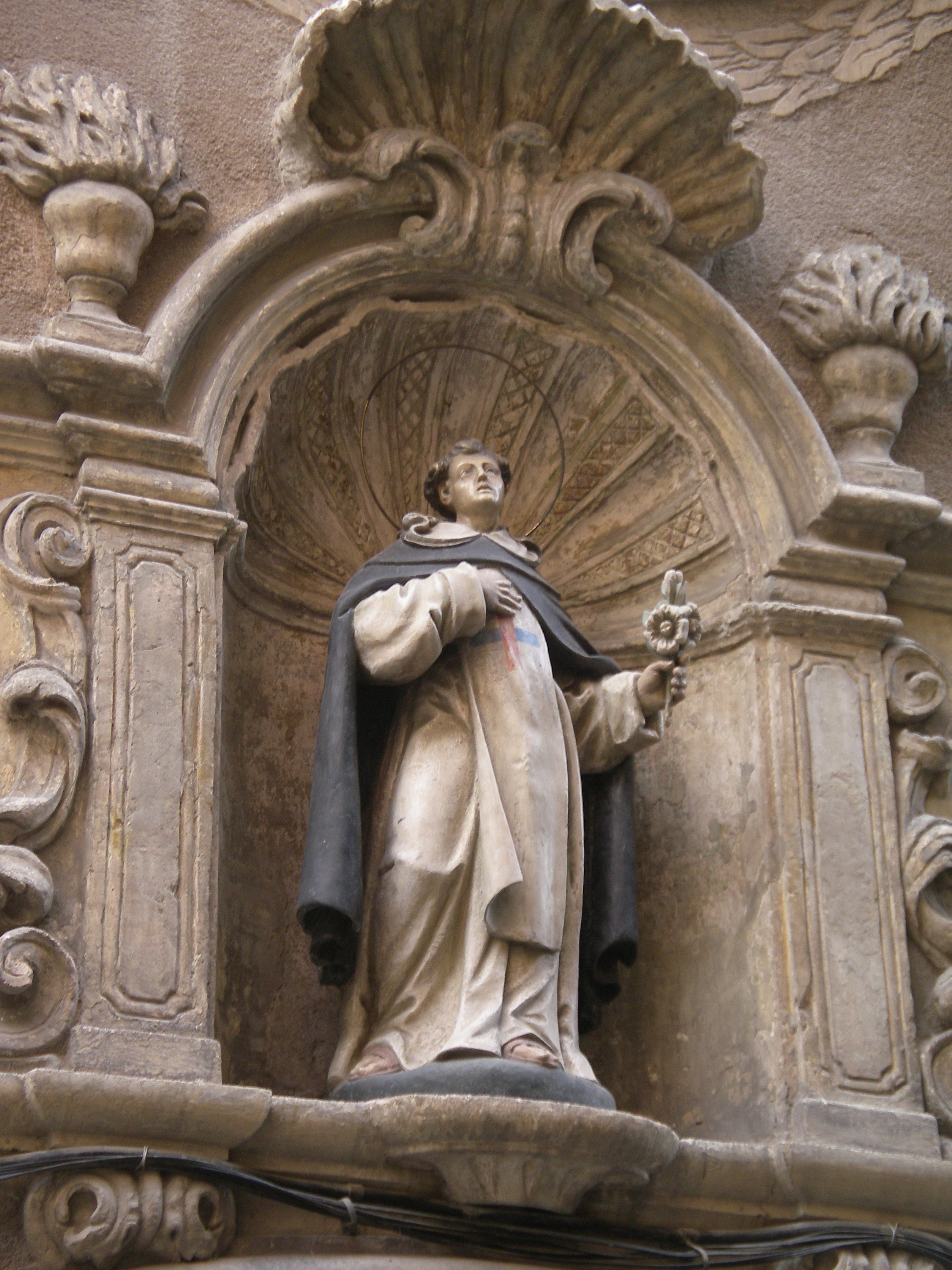
- Michael de Sanctis; sculpture of the 18th century at his native home chapel.

Confessor
- Born: 29 September 1591; Vic, Catalonia, Kingdom of Spain
- Died: 10 April 1625 (aged 33); Valladolid, Old Castile, Kingdom of Spain
- Venerated in: Roman Catholic Church
- Beatified: 24 May 1779, Rome by Pope Pius VI
- Canonized: 8 June 1862, Rome by Pope Pius IX
- Major shrine: Vic (birth house, now a chapel); Valladolid Trinitarian church (grave)
- Feast: 10 April
- Attributes: depicted kneeling before an altar where the Blessed Sacrament is exposed.
- Patronage: cancer patients, Vic

Michael de Sanctis (Catalan: Miquel dels Sants) (29 September 1591 – 10 April 1625), sometimes called Michael of the Saints, was a Discalced Trinitarian born in Vic, a city of Catalonia, Spain.

== Life ==
Born Michael Argemir, at Vic, Catalonia, his parents died while he was still young, and he was apprenticed to a merchant. At the age of twelve, he came to Barcelona and asked to be received into the monastery of the Trinitarians there. After a three-year novitiate, he took his vows at that order's monastery of St. Lambert at Zaragoza in 1607.

After meeting a Discalced Trinitarian one day, he felt drawn to that congregation's more austere lifestyle and, after much deliberation and the permission of his superior, he entered the congregation of the Discalced Trinitarians at Madrid as a novice. He studied at Seville and Salamanca. He then took his vows at Alcalá, became a priest, and was twice elected superior of the monastery at Valladolid, where he died April 10, 1625.

During his life, Michael de Sanctis led a life of prayer and mortification. He was devout towards the Holy Eucharist, and is said to have been experienced ecstasies several times during Consecration.

Michael De Sanctis was beatified by Pope Pius VI on 24 May 1779 and later canonized by Pope Pius IX on 8 June 1862. In the Roman Martyrology, he is described as "remarkable for innocence of life, wonderful penitence, and love for God. His feast day is celebrated on 10 April.

In images, he is usually depicted kneeling before an altar where the Blessed Sacrament is exposed.

The municipality of Saint-Michel-des-Saints, Quebec, Canada, is named in his honor.
