= Mastigouche Wildlife Reserve =

Wildlife reserve in Quebec, Canada

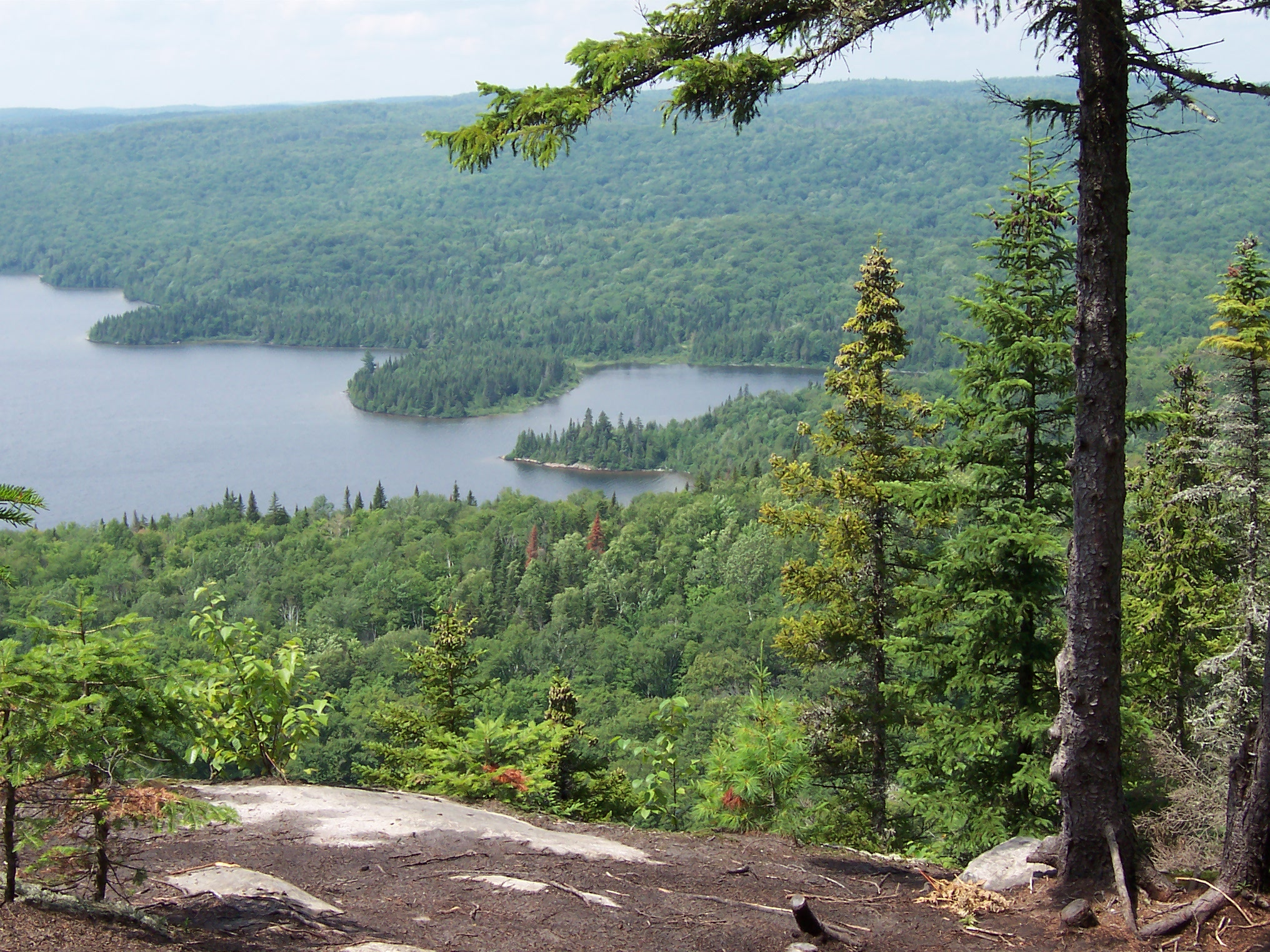
- Lac Saint-Bernard

- Location within Quebec
- Location: Maskinongé Regional County Municipality, Matawinie and D'Autray, Quebec, Canada
- Nearest city: Joliette
- Coordinates: 46°40′00″N 73°30′00″W
- Area: 1,556.8 square kilometres (601.1 sq mi)
- Created: 1971
- Administrator: Sépaq
- Website: Official Site

The Mastigouche Wildlife Reserve is a Quebec Wildlife Reserve located in the administrative regions of the Mauricie and Lanaudière, Quebec, in Canada. Comprising 1556 square kilometres, it includes 417 lakes and 13 rivers. Like all wildlife reserves, this area is dedicated to the conservation, development and use of wildlife as well as recreational activities. It is however not considered a protected area, because forest and mining activities are being allowed. The reserve is managed by Sépaq which offers camping and equipment rentals.

== Toponymy ==
The name of the reserve is derived from the Mastigouche Hunting and Fishing club, which was established in 1881. The name comes from the Atikamekw or the Algonquin (language) and mean "where the woods are small".

== History ==
The first private hunting club concession in Mastigouche was awarded to Élisabeth Copeland de Berthier in 1881. Two other large clubs were later created in the territory which were the Saint Bernard Club and the Commodore. These clubs mainly catered to wealthy American members.

In 1971, the Quebec government decided to democratize access to hunting and fishing. It terminated the leases of private hunting and fishing clubs and grouped them to create the reserve under the name "Mastigouche Park Reserve". In 1979, it took its present name "Mastigouche Wildlife Reserve".

== Geography ==
The reserve is located 95 km northwest of Trois-Rivières and 145 km northeast of Montreal, Quebec. It can be accessed via Saint-Alexis-des-Monts in Mauricie or Saint-Zénon and Mandeville, in Lanaudière.

The reserve includes the Marie-Jean-Eudes Ecological Reserve and the proposed biodiversity reserve of the Basses-Collines-du-Lac-au-Sorcier. It also shares boundaries with the La Mauricie National Park to the east, to the ZEC du Chapeau-de-Paille to the north and ZEC des Nymphes to the west.

== Features ==
According to Sépaq, the main attractions of the park are:

- The Six Waterfall Trail
- The Maubèche Waterfall
- The wooded campground and beach at Lac Saint-Bernard

The popular fishing destination Lac Sorcier is so-named because of a legendary sorcerer that haunts the woods around the lake, keeping visitors awake at night with strange calls.

== Wildlife ==
The reserve is home to over 30 mammal species, including white-tailed deer, wolf, lynx, moose, American black bear, and hare. Among the birds found in the park, there are golden eagle, osprey, ruffed grouse, and common loon.

== Fishing ==
According to Sépaq, the reserve has 18 main fishing lakes containing bass, northern pike, walleye, musky, lake trout, brook trout, rainbow trout and arctic char. Landlocked Atlantic salmon can be still be found in Lac Sorcier. Originating from Lac Saint-Jean, the species was also introduced by club members into Lac Saint-Bernard and Lac Sans Bout by club members in the 1920s.

== Gallery ==
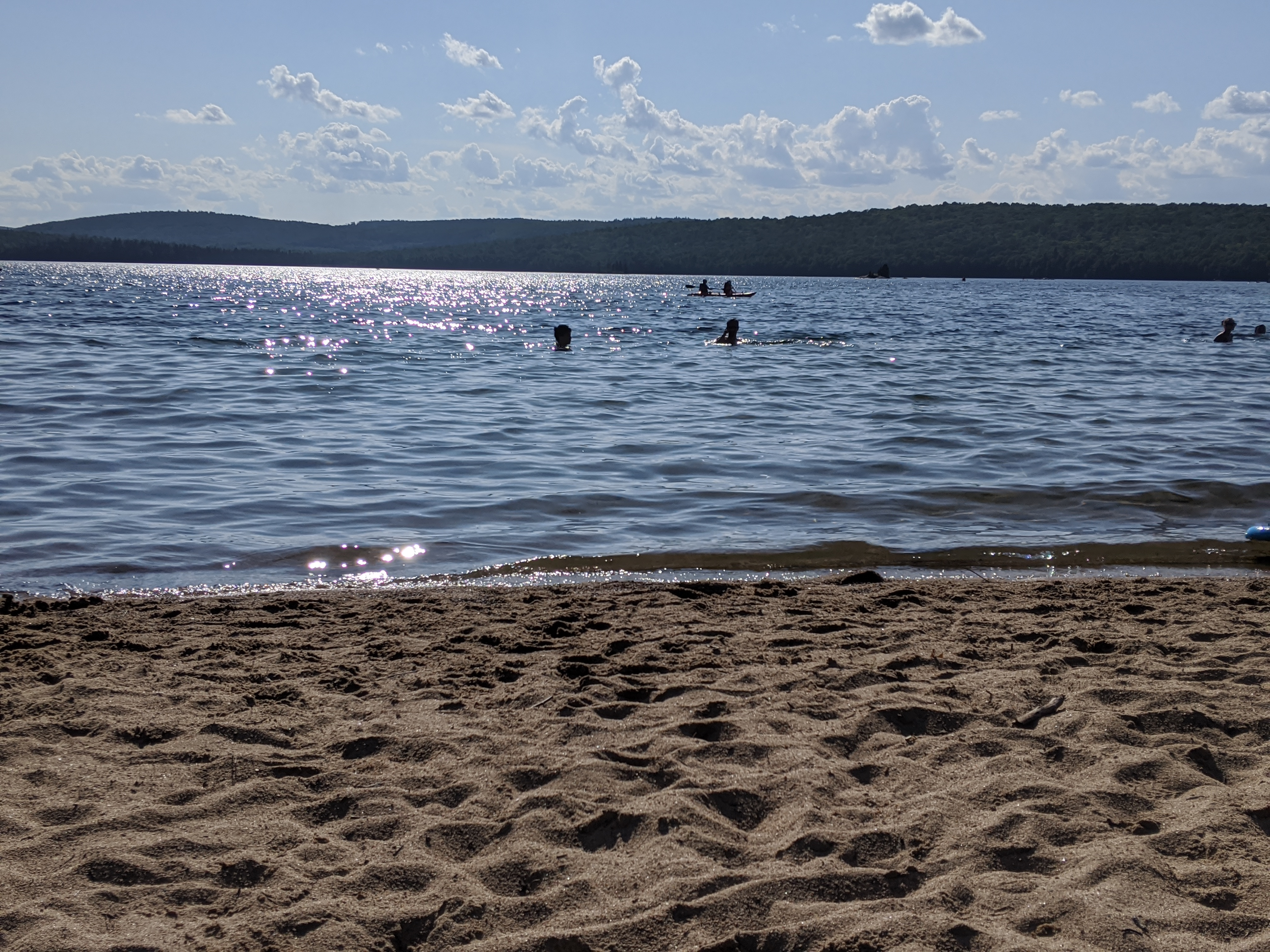
Beach at Lac Saint-Bernard

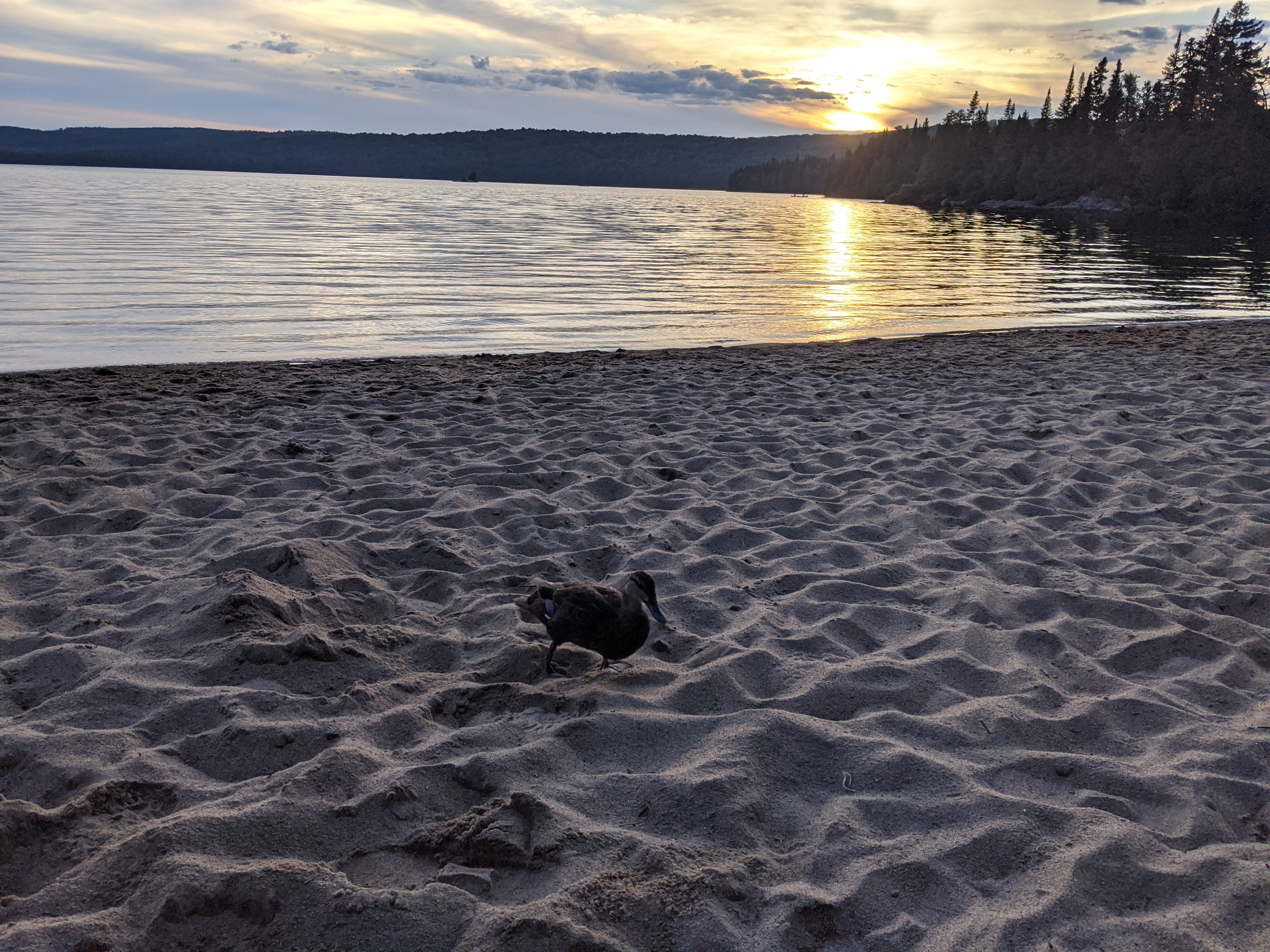
Duck on the beach at Lac Saint-Bernard at sunset

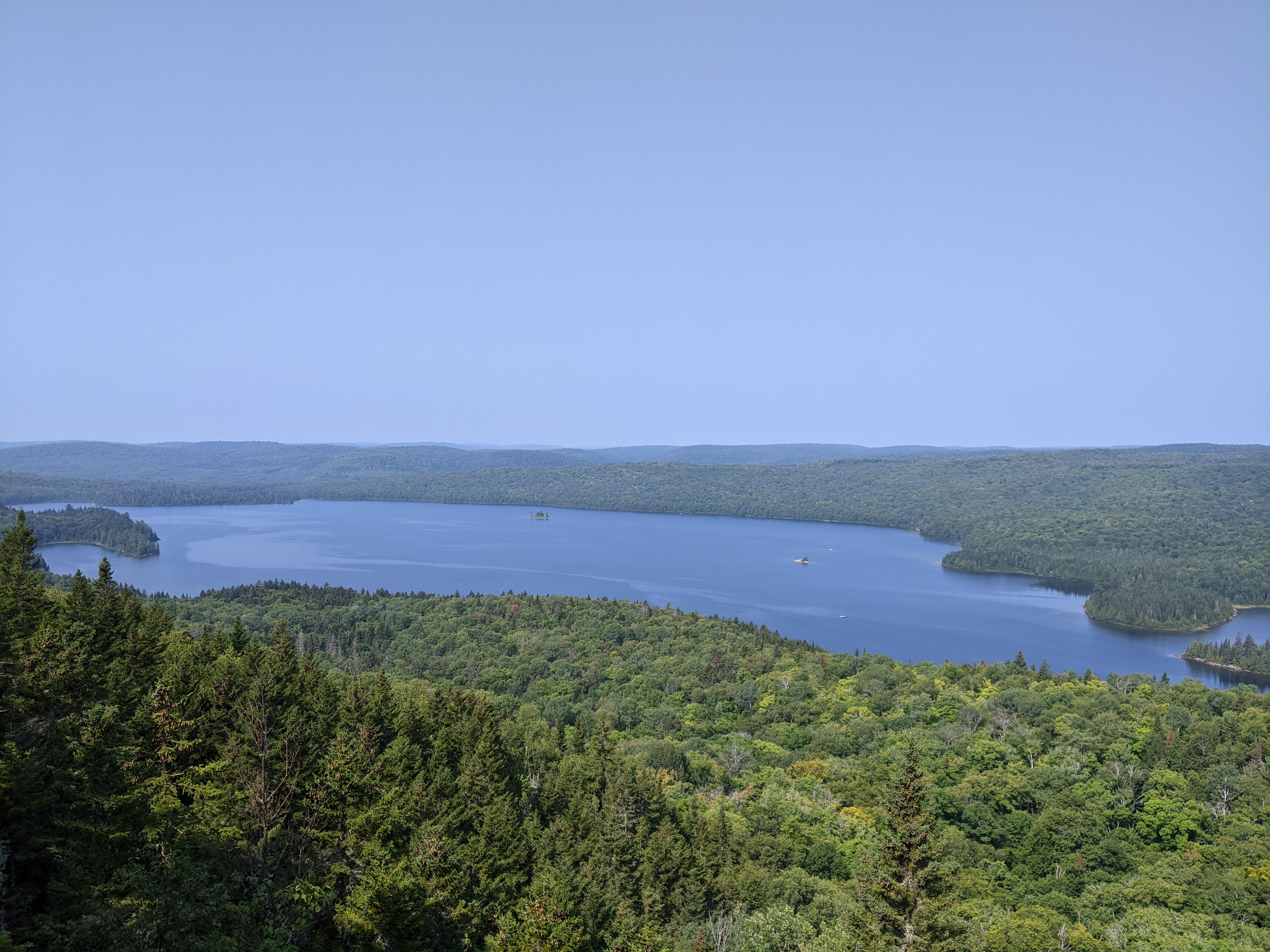
Lac Saint Bernard viewed from La Falaise trail

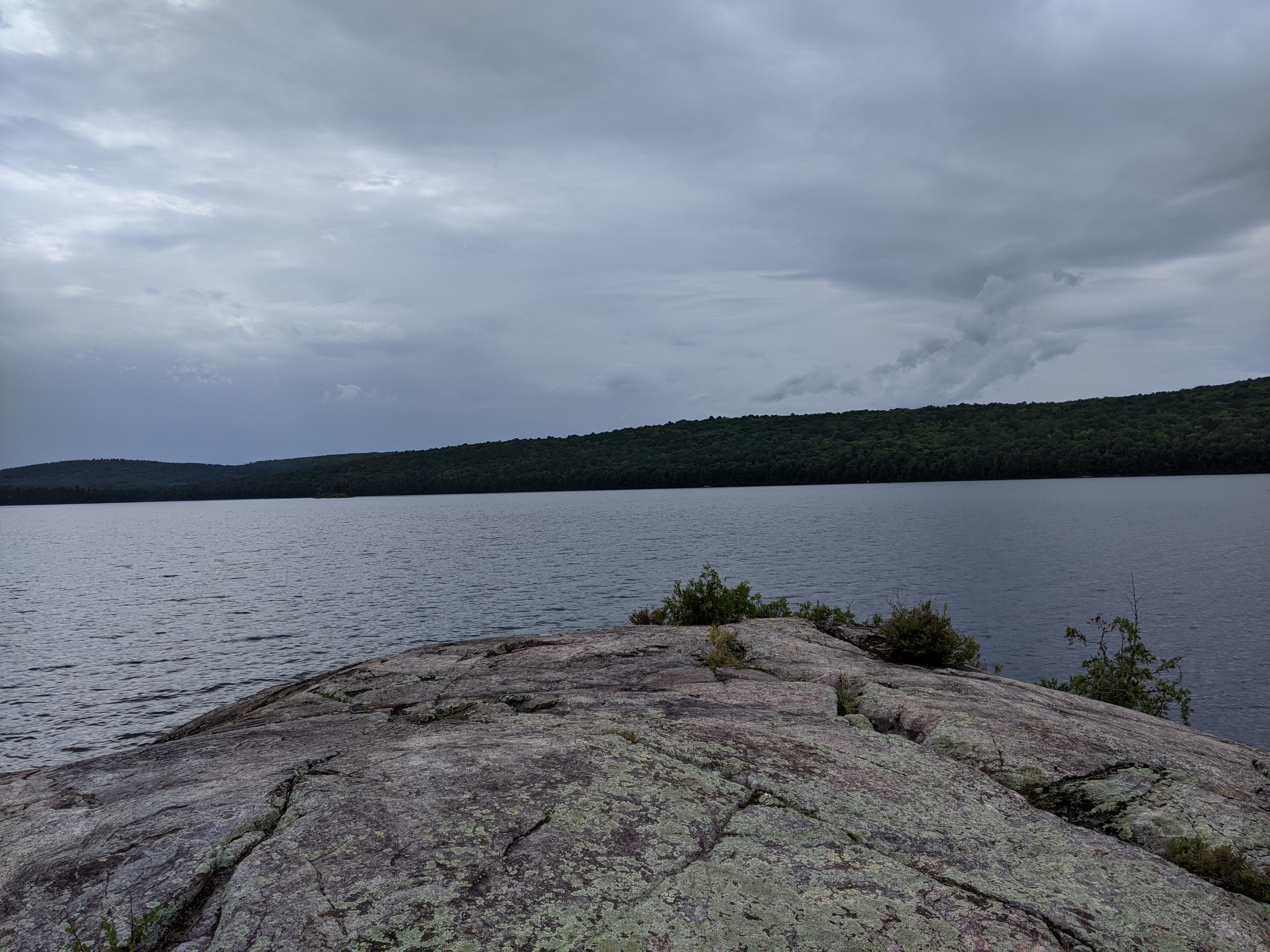
view from the island in B Lac Saint-Bernard

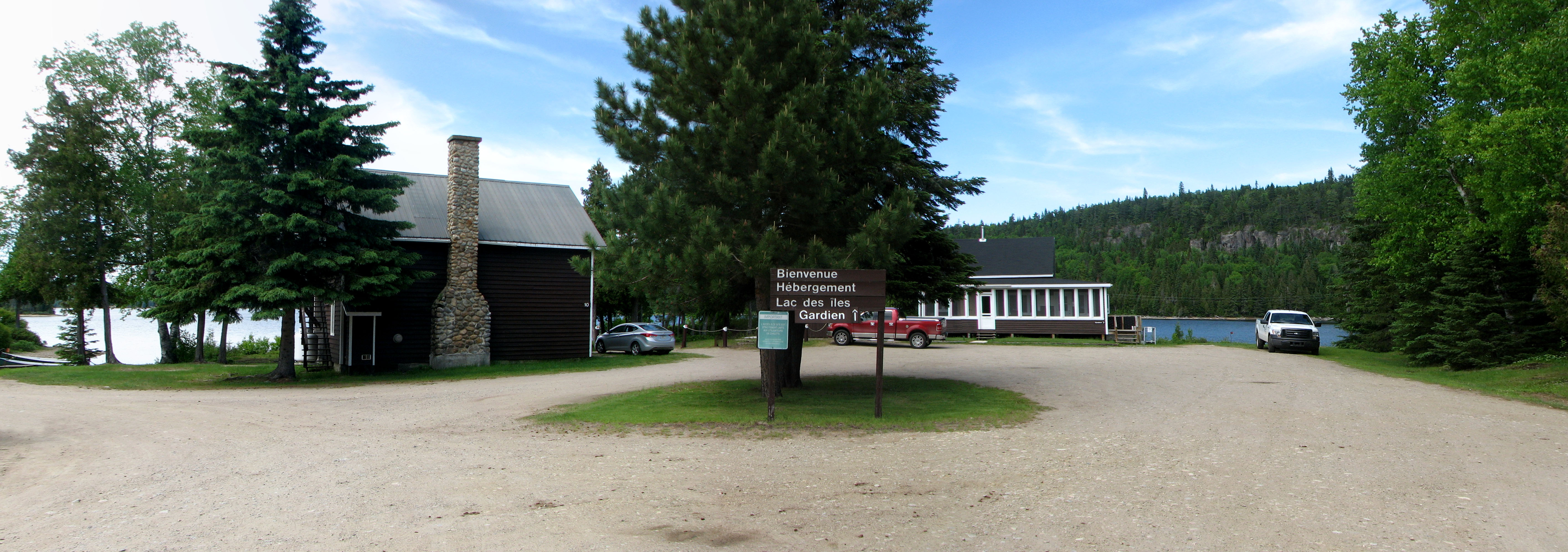
Welcome Centre at Grand-Lac-des-Îles

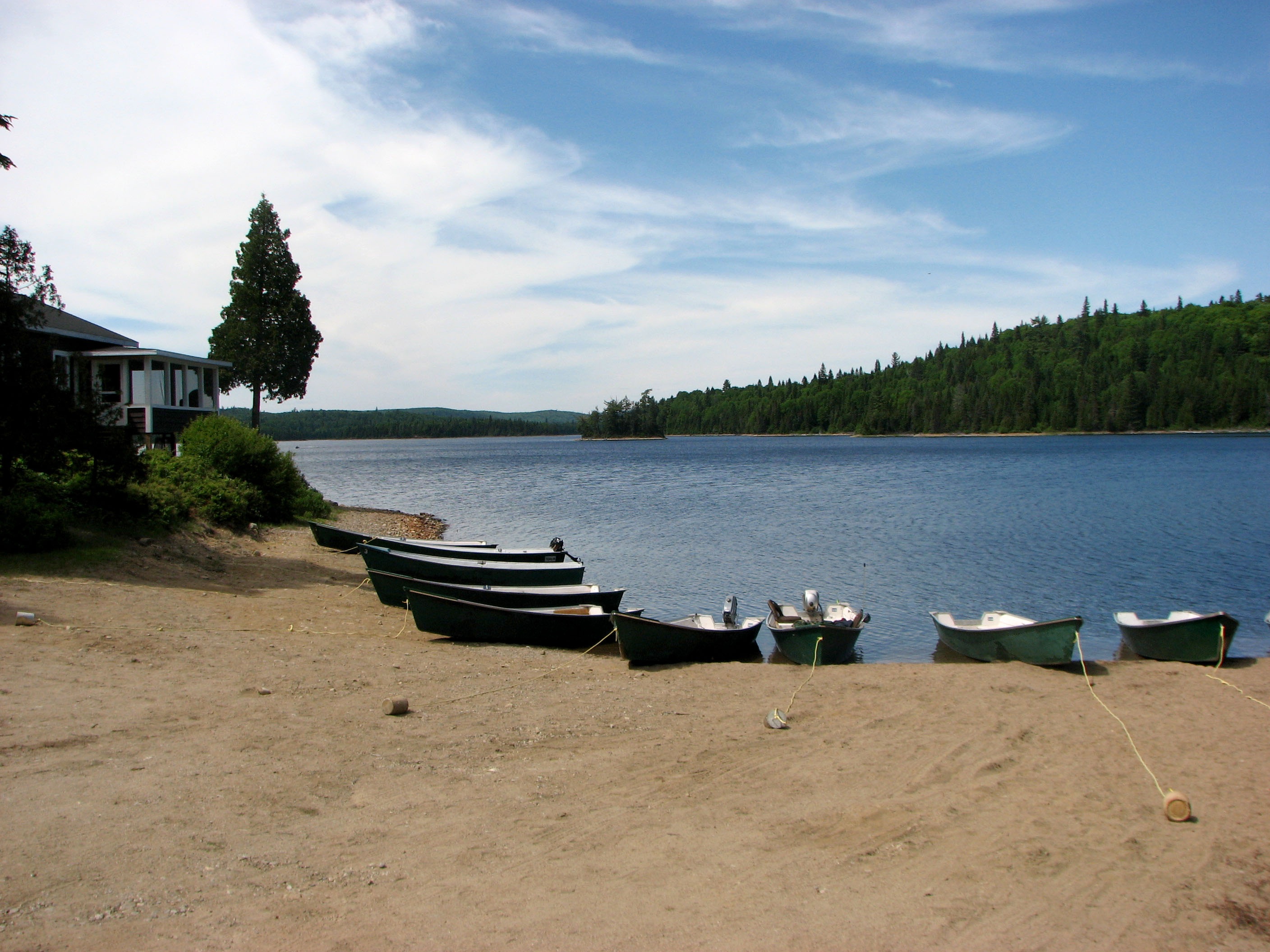
Boat Launch at Grand-Lac-des-Îles

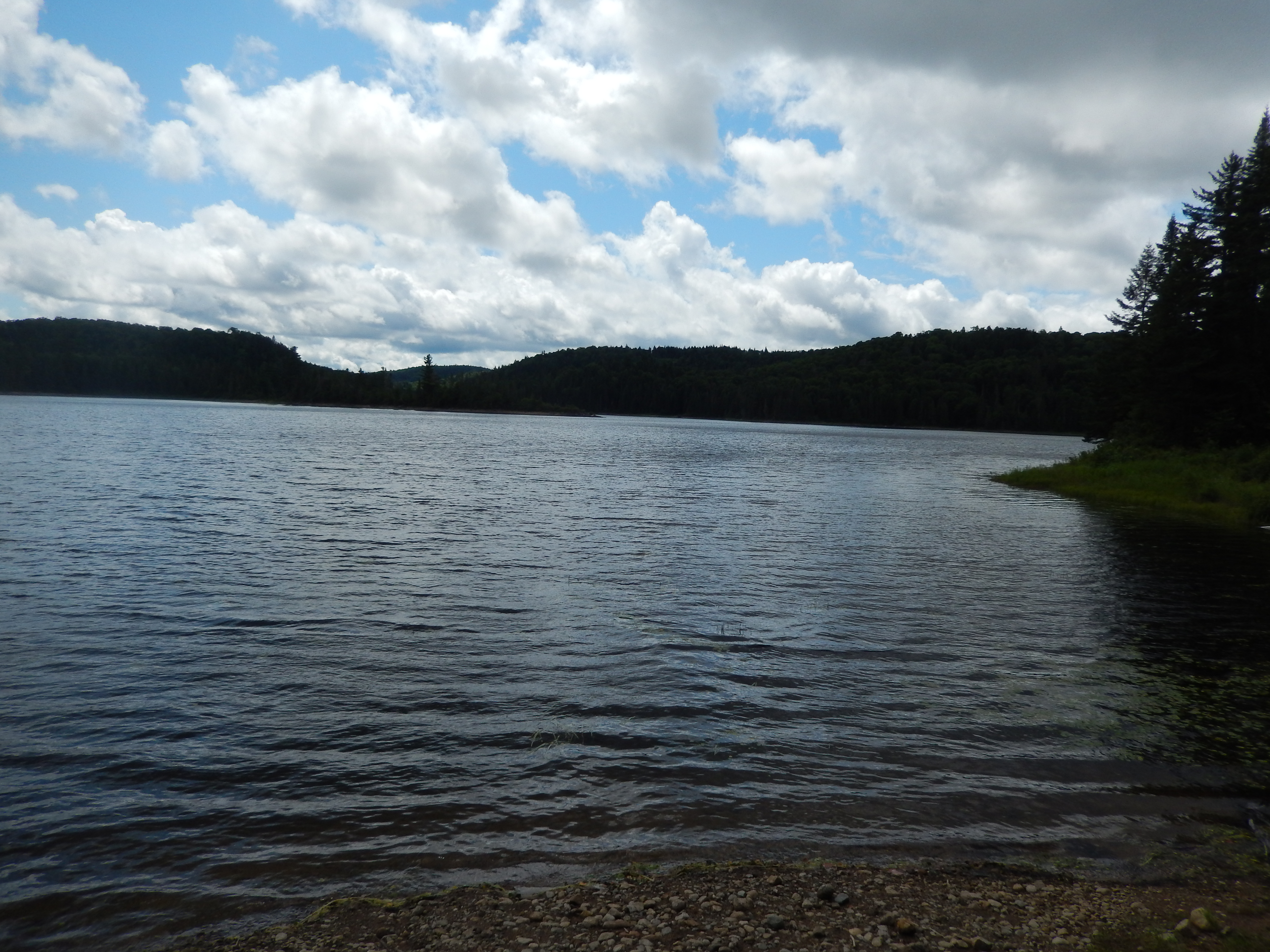
Lac Sans Bout

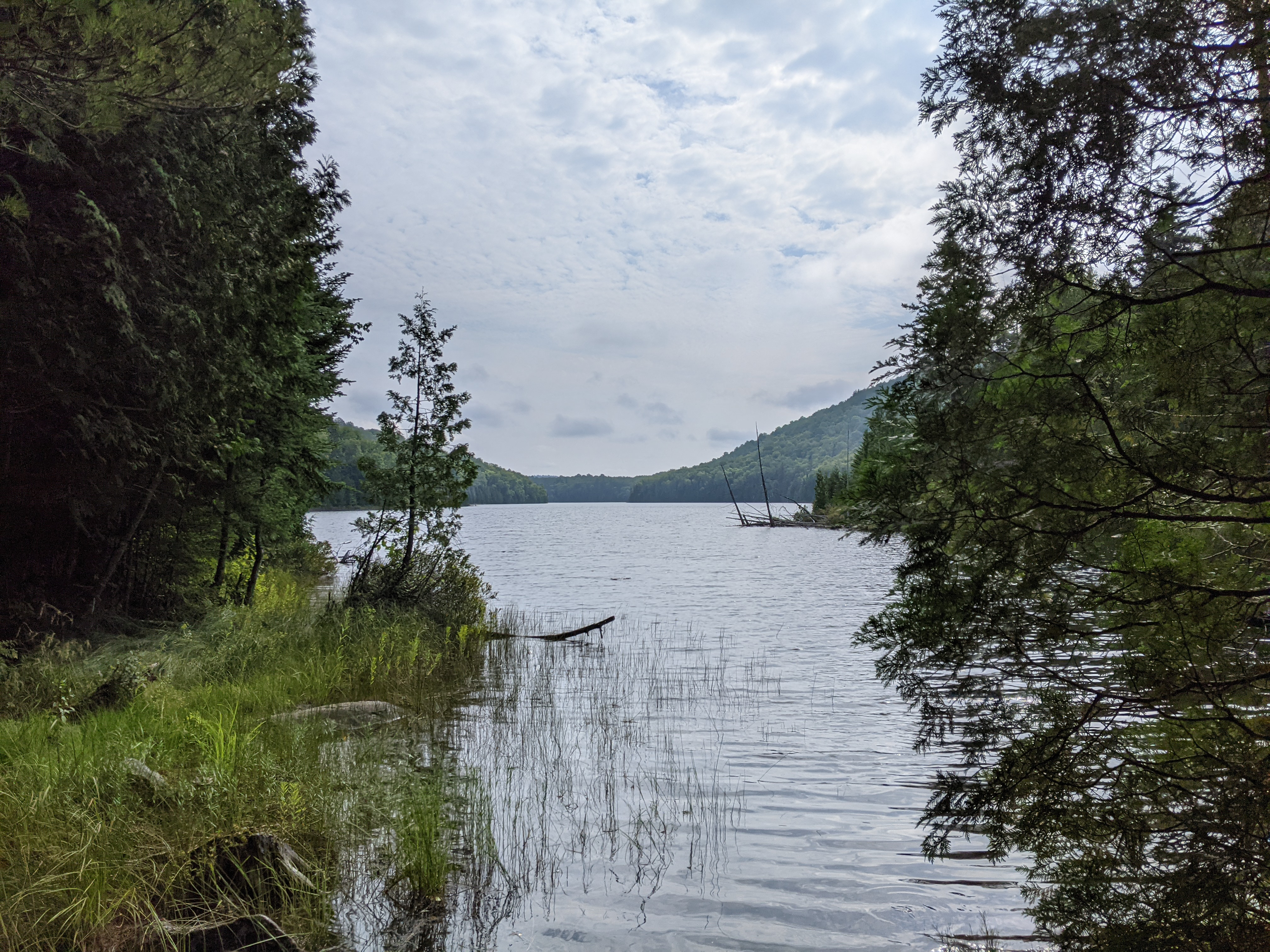
Lac Livernoche from the trail at Camping Lac Saint-Bernard
