= Baie-de-la-Bouteille =

- Unorganized territory
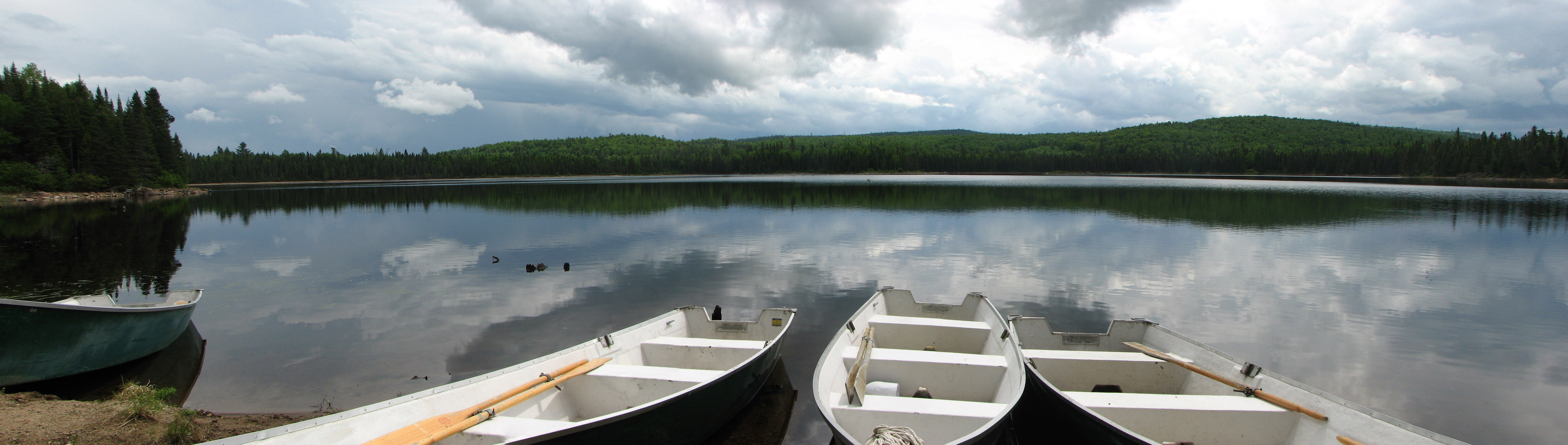

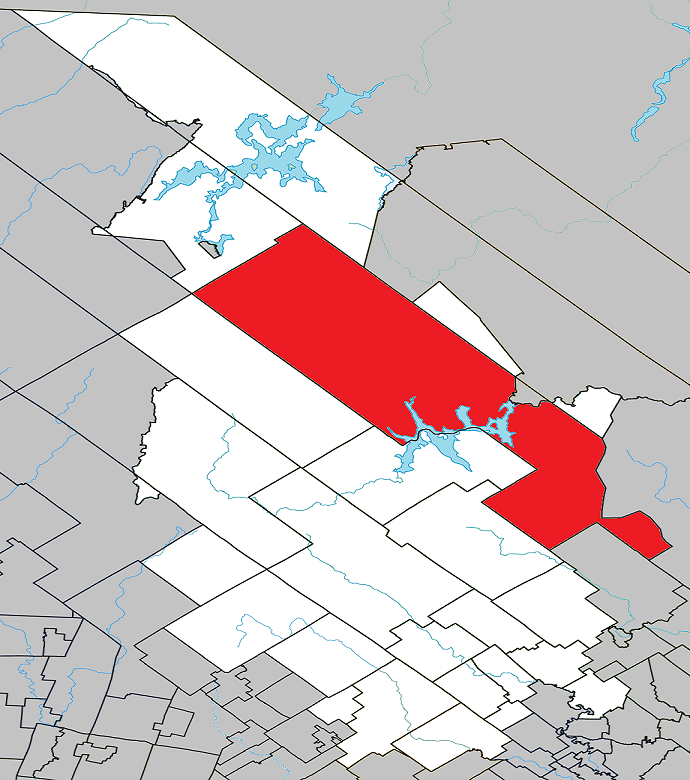
- Location within Matawinie RCM

- Location in central Quebec
- Coordinates: 46°46′N 73°40′W
- Country: Canada
- Province: Quebec
- Region: Lanaudière
- RCM: Matawinie
- Constituted: January 1, 1986

Government
  - Fed. riding: Joliette—Manawan
  - Prov. riding: Berthier

Area
  - Total: 2,179.99 km^{2} (841.70 sq mi)
  - Land: 1,938.18 km^{2} (748.34 sq mi)

Population (2021)
  - Total: 10
  - Density: 0/km^{2} (0/sq mi)
  - Change 2016-21: ▲100%
  - Dwellings: 17
- Time zone: UTC−5 (EST)
  - Summer (DST): UTC−4 (EDT)
- Highways: No major routes

Baie-de-la-Bouteille (French pronunciation: [bɛ də la butɛj]) is an unorganized territory in the Lanaudière region of Quebec, Canada, part of the Matawinie Regional County Municipality. It is named after Bottle Bay (French: Baie de la Bouteille) of Taureau Reservoir.

== Demographics ==
Historical census populations – Baie-de-la-Bouteille
| Year | Pop. | ±% |
|---|---|---|
| 1996 | 7 | — |
| 2001 | 5 | −28.6% |
| 2006 | 5 | +0.0% |
| 2011 | 5 | +0.0% |
| 2016 | 5 | +0.0% |
| 2021 | 10 | +100.0% |
Population counts are not adjusted for boundary changes. Source: Statistics Canada

== See also ==
- List of unorganized territories in Quebec
