= Taureau Reservoir =

Reservoir in Quebec

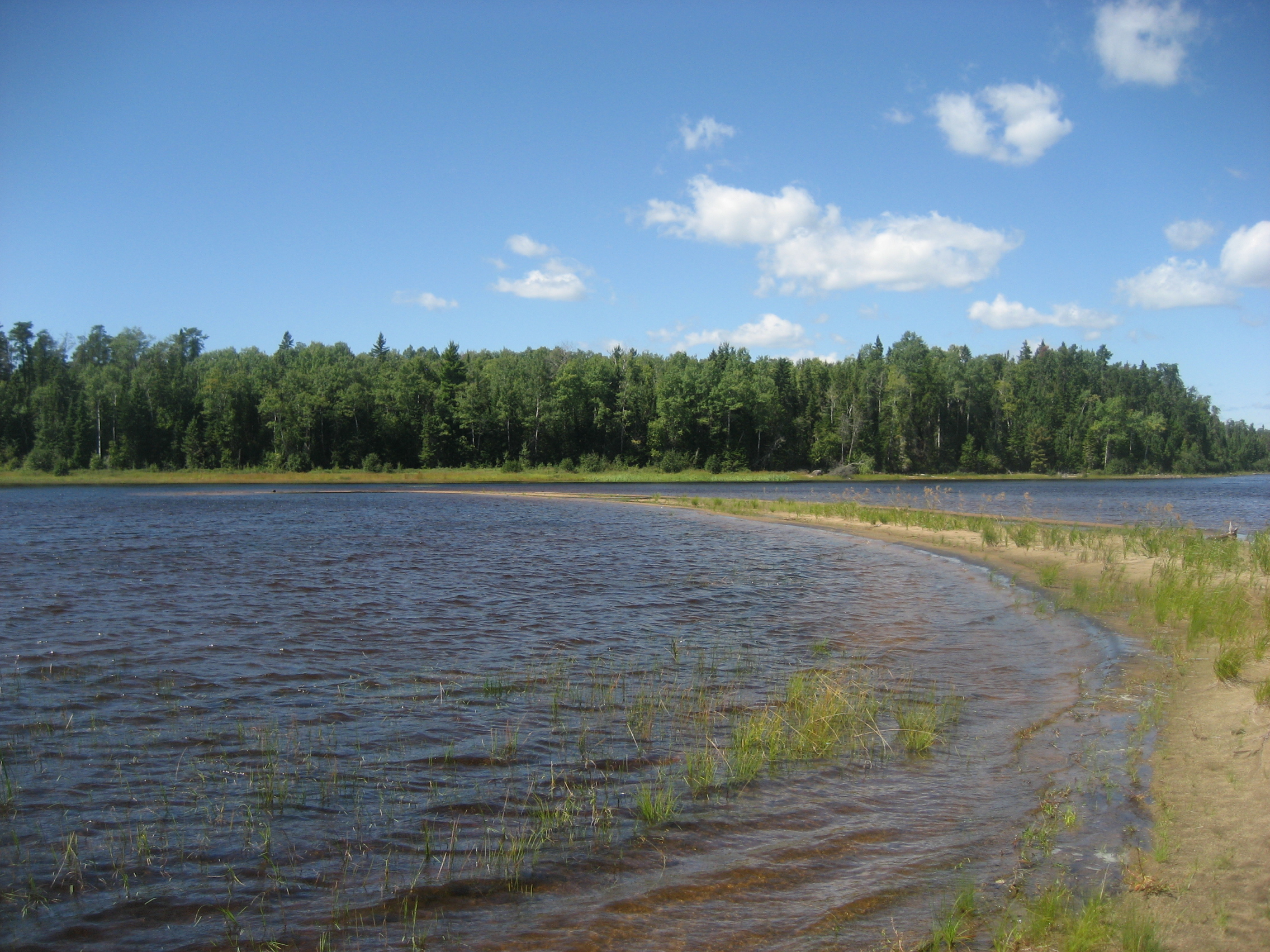

- Location in Quebec
- Location: Lanaudière, Quebec
- Coordinates: 46°45′59″N 73°50′00″W
- Type: reservoir
- Part of: Saint Lawrence River drainage basin
- River sources: Matawin River
- Basin countries: Canada
- First flooded: 1931
- Surface area: 95 km^{2} (37 sq mi)
- Surface elevation: 356 m (1,168 ft)
- Islands: 45; Lacroix Island, Island Village

The Taurus Reservoir is a 95-square-kilometre (37 sq mi) reservoir in Matawinie, in the administrative region of Lanaudière, Québec, Canada. It is in the Saint Lawrence River drainage basin and is on the Matawin River.

== Toponymy ==
The reservoir is named after a river rapid that was flooded in 1931 by the damming of Matawin River by Shawinigan Water and Power. The noise of the latter was reminiscent of the bellowing of a bull.

== Geography ==
This large lake has 239.4 kilometres (148.8 mi) of banks including many sandy beaches, including the beach of Pointe-fine located at the end of a peninsula that just into the centre of the lake. Sandy shores of "Baie du milieu" (bay of the Middle), and "des Embranchements" and "du Poste" attract wilderness camping and swimming fans.

The Matawin River flows into the "Taureau reservoir" on the west side, and resumed its course at the outlet of the lake (eastern side) controlled by the "Matawin dam", erected at the end of the "Bay of the dam" at an altitude of 356.58 metres (1,169.9 ft).

Taureau reservoir has 45 islands; the most important are:

- Western Lake: "îles jaune" (Yellow Island), "aux grands vents" (high winds), "aux Sables", "de la chauche" and Barineau,
- Central part: Islands France, "flottantes" (floating), "Grande Île Jumelle" (Big Island Twin), "Îles jumelles" (Twin Islands), "du village" and West Island,
- East part: Lacroix Island (the largest in area) and the island of grey pine.

Taureau Reservoir has three main parts (each has a north–south orientation) connected by a narrow passage. Each part has several large bays:

- Western Lake: "baies du Poste" (berries of the Post), "du Milieu" (Middle) and Village,
- Central part: "baies du canot rouge" (berries red canoe bay), "de ROE" and "Ignace",
- Part is: "baies du Barrage" (bay of the Dam) and "de la Bouteille" (Bottle).

== See also ==
- Matawin River
- Regional Park of Taureau Lake
- Matawinie
- Lanaudière
