= Shawinigan River =

Rivière Shawinigan Petite rivière Shawinigan, Shawinigan River, Little Shawinigan River
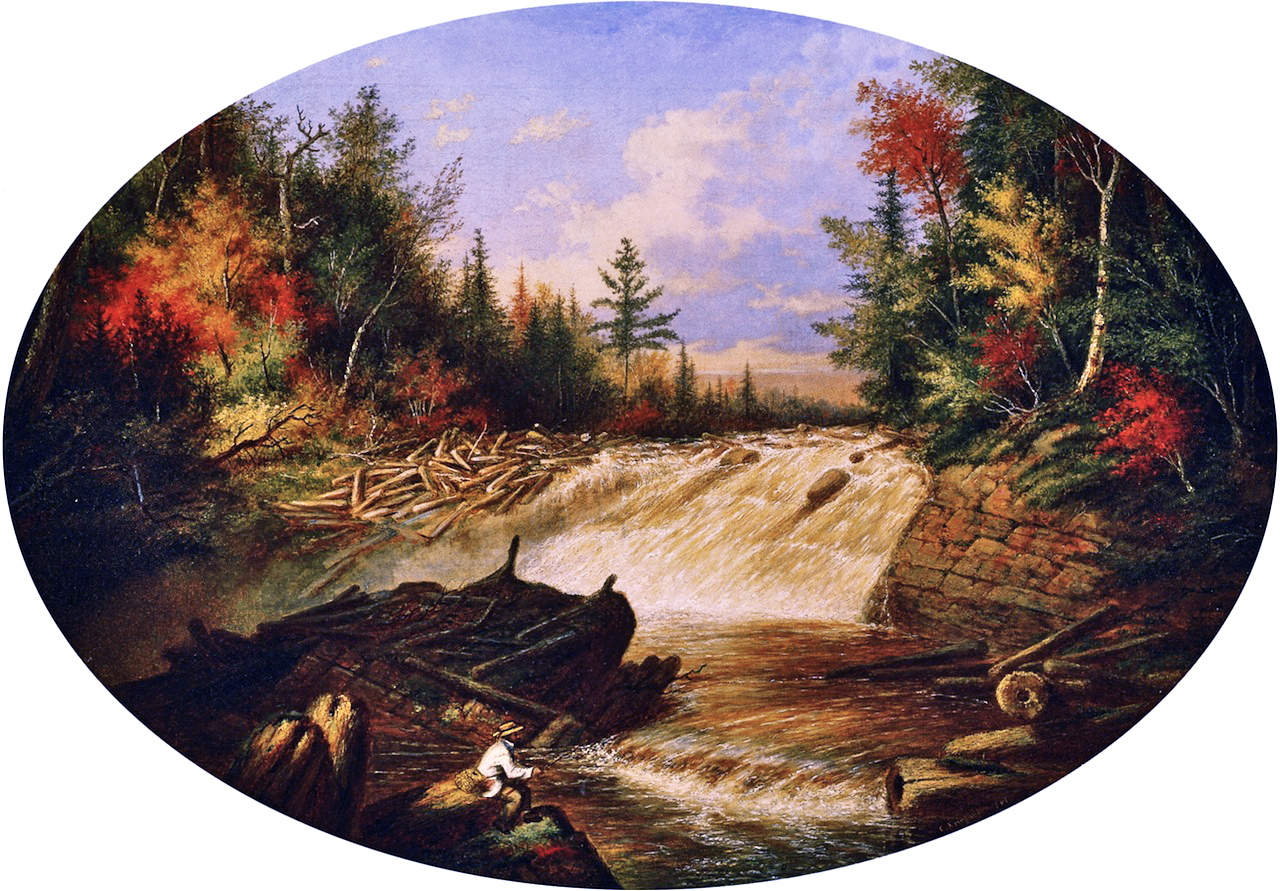
- A painting by Cornelius Krieghoff, showing one of the waterfalls along the Shawinigan

Location
- Country: Canada
- Region: Saint-Mathieu-du-Parc, Shawinigan, Mauricie

Physical characteristics
- Source
  - location: Areas in and near La Mauricie National Park
- Mouth
  - location: Confluence with the Saint-Maurice in the baie de Shawinigan
  - coordinates: 46.53833°N 72.76889°W

Basin features
- Progression: Shawinigan—Saint-Maurice—Saint Lawrence—Atlantic Ocean

The rivière Shawinigan flows in the rural area to the north of Shawinigan, then through the town of Shawinigan, in Mauricie, in Quebec, in Canada. The Shawinigan is a tributary of the right bank of the Saint-Maurice.

== Geography ==
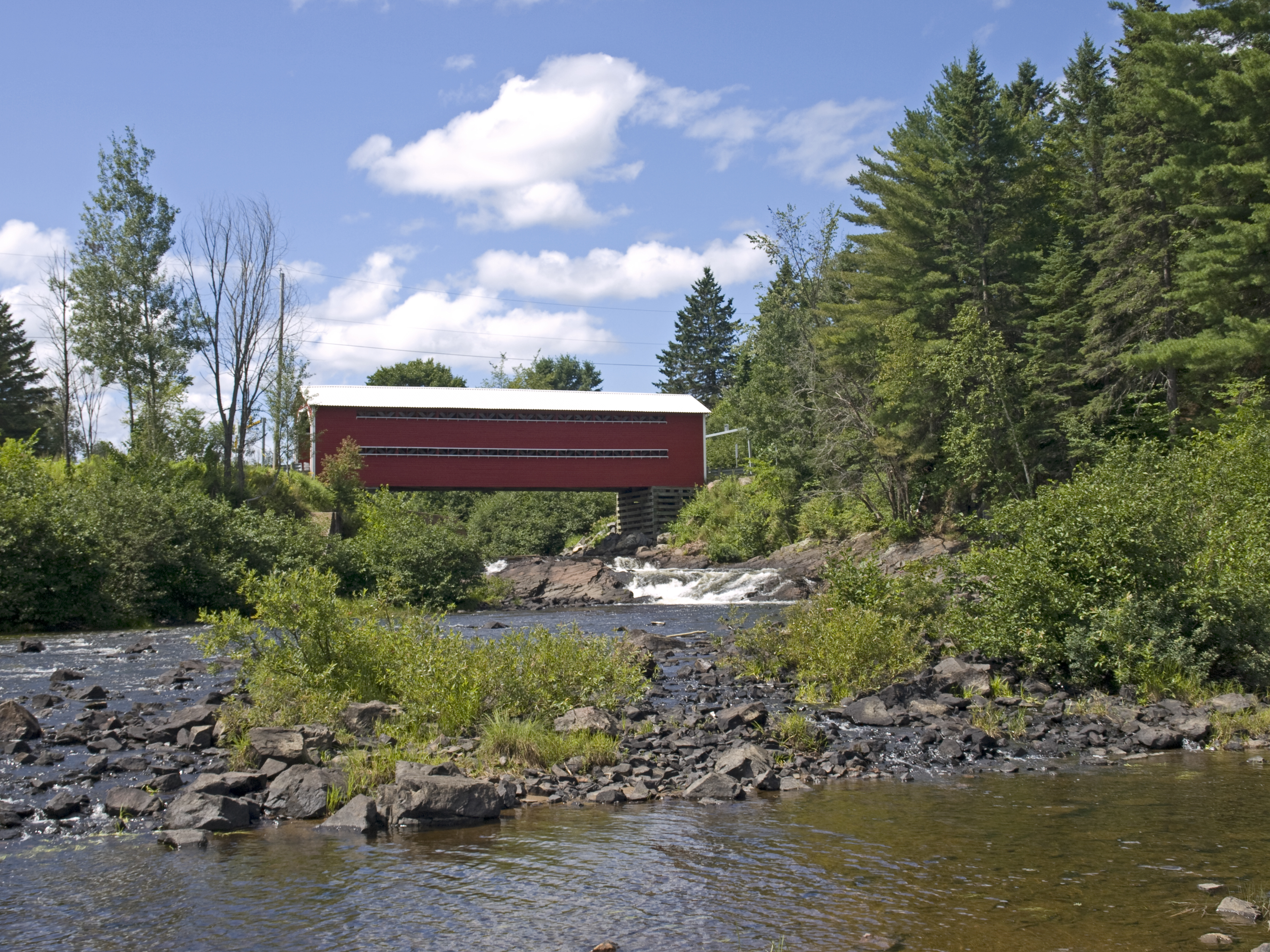
Pont de Saint-Mathieu covered bridge across the river

The Shawinigan flows through forested areas, agricultural and urban (at the end of his course). At its head, it drains some lakes including lac Barnard (in Maskinongé Regional County Municipality), lac Wapizagonke and other water bodies in the southern zone the La Mauricie National Park.

On its way, its waters flow at first to southbound across the "chutes du diable" falls, then eastward, sometimes following a serpentine path. Then, the river crosses the Saint-Gérard sector (in Shawinigan) where the river veers to the south. Then the river flows in south-westerly direction along the Quebec Autoroute 55, where a drop creates waterfalls. Nearby, an observation deck was erected. Finally, the river flows into the baie de Shawinigan, where it meets the Saint-Maurice at the foot of the Shawinigan hydroelectric complex.

Main bridges spanning the river (from the mouth):

1. Route 153 (Boulevard Pie-XII Coast and Bay)
2. Route 351 (Trudel street)
3. Quebec Autoroute 55
4. Rue Bellevue, in Shawinigan
5. Rue de la Montagne
6. Chemin Principal
7. Route 351-Main Road
8. Route 351-Main Road
9. Path Terrace Falls
10. Small road segment (linking the path of Terrace and the way St. Francis)
11. Chemin Saint-François (1st bridge)
12. Chemin Saint-François (2nd bridge)
13. Chemin Saint-François (3rd bridge)

== Toponymy ==
The name "Rivière Shawinigan" was registered on December 5, 1968, in the bank of place names of the Geographical Names Board of Canada.
