= Wapizagonke Lake =

Lake in Quebec, Canada

Lake Wapizagonke
- Lac Wapizagonke
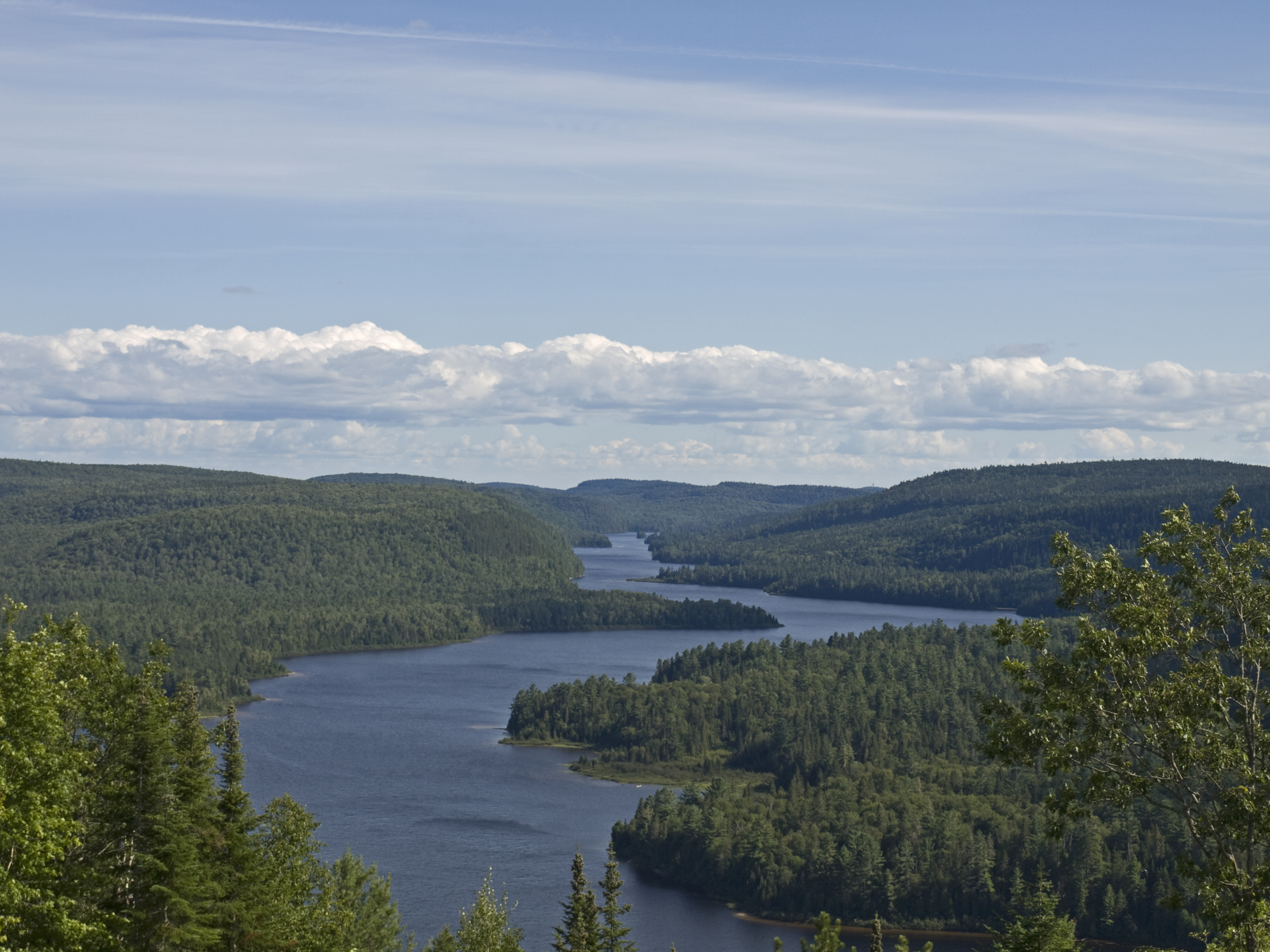
- Panorama of the lake

- Location within Quebec
- Location: Mauricie region, north of Shawinigan, Quebec
- Coordinates: 46°43′21.8″N 73°02′00″W
- Type: natural
- Primary outflows: Shawinigan River
- Catchment area: St. Lawrence River
- Basin countries: Canada
- Max. length: 9.2 km (5.7 mi)
- Settlements: Shawinigan

The Wapizagonke Lake is one of the bodies of water located the sector "Lac-Wapizagonke", in the city of Shawinigan, in the La Mauricie National Park, in the region of Mauricie, in Quebec, in Canada.

== Geography ==
With a length of 9.2 kilometers, the Wapizagonke lake is located near the west boundary of La Mauricie National Park in northern Shawinigan. Surrounded by mountains, this lake is a narrow shape and length is in the north–south axis. It drains through its southern end into the Shawinigan River, which flows eastward and then south to empty into the Saint-Maurice River.

Major lakes feeding the Wapizagonke Lake watershed are: Reid, Houle, Jodon, Anticagamac and Avalon.

== Toponymy ==
The lake appears on the cards in 1852 under the name "Lake Pisagunk". Forestry workers identified him rather as the "lake Mistagance". Wapizagonke appear on the map in 1925 and is a variation of Ouapitagone in Montagnais, which meant according to Father Joseph-Étienne Guinard (1864-1965): "kind of very rare duck species". In Abenaki, the lake is named Wawibizagak and means "surrounded by the bush". Certain visitors named the lake under two names: "Island Lake" and "Lake Croche".

== See also ==
- Shawinigan River
- Shawinigan
