= La Mauricie National Park =

National park in Quebec, Canada

- Parc national de la Mauricie
- IUCN category II (national park)
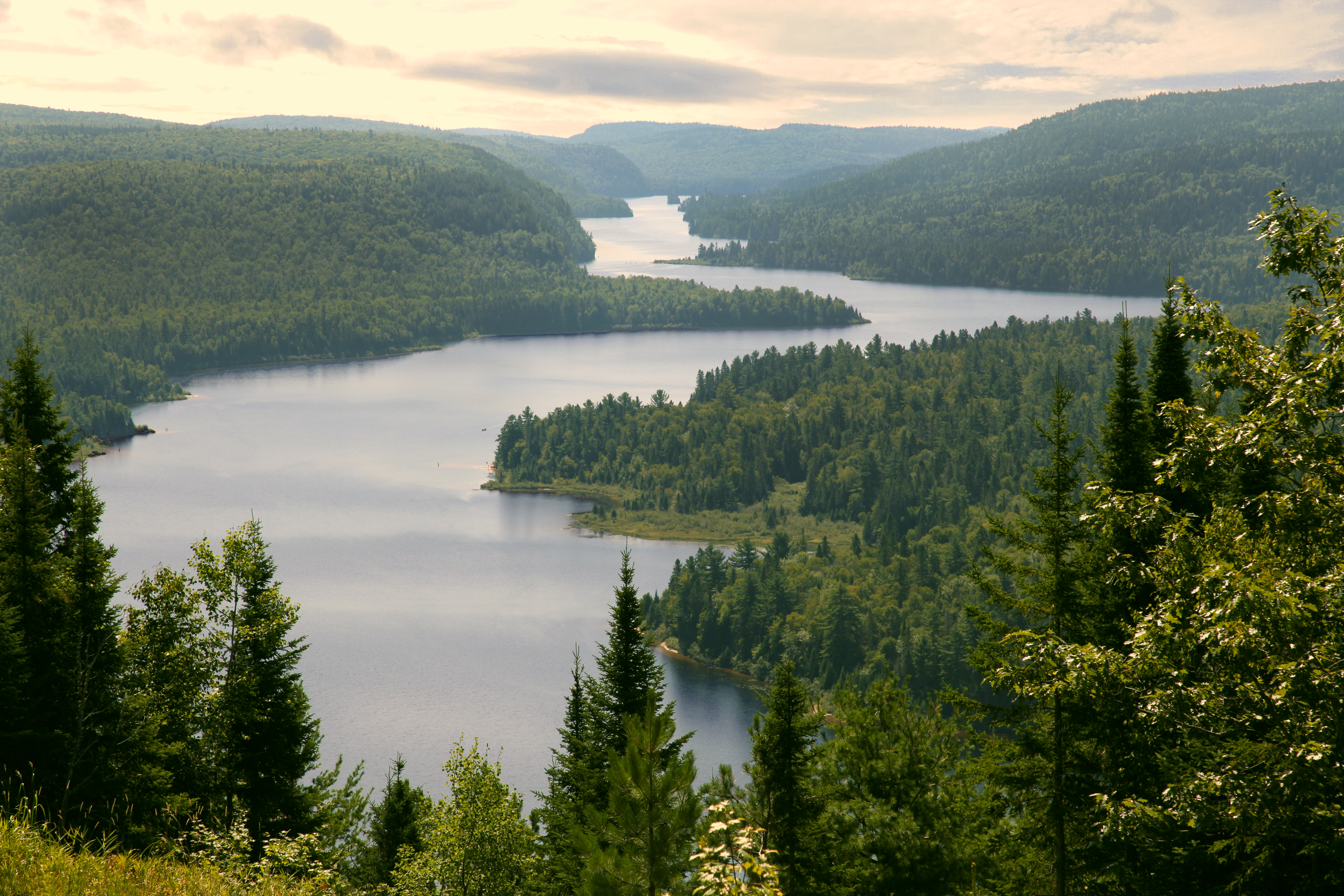
- Wapizagonke Lake viewed from the lookout "Le passage"

- Location within Canada Location within Quebec
- Interactive map of La Mauricie National Park
- Location: Saint-Mathieu-du-Parc, Quebec, Canada
- Coordinates: 46°48′N 72°58′W
- Area: 536 km^{2} (207 sq mi)
- Established: 22 August 1970
- Visitors: 278,923 (in 2022–23)
- Governing body: Parks Canada

La Mauricie National Park (French: Parc national de la Mauricie) is a national park located near Shawinigan in the Laurentian Mountains, in the Mauricie region of Quebec, Canada. It covers 536 km^{2} (207 sq mi) in the southern Canadian Shield region bordering the Saint Lawrence lowlands. The park contains 150 lakes and many ponds.

The park lies within the Eastern forest-boreal transition ecoregion. The forests in this region were logged from the middle of the 19th century to the early 20th century. The park's forests have regrown and contain a mixture of conifers and mixed deciduous trees.

Wildlife in the park includes moose, black bears, beavers and otters. It supports a small number of wood turtles, rare in Canada. The park is a popular location for camping, canoeing and kayaking.

The park is named after the nearby Saint-Maurice River to the east of the park. The Matawin River flows along the west and north borders of the park.

== Toponymy ==
The name "Mauricie" was first used in 1933 by Bishop Albert Tessier to designate an administrative region of Government of Québec, for which the Valley of Saint-Maurice is the main feature. The watershed of Saint-Maurice River is also administered in part by the administrative regions of Lanaudière (West), James Bay (North) and Saguenay-Lac-Saint-Jean (East). Moreover, the administrative region of Mauricie covers other watersheds including the Champlain River and half the territory of the Batiscanie, Quebec.

As in Saint-Maurice River, it was named in honour of the Lordship of Maurice Poulin La Fontaine. The land was a stronghold granted to his wife in 1676 near the mouth of the river. This "fief" (harvested area) was recognized in 1723 as the Saint-Maurice and the river, which previously denominated "River Three Rivers", was replaced by the current toponym for most of the 18th century. The river is also known Attikamekw under the name of Tapiskwan Sipi ("River of the threaded needle"). The Wendat people know it under the name of Oquintondili and Abenaki under the name of Madôbalodenitekw.

== Geography ==
The Mauricie National Park is located in the province of Quebec, Canada about 15 kilometres (9.3 mi) north of Shawinigan and about 45 kilometres (28 mi) north of the city of Trois-Rivières. It is bordered by the Saint-Maurice River to the east and the Matawin River to the north. It is accessible from the villages of Saint-Jean-des-Piles and Saint-Mathieu-du-Parc. Secondary access is also possible by Saint-Gérard-des-Laurentides. The park extends only three municipalities: Shawinigan, Saint-Mathieu-du-Parc and Saint-Roch-de-Mékinac.

It is bordered to the west by the Mastigouche Wildlife Reserve and north by the Zec du Chapeau-de-Paille and the Saint-Maurice Wildlife Reserve.

=== Geology ===
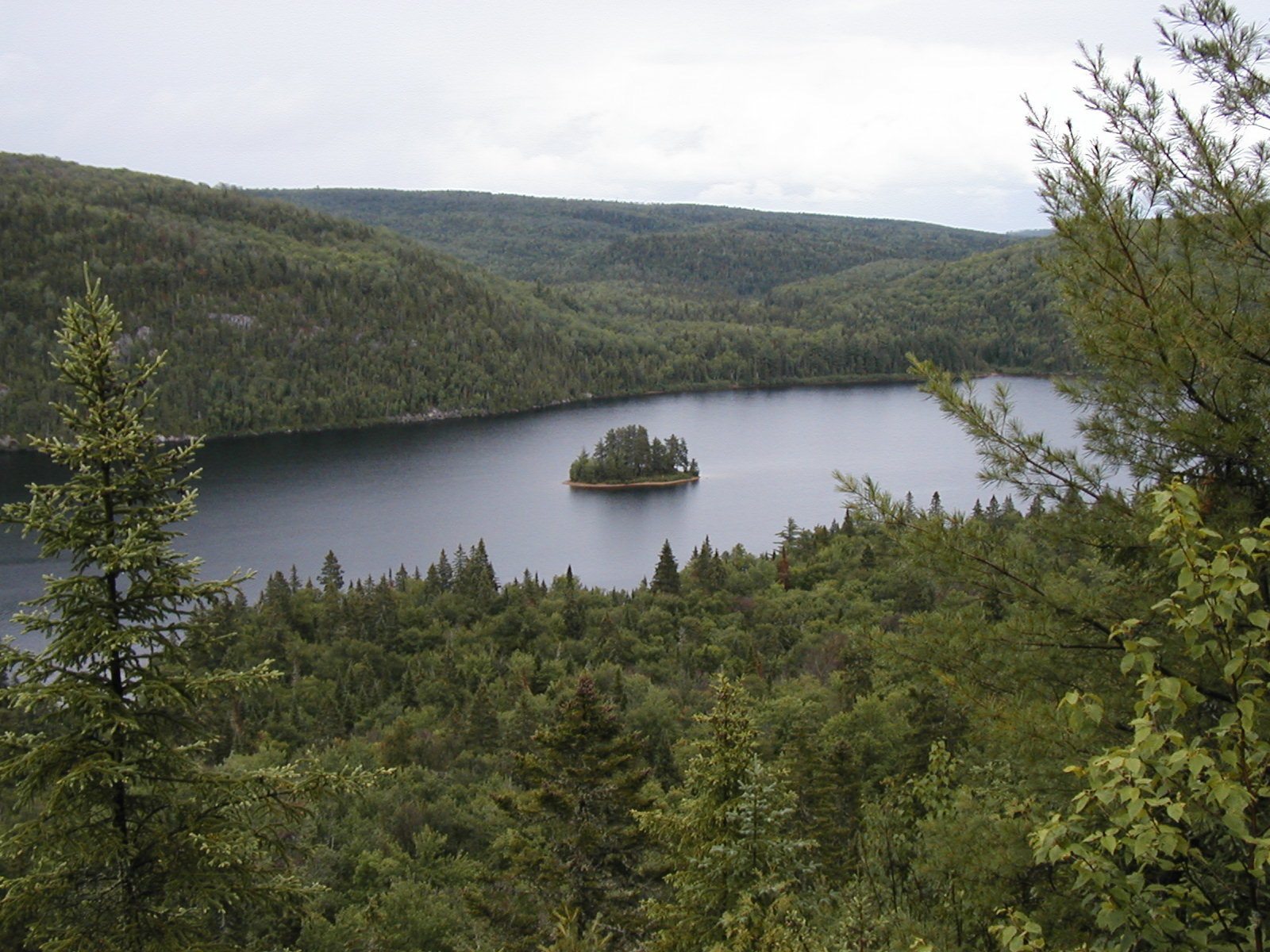
The Pines Island (Île aux pins) in the middle of Lake Wapizagonke

The park is located in Quebec, south of Canadian Shield. The park is part of the Grenville Province, the most recent of seven geological provinces that make up the entire Canadian Shield age Precambrian. The park is itself part of a plateau gently sloping east to west, from 150 metres (490 ft) near Saint-Maurice River to near 500 metres (1,600 ft) inland. This plateau of older metamorphic rocks (955 mya) is strewn with valleys and faults. The lower valleys are flooded by recent deposits dating from the retreating glaciers of the Wisconsin glaciation.

=== Hydrography ===
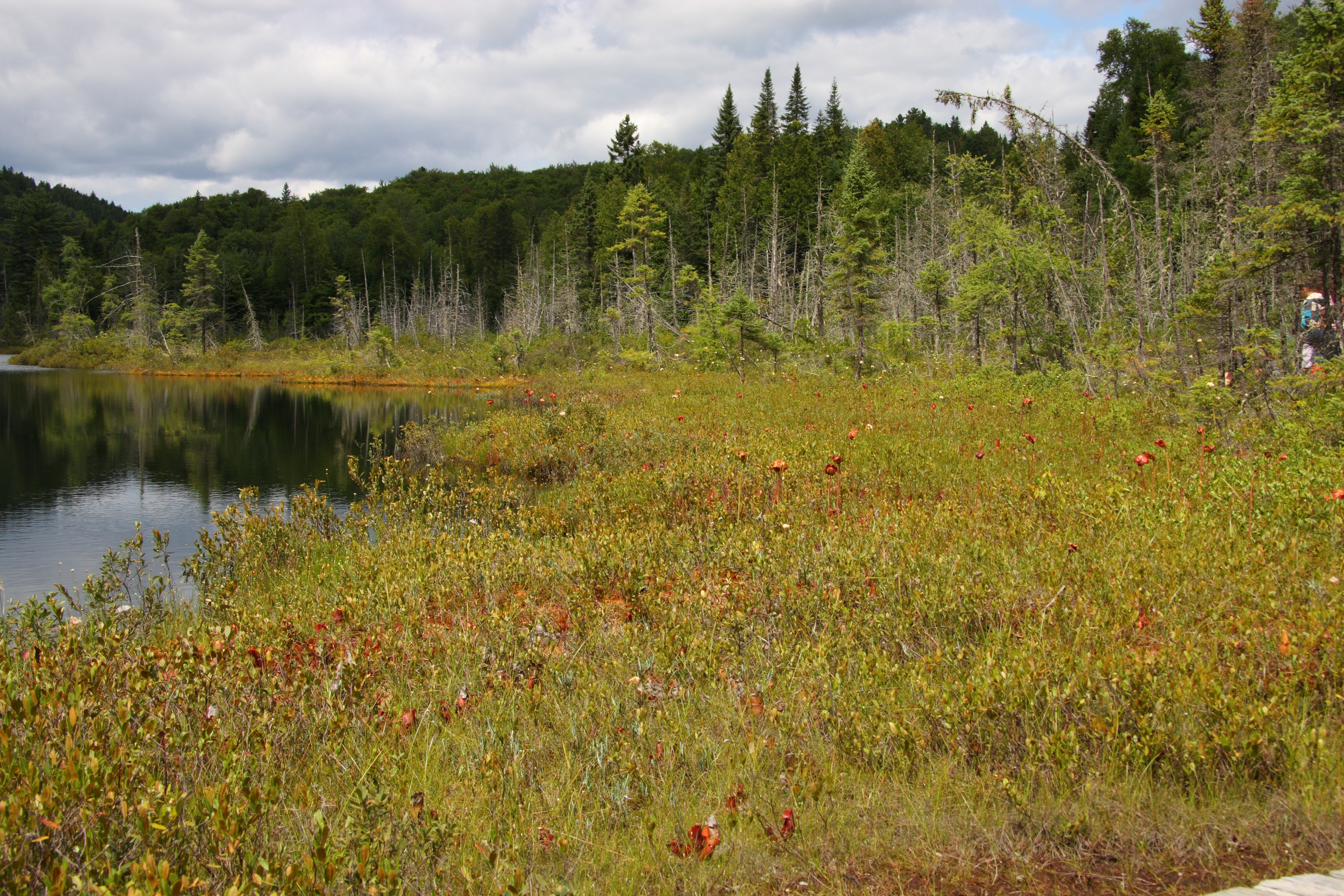
Lac de la Tourbière (Lake Bog)

There are approximately 150 lakes in the national park. Lake size varies from small bogs at higher elevations containing acidic water to the largest valley lakes that have clear water. All lakes and streams flow into the Saint-Maurice by rivers "À la pêche" River (Shawinigan), Matawin and Shawinigan.

== Natural heritage ==
The Mauricie National Park is located in the green area Level I established by Commission for Environmental Cooperation of Northern Forests. It is also entirely within the ecoregion level II of the mixed forest shield and ecological level III region of Southern Laurentians.

At the national level, the National Park is located in the ecoregion southern Laurentians, itself located in Ecoprovince Southern Boreal Shield and the Boreal Boreal Shield.

=== Flora ===
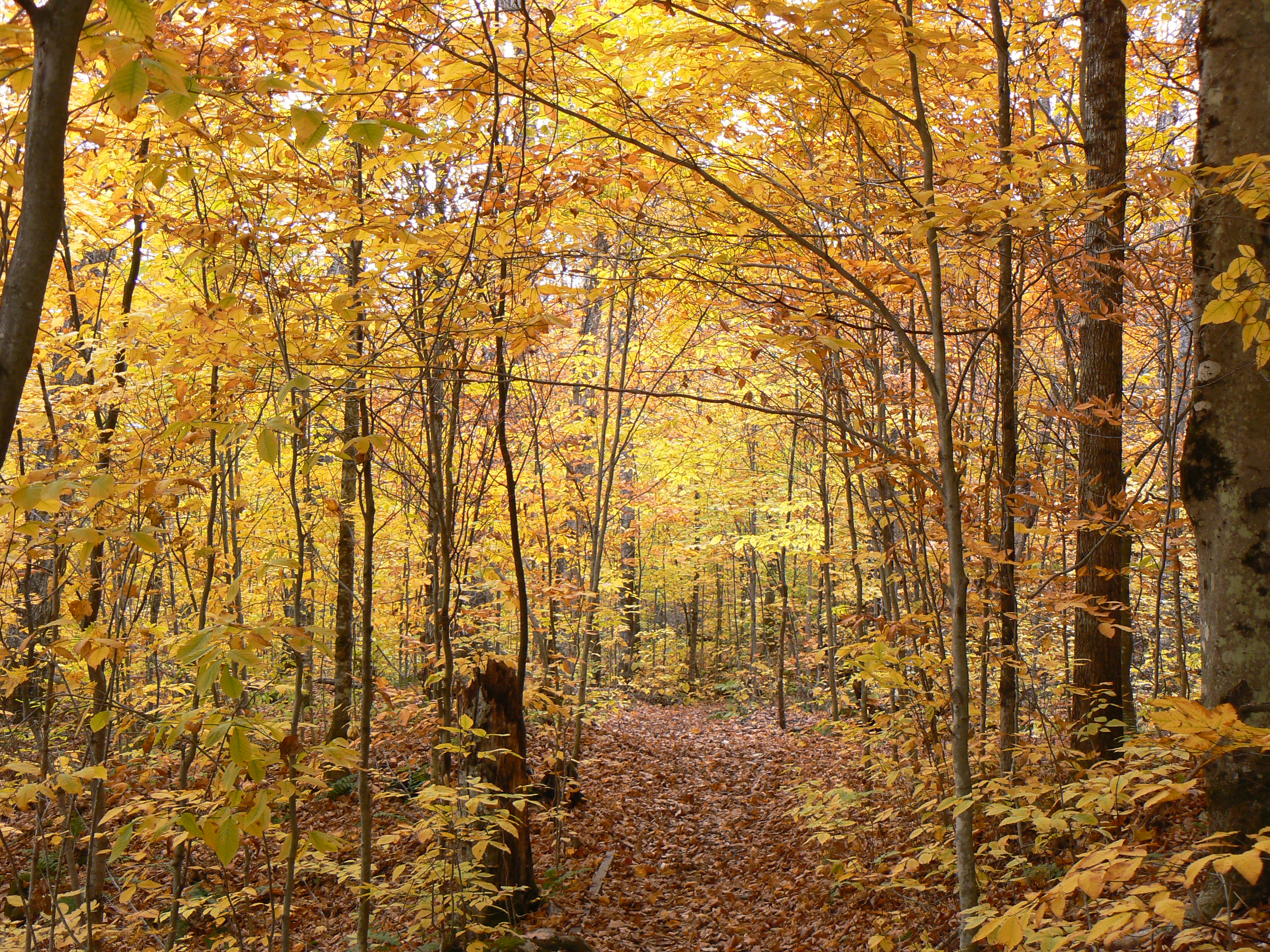
Flora fall in the path of Lake Gabet

The park contains more than 440 species of vascular plants 68 species of lichens and more than 85 species of mosses. The park also has 27 species of rare plants or special interest.

Forest covers 93% of the territory. It is located at the northern treeline leafyes Quebec. There are 30 species of different trees. The park is part of habitat ranges from maple to yellow birch (Acer saccharum and Betula papyrifera), which occupies the illuminated slopes and well-drained soils. The Balsam firs (Abies balsamea) and the pine (Pinus sp) and spruces (Picea sp) occupy the rocky cliffs and wetlands. It includes an endangered species, the butternut (Juglans cinerea).

=== Wildlife ===
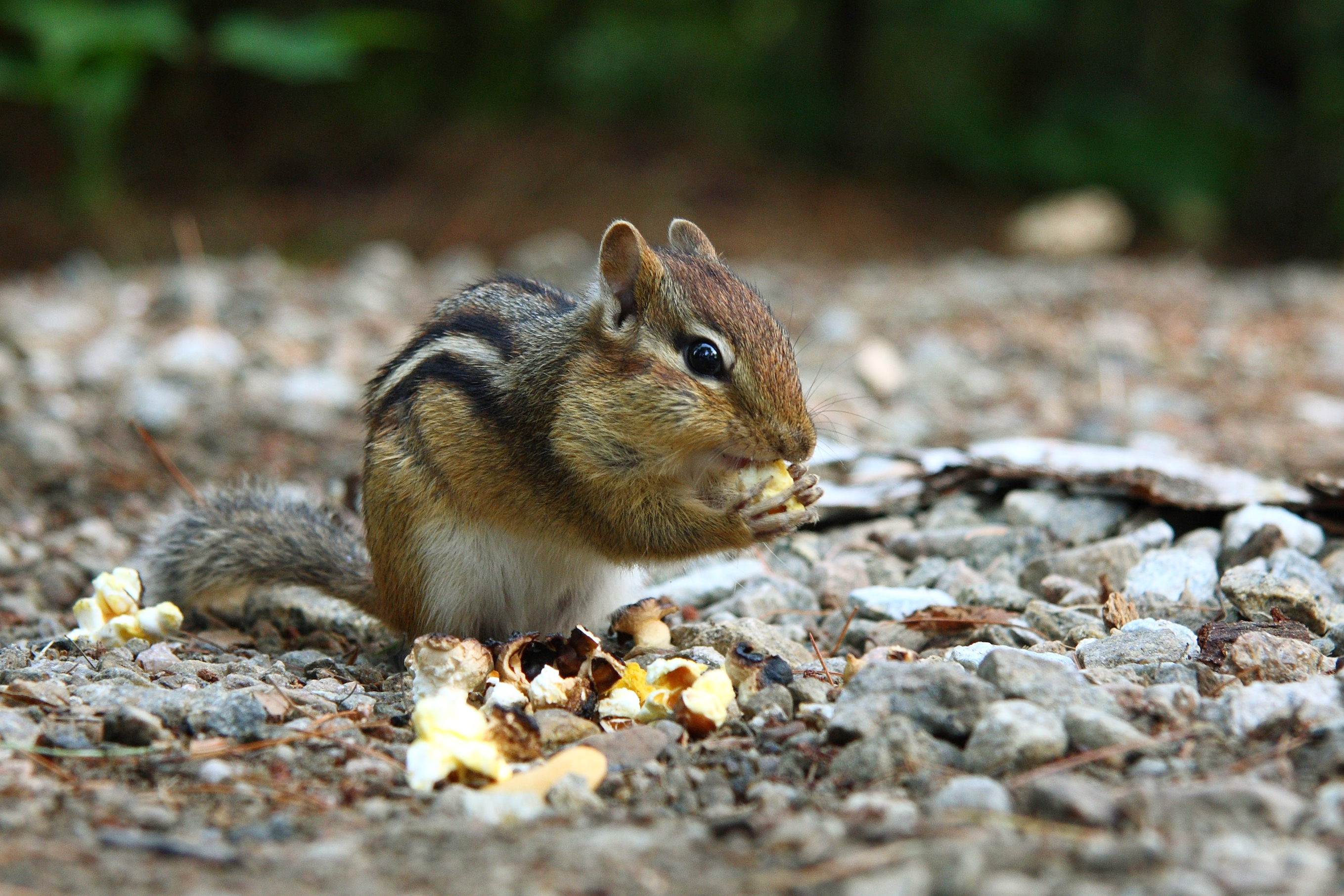
A chipmunk (Tamias striatus)

The park holds populations of dark-eyed junco (Junco hyemalis). Mixed forests are occupied by the ruffed grouse (Bonasa umbellus), the blue jay (Cyanocitta cristata), the black-capped chickadee (Poecile atricapillus) and the purple finch (Carpodacus purpureus). The ovenbird (Seiurus aurocapilla), the black-throated blue warbler (Dendroica caerulescens), the veery (Catharus fuscescens), the red-eyed vireo (Vireo olivaceus), the eastern wood pewee (Contopus virens) and the sapsucker (Sphyrapicus varius) inhabit the hardwood forests. The most common raptors observed are (Pandion haliaetus) the broad-winged hawk (Buteo platypterus), the barred owl (Strix varia) and the great horned owl (Bubo virginianus). Aquatic areas serve as nesting habitat for the common goldeneye (Bucephala clangula), the merganser (Mergus merganser), the black duck (Anas rubripes) and finally the common loon (Gavia immer), which is the emblem of the park. The park includes eight species at risk, the whip-poor-will (Caprimulgus vociferus), the nighthawk (Chordeiles minor), the chimney swift (Chaetura pelagica), the olive-sided flycatcher (Contopus cooperi), the Canada warbler (Wilsonia canadensis), the peregrine falcon (Falco peregrinus) and the rusty blackbird (Euphagus carolinus).

This park includes only five species of reptiles: the wood turtle (Glyptemys insculpta), the painted turtle (Chrysemys picta) and three species of snake, including the garter (Thamnophis sirtalis). It is also attended by fourteen species of amphibians including six salamanders and eight frogs. One species, the wood turtle, is considered endangered.

Mammals that inhabit this park include snowshoe hare (Lepus americanus), raccoon (Procyon lotor), moose (Alces alces americana), beaver (Castor canadensis), porcupine (Erethizon dorsatum), groundhog (Marmota monax), river otter (Lontra canadensis), marten (Martes americana), red fox (Vulpes vulpes), black bear (Ursus americanus), coyote (Canis latrans), lynx (Lynx canadensis), mink (Neogale vison), fisher (Pekania pennanti), and eastern wolf (Canis lycaon).

Most lakes have a relatively poor fish fauna due to the youth of the country. The brook trout (Salvelinus fontinalis) is most commonly found, especially in the north of the park. The Isaiah, the French and the Bérubé are found at lower altitudes, where lakes have the greatest biodiversity, as well as populations of stickleback (Pungitius pungitius) and spoonhead sculpin (Cottus ricei). The lakes also have the only French population of char (Salvelinus alpinus) of park. This population was threatened by the introduction at the beginning of the century of several invasive fish species, such as chub (Semotilus atromaculatus). 19 species of fish have been introduced by humans over the 19th and 20th centuries.

== History ==
The earliest human remains in the park date from the Archaic period in North America, between 7000 and 3000 BC. The 34 "protohistoric" archaeological sites suggest that Native Americans who frequented the park lived in small family groups. They mainly occupied the valley of lakes Antigamac and Wapizagonke and fished, hunted and gathered. A cliff of Lake Wapizagonke also contains cave paintings, which is one of the few witnesses to the spirituality of Native Americans in that era. Until the 17th century, the Attikamekw and Algonquian peoples respectively occupied the northern and southern basins of the Saint-Maurice River, making a living mainly by trap and hunting. The Abenaki used the park area in the middle of the 19th century for hunting and trade.

At the beginning of the 19th century logging began. It began by cutting white and red pines for lumber. This lasted until 1925, when trees of good diameter became scarce. The forest industry then turned instead to wood for paper, which made the Mauricie one of the largest paper producers newspaper for the first half of the 20th century. In addition to logging, the industry greatly altered the balance of forests by planting the white spruce 426 hectares (1,050 acres) and causing forest fires in 1910 and 1954.

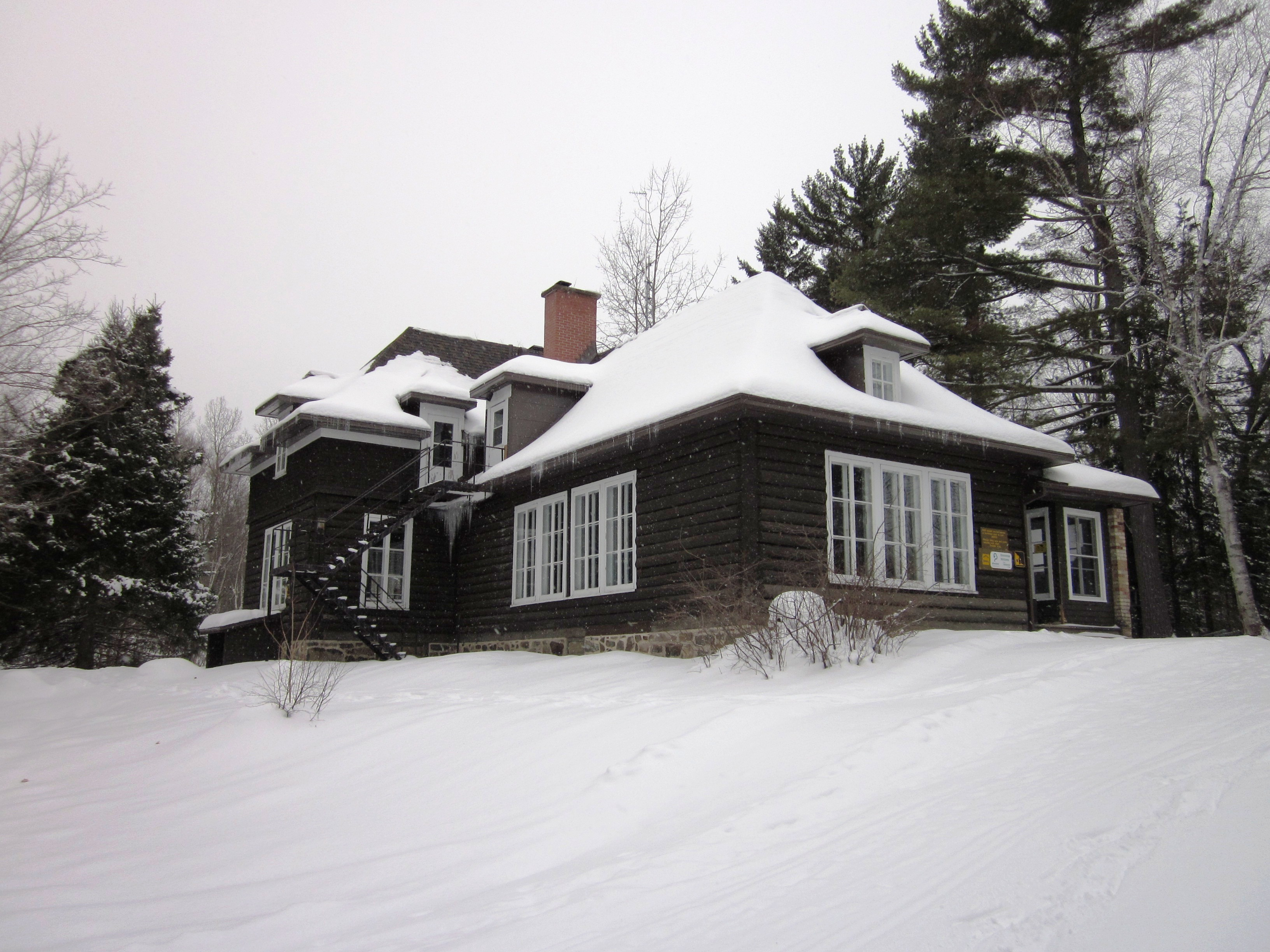
Cottage Wabenaki

At the end of the 19th century, rich American tourists settled in the area and opened private hunting and fishing clubs. The first three were the open Shawinigan Club 1883, the Laurentian Club in 1886 and the Club Commodore in 1905. Thirteen other less prestigious clubs settled on the territory of the park between 1940 and the creation of the park in 1970. Membership in the clubs was selective and members enjoyed the right to hunt and fish in the territory. Although they allowed a certain amount of nature protection in the territory of the park, these clubs introduced many exotic fish species into the lakes. Of these clubs, there remain only the "Wabenaki and Andrew lodges", old properties of the Laurentian Club located on the edge of lac à la Pêche (Lake of Fisheries). They were acquired by Parks Canada in 1972 and were converted into dormitories and rooms for visitors. A cottage at "lac des cinq" (Lake of the Five), once owned by the Brown family, is today used by the park staff.

The park was created on August 21, 1970 after a federal-provincial agreement. This creation stopped the activities of the 16 private clubs in its territory.

== Activities ==
=== Canoe camping ===
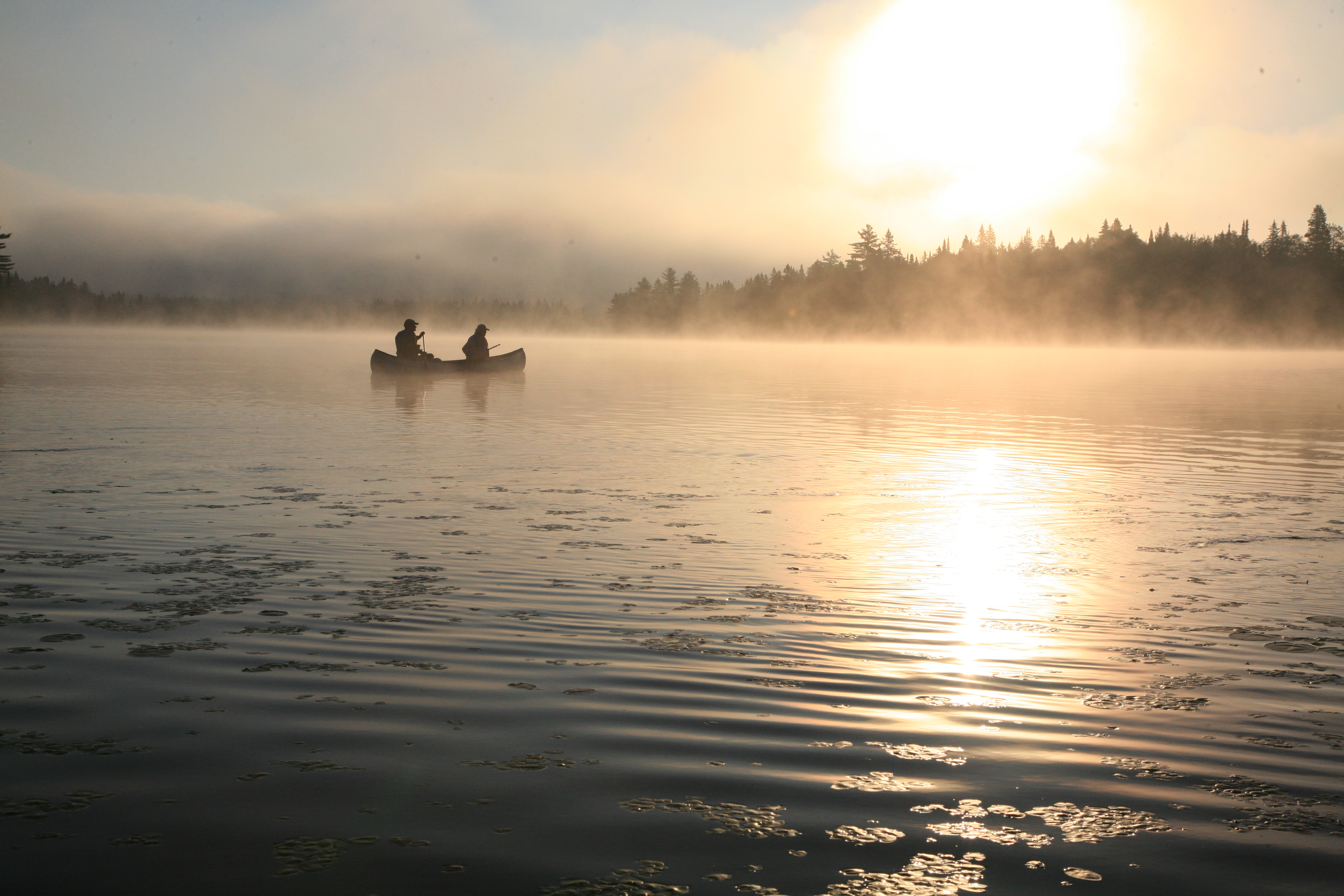
Paddling on the Lac du fou (Lake of the Crazy) at sunrise

The park offers a canoe camping circuit allowing access to a dozen lakes in the hinterland connected by many portages. This circuit allows accessing to some 200 camping sites that are accessible only by boat.

== See also ==
=== Related articles ===
- National Parks of Canada
- List of National Parks of Canada
- List of protected areas of Quebec
- Mekinac Regional County Municipality
- Matawin River (Quebec)
- Saint-Maurice River
- Shawinigan River
- Shawinigan
- Saint-Jean-des-Piles
- Saint-Mathieu-du-Parc
