= Pre-20th-century municipal history of Quebec =

Aspect of Canadian history

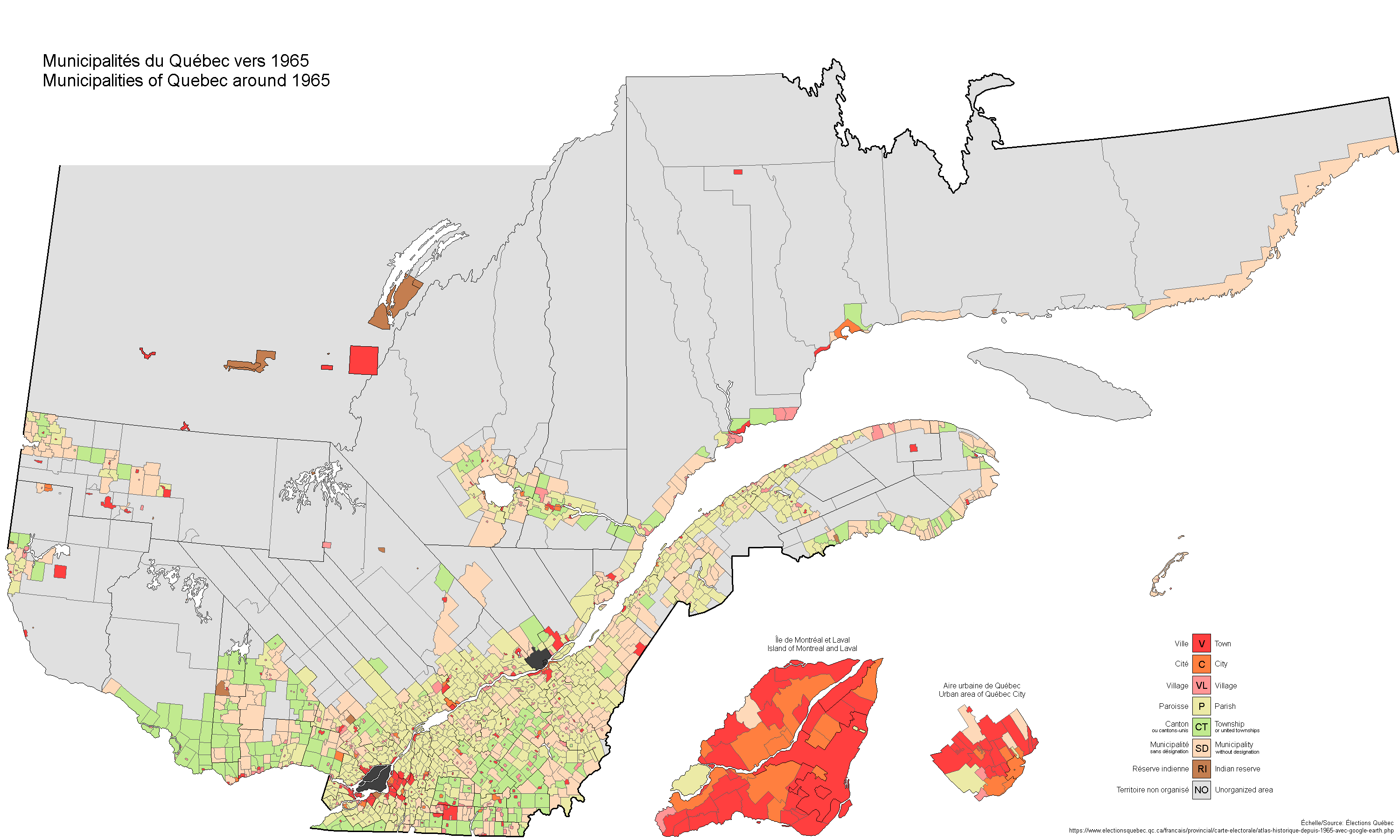
Municipalities of Quebec around 1965

The municipal history of Quebec started in 1796 with the creation of administrations for Montréal and Quebec City, but it really developed immediately prior to the creation of the Province of Canada in 1841 with the formation of municipal districts, followed in March 1845 when the Parliament of the Province of Canada adopted an Act to create local authorities in Lower Canada which took effect in July 1845.

The structure was abolished and replaced in September 1847 by a system of county municipalities, whose councillors were elected from the parishes and townships existing therein, with provision for the creation of towns and villages that would be separated from their counties. Further reform came into effect in July 1855 for all parts of Lower Canada other than Montreal, Quebec City and Saint-Hyacinthe, which included provision for the creation of local councils for parishes and townships, the representation of towns and villages on county councils, and the formation of towns and villages by order in council upon the recommendation of the relevant county council. The municipal law of Lower Canada was consolidated into a single Act in 1860.

Municipalities written in bold are on their current form.

== 1599 to 1793 ==
=== 1599 ===
- Foundation of Tadoussac

=== 1608 ===
- 3 July: Foundation of Quebec City.

=== 1634 ===
- 4 July: Foundation of Trois-Rivières.

=== 1642 ===
- 17 May: Foundation of Ville-Marie.

=== 1793 ===
- Foundation of Sherbrooke.

== 19th century ==
=== 1802 ===
- 17 May: Creation of Sherbrooke.

=== 1832 ===
- 1 January: **Montréal** and **Quebec City** became Cities.

=== 1841 ===
- 15 April: Creation of the Municipal Districts.

=== 1845 ===
- 1 July: **Creation of 167 Municipalities, 115 Parishes and 39 Townships to replace the Municipal districts. See List of Municipalities created in Quebec in 1845.**
- 13 October: Creation of the Village of Montmagny from territories taken from the Parish of Saint-Thomas.
- 3 November:
  - The Municipality of Baie-de-Gaspé is split into the Municipality of Baie-de-Gaspé-Nord and the Municipality of Baie-de-Gaspé-Sud.
  - The Municipality of Saint-François-de-Sales changed its name to Saint-François-de-Sales-Isle-Jésus.
- 11 December: The Municipality of Saint-Raymond became the Parish of Saint-Raymond-Nonnat.

=== 1846 ===
- 7 January: The Municipality of Sault-au-Récollet became the Parish of La Visitation-du-Sault-au-Récollet.
- 12 January: Creation of the Village of Philipsburg from territories taken from the Municipality of Philipsburg.
- 9 February: The Municipality of Saint-Cuthbert became a Parish.
- 25 February: The Municipality of Châteauguay became the Parish of Saint-Joachim-de-Châteauguay.
- 17 March: The Municipality of Onslow is split into the Township of Eardly and the Township of Onslow.
- 30 March: Creation of the Village of Laprairie-de-la-Magdeleine from territories taken from the Municipality of Laprairie.
- 8 April: Creation of the Village of L'Assomption from territories taken from the Municipality of L'Assomption.
- 18 May: The Municipality of Isles-de-la-Magdelaine changed its name to Isles-de-la-Magdeleine.
- 1 July:
  - The Municipality of Hochelaga is split into the Village of Côte-des-Neiges, the Village of Hochelaga, the Village of Saint-Henri, the Village of Saint-Pierre and the Village of Visitation.
  - The Municipality of Trois-Rivières is split into the Town of **Trois-Rivières** and the Suburb of Trois-Rivières.
- 4 July: Creation of the Parish of Sainte-Gertrude from territories taken from the Parish of Bécancour and the Parish of Gentilly.
- 23 July: The Municipality of Coteau-du-Lac became the Parish of Saint-Ignace-du-Coteau-du-Lac.
- 24 July: Creation of the Municipality of Sainte-Brigide from territories taken from the Parish of Sainte-Marie-de-Monnoir.
- 26 July: Creation of the Village of Beauharnois from territories taken from the Parish of Saint-Clément.
- 14 October: Creation of the Village of La Côte-Saint-Louis from territories taken from the Village of Visitation.
- 4 November: Creation of the Parish of Saint-Janvier-de-Blainville from territories taken from the Municipality of Saint-Jérôme.
- 20 November: The Municipality of Clarendon is split into the Township of Clarendon and the Township of Lichfield.
- 24 November: The Municipality of Arthabaska is split into the Municipality Saint-Christophe-d'Arthabaska and the Municipality of Saint-Norbert-d'Arthabaska.
- 25 November: Creation of the Municipality of Sainte-Marthe from territories taken from the Municipality of Rigaud.
- 23 December: Creation of the Village of Christieville from territories taken from the Parish of Saint-Athanase.

=== 1847 ===
- 6 February: Creation of the Village of Saint-Ours from territories taken from the Municipality of Saint-Ours.
- 22 April: The Municipality of Tring is split into the Municipality of Lambton and the Township of Tring.
- 7 May:
  - The Municipality of Saint-Grégoire-le-Grand-de-Monnoir became the Parish of Saint-Grégoire-le-Grand.
  - The Municipality of Sainte-Brigide became the Parish of Sainte-Brigide-de-Monnoir.
- 14 May: Creation of the Township of Calumet and the Township of Isle-des-Allumettes.
- 3 June: The Township of Stukely is split into the Municipality of North-Stukely and the Municipality of South-Stukely.
- 20 July: Creation of the Village of Aylmer from territories taken from the Township of Hull.
- 1 September: **Parishes and Townships are merged into County municipalities.**

=== 1848 ===
- 10 May: Creation of the Town of William-Henry from territories taken from the County of Richelieu.
- 8 June: Creation of the Village of Varennes from territories taken from the County of Verchères.
- 14 June: Creation of the Village of Longueuil from territories taken from the County of Chambly.
- 20 July: Creation of the Village of Saint-Jean from territories taken from the County of Chambly.
- 10 August: Creation of the Village of Saint-Eustache from territories taken from the County of Lac-des-Deux-Montagnes.
- 24 August: Creation of the Village of Lachine from territories taken from the County of Montreal.
- 9 October: Creation of the Village of Huntingdon from territories taken from the County of Beauharnois.
- 26 October: Creation of the Village of Chambly from territories taken from the County of Chambly.

=== 1849 ===
- 30 May: Creation of the Municipality of Sainte-Anne-des-Monts from territories taken from the County of Gaspé.
- 1 June: Creation of the Village of Saint-Thérèse-de-Blainville from territories taken from the County of Terrebonne.
- 6 October: Creation of the Village of Saint-Hyacinthe from territories taken from the County of Saint-Hyacinthe.

=== 1850 ===
- 12 April: Creation of the Village of Saint-Michel-de-Vaudreuil from territories taken from the County of Vaudreuil.
- 26 June: Creation of the Village of Fraserville from territories taken from the County of Rimouski.
- 10 August: The Village of **Saint-Hyacinthe** became a Town.

=== 1852 ===
- 14 April: Creation of the Village of Berthier from territories taken from the County of Berthier.
- 28 June: Creation of the Town of **Sherbrooke** from territories taken from the County of Sherbrooke.
- 19 July: Creation of the Parish of Saint-Jérusalem-d’Argenteuil from territories taken from the County of Lac-des-Deux-Montagnes.
- 1 December: Creation of the Village of Soulanges from territories taken from the County of Vaudreuil.

=== 1853 ===
- 9 November: Creation of the Village of Coteau-Landing from territories taken from the County of Vaudreuil.
- 22 December: Creation of the Village of Terrebonne from territories taken from the County of Terrebonne.

=== 1854 ===
- 24 August: Creation of the Village of Saint-Joachim-de-la-Pointe-Claire from territories taken from the County of Montreal.

=== 1855 ===
- 13 February: Creation of the Village of Buckingham from territories taken from the County of Ottawa.
- 21 February: Creation of the Village of Napierville from territories taken from the County of Huntingdon.
- 19 April: Creation of the Village of Bassin-de-Chambly from territories taken from the County of Chambly.
- 27 April: Creation of the Village of Plessisville from territories taken from the County of Mégantic.
- 18 May: Creation of the Village of Sainte-Scholastique from territories taken from the County of Lac-des-Deux-Montagnes.
- 1 July: **Creation of 286 Parishes and 113 Townships from county municipalities. See List of municipalities created in Quebec in 1855.**
- 6 August: Creation of the Parish of Saint-Sauveur from territories taken from the Municipality of Saint-Jérôme and the Township of Abercrombie.
- 13 September: Creation of the Parish of Saint-Raphaël from territories taken from the Parish of Saint-Michel and the Parish of Saint-Vallier.
- 19 September: Creation of the Parish of Saint-Fidèle-de-Mont-Murray from territories taken from the Parish of Saint-Étienne-de-Murray-Bay.
- 1 December: The Municipality of Metschermet changed its name to Linière.

=== 1856 ===
- 1 January: Creation of the Township of Chertsey.
- 8 February: Creation of the Parish of Saint-Colomb-de-Sillery from territories taken from the Parish of Québec and the Parish of Saint-Foye.
- 9 June: Creation of the Parish of Saint-Joseph from territories taken from the Municipality of Saint-Benoît and the Municipality of Saint-Eustache.
- 19 June: The Township of Stoke is annexed by the Township of Windsor.
- 1 July: Creation of the Village of Saint-Jérôme from territories taken from the Municipality of Saint-Jérôme.
- 19 July: Creation of the Parish of Notre-Dame-du-Portage from territories taken from the Municipality of Rivière-du-Loup and the Parish of Saint-André.
- 28 August:
  - Creation of the Parish of Saint-Frédéric-de-Beauce from territories taken from the Parish of Saint-Joseph-de-la-Beauce.
  - Creation of the Parish of Saint-Liboire from territories taken from the Municipality of Saint-Simon and the Parish of Saint-Dominique.
- 15 September: The Village of Saint-Jean became a Town.
- 11 December:
  - The Municipality of Aubert-Gallion became the Parish of Saint-Georges.
  - Creation of the Parish of Saint-Antonin from territories taken from the Municipality of Rivière-du-Loup.
  - The Township of Whitworth became the Parish of Saint-Modeste.

=== 1857 ===
- 1 January:
  - Creation of the Municipality of Lac-Saint-Jean.
  - Creation of the Village of Boucherville from territories taken from the Parish of Boucherville.
  - The Village of Napierville is annexed by the Parish of Saint-Cyprien.
  - Creation of the Village of Princeville from territories taken from the Township of Stanfold.
  - Creation of the Village of Saint-Lin from territories taken from the Parish of Saint-Lin-de-Lachenaye.
  - Creation of the Village of Stanstead Plain from territories taken from the Township of **Stanstead**.
- 15 January:
  - The Municipality of Saint-Jacques-le-Mineur became a Parish.
  - Creation of the Parish of Sainte-Agathe from territories taken from the Parish of Saint-Gilles.
- 20 February: Creation of the Parish of Saint-Paul-l’Ermite from territories taken from the Parish of Repentigny.
- 12 March: The Municipality of Sainte-Marthe became a Parish.
- 9 June: Creation of the Parish of Saint-Canut from territories taken from the Municipality of Saint-Colomban and the Municipality of Sainte-Scholastique.
- 10 June:
  - The Town of **Saint-Hyacinthe** became a City.
  - Creation of the Village of Saint-Césaire from territories taken from the Municipality of Saint-Césaire.
- 1 July:
  - The Town of **Trois-Rivières** became a City.
  - Creation of the Municipality of **Saint-Aubert** from territories taken from the Municipality of Port-Joli.
  - Creation of the Municipality of Saint-Lambert from territories taken from the Parish of Longueuil.
  - Creation of the Township of Franklin from territories taken from the Municipality of Russeltown, the Township of **Hemmingford** and the Township of Hinchinbrooke.
- 17 October: Creation of the Parish of Saint-Robert from territories taken from the Municipality of Sorel, the Parish of Saint-Aimé and the Parish of Sainte-Victoire.

=== 1858 ===
- 1 January:
  - The Municipality of Grantham is split into the Municipality of Grantham-Wendover-et-Simpson and the Parish of Saint-Germain.
  - Creation of the Municipality of Low from territories taken from the Township of Wakefield.
  - The Municipality of Sainte-Julie-de-Somerset became the Township of Somerset-Nord.
  - Creation of the Village of Kamouraska from territories taken from the Parish of Kamouraska.
  - Creation of the Village of Sainte-Rose from territories taken from the Parish of Sainte-Rose-de-Lima.
  - The Parish of Saint-Calixte-de-Somerset became the Township of Somerset-Sud.
  - The Township of Halifax is split into the Township of Halifax-Nord and the Township of Halifax-Sud.
  - The Township of Ireland became the Municipality of Ireland-et-Coleraine.
  - The Township of Winslow is split into the Municipality of Winslow-Nord and the Municipality of Winslow-Sud.
- 1 March: The Township of Horton is annexed by the Township of Bulstrode.
- 31 May: The Municipality of Saint-Bazile became the Parish of Saint-Basile.
- 5 August: The Municipality of Russeltown became the Parish of Saint-Jean-Chrysostome.
- 16 August:
  - Creation of the Village of Arthabaskaville from territories taken from the Parish of **Saint-Christophe-d’Arthabaska**.
  - Creation of the Village of Fermont from territories taken from the Parish of **Saint-Maurice**.
  - Creation of the Village of Marieville from territories taken from the Parish of Sainte-Marie-de-Monnoir.
  - Creation of the Township of **Westbury** from territories taken from the Township of Ascot.
- 21 August: The Municipality of Ormstown became the Parish of Saint-Malachie-d’Ormstown.

=== 1859 ===
- 1 January:
  - Creation of the Village of Granby from territories taken from the Township of Granby.
  - Creation of the Township of Chester-Est from territories taken from the Parish of Saint-Norbert-d’Arthabaska.
  - Creation of the Township of Chester-Ouest from territories taken from the Parish of Saint-Norbert-d’Arthabaska and the Township of Tingwick.
  - Creation of the Township of MacNider from territories taken from the Municipality of Métis.
  - Creation of the Township of Saint-Jean.
  - Creation of the Township of Waltham.
- 8 March: Creation of the Parish of Saint-Justin from territories taken from the Municipality of Maskinongé.
- 16 March: Creation of the Parish of **Notre-Dame-du-Mont-Carmel** from territories taken from the Parish of Cap-de-la-Magdeleine and the Parish of **Saint-Maurice**.
- 14 April: Creation of the Parish of Saint-Étienne from territories taken from the Parish of Trois-Rivières.
- 3 May: The Municipality of Bienheureux-Alphonse-de-Rodriguez became the Parish of Bienheureux-Alphonse-Rodriguez.
- 4 May:
  - The Municipality of Bagot is split into the Municipality of Bagotville-Partie-Nord-Ouest-du-Township-de-Bagot and the Municipality of Grande-Baie.
  - The Municipality of Lac-Saint-Jean is split into the Municipality of **Hébertville** and the Municipality of Roberval.
  - The Village of Christieville became the Town of Iberville.
- 8 May: Creation of the Parish of **Saint-Anaclet-de-Lessard** from territories taken from the Parish of Saint-Germain-de-Rimouski and the Parish of Sainte-Luce.
- 13 May: Creation of the Parish of Saint-Onésime-d’Ixworth from territories taken from the Municipality of Sainte-Anne-de-la-Pocatière.
- 4 June: Creation of the Parish of Saint-Roch-de-Richelieu from territories taken from the Municipality of Saint-Ours.
- 19 August:
  - The Municipality of Saint-Jean-Baptiste became the Parish of Saint-Jean-Baptiste-de-Rouville.
  - Creation of the Parish of Sainte-Angélique from territories taken from the Municipality of La Petite-Nation.
- 23 October: Creation of the Village of Saint-Rémi from territories taken from the Parish of Saint-Rémi.

=== 1860 ===
- 1 January:
  - The Municipality of **Low** became a Township.
  - Creation of the Village of Danville from territories taken from the Township of Shipton.
  - Creation of the Village of Melbourne from territories taken from the Township of **Melbourne**.
  - Creation of the Village of Sainte-Geneviève from territories taken from the Parish of Sainte-Geneviève.
  - The Parish of Isle-aux-Grues changed its name to **Saint-Antoine-de-l'Isle-aux-Grues**.
  - Creation of the Township of Buckland.
  - Creation of the Township of **Saint-Camille** from territories taken from the Township of Wotton.
  - Creation of the Township of Wexford.
  - Creation of the United Townships of Garthby-et-Stratford from territories taken from the Municipality of Dudswell.
- 11 February: The Municipality of Saint-Simon became a Parish.
- 19 March: Creation of the Parish of Saint-Alban-d’Alton from territories taken from the Municipality of Deschambault.
- 19 May:
  - The Town of William-Henry changed its name to Sorel.
  - The Village of **Terrebonne** became a Town.
- 8 June: Creation of the Parish of Saint-Antoine-Abbé from territories taken from the Township of Franklin.
- 24 September: Creation of the Parish of Saint-Étienne-de-Lauzon from territories taken from the Parish of Saint-Bernard and the Parish of Saint-Nicolas.
- 29 November: The Municipality of Lacolle became the Parish of Saint-Bernard-de-Lacolle.
- 11 December:
  - The Municipality of Métis became the Parish of Saint-Octave-de-Métis.
  - Creation of the Parish of **Sainte-Louise** from territories taken from the Municipality of Saint-Roch-des-Aulnets.
- 31 December: Creation of the Municipality of Saint-Hubert from territories taken from the Parish of Longueuil.

=== 1861 ===
- 1 January:
  - The Municipality of Buckingham is split into the Township of Buckingham and the Township of Portland.
  - Creation of the Municipality of Notre-Dame-des-Anges-de-Stanbridge from territories taken from the Parish of Saint-Georges.
  - Creation of the Village of Acton Vale from territories taken from the Township of Acton.
  - Creation of the Township of Armagh from territories taken from the Parish of Saint-François-de-Sales-de-la-Rivière-du-Sud.
  - Creation of the Township of Hunterstown from territories taken from the Parish of Saint-Paulin.
  - Creation of the Township of Ripon.
  - The Township of Windsor is split into the Municipality of Saint-Georges-de-Windsor and the Municipality of Windsor-et-Stoke.
- 18 May:
  - Creation of the Town of Lévis from territories taken from the Parish of Notre-Dame-de-la-Victoire.
  - The Municipality of L'Assomption became a Parish.
  - The Municipality of Lachenaie became the Parish of Saint-Charles-de-Lachenaie.
  - The Municipality of Saint-Césaire became a Parish.
  - The Municipality of **Saint-Sulpice** became a Parish.
  - The Municipality of Sorel became a Parish.
  - Creation of the Municipality of Whitton from territories taken from the Municipality of **Bury**.
  - The Municipality of Yamaska became the Parish of Saint-Michel-d’Yamaska.
  - Creation of the Village of Saint-Jean-Baptiste from territories taken from the Village of La Côte-Saint-Louis.
  - Creation of the Village of Victoriaville from territories taken from the Parish of **Saint-Christophe-d’Arthabaska**.
  - Creation of the Parish of Saint-Hyacinthe-le-Confesseur from territories taken from the Parish of Saint-Hyacinthe.
  - Creation of the Parish of **Saint-Sévère** from territories taken from the Municipality of Yamachiche.
- 6 July: The Municipality of Viger became a Township.
- 13 August: Creation of the Township of Denonville from territories taken from the Municipality of Isle-Verte.

=== 1862 ===
- 1 January:
  - The Municipality of Blandford became the Parish of Saint-Louis-de-Blandford.
  - Creation of the Municipality of Chemins-Elgin-et-Taché.
  - The Municipality of Valcartier is split into the Municipality of **Saint-Gabriel-de-Valcartier** and the Municipality of Saint-Gabriel-Ouest.
  - Creation of the Village of Farnham-Ouest from territories taken from the Township of Farnham-Ouest.
  - Creation of the Village of Portage-du-Fort from territories taken from the Township of Litchfield.
  - Creation of the Township of Aylwin.
  - The Township of Bulstrode became the Parish of Saint-Valère-de-Bulstrode.
  - Creation of the Township of Montminy.
- 9 June: Creation of the Municipality of Saint-Roch-de-Québec-Nord from territories taken from the Parish of Saint-Roch.
- 1 July: Creation of the Municipality of **L'Avenir** from territories taken from the Municipality of Durham and the Township of Wickham.

=== 1863 ===
- 1 January:
  - Creation of the Village of Bienville from territories taken from the Parish of Notre-Dame-de-la-Victoire.
  - Creation of the Village of Côte-des-Neiges and the Village of Hochelaga from territories taken from the Parish of Montreal.
  - Creation of the Village of La Rochelle from territories taken from the Parish of Saint-Grégoire-le-Grand.
  - Creation of the Village of Richmond from territories taken from the Township of **Cleveland**.
  - Creation of the Village of **Roxton Falls** from territories taken from the Township of **Roxton**.
  - Creation of the Parish of **Saint-Édouard-de-Lotbinière** from territories taken from the Municipality of Lotbinière.
  - Creation of the Parish of Sainte-Agathe from territories taken from the Parish of Sainte-Adèle.
  - Creation of the Parish of Sainte-Emmélie-de-Lotbinière from territories taken from the Municipality of Lotbinière and the Parish of Saint-Jean-Deschaillons.
  - Creation of the Township of Shenley from territories taken from the Municipality of Linière.
- 17 January:
  - The Municipality of Saint-Hubert became a Parish.
  - Creation of the Parish of Sainte-Flore from territories taken from the Parish of Cap-de-la-Magdeleine.
- 18 February: Creation of the Parish of Notre-Dame-de-Portneuf from territories taken from the Municipality of Cap-Santé and the Municipality of Deschambault.
- 12 March: Creation of the Village of Chicoutimi from territories taken from the Municipality of Chicoutimi.
- 1 April: Creation of the Township of **Havelock** from territories taken from the Township of **Hemmingford**.
- 5 May:
  - Creation of the Municipality of Escoumains.
  - Creation of the Municipality of Tadoussac.
- 11 July: Creation of the Parish of Saint-Tite from territories taken from the Parish of Saint-Stanislas-de-la-Rivière-des-Envies and the Parish of Sainte-Anne-de-la-Pérade.
- 20 July: The Municipality of Abbotsford became the Parish of Saint-Paul.
- 27 August: Creation of the Parish of **Saint-Didace** from territories taken from the Parish of Saint-Gabriel-de-Brandon.
- 15 October: The Village of **Beauharnois** became a Town.

=== 1864 ===
- 1 January:
  - Creation of the Town of **Joliette** from territories taken from the Parish of Saint-Charles-Borrommée-du-Village-d’Industrie.
  - The Municipality of Grantham-Wendover-et-Simpson is split into the Township of Grantham and the United Townships of Wendover-et-Simpson.
  - The Municipality of Warwick is split into the Parish of Saint-Albert-de-Warwick and the Township of Warwick.
  - The Municipality of Windsor-et-Stoke is split into the Township of Stoke and the Township of Windsor.
  - Creation of the Village of Coaticook from territories taken from the Township of Barnston.
  - Creation of the Village of New-Glasgow from territories taken from the Municipality of Lacorne.
  - Creation of the Parish of Sainte-Clothilde-de-Horton.
  - The Township of Acton is split into the Parish of Saint-André-d'Acton and the Parish of Saint-Théodore-d'Acton.
  - Creation of the Township of Ely-Nord from territories taken from the Township of Ely.
  - Creation of the Township of Saint-Valérien-de-Milton from territories taken from the Township of **Roxton** and the dissolved Township of Milton.
  - Creation of the Township of Sainte-Cécile-de-Milton from territories taken from the Township of Granby, the Township of **Roxton** and the dissolved Township of Milton.
    - The Township of Milton is therefore dissolved and its territory is split between the newly formed Township of Saint-Valérien-de-Milton and the newly formed Township of Sainte-Cécile-de-Milton.
  - The Township of Tingwick is split into the Municipality of Chénier and the Municipality of Tingwick.
  - The Township of Tring is split into the Municipality of Saint-Éphrem-de-Tring and the Municipality of Saint-Victor-de-Tring.
  - Creation of the Township of Wright.
  - The United Townships of Ham is split into the Township of Ham-Nord and the Township of Ham-Sud.
- 11 May: Creation of the Parish of Sainte-Béatrix from territories taken from the Municipality of Sainte-Mélanie.
- 30 June:
  - Creation of the Municipality of Sainte-Brigitte from territories taken from the Parish of **Saint-Zéphirin-de-Courval**.
  - Creation of the Parish of Sainte-Marguerite-du-Lac-Masson from territories taken from the Township of Wexford.
- 1 July:
  - The Municipality of Aston is split into the Municipality of Saint-Léonard, the Municipality of **Saint-Wenceslas**, the Municipality of **Sainte-Eulalie** and a section of the Municipality of **Saint-Célestin**.
  - Creation of the Municipality of **Saint-Célestin** from territories taken from the Parish of Saint-Grégoire-le-Grand and a section of the dissolved Municipality of Aston.
- 1 August: Creation of the Parish of Saint-Malachy from territories taken from the Township of **Lochaber**.

=== 1865 ===
- 1 January:
  - Creation of the Municipality of Chutes-de-Kingsey from territories taken from the Municipality of Kingsey and the Township of Warwick.
  - Creation of the Municipality of **Durham-Sud** from territories taken from the Municipality of Durham and the Parish of Saint-André-d'Acton.
  - Creation of the Township of Bégon from territories taken from the Municipality of Trois-Pistoles.
  - Creation of the United Townships of Hartwell-et-Suffolk.
- 19 January: Creation of the Parish of Saint-Luc from territories taken from the Parish of Champlain.
- 17 February: Creation of the Parish of Saint-Sébastien from territories taken from the Parish of Saint-Georges.
- 15 March: Creation of the Parish of Sainte-Angèle from territories taken from the Parish of Sainte-Marie-de-Monnoir.
- 18 August: Creation of the Parish of Saint-Mathieu-de-Rioux from territories taken from the Municipality of Saint-Simon-de-la-Baie-Ha! Ha!.
- 18 September: The Village of Berthier became a Town.

=== 1866 ===
- 1 January:
  - Creation of the Municipality of Grand-Méchin from territories taken from the Municipality of Matane.
  - Creation of the United Townships of Alleyn-Cawood-et-Thorne.
- 20 February: Creation of the Parish of Saint-Pacôme from territories taken from the Municipality of **Rivière-Ouelle**.
- 14 June: Creation of the Parish of **Saint-Pie-de-Guire** from territories taken from territories taken from the Parish of Saint-David.
- 12 July: Creation of the Township of Leslie.
- 15 August:
  - Creation of the Municipality of York from territories taken from the Municipality of Baie-de-Gaspé-Sud.
  - The Village of **Saint-Ours** became a Town.

=== 1867 ===
- 1 January:
  - The Municipality of Upton is split into the Parish of Saint-Bonaventure and the Parish of Saint-Guillaume.
  - Creation of the Municipality of Saint-Étienne-de-Beauharnois from territories taken from the Parish of Saint-Clément and the Parish of **Saint-Louis-de-Gonzague**.
  - Creation of the Municipality of Wickham-Ouest from territories taken from the Township of Wickham.
  - Creation of the Village of Dunham from territories taken from the Township of Dunham.
  - Creation of the Village of Frelighsburg from territories taken from the Parish of Saint-Armand-Est.
  - Creation of the Village of Lauzon from territories taken from the Parish of Pointe-Lévi.
  - Creation of the Village of Saint-Michel from territories taken from the Parish of Saint-Michel-d’Yamaska.
  - Creation of the Village of Warwick from territories taken from the Township of Warwick.
  - Creation of the Village of Waterloo from territories taken from the Township of **Shefford**.
  - Creation of the Township of Cameron and the Township of Northfield.
  - Creation of the Township of Mailloux from territories taken from the Township of Buckland.
- 8 May: Creation of the Parish of Saint-Agapit-de-Beaurivage from territories taken from the Parish of Saint-Apollinaire and the Parish of Saint-Gilles.
- 1 July: Creation of the Township of Bouchette.

=== 1868 ===
- 13 January: Creation of the Parish of Sainte-Jeanne-de-Neuville from territories taken from the Municipality of Cap-Santé, the Municipality of Pointe-aux-Trembles, the Parish of Saint-Basile and the Parish of Sainte-Catherine.
- 24 February:
  - The Municipality of Saint-Cyrille became the Parish of **Saint-Cyrille-de-Lessard**.
  - The Township of Percé is split into the Municipality of Anse-du-Cap and the Municipality of Percé.

=== 1869 ===
- 1 January:
  - Creation of the Village of Richelieu from territories taken from the Parish of Saint-Mathias.
  - Creation of the Village of Saint-Georges-de-Kakouna from territories taken from the Municipality of Kakonna.
  - Creation of the Parish of Saint-Eugène-de-l'Islet from territories taken from the Municipality of Islet.
- 15 February: Creation of the Parish of Notre-Dame-de-Bon-Secours from territories taken from the Parish of Saint-Mathias and the Parish of Sainte-Marie-de-Monnoir.
- 10 March: Creation of the Parish of **Saint-Donat** from territories taken from the Parish of Sainte-Luce.
- 16 March: The Municipality of Mont-Carmel became the Parish of Notre-Dame-du-Mont-Carmel.
- 18 March: Creation of the Parish of Sainte-Angèle-de-Mérici from territories taken from the Parish of Saint-Octave-de-Métis and the Parish of **Sainte-Flavie**.
- 5 April: Creation of the Town of Saint-Germain-de-Rimouski from territories taken from the Parish of Saint-Germain-de-Rimouski.
- 1 June: Creation of the Parish of Saint-Ulric from territories taken from the Municipality of Matane.
- 23 July: Creation of the Parish of Saint-Siméon from territories taken from the Parish of Saint-Étienne-de-Murray-Bay.
- 9 August: Creation of the Parish of Sainte-Dorothée from territories taken from the Parish of Saint-Martin and the Parish of Sainte-Rose-de-Lima.
- 26 October: The Municipality of Saint-Étienne-de-Beauharnois became the Parish of Saint-Étienne.

=== 1870 ===
- 1 January:
  - Creation of the Village of Canrobert from territories taken from the Parish of Saint-Ange-Gardien.
  - Creation of the Township of Langevin.
  - Creation of the United Townships of Mulgrave-et-Derry.
  - The United Townships of Newport-Ditton-Chesham-Clinton-et-Aukland are split into the Township of Auckland and the United Townships of Newport-Ditton-Chesham-et-Clinton.
- 1 February: The Township of Cap-Rosier is split into the Municipality of Anse-aux-Griffons and the Municipality of Cap-des-Rosiers.
- 1 March: The Township of Forsyth became the Municipality of Saint-Évariste-de-Forsyth.
- 25 June: Creation of the Parish of Sainte-Félicité from territories taken from the Municipality of Matane.
- 8 September: Creation of the Parish of Sainte-Angèle-de-Laval from territories taken from the Parish of Bécancour and the Parish of Saint-Grégoire-le-Grand.
- 24 December:
  - Creation of the Municipality of Chester-Nord from territories taken from the Township of Chester-Est.
  - The Parish of Sorel changed its name to Saint-Pierre-de-Sorel.

=== 1871 ===
- 1 January:
  - Creation of the Village of La Côte-la-Visitation from territories taken from the Parish of Montreal.
  - Creation of the Village of Lennoxville from territories taken from the Township of Ascot.
  - Creation of the United Townships of Egan-et-Kensington.
- 20 March: Creation of the Parish of **Saint-Damien** from territories taken from the Parish of Saint-Gabriel-de-Brandon.
- 20 May: Creation of the Parish of Notre-Dame-du-Lac.
- 15 June: Creation of the Parish of Saint-Basile-le-Grand from territories taken from the Parish of Saint-Bruno-de-Montarville and the Parish of Saint-Joseph-de-Chambly.

=== 1872 ===
- 1 January:
  - The Parish of Saint-Roch changed its name to Saint-Sauveur.
  - Creation of the Township of Hincks.
- 31 January: Creation of the Parish of Sainte-Monique from territories taken from the Parish of Saint-Augustin, the Parish of Saint-Canut, the Parish of Saint-Janvier-de-Blainville, the Parish of Sainte-Scholastique and the Parish of Sainte-Thérèse-de-Blainville.
- 11 March: Creation of the Parish of Saint-Félix-du-Cap-Rouge from territories taken from the Parish of Ancienne-Lorette and the Parish of Saint-Foye.
- 6 June: Creation of the Parish of Saint-Patrice-de-Beaurivage from territories taken from the Parish of Saint-Gilles and the Parish of Saint-Sylvestre-de-Beaurivage.
- 24 August: The Municipality of Saint-André-Avellin became a Parish.
- 11 September: Creation of the Parish of Sainte-Marie-de-Blandford from territories taken from the Parish of Sainte-Gertrude.
- 29 October: Creation of the Parish of Saint-Fortunat-de-Wolfestown from territories taken from the Township of Wolfestown.
- 24 December:
  - Creation of the Municipality of **Saint-Tite-des-Caps** from territories taken from the Parish of **Saint-Joachim**.
  - The Village of Lachine became a Town.

=== 1873 ===
- 1 January:
  - Creation of the Village of Beebe Plain from territories taken from the Township of **Stanstead**.
  - Creation of the Village of Bryson from territories taken from the Township of Litchfield.
  - Creation of the Village of Napierville from territories taken from the Parish of Saint-Cyprien.
  - Creation of the Parish of Saint-Côme.
  - Creation of the Parish of Saint-François-Xavier from territories taken from the Parish of Saint-Modeste and the Township of Viger.
  - Creation of the Parish of Saint-Fulgence from territories taken from the Municipality of Bagotville-Partie-Nord-Ouest-du-Township-de-Bagot and the Township of Tremblay.
  - Creation of the Parish of Saint-Jérôme from territories taken from the Municipality of **Hébertville** and the Municipality of Roberval.
  - Creation of the Parish of Saint-Louis-de-Métabetchouan from territories taken from the Municipality of Roberval.
  - Creation of the Parish of Saint-Pierre-de-la-Pointe-aux-Esquimaux.
  - Creation of the Parish of Saint-Prime from territories taken from the Municipality of Roberval.
  - Creation of the Parish of Saint-Ubalde from territories taken from the Parish of Saint-Casimir.
  - The Township of Denonville became the Parish of Saint-Paul-de-la-Croix.
  - Creation of the Township of Ireland-Nord from territories taken from the Municipality of Ireland-et-Coleraine.
- 1 February: Creation of the Town of **Nicolet** from territories taken from the Parish of Saint-Jean-Baptiste-de-Nicolet.
- 29 September: Creation of the Parish of **Saint-Joseph-de-Lepage** from territories taken from the Parish of **Sainte-Flavie**.
- 6 December: Creation of the Parish of **Sainte-Françoise** from territories taken from the Municipality of Trois-Pistoles.
- 9 December: Creation of the Village of Gaspé from territories taken from the Municipality of Baie-de-Gaspé-Sud.
- 23 December: Creation of the Parish of **Saint-Léon-de-Standon** and the Parish of Sainte-Germaine-du-Lac-Etchemin.

=== 1874 ===
- 1 January:
  - Creation of the Municipality of Clifton from territories taken from the Township of Clifton.
  - The Municipality of Whitton is split into the Township of **Hampden**, the Township of **Marston** and the Township of Whitton.
  - Creation of the Village of Beaulieu from territories taken from the Parish of Saint-Pierre.
  - Creation of the Village of Chapeau from territories taken from the Township of Île-Allumettes.
  - Creation of the Village of Dixville from territories taken from the Township of Barford.
  - Creation of the Village of Leclercville from territories taken from the Parish of Sainte-Emmélie-de-Lotbinière.
  - Creation of the Village of Notre-Dame-de-Grâce from territories taken from the Parish of Montreal.
  - Creation of the Village of Shawville from territories taken from the Township of Clarendon.
  - Creation of the Township of Doncaster.
  - Creation of the Township of Partie-Ouest-du-Canton-d’Inverness from territories taken from the Municipality of Inverness.
  - The United Townships of Garthby-et-Stratford are split into the Township of Garthby and the Township of **Stratford**.
- 28 January: The Village of Fraserville became a Town.
- 12 February: The Village of **Longueuil** became a Town.
- 23 April: Creation of the Parish of Saint-Malachie-de-Frampton from territories taken from the Township of Frampton and other unorganized territories.
- 1 May: Creation of the Parish of **Saint-Narcisse-de-Beaurivage** from territories taken from the Parish of Saint-Bernard, the Parish of Saint-Gilles, the Parish of Saint-Lambert-de-Lauzon and the Parish of Saint-Patrice-de-Beaurivage.
- 14 July: Creation of the Parish of **Saint-Louis-du-Ha! Ha!**

=== 1875 ===
- 1 January:
  - Creation of the Town of **Salaberry-de-Valleyfield** from territories taken from the Parish of Sainte-Cécile.
  - The Municipality of Broughton is split into the Township of Broughton and the Township of Thetford.
  - Creation of the Municipality of Hull from territories taken from the Township of Hull.
  - The Municipality of Isles-de-la-Magdeleine is split into the Municipality of Étang-du-Nord, the Municipality of Havre-Aubert and the Municipality of Havre-aux-Maisons.
  - Creation of the Village of Côte-Saint-Paul, the Village of La Rivière-Saint-Pierre and the Village of Saint-Gabriel from territories taken from the Parish of Montreal.
  - Creation of the Village of Drummondville from territories taken from the Township of Grantham.
  - Creation of the Village of Quyon from territories taken from the Township of Onslow.
  - Creation of the Village of Sweetsburgh from territories taken from the Township of Dunham.
  - Creation of the Parish of Saint-Charles-de-Caplan from territories taken from the Township of Hamilton and the Township of New Richmond.
  - Creation of the Parish of Sainte-Thècle from territories taken from the Parish of Saint-Stanislas-de-la-Rivière-des-Envies.
  - Creation of the United Townships of Roux-Bellechasse-et-Daaquam.
- 11 February: Creation of the Parish of Sainte-Brigitte-de-Laval from territories taken from the Parish of Ange-Gardien and the Parish of Château-Richer.
- 23 February:
  - Creation of the City of Hull from the entire Township of Hull and territories taken from the Municipality of Hull and from the Township of Templeton.
  - Creation of the Town of Saint-Henri and the Village of Outre-Mont from territories taken from the Parish of Montreal.
  - Creation of the Parish of Sainte-Pudentienne.
- 20 April: Creation of the Parish of Annonciation from territories taken from the Parish of Saint-Joseph.
- 23 April: Creation of the Parish of **Sainte-Sophie-de-Lévrard** from territories taken from the Parish of Saint-Pierre-les-Becquets.
- 29 July: Creation of the Parish of Saint-Joseph from territories taken from the Parish of Saint-Pierre-de-Sorel.
- 24 December:
  - The Town of **Sherbrooke** became a City.
  - Creation of the Parish of **Saint-Séverin**.
- 29 December:
  - Creation of the Parish of Saint-Lazare from territories taken from the Municipality of Vaudreuil.
  - Creation of the Parish of **Saint-Philippe-de-Néri**.

=== 1876 ===
- 1 January:
  - Creation of the Municipality of Onslow from territories taken from the Township of Onslow.
  - Creation of the Municipality of Pabos from territories taken from the Municipality of Newport.
  - Creation of the Village of Cowansville from territories taken from the Township of Dunham.
  - Creation of the Village of **Grenville** from territories taken from the Township of Grenville.
  - Creation of the Village of La Pointe-à-Gatineau from territories taken from the Township of Templeton.
  - Creation of the Village of Waterville from territories taken from the Township of Compton.
  - Creation of the Village of Windsor-Mills from territories taken from the Township of Windsor.
  - Creation of the United Township of Bigelow-Wells-Blake-et-McGill.
  - The United Townships of Newport-Ditton-Chesham-et-Clinton are split into the Township of Newport and the United Townships of Ditton-Chesham-et-Clinton.
- 13 January: Creation of the Parish of Saint-David-de-l’Aube-Rivière from territories taken from the Parish of Notre-Dame-de-la-Victoire.
- 1 February: Creation of the Village of Bagotville from territories taken from the Municipality of Bagotville-Partie-Nord-Ouest-du-Township-de-Bagot.
- 26 April: Creation of the Parish of Saint-Telesphore from territories taken from the Parish of Notre-Dame-de-la-Victoire.
- 17 July: Creation of the Parish of Notre-Dame-du-Sacré-Cœur from territories taken from the Parish of Saint-Germain-de-Rimouski.
- 27 December: The United Townships of Ditton-Chesham-et-Clinton are split into the Township of Chesham and the United Townships of Ditton-et-Clinton.
- 28 December:
  - The Village of Farnham-Ouest became the Town of **Farnham**.
  - The Village of La Rivière-Saint-Pierre changed its name to Verdun.
  - Creation of the Village of Notre-Dame-de-Grâce-Ouest from territories taken from the Village of Notre-Dame-de-Grâce.
  - Creation of the Village of Pointe-au-Pic from territories taken from the Parish of Saint-Étienne-de-Murray-Bay.
  - Creation of the Village of Sainte-Cunégonde from territories taken from the Town of Saint-Henri.
  - The Township of Bolton is split into the Municipality of **Bolton-Est** and the Municipality of **Bolton-Ouest**.
  - The Township of Malbay is split into the Parish of Saint-Pierre-de-la-Malbaie-Numéro-Un and the Parish of Saint-Pierre-de-la-Malbaie-Numéro-Deux.

=== 1877 ===
- 1 January:
  - Création of the Municipality of Méchins from territories taken from the Municipality of Grand-Méchin.
  - Création of the Village of Como from territories taken from the Municipality of Vaudreuil.
  - Creation of the Parish of Ange-Gardien from territories taken from the Township of Buckingham.
  - Creation of the Parish of Saint-Gabriel.
  - The United Townships of Alleyn-Cawood-et-Thorne is split into the Township of Thorne and the United Townships of Alleyn-et-Cawood.
- 1 February: The Township of Cox is split into the Municipality of **New Carlisle** and the Municipality of Paspébiac.
- 19 April: Creation of the Parish of Saint-Télesphore from territories taken from the Municipality of Nouvelle-Longueuil.
- 21 April: Creation of the Parish of Saint-Alexis from territories taken from the Township of Hunterstown.
- 14 May: Creation of the Parish of Sainte-Anne from territories taken from the Parish of Saint-Pierre-de-Sorel.
- 12 December: Creation of the Township of **Aumond**.

=== 1878 ===
- 1 January:
  - The Municipality of Méchins became the United Townships of Dalibaire-et-Romieu.
  - Creation of the Municipality of **Saint-Pierre-de-Broughton** from territories taken from the Township of Broughton.
  - Creation of the Village of **Hemmingford** from territories taken from the Township of **Hemmingford**.
  - Creation of the Village of Upton from territories taken from the Parish of Saint-Éphrem-d’Upton.
  - Creation of the Parish of **Saint-Moïse** from territories taken from the Parish of Saint-Octave-de-Métis and the Township of MacNider.
  - Creation of the Township of Aldfield from territories taken from the Township of Onslow.
  - Creation of the United Townships of Arundel-et-Desalaberry from territories taken from the Township of **Harrington**.
- 9 March:
  - The Municipality of Sainte-Brigitte became the Parish of **Sainte-Brigitte-des-Saults**.
  - Creation of the Village of Saint-Louis-du-Mile-End from territories taken from the Village of La Côte-Saint-Louis.
  - Creation of the Parish of Côte-Saint-Paul from territories taken from the Village of Côte-Saint-Paul and a remnant of the Parish of Montreal.
  - Creation of the Parish of Saint-Samuel from territories taken from the Municipality of Saint-Léonard, the Municipality of **Sainte-Eulalie**, the Parish of Saint-Valère-de-Bulstrode and the Parish of Sainte-Clothilde-de-Horton.
  - Creation of the Parish of **Sainte-Perpétue** from territories taken from the Parish of Sainte-Monique and the United Townships of Wendover-et-Simpson.
- 18 April: Creation of the Village of Sainte-Anne-de-Bellevue from territories taken from the Municipality of Bout-de-l'Isle.
- 24 July: Creation of the Parish of Sainte-Théodosie from territories taken from the Municipality of Verchères.
- 7 August: Creation of the Village of La-Rivière-du-Loup from territories taken from the Municipality of Rivière-du-Loup-en-Haut.

=== 1879 ===
- 1 January:
  - Creation of the Municipality of Saint-Joseph-d’Alma from territories taken from the Municipality of **Hébertville** and other unorganized territories.
  - Creation of the Township of Emberton from territories taken from the Parish of Eaton.
  - Creation of the Village of Montebello from territories taken from the Municipality of La Petite-Nation.
  - The Township of Ham-Sud is split into the Municipality of Sud-Ouest-du-Canton-de-Ham and the Parish of Saint-Joseph-de-Ham-Sud.
- 2 April: Creation of the Municipality of Partie-Ouest-du-Canton-de-Douglas from territories taken from the Township of Douglas.
- 13 August: Creation of the Parish of **Sainte-Marie-Madeleine** from territories taken from the Parish of La Présentation, the Parish of Saint-Charles, the Parish of Saint-Damase, the Parish of Saint-Hilaire, the Parish of Saint-Hyacinthe and the Parish of Saint-Jean-Baptiste-de-Rouville.
- 31 October:
  - Creation of the Municipality of Saint-Eugène-de-Grantham from territories taken from the Parish of Saint-Germain and the Parish of Sainte-Hélène.
  - The Village of Chicoutimi became a Town.
  - The Village of Notre-Dame-de-Grâce changed its name to Côte-Saint-Antoine.

=== 1880 ===
- 1 January:
  - Creation of the Municipality of Hull from territories taken from the Municipality of Hull.
  - The Village of La-Rivière-du-Loup became the Town of **Louiseville**.
  - Creation of the Township of Marston-Sud from territories taken from the Township of **Marston**.
  - Creation of the Township of Tessier from territories taken from the Municipality of Matane.
  - The United Townships of Ditton-et-Clinton became the Township of Ditton.
- 28 August: Creation of the Village of Pointe-Fortune and the Village of Rigaud from territories taken from the Municipality of Rigaud.
- 30 October: Creation of the Village of Mont-Joli from territories taken from the Parish of **Sainte-Flavie**.
- 29 December: Creation of the Parish of Des Saints-Anges from territories taken from the Parish of Saint-Joseph-de-la-Beauce and the Parish of Sainte-Marie-de-la-Nouvelle-Beauce.
- 30 December: Creation of the Parish of Très-Saint-Rédempteur from territories taken from the Municipality of Rigaud and the Parish of Sainte-Marthe.

=== 1881 ===
- 1 January:
  - Creation of the Township of Armand from territories taken from the Parish of Saint-Modeste.
  - Creation of the Township of Wolfe.
  - The United Townships of Arundel-et-Desalaberry are split into the Township of **Arundel** and the United Townships of DeSalaberry-et-Grandison.
  - The United Townships of Egan-et-Kensington are split into the Township of Egan and the Township of Kensington.
  - The United Townships of Hartwell-et-Suffolk are split into the Township of Hartwell and the Township of Suffolk.
- 26 March: Creation of the Village of Notre-Dame-d’Hébertville from territories taken from the Municipality of **Hébertville**.
- 29 August: Creation of the Parish of Saint-Louis from territories taken from the Parish of Saint-Aimé, the Parish of Saint-Hugues, the Parish of Saint-Marcel and the Parish of Sainte-Victoire.

=== 1882 ===
- 1 January:
  - Creation of the Municipality of Est-du-Township-de-Tingwick from territories taken from the Municipality of Chénier and the Municipality of Tingwick.
  - Creation of the Municipality of Saint-Félicien from territories taken from the Parish of Saint-Prime.
  - Creation of the Township of Clyde.
  - Creation of the Township of Partie-Est-du-Township-de-Leeds from territories taken from the Township of Leeds.
  - Creation of the United Townships of Spaulding-and-Ditchfield from territories taken from the Municipality of Linière.
- 8 March: Creation of the Township of Ponsonboy.
- 1 May: Creation of the Parish of Sainte-Philomène-de-Fortierville from territories taken from the Parish of Saint-Jean-Deschaillons.
- 27 May:
  - The Village of **Richmond** became a Town.
  - Creation of the Parish of Notre-Dame-des-Anges-de-Montauban from territories taken from the Parish of Saint-Ubalde.
- 10 October: Creation of the Parish of Sainte-Anne-de-la-Pointe-au-Père from territories taken from the Parish of Saint-Germain-de-Rimouski and the Parish of Sainte-Luce.

=== 1883 ===
- 1 January:
  - Creation of the Municipality of D'Israëli from territories taken from the Township of Garthby and the Township of **Stratford**.
  - Creation of the Municipality of Sainte-Anastasie-de-Nelson from territories taken from the Township of Nelson.
  - Creation of the Parish of Notre-Dame-de-Laterrière and the Parish of Saint-Dominique-de-Jonquières from territories taken from the Municipality of Chicoutimi.
  - Creation of the Parish of Sainte-Barbe from territories taken from the Municipality of Saint-Anicet.
  - Creation of the Township of Hocquart from territories taken from the Parish of **Saint-Éloi**.
  - Creation of the Township of Howard.
  - Creation of the Township of Joly.
- 22 February: The Township of Port-Daniel is split into the Municipality of Partie-Est-du-Township-de-Port-Daniel and the Municipality of Partie-Ouest-du-Township-de-Port-Daniel.
- 30 March:
  - The Municipality of La Petite-Nation became the Parish of Notre-Dame-de-Bonsecours.
  - The Village of Hochelaga became the Town of Hochélaga.
  - The Village of **Montmagny** became a Town.
  - The Village of Saint-Lin became the Town of Laurentides.
- 5 September: Creation of the Village of Roberval from territories taken from the Municipality of Roberval.
- 27 December: The Town of Hochélaga became the Town of Maisonneuve.

=== 1884 ===
- 1 January:
  - The Municipality of Est-du-Township-de-Tingwick became the Parish of Saint-Rémi-de-Tingwick.
  - The Village of **Coaticook** became a Town.
  - Creation of the Parish of Sainte-Blandine from territories taken from the Parish of Saint-Germain-de-Rimouski.
  - The Township of Hamilton became the Parish of Saint-Bonaventure-de-Hamilton.
- 10 January: Creation of the Township of Gayhurst from territories taken from the Municipality of Linière.
- 10 June:
  - Creation of the Municipality of **Saint-Maxime-du-Mont-Louis** from territories taken from the Municipality of Sainte-Anne-des-Monts.
  - The Village of Saint-Jean-Baptiste became a Town.
  - The Village of Sainte-Cunégonde became a Town.
  - The Parish of Notre-Dame is annexed by the Village of Notre-Dame-de-Grâce-Ouest.
  - Creation of the Parish of Saint-Joachim-de-Shefford.
  - Creation of the Parish of Sainte-Émélie-de-l'Énergie from territories taken from the Parish of Saint-Côme and the Parish of Saint-Jean-de-Matha.

=== 1885 ===
- 1 January:
  - Creation of the Municipality of Saint-Norbert-du-Cap-Chatte from territories takem from the Municipality of Sainte-Anne-des-Monts.
  - Creation of the Parish of **Notre-Dame-Auxiliatrice-de-Buckland** from territories taken from the Township of Buckland and the Township of Mailloux.
  - Creation of the Parish of Saint-Clément from territories taken from the Township of Bégon and the Township of Hocquart.
  - Creation of the Parish of Saint-Michel-des-Saints.
  - Creation of the Township of **Cloridorme**.
  - Creation of the United Townships of Bowman-et-Villeneuve.
- 9 January: Creation of the Village of Megantic from territories taken from the Township of Whitton.
- 2 April:
  - Creation of the Parish of Sainte-Clothilde from territories taken from the Parish of Saint-Jean-Chrysostome.
  - Creation of the Parish of Très-Saint-Sacrement from territories taken from the Parish of Saint-Jean-Chrysostome, the Parish of Saint-Malachie-d’Ormstown and the Parish of Sainte-Martine.
- 9 May: Creation of the Town of **Lachute** from territories taken from the Parish of Saint-Jérusalem-d’Argenteuil.
- 19 June: Creation of the Parish of **Saint-Valérien** from territories taken from the Parish of Sainte-Cécile-du-Bic.
- 10 August: Creation of the Parish of Saint-Jacques-des-Piles from territories taken from the Parish of Saint-Stanislas-de-la-Rivière-des-Envies, the Parish of Sainte-Flore and other unorganized territories.
- 9 September: Creation of the Township of Bourget.
- 24 September: Creation of the Parish of Sainte-Rose-du-Dégelé.
- 3 October: The Township of Thetford is split into the Municipality of Nord-du-Canton-de-Thetford and the Municipality of Sud-du-Canton-de-Thetford.
- 31 October: Creation of the Township of Metgermette-Nord from territories taken from the Municipality of Linière.
- 31 December: Creation of the Parish of **Saint-Damase** from territories taken from the Township of MacNider.

=== 1886 ===
- 1 January:
  - Creation of the Municipality of Saint-Bruno from territories taken from the Municipality of **Hébertville**.
  - Creation of the Municipality of Saint-Méthode from territories taken from the Municipality of Saint-Félicien.
  - The Township of Suffolk became the United Townships of Suffolk-et-Addington.
- 12 January: Creation of the Village of Sainte-Pudentienne from territories taken from the Parish of Sainte-Pudentienne.
- 15 January: The Town of Saint-Jean-Baptiste is annexed by the City of **Montréal**.
- 16 January: Creation of the Village of Thurso from territories taken from the Township of **Lochaber**.
- 12 March: Creation of the Municipality of Saint-Benoît from territories taken from the Parish of Saint-Antoine-de-la-Baie-du-Febvre, the Parish of Saint-Thomas-de-Pierreville and the Parish of **Saint-Zéphirin-de-Courval**.
- 7 April: Creation of the Parish of Saint-Léonard-de-Port-Maurice from territories taken from the Parish of La Visitation-du Sault-au-Récollet and the Parish of Longue-Pointe.
- 21 June:
  - The Municipality of Saint-Benoît became the Parish of **Saint-Elphège**.
  - Creation of the Village of Lac-Weedon from territories taken from the Township of Weedon.
  - The Parish of Lachine changed its name to Saints-Anges-de-Lachine.
  - The Township of Templeton is split into the Municipality of Templeton-Est and the Municipality of Templeton-Ouest.
- 30 June: Creation of the Parish of Saint-Mathieu from territories taken from the Township of Shawenegan.
- 9 December: Creation of the Municipality of Marchand.

=== 1887 ===
- 1 January:
  - The Village of Saint-Gabriel is annexed by the City of **Montréal**.
  - Creation of the Township of Woodbridge.
- 20 January: Creation of the Parish of Saint-Michel-de-Rougemont from territories taken from the Parish of Saint-Césaire, the Parish of Saint-Damase and the Parish of Saint-Hyacinthe.
- 10 February:
  - Creation of the Village of Rivière-Beaudette from territories taken from the Parish of Saint-Zotique.
  - Creation of the Village of Station-du-Coteau from territories taken from the Municipality of Nouvelle-Longueuil.
- 14 February: Creation of the Village of Saint-Polycarpe from territories taken from the Municipality of Nouvelle-Longueuil.
- 9 March: Creation of the Township of **Amherst**.
- 18 March: Creation of the Village of Pierreville from territories taken from the Parish of Saint-Thomas-de-Pierreville.
- 29 March: Creation of the Parish of Saint-Nérée from territories taken from the Parish of Saint-Gervais-et-Saint-Protais, the Parish of Saint-Lazare and the Parish of Saint-Raphaël.
- 5 April: Creation of the Village of Yamachiche from territories taken from the Municipality of Yamachiche.
- 18 May:
  - Creation of the Village of Weedon-Centre from territories taken from the Township of Weedon.
  - Creation of the Parish of Sainte-Elizabeth-de-Warwick from territories taken from the Municipality of Chutes-de-Kingsey and the Township of Warwick.
- 20 September: Creation of the Village of Carillon from territories taken from the Municipality of Argenteuil.
- 26 September:
  - The Township of Partie-Ouest-du-Canton-d’Inverness became the Parish of **Saint-Pierre-Baptiste**.
  - Creation of the Township of Watford West from territories taken from the Township of Cranbourne and other unorganized territories.
- 21 July: The Parish of Saint-Sauveur became the Village of Saint-Sauveur-de-Québec.
- 9 December: Creation of the Parish of Saint-Gédéon from territories taken from the Municipality of **Hébertville**.
- 28 December:
  - Creation of the Parish of Saint-François-Xavier-de-Brompton from territories taken from the Township of Brompton.
  - Creation of the Parish of Saint-Sylvère from territories taken from the Parish of Sainte-Gertrude.

=== 1888 ===
- 1 January:
  - The Village of **L'Assomption** became a Town.
  - The Township of Buckland is closed and dissolved.
- 21 January: The Municipality of Chemins-Elgin-et-Taché is split into the Municipality of Saint-Pamphile and the Municipality of **Sainte-Perpétue**.
- 26 January: Creation of the Municipality of Adstock from territories taken from the Municipality of Saint-Éphrem-de-Tring.
- 28 January: Creation of the Village of Magog from territories taken from the Township of Magog.
- 1 March: Creation of the Parish of **Sainte-Anne-de-Sabrevois** from territories taken from the Parish of Saint-Athanase and the Parish of Saint-Georges.
- 14 May: Creation of the Municipality of **Saint-François-de-Sales** from territories taken from the Municipality of Saint-Louis-de-Métabetchouan.
- 15 May: Creation of the Municipality of Shenley-Dorset-Jersey-et-Marlow from territories taken from the Municipality of Linière and the Parish of Saint-Georges.
- 6 July: Creation of the Village of Knowlton from territories taken from the Township of Brome.
- 12 July:
  - Creation of the Municipality of Témiscaming.
  - The Village of **Drummondville** became a Town.
- 10 December:
  - Creation of the Village of Eastman from territories taken from the Municipality of **Bolton-Est**.
  - Creation of the Village of **Fort-Coulonge** from territories taken from the Township of Mansfield.
- 26 December: Creation of the Village of Shefford-Ouest from territories taken from the Township of **Shefford**.
- 27 December: Creation of the Parish of Sainte-Marie-Salomée.

=== 1889 ===
- 22 February: Creation of the Village of New Rockland from territories taken from the Township of **Melbourne**.
- 21 March:
  - The Municipality of Notre-Dame-des-Anges-de-Stanbridge became the Parish of Notre-Dame-de-Stanbridge.
  - Creation of the Municipality of **Stanbridge Station** and the Parish of Saint-Ignace-de-Stanbridge from territories taken from the Township of Stanbridge.
  - The Village of Côte-des-Neiges is split into the Town of Notre-Dame-des-Neiges and the Village of Notre-Dame-des-Neiges-Ouest.
  - Creation of the Parish of Sainte-Anne-du-Sault.
- 1 July: The Town of Sorel became a City.
- 12 September: Creation of the Municipality of Hull from territories taken from the Municipality of Hull.
- 19 September: Creation of the Municipality of Whitton from territories taken from the Township of Whitton.
- 27 September: The Village of Saint-Sauveur-de-Québec is annexed by **Quebec City**.
- 3 October: Creation of the Village of Saint-Joseph from territories taken from the Parish of Saint-Joseph-de-la-Beauce.
- 18 December: Creation of the Village of Ormstown from territories taken from the Parish of Saint-Malachie-d’Ormstown.

=== 1890 ===
- 30 January: The Municipality of Saint-Antoine became the Parish of Saint-Antoine-de-Padoue.
- 2 April:
  - Creation of the Town of **Bedford** from territories taken from the Township of Stanbridge.
  - The Town of Sainte-Cunégonde became the City of Sainte-Cunégonde-de-Montréal.
  - The Village of Acton-Vale became the Town of Acton.
  - The Village of Buckingham became a Town.
  - The Village of Côte-Saint-Antoine became a Town.
  - The Village of La Côte-Saint-Louis became the Town of Côte-Saint-Louis.
  - The Village of **Magog** became a Town.
  - The Village of Victoriaville is split into the Town of Victoriaville and the Parish of Sainte-Victoire-d’Arthabaska.
- 11 April: Creation of the Parish of **Saint-Séverin** from territories taken from the Parish of Saint-Stanislas-de-la-Rivière-des-Envies and the Parish of Saint-Tite.
- 18 April: Creation of the United Townships of Normandin-et-d’Albanel from territories taken from the Municipality of Saint-Félicien.
- 20 May: Creation of the Parish of Saint-Benoît-Joseph-Labre.
- 10 June: Creation of the Township of Delisle.
- 18 August: Creation of the Parish of Saint-Pierre-du-Lac.
- 20 December: Creation of the Parish of **Saint-Damien-de-Buckland**.
- 30 December:
  - The Village of Aylmer became a Town.
  - The Village of **Waterloo** became a Town.
  - Creation of the Parish of Saint-Alphonse from territories taken from the Township of Farnham-Est and the Township of Granby.
  - The Township of Armagh became the Parish of Saint-Cajetan-d’Armagh.

=== 1891 ===
- 20 April: Creation of the Township of Lochaber from territories taken from the Township of **Lochaber**.
- 1 June: Creation of the Village of Dorion from territories taken from the Municipality of Vaudreuil.
- 2 July: Creation of the Parish of **Saint-Adelphe** from territories taken from the Parish of Saint-Stanislas-de-la-Rivière-des-Envies.
- 11 November: The Municipality of Ireland-et-Coleraine is split into the Parish of Saint-Désiré-du-Lac-Noir and the Township of Ireland-Sud.
- 28 December: Creation of the Village of Deschaillons from territories taken from the Parish of Saint-Jean-Deschaillons.

=== 1892 ===
- 1 January: The Township of Mailloux became the Parish of **Saint-Philémon**.
- 27 January:
  - The Township of Cranbourne became the Parish of Saint-Odilon-de-Cranbourne.
  - The Township of Frampton became the Parish of Saint-Édouard-de-Frampton.
  - The Township of Langevin became the Parish of Sainte-Justine.
- 1 April: Creation of the Municipality of Wakefield from territories taken from the Township of Wakefield.
- 22 April: The Parish of Saint-François-Xavier is dissolved and its territory is split between the Parish of Saint-Modeste and the Township of Viger.
- 19 May: Creation of the Village of Rock Island from territories taken from the Township of **Stanstead**.
- 24 June:
  - Creation of the Town of Cookshire from territories taken from the Municipality of Eaton.
  - Creation of the Town of **Scotstown** from territories taken from the Township of **Hampden** and the Township of **Lingwick**.
  - Creation of the Village of Dorval from territories taken from the Parish of Saints-Anges-de-Lachine.
  - Creation of the Parish of Saint-Côme-de-Kennebec from territories taken from the Municipality of Linière.
- 16 August: The Municipality of Saint-Lambert became a Village.
- 20 August: Creation of the Parish of Saint-Blaise from territories taken from the Parish of Saint-Cyprien, the Parish of Saint-Jean-l’Évangéliste, the Parish of Saint-Valentin and the Parish of Sainte-Marguerite-de-Blairfindie.
- 3 September: Creation of the Village of Sawyerville from territories taken from the Municipality of Eaton.
- 22 September: Creation of the Village of Kingsville from territories taken from the Municipality of Sud-du-Canton-de-Thetford, the Parish of Saint-Désiré-du-Lac-Noir and the Township of Ireland-Nord.
- 26 October: The Municipality of Marchand became a Township.
- 19 November: Creation of the Municipality of **Grosse-Île** from territories taken from the Municipality of Havre-aux-Maisons.
- 17 December: Creation of the Village of Saint-Gabriel-de-Brandon from territories taken from the Parish of Saint-Gabriel-de-Brandon.
- 30 December: Creation of the Township of La Minerve.

=== 1893 ===
- 7 February: Creation of the Township of Lochaber from territories taken from the Township of **Lochaber**.
- 27 February: The Municipality of Saint-Roch-de-Québec-Nord is split into the Municipality of Limoilou and the Municipality of Saint-Malo.
- 25 March: Creation of the Village of Baie-Saint-Paul from territories taken from the Parish of Baie-Saint-Paul.
- 1 April: Creation of the Village of Saint-Jérôme-de-Matane from territories taken from the Municipality of Matane.
- 27 April: Creation of the Parish of **Saint-Gilbert** from territories taken from the Municipality of Deschambault.
- 12 June: Creation of the Village of Compton from territories taken from the Township of Compton.
- 24 June: Creation of the Town of Saint-Laurent from territories taken from the Parish of Saint-Laurent.
- 29 June: Creation of the Parish of Saint-Germain from territories taken from the Parish of Kamouraska, the Parish of Saint-André, the Parish of Saint-Paschal-de-Kamouraska and the Parish of Sainte-Hélène.
- 23 August: Creation of the Parish of Saint-Thomas-d’Aquin from territories taken from the Parish of La Présentation and the Parish of Saint-Hyacinthe.
- 3 November: Creation of the Municipality of Saint-Thomas-d’Aquin from territories taken from the Municipality of **Saint-François-de-Sales**.
- 5 December: Creation of the Village of Sainte-Anne-de-Chicoutimi from territories taken from the Township of Tremblay.
- 19 December: The Town of Côte-Saint-Louis is annexed by the City of **Montréal**.

=== 1894 ===
- 1 January:
  - Creation of the Village of Saint-Pierre-aux-Liens from territories taken from the Village of Notre-Dame-de-Grâces-Ouest.
  - The Township of Hartwell became the United Townships of Hartwell-et-Preston.
- 4 January:
  - Creation of the Parish of Saint-Benoît-Labre from territories taken from the Municipality of Saint-Victor-de-Tring, the Parish of Saint-François, the Parish of Saint-Georges and the Township of Shenley.
  - Creation of the Parish of Saint-Hubert.
- 8 January:
  - The Town of Saint-Henri became a City.
  - The Village of Côte-Saint-Paul became a Town.
  - Creation of the Parish of **Saint-Nazaire-d’Acton** from territories taken from the Municipality of Wickham-Ouest, the Parish of Saint-Éphrem-d’Upton, the Parish of Saint-Germain and the Parish of Saint-Théodore-d’Acton.
  - Creation of the Parish of **Sainte-Christine** from territories taken from the Municipality of **Durham-Sud** and the Parish of Saint-André-d'Acton.
- 26 January: Creation of the United Townships of Wabassee-Dudley-et-Bouthillier.
- 20 March: The Township of Viger became the Parish of Saint-Épiphane.
- 21 June: Creation of the Parish of Notre-Dame-de-Pierreville from territories taken from the Parish of Saint-François-du-Lac and the Parish of Saint-Thomas-de-Pierreville.
- 29 June: The Municipality of Adstock became the Parish of Saint-Méthode-d’Adstock.
- 13 July: Creation of the Parish of Saint-Théophile-de-la-Beauce from territories taken from the Municipality of Linière and the Municipality of Shenley-Dorset-Jersey-et-Marlow.
- 18 December: Creation of the Municipality of **Notre-Dame-du-Rosaire** from territories taken from the Township of Ashburton and the Township of Montminy.

=== 1895 ===
- 12 January:
  - The Town of Côte-Saint-Antoine changed its name to **Westmount**.
  - Creation of the Town of Summerlea from territories taken from the Parish of Saints-Anges-de-Lachine.
  - The Village of La Côte-la-Visitation is split into the Village of Lorimier and the Village of Petite-Côte.
  - The Village of Outre-Mont became the Town of Outremont.
  - The Village of **Sainte-Anne-de-Bellevue** became a Town.
  - Creation of the Village of **Senneville** from territories taken from the Municipality of Bout-de-l’Isle.
- 4 February: The Village of **Saint-Jérôme** became a Town.
- 13 March: Creation of the Municipality of Saint-Alban-du-Cap-des-Rosiers from territories taken from the Municipality of Anse-aux-Griffons and the Municipality of Cap-des-Rosiers.
- 25 March: Creation of the Parish of Saint-Théophile from territories taken from the Parish of **Notre-Dame-du-Mont-Carmel** and the Parish of Saint-Jacques-des-Piles.
- 1 April: Creation of the Parish of Sainte-Marie-de-Sayabec.
- 22 April: Creation of the Village of Agnès from territories taken from the United Townships of Spaulding and Ditchfield.
- 11 July: Creation of the Parish of La Présentation-de-la-Sainte-Vierge from territories taken from the Parish of Saint-Laurent and the Parish of Saints-Anges-de-Lachine.
- 7 October: Creation of the Parish of Saint-Zénon.
- 31 October: Creation of the Village of Marbleton from territories taken from the Municipality of Dudswell.
- 21 December:
  - The Village of Saint-Louis-du-Mile-End became the Town of Saint-Louis.
  - Creation of the Township of **Sainte-Edwidge-de-Clifton** from territories taken from the Township of Clifton.

=== 1896 ===
- 18 March: Creation of the Village of Malbaie from territories taken from the Parish of Saint-Étienne-de-Murray-Bay.
- 10 April: Creation of the Parish of Sainte-Christine.
- 23 May: Creation of the Parish of **Saint-Rosaire** from territories taken from the Parish of Saint-Valère-de-Bulstrode, the Parish of Sainte-Victoire-d'Arthabaska and the Township of Stanfold.
- 15 June: Creation of the Township of Loranger.
- 7 July:
  - Creation of the Village of **Kingsbury** from territories taken from the Township of **Melbourne**.
  - Creation of the Village of Sainte-Agathe-des-Monts from territories taken from the Parish of Sainte-Agathe.
- 30 September:
  - Creation of the Village of Papineauville from territories taken from the Parish of Sainte-Angélique.
  - Creation of the Village of Villeray from territories taken from the Parish of La Visitation-du-Sault-au-Récollet.
- 25 November:
  - Creation of the Village of Annaville from territories taken from the Municipality of **Saint-Célestin**.
  - Creation of the Village of Sutton from territories taken from the Township of Sutton.
- 17 December: Creation of the Village of Beaulac from territories taken from the Township of Garthby.
- 24 December: Creation of the Municipality of Saint-Michel-de-Mistassini from territories taken from the Municipality of Saint-Méthode and other unorganized territories.

=== 1897 ===
- 9 January:
  - The Town of Côte-Saint-Paul changed its name to Saint-Paul.
  - Creation of the Town of **Montreal-Ouest** from territories taken from the Village of Notre-Dame-de-Grâces-Ouest.
  - Creation of the Municipality of **Saint-Benjamin** from territories taken from the Parish of Saint-François and the Parish of Saint-Georges.
  - Creation of the Village of Petit-Métis from territories taken from the Parish of Saint-Octave-de-Métis and the Township of MacNider.
  - Creation of the Parish of Saint-Maxime from territories taken from the Parish of Saint-Bernard, the Parish of Saint-Isidore-de-Lauzon and the Parish of Sainte-Marie-de-la-Nouvelle-Beauce.
  - Creation of the Parish of Saint-Michel-Archange from territories taken from the Municipality of Beauport and the Municipality of Limoilou.
- 21 January: Creation of the Village of Ahuntsic from territories taken from the Parish of La Visitation-du-Sault-au-Récollet.
- 11 February: Creation of the Parish of Saint-Ignace-de-Loyola from territories taken from the Parish of L’Isle-du-Pads.
- 24 March: Creation of the Village of Masson from territories taken from the Township of Buckingham.
- 10 June: Creation of the Village of Saint-Éphrem-de-Tring from territories taken from the Municipality of Saint-Éphrem-de-Tring.
- 29 July: Creation of the Township of Bergeronnes from territories taken from the Municipality of Escoumains.
- 2 October: Creation of the Parish of Saint-Jacques-le-Majeur-de-Causapscal.
- 7 October:
  - Creation of the Parish of **Notre-Dame-de-Lourdes** from territories taken from the Township of Somerset-Sud and the Township of Stanfold.
  - Creation of the Parish of Saint-Cléophas from territories taken from the Municipality of Saint-Félix-de-Valois.
- 11 October: Creation of the Township of Bois.
- 13 October: Creation of the Village of Ville-Marie from territories taken from the Municipality of Témiscaming.
- 15 October: Creation of the Township of Guigues from territories taken from the Municipality of Témiscaming.
- 25 October: Creation of the Village of **North Hatley** from territories taken from the Township of **Hatley**.
- 11 November: Creation of the Township of Kénogami.
- 17 November: Creation of the Municipality of **Sainte-Rose-de-Watford** from territories taken from the Parish of Sainte-Justine.

=== 1898 ===
- 1 January: Creation of the United Townships of Robertson-et-Pope.
- 3 January: Creation of the Township of Kiamika.
- 15 January:
  - Creation of the Village of Grand-Mère from territories taken from the Parish of Sainte-Flore.
  - The Village of **Saint-Lambert** became a Town.
  - Creation of the Parish of **Notre-Dame-du-Bon-Conseil**.
- 14 February: Creation of the Parish of **Saint-Thuribe** from territories taken from the Parish of Saint-Casimir.
- 21 February: Creation of the Village of Saint-Raymond from territories taken from the Parish of Saint-Raymond-Nonnat.
- 24 February: Creation of the Village of Saint-Benoît from territories taken from the Municipality of Saint-Benoît.
- 21 March: Creation of the Village of Saint-Joseph-de-Bordeaux from territories taken from the Parish of La Visitation-du-Sault-au-Récollet.
- 30 March: Creation of the Village of Beaurivage-de-la-Longue-Pointe from territories taken from the Parish of Longue-Pointe.
- 22 April: Creation of the Village of Bernierville from territories taken from the Township of Halifax-Sud.
- 29 April: Creation of the Village of Saint-Jérôme from territories taken from the Parish of Saint-Jérôme.
- 2 June: Creation of the Township of Saint-Paul-de-Mille-Vaches from territories taken from the Municipality of Escoumains.
- 23 September: Creation of the Parish of Saint-Jean-de-Dieu from territories taken from the Parish of Longue-Pointe.
- 26 September: Creation of the Village of Saint-Joseph from territories taken from the Parish of Saint-Hyacinthe-le-Confesseur.
- 7 October: Creation of the Parish of Notre-Dame-de-Lourdes-de-Ham from territories taken from the Township of Ham-Nord.
- 9 November: Creation of the Township of Ashford.
- 18 November: Creation of the Parish of Saint-Paul-de-l'Île-aux-Noix from territories taken from the Parish of Saint-Valentin.

=== 1899 ===
- 1 January: Creation of the Parish of Saint-Jean-des-Piles from territories taken from the Parish of Saint-Jacques-des-Piles.
- 21 January: Creation of the Village of Asbestos from territories taken from the Township of Shipton.
- 2 February: Creation of the Parish of La Visitation-de-la-Bienheureuse-Vierge-Marie from territories taken from the Parish of Saint-Antoine-de-la-Baie-du-Febvre, the Parish of **Saint-Zéphirin-de-Courval** and the Parish of Sainte-Monique.
- 10 March:
  - The Municipality of Témiscaming became the Township of Duhamel.
  - The Village of Windsor-Mills became a Town.
  - Creation of the Parish of Saint-Élie-d’Orford from territories taken from the Township of **Orford**.
- 28 March: Creation of the Municipality of **Ascot Corner** from territories taken from the Township of Ascot, the Township of Eaton, the Township of Stoke and the Township of **Westbury**.
- 24 April: Creation of the Parish of Saint-Rémi.
- 22 July: Creation of the Parish of Saint-Léonard-de-Port-Maurice from territories taken from the Parish of Saint-Raymond-Nonnat.
- 3 October: Creation of the Township of Albanel from territories taken from the United Townships of Normandin-et-d’Albanel.
- 10 October: Creation of the Village of **Tadoussac** from territories taken from the Municipality of Tadoussac.
- 28 December: Creation of the Village of La Providence from territories taken from the Parish of Saint-Hyacinthe.

== See also ==
- List of municipalities in Quebec
- List of former municipalities in Quebec
