= List of municipalities created in Quebec in 1855 =

This is a list of municipalities created in Quebec on July 1, 1855. They are sorted by the County municipality they are issued from. Municipalities written in bold still currently exist under the same name and status.

== Beauharnois ==
- Municipality of Dundee
- Municipality of Godmanchester
- Municipality of Ormstown
- Municipality of Russeltown
- Municipality of Saint-Anicet
- Parish of Saint-Clément
- Parish of **Saint-Louis-de-Gonzague**
- Parish of Saint-Stanislas-Kostka
- Parish of Saint-Thimothée
- Parish of Saint-Urbain-Premier
- Parish of Sainte-Cécile
- Parish of Sainte-Martine
- Township of Elgin
- Township of **Hemmingford**
- Township of Hinchinbrooke
- Unorganized territory of Beauharnois

== Bellechasse ==
- Parish of Beaumont
- Parish of Berthier-en-Bas
- Parish of Saint-Charles-Boromée
- Parish of Saint-François-de-Sales-de-la-Rivière-du-Sud
- Parish of Saint-Gervais-et-Saint-Protais
- Parish of Saint-Lazare
- Parish of Saint-Michel
- Parish of Saint-Vallier
- Unorganized territory of Bellechasse

== Berthier ==
- Municipality of Berthier-en-Haut
- Municipality of Bienheureux-Alphonse-de-Rodriguez
- Municipality of Saint-Félix-de-Valois
- Municipality of Sainte-Elizabeth
- Municipality of Sainte-Mélanie
- Parish of Conversion-de-Saint-Paul
- Parish of L'Isle-du-Pads
- Parish of Saint-Ambroise-de-Kildare
- Parish of Saint-Antoine-de-la-Valtrie
- Parish of Saint-Barthélemi
- Parish of Saint-Charles-Borromée-du-Village-d'Industrie
- Parish of Saint-Cuthbert
- Parish of Saint-Gabriel-de-Brandon
- Parish of Saint-Jean-de-Matha
- Parish of Saint-Joseph-de-Lanoraie
- Parish of **Saint-Norbert**
- Parish of Saint-Thomas
- Unorganized territory of Berthier

== Bonaventure ==
- Municipality of Shoolbred
- Township of Carleton
- Township of Cox
- Township of Hamilton
- Township of **Hope**
- Township of Mann
- Township of Maria
- Township of Matapédia
- Township of New Richmond
- Township of Port-Daniel
- Township of Ristigouche
- Unorganized territory of Bonaventure

== Chambly ==
- Parish of Boucherville
- Parish of Longueuil
- Parish of Saint-Bruno-de-Montarville
- Parish of Saint-Jean-l’Évangéliste
- Parish of Saint-Joseph-de-Chambly
- Parish of Saint-Luc
- Parish of Sainte-Marguerite-de-Blairfindie
- Unorganized territory of Chambly

== Champlain ==
- Parish of Batiscan
- Parish of Cap-de-la-Magdeleine
- Parish of Champlain
- Parish of **Saint-Maurice**
- Parish of **Saint-Narcisse**
- Parish of Saint-Prosper
- Parish of Saint-Stanislas-de-la-Rivière-des-Envies
- Parish of Sainte-Anne-de-la-Pérade
- Parish of Sainte-Geneviève
- Unorganized territory of Champlain

== Dorchester ==
- Municipality of Aubert-Gallion
- Municipality of Metschermet
- Parish of Notre-Dame-de-la-Victoire
- Parish of Pointe-Lévi
- Parish of Saint-Anselme
- Parish of Saint-Bernard
- Parish of Saint-Elzéar-de-Linière
- Parish of Saint-François
- Parish of Saint-Hémédine
- Parish of Saint-Henri
- Parish of Saint-Joseph-de-la-Beauce
- Parish of Saint-Isidore-de-Lauzon
- Parish of Saint-Jean-Chrysostôme
- Parish of Saint-Lambert-de-Lauzon
- Parish of Saint-Nicolas
- Parish of Saint-Romuald-d’Etchemin
- Parish of Sainte-Claire
- Parish of **Sainte-Marguerite**
- Parish of Sainte-Marie-de-la-Nouvelle-Beauce
- Township of Cranbourne
- Township of Frampton
- Unorganized territory of Dorchester

== Drummond ==
- Municipality of Aston
- Municipality of Blandford
- Municipality of Durham
- Municipality of Grantham
- Municipality of Kingsey
- Municipality of Upton
- Municipality of Warwick
- Parish of **Saint-Christophe-d'Arthabaska**
- Parish of Saint-Éphrem-d'Upton
- Parish of Saint-Norbert-d’Arthabaska
- Township of Acton
- Township of Bulstrode
- Township of Horton
- Township of Stanfold
- Township of Tingwick
- Township of Wickham
- Township of Wotton
- United Townships of Ham
- Unorganized territory of Drummond

== Gaspé ==
- Municipality of Baie-de-Gaspé-Nord
- Municipality of Baie-de-Gaspé-Sud
- Municipality of Grande-Rivière
- Municipality of Isles-de-la-Magdeleine
- Municipality of Newport
- Township of Cap-Rosier
- Township of Douglas
- Township of Fox
- Township of Malbay
- Township of Percé
- Unorganized territory of Gaspé

== Huntingdon ==
- Municipality of Caughnawaga
- Municipality of Lacolle
- Municipality of Laprairie
- Municipality of Saint-Édouard
- Municipality of Saint-Jacques-le-Mineur
- Parish of Saint-Constant
- Parish of Saint-Cyprien
- Parish of **Saint-Isidore**
- Parish of Saint-Joachim-de-Châteauguay
- Parish of Saint-Michel
- Parish of Saint-Patrice
- Parish of Saint-Philippe
- Parish of Saint-Rémi
- Parish of Saint-Valentin
- Parish of Sainte-Philomène
- Unorganized territory of Huntingdon

== Kamouraska ==
- Municipality of Mont-Carmel
- Municipality of **Rivière-Ouelle**
- Municipality of Sainte-Anne-de-la-Pocatière
- Parish of Kamouraska
- Parish of Saint-Alexandre
- Parish of Saint-André
- Parish of Saint-Denis-de-Kamouraska
- Parish of Saint-Paschal-de-Kamouraska
- Parish of Sainte-Hélène
- Unorganized territory of Kamouraska

== Lac-des-Deux-Montagnes ==
- Municipality of Argenteuil
- Municipality of Saint-Benoît
- Municipality of Saint-Colomban
- Municipality of Saint-Eustache
- Municipality of Saint-Hermas
- Municipality of Sainte-Scholastique
- Parish of Saint-Augustin
- Parish of Saint-Placide
- Parish of Saint-Raphaël-de-l’Isle-Bizard
- Township of Chatham
- Township of **Gore**
- Township of Grenville
- Township of **Harrington**
- Township of **Wentworth**
- Unorganized territory of Lac-des-Deux-Montagnes

== Leinster ==
- Municipality of L'Assomption
- Municipality of Lachenaie
- Municipality of Saint-Sulpice
- Parish of L’Épiphanie
- Parish of Repentigny
- Parish of Saint-Alexis
- Parish of Saint-Alphonse-de-Liguori
- Parish of Saint-Henri-de-Mascouche
- Parish of Saint-Jacques
- Parish of Saint-Lin-de-Lachenaye
- Parish of Saint-Ours-du-Saint-Esprit
- Parish of Saint-Roch
- Parish of Sainte-Julienne-de-Rawdon
- Township of Kilkenny
- Township of Rawdon
- Unorganized territory of Leinster

== L'Islet ==
- Municipality of **Cap-Saint-Ignace**
- Municipality of Islet
- Municipality of Port-Joli
- Municipality of Saint-Cyrille
- Municipality of Saint-Pierre-de-la-Rivière-du-Sud
- Municipality of Saint-Roch-des-Aulnets
- Parish of Saint-Thomas
- Unorganized territory of L'Islet

== Lotbinière ==
- Municipality of Lotbinière
- Parish of Saint-Antoine-de-Tilly
- Parish of Saint-Apollinaire
- Parish of Saint-Flavien
- Parish of Saint-Gilles
- Parish of Saint-Jean-Deschaillons
- Parish of Saint-Sylvestre-de-Beaurivage
- Parish of Sainte-Croix
- Unorganized territory of Lotbinière

== Mégantic ==
- Municipality of Broughton
- Municipality of Inverness
- Municipality of Lambton
- Municipality of Sainte-Julie-de-Somerset
- Parish of Saint-Calixte-de-Somerset
- Township of Aylmer
- Township of Forsyth
- Township of Halifax
- Township of Ireland
- Township of Leeds
- Township of Nelson
- Township of Tring
- Township of Wolfestown
- Unorganized territory of Mégantic

== Missisquoi ==
- Parish of Saint-Armand-Est
- Parish of Saint-Armand-Ouest
- Township of Dunham
- Township of Stanbridge
- Township of Sutton
- Unorganized territory of Missisquoi

== Montmagny ==
- Parish of Isle-aux-Grues
- Unorganized territory of Montmagny

== Montmorenci ==
- Municipality of Féréol
- Parish of Ange-Gardien
- Parish of Château-Richer
- Parish of Saint-François
- Parish of Saint-Jean
- Parish of **Saint-Joachim**
- Parish of Saint-Laurent
- Parish of Saint-Pierre
- Parish of Sainte-Anne-Côte-Beaupré
- Parish of Sainte-Famille
- Unorganized territory of Montmorenci

== Montréal ==
- Municipality of Bout-de-l'Isle
- Municipality of Pointe-Claire
- Municipality of Rivière-des-Prairies
- Parish of La Visitation-du-Sault-au-Récollet
- Parish of Lachine
- Parish of Longue-Pointe
- Parish of Montreal
- Parish of Pointe-aux-Trembles
- Parish of Saint-Laurent
- Parish of Sainte-Geneviève

== Nicolet ==
- Parish of Bécancour
- Parish of Saint-Édouard-de-Gentilly
- Parish of Saint-Grégoire-le-Grand
- Parish of Saint-Jean-Baptiste-de-Nicolet
- Parish of Saint-Pierre-les-Becquets
- Parish of Sainte-Gertrude
- Parish of Sainte-Monique
- Unorganized territory of Nicolet

== Ottawa ==
- Municipality of Buckingham
- Municipality of La Petite-Nation
- Municipality of Saint-André-Avellin
- Township of Bristol
- Township of **Chichester**
- Township of Clarendon
- Township of Eardley
- Township of Grand-Calumet
- Township of Hull
- Township of Île-Alumettes
- Township of Litchfield
- Township of **Lochaber**
- Township of Mansfield
- Township of Masham
- Township of Onslow
- Township of Sheen
- Township of Templeton
- Township of Wakefield
- Unorganized territory of Ottawa

== Portneuf ==
- Municipality of Cap-Santé
- Municipality of Deschambault
- Municipality of Grondines
- Municipality of Pointe-aux-Trembles
- Municipality of Saint-Bazile
- Parish of Saint-Augustin
- Parish of Saint-Casimir
- Parish of Saint-Jean-Baptiste-des-Écureuils
- Parish of Saint-Raymond-Nonnat
- Parish of Sainte-Catherine
- Unorganized territory of Portneuf

== Québec ==
- Municipality of Beauport
- Municipality of Stoneham
- Municipality of Valcartier
- Parish of Ancienne-Lorette
- Parish of Charlesbourg
- Parish of **Notre-Dame-des-Anges**
- Parish of Québec
- Parish of Saint-Ambroise
- Parish of Saint-Dunstan-du-Lac-de-Beauport
- Parish of Saint-Foye
- Parish of Saint-Roch
- Unorganized territory of Québec

== Richelieu ==
- Municipality of Saint-Ours
- Municipality of Sorel
- Parish of Saint-Aimé
- Parish of Saint-Barnabé
- Parish of Saint-Charles
- Parish of Saint-Denis
- Parish of Saint-Jude
- Parish of Saint-Marcel
- Parish of Sainte-Victoire
- Unorganized territory of Richelieu

== Rimouski ==
- Municipality of Isle-Verte
- Municipality of Kakonna
- Municipality of Matane
- Municipality of Métis
- Municipality of Rivière-du-Loup
- Municipality of Saint-Simon-de-la-Baie-Ha! Ha!
- Municipality of Trois-Pistoles
- Municipality of Viger
- Parish of **Saint-Arsène**
- Parish of **Saint-Éloi**
- Parish of **Saint-Fabien**
- Parish of Saint-Germain-de-Rimouski
- Parish of Sainte-Cécile-du-Bic
- Parish of **Sainte-Flavie**
- Parish of Sainte-Luce
- Township of Whitworth
- Unorganized territory of Rimouski

== Rouville ==
- Municipality of Saint-Jean-Baptiste
- Parish of Saint-Alexandre
- Parish of Saint-Athanase
- Parish of Saint-Georges
- Parish of Saint-Georges-de-Clarenceville
- Parish of Saint-Grégoire-le-Grand
- Parish of Saint-Hilaire
- Parish of Saint-Mathias
- Parish of Saint-Thomas-de-Foucault
- Parish of Sainte-Brigide-de-Monnoir
- Parish of Sainte-Marie-de-Monnoir
- Unorganized territory of Rouville

== Saguenay ==
- Municipality of Bagot
- Municipality of Chicoutimi
- Parish of Baie-Saint-Paul
- Parish of L’Assomption-de-la-Sainte-Vierge
- Parish of Petite-Rivière
- Parish of Saint-Etienne-de-Murray-Bay
- Parish of Saint-Irénée
- Parish of Saint-Louis-de-l’Isle-aux-Coudres
- Parish of **Saint-Urbain**
- Parish of Sainte-Agnès
- Township of Settrington
- Township of Tremblay
- Unorganized territory of Saguenay

== Saint-Hyacinthe ==
- Municipality of Abbotsford
- Municipality of Saint-Césaire
- Municipality of Saint-Simon
- Parish of La Présentation
- Parish of Saint-Ange-Gardien
- Parish of Saint-Damase
- Parish of Saint-Dominique
- Parish of Saint-Hugues
- Parish of Saint-Hyacinthe
- Parish of Saint-Pie
- Parish of Sainte-Hélène
- Parish of Sainte-Rosalie
- Unorganized territory of Saint-Hyacinthe

== Saint-Maurice ==
- Municipality of Maskinongé
- Municipality of Pointe-du-Lac
- Municipality of Rivière-du-Loup-en-Haut
- Municipality of Yamachiche
- Parish of **Saint-Barnabé**
- Parish of **Saint-Léon-le-Grand**
- Parish of Saint-Paulin
- Parish of Sainte-Ursule
- Parish of Trois-Rivières
- Township of Caxton
- Township of Shawenegan
- Unorganized territory of Saint-Maurice

== Shefford ==
- Municipality of North-Stukely
- Municipality of South-Stukely
- Township of Brome
- Township of Ely
- Township of Farnham-Est
- Township of Farnham-Ouest
- Township of Granby
- Township of Milton
- Township of **Roxton**
- Township of **Shefford**
- Unorganized territory of Shefford

== Sherbrooke ==
- Municipality of **Bury**
- Municipality of Dudswell
- Municipality of Eaton
- Township of Ascot
- Township of Brompton
- Township of **Cleveland**
- Township of Clifton
- Township of Compton
- Township of Hereford
- Township of **Lingwick**
- Township of **Melbourne**
- Township of **Orford**
- Township of Shipton
- Township of Stoke
- Township of Weedon
- Township of Windsor
- Township of Winslow
- United Townships of Newport-Ditton-Chesham-Clinton-et-Aukland
- Unorganized territory of Sherbrooke

== Stanstead ==
- Township of Barford
- Township of Barnston
- Township of Bolton
- Township of **Hatley**
- Township of Magog
- Township of **Potton**
- Township of **Stanstead**
- Unorganized territory of Stanstead

== Terrebonne ==
- Municipality of Lacorne
- Municipality of **Mille-Isles**
- Municipality of Saint-François-de-Sales-Isle-Jésus
- Municipality of Saint-Jérôme
- Municipality of Saint-Vincent-de-Paul
- Municipality of Terrebonne
- Parish of Saint-Janvier-de-Blainville
- Parish of Saint-Martin
- Parish of Sainte-Adèle
- Parish of Sainte-Anne-des-Plaines
- Parish of Sainte-Rose-de-Lima
- Parish of Sainte-Thérèse-de-Blainville
- Township of Abercrombie
- Township of Morin
- Unorganized territory of Terrebonne

== Vaudreuil ==
- Municipality of Newton
- Municipality of Nouvelle-Longueuil
- Municipality of Rigaud
- Municipality of Sainte-Marthe
- Municipality of Vaudreuil
- Parish of Saint-Clet
- Parish of Saint-Ignace-du-Coteau-du-Lac
- Parish of Saint-Joseph-de-Soulanges
- Parish of Saint-Zotique
- Parish of Sainte-Jeanne-de-l’Isle-Perrot
- Unorganized territory of Vaudreuil

== Verchères ==
- Municipality of Contrecoeur
- Municipality of Saint-Antoine
- Municipality of Varennes
- Municipality of Verchères
- Parish of Saint-Marc
- Parish of Saint-Mathieu-de-Beloeil
- Parish of Sainte-Julie
- Unorganized territory of Verchères

== Yamaska ==
- Municipality of Yamaska
- Parish of Saint-Antoine-de-la-Baie-du-Febvre
- Parish of Saint-David
- Parish of Saint-François-du-Lac
- Parish of Saint-Thomas-de-Pierreville
- Parish of **Saint-Zéphirin-de-Courval**
- Unorganized territory of Yamaska

== See also ==
- Pre-20th-century municipal history of Quebec

== External links and sources ==
- Topos sur le Web
- Paroisses et municipalités de la région de Montréal au XIXe siècle, 1825-1861
- Les entités municipales et leurs maires
