= List of municipalities created in Quebec in 1845 =

This is a list of municipalities created in Quebec (Lower Canada) on July 1, 1845.

== County of Beauharnois ==
- Municipality of Dundee
- Municipality of Godmanchester
- Municipality of Ormstown
- Municipality of Russeltown
- Municipality of Saint-Anicet
- Parish of Saint-Clément
- Parish of Saint-Thimothée
- Parish of Sainte-Martine
- Township of Hemmingford
- Township of Hinchinbrooke

== County of Bellechasse ==
- Municipality of Saint-François-de-la-Rivière-du-Sud
- Municipality of Standon
- Parish of Beaumont
- Parish of Berthier-en-Bas
- Parish of Saint-Charles-Borromée-Rivière-Boyer
- Parish of Saint-Gervais
- Parish of Saint-Lazare
- Parish of Saint-Michel
- Parish of Saint-Vallier

== County of Berthier ==
- Municipality of Berthier-en-Haut
- Municipality of Brandon
- Municipality of Kildare
- Municipality of Saint-Cuthbert
- Municipality of Saint-Félix-de-Valois
- Municipality of Saint-Thomas-de-North-Jersey
- Municipality of Sainte-Elizabeth
- Municipality of Sainte-Mélanie
- Parish of L'Isle-du-Pads
- Parish of Lanoraie
- Parish of Lavaltrie
- Parish of Saint-Barthélemi-de-Dusablé
- Parish of Saint-Paul-de-Lavaltrie
- Parish of Village-d'Industrie

== County of Bonaventure ==
- Municipality of Matapédia
- Municipality of Shoolbred
- Township of Carleton
- Township of Cox
- Township of Hamilton
- Township of Hope
- Township of Mann
- Township of Maria
- Township of New Richmond
- Township of Port-Daniel

== County of Chambly ==
- Municipality of Chambly
- Municipality of Saint-Jean
- Parish of Blairfindie
- Parish of Boucherville
- Parish of Longueuil
- Parish of Saint-Bruno-de-Montarville
- Parish of Saint-Luc

== County of Champlain ==
- Parish of Batiscan
- Parish of Cap-de-la-Magdeleine
- Parish of Champlain
- Parish of Saint-Maurice
- Parish of Saint-Stanislas
- Parish of Sainte-Anne-de-la-Pérade
- Parish of Sainte-Geneviève-de-Batiscan

== County of Dorchester ==
- Municipality of Aubert-Gallion
- Municipality of Metschermet
- Municipality of Saint-Bernard
- Municipality of Saint-Elzéar
- Municipality of Saint-François-de-la-Beauce
- Municipality of Saint-Isidore
- Municipality of Sainte-Marie-de-la-Beauce
- Parish of Pointe-Lévi
- Parish of Saint-Anselme
- Parish of Saint-Henri-de-Lauzon
- Parish of Saint-Jean-Chrysostôme
- Parish of Saint-Joseph-de-la-Beauce
- Parish of Saint-Nicolas
- Parish of Sainte-Claire-de-Joliette
- Parish of Sainte-Marguerite-de-Joliette
- Township of Cranbourne
- Township of Frampton

== County of Drummond ==
- Municipality of Arthabaska
- Municipality of Aston
- Municipality of Blandford
- Municipality of Durham
- Municipality of Grantham
- Municipality of Kingsey
- Municipality of Tingwick
- Municipality of Upton
- Township of Stanfold
- Township of Wickham

== County of Gaspé ==
- Municipality of Baie-de-Gaspé
- Municipality of Cap-Chat
- Municipality of Cap-Rosier
- Municipality of Grande-Rivière
- Municipality of Isles-de-la-Magdelaine
- Municipality of Newport
- Township of Douglas
- Township of Malbay
- Township of Percé

== County of Huntingdon ==
- Municipality of Caughnawaga
- Municipality of Chateauguay
- Municipality of Lacolle
- Municipality of Laprairie
- Municipality of Saint-Édouard
- Municipality of Saint-Jacques-le-Mineur
- Parish of Saint-Constant
- Parish of Saint-Cyprien
- Parish of Saint-Isidore
- Parish of Saint-Philippe
- Parish of Saint-Rémi
- Parish of Saint-Valentin
- Parish of Sainte-Philomène

== County of Kamouraska ==
- Municipality of Rivière-Ouelle
- Municipality of Saint-André
- Municipality of Saint-Denis-de-la-Bouteillerie
- Municipality of Saint-Paschal-de-Kamouraska
- Municipality of Sainte-Anne-de-la-Pocatière
- Parish of Kamouraska

== County of Leinster ==
- Municipality of L'Assomption
- Municipality of Lachenaie
- Municipality of Saint-Lin
- Municipality of Saint-Sulpice
- Parish of Mascouche
- Parish of Repentigny
- Parish of Saint-Esprit
- Parish of Saint-Jacques-de-Saint-Sulpice
- Parish of Saint-Roch-de-l'Achigan
- Township of Rawdon

== County of L'Islet ==
- Municipality of Cap-Saint-Ignace
- Municipality of Islet
- Municipality of Port-Joli
- Municipality of Saint-Cyrille
- Municipality of Saint-Pierre-de-la-Rivière-du-Sud
- Municipality of Saint-Roch-des-Aulnets
- Parish of Isle-aux-Grues
- Parish of Saint-Thomas

== County of Lac des Deux-Montagnes ==
- Municipality of Argenteuil
- Municipality of Gore
- Municipality of Grenville
- Municipality of Saint-Benoît
- Municipality of Saint-Colomban
- Municipality of Saint-Eustache
- Municipality of Saint-Hermas
- Municipality of Sainte-Scholastique
- Parish of Saint-Augustin
- Parish of Saint-Raphaël
- Township of Chatham

== County of Lotbinière ==
- Municipality of Deschaillons
- Municipality of Lotbinière
- Municipality of Saint-Gilles
- Parish of Saint-Antoine-de-Tilly
- Parish of Saint-Flavien-de-Sainte-Croix
- Parish of Saint-Sylvestre-de-Beaurivage
- Parish of Sainte-Croix

== County of Mégantic ==
- Municipality of Broughton
- Municipality of Inverness
- Municipality of Ireland
- Municipality of Somerset
- Municipality of Tring
- Township of Halifax
- Township of Leeds

== County of Missisquoi ==
- Municipality of Frelighsburg
- Municipality of Philipsburg
- Township of Dunham
- Township of Stanbridge
- Township of Sutton

== County of Montmorenci ==
- Municipality of Féréol
- Parish of Ange-Gardien
- Parish of Château-Richer
- Parish of Saint-François
- Parish of Saint-Jean
- Parish of Saint-Joachim
- Parish of Saint-Laurent
- Parish of Saint-Pierre
- Parish of Sainte-Anne-Côte-Beaupré
- Parish of Sainte-Famille

== County of Montréal ==
- Municipality of Bout-de-l’Isle
- Municipality of Hochelaga
- Municipality of Pointe-Claire
- Municipality of Rivière-des-Prairies
- Municipality of Sault-au-Récollet
- Parish of Lachine
- Parish of Longue-Pointe
- Parish of Pointe-aux-Trembles
- Parish of Saint-Laurent
- Parish of Sainte-Geneviève

== County of Nicolet ==
- Parish of Bécancour
- Parish of Gentilly
- Parish of Nicolet
- Parish of Saint-Grégoire-le-Grand
- Parish of Saint-Pierre-les-Becquets
- Parish of Sainte-Monique

== County of Ottawa ==
- Municipality of Buckingham
- Municipality of Clarendon
- Municipality of La Petite-Nation
- Municipality of Lochaber
- Municipality of Onslow
- Township of Bristol
- Township of Hull
- Township of Templeton
- Township of Wakefield

== County of Portneuf ==
- Municipality of Cap-Santé
- Municipality of Deschambault
- Municipality of Grondines
- Municipality of Pointe-aux-Trembles
- Municipality of Saint-Bazile
- Municipality of Saint-Casimir
- Municipality of Saint-Raymond
- Parish of Écureuils
- Parish of Saint-Augustin
- Parish of Sainte-Catherine

== County of Québec ==
- Municipality of Beauport
- Municipality of Saint-Dunstan
- Municipality of Saint-Roch
- Municipality of Stadacona
- Municipality of Stoneham
- Municipality of Valcartier
- Parish of Ancienne-Lorette
- Parish of Charlesbourg
- Parish of Saint-Ambroise
- Parish of Saint-Foye

== County of Richelieu ==
- Municipality of Saint-Ours
- Municipality of Sorel
- Parish of Saint-Aimé
- Parish of Saint-Barnabé
- Parish of Saint-Charles
- Parish of Saint-Denis
- Parish of Saint-Jude
- Parish of Sainte-Victoire

== County of Rimouski ==
- Municipality of Bic
- Municipality of Isle-Verte
- Municipality of Kakonna
- Municipality of Lepage
- Municipality of Lessard
- Municipality of Matane
- Municipality of Métis
- Municipality of Rimouski
- Municipality of Rivière-du-Loup
- Municipality of Saint-Simon-de-la-Baie-Ha! Ha!
- Municipality of Trois-Pistoles

== County of Rouville ==
- Municipality of Clarenceville
- Municipality of Foucault
- Municipality of Henryville
- Municipality of Rouville
- Municipality of Saint-Grégoire-le-Grand-de-Monnoir
- Municipality of Saint-Jean-Baptiste
- Parish of Saint-Athanase
- Parish of Saint-Mathias
- Parish of Sainte-Marie-de-Monnoir

== County of Saguenay ==
- Municipality of Bagot
- Municipality of Chicoutimi
- Municipality of Malbaie
- Municipality of Saint-Irénée
- Municipality of Saint-Urbain
- Municipality of Tadoussac
- Parish of Baie-Saint-Paul
- Parish of Eboulemens
- Parish of Isle-aux-Coudres
- Parish of Petite-Rivière
- Parish of Sainte-Agnès

== County of Saint-Hyacinthe ==
- Municipality of Abbotsford
- Municipality of Saint-Césaire
- Municipality of Saint-Dominique
- Municipality of Saint-Simon
- Parish of La Présentation
- Parish of Saint-Damase
- Parish of Saint-Hugues
- Parish of Saint-Hyacinthe
- Parish of Saint-Pie
- Parish of Sainte-Rosalie

== County of Saint-Maurice ==
- Municipality of Dumontier
- Municipality of Gatineau
- Municipality of Maskinongé
- Municipality of Pointe-du-Lac
- Municipality of Rivière-du-Loup-en-Haut
- Municipality of Trois-Rivières
- Municipality of Yamachiche
- Parish of Sainte-Ursule

== County of Shefford ==
- Municipality of Ely
- Township of Brome
- Township of Farnham
- Township of Granby
- Township of Milton
- Township of Shefford
- Township of Stukely

== County of Sherbrooke ==
- Municipality of Ascot
- Municipality of Brompton
- Municipality of Bury
- Municipality of Compton
- Municipality of Dudswell
- Municipality of Eaton
- Municipality of Hereford
- Municipality of Melbourne
- Municipality of Windsor
- Township of Shipton

== County of Stanstead ==
- Municipality of Barnston
- Township of Bolton
- Township of Hatley
- Township of Potton
- Township of Stanstead

== County of Terrebonne ==
- Municipality of Lacorne
- Municipality of Saint-François-de-Sales
- Municipality of Saint-Jérôme
- Municipality of Saint-Vincent-de-Paul
- Municipality of Terrebonne
- Parish of Saint-Martin
- Parish of Sainte-Anne-des-Plaines
- Parish of Sainte-Rose
- Parish of Sainte-Thérèse

== County of Vaudreuil ==
- Municipality of Coteau-du-Lac
- Municipality of L'Isle-Perrot
- Municipality of Newton
- Municipality of Nouvelle-Longueuil
- Municipality of Rigaud
- Municipality of Soulanges
- Municipality of Vaudreuil

== County of Verchères ==
- Municipality of Contrecoeur
- Municipality of Saint-Antoine
- Municipality of Varennes
- Municipality of Verchères
- Parish of Beloeil
- Parish of Saint-Marc

== County of Yamaska ==
- Municipality of Yamaska
- Parish of Saint-Antoine-de-la-Baie-du-Febvre
- Parish of Saint-David
- Parish of Saint-François-du-Lac
- Parish of Saint-Zéphirin-de-Courval

== See also ==
- Pre-20th-century municipal history of Quebec
