= Kingsey (disambiguation) =

Kingsey may refer to these places:

- Kingsey, a village in England
- Saint-Félix-de-Kingsey, Quebec, earlier known simply as "Kingsey"
- Kingsey Falls, Quebec
