= Municipal districts of Quebec =

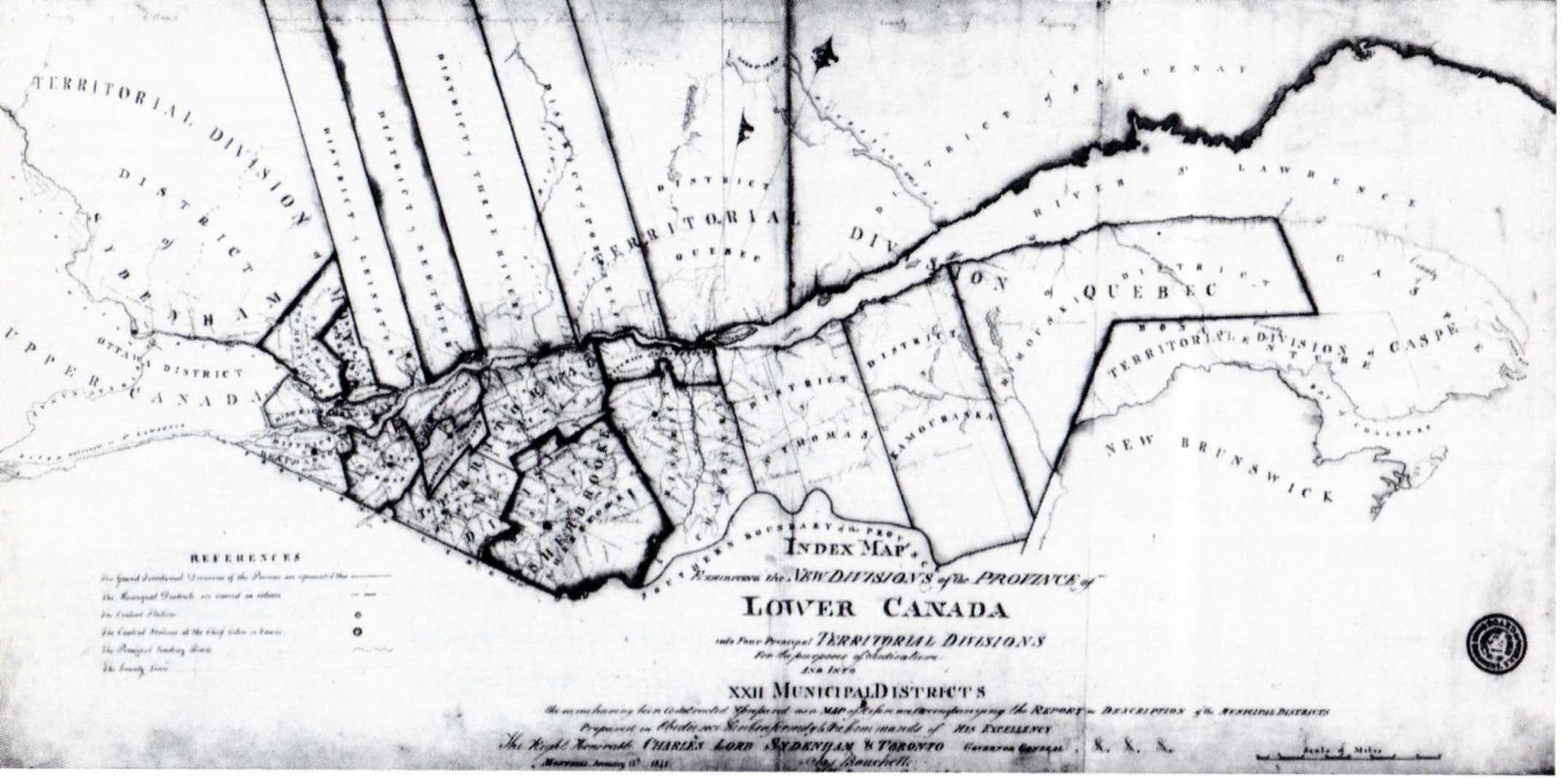
Map of the municipal districts in Lower Canada in 1841

These are the Municipal districts created in Quebec on 15 April, 1841, from a proclamation of governor Sydenham. They were replaced by parish and township municipalities in 1845.

== Districts ==
- Municipal district of Beauharnois.
- Municipal district of Berthier.
- Municipal district of Bonaventure.
- Municipal district of Chaudière.
- Municipal district of Dorchester.
- Municipal district of Gaspé.
- Municipal district of Kamouraska.
- Municipal district of Lac-des-Deux-Montagnes.
- Municipal district of Leinster.
- Municipal district of Missisquoi.
- Municipal district of Montréal.
- Municipal district of Nicolet.
- Municipal district of Portneuf.
- Municipal district of Quebec.
- Municipal district of Richelieu.
- Municipal district of Rimouski.
- Municipal district of Saguenay.
- Municipal district of Saint-Hyacinthe.
- Municipal district of Saint-Jean.
- Municipal district of Saint-Thomas.
- Municipal district of Sherbrooke.
- Municipal district of Sydenham.
- Municipal district of Terrebonne.
- Municipal district of Trois-Rivières.
