= Saint-Épiphane =

- Municipality
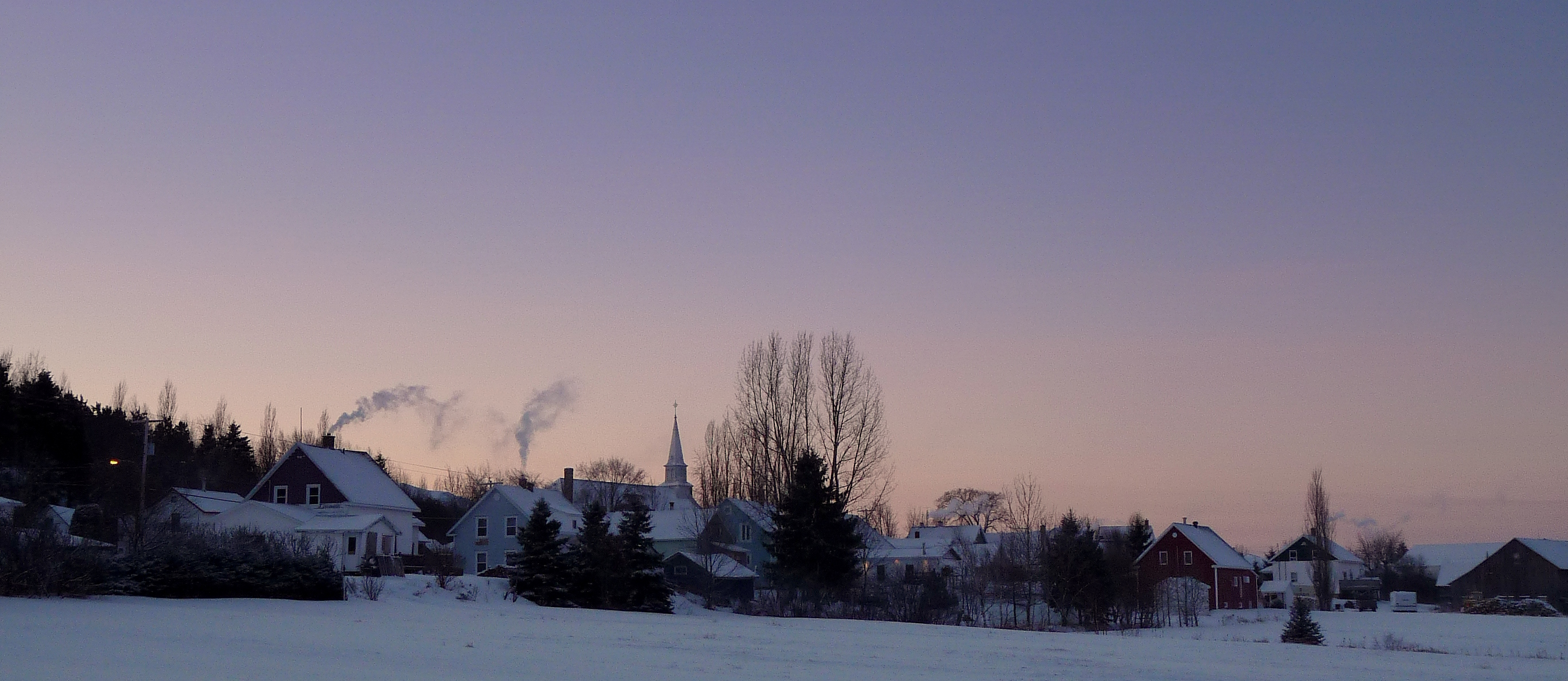
- Village of Saint-Épiphane

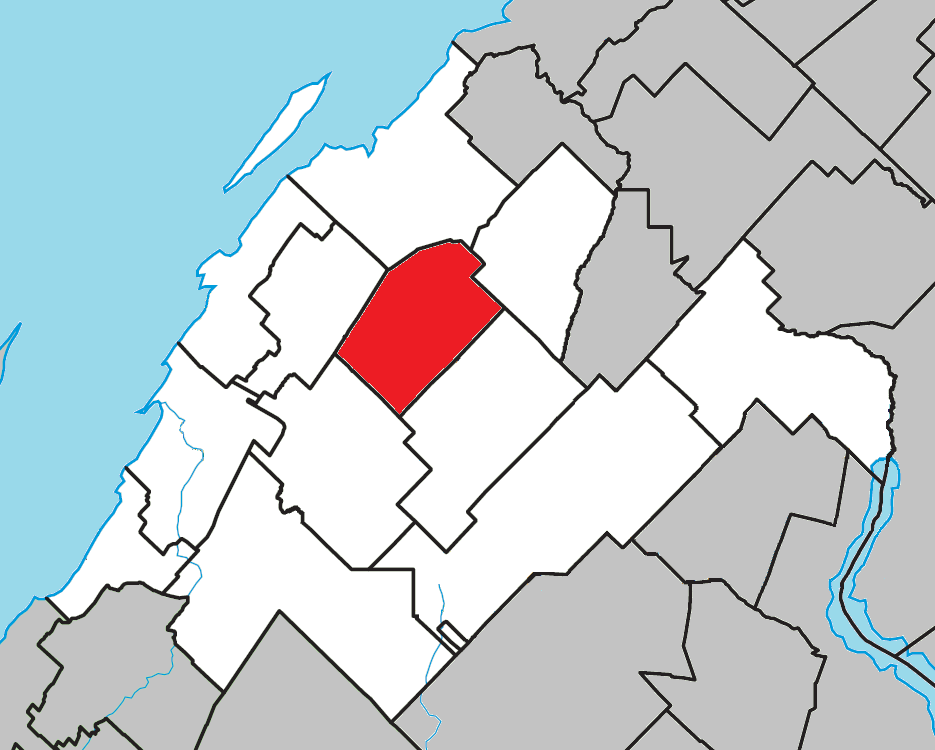
- Location within Rivière-du-Loup RCM.

- Location in eastern Quebec.
- Coordinates: 47°54′N 69°20′W
- Country: Canada
- Province: Quebec
- Region: Bas-Saint-Laurent
- RCM: Rivière-du-Loup
- Constituted: July 1, 1855

Government
  - Mayor: Rachelle Caron
  - Federal riding: Côte-du-Sud—Rivière-du-Loup—Kataskomiq—Témiscouata
  - Prov. riding: Rivière-du-Loup–Témiscouata–Les Basques

Area
  - Total: 82.20 km^{2} (31.74 sq mi)
  - Land: 82.85 km^{2} (31.99 sq mi)

Population (2021)
  - Total: 836
  - Density: 10.1/km^{2} (26/sq mi)
  - Pop 2016-2021: ▲1.1%
  - Dwellings: 390
- Time zone: UTC−5 (EST)
  - Summer (DST): UTC−4 (EDT)
- Postal code(s): G0L 2X0
- Area codes: 418 and 581
- Highways: R-291
- Website: www.saint-epiphane.ca

Saint-Épiphane (French pronunciation: [sɛ̃t‿epifan]) is a municipality in Quebec in the administrative region of Bas-Saint-Laurent and the regional county municipality of Rivière-du-Loup.

== History ==
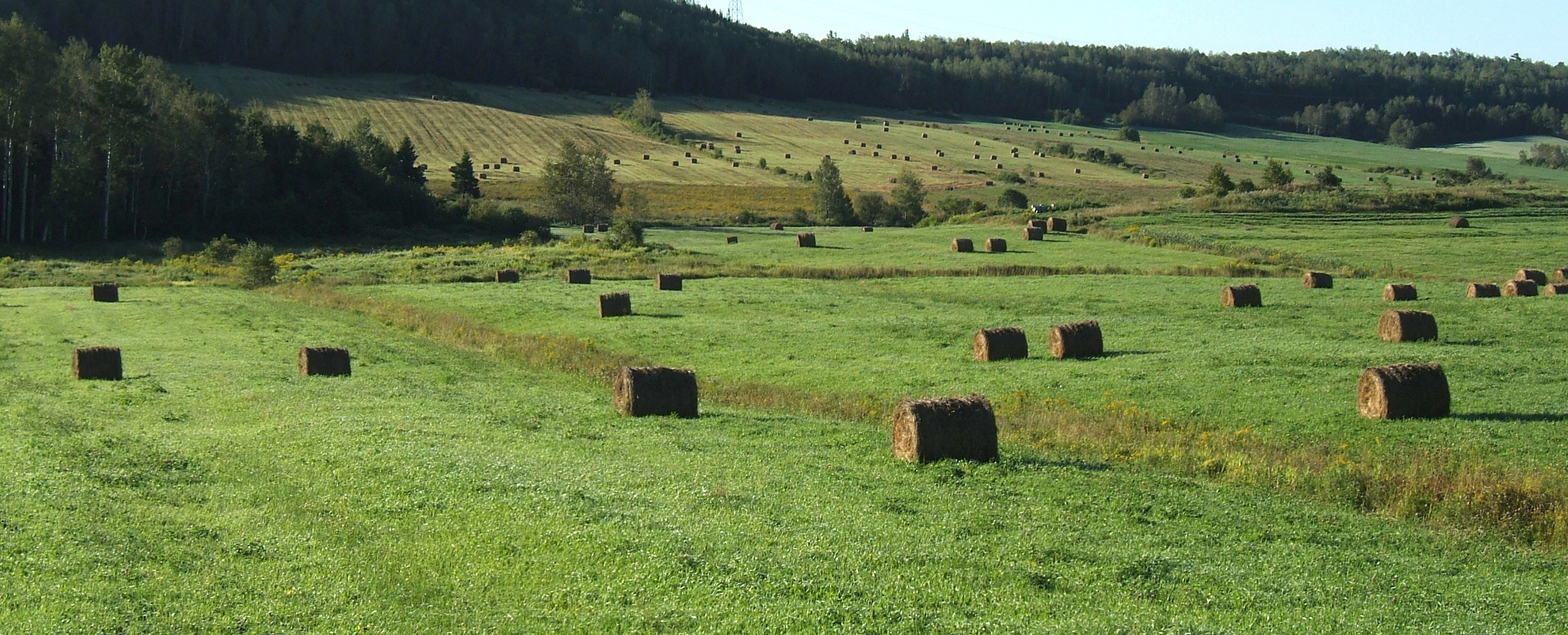
A farm in Saint-Épiphane

It was in 1840 that the first settlers, most of whom came from Rivière-du-Loup, Saint-Arsène and Isle-Verte, settled on the territory of the future municipality. As early as 1842, a mission provided religious assistance to the few inhabitants, who founded a parish under the name of Saint-Épiphane in 1863, canonically erected in 1870.

In 1855, the municipality of Viger was officially created, named after Denis-Benjamin Viger (1774–1861). In 1873, Viger lost a small part of its territory for the creation of the municipality of Saint-François-Xavier (which would be dissolved in 1892). In 1894 Viger would change its name to the current Saint-Épiphane.

In 1950, Saint-Épiphane lost another small part of its territory when Saint-François-Xavier-de-Viger was created. In 1991, Saint-Épiphane updated its status from a parish municipality to become a regular municipality.

In the past, the Wolastoqiyik, Amerindians close to the Mi'kmaq, lived on a reserve near Saint-Épiphane.

== See also ==
- List of municipalities in Quebec
