= Saint-Modeste =

- Municipality
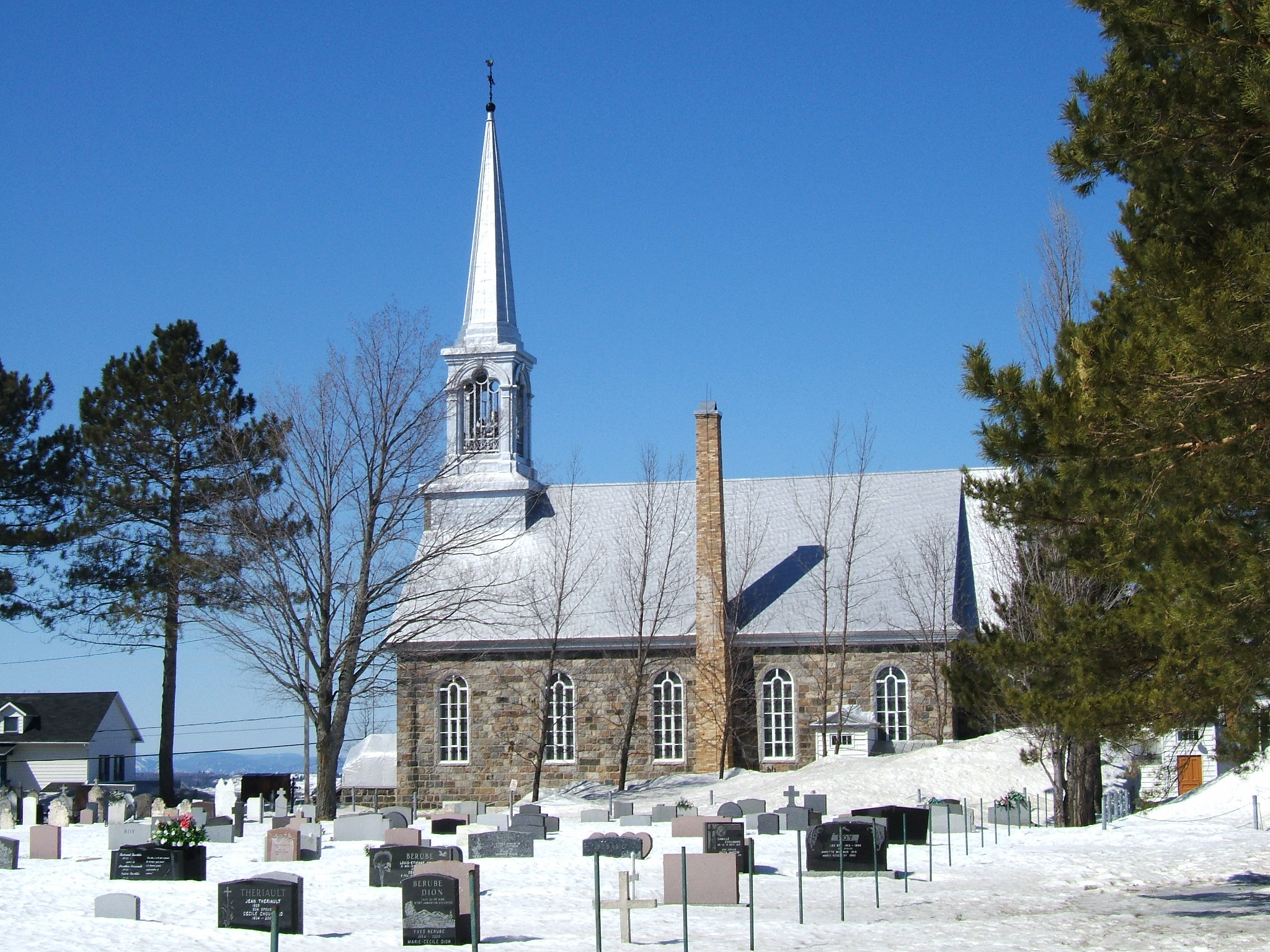
- Church of Saint-Modeste

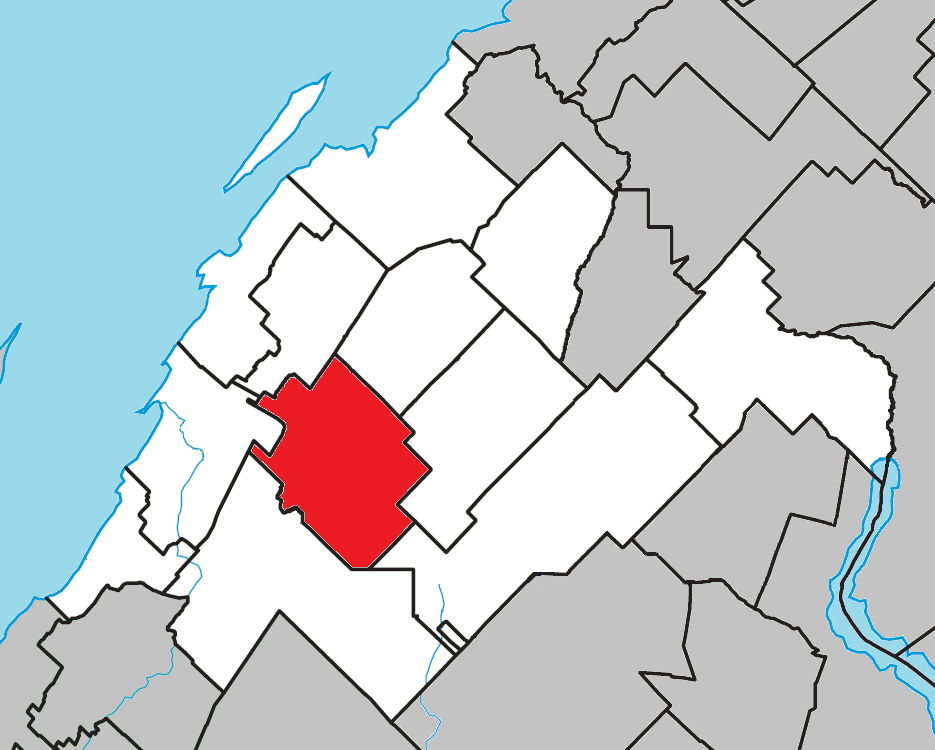
- Location within Rivière-du-Loup RCM

- Location in eastern Quebec
- Coordinates: 47°50′N 69°24′W
- Country: Canada
- Province: Quebec
- Region: Bas-Saint-Laurent
- RCM: Rivière-du-Loup
- Constituted: July 1, 1855

Government
  - Mayor: Louis-Marie Bastille
  - Federal riding: Côte-du-Sud—Rivière-du-Loup—Kataskomiq—Témiscouata
  - Prov. riding: Rivière-du-Loup–Témiscouata–Les Basques

Area
  - Total: 112.10 km^{2} (43.28 sq mi)
  - Land: 109.72 km^{2} (42.36 sq mi)

Population (2021)
  - Total: 1,180
  - Density: 10.8/km^{2} (28/sq mi)
  - Change (2016–21): ▲1.5%
  - Dwellings: 480
- Time zone: UTC−5 (EST)
  - Summer (DST): UTC−4 (EDT)
- Postal code(s): G0L 3W0
- Area codes: 418 and 581
- Highways: No major routes
- Website: www.municipalite.saint-modeste.qc.ca

Saint-Modeste (French pronunciation: [sɛ̃ mɔdɛst]) is a municipality situated in the Rivière-du-Loup Regional County Municipality of Quebec, Canada.

== See also ==
- List of municipalities in Quebec
