= Saint-Félix-de-Kingsey =

- Municipality
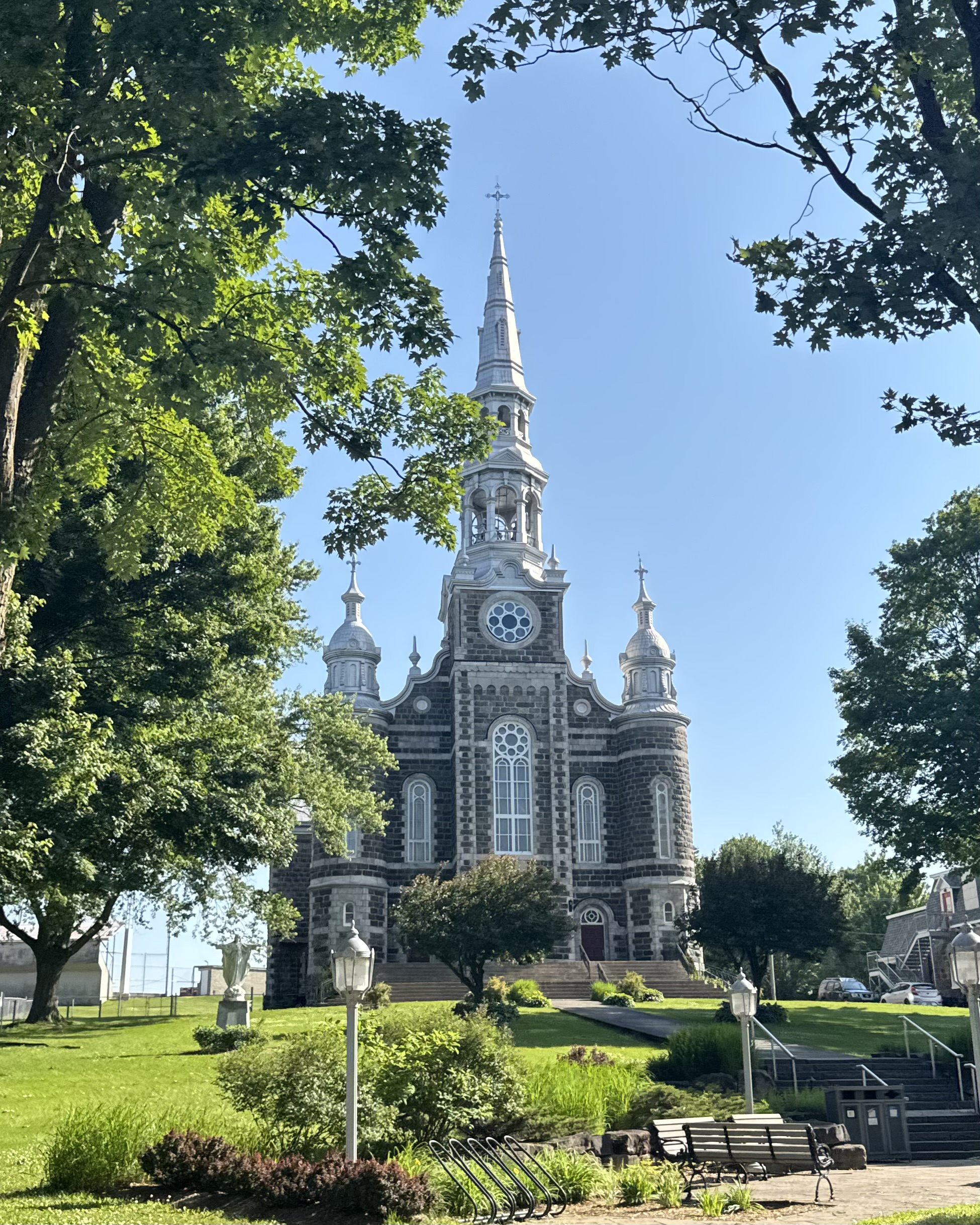

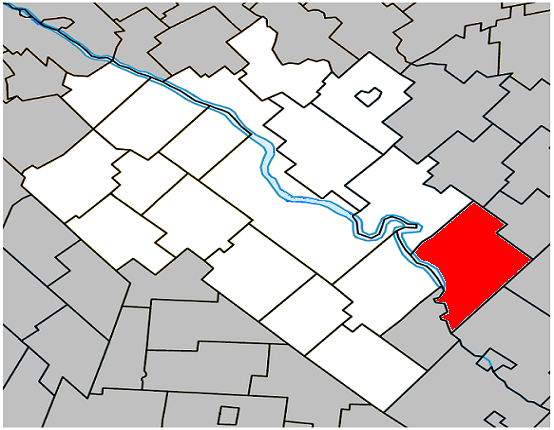
- Location within Drummond RCM.

- Location in southern Quebec.
- Coordinates: 45°48′N 72°11′W
- Country: Canada
- Province: Quebec
- Region: Centre-du-Québec
- RCM: Drummond
- Constituted: July 1, 1855

Government
  - Mayor: Mario Lemire
  - Federal riding: Drummond
  - Prov. riding: Drummond–Bois-Francs

Area
  - Total: 128.00 km^{2} (49.42 sq mi)
  - Land: 126.28 km^{2} (48.76 sq mi)

Population (2021)
  - Total: 1,493
  - Density: 11.8/km^{2} (31/sq mi)
  - Pop 2016-2021: ▲4.4%
  - Dwellings: 744
- Demonym: Kingséen
- Time zone: UTC−5 (EST)
  - Summer (DST): UTC−4 (EDT)
- Postal code(s): J0B 2T0
- Area code: 819
- Highways: R-243; R-255
- Website: www.saintfelixdekingsey.ca

Saint-Félix-de-Kingsey (French pronunciation: [sɛ̃ feliks də kiŋze]) is a Quebec municipality located in the Drummond Regional County Municipality in the Centre-du-Quebec region. The population as of the Canada 2021 Census was 1,493. The municipality was known simply as Kingsey until 1999.

== Demographics ==
=== Population ===
Population trend:

Census	Population	Change (%)
2021	1,493	▲4.4%
2016	1,430	▼8.5%
2011	1,563	▲9.3%
2006	1,430	▼6.0%
2001	1,521	▲5.7%
1996	1,439	▲5.7%
1991	1,362	▼4.4%
1986	1,425	▲2.1%
1981	1,396	▲6.2%
1976	1,315	▲3.4%
1971	1,272	▼10.8%
1966	1,426	▲1.8%
1961	1,401	▲2.9%
1956	1,361	▲0.6%
1951	1,353	▼2.5%
1941	1,387	▲8.5%
1931	1,278	▼11.3%
1921	1,440	▲8.2%
1911	1,331	▼12.5%
1901	1,521	▼1.0%
1891	1,536	▼31.8%
1881	2,251	▲18.0%
1871	1,907	▼20.6%
1861	2,403	N/A

=== Language ===
Mother tongue language (2021)

Language	Population	Pct (%)
French only	1,325	88.6%
English only	115	7.7%
Both English and French	15	1.0%
Other languages	30	2.0%

== See also ==
- List of municipalities in Quebec
- Pre-20th-century municipal history of Quebec
