= Saint-Lazare-de-Bellechasse =

- Municipality
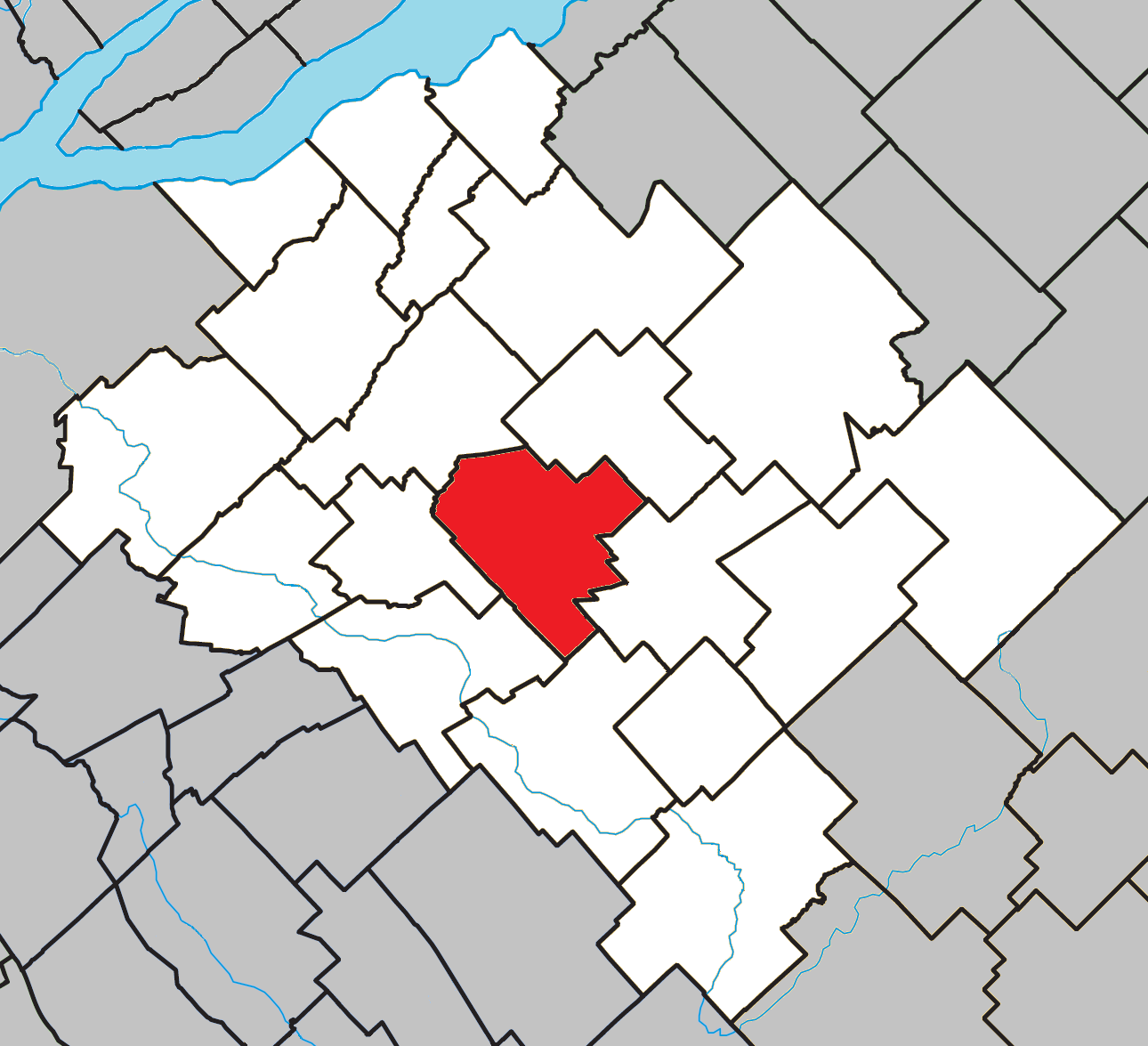
- Location within Bellechasse RCM.

- Location in province of Quebec.
- Coordinates: 46°39′N 70°48′W
- Country: Canada
- Province: Quebec
- Region: Chaudière-Appalaches
- RCM: Bellechasse
- Constituted: July 1, 1855

Government
  - Mayor: Martin J. Côté
  - Federal riding: Bellechasse—Les Etchemins—Lévis
  - Prov. riding: Bellechasse

Area
  - Total: 85.70 km^{2} (33.09 sq mi)
  - Land: 86.35 km^{2} (33.34 sq mi)
- There is an apparent contradiction between two authoritative sources

Population (2011)
  - Total: 1,172
  - Density: 13.6/km^{2} (35/sq mi)
  - Pop 2006-2011: ▲1.5%
  - Dwellings: 522
- Time zone: UTC−5 (EST)
  - Summer (DST): UTC−4 (EDT)
- Postal code(s): G0R 3J0
- Area codes: 418 and 581
- Highways: R-279

Saint-Lazare (French pronunciation: [sɛ̃ lazaʁ də bɛlʃas]) is a small village of 1,200 people founded in 1849 and is the seat of the Bellechasse Regional County Municipality, part of the Chaudière-Appalaches administrative region. It was chosen as the seat over larger municipalities because it is in the geographical centre of the region.
