= Lochaber, Quebec =

Lochaber
- Township municipality
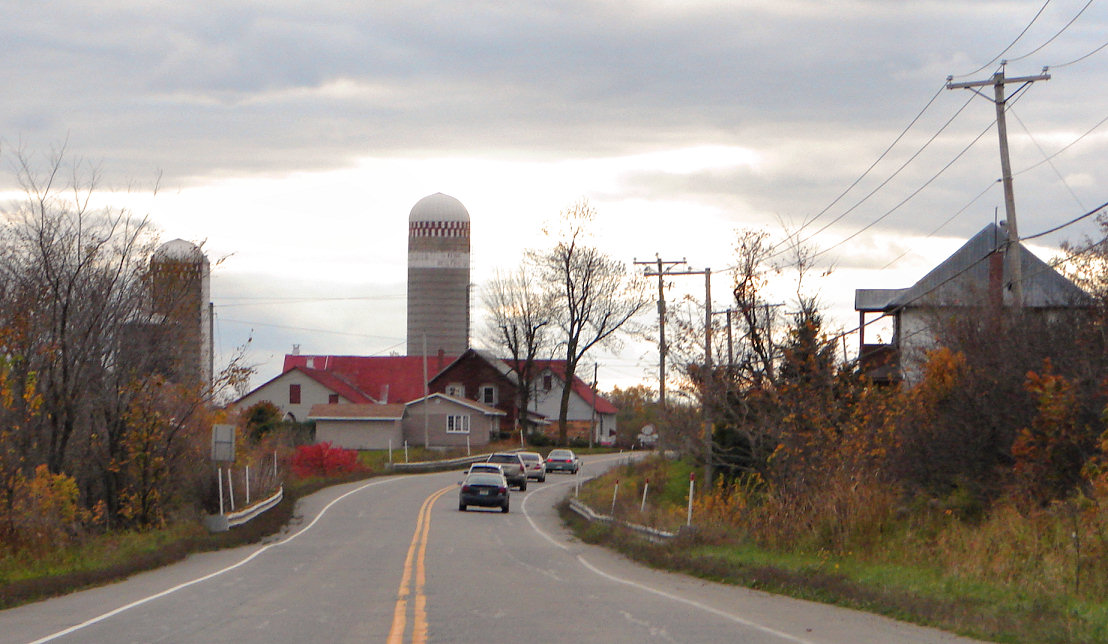

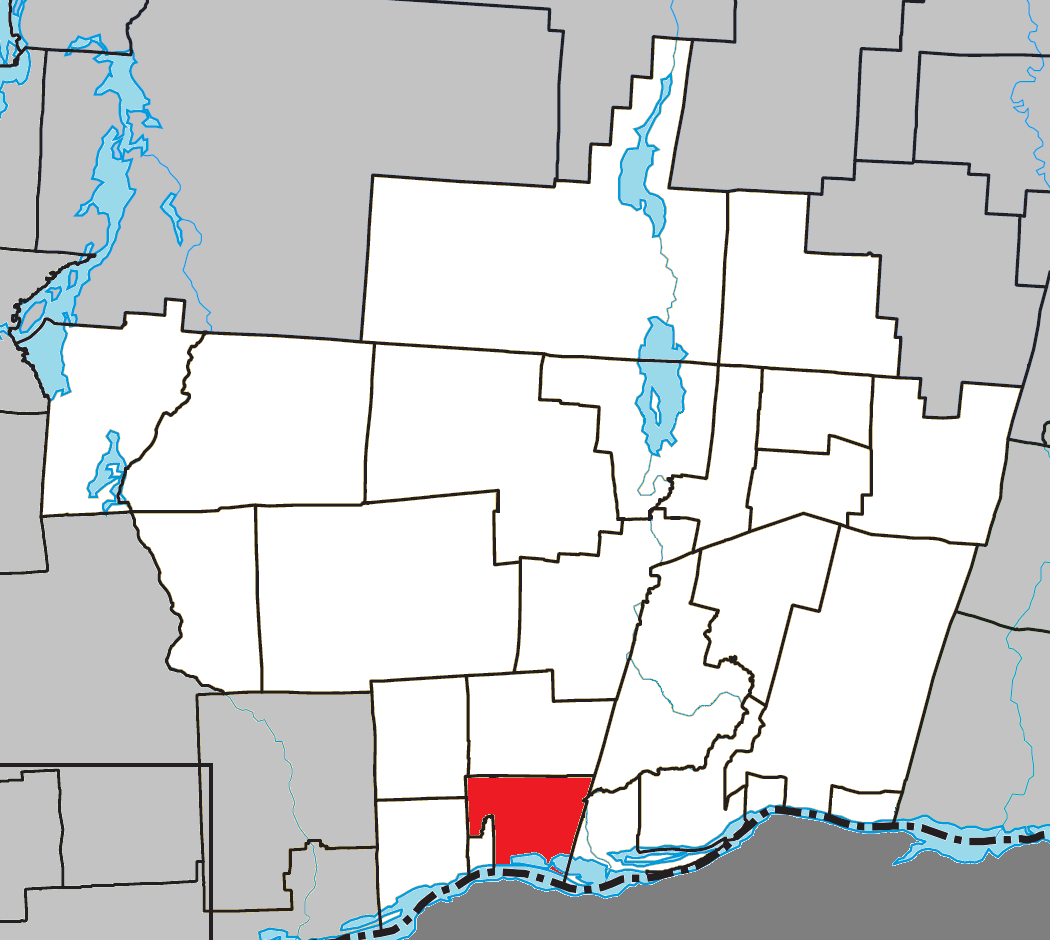
- Location within Papineau RCM

- Location in western Quebec
- Coordinates: 45°38′N 75°13′W
- Country: Canada
- Province: Quebec
- Region: Outaouais
- RCM: Papineau
- Constituted: July 1, 1855

Government
  - Mayor: Georges Leduc
  - Federal riding: Argenteuil—La Petite-Nation
  - Prov. riding: Papineau

Area
  - Total: 70.00 km^{2} (27.03 sq mi)
  - Land: 62.04 km^{2} (23.95 sq mi)

Population (2021)
  - Total: 446
  - Density: 7.2/km^{2} (19/sq mi)
  - Pop 2016-2021: ▲7.5%
  - Dwellings: 194
- Time zone: UTC−5 (EST)
  - Summer (DST): UTC−4 (EDT)
- Postal code(s): J0X 3B0
- Area code: 819
- Highways A-50: R-148; R-317

Lochaber is a township municipality in the Canadian province of Quebec, located within the Papineau Regional County Municipality. The township had a population of 415 in the 2016 Canadian Census.

== History ==
In 1807, a group of Scots settled in the southern part of the Blanche River valley, the same year the geographic township of Lochaber Gore was created. They came from Thurso in Scotland, as well as from the Highlands, near Lochaber and other parts of northern Scotland.

In 1845, the township municipality was formed but abolished in September 1847 when it became part of Ottawa County. In 1855, it was reestablished.

In 1886, the village municipality of Thurso separated from the township, and in 1891, the western half the township was split off to form the township municipality of Lochaber-Partie-Ouest.

== Demographics ==
Historical census populations – Lochaber, Quebec
Year	Pop.	±%
1986	505	—
1991	521	+3.2%
1996	510	−2.1%
2001	456	−10.6%
2006	497	+9.0%
2011	409	−17.7%
2016	415	+1.5%
Source: Statistics Canada

In the 2021 Census of Population conducted by Statistics Canada, Lochaber had a population of 446 living in 176 of its 194 total private dwellings, a change of 7.5% from its 2016 population of 415. With a land area of 62.14 km^{2} (23.99 sq mi), it had a population density of 7.2/km^{2} (18.6/sq mi) in 2021.

Canada census – Lochaber community profile

	2021	2016	2011
Population	446 (+7.5% from 2016)	415 (1.5% from 2011)	409 (-17.7% from 2006)
Land area	62.14 km^{2} (23.99 sq mi)	60.70 km^{2} (23.44 sq mi)	62.04 km^{2} (23.95 sq mi)
Population density	7.2/km^{2} (19/sq mi)	6.8/km^{2} (18/sq mi)	6.6/km^{2} (17/sq mi)
Median age	46.0 (M: 47.6, F: 43.2)	42.0 (M: 44.8, F: 39.5)	42.4 (M: 45.3, F: 38.5)
Private dwellings	194 (total) 176 (occupied)	183 (total)	167 (total)
Median household income	$75,500	$58,880	$32,110

References: 2021 2016 2011

Mother tongue:

- English as first language: 7.2%
- French as first language: 89.2%
- English and French as first language: 0%
- Other as first language: 2.4%
