= Quebec Route 137 =

Highway in Quebec, Canada

Route 137

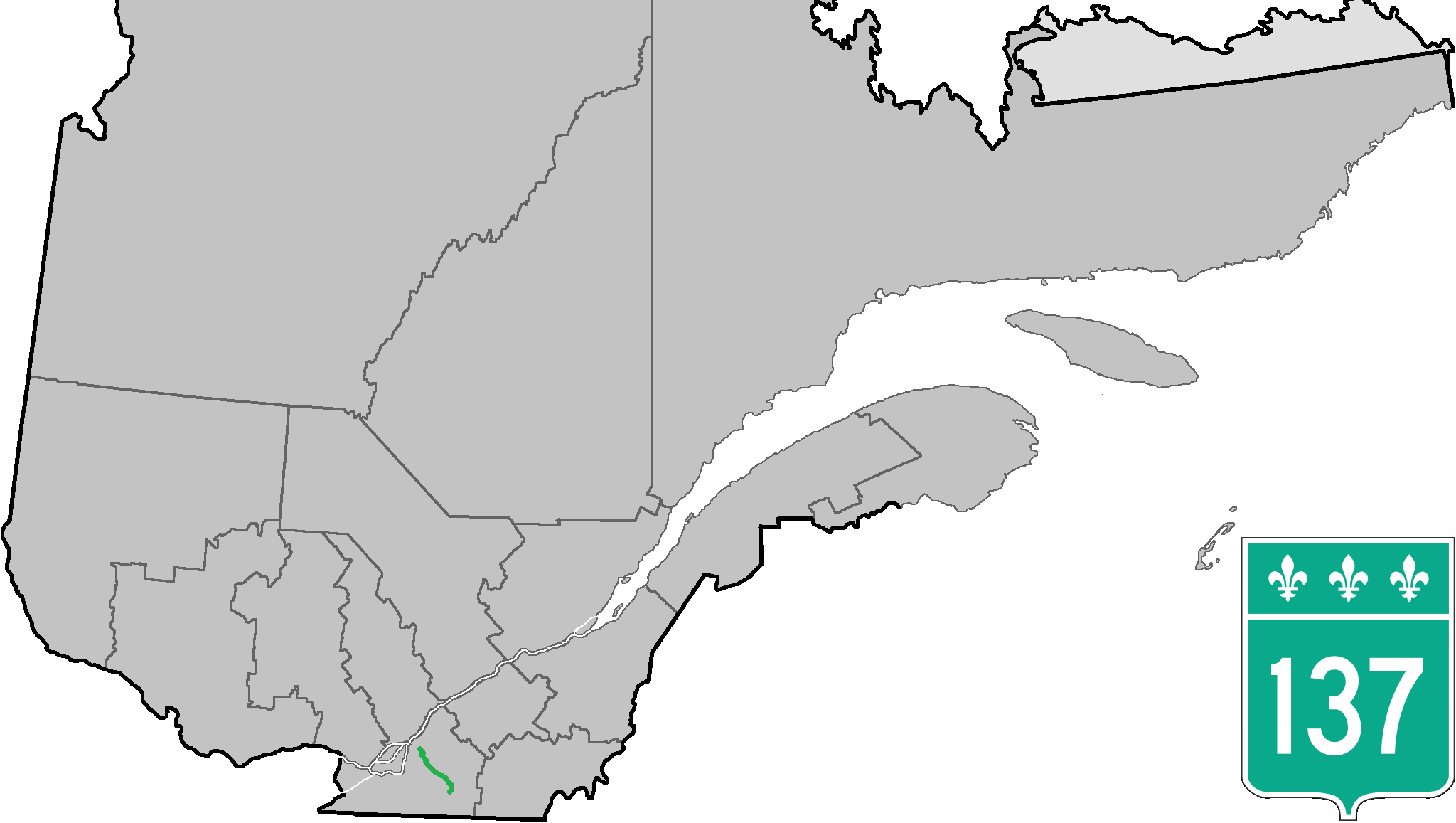

Route information
- Maintained by Transports Québec
- Length: 59.9 km (37.2 mi)

Major junctions
- South end: R-112 in Granby
- R-211 in Sainte-Cecile-de-Milton; A-20 (TCH) / R-116 / R-224 / R-235 in Saint-Hyacinthe
- North end: R-133 in Saint-Denis-sur-Richelieu

Location
- Country: Canada
- Province: Quebec

Highway system
- Quebec provincial highways; Autoroutes; List; Former
← R-136	→ R-138

Route 137 is a north/south highway on the south shore of the Saint Lawrence River in Quebec, Canada. Its northern terminus is in Saint-Denis-sur-Richelieu, at the junction of Route 133, and the southern terminus is in Granby at the junction of Route 112.

== Municipalities along Route 137 ==
- Granby
- Sainte-Cécile-de-Milton
- Saint-Dominique
- Saint-Hyacinthe
- La Presentation
- Saint-Denis-sur-Richelieu

== Major intersections ==
RCM or ET	Municipality	Km	Junction	Notes
Southern terminus of Route 137
La Haute-Yamaska	Granby	0.0	R-112	112 WEST: to Saint-Paul-d'Abbotsford; 112 EAST: to Shefford
La Haute-Yamaska	Sainte-Cecile-de-Milton	8.5	R-211	211 NORTH: to Saint-Valérien-de-Milton
Les Maskoutains	Saint-Hyacinthe	29.1	R-224	224 EAST: to Saint-Simon
Les Maskoutains	Saint-Hyacinthe	30.9; 31.5	R-116 (Overlap 0.6 km)	116 EAST: to Saint-Simon; 116 WEST: to Sainte-Marie-Madeleine
Les Maskoutains	Saint-Hyacinthe	33.5	R-235 (Overlap 1.6 km)	235 SOUTH: to Saint-Pie
Les Maskoutains	Saint-Hyacinthe	33.9; 34.3	A-20 (TCH)	20 EAST: to Saint-Simon; 20 WEST: to La Présentation
Les Maskoutains	Saint-Hyacinthe	35.1	R-235 (Overlap 1.6 km)	235 NORTH: to Saint-Barnabe-Sud
La Vallée-du-Richelieu	Saint-Denis-sur-Richelieu	59.9	R-133	133 SOUTH: to Mont-Saint-Hilaire; 133 NORTH: to Saint-Ours
Northern terminus of Route 137

== See also ==
- List of Quebec provincial highways
