= Saint-Hugues, Quebec =

Saint-Hugues
- Municipality
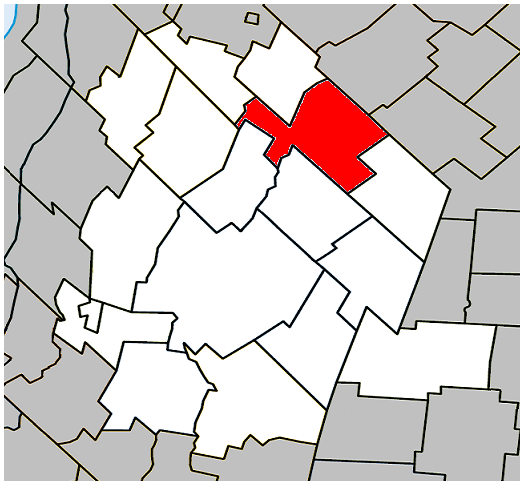
- Location within Les Maskoutains RCM.

- Location in southern Quebec.
- Coordinates: 45°48′N 72°52′W
- Country: Canada
- Province: Quebec
- Region: Montérégie
- RCM: Les Maskoutains
- Founded: 1827
- Constituted: November 6, 1982

Government
  - Mayor: Richard Veilleux
  - Federal riding: Saint-Hyacinthe—Bagot—Acton
  - Prov. riding: Saint-Hyacinthe

Area
  - Total: 85.90 km^{2} (33.17 sq mi)
  - Land: 83.84 km^{2} (32.37 sq mi)

Population (2011)
  - Total: 1,292
  - Density: 15.4/km^{2} (40/sq mi)
  - Pop 2006-2011: ▼1.4%
  - Dwellings: 536
- Time zone: UTC−5 (EST)
  - Summer (DST): UTC−4 (EDT)
- Postal code(s): J0H 1N0
- Area codes: 450 and 579
- Highways: R-224; R-239
- Website: www.saint-hugues.com

Saint-Hugues (/ ... ˈhjuːz/ ... HEWZ, French: [sɛ̃.yɡ]) is a town in southwestern Quebec north northeast of St-Hyacinthe, with a 2006 population of 1,310. It is located along Quebec Route 224, halfway between Saint-Guillaume and Saint-Simon-de-Bagot.

== History ==
In 1827 Saint-Hugues was created as a village, later to be incorporated into the county of Bagot.

== Demographics ==
=== Population ===
Canada census – Saint-Hugues community profile

	2021	2011
Population	1,340 (+1.0% from 2016)	1,292 (-1.4% from 2006)
Land area	84.64 km^{2} (32.68 sq mi)	83.84 km^{2} (32.37 sq mi)
Population density	15.8/km^{2} (41/sq mi)	15.4/km^{2} (40/sq mi)
Median age	39.2 (M: 40, F: 38)	39.6 (M: 39.9, F: 39.5)
Private dwellings	540 (total)	536 (total)
Median household income		$60,864

References: 2021 2011

Historical Census Data - Saint-Hugues, Quebec

Year	Pop.	±%
1991	1,281	—
1996	1,340	+4.6%

Year	Pop.	±%
2001	1,277	−4.7%
2006	1,310	+2.6%

Year	Pop.	±%
2011	1,292	−1.4%

=== Language ===
Canada Census Mother Tongue - Saint-Hugues, Quebec
Census	Total	French			English			French & English			Other		
Year	Responses	Count	Trend	Pop %	Count	Trend	Pop %	Count	Trend	Pop %	Count	Trend	Pop %
2011	1,290	1,270	▲1.2%	98.45%	15	▼40.0%	1.16%	5	▲ n/a%	0.39%	0	▼100.0%	0.00%
2006	1,305	1,255	▼1.6%	96.17%	25	▲ n/a%	1.92%	0	0.0%	0.00%	25	▲ n/a%	1.92%
2001	1,275	1,275	▼5.9%	100.00%	0	0.0%	0.00%	0	0.0%	0.00%	0	▼100.0%	0.00%
1996	1,370	1,355	n/a	98.91%	0	n/a	0.00%	0	n/a	0.00%	15	n/a	1.09%

== See also ==
- List of municipalities in Quebec
- Municipal reorganization in Quebec
