= Quebec Route 116 =

Highway in Quebec

Route 116
- Boulevard Sir Wilfrid-Laurier
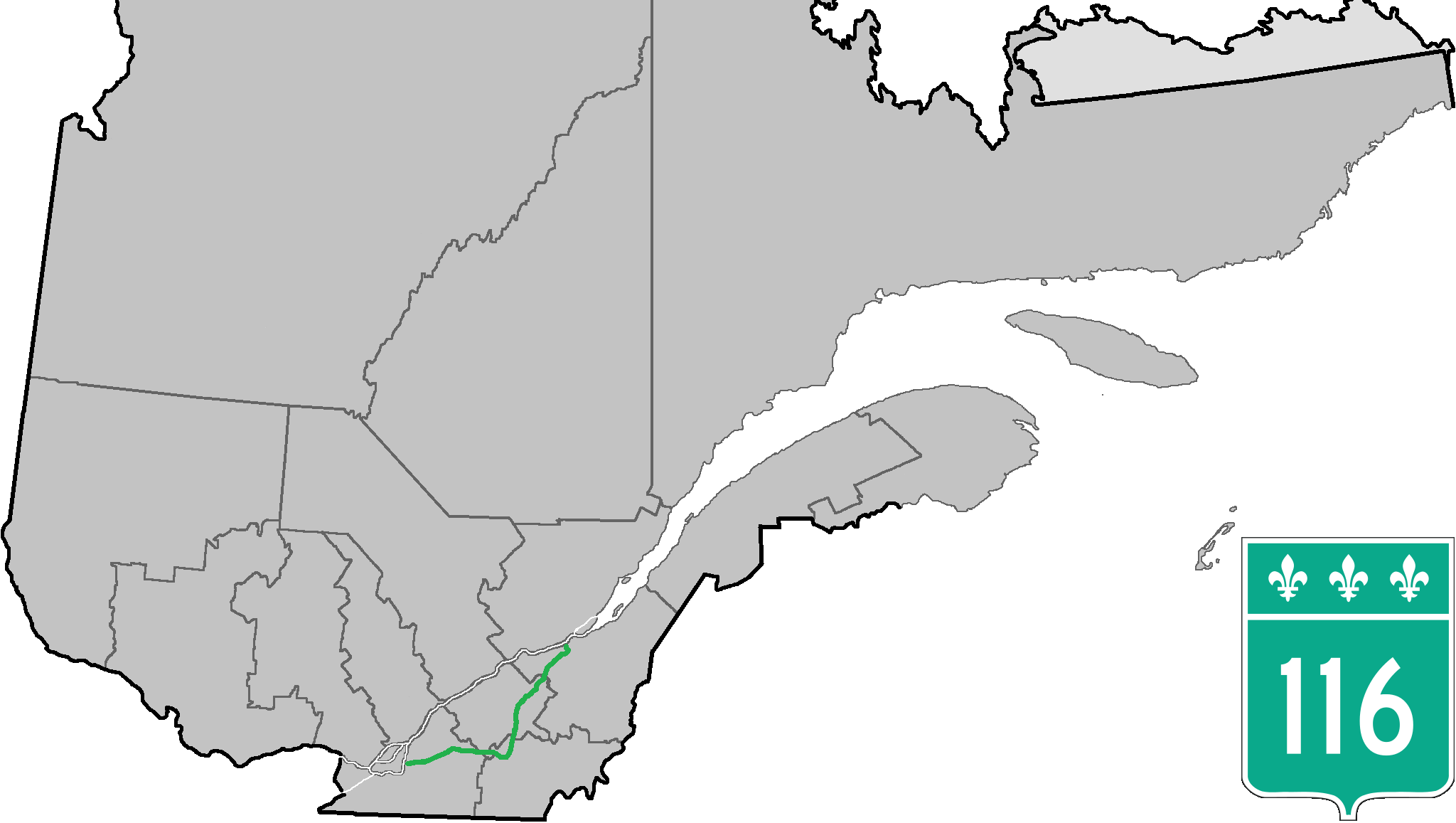

Route information
- Maintained by Transports Québec
- Length: 267.3 km (166.1 mi)
- History: Route 5 (Richmond–Saint-Nicolas); Route 9 (LeMoyne–Saint-Simon); Route 32 (Saint-Simon–Richmond); A-16 (Unbuilt; LeMoyne–Saint-Hubert)

Major junctions
- West end: R-112 / R-134 in Longueuil
- A-30 in Saint-Bruno-de-Montarville; R-133 in Mont-Saint-Hilaire; R-137 in Saint-Hyacinthe; A-20 (TCH) in Saint-Simon; R-139 in Acton Vale; A-55 in Richmond; R-122 / R-161 in Victoriaville; R-165 in Princeville and Plessisville; A-20 (TCH) / R-171 in Lévis
- East end: R-132 in Lévis

Location
- Country: Canada
- Province: Quebec
- Major cities: Longueuil, Lévis, Saint-Hyacinthe

Highway system
- Quebec provincial highways; Autoroutes; List; Former
← R-113	→ R-117

Route 116 is an east/west highway on the south shore of the St. Lawrence River in Quebec, Canada. It runs between Route 134 in Longueuil and Route 132 in Lévis, connecting the south shore areas of Montreal and Quebec City; it also serves the administrative regions of Montérégie, Centre-du-Québec, Estrie and Chaudière-Appalaches. Until the mid-1970s it was known as Route 9 between Le Moyne (presently part of Longueuil) and Saint-Simon; Route 32 between Saint-Simon and Richmond; and Route 5 between Richmond and Saint-Nicolas (presently part of Lévis).

== Route description ==
Route 116 begins in Longueuil at the junction of Route 134 (Boulevard Taschereau) in Borough of Le Moyne and called Boulevard Sir Wilfrid-Laurier, and name that it holds until Autoroute 20 east of Saint-Hyacinthe. Route 116 shares a concurrency with Route 112 until Saint-Hubert, just south of the Saint-Hubert Municipal Airport, to the junction of Autoroute 30 in Saint-Bruno-de-Montarville. This section is a controlled-access Autoroute-grade freeway. This portion was once envisioned to be part of Autoroute 16. An unofficial extension of Route 116 as thought of by locals, from the western terminus follows the Route 134 limited access expressway to the Jacques Cartier Bridge.

East of Autoroute 30, Route 116 is a high-volume, divided expressway with at-grade intersections as it passes through the growing South Shore suburbs of Montreal. It overlaps with Autoroute 20 for 6 km (4 mi), then has lighter traffic counts up to Richmond. Between Richmond and Plessisville traffic is heavier as it passes bigger towns as it is located further away from Autoroute 20; however the section from Plessisville and Lévis does not have much traffic due to its proximity to Autoroute 20.

== Municipalities along Quebec 116 ==
- Longueuil
- Saint-Bruno-de-Montarville
- Saint-Basile-le-Grand
- McMasterville
- Beloeil
- Mont-Saint-Hilaire
- Sainte-Marie-Madeleine
- Sainte-Madeleine
- Saint-Hyacinthe
- Saint-Simon
- Saint-Liboire
- Upton
- Acton Vale
- Sainte-Christine
- Durham-Sud
- Melbourne
- Richmond
- Cleveland
- Danville
- Kingsey Falls
- Warwick
- Saint-Christophe-d'Arthabaska
- Victoriaville
- Princeville
- Plessisville
- Laurierville
- Lyster
- Dosquet
- Saint-Agapit
- Saint-Gilles
- Lévis

== Major intersections ==
RCM	Location	km	mi	Exit	Destinations	Notes
Longueuil	Longueuil	0.0	0.0	1	R-112 (Rue Saint-Louis) / R-134 (Boulevard Taschereau) – La Prairie, Pont Victoria, Pont Champlain, Pont Jacques-Cartier, Montréal	Interchange; R-116 western terminus; west end of R-112 concurrency; west end of freeway
Longueuil	Longueuil	0.0	0.0	Boulevard Sir-Wilfrid-Laurier west end		
Longueuil	Longueuil	1.4– 2.0	0.87– 1.2	2	Boulevard Édouard	
Longueuil	Longueuil	4.5	2.8	4	R-112 east (Boulevard Cousineau) – Longueuil, Chambly	East end of R-112 concurrency; access to Saint-Hubert Airport
Longueuil	Saint-Bruno-de-Montarville	9.8– 11.3	6.1– 7.0	8	Boulevard des Promenades	Eastbound exit uses exit 9
Longueuil	Saint-Bruno-de-Montarville	9.8– 11.3	6.1– 7.0	9	A-30 – Sorel-Tracy, Vaudreuil-Dorion	A-30 exit 76; eastbound exit to A-30 west uses exit 8
Longueuil	Saint-Bruno-de-Montarville	11.3	7.0		Boulevard Seigneurial	At-grade; east end of freeway
La Vallée-du-Richelieu	McMasterville–Belœil boundary	21.8	13.5		R-229 north (Rue Bernard-Pilon)	West end of R-229 concurrencey
La Vallée-du-Richelieu	Belœil	24.0	14.9		To R-223 (Rue Richelieu) – Chambly, Vieux Belœil	Partially grade separated
La Vallée-du-Richelieu	Richelieu River	24.3	15.1	Pont Jordi-Bonet (Jordi-Bonet Bridge)		
La Vallée-du-Richelieu	Mont-Saint-Hilaire	24.6	15.3		R-133 (Chemin des Patriotes) – Otterburn Park, Saint-Jean-sur-Richelieu	Partially grade separated
La Vallée-du-Richelieu	Mont-Saint-Hilaire	27.1	16.8		To A-20 / Grande Allée	
La Vallée-du-Richelieu	Mont-Saint-Hilaire	29.7	18.5		R-229 south (Chemin Benoît) – Saint-Jean-Baptiste, Saint-Damase	East end of R-229 concurrency
Les Maskoutains	Sainte-Madeleine	33.7	20.9		R-227 to A-20 – Saint-Jean-Baptiste, Saint-Damase	
Les Maskoutains	Saint-Hyacinthe	43.5	27.0		R-231 south (Avenue Castelneau) / R-235 south – Saint-Damase, Saint-Pie	R-231 northern terminus; west end of R-235 concurrency
Les Maskoutains	Saint-Hyacinthe	45.6	28.3		R-235 north (Boulevard Choquette)	East end of R-235 concurrency
Les Maskoutains	Saint-Hyacinthe	46.7	29.0		R-137 north (Rue Sicotte) / Avenue de la Concorde	West end of R-137 concurrency
Les Maskoutains	Saint-Hyacinthe	47.4	29.5		R-137 south (Avenue Saint-Louis) – Granby	East end of R-137 concurrency
Les Maskoutains	Saint-Hyacinthe	50.8	31.6		R-224 / A-20 – Granby, Saint-Simon	
Les Maskoutains	Saint-Simon	57.3	35.6	141	A-20 (TCH) west – Montréal	West end of A-20 concurrency; eastbound access to R-211; exit numbers follow A-20
Les Maskoutains	Saint-Simon	57.3	35.6	Boulevard Sir-Wilfrid-Laurier east end		
Les Maskoutains	Saint-Simon	58.0	36.0	143	R-211 south – Saint-Valérien-de-Milton	
Les Maskoutains	Saint-Simon–Saint-Liboire boundary	60.4	37.5	145	Saint-Simon, Saint-Liboire	
Les Maskoutains	Saint-Simon–Saint-Liboire boundary	62.9	39.1	147	A-20 (TCH) east – Québec	East end of A-20 concurrency
Acton	Acton Vale	82.3	51.1		R-139 south – Roxton Falls, Granby	West end of R-139 concurrency
Acton	Acton Vale	83.1	51.6		R-139 south – Wickham, Drummondville	East end of R-139 concurrency
Drummond	No major junctions					
Le Val-Saint-François	Melbourne	115.5	71.8		A-55 – Drummondville, Sherbrooke	A-55 exit 88
Le Val-Saint-François	Richmond	117.0	72.7		R-143 north / R-243 south – Melbourne, Ulverton	West end of R-143 / R-243 concurrency
Le Val-Saint-François	Richmond	117.7	73.1		R-243 north – Saint-Félix-de-Kingsey	East end of R-243 concurrency
Le Val-Saint-François	Richmond	118.9	73.9		R-143 south – Windsor	East end of R-143 concurrency
Les Sources	Danville	135.5	84.2		R-255 north – Kingsey Falls	West end of R-255 concurrency
Les Sources	Danville	137.1	85.2		R-255 south – Val-des-Sources	East end of R-255 concurrency
Arthabaska	Warwick	156.5	97.2			
Arthabaska	Saint-Christophe-d'Arthabaska	167.0	103.8		R-161 south (Avenue Pie-X) – Chesterville, Disraeli	West end of R-161 concurrency
Arthabaska	Victoriaville	168.8	104.9		Boulevard des Bois-Francs – Centre-Ville	
Arthabaska	Victoriaville	170.5	105.9		Boulevard Jutras	
Arthabaska	Victoriaville	173.4	107.7		R-122 west / R-161 north (Boulevard Pierre-Roux) – Drummondville	R-122 eastern terminus; east end of R-161 concurrency; to A-955 north
L'Érable	Princeville	183.5	114.0		R-263 – Saint-Louis-de-Blandford, Saint-Norbert-d'Arthabaska	
L'Érable	Princeville	185.5	115.3		R-165 north to A-20 – Saint-Louis-de-Blandford	West end of R-165 concurrency
L'Érable	Plessisville	193.5	120.2		R-165 south – Saint-Ferdinand, Thetford Mines	East end of R-165 concurrency
L'Érable	Plessisville	195.0	121.2		R-267 south – Inverness	
L'Érable	Plessisville	195.6	121.5		R-265 north to A-20 – Notre-Dame-de-Lourdes	
L'Érable	Lyster	216.7	134.7		R-218 west – Notre-Dame-de-Lourdes	West end of R-218 concurrency
L'Érable	Lyster	218.8	136.0		R-218 east – Sainte-Agathe-de-Lotbinière	East end of R-218 concurrency
Lotbinière	Dosquet	232.8	144.7		R-271 to A-20 – Laurier-Station, Sainte-Agathe-de-Lotbinière	
Lotbinière	Saint-Agapit	246.0	152.9		R-273 north to A-20 – Saint-Apollinaire	West end of R-273 concurrency
Lotbinière	Saint-Agapit	246.6	153.2		R-273 south – Saint-Gilles	East end of R-165 concurrency
Lotbinière	Saint-Gilles	252.0	156.6		R-269 south – Saint-Gilles, Thetford Mines	
Lévis		261.0	162.2		R-171 north (Route Lagueux) to A-20 – Saint-Nicolas, Québec	West end of R-171 concurrency
Lévis		261.7	162.6		R-171 south (Rue du Pont) – Saint-Lambert-de-Lauzon	East end of R-171 concurrency
Lévis		271.2	168.5		A-20 (TCH) to A-73 – Montréal, Pont Laporte, Québec, Rivière-du-Loup	A-20 exit 311
Lévis		273.8	170.1		R-132 to R-175 – Saint-Antoine-de-Tilly, Pont de Québec, Lévis (Centre-Ville)	R-116 eastern terminus
1.000 mi = 1.609 km; 1.000 km = 0.621 mi: Concurrency terminus; Incomplete access

== See also ==
- List of Quebec provincial highways
