= Les Maskoutains Regional County Municipality =

Les Maskoutains
- Regional county municipality
- Location in province of Quebec.
- Coordinates: 45°37′N 72°57′W
- Country: Canada
- Province: Quebec
- Region: Montérégie
- Effective: January 1, 1982
- County seat: Saint-Hyacinthe

Government
  - Type: Prefecture
  - Prefect: Mme Francine Morin

Area
  - Total: 1,313.90 km^{2} (507.30 sq mi)
  - Land: 1,302.90 km^{2} (503.05 sq mi)

Population (2016)
  - Total: 87,099
  - Density: 66.9/km^{2} (173/sq mi)
  - Change 2011-2016: ▲3.4%
  - Dwellings: 40,244
- Time zone: UTC−5 (EST)
  - Summer (DST): UTC−4 (EDT)
- Area codes: 450 and 579
- Website: www.mrcmaskoutains.qc.ca

Les Maskoutains (French pronunciation: [le maskutɛ̃]) is a regional county municipality in the Montérégie region in southwestern Quebec, Canada. Its seat is in Saint-Hyacinthe.

The name comes from Algonquin word maskutew meaning "bear plain" in plular.

== Subdivisions ==
There are 17 subdivisions within the RCM:

Cities & Towns (2)

- Saint-Hyacinthe
- Saint-Pie

Municipalities (13)

- La Présentation
- Saint-Barnabé-Sud
- Saint-Bernard-de-Michaudville
- Saint-Damase
- Saint-Dominique
- Saint-Hugues
- Saint-Jude
- Saint-Liboire
- Saint-Louis
- Saint-Marcel-de-Richelieu
- Saint-Simon
- Saint-Valérien-de-Milton
- Sainte-Hélène-de-Bagot

Parishes (1)

- Sainte-Marie-Madeleine

Villages (1)

- Sainte-Madeleine

== Demographics ==
=== Population ===
Canada census – Les Maskoutains community profile

	2021	2016	2011
Population	89,432 (+2.7% from 2016)	87,099 (+3.4% from 2011)	84,248 (+4.4% from 2006)
Land area	1,302.15 km^{2} (502.76 sq mi)	1,302.90 km^{2} (503.05 sq mi)	1,301.16 km^{2} (502.38 sq mi)
Population density	68.7/km^{2} (178/sq mi)	66.9/km^{2} (173/sq mi)	64.7/km^{2} (168/sq mi)
Median age	44.0 (M: 42.8, F: 45.2)	43.7 (M: 41.9, F: 45.5)	42.8 (M: 41.2, F: 44.4)
Private dwellings	41,625 (total) 39,931 (occupied)	40,244 (total)	38,387 (total)
Median household income	$67,500	$55,917	$50,253

References: 2021 2016 2011

Historical Census Data - Les Maskoutains Regional County Municipality, Quebec

Year	Pop.	±%
1991	76,845	—
1996	78,754	+2.5%

Year	Pop.	±%
2001	78,917	+0.2%
2006	80,694	+2.3%

Year	Pop.	±%
2011	84,248	+4.4%
2016	87,099	+3.4%

=== Language ===
Canada Census Mother Tongue - Les Maskoutains Regional County Municipality, Quebec
Census	Total	French			English			French & English			Other		
Year	Responses	Count	Trend	Pop %	Count	Trend	Pop %	Count	Trend	Pop %	Count	Trend	Pop %
2016	86,010	81,730	▲2.7%	95.0%	665	▲3.1%	0.8%	330	▲8.2%	0.4%	3,285	▲59.1%	2.50%
2011	82,625	79,610	▲4.2%	96.35%	645	▲16.2%	0.78%	305	▲69.4%	0.37%	2,065	▲16.7%	2.50%
2006	78,930	76,425	▲1.4%	96.83%	555	▲2.8%	0.70%	180	▼12.2%	0.23%	1,770	▲100.0%	2.24%
2001	77,025	75,395	▼0.4%	97.88%	540	▼28.9%	0.70%	205	▲20.6%	0.27%	885	▲22.9%	1.15%
1996	77,385	75,735	n/a	97.87%	760	n/a	0.98%	170	n/a	0.22%	720	n/a	0.93%

== Transportation ==
=== Access Routes ===
Highways and numbered routes that run through the municipality, including external routes that start or finish at the county border:

- Autoroutes
  - A-20 (TCH)
- Principal Highways
  - R-116
  - R-137
- Secondary Highways
  - R-211
  - R-224
  - R-227
  - R-229
  - R-231
  - R-233
  - R-235
  - R-239
- External Routes
  - None

== See also ==
- List of regional county municipalities and equivalent territories in Quebec
