= Quebec Route 224 =

Highway in Quebec, Canada

Route 224

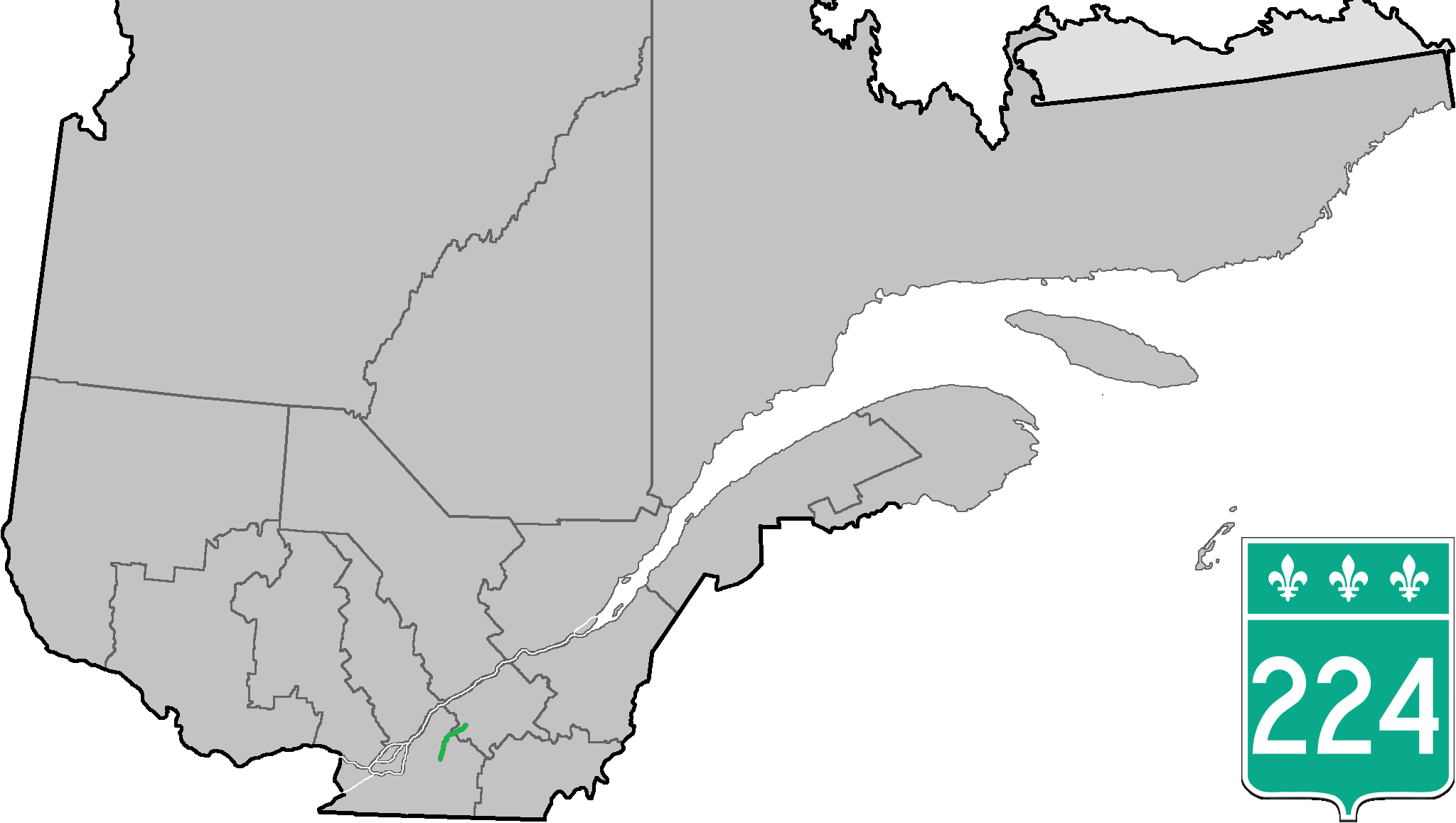

Route information
- Maintained by Transports Québec
- Length: 50.5 km (31.4 mi)

Major junctions
- West end: R-116 / R-137 in Saint-Hyacinthe
- A-20 (TCH) / R-116 / R-137 in Saint-Hyacinthe; R-239 in Saint-Marcel-De-Richelieu; R-239 in Saint-Guillaume; R-122 east of Saint-Guillaume
- East end: R-143 in Saint-Bonaventure

Location
- Country: Canada
- Province: Quebec

Highway system
- Quebec provincial highways; Autoroutes; List; Former
← R-223	→ R-225

Route 224 is a provincial highway located in the Montérégie and Centre-du-Québec regions of Quebec. The 48-kilometer road runs from the junction of Route 137 south of Saint-Hyacinthe and runs northeastward pass Route 116 and Autoroute 20 towards its terminus in Saint-Bonaventure at the junction of Route 143. It is also concurrent with Route 239 in Saint-Marcel-de-Richelieu.

== Municipalities along Route 224 ==
- Saint-Hyacinthe
- Saint-Simon
- Saint Hugues
- Saint-Marcel-de-Richelieu
- Saint-Guillaume
- Saint-Bonaventure
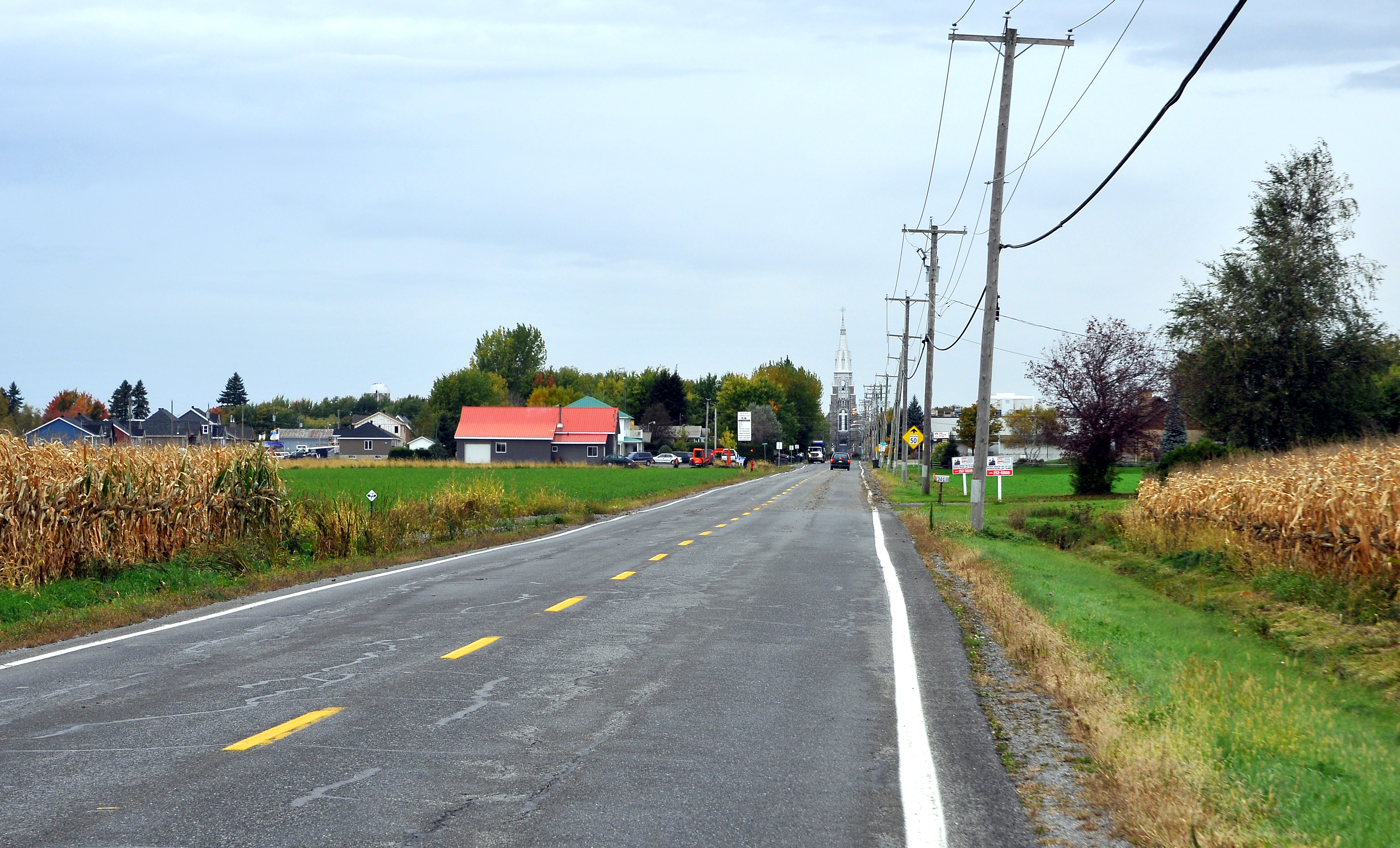
Route 224 in Saint-Simon.

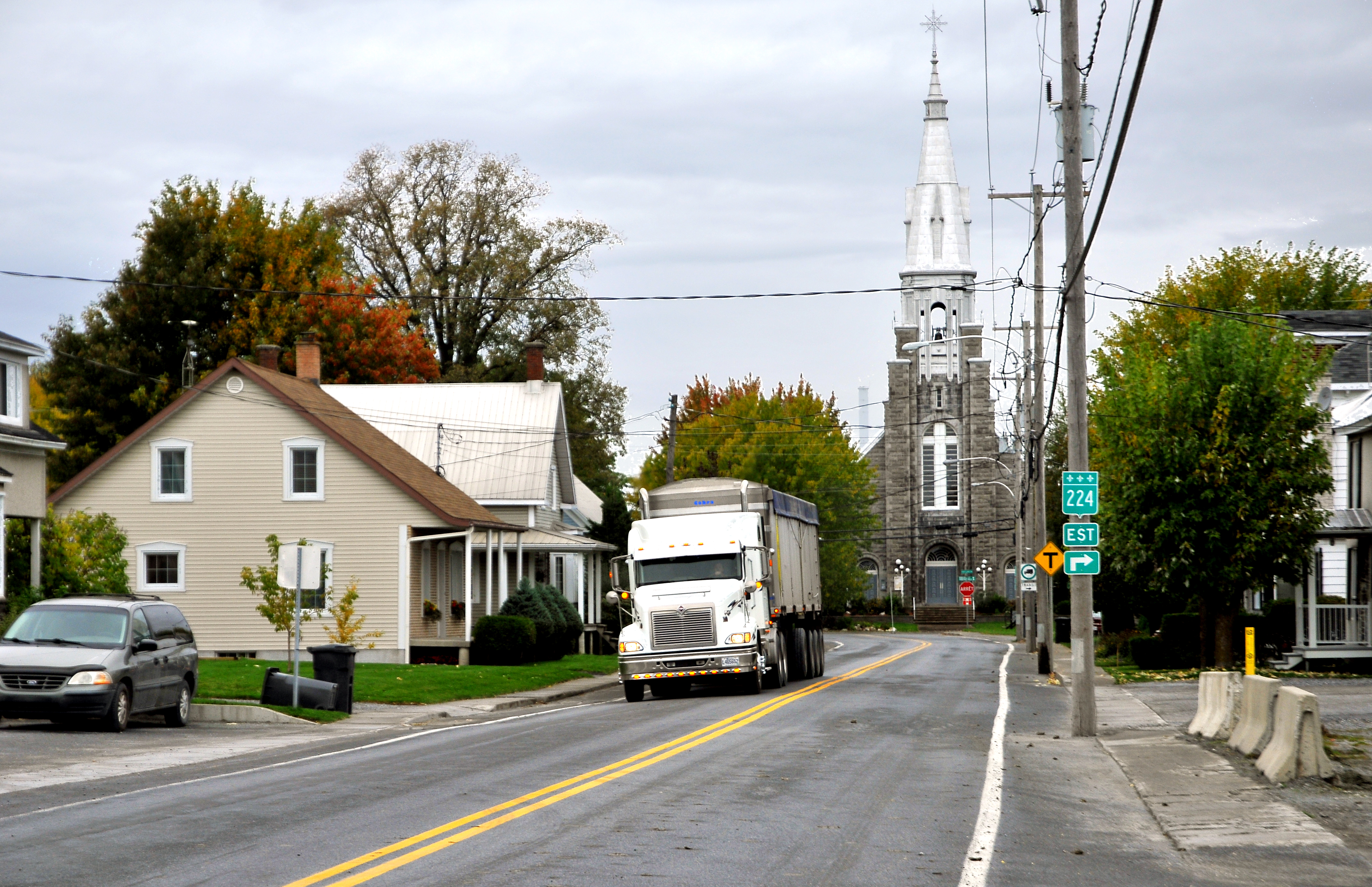
Rang Saint-Édouard in Saint-Simon.

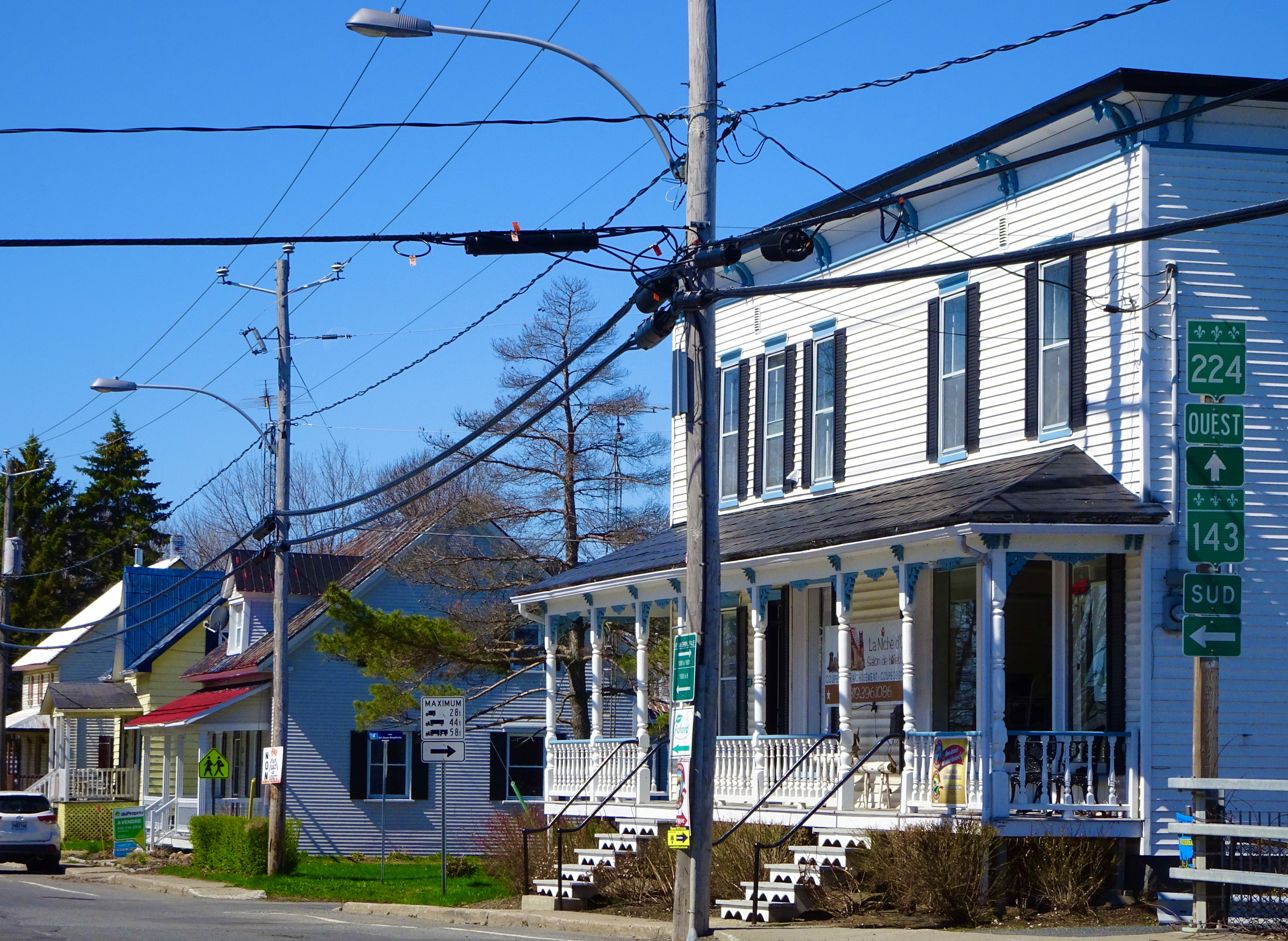
Route 224 eastern end in Saint-Bonaventure.

== See also ==
- List of Quebec provincial highways
