= Quebec Route 211 =

Highway in Quebec, Canada

Route 211

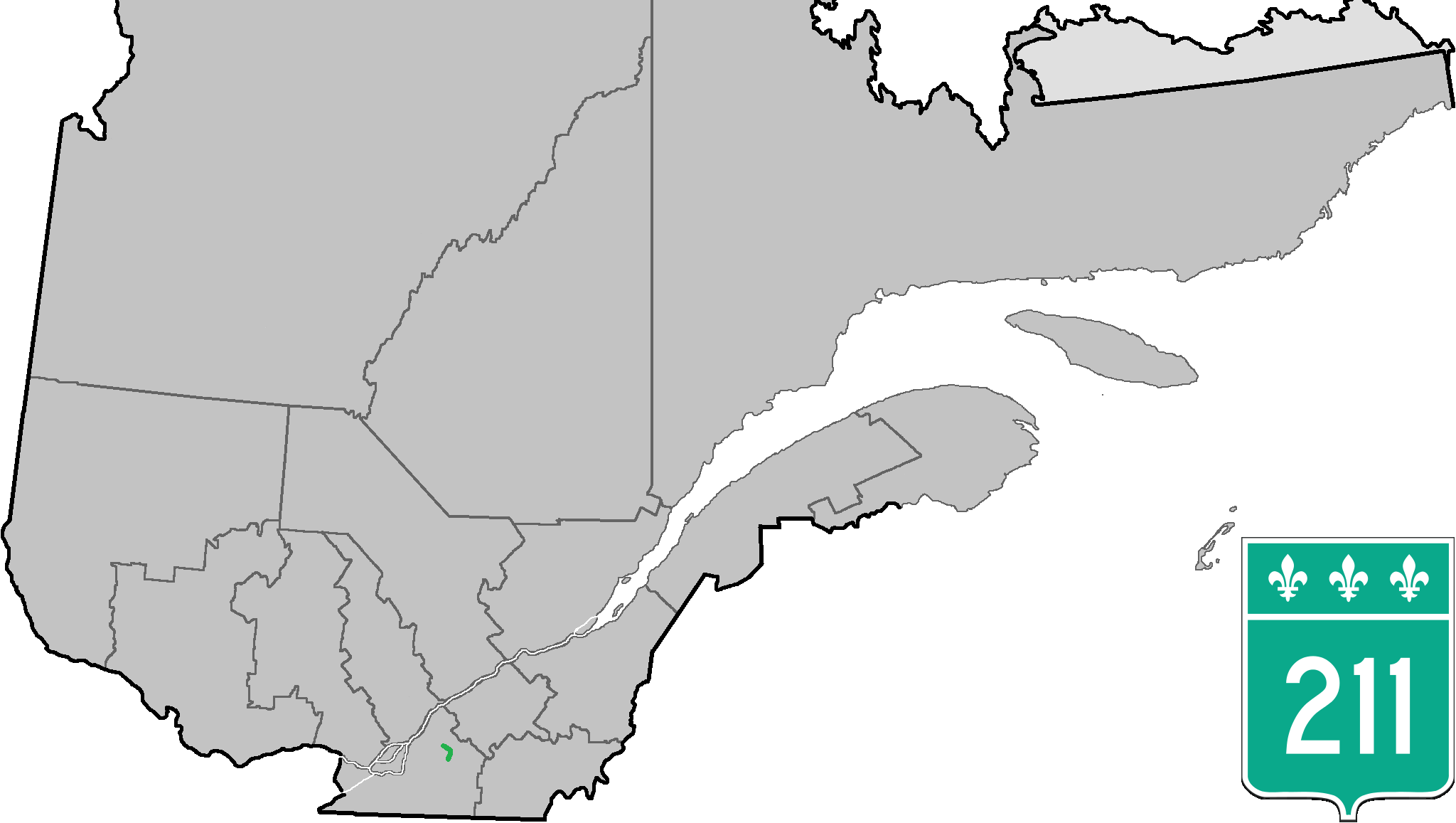

Route information
- Maintained by Transports Québec
- Length: 26.2 km (16.3 mi)

Major junctions
- South end: R-137 in Sainte-Cécile-de-Milton
- North end: A-20 (TCH) in Saint-Simon

Location
- Country: Canada
- Province: Quebec

Highway system
- Quebec provincial highways; Autoroutes; List; Former
← R-210	→ R-212

Quebec Route 211 is a provincial highway in the Canadian province of Quebec. Located in the Montérégie and Estrie regions in the southern part of the province, the highway's southern terminus is at Route 137 north of Granby and its northern terminus is at Quebec Autoroute 20 in Saint-Simon, east of Saint-Hyacinthe.

== Municipalities along Route 211 ==
- Sainte-Cécile-de-Milton
- St-Valérien-de-Milton
- Upton
- Saint-Liboire
- Saint-Simon

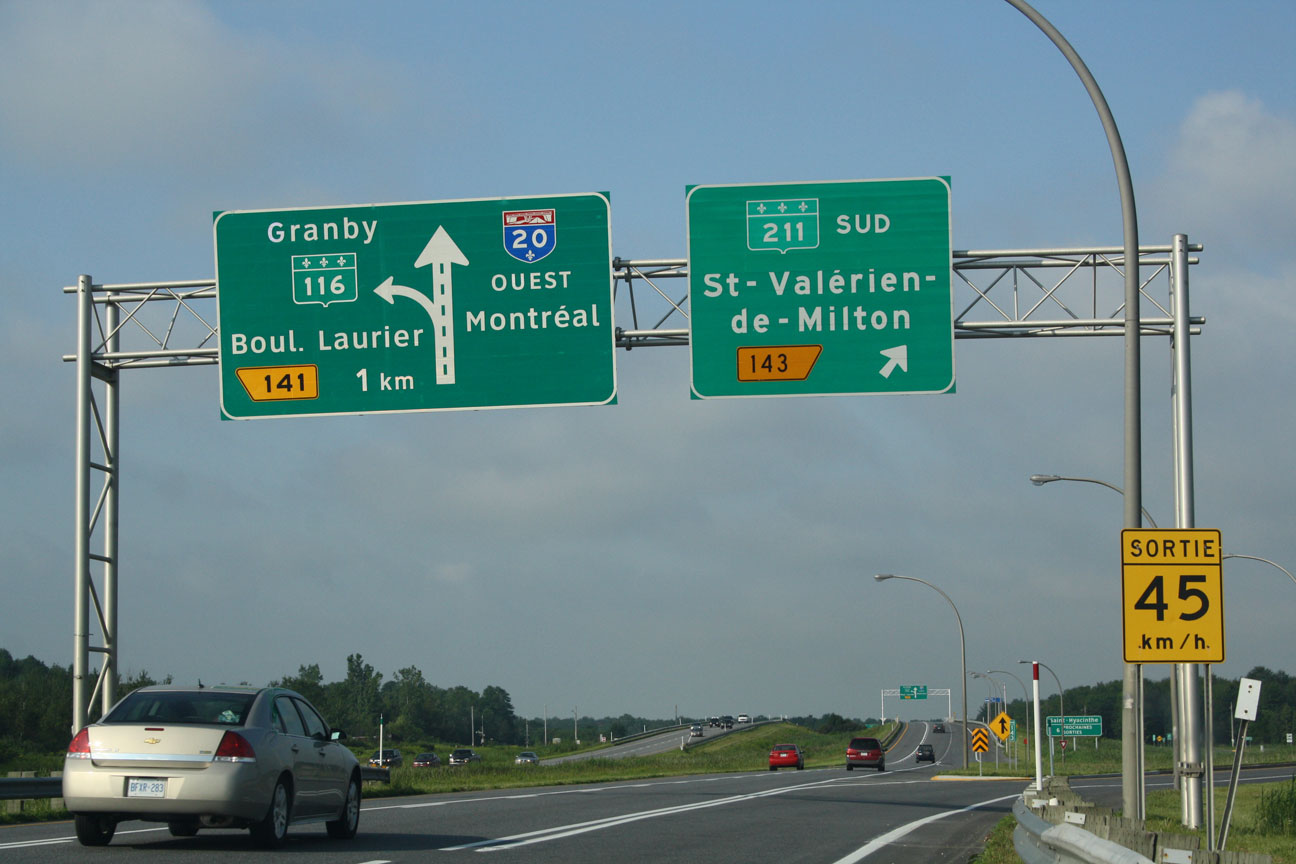
Interchange with Autoroute 20.

== Major intersections ==
RCM	Location	km	mi	Destinations	Notes
La Haute-Yamaska	Sainte-Cécile-de-Milton	0	0.0	R-137 – Granby, Saint-Dominique	Southern terminus
Les Maskoutains	Saint-Simon	26.1	16.2	A-20 (TCH) – Sainte-Hélène-de-Bagot, Saint-Hyacinthe	Northern terminus; exit 143 (A-20)
1.000 mi = 1.609 km; 1.000 km = 0.621 mi

== See also ==
- List of Quebec provincial highways
