= Charles Bugnet =

French military officer (1884–1955)

Colonel Charles Valentin Marie Bugnet (14 August 1884 – 17 December 1955) was a French military officer who served, with the rank of Major, as aide-de-camp (orderly officer) to French General Ferdinand Foch from September 1919 until Foch's death in 1929. Bugnet served Marshal Foch for more than nine years, and he is credited with writing the first biography about Foch, Foch Speaks, finished in June 1929, just months after Foch's death in March of that year. Bugnet was also a writer of books. He died in Paris in 1955 of natural causes.

== Bibliography ==
- Bugnet, Charles, Rue Saint-Dominique et G.Q.G. ou les Trois dictatures de la guerre (Rue Saint-Dominique and G.Q.G. or the Three Dictatorships of War), Paris: Plon, 1937
- Bugnet, Charles, LTC, Mangin, Paris: Plon, 1934
- Bugnet, Charles, De Marrakech à la Kasbah Tadla, 1912-1913 (From Marrakech to Kasbah Tadla, 1912-1913), (published in the book Mangin, pgs. 111-131), OCLC #: 949109531
- Bugnet, Charles, LTC, Le Maréchal Lyautey (Marshal Lyautey), Paris: Plon, 1933
- Bugnet, Charles, LTC, Le Maréchal Joffree (Marshal Joffre), Tours: Mame, 1931
- Bugnet, Charles, Listening to Marshal Foch (1921-1929), Paris: Grasset, 1929 (translated by Russell Green)
- Bugnet, Charles, MAJ, Foch Speaks, New York: Dial, 1929
- Bugnet, Charles, Le Collier de Pierres de Lune (The Moonstone Necklace), Paris: Bernard Grasset, 1922
- Bugnet, Charles, La Flamme Ensevelie, poèmes (The Buried Flame: to war widows, poems), Paris: Emile-Paul, 1916
- Bugnet, Charles, Mater Consolata, poèmes (Gathered Fragments, poems), unknown publisher and date
- Bugnet, Charles, Sensibilis (Sensitivity), unknown publisher and date
