= Saint-Liboire =

- Municipality
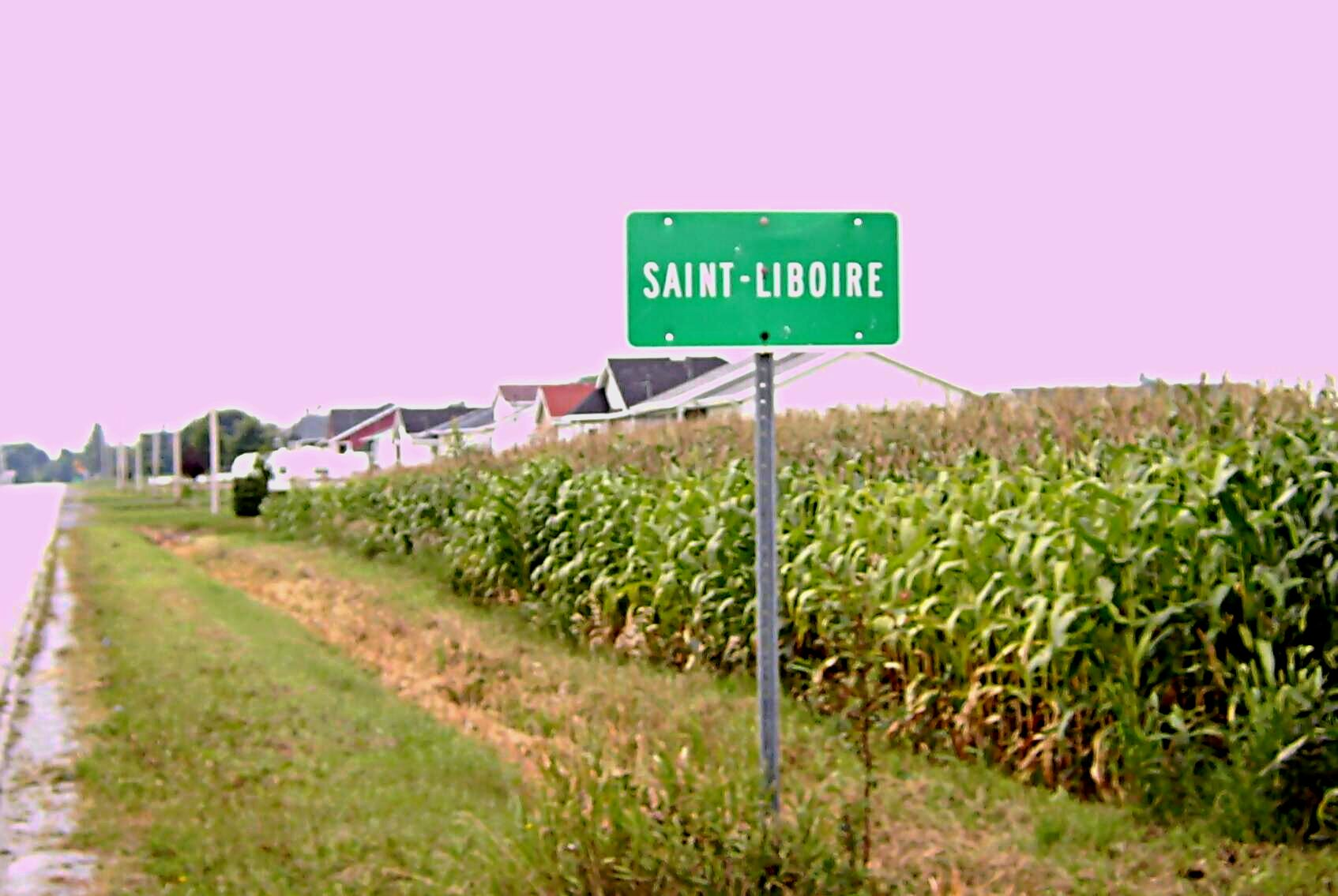

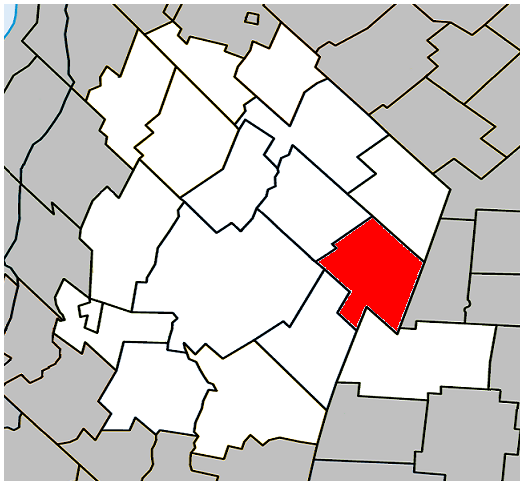
- Location within Les Maskoutains RCM

- Location in southern Quebec
- Coordinates: 45°39′N 72°46′W
- Country: Canada
- Province: Quebec
- Region: Montérégie
- RCM: Les Maskoutains
- Settled: 1710
- Constituted: August 17, 1994

Government
  - Mayor: Yves Winter
  - Federal riding: Saint-Hyacinthe—Bagot—Acton
  - Prov. riding: Daniel-Johnson

Area
  - Total: 75.20 km^{2} (29.03 sq mi)
  - Land: 72.74 km^{2} (28.09 sq mi)

Population (2011)
  - Total: 3,051
  - Density: 41.9/km^{2} (109/sq mi)
  - Pop 2006-2011: ▲5.4%
  - Dwellings: 1,107
- Time zone: UTC−05:00 (EST)
  - Summer (DST): UTC−04:00 (EDT)
- Postal code(s): J0H 1R0
- Area codes: 450 and 579
- Highways A-20 (TCH): R-116; R-211
- Geocode: 54072
- People: Liboirois, Liboiroise
- Website: www.municipalite. st-liboire.qc.ca

Saint-Liboire (French pronunciation: [sɛ̃ libwaʁ]; formerly Saint-Liboire-de-Bagot) is a municipality in the municipalité régionale de comté des Maskoutains in Québec, Canada, located in the administrative region of Montérégie. The population as of the 2011 Canadian Census was 3,051.

== History ==
Before the foundation of Saint-Liboire, the actual town territory was included in the Seigneurie de Ramezay given to Claude de Ramezay near 1710.

The village municipality was founded in 1857 with the purpose to offer more arable lands to the Catholic colonists coming from the Saint-Hyacinthe region.

It became the chief town of Bagot County.

=== Reading suggestion ===
The book Centenaire de Saint-Liboire, 20-24 juin 1957 : album-souvenir, 1857-1957 written by Dollard Boucher and Armand Laliberté, and is available at the Bibliothèque et Archives nationales du Québec.

== Demographics ==
=== Population ===
Canada census – Saint-Liboire community profile

	2021	2011
Population	3,036 (-0.8% from 2016)	3,051 (+5.4% from 2006)
Land area	73.82 km^{2} (28.50 sq mi)	72.74 km^{2} (28.09 sq mi)
Population density	41.1/km^{2} (106/sq mi)	41.9/km^{2} (109/sq mi)
Median age	38.4 (M: 38.4, F: 38.4)	34.7 (M: 34.4, F: 34.9)
Private dwellings	1,150 (total)	1,107 (total)
Median household income		$58,991

References: 2021 2011

Historical Census Data - Saint-Liboire, Quebec

Year	Pop.	±%
1991	2,287	—
1996	2,594	+13.4%

Year	Pop.	±%
2001	2,829	+9.1%
2006	2,895	+2.3%

Year	Pop.	±%
2011	3,051	+5.4%

=== Language ===
Canada Census Mother Tongue - Saint-Liboire, Quebec
Census	Total	French			English			French & English			Other		
Year	Responses	Count	Trend	Pop %	Count	Trend	Pop %	Count	Trend	Pop %	Count	Trend	Pop %
2011	3,040	3,010	▲4.9%	99.01%	10	▼33.3%	0.33%	0	0.0%	0.00%	20	▼33.3%	0.66%
2006	2,915	2,870	▲4.2%	98.46%	15	▼25.0%	0.51%	0	▼100.0%	0.00%	30	0.0%	1.03%
2001	2,815	2,755	▲8.5%	97.87%	20	▼20.0%	0.71%	10	▲ n/a%	0.35%	30	▲100.0%	1.07%
1996	2,580	2,540	n/a	98.45%	25	n/a	0.97%	0	n/a	0.00%	15	n/a	0.58%

== See also ==
- List of municipalities in Quebec
