= La Présentation =

- Municipality
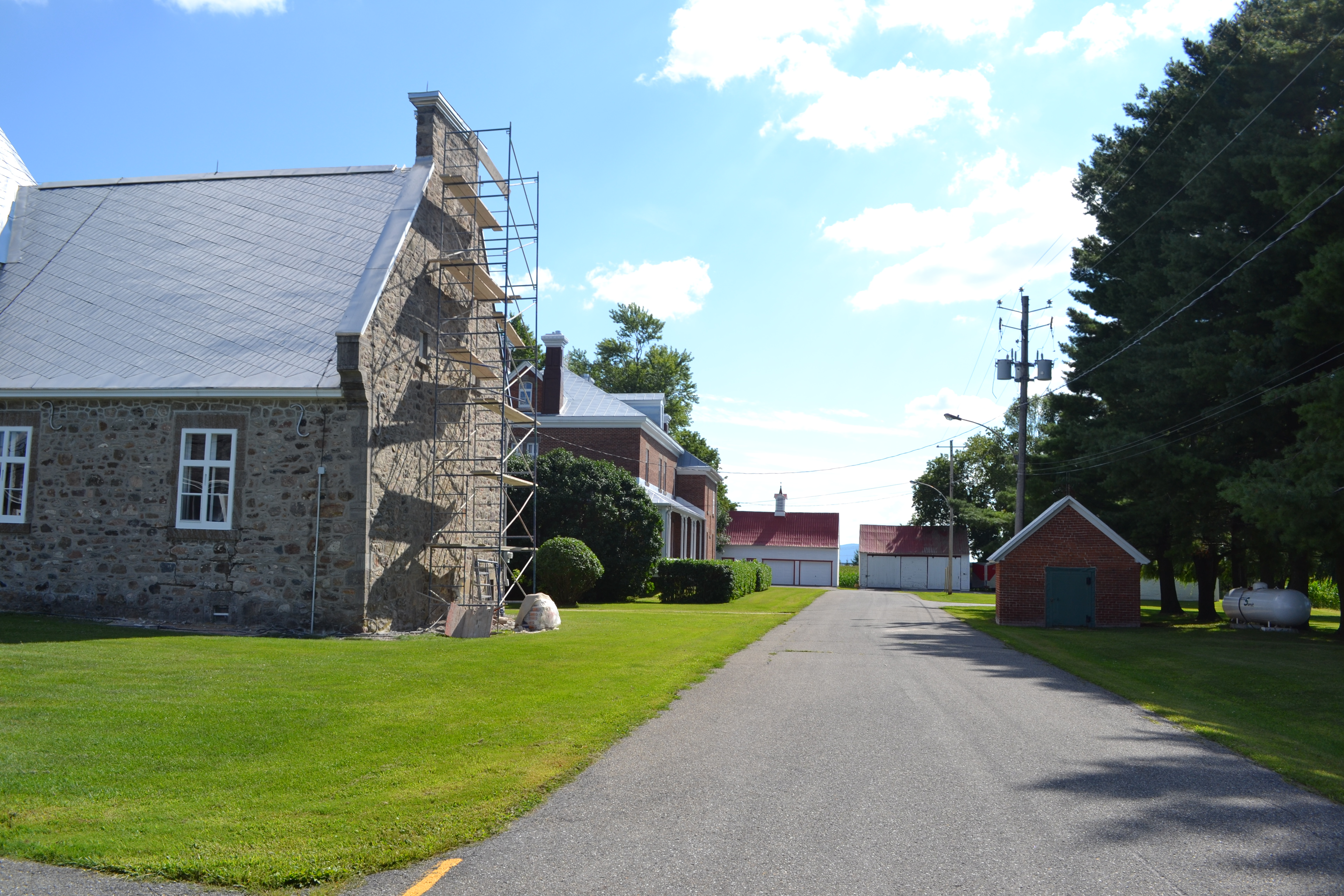

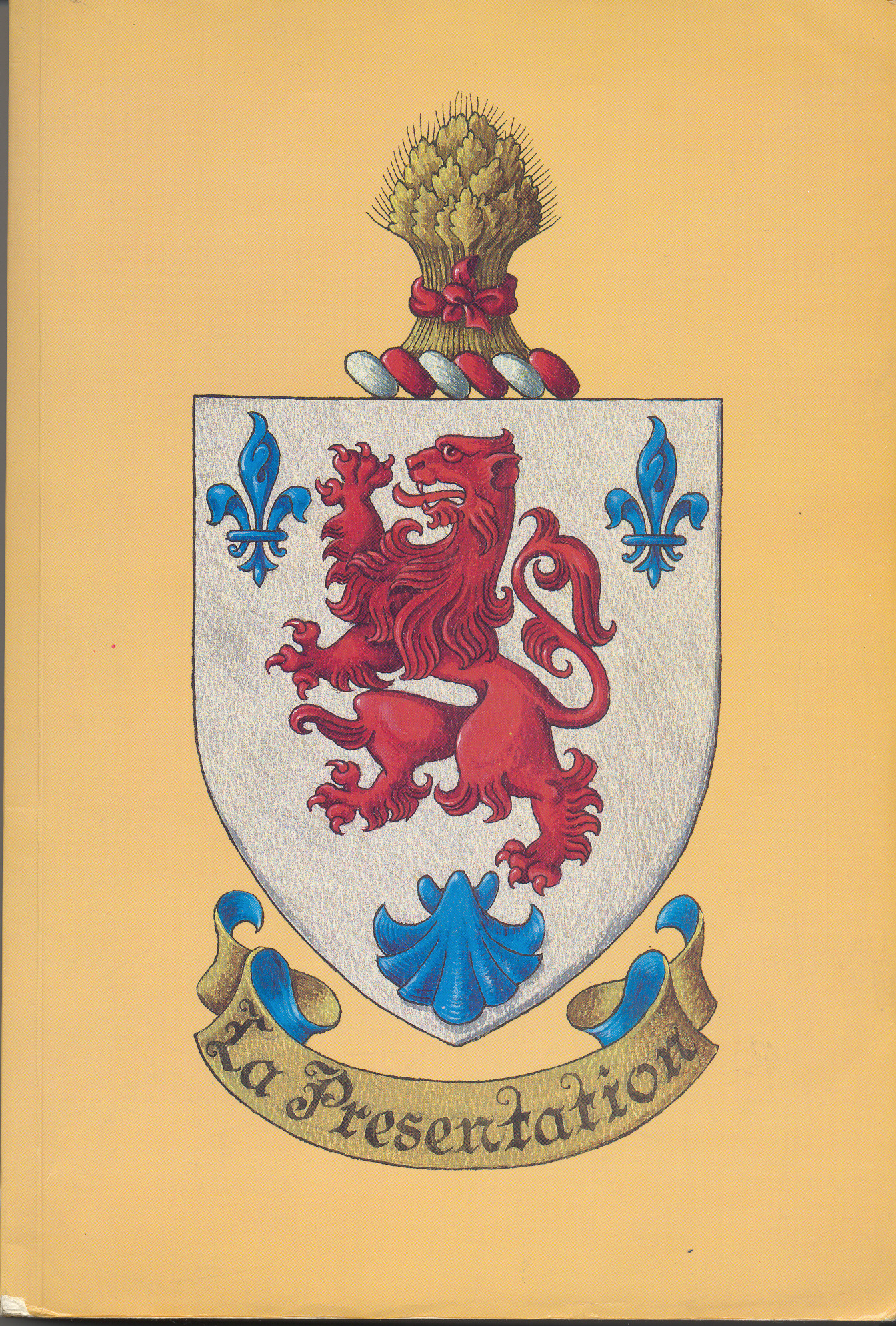
- Coat of arms

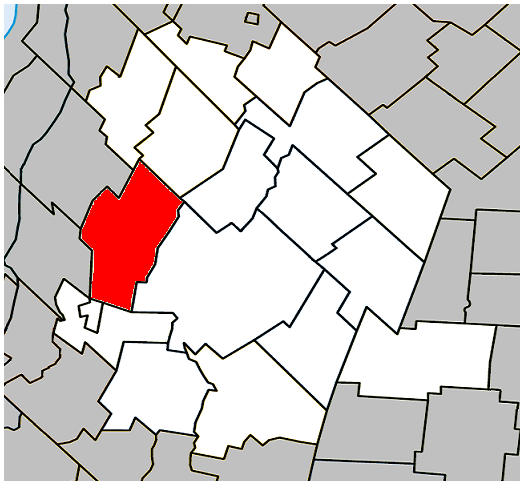
- Location within Les Maskoutains RCM

- Location in southern Quebec
- Coordinates: 45°40′N 73°03′W
- Country: Canada
- Province: Quebec
- Region: Montérégie
- RCM: Les Maskoutains
- Constituted: July 1, 1855

Government
  - Mayor: Louise Arpin
  - Federal riding: Saint-Hyacinthe—Bagot—Acton
  - Prov. riding: Saint-Hyacinthe

Area
  - Land: 94.39 km^{2} (36.44 sq mi)

Population (2021)
  - Total: 2,638
  - Density: 27.9/km^{2} (72/sq mi)
  - Pop 2016-2021: ▲3.9%
  - Dwellings: 1,070
- Time zone: UTC−5 (EST)
  - Summer (DST): UTC−4 (EDT)
- Postal code(s): J0H 1B0
- Area codes: 450 and 579
- Highways A-20 (TCH): R-137
- Website: www.municipalitelapresentation.qc.ca

La Présentation (French pronunciation: [la pʁezɑ̃tasjɔ̃]) is a Canadian municipality, located on the Salvail River in the Maskoutains region of southern Quebec. As of the 2021 Canadian census, the population was 2,638.

== Etymology ==
The name of the municipality commemorates the Presentation of Mary, referring to the extra-Biblical event in which the Mary, mother of Jesus, was first presented in the Temple in Jerusalem by her parents, Anne and Joachim. Inhabitants of the municipality may be called Présentationnois and, in the feminine form, Présentationnoises.

== History ==
The site of La Présentation is located in the drainage area of the Yamaska river, within the area used as hunting and travelling grounds by various Abenaki peoples before the French colonization of North America. By the turn of the 18th century, a significant portion of this Indigenous population had been settled in the missionary villages of Odanak and Wôlinak. Nevertheless, the general area remained largely uncolonized by European settlement before Jacques-Hyacinthe Simon dit Delorme became the seigneur of Maska in 1753, leading to the establishment of Saint-Hyacinthe.

Due to the growing European population in the region, the Roman Catholic parish of La Présentation-de-la-Sainte-Vierge was founded in 1806. Construction of a church for the parish was completed in 1820. The settlement was designated a parish municipality in 1845, then merged with the county municipality of Saint-Hyacinthe in 1847, then reestablished as a parish municipality in 1855. Its current status as a municipality was established in 2008.

== Demographics ==
=== Population ===
As of the 2021 Canadian census, La Présentation has a population of 2,638 and contains 1,096 private dwellings, of which 1,066 are occupied by permanent residents. The census recorded 560 children between the ages of 0 and 14, comprising 21.2% of the total population, and 390 adults who were 65 or older, comprising 14.8% of the total population.

Historical Census Data - La Présentation, Quebec
Year	Pop.	±%
1991	1,773	—
1996	1,851	+4.4%
2001	1,879	+1.5%
2006	2,115	+12.6%
2011	2,466	+16.6%
2016	2,540	+3.0%
2021	2,638	+3.9%

Within the 25% sample assessed by the census for religious identification, 80.7% of people identified as Christian, with 73.7% identifying specifically as Catholic, while the remainder reported being non-religious.

In 2020, the median income of residents aged 15 or over and housed in private residences was $45,600: the median among men was $51,200, while the median among women $41,600. The median household income was $89,000, falling to $75,500 after tax.

Canada census – La Présentation community profile

	2021	2011
Population	2,638 (+3.9% from 2016)	2,466 (+16.6% from 2006)
Land area	94.39 km^{2} (36.44 sq mi)	94.48 km^{2} (36.48 sq mi)
Population density	27.9/km^{2} (72/sq mi)	26.1/km^{2} (68/sq mi)
Median age	39.2 (M: 39.2, F: 38.8)	36.3 (M: 36.5, F: 36.1)
Private dwellings	1,096 (total) 1,066 (occupied)	988 (total)
Median household income	$89,000	$68,499

References: 2021 2011

=== Language ===
The 2021 Canadian census reported that, of La Présentation's population, 29.0% of the population could speak both French and English, while 70.8% could speak French but not English. Five people, comprising 0.2% of the population, stated they could only speak English, while another five people reported being unable to speak French or English. The mother tongue of 97.7% of the population was French, with another 0.4% being native speakers of both French and English, and 0.8% composed of native English speakers. No one reported being a native speaker an Indigenous language.

== See also ==
- List of municipalities in Quebec
