= Sainte-Madeleine, Quebec =

Sainte-Madeleine
- Village municipality
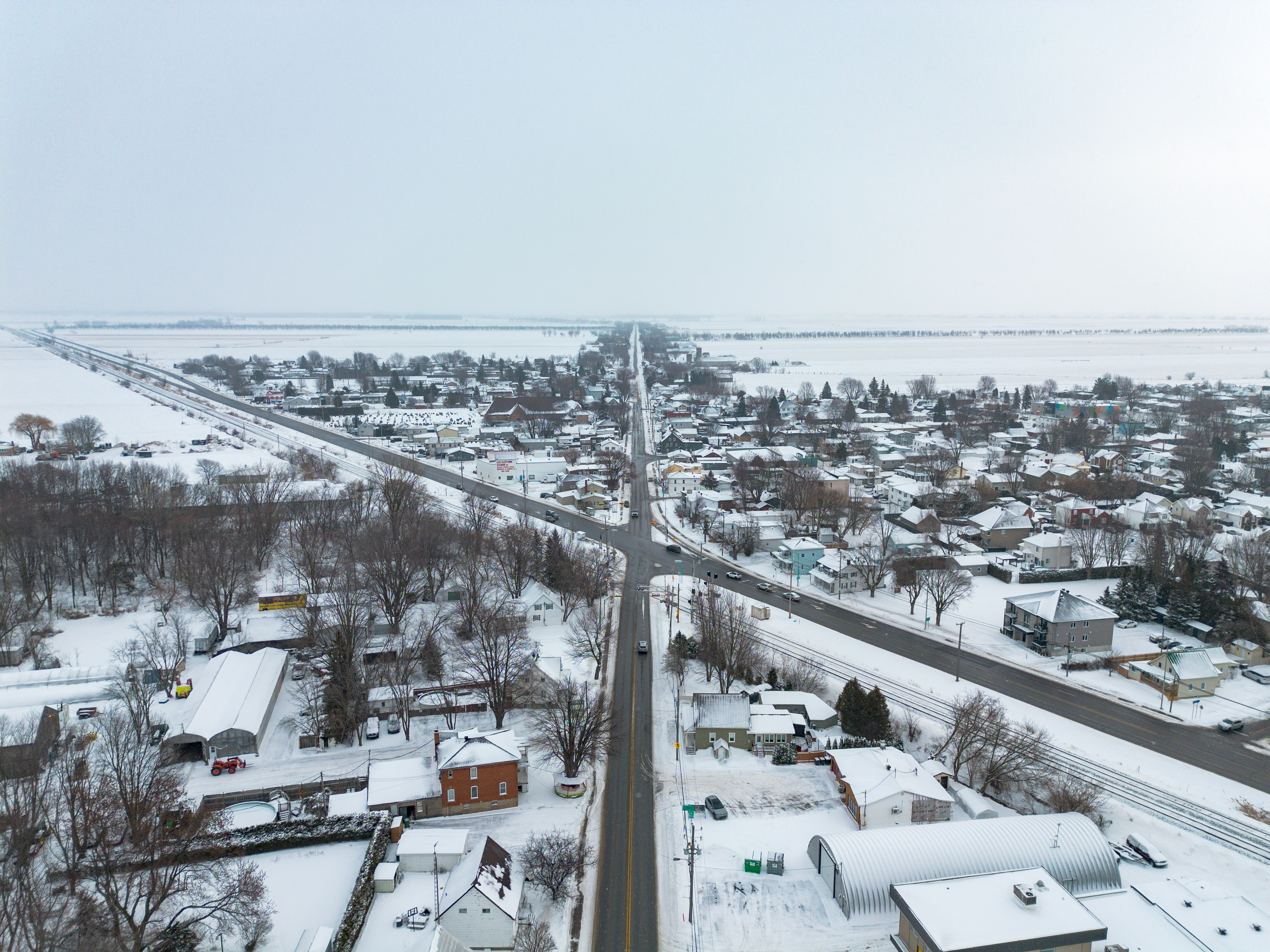
- Sainte-Madeleine in 2026

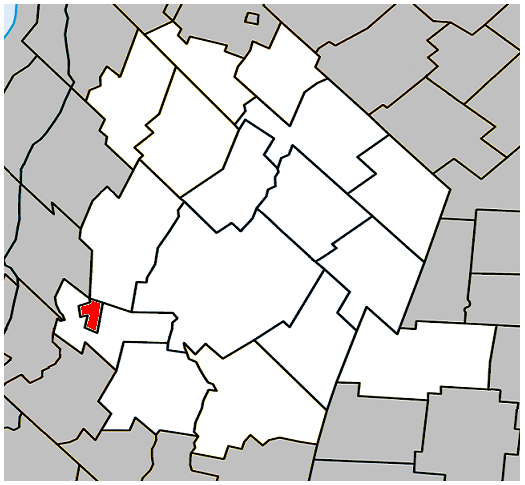
- Location within Les Maskoutains RCM

- Location in southern Quebec
- Coordinates: 45°36′N 73°06′W
- Country: Canada
- Province: Quebec
- Region: Montérégie
- RCM: Les Maskoutains
- Constituted: December 30, 1919
- Named for: Mary Magdalene

Government
  - Mayor: Marie-Hélène Demers
  - Federal riding: Saint-Hyacinthe—Bagot—Acton
  - Prov. riding: Saint-Hyacinthe

Area
  - Total: 5.30 km^{2} (2.05 sq mi)
  - Land: 5.36 km^{2} (2.07 sq mi)
- There is an apparent contradiction between two authoritative sources.

Population (2011)
  - Total: 2,356
  - Density: 439.8/km^{2} (1,139/sq mi)
  - Pop 2006-2011: ▲8.3%
  - Dwellings: 960
- Time zone: UTC−5 (EST)
  - Summer (DST): UTC−4 (EDT)
- Postal code(s): J0H 1S0
- Area codes: 450 and 579
- Highways A-20 (TCH): R-116; R-227
- Website: www.villestemadeleine.qc.ca

Sainte-Madeleine (French pronunciation: [sɛ̃t madlɛn]) is a village municipality in southwestern Quebec, Canada in Les Maskoutains Regional County Municipality. The population as of the Canada 2011 Census was 2,356.

Le Camping Ste-Madeleine, founded in 1967 for visitors to EXPO 67, is the area's principal tourist attraction. The annual musical event, the Festival Country du Camping Sainte-Madeleine, held in late July, attracts approximately 5,000 visitors to the community of 2,356.

Individuals born in Sainte-Madeleine include artist France Jodoin.

== Demographics ==
Historical Census Data - Sainte-Madeleine, Quebec
Year	Pop.	±%
1991	1,847	—
1996	1,993	+7.9%
2001	2,011	+0.9%
2006	2,175	+8.2%
2011	2,356	+8.3%

In the 2021 Census of Population conducted by Statistics Canada, Sainte-Madeleine had a population of 2,268 living in 957 of its 983 total private dwellings, a change of 1.6% from its 2016 population of 2,233. With a land area of 5.36 km^{2} (2.07 sq mi), it had a population density of 423.1/km^{2} (1,095.9/sq mi) in 2021.

Canada census – Sainte-Madeleine community profile

	2021	2011
Population	2,268 (+1.6% from 2016)	2,356 (+8.3% from 2006)
Land area	5.36 km^{2} (2.07 sq mi)	5.36 km^{2} (2.07 sq mi)
Population density	422.9/km^{2} (1,095/sq mi)	439.8/km^{2} (1,139/sq mi)
Median age	40.8 (M: 40.4, F: 40.8)	36.4 (M: 36.1, F: 36.8)
Private dwellings	960 (total)	960 (total)
Median household income		$64,997

References: 2021 2011

Canada Census Mother Tongue - Sainte-Madeleine, Quebec
Census	Total	French			English			French & English			Other		
Year	Responses	Count	Trend	Pop %	Count	Trend	Pop %	Count	Trend	Pop %	Count	Trend	Pop %
2011	2,355	2,305	▲8.0%	97.88%	15	▲50.0%	0.64%	10	▲ n/a%	0.42%	25	0.0%	1.06%
2006	2,170	2,135	▲6.8%	98.39%	10	0.0%	0.46%	0	0.0%	0.00%	25	▲150.0%	1.15%
2001	2,020	2,000	▲1.0%	99.01%	10	0.0%	0.49%	0	0.0%	0.00%	10	▲ n/a%	0.49%
1996	1,990	1,980	n/a	99.50%	10	n/a	0.50%	0	n/a	0.00%	0	n/a	0.00%

== See also ==
- List of village municipalities in Quebec
