= Sainte-Cécile-de-Milton =

- Municipality
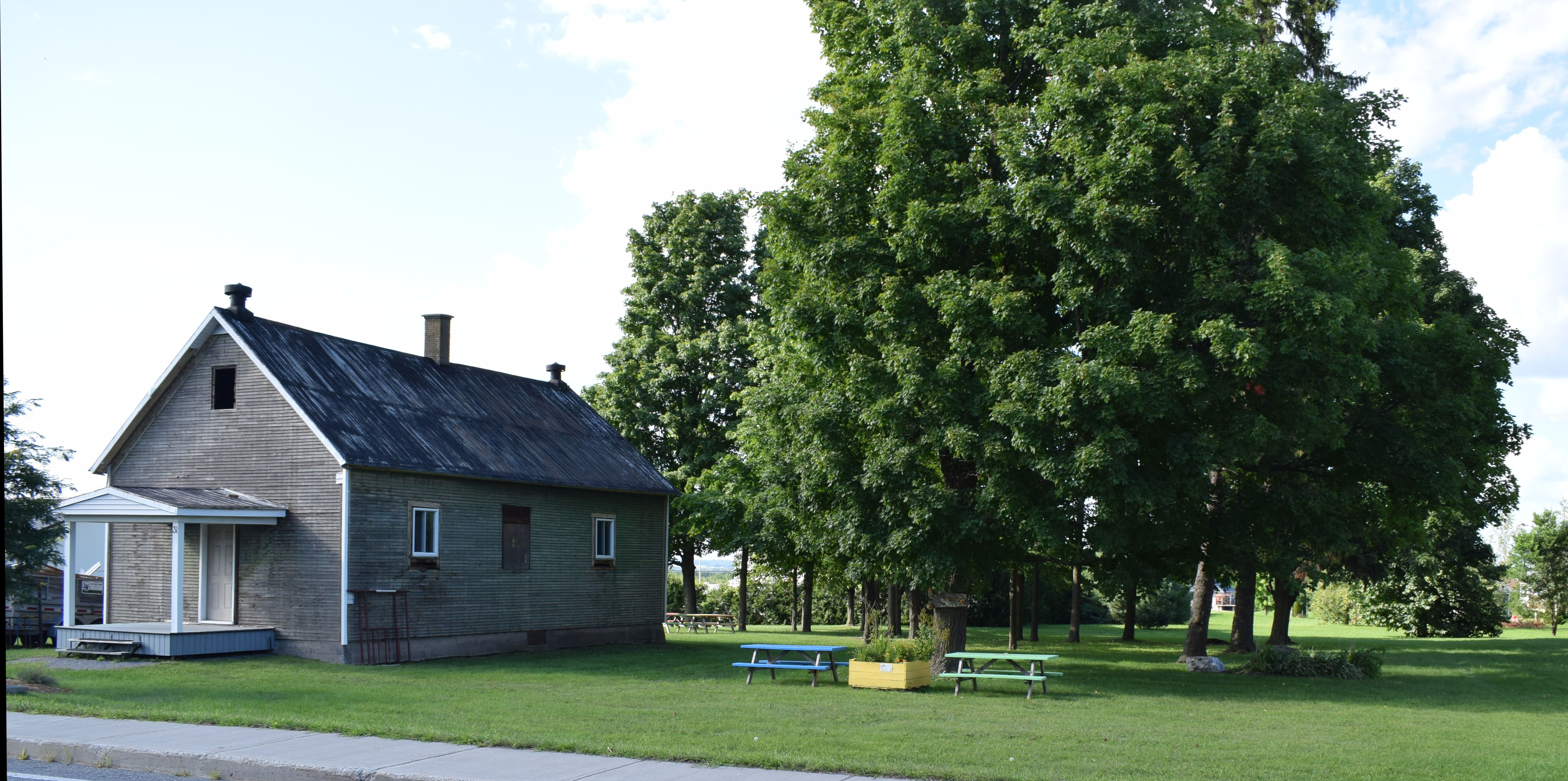
- old school and town hall

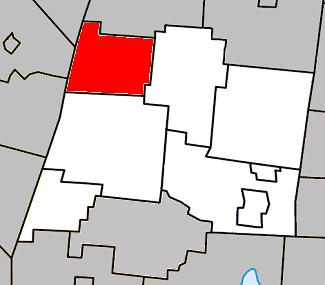
- Location within La Haute-Yamaska RCM

- Location in southern Quebec
- Coordinates: 45°29′N 72°45′W
- Country: Canada
- Province: Quebec
- Region: Estrie
- RCM: La Haute-Yamaska
- Constituted: January 1, 1864

Government
  - Mayor: Paul Sarrazin
  - Federal riding: Shefford
  - Prov. riding: Daniel-Johnson

Area
  - Total: 73.30 km^{2} (28.30 sq mi)
  - Land: 72.96 km^{2} (28.17 sq mi)

Population (2021)
  - Total: 2,195
  - Density: 30.1/km^{2} (78/sq mi)
  - Pop 2016-2021: ▲1.6%
  - Dwellings: 864
- Time zone: UTC−5 (EST)
  - Summer (DST): UTC−4 (EDT)
- Postal code(s): J0E 2C0
- Area codes: 450 and 579
- Highways: R-137; R-211
- Website: miltonqc.ca

Sainte-Cécile-de-Milton (French pronunciation: [sɛ̃t sesil də miltən]) is a municipality in the Canadian province of Quebec, located within La Haute-Yamaska Regional County Municipality. The population as of the Canada 2021 Census was 2,195.

== Demographics ==
=== Population ===
Population trend:

| Census | Population | Change (%) |
|---|---|---|
| 2021 | 2,195 | ▲1.6% |
| 2016 | 2,160 | ▲1.5% |
| 2011 | 2,128 | ▲5.1% |
| 2006 | 2,024 | ▲3.2% |
| 2001 | 1,961 | ▲3.8% |
| 1996 | 1,889 | ▲8.3% |
| 1991 | 1,745 | ▲4.0% |
| 1986 | 1,678 | ▲8.9% |
| 1981 | 1,541 | ▲14.0% |
| 1976 | 1,352 | ▲10.5% |
| 1971 | 1,224 | ▲5.6% |
| 1966 | 1,159 | ▲23.7% |
| 1961 | 937 | ▲16.8% |
| 1956 | 802 | ▲5.9% |
| 1951 | 757 | ▼9,1% |
| 1941 | 833 | ▲2.6% |
| 1931 | 812 | ▼9.3% |
| 1921 | 895 | ▼15.2% |
| 1911 | 1,055 | ▼7.6% |
| 1901 | 1,142 | ▼23.7% |
| 1891 | 1,496 | ▼1.3% |
| 1881 | 1,516 | ▼15.3% |
| 1871 | 1,791 | N/A |

=== Language ===
Mother tongue language (2021)

| Language | Population | Pct (%) |
|---|---|---|
| French only | 2,140 | 97.5% |
| English only | 30 | 1.4% |
| Both English and French | 10 | 0.5% |
| Other languages | 15 | 0.7% |

== See also ==
- List of municipalities in Quebec
