= Sainte-Marie-Madeleine, Quebec =

Sainte-Marie-Madeleine
- Parish municipality
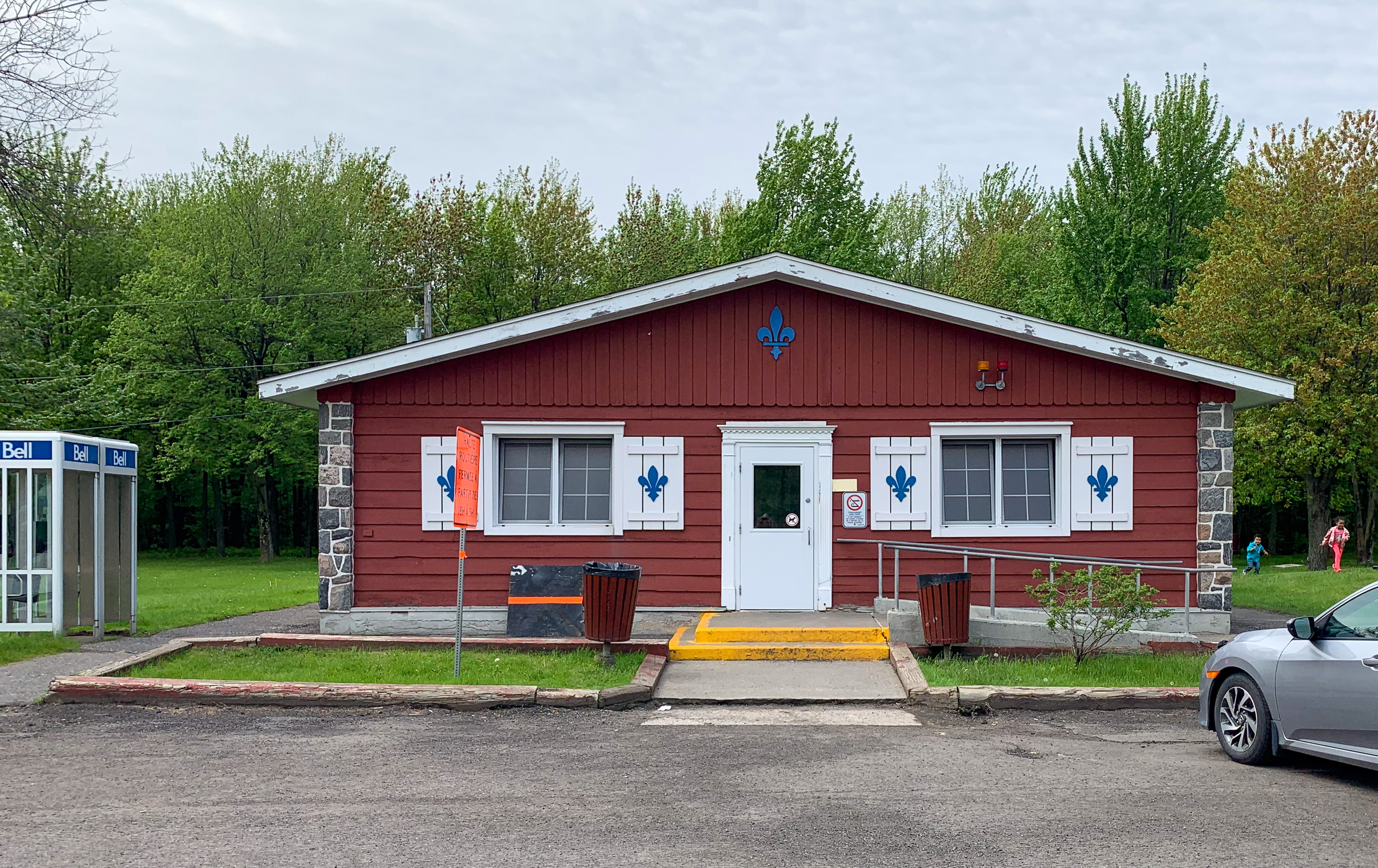

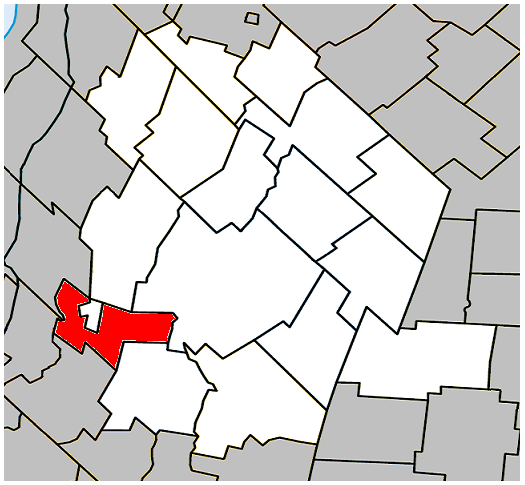
- Location within Les Maskoutains RCM.

- Location in southern Quebec.
- Coordinates: 45°36′N 73°06′W
- Country: Canada
- Province: Quebec
- Region: Montérégie
- RCM: Les Maskoutains
- Constituted: August 13, 1879

Government
  - Mayor: René-Carl Martin
  - Federal riding: Saint-Hyacinthe—Bagot—Acton
  - Prov. riding: Saint-Hyacinthe

Area
  - Total: 49.80 km^{2} (19.23 sq mi)
  - Land: 50.04 km^{2} (19.32 sq mi)
- There is an apparent contradiction between two authoritative sources

Population (2021)
  - Total: 2,876
  - Density: 57.5/km^{2} (149/sq mi)
  - Pop 2016-2021: ▼0.6%
  - Dwellings: 1,190
- Time zone: UTC−5 (EST)
  - Summer (DST): UTC−4 (EDT)
- Postal code(s): J0H 1S0
- Area codes: 450 and 579
- Highways A-20 (TCH): R-116; R-227; R-229
- Website: www.sainte-marie -madeleine.ca

Sainte-Marie-Madeleine (French pronunciation: [sɛ̃t maʁi madlɛn]) is a parish municipality in southwestern Quebec, Canada, in Les Maskoutains Regional County Municipality. The population as of the Canada 2021 Census was 2,876.

== Demographics ==
Historical Census Data - Sainte-Marie-Madeleine, Quebec
Year	Pop.	±%
1881	995	—
1891	936	−5.9%
1901	1,037	+10.8%
1911	1,039	+0.2%
1921	611	−41.2%
1931	579	−5.2%
1941	588	+1.6%
1951	570	−3.1%
1956	631	+10.7%
1961	642	+1.7%
1966	643	+0.2%
1971	697	+8.4%
1976	963	+38.2%
1981	1,516	+57.4%
1986	1,678	+10.7%
1991	2,113	+25.9%
1996	2,262	+7.1%
2001	2,466	+9.0%
2006	2,678	+8.6%
2011	2,935	+9.6%
2016	2,892	−1.5%
2021	2,876	−0.6%

In the 2021 Census of Population conducted by Statistics Canada, Sainte-Marie-Madeleine had a population of 2,876 living in 1,169 of its 1,190 total private dwellings, a change of −0.6% from its 2016 population of 2,892. With a land area of 50.04 km^{2} (19.32 sq mi), it had a population density of 57.5/km^{2} (148.9/sq mi) in 2021.

Canada census – Sainte-Marie-Madeleine community profile

	2021	2016	2011
Population	2,876 (-0.6% from 2016)	2,892 (-1.5% from 2011)	2,935 (+9.6% from 2006)
Land area	50.04 km^{2} (19.32 sq mi)	50.13 km^{2} (19.36 sq mi)	50.87 km^{2} (19.64 sq mi)
Population density	57.5/km^{2} (149/sq mi)	57.7/km^{2} (149/sq mi)	57.7/km^{2} (149/sq mi)
Median age	42.4 (M: 42, F: 42.4)	41.2 (M: 41.0, F: 41.4)	38.3 (M: 38.1, F: 39.0)
Private dwellings	1,170 (total)	1,167 (total)	1,141 (total)
Median household income	$86,000	$73,574	$62,152

References: 2021 2016 2011

Canada Census Mother Tongue - Sainte-Marie-Madeleine, Quebec
Census	Total	French			English			French & English			Other		
Year	Responses	Count	Trend	Pop %	Count	Trend	Pop %	Count	Trend	Pop %	Count	Trend	Pop %
2021	2,875	2,785	▼0.5%	96.9%	30	0.0%	1.0%	15	▲200.0%	0.5%	40	▼11.1%	1.4%
2016	2,890	2,800	▼1.9%	96.9%	30	▼14.3%	1.0%	5	▼75.0%	0.2%	45	▲80.0%	1.6%
2011	2,935	2,855	▲14.7%	97.3%	35	▼30.0%	1.2%	20	▲100.0%	0.7%	25	▼75.0%	0.9%
2006	2,650	2,490	▲3.3%	94.0%	50	▲233.3%	1.9%	10	▼33.3%	0.4%	100	▲400.0%	3.8%
2001	2,460	2,410	▲10.6%	98.0%	15	▼72.7%	0.6%	15	▲50.0%	0.6%	20	0.0%	0.8%
1996	2,265	2,180	n/a	96.3%	55	n/a	2.4%	10	n/a	0.4%	20	n/a	0.9%

== See also ==
- List of parish municipalities in Quebec
