= Sainte-Hélène-de-Bagot =

- Municipality
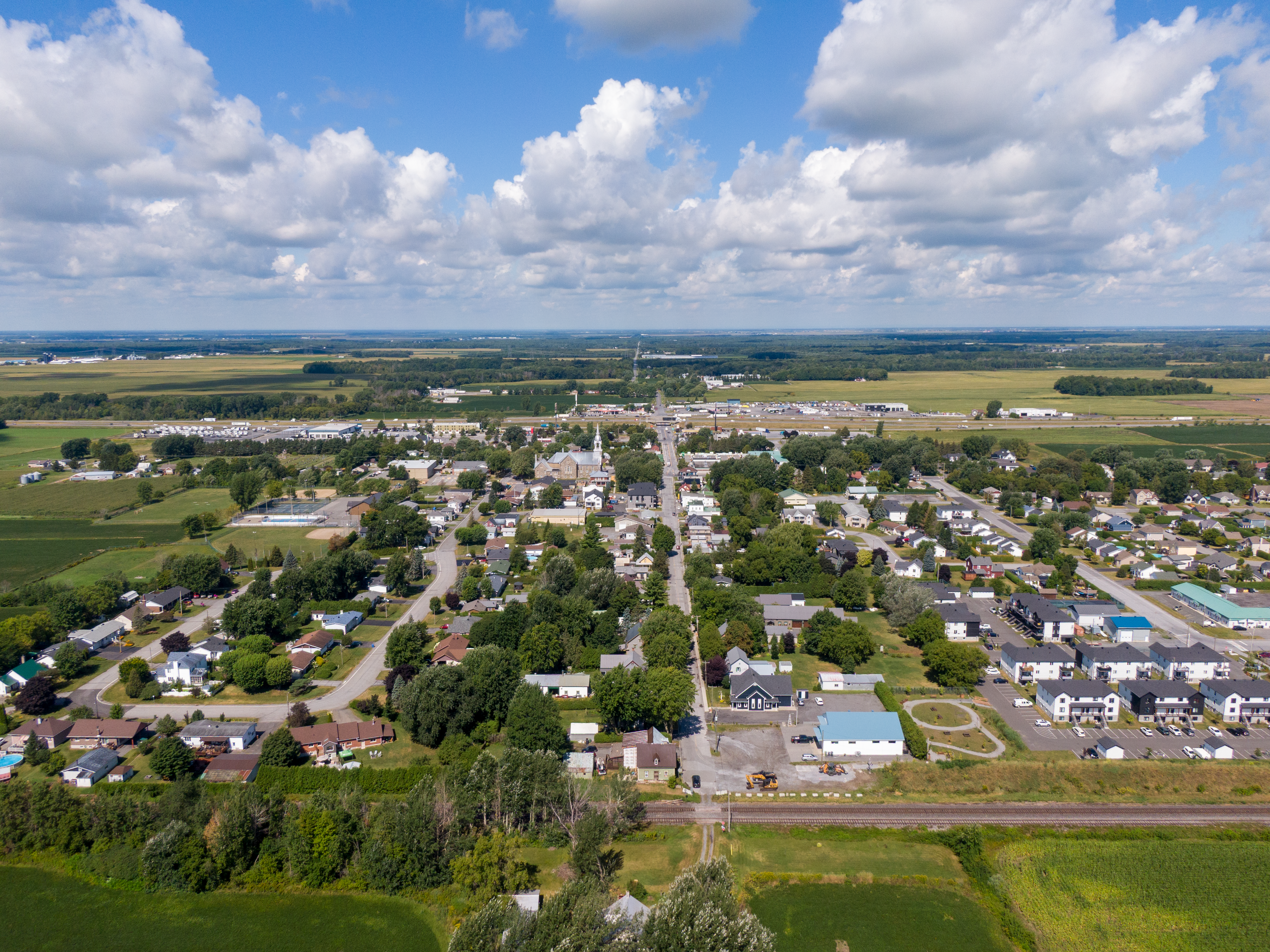
- Sainte-Hélène-de-Bagot in 2025

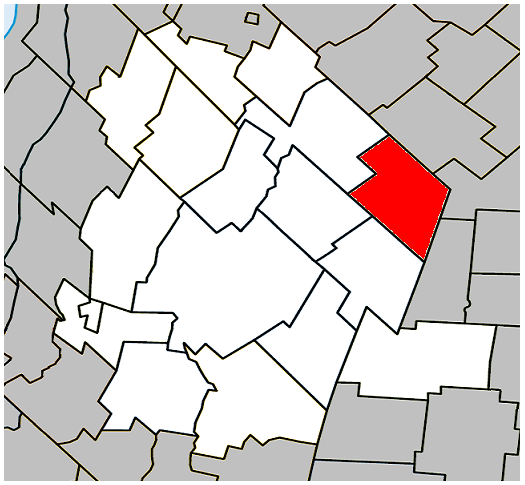
- Location within Les Maskoutains RCM.

- Location in southern Quebec.
- Coordinates: 45°44′N 72°44′W
- Country: Canada
- Province: Quebec
- Region: Montérégie
- RCM: Les Maskoutains
- Constituted: July 9, 1977

Government
  - Mayor: Réjean Rajotte
  - Federal riding: Saint-Hyacinthe—Bagot—Acton
  - Prov. riding: Daniel-Johnson

Area
  - Total: 71.40 km^{2} (27.57 sq mi)
  - Land: 73.42 km^{2} (28.35 sq mi)
- There is an apparent contradiction between two authoritative sources

Population (2011)
  - Total: 1,637
  - Density: 22.3/km^{2} (58/sq mi)
  - Pop 2006-2011: ▲13.2%
  - Dwellings: 701
- Time zone: UTC−5 (EST)
  - Summer (DST): UTC−4 (EDT)
- Postal code(s): J0H 1M0
- Area codes: 450 and 579
- Website: www.sainte helenedebagot.com

Sainte-Hélène-de-Bagot (French pronunciation: [sɛ̃t elɛn də baɡɔt]) is a municipality in southwestern Quebec, Canada in the Regional County Municipality of Les Maskoutains. The population as of the Canada 2011 Census was 1,637.

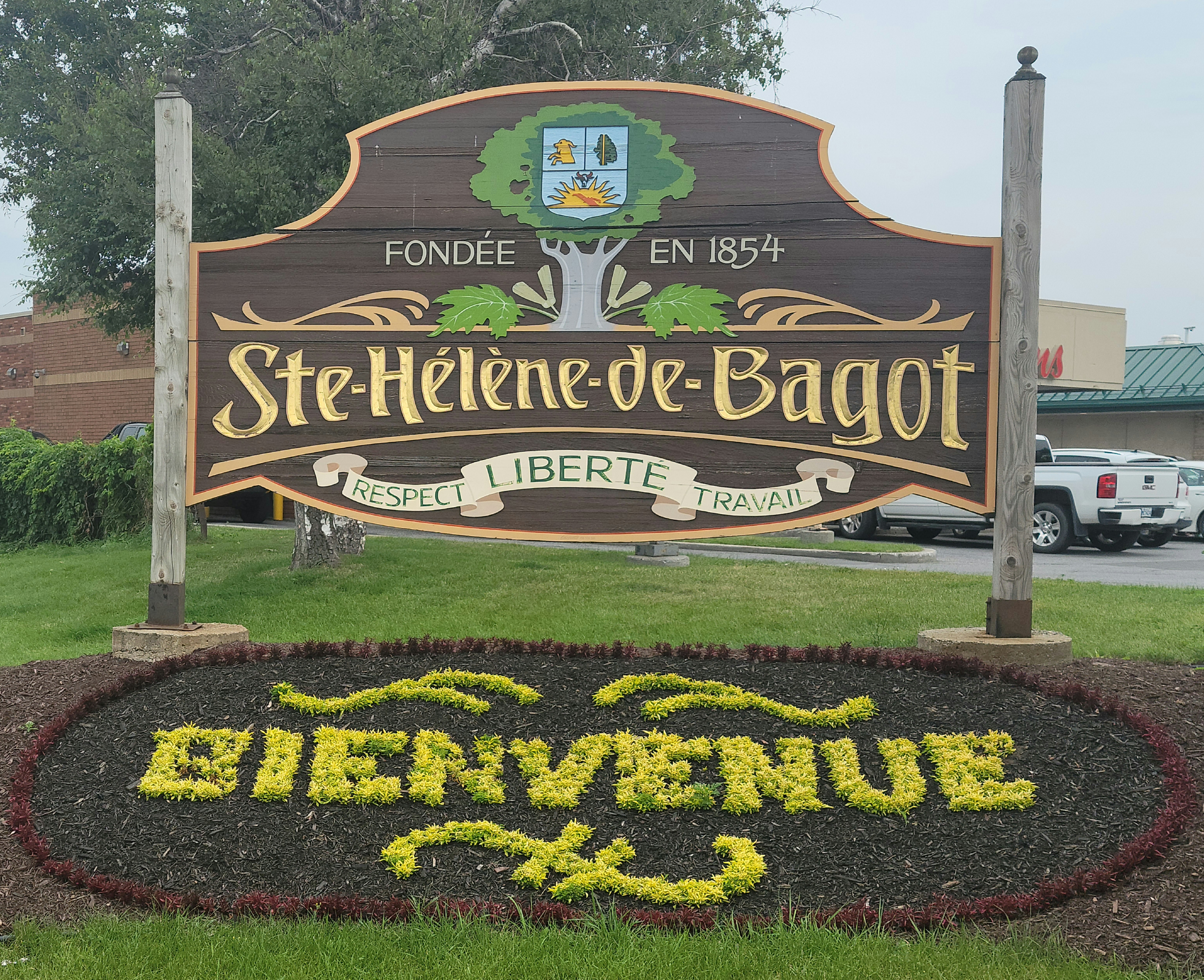
Welcome panel for the village of Sainte-Hélène-de-Bagot in 2022

== History ==
This municipality was born from the merger, in 1977, of the parish municipality of Sainte-Hélène, founded in 1855, and the village municipality of Sainte-Hélène-de-Bagot, founded in 1925.

== Geography ==
Sainte-Hélène-de-Bagot is located between Saint-Hyacinthe and Drummondville and is crossed by the Highway 20 - Jean-Lesage, the village on one side and the land on the other.

Its location allowed, in the 1970s, with the construction of a highway between Montreal and Quebec, to become a stopover village. Several restaurants and service stations are present in this locality of 1500 inhabitants. According to the Ministry of Transport of Quebec, more than 1000 trucks a day stop in this small village.

The municipality was once part of County of Bagot. It is now part of the provincial riding of Daniel-Johnson.

== Demographics ==
=== Population ===
Canada census – Sainte-Hélène-de-Bagot community profile

	2021	2011
Population	1,696 (+0.5% from 2016)	1,637 (+13.2% from 2006)
Land area	72.41 km^{2} (27.96 sq mi)	73.42 km^{2} (28.35 sq mi)
Population density	23.4/km^{2} (61/sq mi)	22.3/km^{2} (58/sq mi)
Median age	39.2 (M: 38.8, F: 39.6)	36.0 (M: 36.6, F: 34.7)
Private dwellings	715 (total)	701 (total)
Median household income		$55,586

References: 2021 2011

Historical Census Data - Sainte-Hélène-de-Bagot, Quebec

Year	Pop.	±%
1991	1,478	—
1996	1,495	+1.2%

Year	Pop.	±%
2001	1,521	+1.7%
2006	1,446	−4.9%

Year	Pop.	±%
2011	1,637	+13.2%

=== Language ===
Canada Census Mother Tongue - Sainte-Hélène-de-Bagot, Quebec
Census	Total	French			English			French & English			Other		
Year	Responses	Count	Trend	Pop %	Count	Trend	Pop %	Count	Trend	Pop %	Count	Trend	Pop %
2011	1,630	1,600	▲15.5%	98.16%	10	▲ n/a%	0.61%	5	▲ n/a%	0.31%	15	▼72.7%	0.92%
2006	1,440	1,385	▼6.1%	96.18%	0	0.0%	0.00%	0	0.0%	0.00%	55	▲83.3%	3.82%
2001	1,505	1,475	▲0.3%	98.01%	0	0.0%	0.00%	0	0.0%	0.00%	30	▲ n/a%	1.99%
1996	1,470	1,470	n/a	100.00%	0	n/a	0.00%	0	n/a	0.00%	0	n/a	0.00%

== See also ==
- List of municipalities in Quebec
