= Saint-Marcel-de-Richelieu =

- Municipality
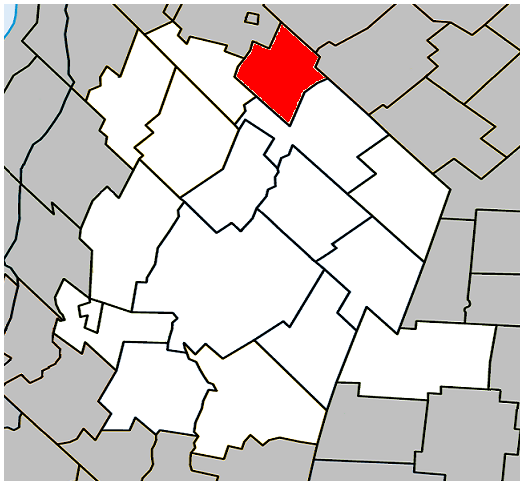
- Location within Les Maskoutains RCM.

- Location in southern Quebec.
- Coordinates: 45°52′N 72°54′W
- Country: Canada
- Province: Quebec
- Region: Montérégie
- RCM: Les Maskoutains
- Constituted: July 1, 1855

Government
  - Mayor: Mélanie Hardy
  - Federal riding: Saint-Hyacinthe—Bagot—Acton
  - Prov. riding: Richelieu

Area
  - Total: 51.40 km^{2} (19.85 sq mi)
  - Land: 51.27 km^{2} (19.80 sq mi)

Population (2021)
  - Total: 507
  - Density: 9.9/km^{2} (26/sq mi)
  - Pop 2016-2021: ▲2%
  - Dwellings: 225
- Time zone: UTC−5 (EST)
  - Summer (DST): UTC−4 (EDT)
- Postal code(s): J0H 1T0
- Area codes: 450 and 579
- Highways: R-239
- Website: www.saintmarcel derichelieu.ca

Saint-Marcel-de-Richelieu (French pronunciation: [sɛ̃ maʁsɛl də ʁiʃ(ə)ljø]) is a municipality in southwestern Quebec, Canada in the Regional County Municipality of Les Maskoutains. The population as of the Canada 2021 Census was 507.

== Demographics ==
=== Population ===
Canada census – Saint-Marcel-de-Richelieu community profile

	2021	2011
Population	507 (+2.0% from 2016)	543 (-6.4% from 2006)
Land area	51.27 km^{2} (19.80 sq mi)	50.93 km^{2} (19.66 sq mi)
Population density	9.9/km^{2} (26/sq mi)	10.7/km^{2} (28/sq mi)
Median age	41.2 (M: 42.8, F: 39.6)	40.4 (M: 42.2, F: 37.7)
Private dwellings	210 (total)	242 (total)
Median household income		$.N/A

Notes: 2011 income data for this area has been suppressed for data quality or confidentiality reasons.
References: 2021 2011

Historical Census Data - Saint-Marcel-de-Richelieu, Quebec

Year	Pop.	±%
1991	613	—
1996	619	+1.0%
2001	629	+1.6%

Year	Pop.	±%
2006	580	−7.8%
2011	543	−6.4%
2016	497	−8.5%

Year	Pop.	±%
2021	507	+2.0%

=== Language ===
Canada Census Mother Tongue - Saint-Marcel-de-Richelieu, Quebec
Census	Total	French			English			French & English			Other		
Year	Responses	Count	Trend	Pop %	Count	Trend	Pop %	Count	Trend	Pop %	Count	Trend	Pop %
2011	545	530	▼7.8%	97.25%	5	▲ n/a%	0.92%	5	▲ n/a%	0.92%	5	▲ n/a%	0.92%
2006	575	575	▼8.7%	100.00%	0	0.0%	0.00%	0	0.0%	0.00%	0	0.0%	0.00%
2001	630	630	▲1.6%	100.00%	0	0.0%	0.00%	0	0.0%	0.00%	0	0.0%	0.00%
1996	620	620	n/a	100.00%	0	n/a	0.00%	0	n/a	0.00%	0	n/a	0.00%

== Communities ==
- Saint-Marcel
- Lanoieville

== See also ==
- List of municipalities in Quebec
