= Saint-Barnabé-Sud =

- Municipality
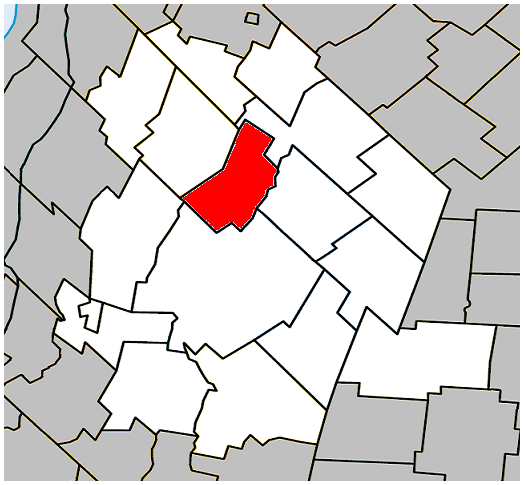
- Location within Les Maskoutains RCM.

- Location in southern Quebec.
- Coordinates: 45°44′N 72°55′W
- Country: Canada
- Province: Quebec
- Region: Montérégie
- RCM: Les Maskoutains
- Constituted: July 1, 1855

Government
  - Mayor: Nathalie Leblanc
  - Federal riding: Saint-Hyacinthe—Bagot—Acton
  - Prov. riding: Saint-Hyacinthe

Area
  - Total: 58.10 km^{2} (22.43 sq mi)
  - Land: 57.20 km^{2} (22.09 sq mi)

Population (2021)
  - Total: 962
  - Density: 16.8/km^{2} (44/sq mi)
  - Pop 2016-2021: ▲11.7%
  - Dwellings: 389
- Time zone: UTC−05:00 (EST)
  - Summer (DST): UTC−04:00 (EDT)
- Postal code(s): J0H 1G0
- Area codes: 450 and 579
- Highways: R-235

Saint-Barnabé-Sud (French pronunciation: [sɛ̃ baʁnabe syd]) is a municipality in southwestern Quebec in the Regional County Municipality of Les Maskoutains. The population as of the 2021 Canadian Census was 962. It is the birthplace of historian Jean-Baptiste-Arthur Allaire.

== Demographics ==
=== Population ===
Canada census – Saint-Barnabé-Sud community profile

	2021	2016	2011
Population	962 (+11.7% from 2016)	861 (+0.2% from 2011)	859 (-0.6% from 2006)
Land area	57.20 km^{2} (22.09 sq mi)	57.22 km^{2} (22.09 sq mi)	57.40 km^{2} (22.16 sq mi)
Population density	16.8/km^{2} (44/sq mi)	15.0/km^{2} (39/sq mi)	15.0/km^{2} (39/sq mi)
Median age	40.4 (M: 41.2, F: 39.2)	39.7 (M: 39.6, F: 39.7)	40.2 (M: 40.2, F: 40.1)
Private dwellings	389 (total)	346 (total)	346 (total)
Median household income	$81,000	$66,901	$55,141

References: 2021 2016 2011

Historical Census Data - Saint-Barnabé-Sud, Quebec

Year	Pop.	±%
1991	880	—
1996	902	+2.5%
2001	884	−2.0%

Year	Pop.	±%
2006	864	−2.3%
2011	859	−0.6%
2016	861	+0.2%

Year	Pop.	±%
2021	962	+11.7%

=== Language ===
Canada Census Mother Tongue - Saint-Barnabé-Sud, Quebec
Census	Total	French			English			French & English			Other		
Year	Responses	Count	Trend	Pop %	Count	Trend	Pop %	Count	Trend	Pop %	Count	Trend	Pop %
2021	965	920	▲9.5%	95.3%	10	▲100.0%	1.0%	5	▼50.0%	0.5%	15	▲200.0%	1.6%
2016	860	840	0.0%	97.7%	5	▼50.0%	0.6%	10	▲ n/a%	1.2%	5	▲ n/a%	0.6%
2011	850	840	▼2.9%	98.8%	10	▲ n/a%	1.2%	0	0.0%	0.0%	0	0.0%	0.0%
2006	865	865	0.0%	100.0%	0	▼100.0%	0.0%	0	▼100.0%	0.0%	0	▼100.0%	0.0%
2001	895	865	0.0%	96.7%	10	▼50.0%	1.1%	10	▲ n/a%	1.1%	10	▲ n/a%	1.1%
1996	885	865	n/a	97.7%	20	n/a	2.3%	0	n/a	0.0%	0	n/a	0.0%

== Communities ==
- Saint-Barnabé-Sud

== Death of infant, 2010 ==
On June 7, 2010, police reported that a 20-day-old infant in Saint-Barnabé-Sud had been killed by a dog, a Siberian Husky, that afternoon.

== See also ==
- List of municipalities in Quebec
