= Saint-Valérien-de-Milton =

- Municipality
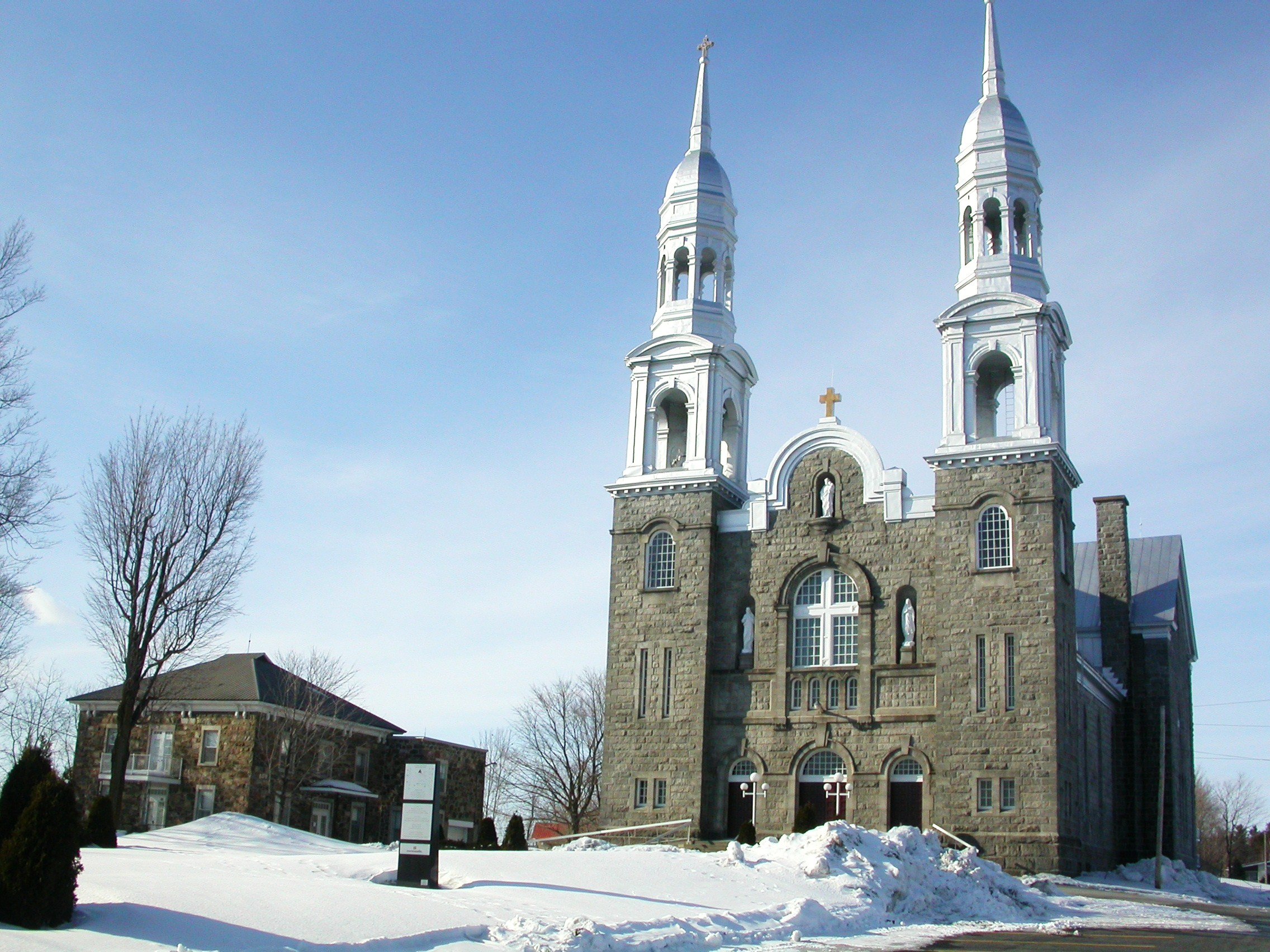

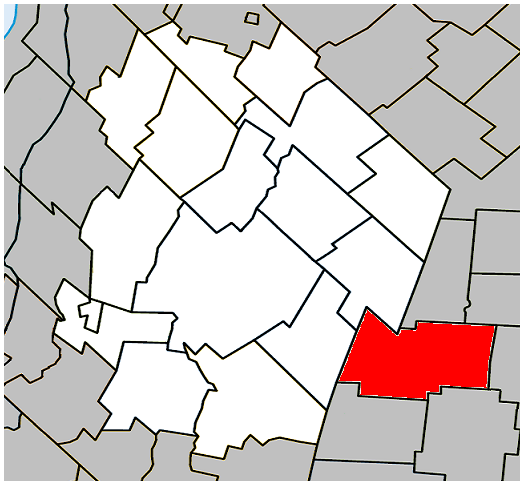
- Location within Les Maskoutains RCM

- Location in southern Quebec
- Coordinates: 45°34′N 72°43′W
- Country: Canada
- Province: Quebec
- Region: Montérégie
- RCM: Les Maskoutains
- Constituted: January 1, 1864

Government
  - Mayor: Rémi Tétreault
  - Federal riding: Saint-Hyacinthe—Bagot—Acton
  - Prov. riding: Daniel-Johnson

Area
  - Total: 107.70 km^{2} (41.58 sq mi)
  - Land: 106.92 km^{2} (41.28 sq mi)

Population (2021)
  - Total: 1,767
  - Density: 16.5/km^{2} (43/sq mi)
  - Pop 2016-2021: ▼1.5%
  - Dwellings: 751
- Time zone: UTC−5 (EST)
  - Summer (DST): UTC−4 (EDT)
- Postal code(s): J0H 2B0
- Area codes: 450 and 579
- Highways: R-211
- Website: www.st-valerien- de-milton.qc.ca

Saint-Valérien-de-Milton (French pronunciation: [sɛ̃t valeʁjɛ̃ də miltən]) is a municipality in the Canadian province of Quebec, located within Les Maskoutains Regional County Municipality. The population as of the Canada 2021 Census was 1,767.

== Demographics ==
=== Population ===
Canada census – Saint-Valérien-de-Milton community profile

	2021	2011
Population	1,767 (-1.5% from 2016)	1,840 (+7.1% from 2006)
Land area	106.92 km^{2} (41.28 sq mi)	107.36 km^{2} (41.45 sq mi)
Population density	16.5/km^{2} (43/sq mi)	17.1/km^{2} (44/sq mi)
Median age	41.6 (M: 42.4, F: 40.8)	38.6 (M: 40.3, F: 36.3)
Private dwellings	705 (total)	731 (total)
Median household income	$80,000	$60,936

References: 2021 2011

Historical Census Data - Saint-Valérien-de-Milton, Quebec

Year	Pop.	±%
1871	1,293	—
1881	1,806	+39.7%
1891	1,906	+5.5%
1901	1,795	−5.8%
1911	1,703	−5.1%
1921	1,421	−16.6%
1931	1,337	−5.9%
1941	1,317	−1.5%

Year	Pop.	±%
1951	1,195	−9.3%
1956	1,231	+3.0%
1961	1,237	+0.5%
1966	1,269	+2.6%
1971	1,368	+7.8%
1976	1,433	+4.8%
1981	1,665	+16.2%
1986	1,711	+2.8%

Year	Pop.	±%
1991	1,767	+3.3%
1996	1,776	+0.5%
2001	1,775	−0.1%
2006	1,718	−3.2%
2011	1,840	+7.1%
2016	1,793	−2.6%
2021	1,767	−1.5%

=== Language ===
Canada Census Mother Tongue - Saint-Valérien-de-Milton, Quebec
Census	Total	French			English			French & English			Other		
Year	Responses	Count	Trend	Pop %	Count	Trend	Pop %	Count	Trend	Pop %	Count	Trend	Pop %
2011	1,835	1,815	▲10.7%	98.91%	10	▼71.4%	0.54%	5	▼50.0%	0.27%	5	▼80.0%	0.27%
2006	1,710	1,640	▼5.7%	95.91%	35	▲40.0%	2.05%	10	▲ n/a%	0.58%	25	▲150.0%	1.46%
2001	1,775	1,740	▼1.7%	98.03%	25	▲150.0%	1.41%	0	0.0%	0.00%	10	▲ n/a%	0.56%
1996	1,780	1,770	n/a	99.44%	10	n/a	0.56%	0	n/a	0.00%	0	n/a	0.00%

== See also ==
- List of municipalities in Quebec
