= Saint-Dominique =

- Municipality
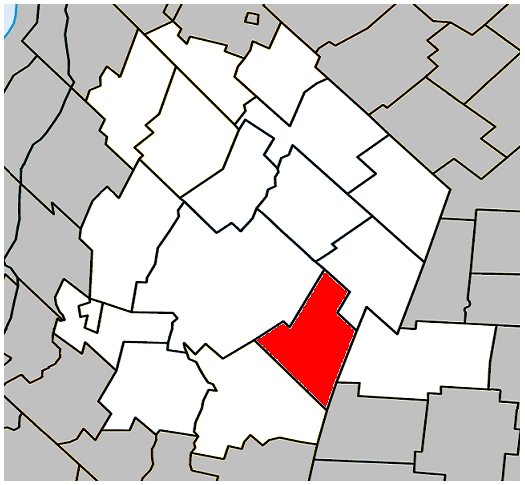
- Location within Les Maskoutains RCM.

- Location in southern Quebec.
- Coordinates: 45°34′N 72°51′W
- Country: Canada
- Province: Quebec
- Region: Montérégie
- RCM: Les Maskoutains
- Constituted: July 19, 1969

Government
  - Mayor: Hugo McDermott
  - Federal riding: Saint-Hyacinthe—Bagot—Acton
  - Prov. riding: Daniel-Johnson

Area
  - Total: 71.10 km^{2} (27.45 sq mi)
  - Land: 70.53 km^{2} (27.23 sq mi)

Population (2021)
  - Total: 2,741
  - Density: 38.9/km^{2} (101/sq mi)
  - Pop 2016-2021: ▲7.4%
  - Dwellings: 1,119
- Time zone: UTC−5 (EST)
  - Summer (DST): UTC−4 (EDT)
- Postal code(s): J0H 1L0
- Area codes: 450 and 579
- Highways: R-137
- Website: www.municipalite. saint-dominique.qc.ca

Saint-Dominique (French pronunciation: [sɛ̃ dɔminik]) is a municipality in the Montérégie region of southwestern Quebec. The population as of the Canada 2021 Census was 2,741.

== Demographics ==
=== Population ===
Canada census – Saint-Dominique community profile

	2021	2016	2011
Population	2,741 (+7.4% from 2016)	2,553 (+9.7% from 2011)	2,327 (+9.1% from 2006)
Land area	70.53 km^{2} (27.23 sq mi)	70.48 km^{2} (27.21 sq mi)	69.08 km^{2} (26.67 sq mi)
Population density	38.9/km^{2} (101/sq mi)	36.2/km^{2} (94/sq mi)	33.7/km^{2} (87/sq mi)
Median age	37.2 (M: 37.6, F: 36.8)	36.3 (M: 36, F: 36.8)	37.1 (M: 37.5, F: 36.9)
Private dwellings	1,090 (total)	1,009 (total)	943 (total)
Median household income	$84,000	$68,864	$61,438

References: 2021 2016 2011

Historical Census Data - Saint-Dominique, Quebec

Year	Pop.	±%
1971	1,722	—
1976	1,772	+2.9%
1981	2,068	+16.7%
1986	2,041	−1.3%

Year	Pop.	±%
1991	2,103	+3.0%
1996	2,236	+6.3%
2001	2,231	−0.2%
2006	2,132	−4.4%

Year	Pop.	±%
2011	2,327	+9.1%
2016	2,553	+9.7%
2021	2,741	+7.4%

=== Language ===
Canada Census Mother Tongue - Saint-Dominique, Quebec
Census	Total	French			English			French & English			Other		
Year	Responses	Count	Trend	Pop %	Count	Trend	Pop %	Count	Trend	Pop %	Count	Trend	Pop %
2021	2,740	2,645	▲6.4%	96.5%	20	0.0%	0.7%	10	▲100.0%	0.4%	55	▲37.5%	2.0%
2016	2,555	2,485	▲9.0%	97.3%	20	0.0%	0.8%	5	▼50.0%	0.2%	40	▲166.7%	1.6%
2011	2,325	2,280	▲9.9%	98.1%	20	0.0%	0.9%	10	0.0%	0.4%	15	▲50.0%	0.7%
2006	2,115	2,075	▼5.5%	98.1%	20	▼20.0%	1.0%	10	▲ n/a%	0.5%	10	▲ n/a%	0.5%
2001	2,220	2,195	▼0.9%	98.9%	25	▲150.0%	1.1%	0	0.0%	0.0%	0	▼100.0%	0.0%
1996	2,245	2,215	n/a	98.7%	10	n/a	0.5%	0	n/a	0.0%	20	n/a	0.9%

== See also ==
- List of municipalities in Quebec
