= Saint-Simon, Québec =

Saint-Simon
- Municipality
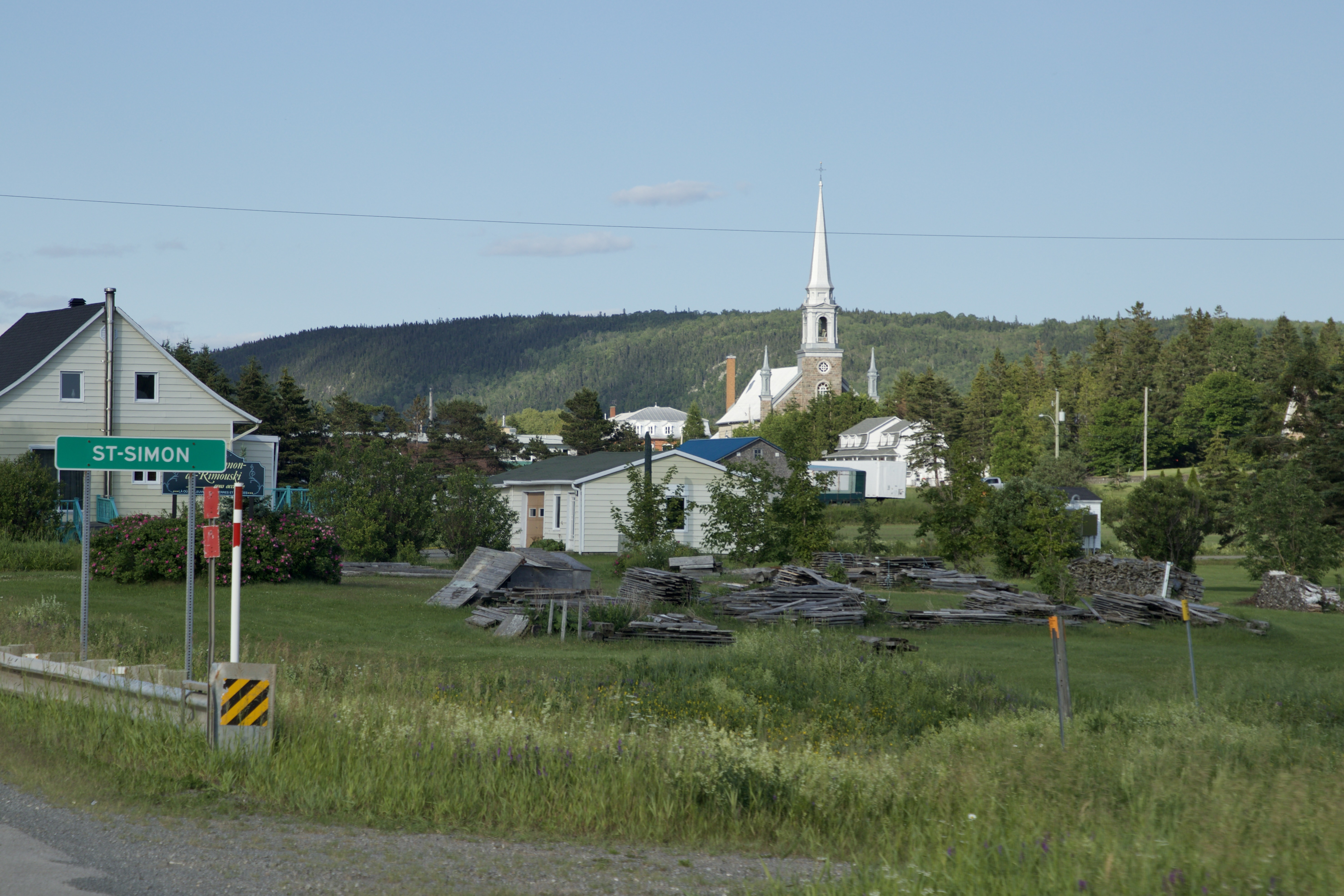

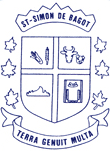
- Coat of arms

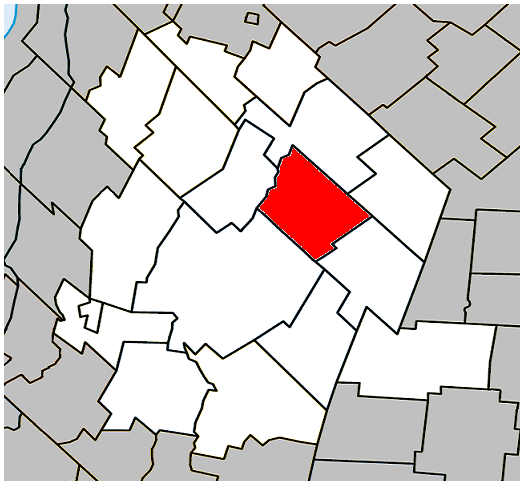
- Location within Les Maskoutains RCM

- Location in southern Quebec
- Coordinates: 45°44′N 72°52′W
- Country: Canada
- Province: Quebec
- Region: Montérégie
- RCM: Les Maskoutains
- Constituted: July 1, 1855

Government
  - Mayor: Simon Giard
  - Federal riding: Saint-Hyacinthe—Bagot—Acton
  - Prov. riding: Saint-Hyacinthe

Area
  - Total: 69.90 km^{2} (26.99 sq mi)
  - Land: 69.07 km^{2} (26.67 sq mi)

Population (2016)
  - Total: 1,413
  - Density: 20.5/km^{2} (53/sq mi)
  - Pop 2011-2016: ▲14.8%
  - Dwellings: 546
- Time zone: UTC−5 (EST)
  - Summer (DST): UTC−4 (EDT)
- Postal code(s): J0H 1Y0
- Area codes: 450 and 579
- Highways A-20 (TCH): R-116; R-211; R-224
- Website: www.saint-simon.ca

Saint-Simon (French pronunciation: [sɛ̃ simɔ̃]) is a municipality in southwestern Quebec, Canada on the Yamaska River in Les Maskoutains Regional County Municipality. The population as of the Canada 2016 Census was 1,413.

== Demographics ==
=== Population ===
Canada census – Saint-Simon community profile

	2021	2016	2011
Population	1,386 (-1.9% from 2016)	1,413 (+14.8% from 2011)	1,231 (+0.2% from 2006)
Land area	69.05 km^{2} (26.66 sq mi)	69.07 km^{2} (26.67 sq mi)	68.99 km^{2} (26.64 sq mi)
Population density	20.1/km^{2} (52/sq mi)	20.5/km^{2} (53/sq mi)	17.8/km^{2} (46/sq mi)
Median age	38.8 (M: 39.2, F: 38)	36.6 (M: 37.2, F: 36.0)	38.7 (M: 38.6, F: 38.8)
Private dwellings	540 (total)	546 (total)	489 (total)
Median household income		$69,163	$57,023

References: 2021 2016 2011

Historical Census Data - Saint-Simon, Montérégie, Quebec
Year	Pop.	±%
1991	1,203	—
1996	1,168	−2.9%
2001	1,118	−4.3%
2006	1,228	+9.8%
2011	1,231	+0.2%
2016	1,413	+14.8%

=== Language ===
Canada Census Mother Tongue - Saint-Simon, Montérégie, Quebec
Census	Total	French			English			French & English			Other		
Year	Responses	Count	Trend	Pop %	Count	Trend	Pop %	Count	Trend	Pop %	Count	Trend	Pop %
2016	1,390	1,365	▲13.3%	98.2%	5	▼50.0%	0.4%	0	0.0%	0.0%	15	▲50.0%	1.1%
2011	1,225	1,205	▲2.1%	98.37%	10	▲ n/a%	0.82%	0	0.0%	0.00%	10	▼66.7%	0.82%
2006	1,210	1,180	▲7.3%	97.52%	0	▼100.0%	0.00%	0	0.0%	0.00%	30	▲100.0%	2.48%
2001	1,125	1,100	▲1.4%	97.78%	10	▲ n/a%	0.89%	0	0.0%	0.00%	15	▼80.0%	1.33%
1996	1,160	1,085	n/a	93.53%	0	n/a	0.00%	0	n/a	0.00%	75	n/a	6.47%

== Communities ==
- Clairveaux-de-Bagot
- Saint-Georges-de-Bagot
- Saint-Simon-de-Bagot

== See also ==
- List of municipalities in Quebec
