= Quebec Route 239 =

Highway in Quebec, Canada

Route 239

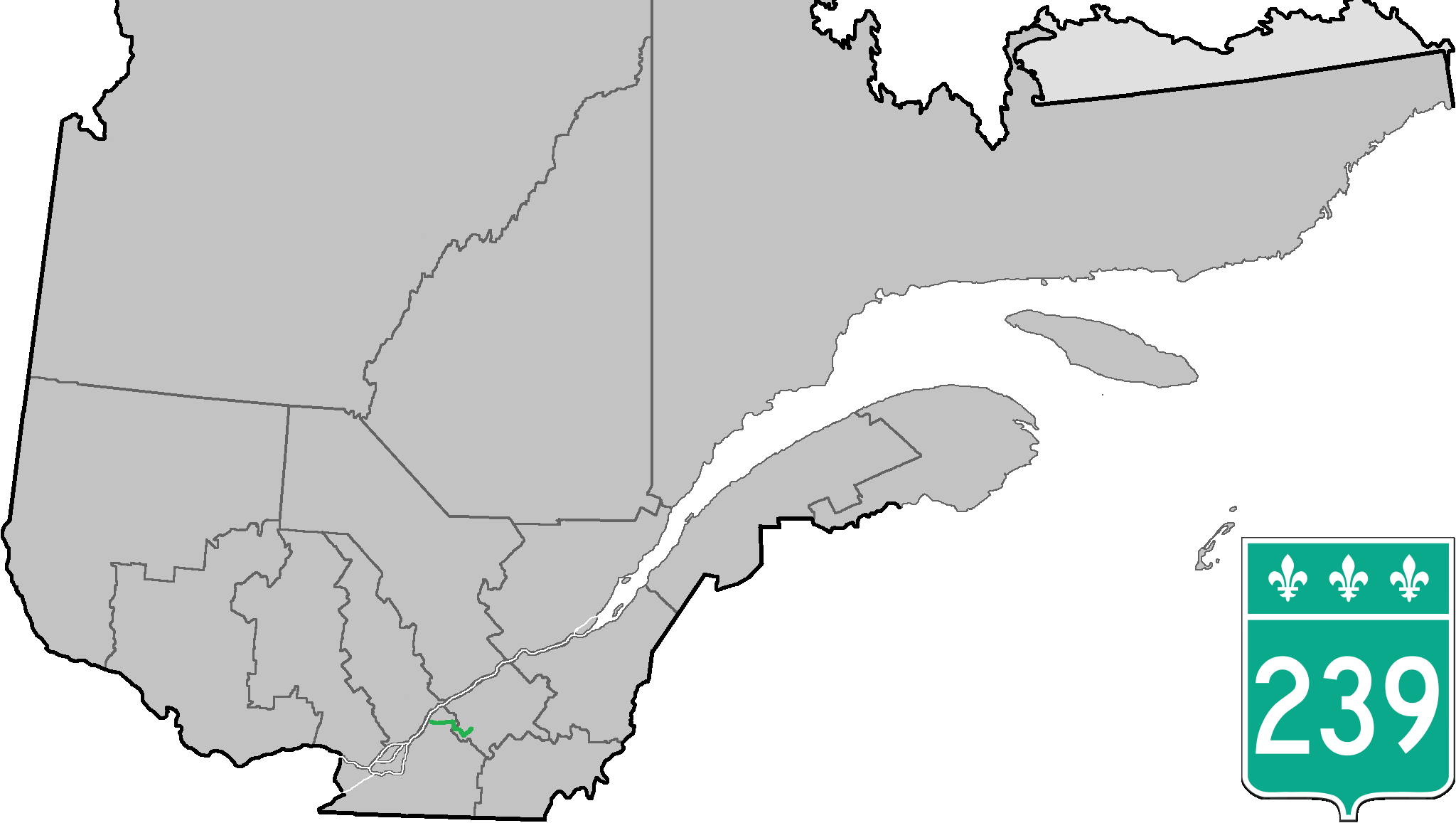

Route information
- Maintained by Transports Québec
- Length: 63.3 km (39.3 mi)

Major junctions
- South end: R-122 in Saint-Germain-de-Grantham
- A-20 (TCH) in Saint-Eugène
- North end: R-133 in Sainte-Victoire-de-Sorel

Location
- Country: Canada
- Province: Quebec

Highway system
- Quebec provincial highways; Autoroutes; List; Former
← R-237	→ R-241

Route 239 is a north–south highway on the south shore of the Saint Lawrence River, in the Montérégie and Centre-du-Québec regions. Its northern terminus is at Route 133 in Sainte-Victoire-de-Sorel and its southern terminus is at Saint-Germain-de-Grantham at the junction of Route 122.

== Municipalities along Route 239 ==
- Saint-Germain-de-Grantham
- Saint-Eugène
- Saint-Guillaume
- Saint-Marcel-de-Richelieu
- Massueville
- Sainte-Victoire-de-Sorel

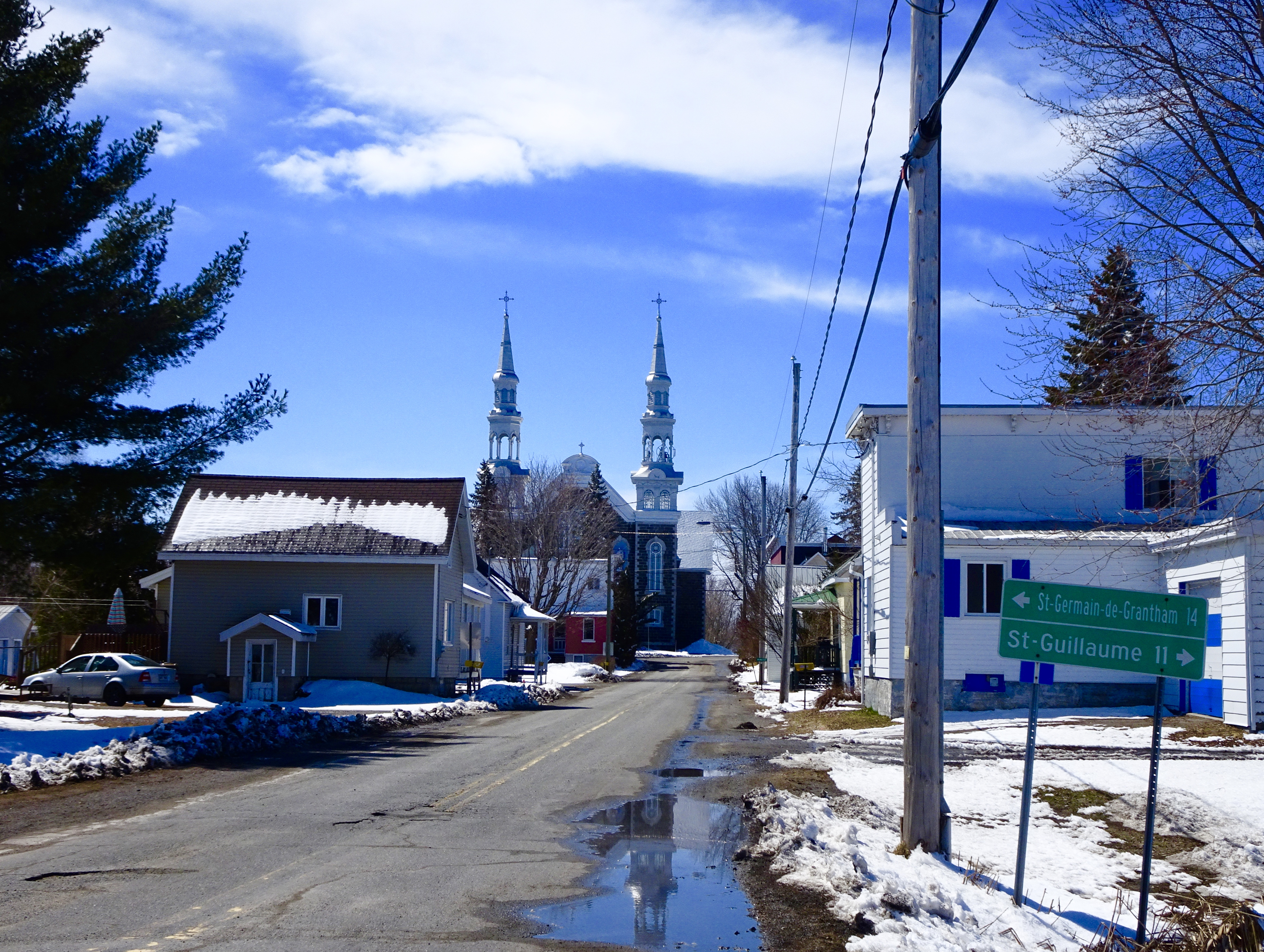
Approaching the intersection of Route 239 (rang de l'Église) and Route des Loisirs in Saint-Eugène.

== See also ==
- List of Quebec provincial highways
