= Beloeil, Quebec =

Belœil
- City
- Ville de Beloeil
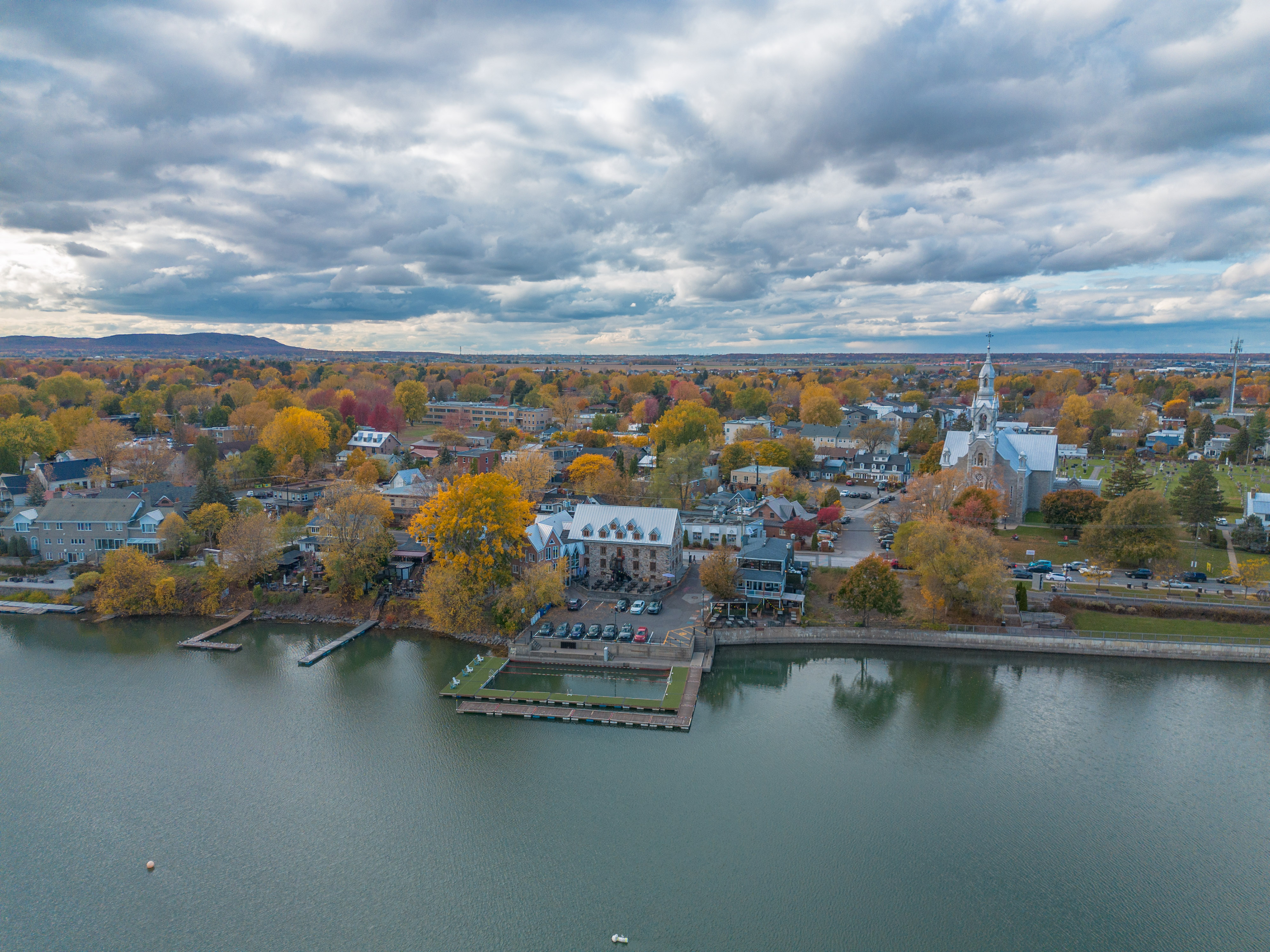
- Beloeil in 2025

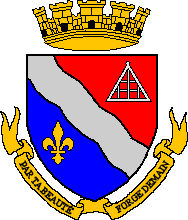
- Coat of arms
- Motto: Par ta beauté forge demain (By thy beauty shape tomorrow)
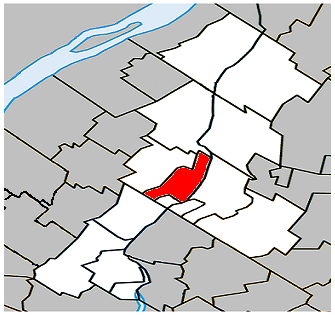
- Location within La Vallée-du-Richelieu RCM

- Location in southern Quebec
- Coordinates: 45°34′N 73°12′W
- Country: Canada
- Province: Quebec
- Region: Montérégie
- RCM: La Vallée-du-Richelieu
- Constituted: December 9, 1903

Government
  - Mayor: Daniel Picard
  - Federal riding: Beloeil—Chambly
  - Prov. riding: Borduas

Area
  - City: 25.50 km^{2} (9.85 sq mi)
  - Land: 24.38 km^{2} (9.41 sq mi)
  - Urban: 26.50 km^{2} (10.23 sq mi)
- Elevation: 14 m (46 ft)

Population (2021)
  - City: 24,104
  - Density: 988.8/km^{2} (2,561/sq mi)
  - Urban: 52,959
  - Urban density: 1,998.5/km^{2} (5,176/sq mi)
  - Pop 2016-2021: ▲7.3%
  - Dwellings: 10,338
- Time zone: UTC−5 (EST)
  - Summer (DST): UTC−4 (EDT)
- Postal code(s): J3G
- Area codes: 450 and 579
- Highways A-20 (TCH): R-116; R-223; R-229
- Website: beloeil.ca

Beloeil (/bɛˈlaɪl/; French pronunciation: [bɛlœj]) is a city in Quebec, Canada. It is a suburb of Montreal, on the South Shore and is on the Richelieu River, 32 kilometres (20 mi) east of Montreal. According to the official Commission de toponymie du Québec, the name is written Belœil with an oe ligature; however, other sources avoid the ligature, including the Ministry of Municipal Affairs and the town's own official website.

The population as of the Canada 2021 Census was 24,107. It is part of the Regional County Municipality of La Vallée-du-Richelieu, within the Administrative Region of Montérégie. It occupies the west shore of the Richelieu River in front of the Mont Saint-Hilaire. Along with the city of McMasterville to the immediate south of Beloeil, and the cities of Mont-Saint-Hilaire and Otterburn Park on the eastern bank of the Richelieu, Beloeil forms an unbroken urban area of over 52,959 inhabitants, which is part of Greater Montreal.

Belœil was created as a village in 1903 and became a ville (city) in 1914, but can trace its history through the parish of Saint-Mathieu-de-Belœil, established in 1772, and the seigneurie de Belœil, founded in 1694. Its name probably derives from the old French expression "Quel bel œil!", meaning "What a beautiful view!", generally attributed to Jean-Baptiste Hertel, brother of the first seigneur (lord) of Belœil, Joseph-François Hertel de la Fresnière.

== History ==
Although there has been evidence found of a prior indigenous peoples' presence along the Richelieu River, none of it has been found on the territory of Beloeil. Development of the region in the first several decades after the arrival of Europeans in the region was slow, owing to the geographic situation of the Richelieu, which made it a primary avenue of attack from New York toward New France.

The recorded history of Belœil began on 18 January 1694 when Governor Louis de Buade de Frontenac granted Joseph Hertel a seigneurie along the shores of the Richelieu River, which Hertel called the Seigneurie de Belœil. Hertel, unwilling to abandon his military activities, such as the 1704 Raid on Deerfield, never developed the seigneurie, and sold it in 1711 to Charles le Moyne de Longueuil, Baron de Longueuil, whose seigneurie of Longueuil neighboured that of Belœil. Finally, after failed attempts in 1711 and 1723, permanent settlement began in 1725, with dwellers coming mostly from the island of Montreal or from seigneuries along the Saint Lawrence River near Montreal. The low level of development forced local inhabitants to rely on the mission at Fort Chambly, several hours to the south, for their religious needs, and the first mill did not open until the early 1760s.

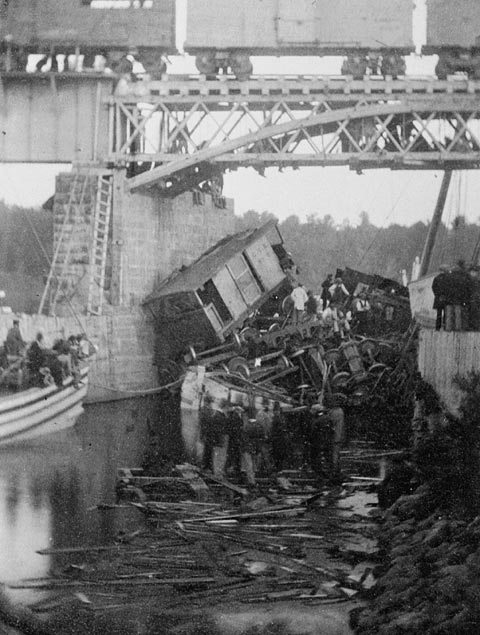
On 29 June 1864, the worst train disaster in the history of Canada killed 99 on the bridge between Mont-Saint-Hilaire and Belœil-Station

By 1768, however, the local population had grown to the point where a request to the Bishop of Quebec for the establishment of a mission was successful. In 1772, a presbytery-chapel was completed, and the registry of the parish of Saint-Mathieu-de-Belœil, was opened. The parish received its first resident priest the next year, then, in 1775, François Noiseux became local priest and, under his guidance and with his financing, the parish would build its first church from 1784 to 1787. The parish was canonically erected in 1832 and, after the first half of the nineteenth century saw the growth of a small hamlet around the church, became a parish municipality in 1855. The Saint-Mathieu Church burned and was rebuilt twice (in 1817 and 1895); the third one still stands.

Meanwhile, on 28 December 1848, the portion of the St. Lawrence and Atlantic Railroad linking Montreal to Saint-Hyacinthe opened, passing about two kilometres (1.2 mi) south of the church. A station was built, and a second hamlet, Belœil-Station, soon grew around it. This second hamlet attracted upper-class vacationers from Montreal, who built summer homes along the Richelieu river with views of the mountain. The railway bridge between Belœil-Station and Mont-Saint-Hilaire was, in 1864, the site of the worst train disaster in the history of Canada when a passenger train plunged off the open bridge into the Richelieu river, killing 99. In 1878, industrialization began in Belœil when the Hamilton Powder Company established an explosives factory a little to the south of Belœil-Station, in what would eventually become McMasterville.

In 1903, the two hamlets (around the Church and Belœil-Station), dissatisfied with the aqueduct service in the parish municipality of Saint-Mathieu-de-Belœil, requested and were granted permission to become the village of Belœil, whose population reached nearly 700 inhabitants in 1911. By 1914, the village had grown further, sufficiently so to become the ville (city) of Belœil. Over these early years, the city developed its aqueduct and electricity networks. The city remained largely isolated from Montreal, except by train, owing to poorly organized road connections. The opening, in 1940, of the then-Route 9, today Quebec route 116, provided a first direct link to Montreal and, by the 1950s, the population had grown to nearly 6,000 inhabitants, and the two hamlets had grown into a single town. The construction, in 1964, of the Quebec Autoroute 20 freeway linking Montreal to Quebec and passing just north of Beloeil, the population of Beloeil tripled over the next three decades as it became part of the Montreal suburbs.

=== Name ===
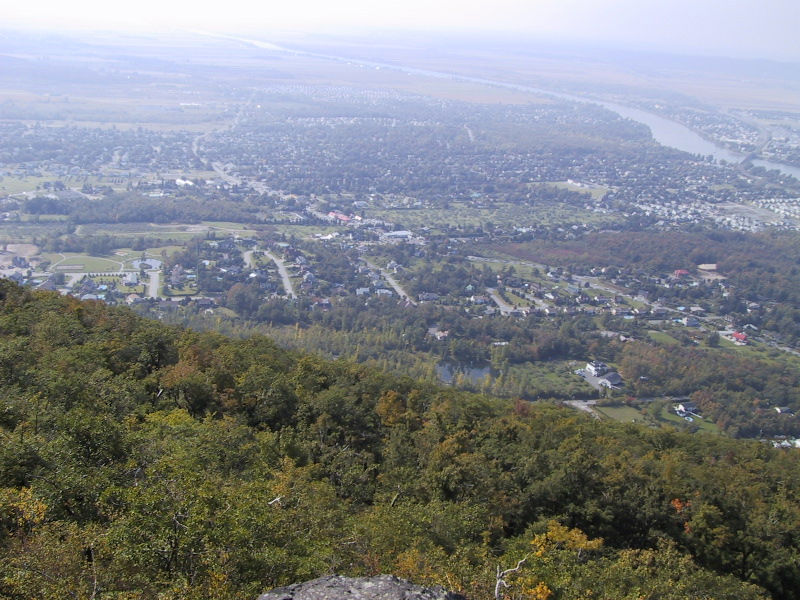
The view from atop Mont Saint-Hilaire, which is probably the origin of the name, Belœil.

The origins of the name Belœil have been a matter of debate between two competing theories.

One theory argues that the city derives its name from the view from atop the Mont Saint-Hilaire. According to this theory, in 1693, shortly before receiving the seigneurie from Frontenac, Joseph Hertel and his brother Jean-Baptiste climbed atop the Mont Saint-Hilaire, where, upon seeing the view, Jean-Baptiste Hertel exclaimed "Quel bel œil!", which, in seventeenth-century French, meant "What a beautiful view!". According to this theory, when he was later granted his seigneurie, Joseph Hertel, remembering the exclamation, chose to name it Belœil (beautiful view). The alternate theory states that the name derives from the like-named town in Belgium, with a wide variety of possible links between the two towns.

While city government of Beloeil refuses to take a position in the debate on the origin of the name, local historian Pierre Lambert has demonstrated that the various proposed links between the Belgian and Quebec cities are very tenuous at best, whereas the "Bel Œil" theory was first put forward by the Campbell family, who (having purchased the seigneurie of Rouville in the nineteenth century) had access to the archives of Jean-Baptiste Hertel. As a result, Lambert argues for "beautiful view" as the probable origin of the name.

== Geography ==
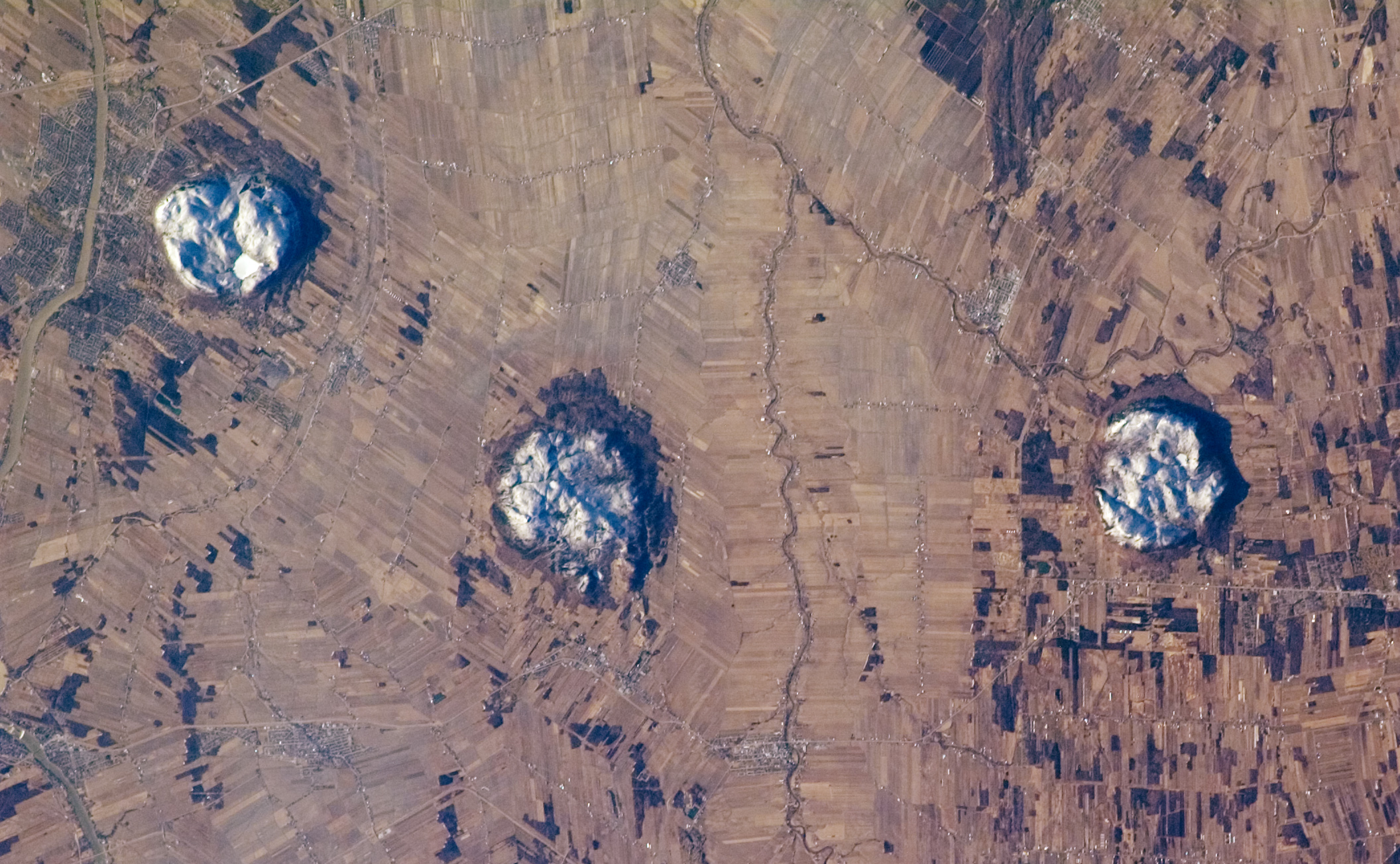
Part of southwestern Quebec, seen from the International Space Station. Beloeil and its neighboring towns are visible to the upper left, near the white mass of Mont Saint-Hilaire.

Beloeil lies in the central Saint Lawrence Lowlands, a plains region on both sides of the St. Lawrence River. The elevation above sea level near the city on the western shore of the Richelieu is lower than 30 metres (98 ft), with the Saint-Mathieu-de-Beloeil Aerodrome, at the western edge of town, lying 14 metres (46 ft) above mean sea level. Just across the Richelieu river, however, the isolated Mont Saint-Hilaire, which was known as Mount Belœil for most of the nineteenth century, dominates the regional landscape with its 414 metres (1,358 ft).

Generally, the region surrounding Beloeil remains agricultural. The Census Consolidated Subdivision of Saint-Mathieu-de-Beloeil, which includes Beloeil as well as McMasterville, has 33.7 square kilometres (13.0 sq mi) of farmlands, out of a total area of 67 square kilometres (26 sq mi), or 42.6%. The wider Vallée-du-Richelieu census district, of which Saint-Mathieu-de-Beloeil is part, has 391.6 square kilometres (151.2 sq mi) of farmland, out of 589 square kilometres (227 sq mi) total area, or 66.4%.

Beloeil is part of a broader agglomeration of over forty thousand inhabitants, formed by four towns spread out on the sides of the Richelieu River. It represents the northwestern portion of the agglomeration and is separated from Mont Saint-Hilaire (northeastern) and Otterburn Park (southeastern) only by the Richlieu river, while Bernard-Pilon street (Quebec Route 229) forms the limit between Beloeil and McMasterville (southwestern). Most of the urban portion of the city as it exists today lies within the area delimited by Bernard-Pilon Street to the south, the Richelieu river to the east, Yvon-L'Heureux Boulevard to the west, and Quebec Autoroute 20 to the north. The land north of the autoroute or west of Yvon-L'Heureux is still largely rural.

Historically, Belœil grew as two separate hamlets, one around the Saint-Mathieu-de-Belœil parish church and the other around the train station. Although the inland growth of the town starting in the 1950s has linked the two hamlets into a single city, the historical neighborhoods still exist, as the Vieux-Belœil (English "Old Belœil"), around the Saint-Mathieu Church at the meeting of the Richelieu and Saint-Jean-Baptiste streets, and Belœil-Station by the railway and along the shores of the river further south, although much of the territory of Belœil-Station seceded in 1917 to form the municipality of McMasterville.

== Demographics ==
In the 2021 Census of Population conducted by Statistics Canada, Beloeil had a population of 24,104 living in 10,140 of its 10,338 total private dwellings, a change of 7.3% from its 2016 population of 22,458. With a land area of 24.38 km^{2} (9.41 sq mi), it had a population density of 988.7 people/km^{2} (2,561 people/mi^{2}) in 2021. In the 2021 Census of Population conducted by Statistics Canada, Beloeil had a population of 24,104 living in 10,140 of its 10,338 total private dwellings, a change of 7.3% from its 2016 population of 22,458. With a land area of 24.38 km^{2} (9.41 sq mi), it had a population density of 988.7 people/km^{2} (2,561 people/mi^{2}) in 2021. In 2021, 82.9% of the population was 15 years of age or older and the median age was 42.0 years old (compared to Quebec's 86.1% and 43.2).

Canada census – Beloeil community profile

	2021	2016
Population	24,104 (+7.3% from 2016)	22,458 (+8.1% from 2011)
Land area	24.38 km^{2} (9.41 sq mi)	24.40 km^{2} (9.42 sq mi)
Population density	988.8/km^{2} (2,561/sq mi)	920.2/km^{2} (2,383/sq mi)
Median age	42.0 (M: 41.6, F: 42.8)	41.3 (M: 40.2, F: 42.6)
Private dwellings	10,338 (total) 10,140 (occupied)	9,273 (total)
Median household income	$90,000	$78,555

References: 2021 2016

In 2021, there were 7,075 households, of which 2,865 were couples (married or otherwise) with children, 3,155 were childless couples, and 2,920 were one-person households, with the balance being multiple-family households, one-parent family households and non-standard households. The average size of the Beloeil census family was 2.8 members.

In 2021, 6.3% of the population were first generation Canadians, while 5.6% were second generation. 4.5% of residents were visible minorities, 0.9% were Indigenous, and the remaining 94.6% were white/European. The largest visible minority groups were Black (1.9%) and Latin American (0.9%).

67.1% of residents were Christian, down from 86.7% in 2011. 60.4% were Catholic, 4.3% were Christian n.o.s, and 0.7% were Protestant. All other Christian denominations and Christian-related traditions made up 1.5% of the population. 31.5% of the population was non-religious or secular, up from 12.8% in 2011. The only named non-Christian religions with followers in Beloeil were Islam (0.9%) and Buddhism (0.3%). Only 0.1% of the population were believers in other religions or spiritual traditions.

Historical population

Year	Pop.	±%
1911	1,501	—
1921	1,418	−5.5%
1931	1,434	+1.1%
1941	2,008	+40.0%
1951	2,992	+49.0%
1956	3,966	+32.6%
1961	6,283	+58.4%

Year	Pop.	±%
1966	10,152	+61.6%
1971	12,274	+20.9%
1976	15,913	+29.6%
1981	17,540	+10.2%
1986	17,958	+2.4%
1991	18,516	+3.1%
1996	19,294	+4.2%

Year	Pop.	±%
2001	19,053	−1.2%
2006	18,927	−0.7%
2011	20,783	+9.8%
2016	22,458	+8.1%
2021	24,104	+7.3%

Mother tongue language (2021)

Language	Population	Pct (%)
French only	22,090	92.6
English only	495	2.1
Both English and French	1,145	4.8
Other languages	795	3.3

== Economy ==
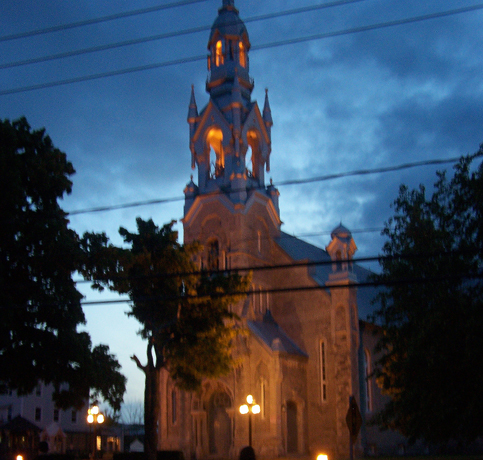
The Saint-Mathieu-de-Belœil church in the old town.

Beloeil, in 2021, had an unemployment rate of 5.0% (the provincial average is 7.6%). The median income in 2020 was $48,800 (the provincial median was $40,800). In 2021, 12 230 inhabitants reported being employed, of whom 5,785 worked outside Beloeil or 71.7%. Beloeil today is primarily a commuter town for people working in Montreal.

The primary industries in terms of employment are the health care and social assistance (13.6%), retail trade (12.8%), manufacturing (9.9%), and construction (9.4%). Other significant fields included professional, scientific and technical services (7.7%) and educational services (7.7%), while public administration (6.3%), finance and insurance (4.8%), accommodation and food services (4.4%) and other services (4.4%) employs much smaller portions of the population.

In February 2005, Beloeil adopted a bylaw limiting the size of commerce on its territory to no more than 40,000 square feet (3,700 m^{2}). This ban was particularly aimed at preventing attempts by Wal-Mart to establish a 110,000-square-foot (10,000 m^{2}) mega-store in the city. The main retail shopping in town is the Montenach Mall, which offers a wide array of shops and services.

== Infrastructure ==
The major road connections to Beloeil are route 116, built in 1940, and autoroute 20, built in 1964. Both of these roads connect Montreal to Quebec by way of Beloeil and Saint-Hyacinthe. The route 116 serves as the primary commercial street of Beloeil.

There is no longer any local train station in Beloeil. Instead, people wishing to take the Montreal commuter train must do so at the McMasterville train station. CIT de la Vallée du Richelieu offers a bus service linking Saint-Hyacinthe to Longueuil by way of Beloeil along route 116. Its Longueuil terminus connects directly to the Yellow Line of the Montreal Metro. An additional, more occasional service links Beloeil to downtown Montreal directly.

However, the vast majority of the population of Beloeil prefer to use the road to commute to work. In 2006, among the local population that worked outside their home, 81% reported driving to work, and 5% reported going in someone else's car, whereas only 7.5% reported using public transit. Among other methods of transportation, 5.9% reported walking or using a bicycle.

== Education ==
In 2021, of the population 15 and older, 64.4% reported having a post-secondary diploma of some form (vocational, CÉGEP or university). 27.6% of the total population reported having a university diploma or degree. Among those who did pursue post-secondary education, 3,310 specialized in business, management and public administration, and 2,515 in architecture, engineering, and related trades.

Locally, Beloeil has five French-language public elementary schools serving around 1200 to 1300 elementary school-age children (6 to 12): Le Petit Bonheur, Le Tournesol, Saint-Mathieu, Jolivent and au Coeur-des-Monts, which belong to the Commission Scolaire des Patriotes, as well as one English-language elementary school, Cedar. Beloeil also has a French-language high school, the École Secondaire Polybel.

The South Shore Protestant Regional School Board previously served the municipality.

== Notable people ==
Several artists, sportsmen and politicians were born, lived, or died in Beloeil:

- Lorne "Gump" Worsley, National Hockey League goaltender for the Montreal Canadiens, New York Rangers and Minnesota North Stars, and member of the Hockey Hall of Fame
- Béatrice La Palme, Early twentieth century opera singer, who performed before king Edward VII
- Louis-Philippe Brodeur, Lawyer, Liberal MP, minister and speaker of the house, Supreme Court justice, and Lieutenant-Governor of Quebec
- Blessed Mother Marie Rose Durocher, founder of the Sisters of the Holy Names of Jesus and Mary
- Philippe-Auguste Choquette, Lawyer, judge, Liberal MP and Senator.
- Chantal Benoit, wheelchair basketball player.
- Allan Leal, Attorney-General of Ontario, member of the Order of Canada.
- Charles Jourdain, Canadian mixed martial arts competing in the Ultimate Fighting Championship.

== See also ==
- List of towns in Quebec
- Jordi-Bonet Bridge
