= Charles Stacey =

Charles Stacey may refer to:

- Charles Perry Stacey (1906–1989), Canadian historian and professor
- Charles Stacey (cricketer) (1878–1950), English cricketer
- Charles Stacey (Medal of Honor) (1842–1924), English-born Ohio volunteer who won the Medal of Honor at Gettysburg

== See also ==
- Charlie Stacey (disambiguation)
