= Stacey (surname) =

Stacey is a surname, and may refer to:

- Alan Stacey (1933–1960), British racing driver
- Alfred E. Stacey (1846–1940), American chair manufacturer and politician
- Anthony Stacey (born 1977), American basketball player and coach
- Bob Stacey (c.1950–2022), American attorney and local politician in Oregon
- Brad Stacey (born 1972), Australian cricketer
- Brian Stacey (1946–1996), Australian conductor
- Brooke Stacey (born 1996) Canadian ice hockey player
- Charles Stacey (cricketer) (1878–1950), English cricketer
- Charles Stacey (Medal of Honor) (1843–1924), United States Army soldier who received a Medal of Honor
- Charles Perry Stacey (1906–1989), Canadian historian
- Chris Stacey (born 1966), Australian rules footballer
- Clark Stacey (born 1980), American video game developer
- Cyril Stacey (1895–1964), English rugby league footballer
- Daniel Stacey (1785–1863), English academic, cleric and cricketer
- David Stacey (born 1965), British swimmer
- Dexter Stacey (born 1992), Canadian stock car racing driver
- Eric G. Stacey (1903–1969), British film director
- Francis Stacey (1830–1885), Welsh-born cricketer and law officer
- Frank Bainard Stacey (1859–1930), Canadian minister, fruit grower and political figure
- Frank D. Stacey (born 1929), Australian geophysicist
- Fred Stacey (1879–1964), Australian politician
- George Stacey (footballer) (1881–1972), English footballer
- George Stacey (abolitionist) (1787–1857), English Quaker abolitionist
- Glenys Stacey (born 1954), British solicitor and civil servant
- Graham Stacey (born 1959), Royal Air Force officer
- Hannah Stacey, British freediver
- Hans Stacey (born 1958), Dutch rally car driver
- Harold Gordon Stacey (1911–1979), Canadian designer and silversmith
- Hugolino Cerasuolo Stacey (1932–2019), Ecuadorian Catholic bishop
- Jack Stacey (born 1996), English footballer
- Jackie Stacey, British feminist film theorist
- Jeremy Stacey (born 1963), British drummer and keyboard player
- Jim Stacey, British guitarist
- Sir John Stacey (1924–1981), Royal Air Force commander
- Joshua Stacey (born 2000), Welsh para table tennis player
- J. Harold Stacey (1898–1963), American businessman and politician from Vermont
- Judith Stacey (born 1943), American sociologist
- Kaye Stacey (born 1948), Australian mathematics educator
- Ken Stacey, American singer, guitarist and songwriter
- Kerry Stacey (born 1977), English actress
- Laura Stacey (born 1994), Canadian ice hockey player
- Louise Stacey (born 1972), Australian tennis player
- Margaret Stacey (1922–2004), British sociologist
- Mark Stacey (born 1964), Welsh antiques expert
- Mary Stacey (born 1961), British judge
- Maurice Stacey (1907–1994), British chemist
- Nadia Stacey, British make-up artist
- Neil Stacey (1934–1987), Australian politician
- Nicholas Stacey (1920–1997), Hungarian-British financial journalist and entrepreneur
- Nicolas Stacey (1927–2017), Church of England priest and social activist
- Paul Stacey (born 1963), British guitarist and producer
- Phil Stacey (born 1978), American singer
- Ralph D. Stacey (1948–2021), British organizational theorist
- Richard Stacey (c.1663–1743), English shipbuilder and designer
- Rick Stacey (born 1966), American politician in Wisconsin
- Robin Stacey, American medievalist and celticist
- Robyn Stacey (born 1952), Australian photographer and artist
- Ruby Stacey (born 2005), British artistic gymnast
- Simone Stacey (born 1977), Australian soul and jazz singer-songwriter
- Sophia Stacey (c. 1791–1874), friend of the poet Percy Shelley
- Steve Stacey (born 1958), Australian rugby league footballer
- Steve Stacey (footballer) (born 1944), English football player
- Susannah Stacey, mystery novel pseudonym of Jill Staynes and Margaret Storey
- Terry Stacey (born 1962), British cinematographer
- Terry Stacey (footballer) (born 1936), English footballer
- Tom Stacey (1930–2022), British novelist, journalist and penologist
- Valerie Stacey, Lady Stacey (born 1954), Scottish lawyer
- Vanessa Stacey (born 1978), New Zealand film, television and stage actress
- Victor Stacey (1944–2020), Church of Ireland priest
- Vivienne Stacey (1928–2010), English Christian missionary
- Warren Stacey (born c. 1979), British R&B singer-songwriter
- Warwick Stacey (born 1952), Australian army officer and politician
- Wesley Stacey (1941–2023), Australian photographer and photojournalist

== See also ==
- Stacy (surname)
