= Steacy =

Steacy may refer to:

- Ashley Steacy (born 1987), Canadian rugby union player
- Brendan Steacy, Canadian cinematographer
- Harold Robert Steacy (1923–2012), Canadian mineralogist
- Heather Steacy (born 1988), Canadian hammer thrower
- James Steacy (born 1984), Canadian hammer thrower
- Ken Steacy (born 1955), Canadian comic artist
- Newton Phillips Steacy (1896–1969), Canadian politician
- Will Steacy (born 1980), American writer and photographer

== See also ==
- Stacy (disambiguation)
- Steacyite
