= Stacy =

Stacy or Stacey may refer to:

== Places ==
In the United States:

- Stacy, California, an unincorporated community
- Stacy, Kentucky
- Stacy, Minnesota, a city
- Stacy, Virginia, a village

== People ==
- Stacy (given name)
- Stacy (Malaysian singer) (born 1990), Malaysian singer, winner of the sixth season of Akademi Fantasia
- Stacy (zouk singer), singer from Martinique and Guyana
- Stacey (singer) (born 2003), Filipino singer, member of the girl group Bini

=== Surname ===
- Stacy (surname)
- Stacey (surname)

== Other uses ==
- Atari Stacy, a computer in the Atari ST family
- Stacy (film), a 2001 Japanese zombie horror film
- Stacey (film), a 1973 exploitation film directed by Andy Sidaris
- "Stacy", a 2010 song by Iyaz from Replay
- Stacy (slang), in slang usage, a female counterpart of the male Chad, or a sexually attractive woman
- "Stacey (Take You Higher)", a 2026 song by XO

== See also ==
- StayC (disambiguation)
- Steacy, a surname
