= Jordi-Bonet Bridge =

Bridge on Richelieu River, Quebec, Canada

Jordi-Bonet Bridge Pont Jordi-Bonet
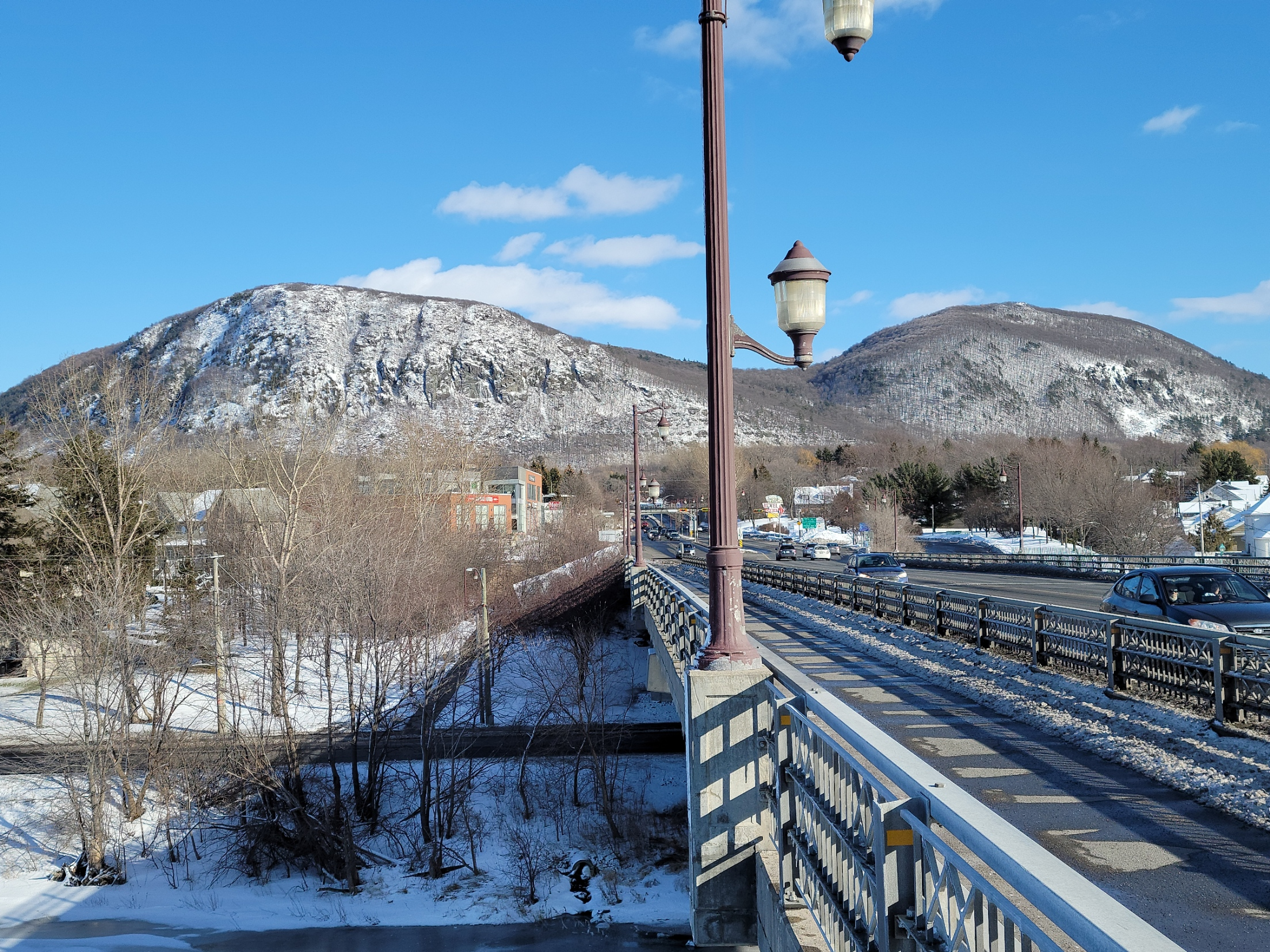
- View of Saint-Hilaire Mountain from the middle of Jordi-Bonet Bridge
- Coordinates: 45°33′50″N 73°12′02″W
- Carries: 4 lanes of Route 116 and Route 229
- Crosses: Richelieu River
- Locale: Beloeil and Mont-Saint-Hilaire, Quebec, Canada

Characteristics
- Material: Steel and ciment
- Total length: 388.6 m (1,275 ft)
- Width: 21.7 m (71 ft)
- No. of lanes: 4

History
- Construction end: 2000
- Opened: 2000
- Inaugurated: 2000

Statistics
- Daily traffic: 44,000

Location
- Interactive map of Jordi-Bonet Bridge

The Jordi-Bonet Bridge (French: pont Jordi-Bonet) is a road bridge linking Beloeil and Mont-Saint-Hilaire and spanning the Richelieu River, in La Vallée-du-Richelieu Regional County Municipality, in Montérégie, Québec, Canada.

This bridge mainly serves residents of the Beloeil-Mont-Saint-Hilaire region, as well as traffic connecting Saint-Bruno to Saint-Hyacinthe, along Sir-Wilfrid-Laurier Boulevard.

The bridge serves as a crossing for Quebec Route 116 and 229. It has four traffic lanes, two in each direction, which are separated by a double central line. A bicycle path and sidewalk are also provided on the north side of the bridge.

In addition to the river, the bridge spans Route 223 (rue Richelieu) on the left bank and Route 133 (chemin des Patriotes) on the right bank of the Richelieu River. Access roads connect these two roads to the bridge.

Daily traffic on this bridge is estimated at 44,000 vehicles, for an annual average of 16 million vehicles.

== History ==
Even though the current version of the bridge was built in 2000, there has been a bridge there since 1941.

The bridge is named in honor of Jordi Bonet (Barcelone, Espagne, 1932-Mont-Saint-Hilaire, 1979), a Quebec painter, ceramist, muralist and sculptor of Catalan Spanish origin who lived in Mont-Saint-Hilaire for the last ten years of his life.

In 1969, Jordi Bonet produced a superb mural of more than 1,000 m^{2} (11,000 sq ft), in concrete, in the triptych of the Grand Théâtre de Québec; this work is one of his great achievements in North America. Bonet settled in 1960 at the Rouville-Campbell manor, located along the east bank of the Richelieu River, in Mont-Saint-Hilaire. This mansion is designed in the Tudor style. He resides there until his death. The entrance to the Rouville-Campbell manor is located 0.5 km (0.31 mi) from the Jordi-Bonet bridge, by Chemin des Patriotes (route 133).

=== Construction ===
The Jordi-Bonet bridge was built in the year 2000.

== Gallery ==
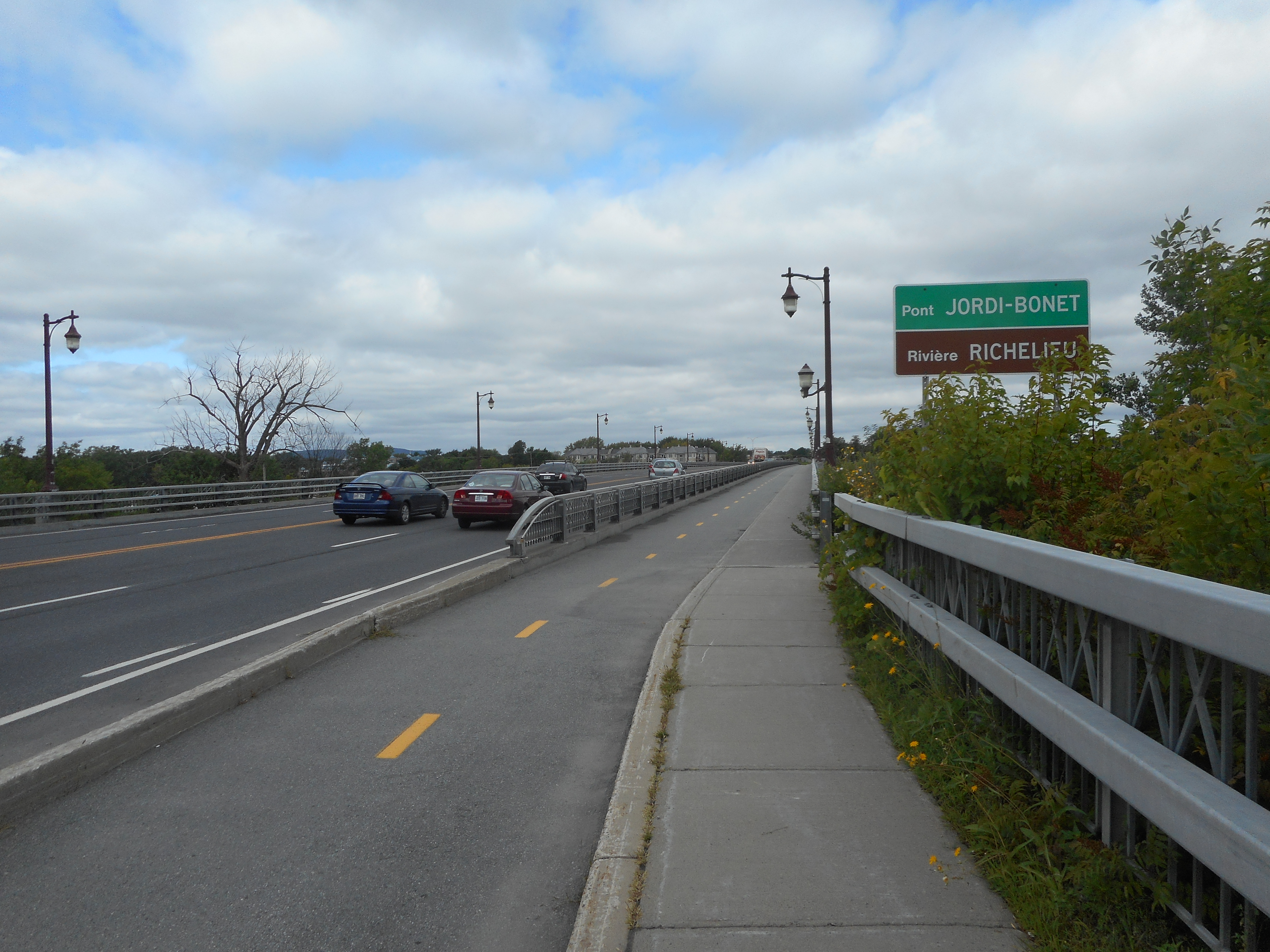

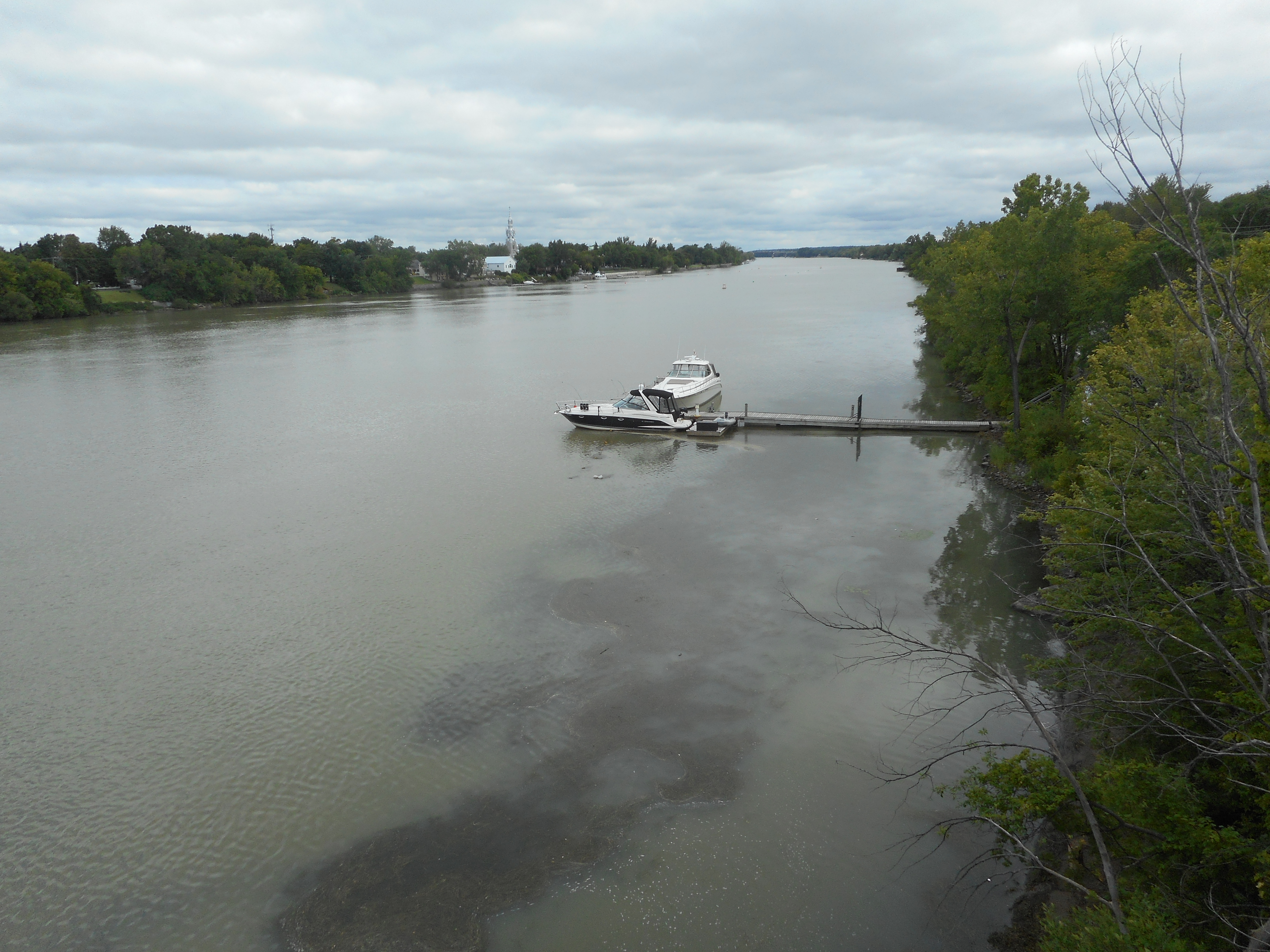

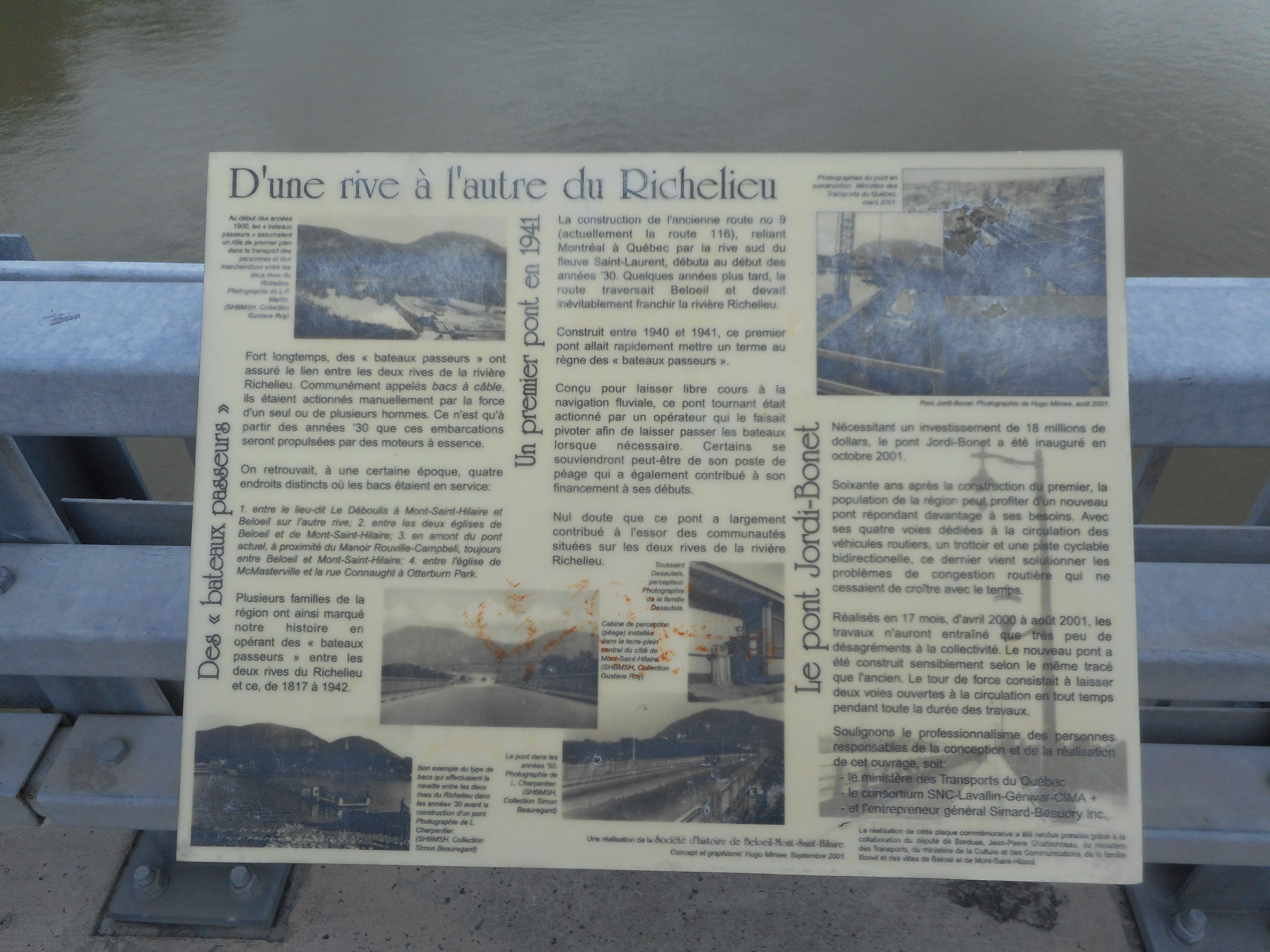

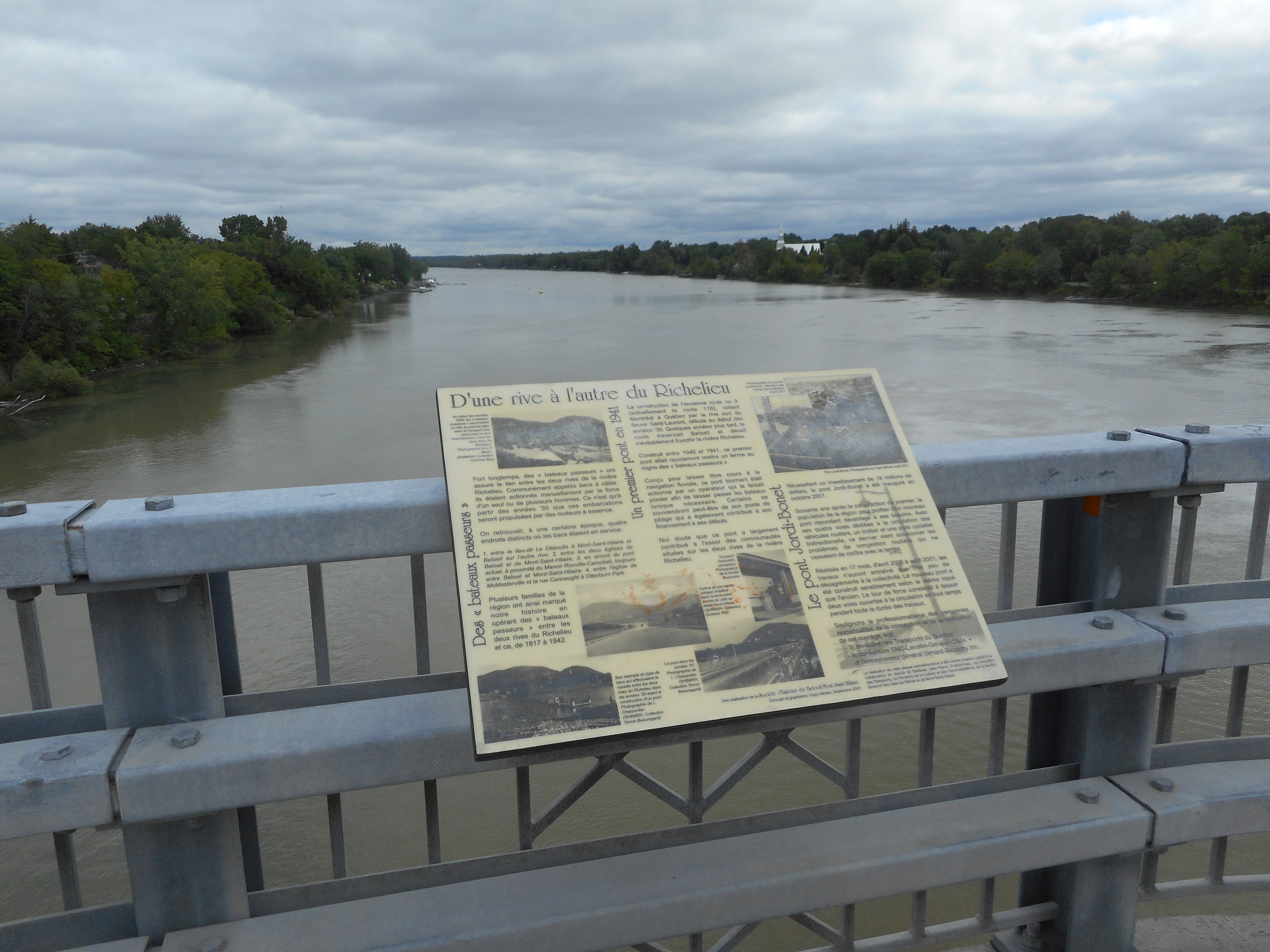

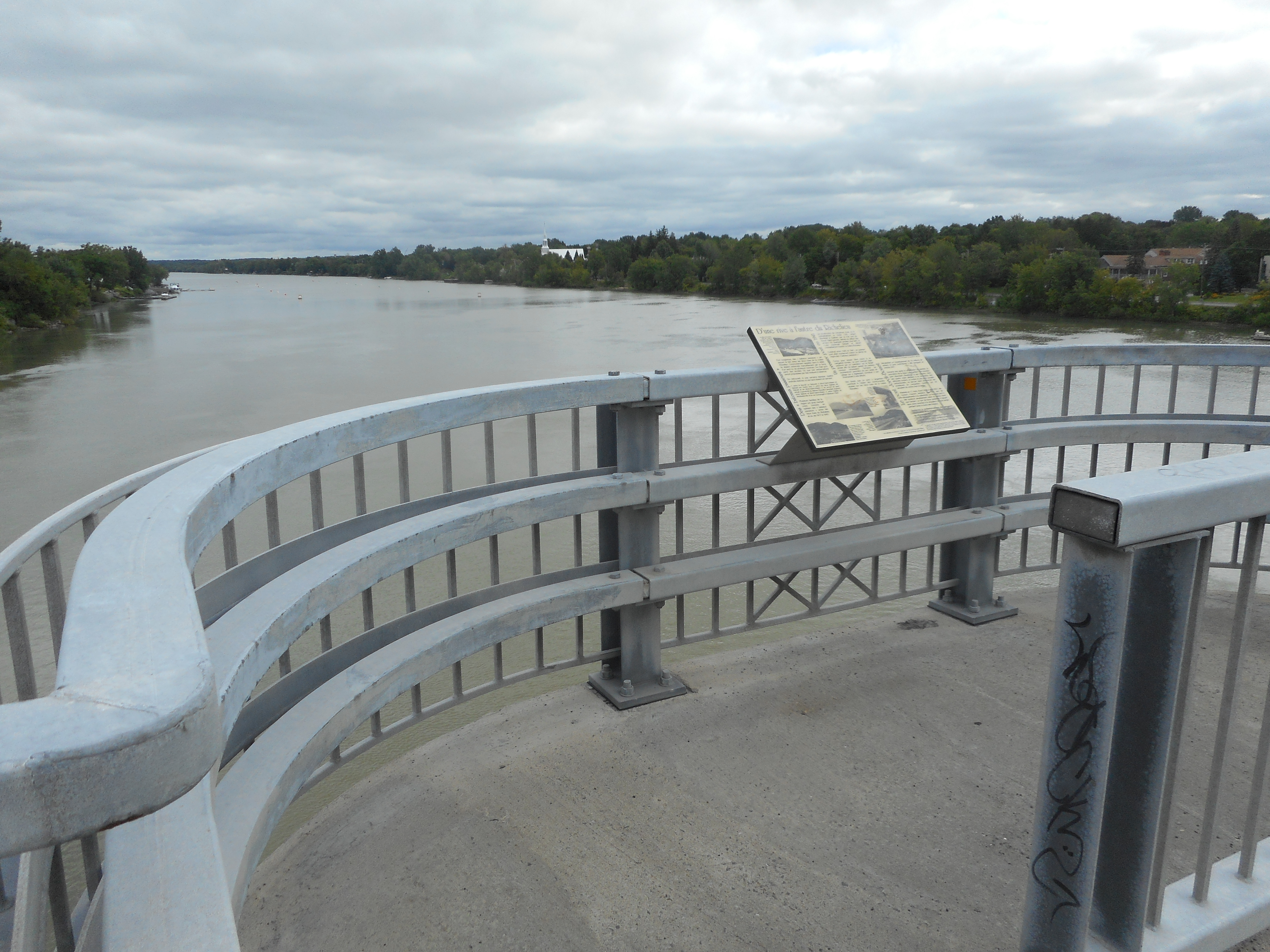

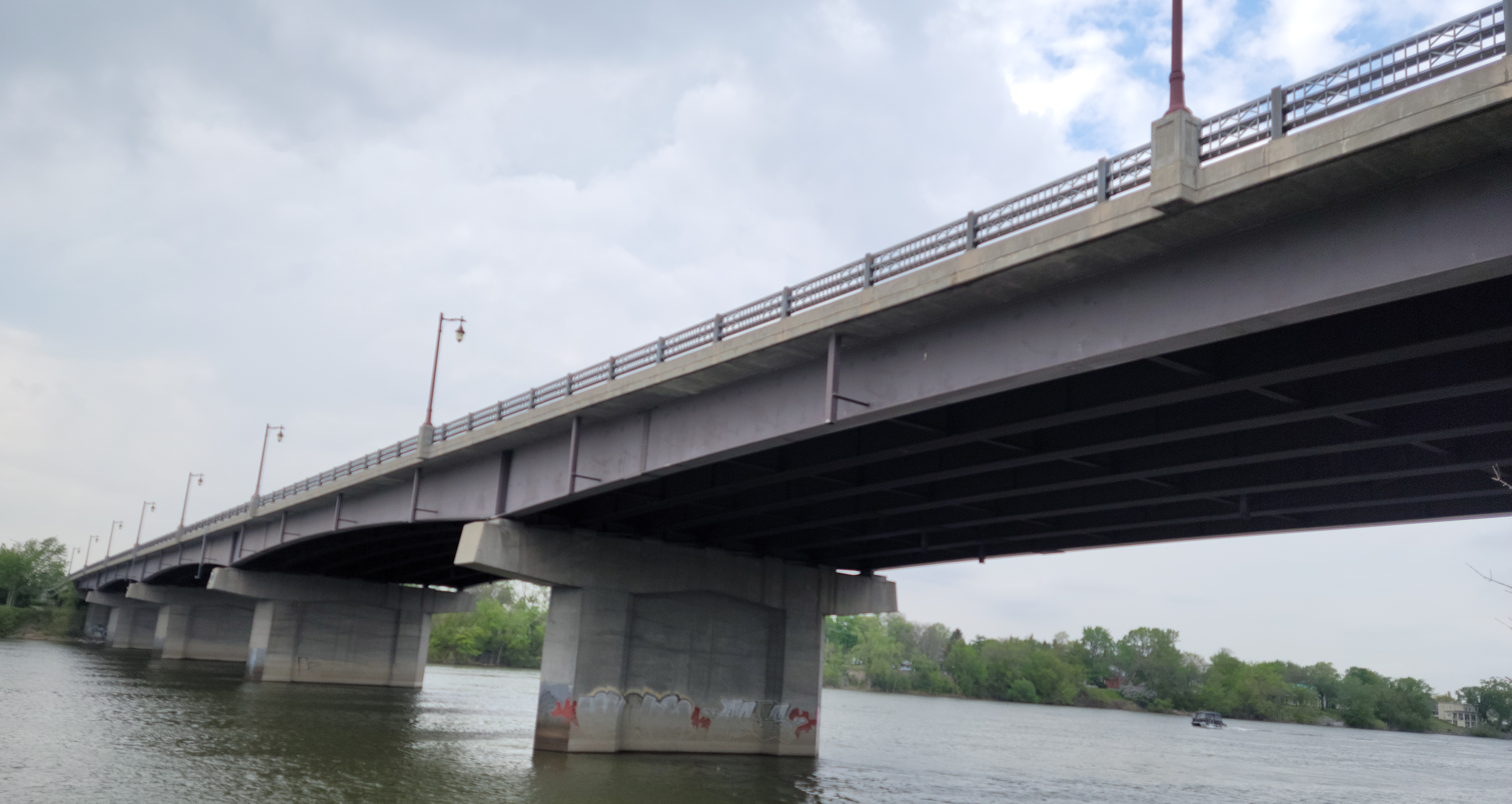

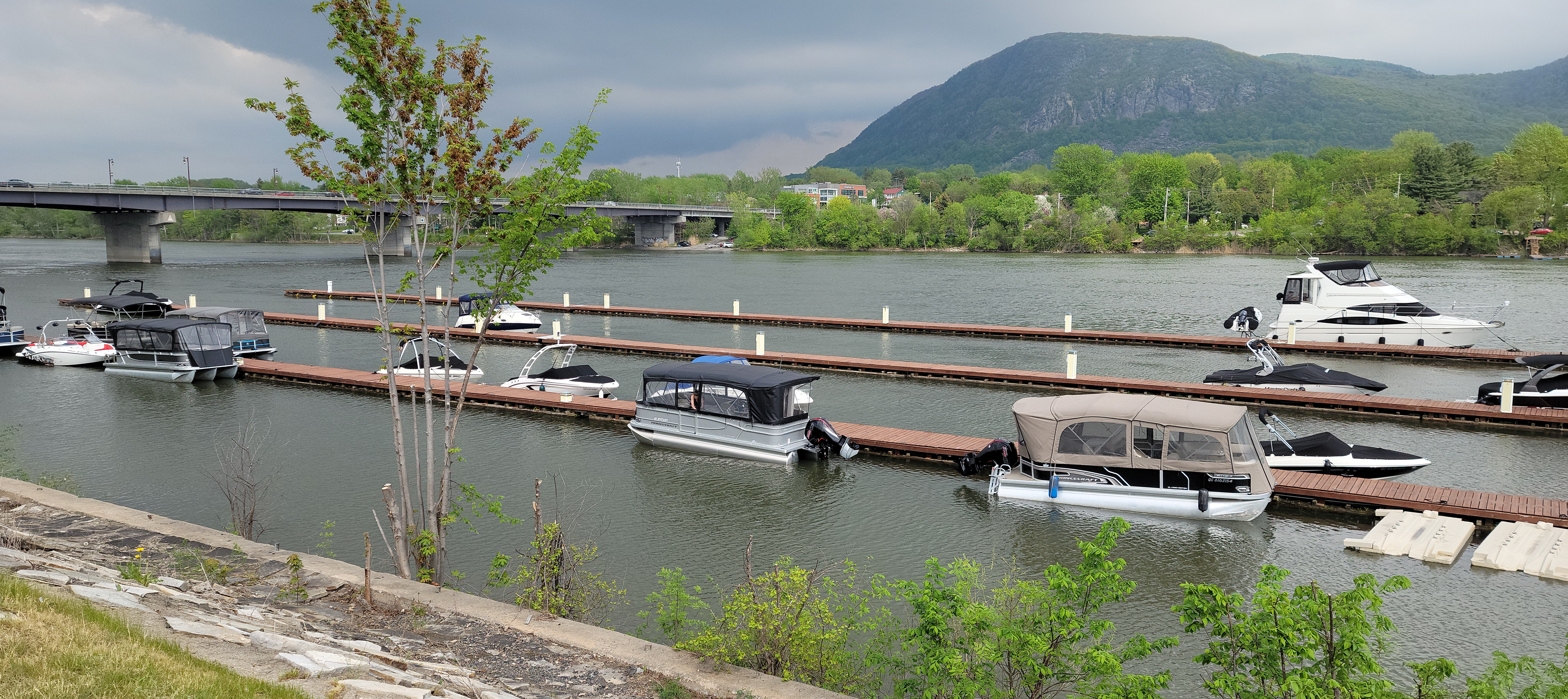

== See also ==
- List of bridges in Canada
- Jordi Bonet
- Richelieu River
- Mont-Saint-Hilaire
- Beloeil
