= StayC (disambiguation) =

STAYC is a South Korean girl group formed in 2020.

StayC or STAYC may also refer to:

- Star to a Young Culture, the debut single album by STAYC
- Stay-C, a 2011 studio album by Malaysian singer Stacy

== See also ==
- Stay (disambiguation)
- Stay Cool
- Stay Close
- Stacy (disambiguation)
- STAC (disambiguation)
