= Neil Shields =

Sir Neil Stanley Shields OBE MC (7 September 1919 – 12 September 2002) was a British politician and businessman.

Shields was born in London and served as a major in the Royal Artillery in World War II, during which time he was awarded the Military Cross. In 1949 he unsuccessfully stood as the Conservative Party parliamentary candidate for St Pancras North. Shields served on Hampstead Borough Council between 1947 and 1965, serving as deputy leader, and as chairman of the finance and works committees.

Shields later became an adviser in merger broking, especially in the role of director of Chesham Amalgamations and Investments (1964–1984). He was Chairman of the London area of the National Union of Conservative and Unionist Associations (1961–1963), and was thrice a member of the Conservative Party National Executive.

He was knighted in 1964 for political and public services in London and Hampstead.

During his time as the chairman of the Commission for New Towns (1982–1995) Shields oversaw the doubling of the number of new towns under the commission's control, as all the independent New Town Development Corporations were wound up by 1992, as part of the Conservative Government's proposals under Margaret Thatcher to reduce the number of Quangos. The commission, under his chairmanship, was converted from a holding body to a disposal agency, selling off billions of pounds of assets. At the same time Shields also served on the board of London Transport (1986–1993), serving six months as interim Chairman (1988–89) after the Fennell report into the King's Cross fire, and afterwards as deputy chairman.
