= Otterburn Park =

- City
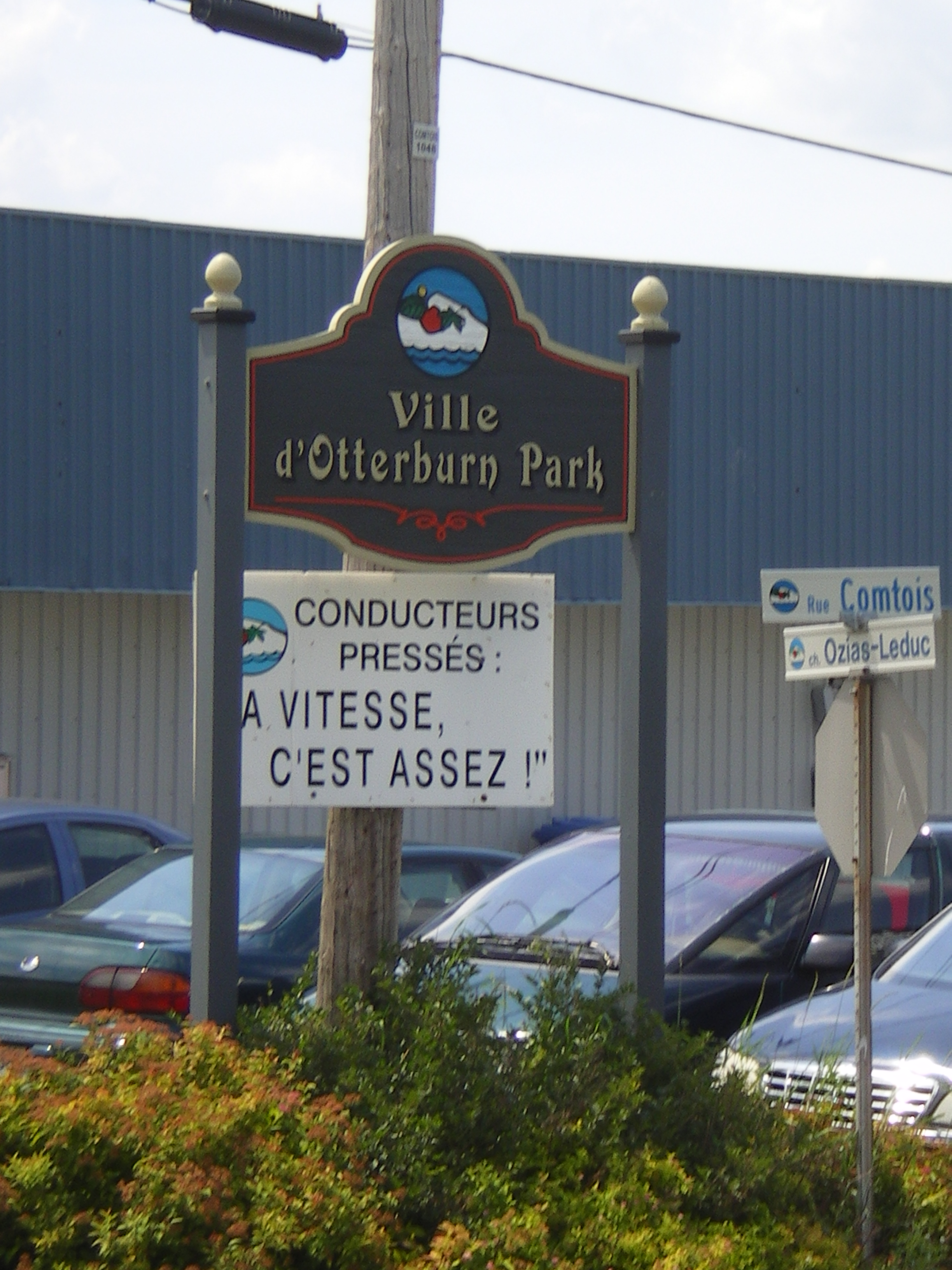
- Entrance sign for the city of Otterburn Park

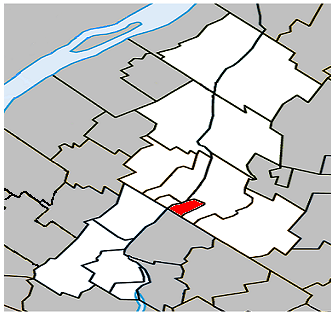
- Location within La Vallée-du-Richelieu RCM.

- Location in southern Quebec.
- Coordinates: 45°32′N 73°13′W
- Country: Canada
- Province: Quebec
- Region: Montérégie
- RCM: La Vallée-du-Richelieu
- Constituted: July 1, 1855

Government
  - Mayor: Mélanie Villeneuve
  - Federal riding: Beloeil—Chambly
  - Prov. riding: Borduas

Area
  - Total: 5.70 km^{2} (2.20 sq mi)
  - Land: 5.37 km^{2} (2.07 sq mi)

Population (2021)
  - Total: 8,479
  - Density: 1,578.2/km^{2} (4,088/sq mi)
  - Pop 2016-2021: ▲0.7%
  - Dwellings: 3,381
- Time zone: UTC−5 (EST)
  - Summer (DST): UTC−4 (EDT)
- Postal code(s): J3H 2M6
- Area codes: 450 and 579
- Highways: R-133
- Website: www.ville. otterburnpark.qc.ca

Otterburn Park is a Quebec town that lies south of Mont-Saint-Hilaire on the Richelieu River and is located 40 kilometres (25 mi) east of Montreal. The population as of the Canada 2021 Census was 8,479.

== History ==
Originally a rural agricultural area, Otterburn Park's transformation began in the late 1800s, when it became a favourite weekend destination for employees of the Grand Trunk Railway, which, starting in 1885, ran a weekend train from Bonaventure Station to Mont-Saint-Hilaire. Occasional recreational visitors, including railroad employees, bought or built summer cottages, spurring development and, eventually, permanent settlement.

Until 1949, the Otterburn park was a neighbourhood within Mont-Saint-Hilaire parish. It took its present name, Otterburn Park, by vote in 1953.

Otterburn Park was the scene of the St-Hilaire train disaster in 1864, in which nearly 100 people were killed when an immigrant train failed to stop at an open swing bridge and fell into the Richelieu. The disaster remains the worst railroad accident in Canadian history, and the bridge is known to this day as the Pont Noir, or black bridge.

== Demographics ==
According to the Office québécois de la langue française, Otterburn Park has been officially recognized as a bilingual municipality since 1978-04-22.

In the 2021 Census of Population conducted by Statistics Canada, Otterburn Park had a population of 8,479 living in 3,335 of its 3,381 total private dwellings, a change of 0.7% from its 2016 population of 8,421. With a land area of 5.37 km^{2} (2.07 sq mi), it had a population density of 1,579.0/km^{2} (4,089.5/sq mi) in 2021.

Population trend:

Census	Population	Change (%)
2021	8,479	▲0.7%
2016	8,421	▼0.3%
2011	8,450	▼0.2%
2006	8,464	▲7.6%
2001	7,866	▲7.5%
1996	7,320	▲21.1%
1991	6,046	▲32.3%
1986	4,571	▲6.6%
1981	4,268	▲2.6%
1976	4,159	▲18.4%
1971	3,512	▲14.6%
1966	3,065	▲16.7%
1961	2,627	▲70.1%
1956	1,544	▲42.3%
1951	1,085	▼24.3%
1941	1,433	▲64.1%
1931	873	▲8.9%
1921	802	▼38.7%
1911	1,309	▲2.7%
1901	1,275	▲1.9%
1891	1,251	▼9.5%
1881	1,383	▲14.5%
1871	1,208	▼23.6%
1861	1,581	N/A

Mother tongue language (2021)

Language	Population	Pct (%)
French only	7,615	89.9%
English only	455	5.4%
Both English and French	155	1.8%
Other languages	225	2.7%

== Education ==
The South Shore Protestant Regional School Board previously served the municipality.

== See also ==
- List of cities in Quebec
