= 55th Ohio Infantry Regiment =

- Active: September 1861 to July 11, 1865
- Country: United States
- Allegiance: Union
- Branch: Union Army
- Type: Infantry
- Engagements: Battle of McDowell; Battle of Cross Keys; Battle of Cedar Mountain; Second Battle of Bull Run; Battle of Chancellorsville; Gettysburg campaign; Battle of Gettysburg; Battle of Wauhatchie; Chattanooga campaign; Battle of Missionary Ridge; Atlanta campaign; Battle of Resaca; Battle of Dallas; Battle of New Hope Church; Battle of Allatoona; Battle of Kennesaw Mountain; Battle of Peachtree Creek; Siege of Atlanta; Sherman's March to the Sea; Carolinas campaign; Battle of Bentonville

The 55th Ohio Infantry Regiment was an infantry regiment in the Union Army during the American Civil War.

== Service ==
The 55th Ohio Infantry Regiment was organized at Camp McClellan in Norwalk, Ohio September through December 1861 and mustered in for three years service on January 25, 1862, under the command of Colonel John C. Lee.

The regiment was attached to Schenck's Brigade, Railroad District, West Virginia, to March 1862. Railroad District, Department of the Mountains, to April 1862. Schenck's Brigade, Department of the Mountains, to June 1862. 2nd Brigade, 1st Division, I Corps, Pope's Army of Virginia, to September 1862. 2nd Brigade, 1st Division, XI Corps, Army of the Potomac, to May 1863. 2nd Brigade, 2nd Division, XI Corps, Army of the Potomac, to October 1863, and Army of the Cumberland, to April 1864. 3rd Brigade, 3rd Division, XX Corps, Army of the Cumberland and Army of Georgia, to July 1865.

The 55th Ohio Infantry mustered out of service at Louisville, Kentucky, on July 11, 1865.

== Detailed service ==
Ordered to Grafton, Va., January 25. Moved from Grafton to New Creek, Va., February 3, 1862. Expedition to Romney February 6. Expedition to Moorefield February 12–16. Action at Moorefield February 12. Moved to Grafton February 19, and duty there until March 31. Moved to Green Spring River March 31, then to Romney April 10. Ordered to Join Milroy at Monterey. Battle of McDowell May 8. March to the Shenandoah Valley May 26–29. Near Franklin May 26. Harrisonburg June 6. Battle of Cross Keys June 8. At Middletown until July 7, and at Sperryville until August 8. Reconnaissance to Madison Court House July 16–19. Battle of Cedar Mountain August 9 (in reserve). Slaughter Mountain August 10. Pope's Campaign in northern Virginia August 16-September 2. Catlett's Station August 22. Battles of Bull Run August 28–30. Duty in the defenses of Washington, D.C., until December. Reconnaissance to Bristoe Station and Warrenton Junction September 25–28. Moved to Fredericksburg December 12–16. "Mud March" January 20–24, 1863. At Falmouth until April. Chancellorsville Campaign April 27 – May 6. Battle of Chancellorsville May 1–5. Gettysburg Campaign June 11 – July 24. Battle of Gettysburg July 1–3. Pursuit of Lee July 5–24. At Catlett's Station, Va., July 25 to September 24. Movement to Bridgeport, Ala., September 24 – October 3. Reopening Tennessee River October 26–29. Battle of Wauhatchie, Tenn., October 28–29. Chattanooga-Ringgold Campaign November 23–27. Orchard Knob November 23. Tunnel Hill November 24–25. Missionary Ridge November 25. March to relief of Knoxville, Tenn., November 28 – December 17. Duty in Lookout Valley until May 1864. Atlanta Campaign May 1 to September 8. Demonstrations on Rocky Faced Ridge May 8–11. Buzzard's Roost Gap May 8–9. Battle of Resaca May 14–15. Cassville May 19. Advance on Dallas May 22–25. Action at New Hope Church May 25. Operations on line of Pumpkin Vine Creek and battles about Dallas, New Hope Church, and Allatoona Hills May 26 – June 5. Operations about Marietta and against Kennesaw Mountain June 10 – July 2. Pine Hill June 11–14. Lost Mountain June 15–17. Gilgal or Golgotha Church June 15. Muddy Creek June 17. Noyes Creek June 19. Cassville June 20. Kolb's Farm June 22. Assault on Kennesaw June 27. Ruffs Station July 4. Chattahoochie River July 5–17. Peachtree Creek July 19–20. Siege of Atlanta July 22 – August 25. Operations at Chattahoochie River Bridge August 26 – September 2. Farmer's Ferry August 27. Occupation of Atlanta September 2 to November 15. March to the sea November 15 – December 10. Siege of Savannah December 10–21. Campaign of the Carolinas January to April, 1865. Lawtonville, S.C., February 2. North Edisto River February 12–13. Reconnaissance on Goldsboro Road, near Fayetteville, N.C., March 14. Taylor's Hole Creek, Aversyboro, March 16. Battle of Bentonville March 19–21. Occupation of Goldsboro March 24. Advance on Raleigh April 10–14. Occupation of Raleigh April 14. Bennett's House April 26. Surrender of Johnston and his army. March to Washington, D.C., via Richmond, Va., April 29 – May 19. Grand Review of the Armies May 24. Moved to Louisville, Ky., June 10, and duty there until July.

== Casualties ==
The regiment lost a total of 262 men during service; 7 officers and 136 enlisted men killed or mortally wounded, 119 enlisted men died of disease.

== Commanders ==
- Colonel John C. Lee – resigned May 8, 1863, following the Battle of Chancellorsville
- Colonel Charles B. Gambee – killed in action at the Battle of Resaca
- Colonel Edwin H. Powers – commander until the final muster

== Notable members ==
- Private Charles Stacey (Medal of Honor), Company D – Medal of Honor recipient for action at the battle of Gettysburg, July 2, 1863

== See also ==
- List of Ohio Civil War units
- Ohio in the Civil War
- Gettysburg campaign
- Chattanooga campaign
- Siege of Atlanta
- Sherman's March to the Sea
- Carolinas campaign
