= Quebec Route 229 =

Highway in Quebec, Canada

Route 229

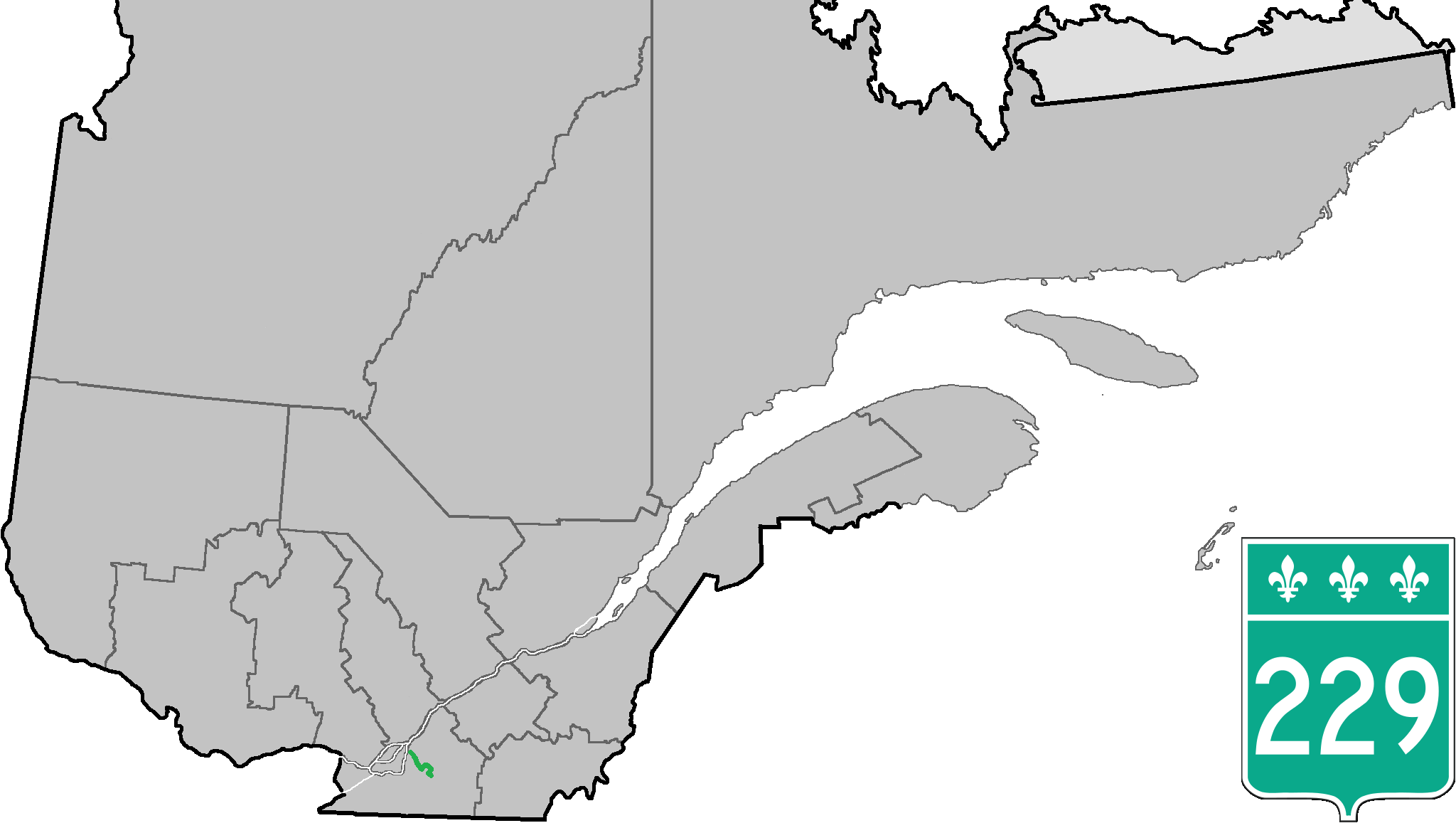

Route information
- Maintained by Transports Québec
- Length: 53.6 km (33.3 mi)

Major junctions
- South end: R-112 in Rougemont
- A-20 (TCH) / A-30 in Sainte-Julie
- North end: R-132 in Varennes

Location
- Country: Canada
- Province: Quebec
- Major cities: Varennes

Highway system
- Quebec provincial highways; Autoroutes; List; Former
| ← R-228 | → R-230 |

Route 229 is a Quebec provincial highway located in the Montérégie region. It runs from the junction of Route 112 in Rougement and ends at the junction of Route 132 in Varennes. It overlaps Route 227 in Saint-Jean-Baptiste and Route 116 in Beloeil and Mont-Saint-Hilaire.

== Municipalities along Route 229 ==
- Rougemont
- Saint-Jean-Baptiste
- Mont-Saint-Hilaire
- Beloeil
- Saint-Mathieu-de-Beloeil
- Sainte-Julie
- Varennes
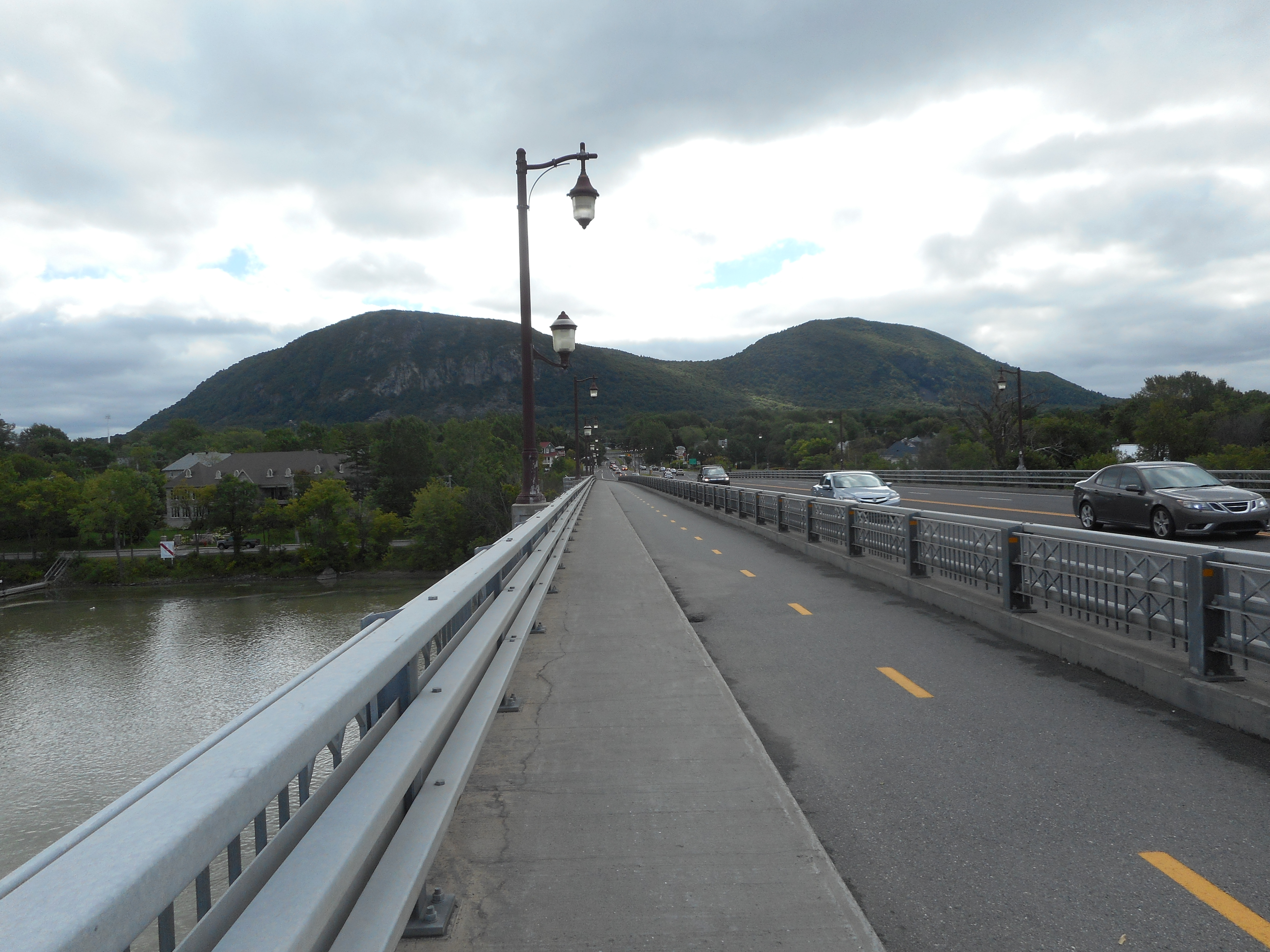
Route 229 shares Jordi-Bonet bridge with Route 116 between Belœil and Mont-Saint-Hilaire.

== See also ==
- List of Quebec provincial highways
