= Steacyite =

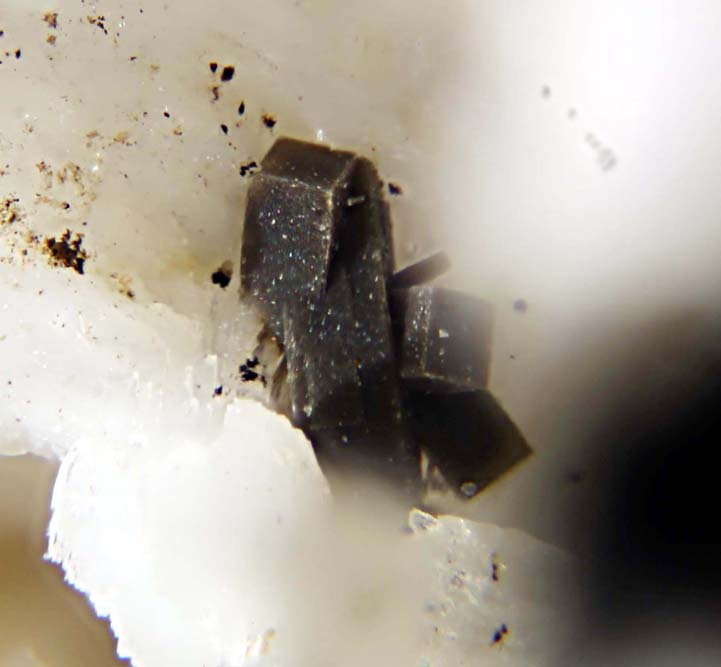
- Steacyite crystals from the type locality of Mont-Saint-Hilaire, Quebec

General
- Category: Cyclosilicate
- Formula: K_{variable}(Ca,Na)_{2}(Th,U)Si_{8}O_{20}
- IMA symbol: Scy
- Strunz classification: 9.CH.10
- Crystal system: Tetragonal
- Crystal class: Ditetragonal dipyramidal (4/mmm); H-M symbol: (4/m 2/m 2/m)
- Space group: P4/mcc

Identification
- Color: Gray, dark brown, green, beige
- Mohs scale hardness: 5
- Luster: Vitreous, greasy, dull
- Diaphaneity: Translucent, opaque
- Other characteristics: Radioactive

Steacyite is a complex silicate mineral containing thorium and uranium; formula K_{variable}(Ca,Na)_{2}(Th,U)Si_{8}O_{20}. It forms small brown or yellow green crystals, often cruciform twinned crystals. It is radioactive. It was discovered at Mont-Saint-Hilaire, Quebec in 1982 and is named after Harold Robert Steacy (1923–2012), mineralogist.

== See also ==
- List of minerals
- List of minerals named after people
