= Chesham Amalgamations =

UK mergers and acquisitions broking company

Chesham Amalgamations & Investments
- Type: Private
- Industry: Merger Broking
- Founded: London, 1962
- Founder: Francis Singer; Nicholas Stacey
- Headquarters: London
- Key people: Philip Craig; Jonathan Reddaway
- Website: cheshamamalgamations.com

Chesham Amalgamations is the trading name of Chesham Amalgamations & Investments Limited, a pioneering mergers and acquisitions broking company based in the UK. It was formed in 1962 by Francis Singer and Nicholas Stacey, both Austro-Hungarian, at 36 Chesham Place, Belgravia, with the intention of assisting

in "peaceful" mergers and, in this respect, played a small but significant role in the reorganization of UK industry during the Sixties and Seventies. The company was unusual in dealing only with uncontested mergers, and so avoided the protracted battles that were often harmful to the companies involved.

— John Warner, Obituary: Nicholas Stacey, The Independent (London), 5 February 1997

Stacey introduced Sir Miles Thomas, later Lord Thomas of Remenham, who had previously been Chairman of the British Overseas Airways Corporation, now British Airways, and President and Chairman of the National Savings Committee. Thomas later became Chairman of Chesham.

The company benefitted from the formation of the Industrial Reorganisation Corporation by the 1966 British Labour government, which had the intention of promoting and helping finance regroupings in industry, and which thus encouraged a trend toward bigger business. In 1966–1967 it successfully concluded US$50 million worth of corporate mergers.

By 1969, the company had recruited Sir Neil Shields as its third director.
