= Beloeil train disaster =

1864 train crash in Quebec, Canada

Coordinates: 45°32′53″N 73°12′36″W

Belœil train disaster
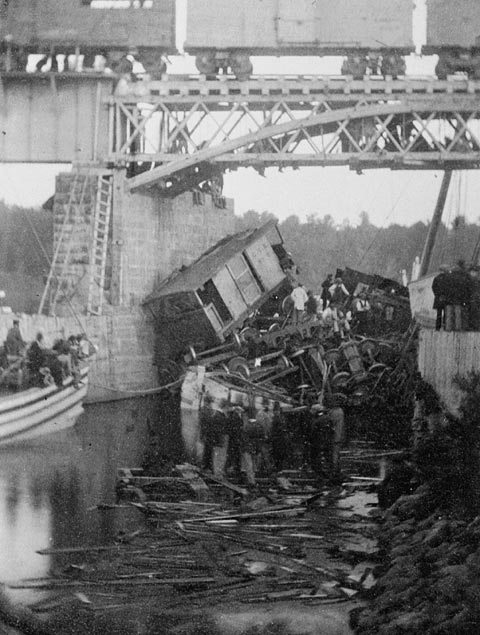
- Photograph of the disaster by A. Bazinet & Co Montreal

Details
- Date: June 29, 1864; 162 years ago 1:20 a.m.
- Location: Belœil, Quebec
- Country: Province of Canada
- Line: Grand Trunk Railway
- Incident type: Swing bridge open
- Cause: Signal passed at danger

Statistics
- Passengers: 354–475
- Deaths: 99
- Injured: 100

The Belœil train disaster occurred on June 29, 1864, at the present-day town of Belœil, Quebec. A passenger train fell through an open swing bridge into the Richelieu River after the crew failed to obey a stop signal. The widely accepted death toll is 99 people. The disaster remains the worst railway accident in Canadian history.

== Background ==
During the 19th century, the Richelieu River served as an important waterway for trade between New York City and Montreal. Tourism also greatly developed in the area due to the steamboats that travelled up and down the river. The Belœil Bridge was built as a swing bridge so that the railway would not interrupt the shipping lanes. The bridge connects the present-day municipalities of Otterburn Park, on the river's east bank, with Belœil, on its west bank. Other nearby municipalities are Mont-Saint-Hilaire, on the east bank, and McMasterville, on the west bank.

The British-owned Grand Trunk Railway company was founded in 1852 to carry passengers and freight in what is now Ontario and Quebec. By the early 1860s, the high cost of building the railway system and the failure to achieve expected levels of usage had put the company deeply in debt. Immigrant traffic from ships arriving at Quebec City and Lévis bound for Upper Canada and the U.S. midwest was an important source of revenue for the Grand Trunk.

== Disaster ==
On June 29, 1864, a Grand Trunk train carrying between 354 and 475 passengers, many of them German and Polish immigrants, was travelling from Quebec City to Montreal. According to his own testimony the engineer in charge of the train, William Burnie, had been born in Glasgow in 1838, immigrated to Montreal at the age of 8, was employed by the Grand Trunk from 1858 onward, and had been promoted to the rank of locomotive engineer on 18 June 1864.

The passengers had arrived at Lévis in the sailing ship Neckar from Hamburg the previous day. Specialized immigration cars, colonist cars, had not yet been developed for North American immigration, so the passengers were crammed into nine crudely converted boxcars and one old passenger car.

At around 1:20 a.m. local time the train was approaching the Belœil Bridge. The sky was clear that night. The swing bridge had been opened to allow the passage of five barges and a steamer ship. A red light 1.6 km (1 mi) ahead of the bridge signalled to the train that the crossing was open and it needed to slow. However, the light was not acknowledged by the conductor, Thomas Finn, or the engineer, William Burnie, and the train continued towards the bridge from the east. Burnie's decision not to stop before the bridge was a violation of the safety laws in Canada East (modern-day Quebec).

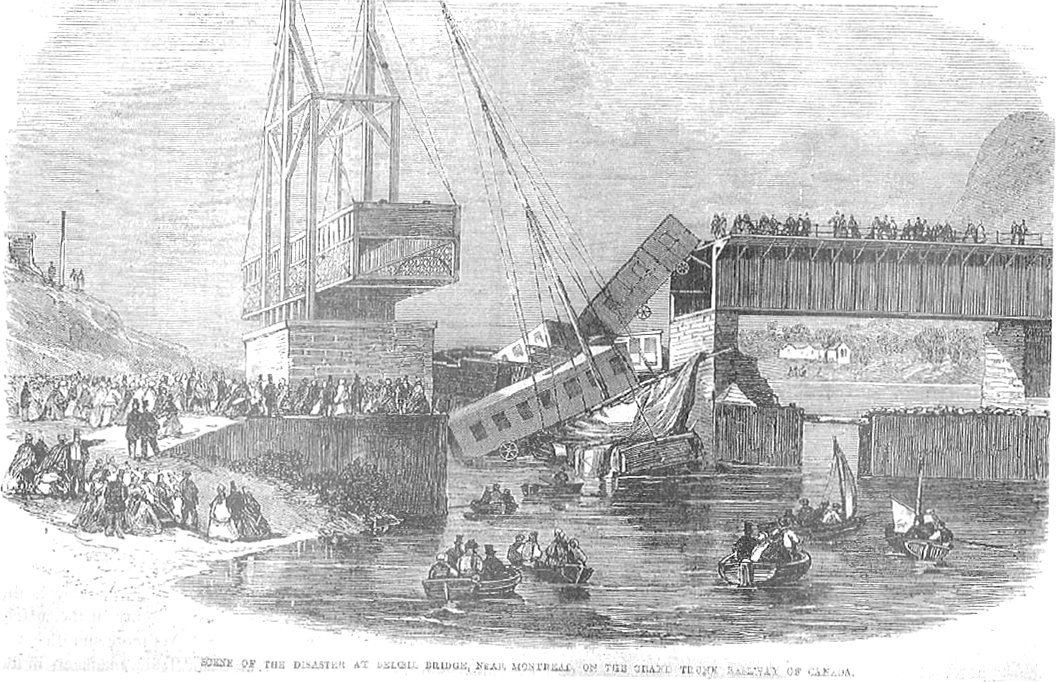
Contemporary drawing of the recovery effort, published in The Illustrated London News.

At 1:20 a.m. the train came onto the bridge and fell through the open gap. The engine and eleven coaches fell one after another on top of each other, crushing a barge underneath. The train and barge sank into an area of the river with a depth of 3 metres (10 ft).

The crash killed 99 people aboard and approximately 100 more were injured. Among the dead were Finn and the engine fireman. Burnie was able to escape the wreck with slight injuries. The numismatist Alfred Sandham, then resident in Montreal, described the scene: "The cars were literally broken to pieces, and between the piers of the bridge lay the sunken vessels covered with the wreckage of the cars, amongst which were entangled the bruised and mangled bodies of the unfortune victims". One witness described the scene: "It seemed as if they had been placed under a press of enormous power and crushed into an unrecognizable mass of splinters and iron, mixed here and there with car wheels in every position, shreds of clothing, loaves of bread, bundles, and human bodies bruised, battered and covered with blood." A journalist from The Montreal Gazette newspaper reported the scene: "A shapeless blue mass of heads and hands and feet protruded among the splinters and framework and gradually resolved itself into a closely packed mass of human beings, all ragged and bloody and dented and dinged from crown to foot with blue bruises."

=== Response ===
Survivors were rescued by the crews of the steamer and barges, who in some cases had to chop open the sides of the sinking boxcars. The Grand Trunk Railway sent large numbers of men to assist the recovery and relief efforts the following day. The rescue effort was supported by members of the German Society of Montreal, the St. George's Society of Montreal, the St. Patrick's Society of Montreal and the Irish Protestant Benevolent Society of Montreal. The habitants helped to pull the wounded out of the wreckage and makeshift hospitals were set up in buildings near the incident. Roger Cloutier of the Belœil–Mont-Saint-Hilaire Historical Society stated In 2013: "Several residents of Belœil and surrounding towns came to lend a hand to rescue as many survivors as possible". The financially struggling Grand Trunk Railroad company, which feared a blot on its reputation, made a great point of assisting the victims.

The hospitals and other institutions in nearby Montreal were used for the injured passengers. Most of the injured were treated at the Protestant hospital and Catholic hospital, namely Montreal General and Hotel Dieu. Some of the most badly injured had to be treated at the railroad shed as they arrived in Montreal. The dead were also brought to Montreal and buried in the Mount Royal and Roman Catholic cemeteries. Thomas Roddick, a young doctor from the British colony of Newfoundland who was visiting Montreal, was asked by George Fenwick, a surgeon at Montreal General, to assist with treating the injured. Roddick, who had been planning to go to Edinburgh for more medical studies, ended up staying in Montreal as a result of his experiences with treating the injured as Fenwick was impressed with his skills. Roddick became a prominent doctor in Montreal and was knighted by King George V in 1914 for his medical work.

=== Aftermath ===
The Grand Trunk Railway tried to blame the disaster on the conductor and engineer for failing to obey the standing order to stop before crossing the bridge. The engineer, who had only recently been hired, claimed that he was not familiar with the route and that he did not see the signal. He also claimed that the signal was not clear enough for him to see. Burnie was convicted of negligence on July 16, 1864, and sentenced to 10 years in prison. Burnie's admission that he knew he had to stop his train before crossing the bridge was considered to be strong evidence against him.

On October 5, 1864, a grand jury placed full responsibility for the disaster on the Grand Trunk Railway for negligence in failing to ensure all trains stopped before crossing the bridge as required by statute: "... the Grand Jury consider it their duty to reiterate their solemn conviction that the Grand Trunk Railway Company of Canada are mainly responsible for the melancholy catastrophe of the 29th of June last, and the great destruction of life caused thereat, and that they trust the said Company will be found amenable to tribunal for their shameful treatment of their numerous passengers on that occasion." However, the company was only given a reprimand for "inadequate supervision".

== See also ==
- List of rail accidents in Canada
- List of Canadian disasters by death toll
- List of rail accidents (before 1880)

== Books ==
- Brice Frost, Stanley (1980). McGill University for the Advancement of Learning: 1895–1971. Montreal: McGill-Queen's University Press. ISBN 0773503536.
- Sandham, Alfred (1870). Ville-Marie Or, Sketches of Montreal, Past and Present. Montreal: Bishop.
