= Charlie Stacey =

Charlie Stacey may refer to:

- Charlie Stacey, keyboardist with Yussef Dayes
- Charlie Stacey, fictional character in Into the Night (1985 film)

== See also ==
- Charles Stacey (disambiguation)
