= STAC =

STAC may refer to:

== Computers and electronics ==
- stac (Set AC Flag) instruction on x86 CPUs, part of Supervisor Mode Access Prevention
- Stac Electronics, a former American technology company
  - Lempel–Ziv–Stac, a data compression algorithm developed by Stac Electronics
- SigmaTel Audio Codec
- an extended version of the Graphic Adventure Creator software
- SpatioTemporal Asset Catalog, an open specification to describe geospatial information.

== Education ==
- Southern Theatre Arts Centre, a training venue in Durrington by Sea, Worthing, West Sussex, England
- St. Thomas Aquinas College, Sparkill, New York
- Saint Thomas Aquinas College (Sogod), Southern Leyte, Philippines
- St Andrew's College, Christchurch, New Zealand

== Transportation ==
- Service des transports de l'agglomération chambérienne (Stac), a transport service in Chambéry, France; part of Compagnie générale française des transports et entreprises
- Service de transport adapté de la Capitale, a transport service in Quebec, Canada
- Special Transit Advisory Commission, a commission that founded the Triangle Transit transport service in North Carolina, United States
- STAC Swiss Government Flights, see List of airline codes (S)
- Supersonic Transport Aircraft Committee

== Other uses ==
- STAC (protein), a protein containing a C1 domain
- Sepak Takraw Association of Canada, a sport association
- Sirtuin-activating compound, a class of biochemical compounds
- Spatial and Temporal Analysis of Crime, see Crime hotspots
- Stac, the Gaelic word for a sea stack, commonly used in Scotland

== See also ==
- STACS
