= Harold Robert Steacy =

Canadian mineralogist

- Born: June 7, 1923; Ottawa, Ontario
- Died: April 7, 2012 (aged 88); Ottawa, Ontario
- Relatives: Digby Denham, grandfather

Harold "Hal" Robert Steacy (June 7, 1923 – April 7, 2012) was a Canadian mineralogist who was the curator of the Canadian National Mineral Collection at the Geological Survey of Canada in Ottawa. The mineral steacyite is named for him.

== Literature cited ==
- Dunn, P.J., Fleischer, M., Burns, R.G. and Pabst, A. 1983. New mineral names. American Mineralogist 68:471–475.
