= Saint-Mathieu-de-Beloeil =

Municipality in Quebec, Canada

- Municipality
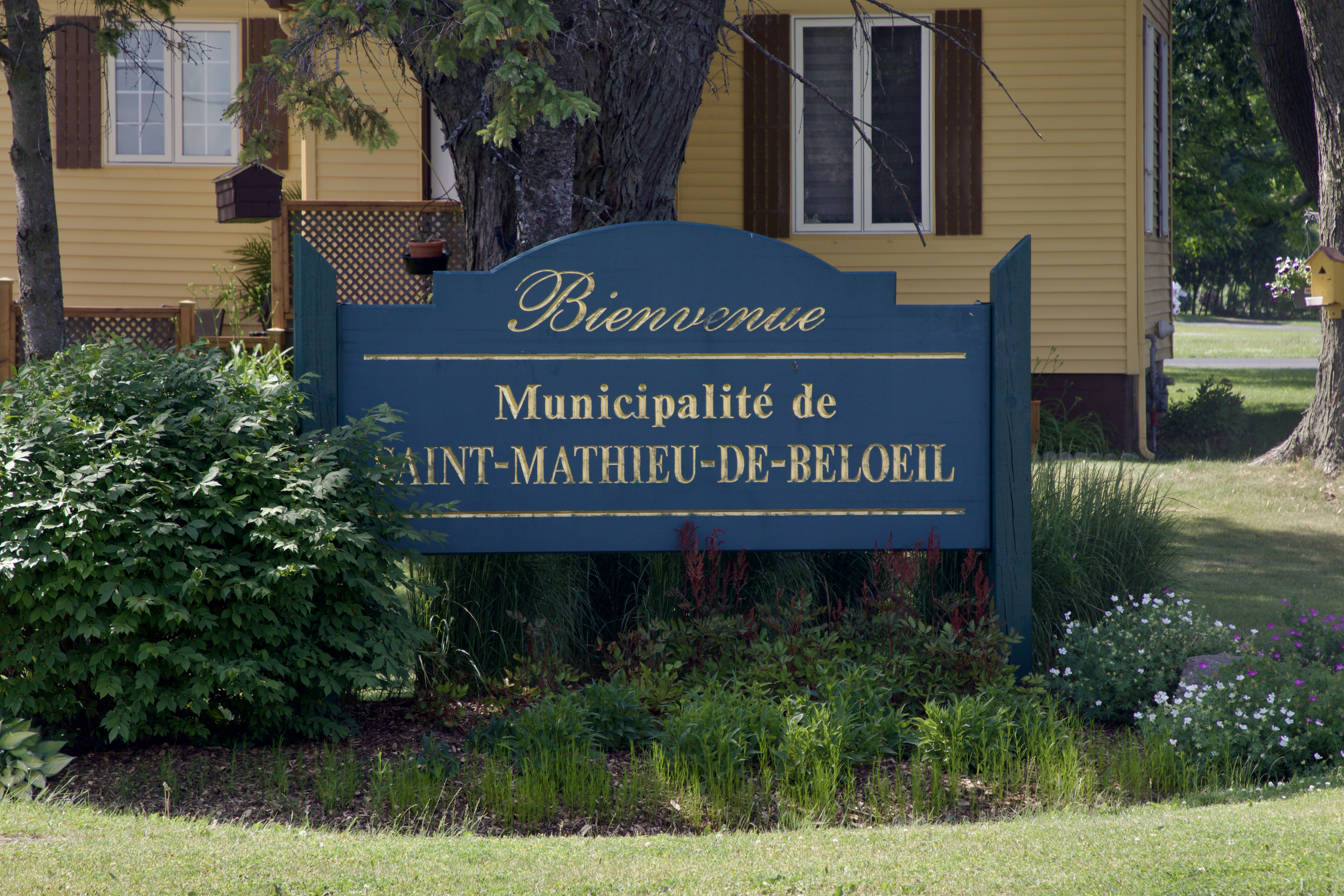
- Entrance of Saint-Mathieu-de-Beloeil

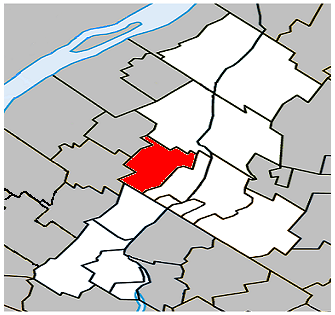
- Location within La Vallée-du-Richelieu RCM.

- Location in southern Quebec.
- Coordinates: 45°34′N 73°12′W
- Country: Canada
- Province: Quebec
- Region: Montérégie
- RCM: La Vallée-du-Richelieu
- Constituted: July 1, 1855
- Named for: Matthew the Apostle and the Seignory of Beloeil

Government
  - Mayor: Normand Teasdale
  - Federal riding: Pierre-Boucher—Les Patriotes—Verchères
  - Prov. riding: Borduas

Area
  - Total: 39.40 km^{2} (15.21 sq mi)
  - Land: 39.39 km^{2} (15.21 sq mi)

Population (2021)
  - Total: 2,952
  - Density: 74.9/km^{2} (194/sq mi)
  - Pop 2016-2021: ▲12.7%
  - Dwellings: 1,197
- Time zone: UTC−05:00 (EST)
  - Summer (DST): UTC−04:00 (EDT)
- Postal code(s): J3G 2C9
- Area codes: 450 and 579
- Highways A-20 (TCH): R-229
- Website: www.saint-mathieu- de-beloeil.com

Saint-Mathieu-de-Beloeil (French pronunciation: [sɛ̃ matjø də bɛlœj]) is a municipality in southwestern Quebec, Canada, east of Montreal in the Regional County Municipality of La Vallée-du-Richelieu. The population as of the 2021 Canadian Census was 2,952.

== Demographics ==
=== Population ===
Population trend:

Census	Population	Change (%)
2021	2,952	▲12.7%
2016	2,619	▼0.2%
2011	2,624	▲14.7%
2006	2,288	▲2.3%
2001	2,236	▲4.3%
1996	2,143	▲10.1%
1991	1,947	▲9.2%
1986	1,783	▲16.2%
1981	1,535	▲93.8%
1976	792	▲40.7%
1971	563	▲3.7%
1966	543	▼58.1%
1961	1,296	▲10.8%
1956	1,170	▲17.1%
1951	999	▲25.8%
1941	794	▼4.1%
1931	828	▼5.9%
1921	880	▲33.3%
1911	660	▼60.3%
1901	1,661	▼8.0%
1891	1,805	▲4.2%
1881	1,732	▲0.8%
1871	1,719	▼12.3%
1861	1,960	N/A

=== Language ===
Mother tongue language (2021)

Language	Population	Pct (%)
French only	2,795	94.7%
English only	60	2.0%
Both English and French	30	1.0%
Other languages	50	1.7%

== Education ==
The South Shore Protestant Regional School Board previously served the municipality.

== See also ==
- List of municipalities in Quebec
