= Stacy (surname) =

Stacy is a surname and may refer to:

- Angelica Stacy, professor of chemistry at the University of California
- Bill W. Stacy (1938–2024), American educator and university administrator
- Billy Stacy (1936–2019), American football player and politician
- Clyde Stacy (1936–2013), American singer
- Dan Stacy, Missouri politician
- Enid Stacy (1868–1903), British activist
- Gaylon Stacy (1934–2011), American politician
- Henry Stacy Marks (1829–1898), British artist
- Herbert Edward Stacy Abbott (1814–1883), officer in the armies of the East India Company and British Crown in India
- Hollis Stacy (born 1954), American professional golfer
- Ima Winchell Stacy (1867–1923), American educator
- James William Stacy, better known as Red Stacy (1912–1998), American football player
- James Stacy, stage name of Maurice William Elias (1936–2016), American film and television actor
- Jay Stacy (born 1968), Australian former field hockey midfielder
- Jess Stacy (1904–1995), American jazz pianist
- Jim Stacy (1930–2016), American entrepreneur
- John Stacy (born 1953), American politician
- Mahlon Stacy (1638–1704), English settler to New Jersey.
- Neil Stacy (born 1941), British actor and Historian
- Nelson Stacy (1921–1986), American race car driver
- Percival Stacy Waddy (1875–1937), Australian schoolmaster, clergyman, and cricketer
- Robert Stacy McCain (born 1959), American conservative journalist, writer, and blogger
- Siran Stacy (born 1968), American former professional football player
- Spider Stacy (born 1958), English singer-songwriter-musician
- Stephanie F. Stacy (born 1962), American lawyer
- Walter P. Stacy (1884–1951), chief justice of the North Carolina Supreme Court
- William B. Stacy (1838–1921), United States Navy sailor
- William Stacy (1734–1802), American Revolutionary War officer and pioneer to the Ohio Country
- Zac Stacy (born 1991), American football player

== Fictional characters ==
- George Stacy, fictional character appearing in American comic books published by Marvel Comics
- Gwen Stacy, fictional character appearing in American comic books published by Marvel Comics

== See also ==
- Stacey (surname)
