= Nicholas Stacey =

Nicholas Anthony Howard Szecsi (Stacey), known as Nicholas Stacey, (5 December 1920 – 19 January 1997) was a financial journalist, writer, entrepreneur and patron of the arts.

== Career and history ==
Stacey was born in Debrecen, Hungary but in 1939, came to England to study in the Faculty of Commerce at Birmingham University. In 1945 Stacey joined the editorial staff of the London Financial Times. In 1946, he became a member of the post-war reconstruction committee, working with Nicholas Kaldor, Leonard Woolf and Christopher Mayhew. In 1951 Stacey won a Fulbright Scholarship to the Graduate Business School of Columbia University, where he lectured on economic history. In 1962 Stacey was a co-founding Chairman of Chesham Amalgamations in London, an innovative mergers and acquisitions company, which played a role in the reorganization of British industry in the Sixties and Seventies. After selling Chesham Amalgamations in 1984, Stacey became Chairman of Cel-Sci Corporation, Virginia, a US company engaged in cancer and AIDS research. He was also a financier at this time of research programmes at the Chelsea and Westminster Hospital, London. In 1969 Stacey became Chairman of Trustees of the Society for the Promotion of New Music at which he reconstructed the trust and successfully reorganized its financial structure. He also chaired the Appeals Committee of the Byam Shaw School of Art, London, and was a founding trustee of the Bankside Gallery and Chairman of the Council of the Divertimenti Orchestra.
