= Charles Stacey (cricketer) =

English cricketer

Charles Frederick Stacey (27 April 1878 – 1950) was an English first-class cricketer active 1901 who played for Surrey. He was born in Chalfont St Giles; died in Scotland.

Married Annie Ives in 1905, Chalfont St Giles. By 1901 he was a professional cricketer. Son of James Stacey and Mary Annie (née.Bolton). 3 children
