= Charles Stacey (Medal of Honor) =

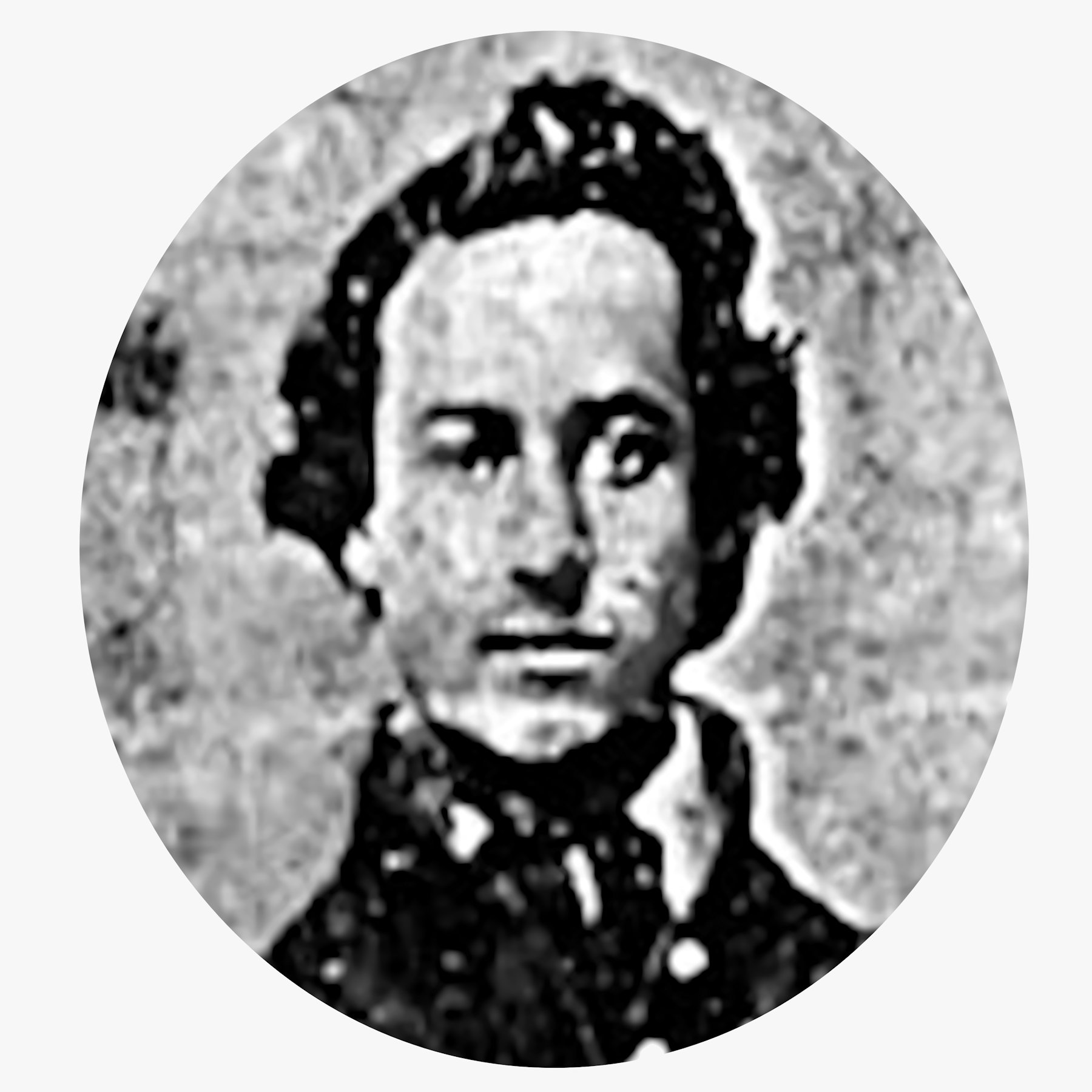
- Born: January 22, 1843; Earith, Cambridgeshire, England
- Died: October 17, 1924 (aged 81); Norwalk, Ohio
- Burial place: Woodlawn Cemetery, Norwalk, Ohio
- Military career
- Allegiance: United States
- Branch: United States Army
- Service years: 1861–1864
- Rank: Private
- Units: Company D, 55th Ohio Volunteer Infantry Regiment
- Conflicts: American Civil War; *Battle of Gettysburg
- Awards: Medal of Honor

Charles Stacey (January 22, 1843 – October 17, 1924) was a United States Army soldier who received a Medal of Honor for the heroism he displayed when fighting in the Battle of Gettysburg in 1863. he died in Ohio in 1924

== Gettysburg ==
Stacey was born in Cambridgeshire, England. He enlisted in the Army on 13 September 1861 in the Union Army in Company D, 55th Ohio Infantry. At Gettysburg, the main body of the 55th was kept in reserve, but its skirmishers were sent out in front of Cemetery Hill. On July 2, during combat, Stacey voluntarily took a position on the skirmish line further toward the Confederates to help find snipers that were attacking the artillery on Cemetery Hill. He remained out front even after the skirmishers were called back in. He was taken prisoner and remained a POW until 19 May 1864. On October 19, 1864, he mustered out at the end of his enlistment and returned to Ohio.

Stacey is buried at Woodlawn Cemetery, Norwalk, Ohio.

== Medal of Honor citation ==
Rank and organization: Private, Company D, 55th Ohio Infantry. Place and date: At Gettysburg, Pa., 2-July 3, 1863. Entered service at: Norwalk, Ohio. Birth: England. Date of issue: September 11, 1897.

Citation:

Voluntarily took an advanced position on the skirmish line for the purpose of ascertaining the location of Confederate sharpshooters, and under heavy fire held the position thus taken until the company of which he was a member went back to the main line.

== See also ==
- Battle of McDowell
- Battle of Cross Keys
- Battle of Cedar Mountain
- Second Battle of Bull Run
- Battle of Chancellorsville
- Gettysburg Campaign
- Battle of Gettysburg
