= Mont-Saint-Hilaire =

City in Quebec, Canada

- City
- Mont-Saint-Hilaire
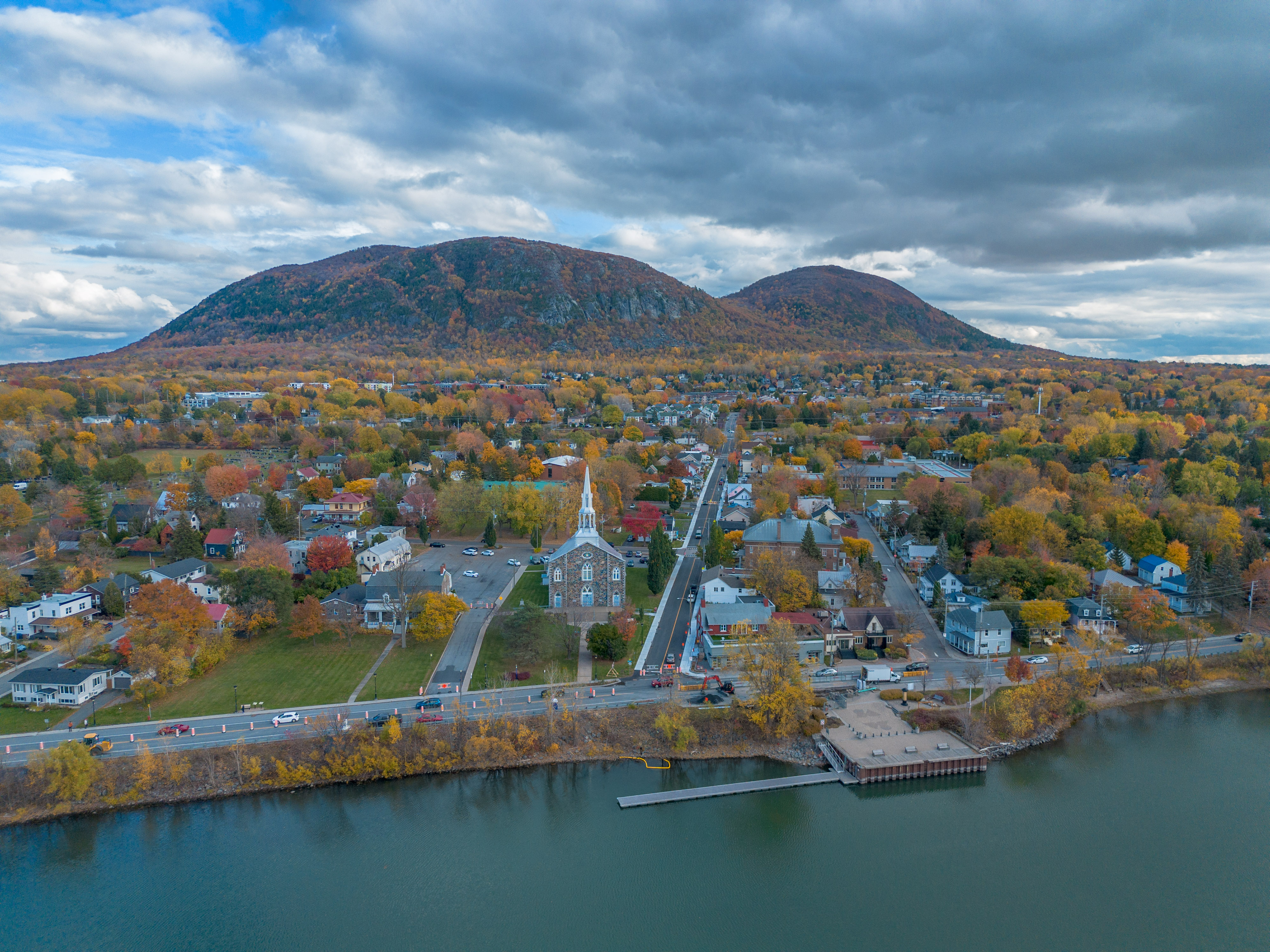
- Mont-Saint-Hilaire in 2025

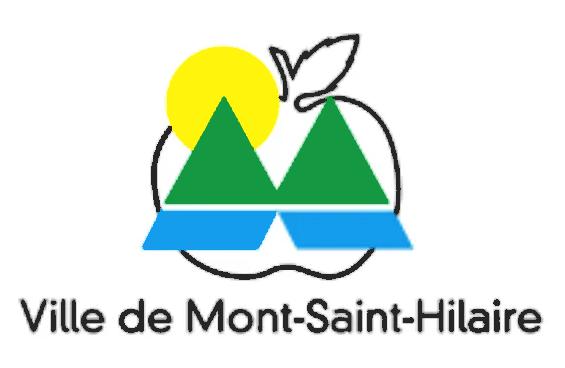
- Logo

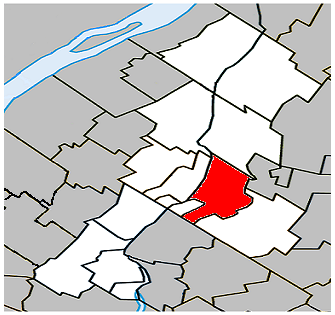
- Location within La Vallée-du-Richelieu RCM.

- Location in southern Quebec.
- Coordinates: 45°33′44″N 73°11′30″W
- Country: Canada
- Province: Quebec
- Region: Montérégie
- RCM: La Vallée-du-Richelieu
- Constituted: 12 March 1966

Government
  - Mayor: Marc-André Guertin
  - Federal riding: Beloeil—Chambly
  - Prov. riding: Borduas

Area
  - Total: 45.50 km^{2} (17.57 sq mi)
  - Land: 44.08 km^{2} (17.02 sq mi)

Population (2021)
  - Total: 18,859
  - Density: 427.8/km^{2} (1,108/sq mi)
  - Pop 2016–2021: ▲1.5%
  - Dwellings: 7,917
- Time zone: UTC−5 (EST)
  - Summer (DST): UTC−4 (EDT)
- Postal code(s): J3H
- Area codes: 450 and 579
- Highways A-20 (TCH): R-116; R-133
- Website: www.villemsh.ca

Mont-Saint-Hilaire (French pronunciation: [mɔ̃ sɛ̃t‿ilɛʁ]) is a suburb of Montreal on the South Shore of southeastern Quebec, Canada, on the Richelieu River in the Regional County Municipality of La Vallée-du-Richelieu. The population as of the Canada 2021 Census was 18,859. The city is named after the Mont Saint-Hilaire.

A significant deposit of the semi-precious mineral sodalite is located near Mont-Saint-Hilaire.

== History ==
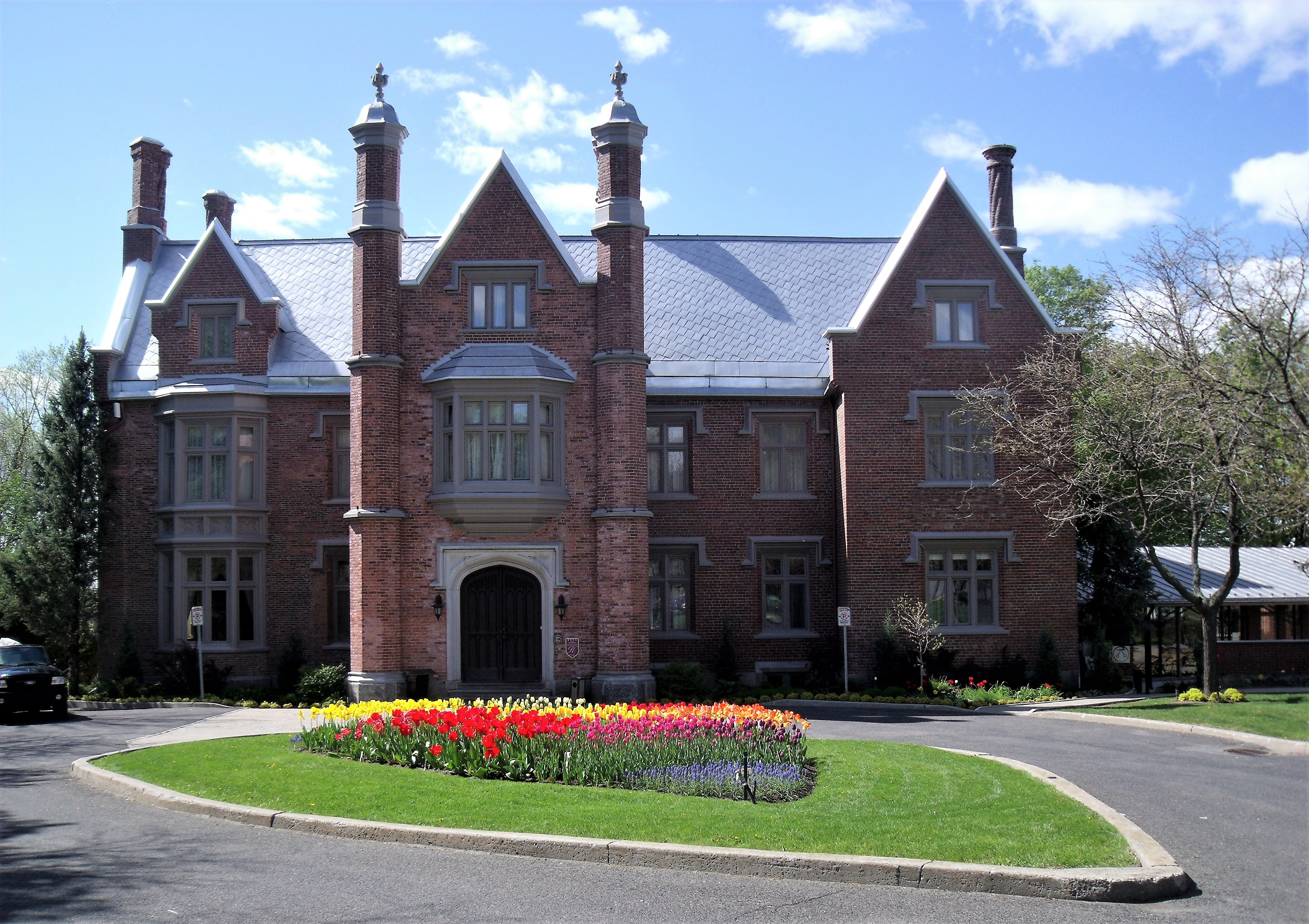
Manoir Rouville-Campbell, built by Major Thomas Edmund Campbell

Jean-Baptiste Hertel de Rouville was granted the seignory of the region in 1694. By 1745 a mountain village had been formed with the first chapel being built in 1798 near the Richelieu River. Nearly twenty years later, in 1822, a ferry operating between Beloeil and Mont-Saint-Hilaire came into service. A bridge, enabling Beloeil and St. Hilaire to be connected by rail, was built in 1848 by the St. Lawrence and Atlantic Railway.

The Campbell family, which owned the mountain after the Rouvilles, sold the mountain to an English officer, Brigadier-General Andrew Gault, who owned it for 45 years. Gault then bequeathed the mountain to McGill University before his death in 1958.

== Demographics ==
In the 2021 Census of Population conducted by Statistics Canada, Mont-Saint-Hilaire had a population of 18,859 living in 7,766 of its 7,917 total private dwellings, a change of 1.5% from its 2016 population of 18,585. With a land area of 44.08 km^{2} (17.02 sq mi), it had a population density of 427.8/km^{2} (1,108.1/sq mi) in 2021.

Population trend:

Census	Population	Change (%)
2021	18,859	▲1.5%
2016	18,585	▲2.1%
2011	18,200	▲15.8%
2006	15,720	▲10.2%
2001	14,270	▲9.2%
1996	13,064	▲6.5%
1991	12,267	▲15.9%
1986	10,588	▲5.2%
1981	10,066	▲30.9%
1976	7,688	▲33.5%
1971	5,758	N/A

Mother tongue language (2021)

Language	Population	Pct (%)
French only	17,025	91.5%
English only	565	3.0%
Both English and French	260	1.4%
Other languages	665	3.6%

== Attractions ==
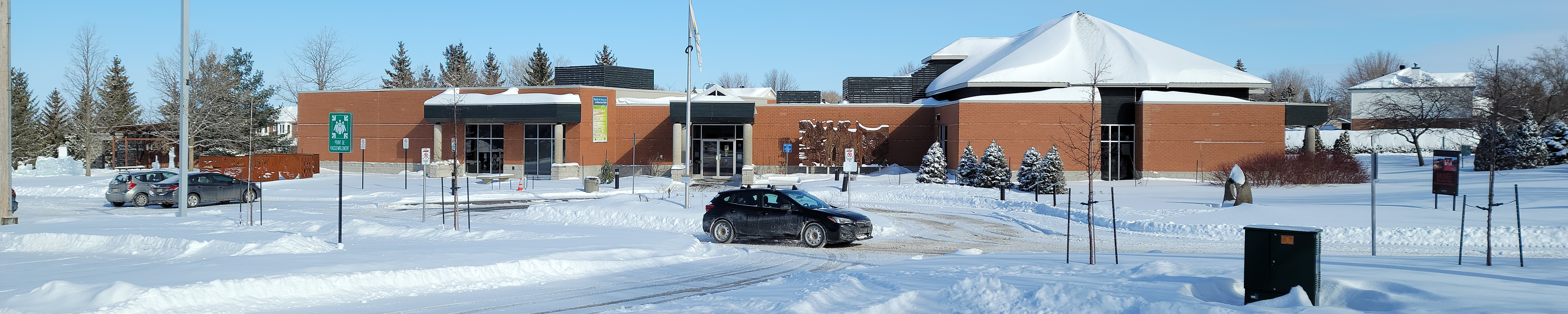
Museum of Fine Arts in February 2022

- The Gault Nature Reserve on Mont Saint-Hilaire includes over a thousand hectares of primeval forest. Owned by McGill University, the nature reserve is used for research and recreation.
- The Museum of Fine Arts (Le Musée des beaux-arts) of Mont-Saint-Hilaire is the major art museum on the south shore of the Saint Lawrence River. It was founded in 1993 to promote the work of regional artists Jordi Bonet, Paul-Émile Borduas and Ozias Leduc. Exhibitions also feature art from the area, such as Saint-Hilaire et les Automatistes in 1997, and Leduc, Borduas et le paysage de Saint-Hilaire in 2008, as well as other Quebec artists such as Jean Paul Lemieux and Nancy Petry.
- Art Station
- Art centre Ozias Leduc
- Manoir Rouville-Campbell
- Saint-Hilaire church

== Infrastructure ==
Reception arch in front of the town hall of Saint-Hilaire

Mont-Saint-Hilaire is served by the Mont-Saint-Hilaire commuter rail station on the Réseau de transport métropolitain's (RTM) Mont-Saint-Hilaire line. Local bus service is provided by the RTM's Vallée du Richelieu sector.

In 1864, Canada's worst rail disaster occurred here when a passenger train passed a red signal and fell off an open swing bridge into the Richelieu River, killing around 99 people.

== Education ==
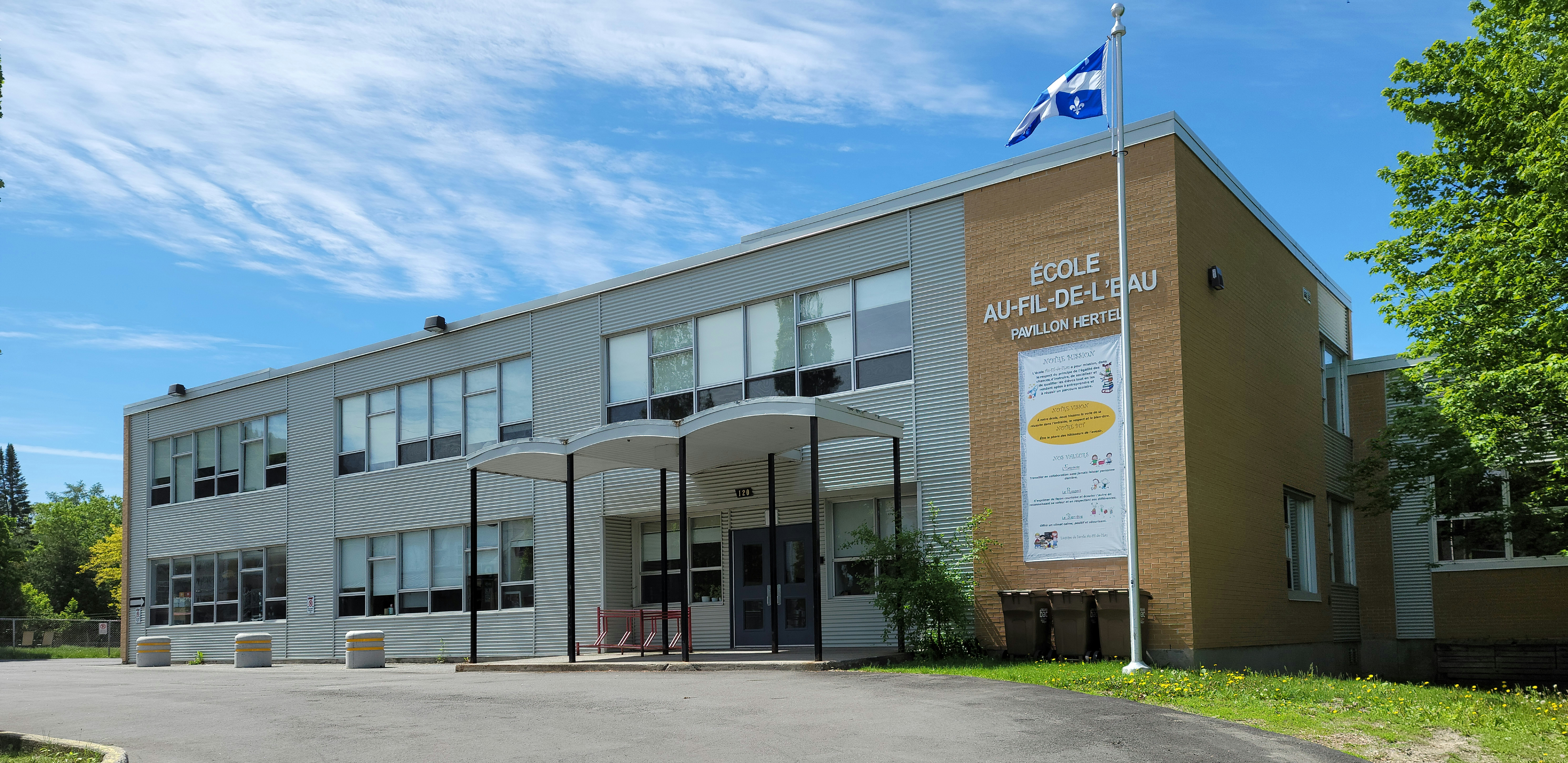
Pavillon Hertel de l'école Au-fil-de-l'eau-Pavillon de Mont-Saint-Hilaire.jpg

The town is home to 4 primary schools: Au-fil-de-l'eau (659 pupils), de l'Aquarelle (354 pupils) and de la Pommeraie (383 pupils) and Paul-Émile-Borduas. There are also 2 secondary schools, including Ozias-Leduc, with 1,480 students and Collège Saint-Hilaire, a private high school that receives students from the region.

The South Shore Protestant Regional School Board previously served the municipality.

== Notable people ==
- Louis Domingue, ice hockey player most recently for the Pittsburgh Penguins of the National Hockey League
- Laurent Duvernay-Tardif, football player most recently for the New York Jets of the National Football League
- Thomas Bertrand-Hudon, football player for the Saskatchewan Roughriders of the Canadian Football League

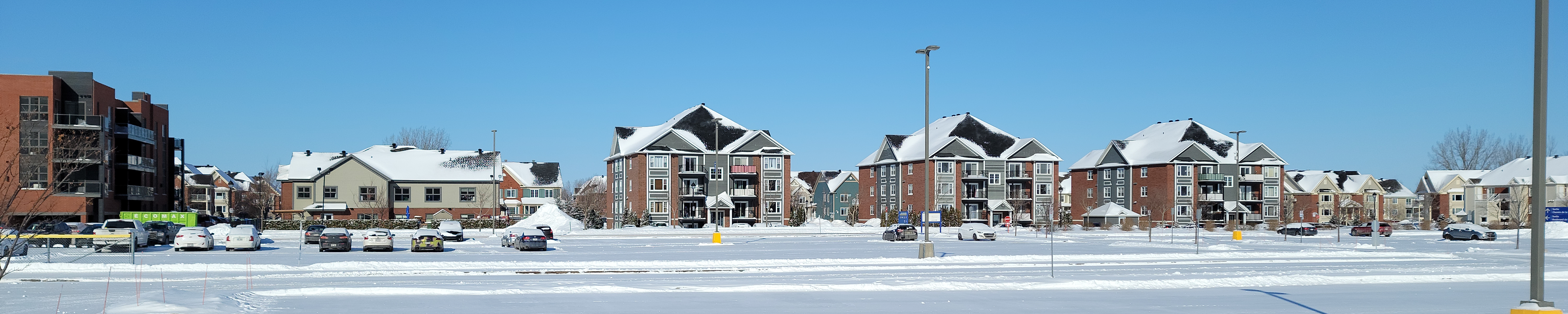
Residential area of rue du Grand Tronc, opposite the Saint-Hilaire train station (QC) in February 2022

== Photo gallery ==
View of Mont Saint-Hilaire, the intersection of boulevard Honorius-Charbonneau and rue du Centre-Civique

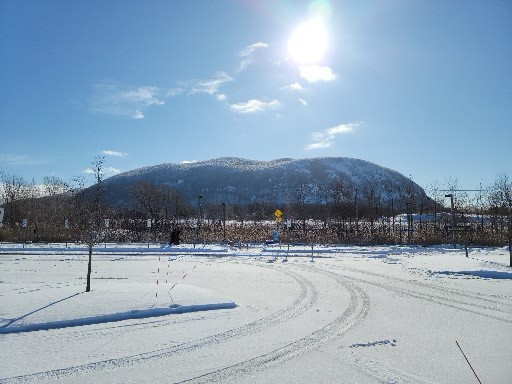
Mont Saint-Hilaire (Quebec) seen from the train station parking lot in winter 2022.

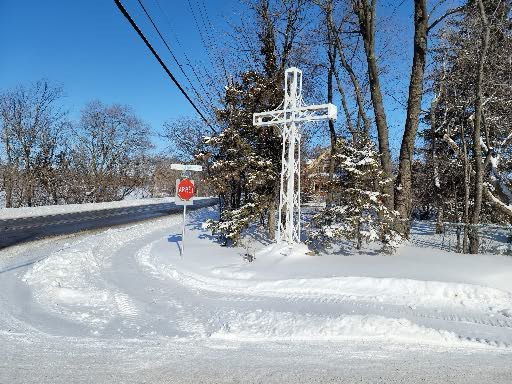
Wayside cross in Mont-Saint-Hilaire (corner of Chemin des Patriotes and rue de Lisbonne)

== See also ==
- List of cities in Quebec
- St-Hilaire train disaster
- Jordi-Bonet Bridge
