= 2026 Saint-Hyacinthe—Bagot—Acton federal by-election =

Pending Canadian federal by-election

- December 7, 2026

Riding of Saint-Hyacinthe—Bagot—Acton
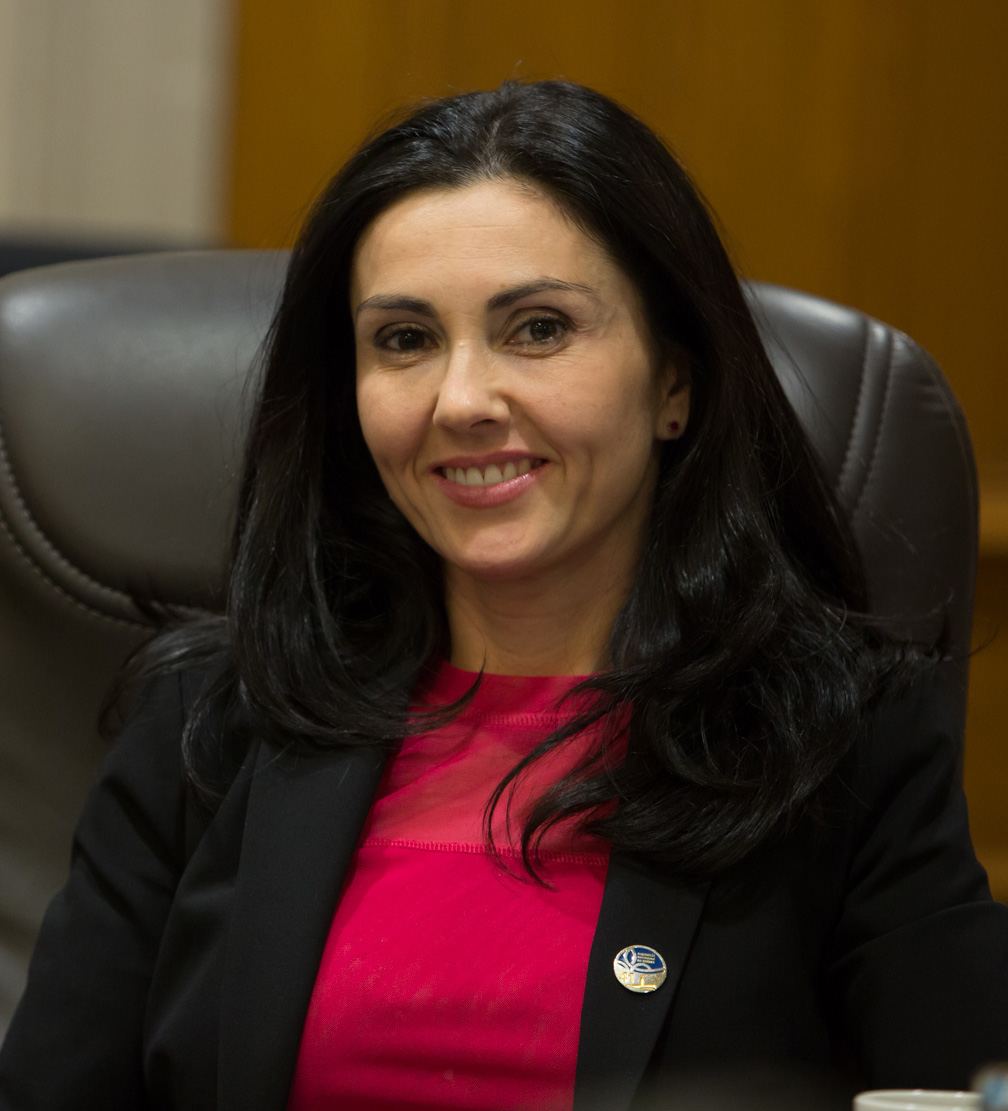

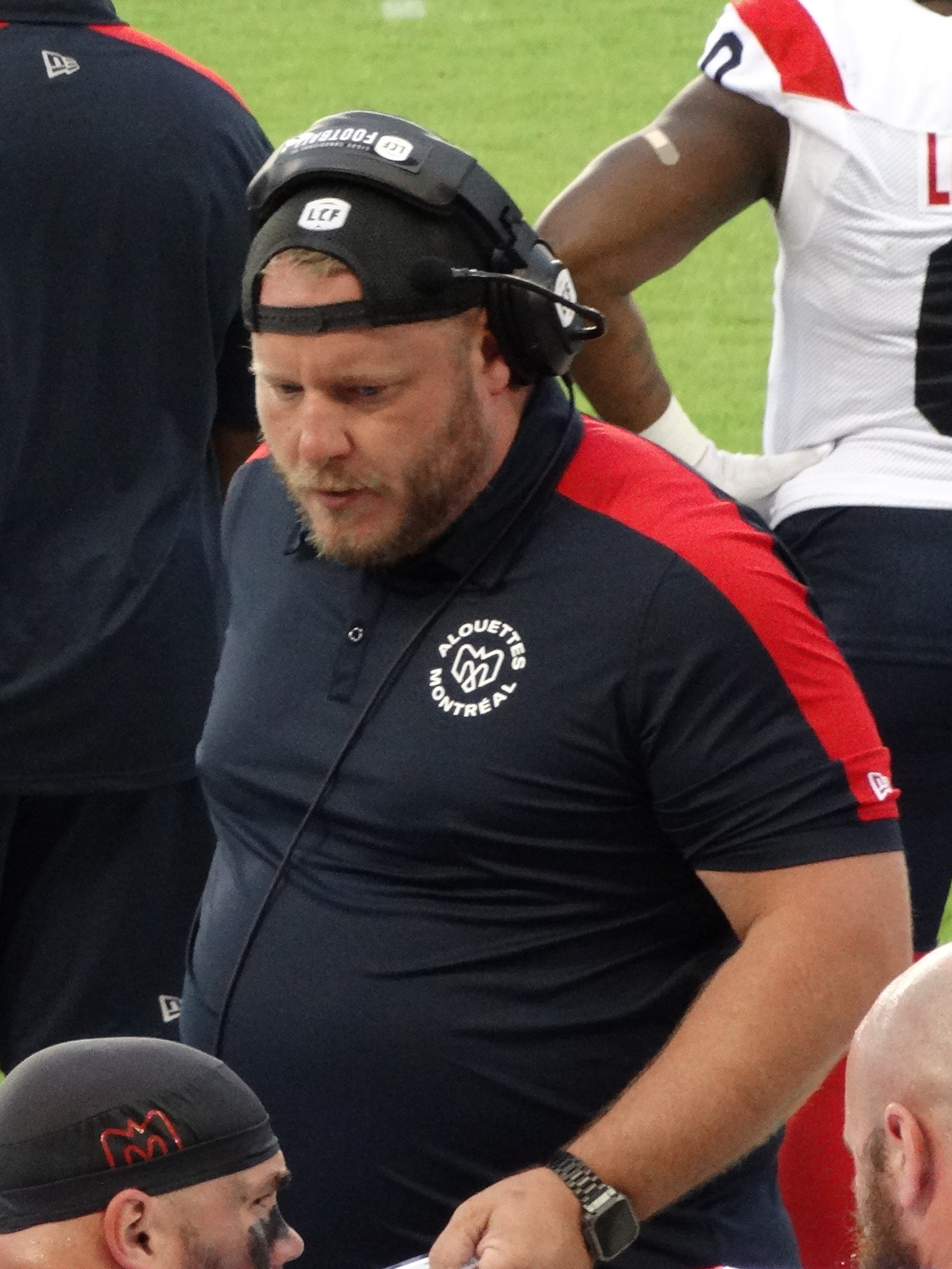
	BQ
Candidate	Caroline Émond	Chantal Soucy	Luc Brodeur-Jourdain
Party	Bloc Québécois	Liberal	Conservative
Last election	43.88%	33.64%	17.99%
Incumbent MP
Vacant (Note: The seat was held by Simon-Pierre Savard-Tremblay (Independent) until his resignation on June 19, 2026. Savard-Tremblay was elected as a member of the Bloc Québécois in the 2025 federal election, but left the caucus on May 28, 2026, to sit as an independent MP.)

A by-election will be held on December 7, 2026, to elect a member of Parliament (MP) to represent Saint-Hyacinthe—Bagot—Acton, Quebec, in the House of Commons for the remainder of the 45th Parliament following the resignation of independent MP Simon-Pierre Savard-Tremblay.

== Background ==
Bloc Québécois MP Simon-Pierre Savard-Tremblay was first elected to the House of Commons for Saint-Hyacinthe—Bagot—Acton in the 2019 Canadian federal election and was re-elected in 2021 and 2025.

On May 28, 2026, Savard-Tremblay left the Bloc Québécois caucus and sat as an independent MP after announcing that he would seek the Parti Québécois nomination in the provincial riding of Saint-Hyacinthe for the 2026 Quebec general election. He resigned from the House of Commons on June 19, 2026.

== Constituency ==
Saint-Hyacinthe—Bagot—Acton is a semi-rural federal riding in the Montérégie region of Quebec, centred on the regional county municipalities of Acton and Les Maskoutains. It includes the communities of Saint-Hyacinthe, Acton Vale, Saint-Pie, Sainte-Madeleine, and Saint-Dominique, along with surrounding smaller municipalities and rural areas.

== Timing ==
On June 22, 2026, Elections Canada announced that the chief electoral officer had received official notice from the speaker of the House of Commons that the seat was vacant. The latest date the by-election could have been held was February 1, 2027. On November 1, 2026, the election was called to be held on December 7.

== Candidates ==
=== Bloc Québécois ===
On July 16, 2026, the Bloc Québécois selected Caroline Émond to be its candidate. She is the former Quebec delegate-general to the European institutions in Brussels and former executive director of the International Dairy Federation. Julie Vignola, director of Savard-Tremblay's constituency office and former MP for Beauport—Limoilou had previously been reported to be seeking the nomination.

=== Liberal ===
On October 22, 2026, the Liberals announced that Chantal Soucy, the former Coalition Avenir Québec MNA for Saint-Hyacinthe would be their candidate.

=== Conservative ===
On August 21, 2026, it was announced that former Montreal Alouettes player and coach Luc Brodeur-Jourdain and current radio broadcaster will be the candidate for the Conservatives. He resides in Saint-Damase.

=== NDP ===
On October 31, 2026, the NDP announced former political staffer Mathieu Boisvert as their candidate. He lives in Sainte-Catherine, and previously ran for the NDP in La Prairie—Atateken in 2025 and Megantic—L'Erable in 2021 and 2019.

=== Green ===
The Green Party of Canada nominated 2025 candidate in the riding, Martin Grenier on October 30, 2026.

=== People's Party ===
The PPC nominated Joanne Voyer as their candidate.

== Result ==
Canadian federal by-election, December 7, 2026: Saint-Hyacinthe—Bagot—Acton Resignation of Simon-Pierre Savard-Tremblay
The by-election will be held on December 7, 2026.
Party	Candidate	Votes	%	±%
Bloc Québécois	Caroline Émond			
Liberal	Chantal Soucy			
Conservative	Luc Brodeur-Jourdain			
New Democratic	Mathieu Boisvert			
Green	Martin Grenier			
People's	Joanne Voyer			
Total valid votes				
Total rejected ballots				
Turnout				
Eligible voters		84,439		
Note:The Bloc Québécois won the seat in the 2025 general election, but Savard-Tremblay resigned from the caucus and sat as an independent MP on May 28, 2026.
Source: Elections Canada

== Previous result ==
2025 Canadian federal election: Saint-Hyacinthe—Bagot—Acton
Party	Candidate	Votes	%	±%	Expenditures
Bloc Québécois	Simon-Pierre Savard-Tremblay	25,447	43.88	–3.57	$60,384.29
Liberal	Mélanie Bédard	19,504	33.64	+10.95	$15,238.91
Conservative	Gaëtan Deschênes	10,431	17.99	+4.48	$17,122.71
New Democratic	Raymonde Plamondon	1,373	2.37	–9.27	$385.85
Green	Martin Grenier	800	1.38	N/A	$0.00
People's	Sylvain Pariseau	431	0.74	–1.98	$0.00
Total valid votes/expense limit		57,986	98.18	+0.83	$130,809.39
Total rejected ballots		1,072	1.82	–0.83	
Turnout		59,058	69.94	+4.52	
Eligible voters		84,439			
Bloc Québécois hold		Swing		–7.26	
Source: Elections Canada

== See also ==
- By-elections to the 45th Canadian Parliament
- Saint-Hyacinthe—Bagot—Acton
