= Women in the 39th Canadian Parliament =

Upon the dissolution of the 39th Canadian Parliament, 65 of the 308 seats (21.1 per cent) were held by women. Canada ranks 45th in the world in representation of women in the national lower house.

There were 64 women elected to Parliament in the 2006 election, and the victory of Bloc Québécois MP Ève-Mary Thaï Thi Lac in a byelection on September 17, 2007 brought the number to 65. This matched but did not exceed the all-time record of 65 female MPs elected in the 2004 election, and the number of women in the House returned to 64 with the resignation of Lucienne Robillard on January 25, 2008.

It nominally increased to a record 66 with the by-election wins of Martha Hall Findlay and Joyce Murray on March 17, 2008, although the resignation of Brenda Chamberlain from the House effective April 7, 2008 reduced the number of women back to 65 just one week after Findlay and Murray were sworn in as MPs.

== General notes ==
Fifteen of the 65 female MPs in the 39th Parliament, or 23.4 per cent, were elected for the first time in the 2006 election. The longest-serving female MPs were the Liberals Albina Guarnieri and Diane Marleau, both elected for the first time in the 1988 election. (New Democrat Dawn Black was also elected for the first time in that election; defeated in the 1993 election, she won her seat back in the 2006 election.)

From Confederation to the end of the 39th Parliament, a total of 193 female MPs sat in the House of Commons of Canada, 4.79 per cent of the 4,023 total MPs ever to serve. The 65 female MPs upon dissolution of the 39th Parliament constitute 33.6 per cent of this total.

The percentage of women in the House has remained more or less stable since 1993.

== By province ==
Province	Number of women MPs	Number of seats	Percentage of women
Newfoundland and Labrador	0	7	0%
Nova Scotia	1	11	9.1%
Prince Edward Island	0	4	0%
New Brunswick	0	10	0%
Quebec	23	75	30.6%
Ontario	23	106	21.7%
Manitoba	4	14	28.6%
Saskatchewan	2	14	14.3%
Alberta	2	28	7.1%
British Columbia	10	36	27.7%
Territories	1	3	33.3%
Totals	65	308	21.1%

== By party ==
Women were 23.3 per cent of all candidates in the 2006 election, and 24.8 per cent of candidates from the parties that won representation in Parliament.

The NDP nominated the largest proportion of women: more than a third of all New Democratic candidates were women, and nearly a third of all female candidates in the election were New Democrats. Furthermore, the NDP ended up with a higher proportion of women in its caucus than women candidates, meaning it ran women in ridings they could win – 18.8% of female MPs are New Democrats while the NDP holds only 9.4% of the seats in the House. As of 2007, the 12 women and 18 men currently sitting as New Democrats constitute the most gender-balanced party caucus ever elected to the Canadian House of Commons by a party with official party status.

However, it was with the Bloc Québécois that women candidates had the highest chance of winning: nearly three quarters of female Bloc candidates were elected. (As the Bloc runs candidates only in Quebec, the election of 50 Bloc MPs meant that any Bloc candidate had a 66.6% chance of winning.) 26.6% of female MPs are Bloquistes, while the Bloc holds only 16.2% of the seats.

As for the winning party, only 12% of Conservative candidates were women, and 11% of Conservative MPs are women, a total of fourteen; 21.5% of female MPs are Tories in a House that is 40.6% Conservative.

Party	Number of female candidates	Number of candidates	Percentage of candidates who are women	Percentage of women candidates to be elected	Current number of female MPs	Current number of MPs	Percentage of women
Conservative	38	308	12.3%	36.8%	14	126	11.1%
Liberal	79	308	25.6%	26.6%	21	96	21.8%
Bloc Québécois	23	75	30.7%	73.91%	18	49	36.7%
NDP	108	308	35.1%	11.1%	12	30	40.0%
Green	72	308	23.4%	0%	0	1	0%
Other	60	327	18.3%	0%	1	3	33.3%
Totals	380	1 634	23.3%	16.8%	65	308	21.1%

== Cabinet ==
The 27-member Cabinet contains six women ministers (22%), including one senator.

Of the 25 parliamentary secretaries, five (20%) are women.

Ten of the fourteen female government MPs (71%) are ministers or parliamentary secretaries.

== Senate ==
The 105-seat Senate currently has 90 sitting senators, of whom 32 (35.5%) are women. Stephen Harper has only made two Senate appointments to date, both men (Michael Fortier and Bert Brown). The previous prime minister, Paul Martin, made 17 Senate appointments, of whom six (35.3%) were women.

Two current Senators are members of the Cabinet; as noted above, one of them is a woman, Marjory LeBreton.

Name	Party	Province (Division)
Raynell Andreychuk	Conservative	Saskatchewan
Lise Bacon	Liberal	Quebec (De la Durantaye)
Catherine Callbeck	Liberal	Prince Edward Island
Pat Carney	Conservative	British Columbia
Sharon Carstairs	Liberal	Manitoba
Andrée Champagne	Conservative	Quebec (Grandville)
Maria Chaput	Liberal	Manitoba
Ethel Cochrane	Conservative	Newfoundland and Labrador
Joan Cook	Liberal	Newfoundland and Labrador
Anne Cools	Independent	Ontario (Toronto-Centre-York)
Jane Cordy	Liberal	Nova Scotia
Lillian Dyck	Independent NDP	Saskatchewan (North Battleford)
Joyce Fairbairn	Liberal	Alberta (Lethbridge)
Joan Fraser	Liberal	Quebec (De Lorimier)
Céline Hervieux-Payette	Liberal	Quebec (Bedford)
Libbe Hubley	Liberal	Prince Edward Island
Mobina Jaffer	Liberal	British Columbia
Janis Johnson	Conservative	Manitoba (Winnipeg - Interlake)
Marjory LeBreton	Conservative	Ontario
Rose-Marie Losier-Cool	Liberal	New Brunswick (Tracadie)
Sandra Lovelace Nicholas	Liberal	New Brunswick
Elaine McCoy	Progressive Conservative	Alberta (Calgary)
Pana Merchant	Liberal	Saskatchewan
Lorna Milne	Liberal	Ontario (Peel County)
Lucie Pépin	Liberal	Quebec (Shawinigan)
Marie Poulin	Liberal	Ontario
Vivienne Poy	Liberal	Ontario (Toronto)
Pierrette Ringuette	Liberal	New Brunswick
Nancy Ruth	Conservative	Ontario (Toronto)
Mira Spivak	Independent	Manitoba (Manitoba)
Claudette Tardif	Liberal	Alberta (Edmonton)
Marilyn Trenholme Counsell	Liberal	New Brunswick

== List of women MPs by province ==
Note: † indicates a cabinet minister, and * indicates a parliamentary secretary.

=== Newfoundland and Labrador ===
None

=== Nova Scotia ===
Name	Party	Riding
Alexa McDonough	NDP	Halifax

=== Prince Edward Island ===
None

=== New Brunswick ===
None

=== Quebec ===
Name	Party	Riding
Vivian Barbot	Bloc Québécois	Papineau
France Bonsant	Bloc Québécois	Compton—Stanstead
Sylvie Boucher*	Conservative	Beauport—Limoilou
Diane Bourgeois	Bloc Québécois	Terrebonne—Blainville
Paule Brunelle	Bloc Québécois	Trois-Rivières
Claude DeBellefeuille	Bloc Québécois	Beauharnois—Salaberry
Nicole Demers	Bloc Québécois	Laval
Johanne Deschamps	Bloc Québécois	Laurentides—Labelle
Meili Faille	Bloc Québécois	Vaudreuil—Soulanges
Raymonde Folco	Liberal	Laval—Les Îles
Carole Freeman	Bloc Québécois	Châteauguay—Saint-Constant
Christiane Gagnon	Bloc Québécois	Québec
Monique Guay	Bloc Québécois	Rivière-du-Nord
Marlene Jennings	Liberal	Notre-Dame-de-Grâce—Lachine
Francine Lalonde	Bloc Québécois	La Pointe-de-l'Île
Carole Lavallée	Bloc Québécois	Saint-Bruno—Saint-Hubert
Maria Mourani	Bloc Québécois	Ahuntsic
Pauline Picard	Bloc Québécois	Drummond
Lucienne Robillard ‡	Liberal	Westmount—Ville-Marie
Caroline St-Hilaire	Bloc Québécois	Longueuil—Pierre-Boucher
Ève-Mary Thaï Thi Lac ‡	Bloc Québécois	Saint-Hyacinthe—Bagot
Louise Thibault	Independent	Rimouski-Neigette—Témiscouata—Les Basques
Josée Verner†	Conservative	Louis-Saint-Laurent

‡ Ève-Mary Thaï Thi Lac was elected to the House in a by-election on September 17, 2007. Lucienne Robillard resigned from the House on January 25, 2008.

=== Ontario ===
Name	Party	Riding
Sue Barnes	Liberal	London West
Colleen Beaumier	Liberal	Brampton West
Carolyn Bennett	Liberal	St. Paul's
Bonnie Brown	Liberal	Oakville
Brenda Chamberlain ‡	Liberal	Guelph
Chris Charlton	NDP	Hamilton Mountain
Olivia Chow	NDP	Trinity—Spadina
Pat Davidson	Conservative	Sarnia—Lambton
Ruby Dhalla	Liberal	Brampton—Springdale
Diane Finley†	Conservative	Haldimand—Norfolk
Cheryl Gallant	Conservative	Renfrew—Nipissing—Pembroke
Albina Guarnieri	Liberal	Mississauga East—Cooksville
Helena Guergis*	Conservative	Simcoe—Grey
Martha Hall Findlay ‡	Liberal	Willowdale
Susan Kadis	Liberal	Thornhill
Diane Marleau	Liberal	Sudbury
Irene Mathyssen	NDP	London—Fanshawe
Maria Minna	Liberal	Beaches—East York
Peggy Nash	NDP	Parkdale—High Park
Bev Oda†	Conservative	Durham
Yasmin Ratansi	Liberal	Don Valley East
Karen Redman	Liberal	Kitchener Centre
Judy Sgro	Liberal	York West
Belinda Stronach	Liberal	Newmarket—Aurora

‡ Martha Hall Findlay was elected to the House in a by-election on March 17, 2008. Brenda Chamberlain has announced her resignation from the House effective April 7, 2008.

=== Manitoba ===
Name	Party	Riding
Tina Keeper	Liberal	Churchill
Anita Neville	Liberal	Winnipeg South Centre
Joy Smith	Conservative	Kildonan—St. Paul
Judy Wasylycia-Leis	NDP	Winnipeg North

=== Saskatchewan ===
Name	Party	Riding
Carol Skelton†	Conservative	Saskatoon—Rosetown—Biggar
Lynne Yelich*	Conservative	Blackstrap

=== Alberta ===
Name	Party	Riding
Diane Ablonczy*	Conservative	Calgary—Nose Hill
Rona Ambrose†	Conservative	Edmonton—Spruce Grove

=== British Columbia ===
Name	Party	Riding
Catherine Bell	NDP	Vancouver Island North
Dawn Black	NDP	New Westminster—Coquitlam
Jean Crowder	NDP	Nanaimo—Cowichan
Libby Davies	NDP	Vancouver East
Hedy Fry	Liberal	Vancouver Centre
Nina Grewal	Conservative	Fleetwood—Port Kells
Betty Hinton*	Conservative	Kamloops—Thompson—Cariboo
Joyce Murray ‡	Liberal	Vancouver Quadra
Penny Priddy	NDP	Surrey North
Denise Savoie	NDP	Victoria

‡ Joyce Murray was elected to the House in a by-election on March 17, 2008.

=== Territories ===
Name	Party	Riding
Nancy Karetak-Lindell	Liberal	Nunavut

== See also ==
- Women in the 40th Canadian Parliament
- Women in Canadian politics
- Women in Canadian provincial and territorial legislatures
