= Brigitte Sansoucy =

Canadian politician

Member of Parliament for Saint-Hyacinthe—Bagot
- In office October 19, 2015 – September 11, 2019
- Preceded by: Marie-Claude Morin
- Succeeded by: Simon-Pierre Savard-Tremblay

Saint-Hyacinthe Municipal Councillor
- In office November 16, 2009 – November 2, 2015
- Preceded by: Émilien Pelletier
- Succeeded by: Annie Pelletier
- Constituency: District 7 (Saint-Sacrement)

Personal details
- Born: 1963 (age 62–63)
- Party: New Democratic Party
- Children: 4
- Profession: Regional Development Coordinator

Brigitte Sansoucy is a Canadian politician who was elected as a Member of Parliament in the House of Commons of Canada to represent the federal electoral district Saint-Hyacinthe—Bagot during the 2015 Canadian federal election and served until she was defeated in 2019.

Prior to her election, she was a municipal councillor in the city of Saint-Hyacinthe and also was an Advisor to the Quebec Ministry of Agriculture, Fisheries and Food.

== Biography ==
Brigitte Sansoucy holds a bachelor's degree in business administration as well as a master's degree in public administration from the École nationale d'administration publique. Until 2015, she was the Advisor and Deputy Regional Director of Development of the East Montérégie in the Department of Agriculture, Fisheries and Food of Quebec.

From 1996 to 2009, she ran a shelter for youth in distress, the Auberge du Coeur Le Baluchon, located in Saint-Hyacinthe.

=== Political career ===
Sansoucy was first the New Democratic Party candidate during a by-election in 2007 in the riding of Saint-Hyacinthe—Bagot. During this election, she finished third with about 8% of the votes. In the 2008 Canadian federal election she finished again in third place. Also that year, she became national vice president of the NDP, being reconfirmed in this position in 2011 and 2013. She was a municipal councillor in the town of Saint-Hyacinthe from 2009 up until her election to the Canadian House of Commons in 2015; she was election in the municipal elections of 2009 and re-elected in 2013.

In the 2011 federal election, Sansoucy was not a candidate, but the riding was won by New Democrat candidate Marie-Claude Morin. When Morin made the decision in 2014 not to stand for re-election, Sansoucy was asked to run. She officially became a candidate in December 2014 and was elected to Ottawa as a Member of Parliament on October 19, 2015.

During her term, she was critic for her party for employment and social development as well as in infrastructure and communities. She was also Vice-Chair of the Standing Committee on Human Resources, Skills Development, Social Development and the Status of Persons with Disabilities.

In February 2016, Sansoucy introduced Bill C-245, An Act concerning the development of a national poverty reduction strategy in Canada. The bill was defeated at second reading by a vote of 52 For and 238 Against.

In the 2019 federal election, Brigitte Sansoucy was defeated by Bloc Québécois candidate Simon-Pierre Savard-Tremblay.

== Electoral record ==
=== Federal ===
2021 Canadian federal election
Party	Candidate	Votes	%	±%	Expenditures
Bloc Québécois	Simon-Pierre Savard-Tremblay	25,165	47.5	+6.1	$42,791.75
Liberal	Caroline-Joan Boucher	12,030	22.7	+1.4	$13,920.17
Conservative	André Lepage	7,166	13.5	-0.9	$48,511.65
New Democratic	Brigitte Sansoucy	6,170	11.6	-6.8	$17,351.86
People's	Sylvain Pariseau	1,445	2.7	+1.8	$0.00
Free	Sébastien Desautels	1,055	2.0	N/A	$1,439.69
Total valid votes/Expense limit		53,031	97.4	–	$112,852.48
Total rejected ballots		1,439	2.6		
Turnout		54,470	65.6		
Eligible voters		83,086			
Bloc Québécois hold		Swing		+2.4	
Source: Elections Canada

2019 Canadian federal election: Saint-Hyacinthe—Bagot
Party	Candidate	Votes	%	±%	Expenditures
Bloc Québécois	Simon-Pierre Savard-Tremblay	23,143	41.4	+17.1	$26,447.17
Liberal	René Vincelette	11,903	21.3	-6.3	$49,472.90
New Democratic	Brigitte Sansoucy	10,297	18.4	-10.3	$48,330.94
Conservative	Bernard Barré	8,062	14.4	-2.3	$44,085.44
Green	Sabrina Huet-Côté	2,031	3.6	+1.3	none listed
People's	Jean-François Bélanger	478	0.9	–	none listed
Total valid votes/expense limit		55,914	97.57		
Total rejected ballots		1,391	2.43	+0.25	
Turnout		57,305	70.1	+1.3	
Eligible voters		81,792			
Bloc Québécois gain from New Democratic		Swing		+11.7	
Source: Elections Canada

2015 Canadian federal election
Party	Candidate	Votes	%	±%	Expenditures
New Democratic	Brigitte Sansoucy	15,578	28.7	-23.7	–
Liberal	René Vincelette	14,980	27.6	+22.2	–
Bloc Québécois	Michel Filion	13,200	24.3	-0.3	–
Conservative	Réjean Léveillé	9,098	16.7	+1.0	–
Green	Lise Durand	1,243	2.3	+0.4	–
Independent	Ugo Ménard	270	0.5	–	–
Total valid votes/Expense limit		54,369	100.0		$216,387.98
Total rejected ballots		1,214	2.18	+0.58	
Turnout		55,583	68.80	+2.20	
Eligible voters		80,787			
Source: Elections Canada
New Democratic hold		Swing		-22.95	

2008 Canadian federal election
Party	Candidate	Votes	%	±%	Expenditures
Bloc Québécois	Ève-Mary Thaï Thi Lac	22,719	47.3	+5.2	$42,031
Conservative	René Vincelette	10,203	21.2	-16.2	$72,405
New Democratic	Brigitte Sansoucy	6,721	14.0	+6.0	$2,914
Liberal	Denise Tremblay	6,638	13.8	+6.4	$577
Green	Jacques Tétreault	1,771	3.7	–	$2,351
Total valid votes/Expense limit		48,052	100.0	$83,812	
Bloc Québécois hold		Swing		+10.7	

Canadian federal by-election, September 17, 2007
Party	Candidate	Votes	%	±%	Expenditures
Bloc Québécois	Ève-Mary Thaï Thi Lac	13,443	42.1	-13.9	$67,621
Conservative	Bernard Barré	11,965	37.5	+12.7	$78,919
New Democratic	Brigitte Sansoucy	2,538	7.9	+2.5	$13,886
Liberal	Jean Caumartin	2,379	7.4	-2.4	$29,337
Green	Jacques Tétreault	1,169	3.7	-0.2	$2,022
Rhinoceros	Christian Willie Vanasse	384	1.2	–	$303
Canadian Action	Michel St-Onge	61	0.2	–	$706
Total valid votes/Expense limit		31,949	100.0	$81,624	
By-election due to the resignation of Yvan Loubier.
Bloc Québécois hold		Swing		-13.3	

=== Municipal ===
Saint-Hyacinthe Municipal Election 2013, Municipal Councillor, Ward 7
Candidate	Votes	%
Brigitte Sansoucy	843	56.09
Danny LaRoche	512	34.07
Marcel Delage	148	9.85
Total	1,503	100.00

Saint-Hyacinthe Municipal Election 2009, Municipal Councillor, Ward 7
Candidate	Votes	%
Brigitte Sansoucy	684	52.98
Danny LaRoche	607	47.02
Total	1,291	100.00
