= Women in the 40th Canadian Parliament =

The 40th Canadian Parliament contained a record number of female Members of Parliament, with 69 women elected to the House of Commons of Canada in the 2008 federal election. However, this represented just 22 per cent of the 308 total MPs, and only a modest gain over the 65 women in the 39th Canadian Parliament.

With 23 women elected to the House for the first time, the 2008 election also increased the number of female MPs who have sat in the House of Commons of Canada since Confederation to 216, from 193 at the end of the 39th Parliament. Nine incumbent women MPs did not stand for re-election in 2008, and ten incumbent women were defeated on election night.

In total, 445 women ran in the 2008 election. The record for female participation in a federal election continues to be held by the 1993 election, in which 476 women ran as candidates, but the 2008 election had the second largest slate of female candidates in Canadian history.

By contrast, the United States House of Representatives has elected only a marginally larger number of women despite having 127 more seats. The 2008 Congressional elections saw 74 women elected to the House of Representatives, for an all-time total of 229.

At the dissolution of the 40th Parliament, the number of women sitting as federal MPs stood at 67, as two women elected in 2008 subsequently resigned from the House: Dawn Black on April 13, 2009 and Judy Wasylycia-Leis on April 30, 2010. Women did not win any of the by-elections to the 40th Canadian Parliament.

== Party standings ==
Party	Women candidates	Women elected	Women as % of caucus	% of women candidates elected
Liberal	113	19	24.67	16.81
New Democrats	104	12	32.43	11.53
Bloc Québécois	21	15	30.00	75.00
Conservative	63	23	15.97	36.50
Table source:

The 2008 election was the first time in Canadian electoral history that one of the major parties nominated more female candidates than the New Democrats or their predecessor, the Co-operative Commonwealth Federation.

== By province ==
Province	Number of women MPs	Number of seats	Percentage of women
Newfoundland and Labrador	2	7	28.6%
Nova Scotia	1	11	9.1%
Prince Edward Island	1	4	25.0%
New Brunswick	1	10	10.0%
Quebec	21	75	28.0%
Ontario	21	106	19.8%
Manitoba	6	14	42.8%
Saskatchewan	2	14	14.3%
Alberta	3	28	10.7%
British Columbia	10	36	27.7%
Territories	1	3	33.3%
Totals	69	308	22.4%

== Members ==
The longest-serving female MP currently in the House of Commons is Albina Guarnieri, who was first elected in the 1988 election and surpassed 20 years in office in December 2008. In the 39th Parliament, Guarnieri was tied for this status with Diane Marleau, who was first elected in 1988 but was defeated in the 2008 election.

† denotes women who were newly elected in the 2008 election and are serving their first term in office. Names in boldface denote ministers in the current Cabinet of Canada.

Name	Party	Electoral district	Notes
**Diane Ablonczy**	Conservative	Calgary—Nose Hill
**Leona Aglukkaq**†	Conservative	Nunavut
**Rona Ambrose**	Conservative	Edmonton—Spruce Grove
Niki Ashton†	New Democrat	Churchill
Josée Beaudin†	Bloc Québécois	Saint-Lambert
Carolyn Bennett	Liberal	St. Paul's
Dawn Black	New Democrat	New Westminster—Coquitlam	Resigned April 13, 2009.
Kelly Block†	Conservative	Saskatoon—Rosetown—Biggar
France Bonsant	Bloc Québécois	Compton—Stanstead
Sylvie Boucher	Conservative	Beauport—Limoilou
Diane Bourgeois	Bloc Québécois	Terrebonne—Blainville
Lois Brown†	Conservative	Newmarket—Aurora
Paule Brunelle	Bloc Québécois	Trois-Rivières
Dona Cadman†	Conservative	Surrey North
Chris Charlton	New Democrat	Hamilton Mountain
Olivia Chow	New Democrat	Trinity—Spadina
Siobhán Coady†	Liberal	St. John's South—Mount Pearl
Bonnie Crombie†	Liberal	Mississauga—Streetsville
Jean Crowder	New Democrat	Nanaimo—Cowichan
Pat Davidson	Conservative	Sarnia—Lambton
Libby Davies	New Democrat	Vancouver East
Claude DeBellefeuille	Bloc Québécois	Beauharnois—Salaberry
Nicole Demers	Bloc Québécois	Laval
Johanne Deschamps	Bloc Québécois	Laurentides—Labelle
Ruby Dhalla	Liberal	Brampton—Springdale
Kirsty Duncan†	Liberal	Etobicoke North
Linda Duncan†	New Democrat	Edmonton—Strathcona
Meili Faille	Bloc Québécois	Vaudreuil—Soulanges
**Diane Finley**	Conservative	Haldimand—Norfolk
Raymonde Folco	Liberal	Laval—Les Îles
Judy Foote†	Liberal	Random—Burin—St. George's
Carole Freeman	Bloc Québécois	Châteauguay—Saint-Constant
Hedy Fry	Liberal	Vancouver Centre
Christiane Gagnon	Bloc Québécois	Québec
Cheryl Gallant	Conservative	Renfrew—Nipissing—Pembroke
Shelly Glover†	Conservative	Saint Boniface
Nina Grewal	Conservative	Fleetwood—Port Kells
Albina Guarnieri	Liberal	Mississauga East—Cooksville
Monique Guay	Bloc Québécois	Rivière-du-Nord
Helena Guergis	Conservative	Simcoe—Grey
Martha Hall Findlay	Liberal	Willowdale
Candice Hoeppner†	Conservative	Portage—Lisgar
Carol Hughes†	New Democrat	Algoma—Manitoulin—Kapuskasing
Marlene Jennings	Liberal	Notre-Dame-de-Grâce—Lachine
Francine Lalonde	Bloc Québécois	La Pointe-de-l'Île
Carole Lavallée	Bloc Québécois	Saint-Bruno—Saint-Hubert
Megan Leslie†	New Democrat	Halifax
Irene Mathyssen	New Democrat	London—Fanshawe
Cathy McLeod†	Conservative	Kamloops—Thompson—Cariboo
Alexandra Mendès†	Liberal	Brossard—La Prairie
Maria Minna	Liberal	Beaches—East York
Maria Mourani	Bloc Québécois	Ahuntsic
Joyce Murray	Liberal	Vancouver Quadra
Anita Neville	Liberal	Winnipeg South Centre
**Bev Oda**	Conservative	Durham
Tilly O'Neill-Gordon†	Conservative	Miramichi
**Lisa Raitt**†	Conservative	Halton
Yasmin Ratansi	Liberal	Don Valley East
Denise Savoie	New Democrat	Victoria
Judy Sgro	Liberal	York West
**Gail Shea**†	Conservative	Egmont
Michelle Simson†	Liberal	Scarborough Southwest
Joy Smith	Conservative	Kildonan—St. Paul
Ève-Mary Thaï Thi Lac	Bloc Québécois	Saint-Hyacinthe—Bagot
**Josée Verner**	Conservative	Louis-Saint-Laurent
Judy Wasylycia-Leis	New Democrat	Winnipeg North	Resigned April 30, 2010.
Alice Wong†	Conservative	Richmond
**Lynne Yelich**	Conservative	Blackstrap
Lise Zarac†	Liberal	LaSalle—Émard
