= Claude Wagner =

Canadian politician and judge (1925–1979)

The Honourable Claude Wagner PC QC

Canadian Senator from Kennebec
- In office April 21, 1978 – July 11, 1979
- Nominated by: Pierre Trudeau
- Appointed by: Jules Léger
- Preceded by: Jean-Pierre Côté
- Succeeded by: Guy Charbonneau

Member of Parliament for Saint-Hyacinthe
- In office October 30, 1972 – April 20, 1978
- Preceded by: Théogène Ricard
- Succeeded by: Marcel Ostiguy

Quebec Minister of Justice (Note: Office known as "Attorney General for Quebec" from 1867 to 1965.)
- In office August 31, 1964 – June 16, 1966
- Premier: Jean Lesage
- Preceded by: René Hamel
- Succeeded by: Jean-Jacques Bertrand

Quebec Solicitor General
- In office August 31, 1964 – October 30, 1964
- Premier: Jean Lesage
- Preceded by: Jacques Miquelon (1960)
- Succeeded by: Armand Maltais (1968)

Member of the National Assembly of Quebec for Verdun
- In office October 5, 1964 – February 16, 1970
- Preceded by: George O'Reilly
- Succeeded by: Lucien Caron

Personal details
- Born: April 4, 1925 Shawinigan, Quebec, Canada
- Died: July 11, 1979 (aged 54) Montreal, Quebec, Canada
- Party: Progressive Conservative (from 1972)
- Other political affiliations: Quebec Liberal (before 1972)
- Spouse: Gisèle Normandeau
- Children: Richard Wagner

Claude Wagner PC QC (April 4, 1925 – July 11, 1979) was a Canadian judge and politician in the province of Quebec, Canada. Throughout his career, he was a Crown prosecutor, professor of criminal law and judge.

== Life and career ==
Wagner was born in Shawinigan, Quebec, as the son of Corona (née Saint-Arnaud) and Benjamin Wagner. His father, a violinist, was an immigrant from the city of Sucheva in the region of Bukovina, Romania. His mother was French-Canadian.

In 1963, Wagner was appointed as a Sessions Court judge. Subsequently, he was elected to the Legislative Assembly of Quebec in a by-election in Montréal-Verdun on October 5, 1964, and was re-elected in the 1966 general election in Verdun. He earned a "law-and-order" reputation when he served successively as Solicitor General, Attorney General, and Minister of Justice from its creation in 1965 to 1966 in the government of Quebec Premier Jean Lesage.

After losing the 1970 Quebec Liberal Party leadership election to Robert Bourassa, Wagner left electoral politics to return to the bench, receiving appointment once more as a Sessions Court judge. He then entered federal politics, and was elected as the Progressive Conservative Member of Parliament for Saint-Hyacinthe in the 1972 federal election, serving in the 29th Parliament as an Opposition MP. He was re-elected in the 1974 election, and after Robert Stanfield resigned as leader of the party, he stood as a candidate at the Progressive Conservative leadership convention of 1976.

Wagner attracted support from Tories who believed that having a leader from Quebec would enable the party to break the federal Liberal Party's stranglehold on the province and from right-wing Tories attracted by his law-and-order reputation. He was hurt by revelations of a slush fund that was funded by supporters so that he would be financially solvent if he lost in 1972. Wagner led on the first three ballots of the convention, but Joe Clark won the leadership by 65 votes out of 2,309 on the fourth ballot.

In 1978, he was nominated to the Senate of Canada by Prime Minister Pierre Trudeau; he accepted the appointment and sat as a Progressive Conservative. One reason for his departure from the House of Commons was that he could not get along well with Clark. He died of cancer the next year at the age of 54, during Clark's brief premiership.

His son, Richard, also pursued a career in the judiciary, eventually being nominated to sit on the Supreme Court of Canada in 2012 by Prime Minister Stephen Harper and becoming Chief Justice of Canada in 2017 during the government of Justin Trudeau. On January 21, 2021, Richard Wagner assumed the role of Administrator of Canada, following a workplace review of Rideau Hall and the resignation of Julie Payette as Governor General of Canada, pending the appointment of a new Governor General.

== See also ==
- Quebec federalism
- List of Mauriciens
