= Luc Brodeur-Jourdain =

Canadian gridiron football coach (born 1983)

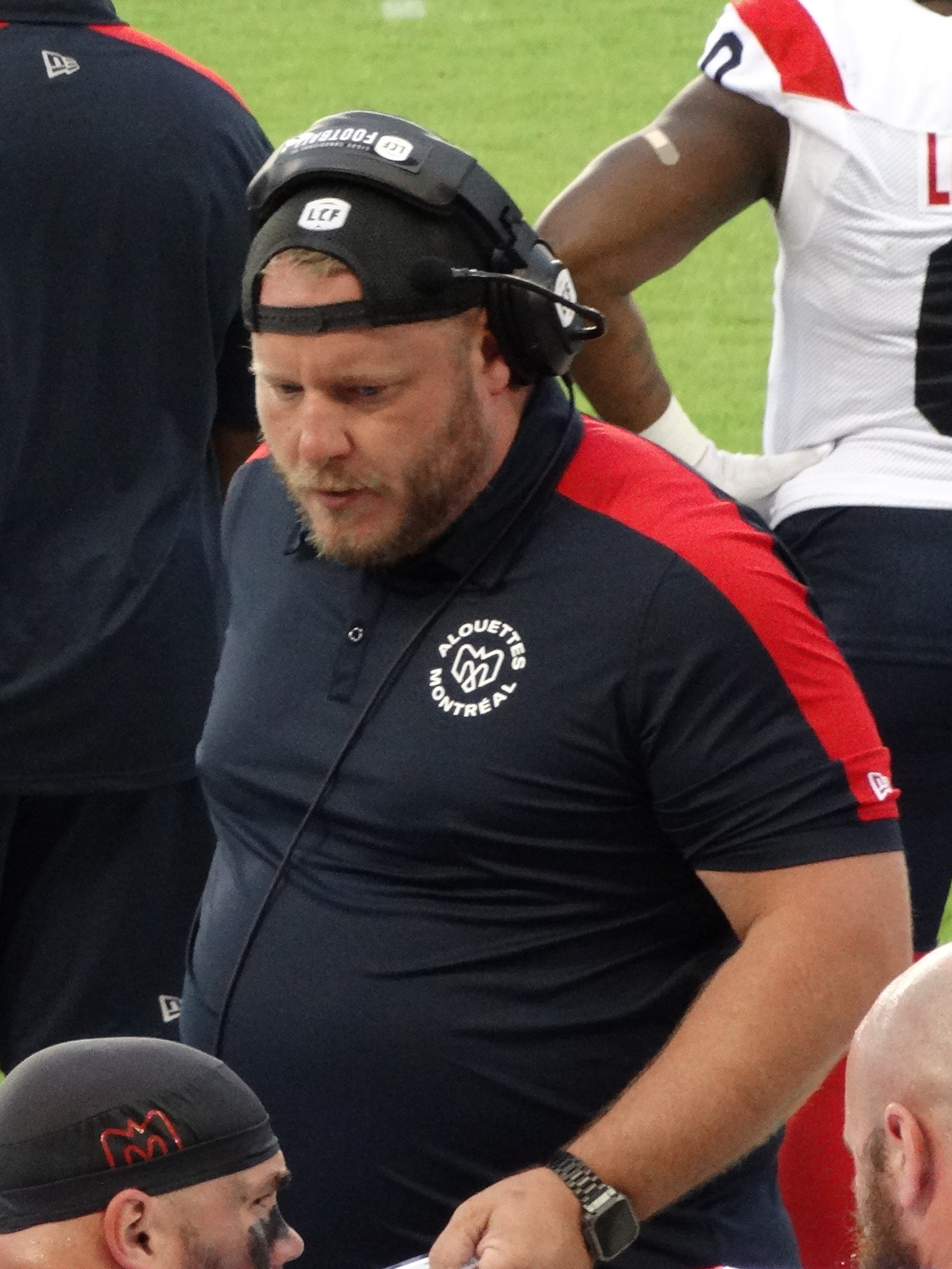
- Brodeur-Jourdain with the Montreal Alouettes in 2024

Personal information
- Born: March 17, 1983 (age 43); Saint-Hyacinthe, Quebec, Canada
- Listed height: 6 ft 2 in (1.88 m)
- Listed weight: 309 lb (140 kg)

Career information
- Position: Offensive lineman (No. 58)
- Cégep: Saint-Jean-sur-Richelieu
- University: Laval
- CFL draft: 2008: 6th round, 48th overall pick

Career history

Playing
- 2009–2019: Montreal Alouettes

Coaching
- 2019–2020: Montreal Alouettes (AC)
- 2021–2025: Montreal Alouettes (OLC)

Awards and highlights
- 3× Grey Cup champion (2009, 2010, 2023); 3× Vanier Cup champion (2004, 2006, 2008); CFL All-Star (2012); 2× CFL East All-Star (2012, 2014)
- Stats at CFL.ca

Other information

Personal details
- Citizenship: Canadian
- Party: Conservative
- Education: Université Laval; Cégep de Saint-Jean-sur-Richelieu

Luc Brodeur-Jourdain (born March 17, 1983) is a Canadian football former player and offensive line coach, with the Montreal Alouettes of the Canadian Football League (CFL). Prior to his coaching career, he played in 11 seasons as an offensive lineman for the Alouettes. He was a member of both the 97th Grey Cup and 98th Grey Cup championship teams as a player and won the 110th Grey Cup as a coach, all with the Alouettes.

== Amateur career ==
Brodeur-Jourdain played for the Géants du CÉGEP de Saint-Jean-Sur-Richelieu at the collégial AAA level. He then played CIS football for the Laval Rouge et Or from 2004 to 2008. He was a Vanier Cup champion with the Rouge et Or in 2004, 2006, and 2008.

== Professional career ==
Brodeur-Jourdain was drafted by the Alouettes in the sixth round with the last pick of the 2008 CFL draft. He returned to play his final year of university eligibility in 2008 and re-joined the Alouettes in 2009. After sitting out week 1, he played in his first professional game in week 2 on July 9, 2009, against the Edmonton Eskimos. He played in 17 regular season games with seven starts in 2009 and played in both post-season games as he finished the year as a Grey Cup champion following the Alouettes' victory in the 97th Grey Cup game. In his sophomore season, Brodeur-Jourdain played in all 18 regular season games, starting in 10, as well as both post-season games as he repeated as a champion with a 98th Grey Cup victory.

Brodeur-Jourdain was named the Alouettes' Most Outstanding Lineman in 2013 and was a CFL all-star in 2012. He was also an East division all-star in 2012 and 2014. Prior to the Alouettes' 2019 Week 4 match against the Hamilton Tiger-Cats, Brodeur-Jourdain announced his intention to retire following the game. He played in 12 seasons for the Alouettes where he played in 168 regular season games and started in 127 games.

== Coaching career ==
A few days after playing in his last game and retiring, Brodeur-Jourdain was hired as an assistant offensive line coach for the Alouettes. He was promoted to offensive line coach on December 2, 2020. Brodeur-Jourdain stepped down in 2025.

== Broadcasting career ==
In May 2026, Brodeur-Jourdain became the new French-language colour commentator on the Montreal Alouettes radio broadcast team.

== Political career ==
In August 2026, Brodeur-Jourdain was nominated by the Conservative Party of Canada as their candidate in a by-election in Saint-Hyacinthe—Bagot—Acton.

=== Electoral record ===
Canadian federal by-election, December 7, 2026: Saint-Hyacinthe—Bagot—Acton Resignation of Simon-Pierre Savard-Tremblay
The by-election will be held on December 7, 2026.
Party	Candidate	Votes	%	±%
Bloc Québécois	Caroline Émond			
Liberal	Chantal Soucy			
Conservative	Luc Brodeur-Jourdain			
New Democratic	Mathieu Boisvert			
Green	Martin Grenier			
People's	TBD			
Total valid votes				
Total rejected ballots				
Turnout				
Eligible voters		84,439		
Note:The Bloc Québécois won the seat in the 2025 general election, but Savard-Tremblay resigned from the caucus and sat as an independent MP on May 28, 2026.
Source: Elections Canada
