= Joseph Morin =

Joseph Morin may refer to:

- Joseph Morin (Saint-Hyacinthe MLA) (1854–1930), member of the Legislative Assembly of Quebec for Saint-Hyacinthe electoral district
- Joseph Morin (Charlevoix MLA) (1854–1915), member of the Legislative Assembly of Quebec for Charlevoix electoral district
