= Joseph Fontaine =

Canadian politician (1900–1986)

Member of Parliament for Saint-Hyacinthe—Bagot
- In office June 1945 – June 1957

Personal details
- Born: Joseph Louis Rosario Fontaine; 26 August 1900 Saint-Damase, Quebec
- Died: 16 October 1986 (aged 86) Saint-Hyacinthe, Quebec
- Party: Liberal
- Spouse(s): Florentine Girard (m. 9 January 1922)
- Profession: master butcher, farmer, merchant

Joseph Louis-Rosario Fontaine (26 August 1900 – 16 October 1986) was a Liberal Party member of the House of Commons of Canada. He was born at Saint-Damase, Quebec. He was a master butcher, meat cutter, farmer and merchant by career.

Fontaine was mayor of Notre-Dame-de-Saint-Hyacinthe parish between 1938 and 1952. He was first elected to Parliament at the St. Hyacinthe—Bagot riding in the 1945 general election. With a minor spelling change to the riding in 1947, he was re-elected at Saint-Hyacinthe—Bagot in 1949 and 1953. He was defeated by Théogène Ricard of the Progressive Conservative Party in the 1957 election.
