= Chantal Soucy =

Canadian politician

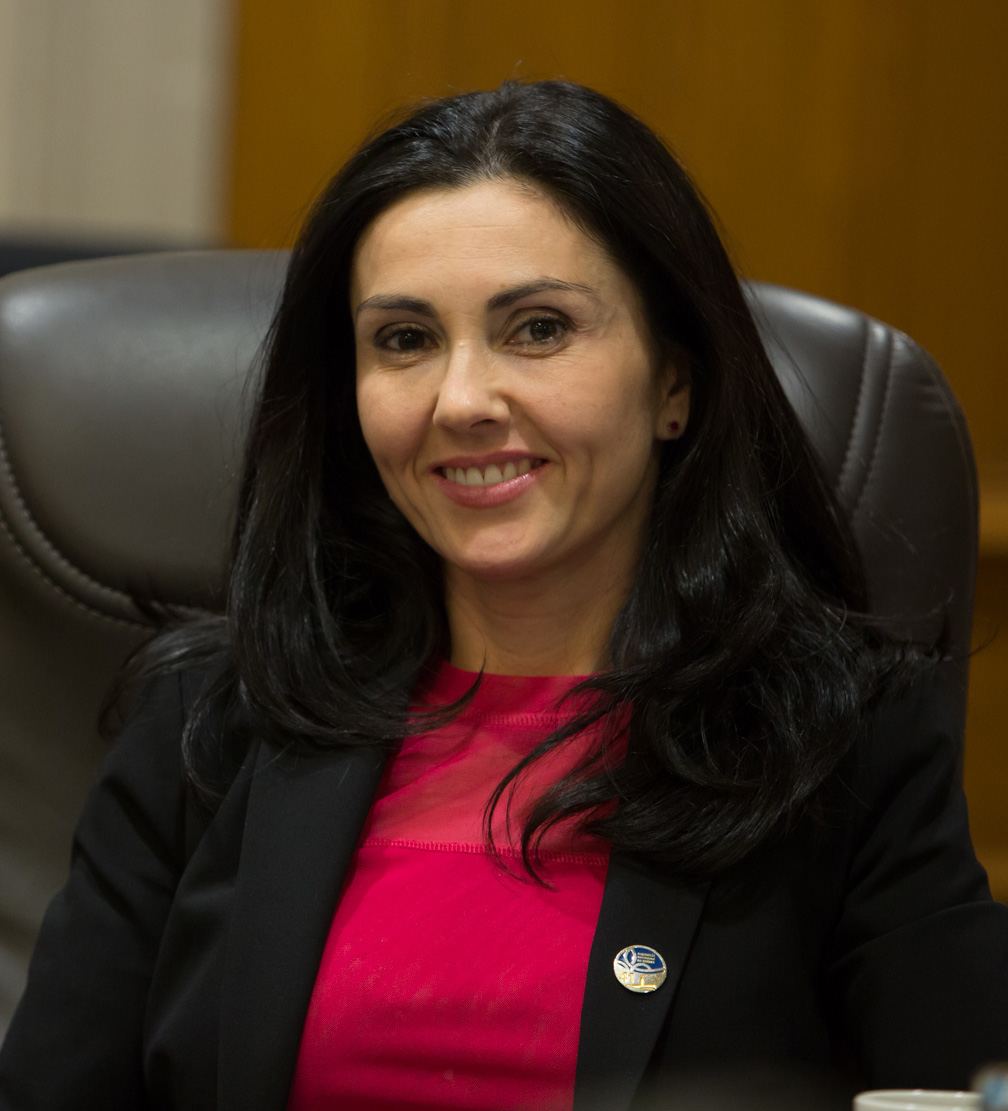
- Soucy in 2015

Member of the National Assembly for Saint-Hyacinthe
- In office April 7, 2014 – October 5, 2026
- Preceded by: Émilien Pelletier
- Succeeded by: Simon-Pierre Savard-Tremblay

Personal details
- Born: 1974 Saint-Rémi-de-Napierville, Quebec, Canada
- Party: Coalition Avenir Québec
- Other political affiliations: Liberal (federal)

Chantal Soucy is a Canadian politician who served as a member of the National Assembly of Quebec representing the electoral district of Saint-Hyacinthe from 2014 to 2026. She is a member of the Coalition Avenir Québec.

She was also the party's candidate in Verchères in the 2012 election.

After deciding not to stand for re-election in the 2026 Quebec general election, she was nominated to run in the pending Saint-Hyacinthe—Bagot—Acton federal by-election as the Liberal candidate.

== Electoral history ==
=== Federal elections ===
Canadian federal by-election, December 7, 2026: Saint-Hyacinthe—Bagot—Acton Resignation of Simon-Pierre Savard-Tremblay
The by-election will be held on December 7, 2026.
Party	Candidate	Votes	%	±%
Bloc Québécois	Caroline Émond			
Liberal	Chantal Soucy			
Conservative	Luc Brodeur-Jourdain			
New Democratic	Mathieu Boisvert			
Green	Martin Grenier			
People's	TBD			
Total valid votes				
Total rejected ballots				
Turnout				
Eligible voters		84,439		
Note:The Bloc Québécois won the seat in the 2025 general election, but Savard-Tremblay resigned from the caucus and sat as an independent MP on May 28, 2026.
Source: Elections Canada

=== Provincial elections ===
2022 Quebec general election: Saint-Hyacinthe
Party	Candidate	Votes	%	±%
Coalition Avenir Québec	Chantal Soucy	22,487	54.42	+2.42
Parti Québécois	Alexis Gagné-Lebrun	6,900	16.70	+0.72
Québec solidaire	Philippe Daigneault	5,636	13.64	–2.78
Conservative	Kim Beaudoin	4,066	9.84	–
Liberal	Agnieszka Wnorowska	1,705	4.13	–9.98
Green	Mustapha Jaalouk	217	0.53	–
Climat Québec	Julie Raiche	168	0.41	–
Independent	Gary Daigneault	142	0.34	–
Total valid votes		41,321	98.34	+0.49
Total rejected ballots		697	1.66	–0.49
Turnout		42,018	70.47	–0.99
Electors on the lists		59,625	–	–

2018 Quebec general election: Saint-Hyacinthe
Party	Candidate	Votes	%	±%
Coalition Avenir Québec	Chantal Soucy	21,227	52.00	+19.26
Québec solidaire	Marijo Demers	6,826	16.72	+9.78
Parti Québécois	Daniel Breton	6,524	15.98	-13.74
Liberal	Annie Pelletier	5,758	14.11	-18.81
New Democratic	Luc Chulak	486	1.19	
Total valid votes		40,821	97.85	
Total rejected ballots		898	2.15	
Turnout		41,719	71.46	
Eligible voters		58,377		
Coalition Avenir Québec hold		Swing		+4.74
Source(s) "Rapport des résultats officiels du scrutin". Élections Québec.

2014 Quebec general election
Party	Candidate	Votes	%	±%
Coalition Avenir Québec	Chantal Soucy	13,245	32.74	+1.63
Parti Québécois	Émilien Pelletier	12,023	29.72	-6.82
Liberal	Louise Arpin	11,701	28.92	+4.95
Québec solidaire	Danielle Pelland	2,806	6.94	+1.94
Option nationale	Éric Pothier	374	0.92	-0.90
Conservative	Simon Labbé	304	0.75	+0.06
Total valid votes		40,453	97.77	
Total rejected ballots		923	2.23	
Turnout		41,376	71.58	
Electors on the lists		57,803		
Coalition Avenir Québec gain from Parti Québécois		Swing		+4.23

2012 Quebec general election
Party	Candidate	Votes	%	±%
Parti Québécois	Stéphane Bergeron	22,052	47.27	-8.15
Coalition Avenir Québec	Chantal Soucy	14,682	31.47	+15.98
Liberal	Maxime St-Onge	6,419	13.76	-9.11
Québec solidaire	Marie-Thérèse Toutant	1,900	4.07	+1.42
Option nationale	Diane Massicotte	1,035	2.22	–
Independent	Steven Terranova	297	0.64	–
CC	Mario Geoffrion	269	0.58	–
Total valid votes		46,654	98.71	
Total rejected ballots		608	1.29	
Turnout		47,262	84.14	
Electors on the lists		56,169		
Parti Québécois hold		Swing		-12.06

* Coalition Avenir Québec change is from the Action démocratique.

2012 results reference:
