= Jean-Guy Dagenais =

Canadian politician (born 1950)

The Honourable Jean-Guy Dagenais

Canadian Senator for Quebec
- In office January 17, 2012 – February 2, 2025
- Nominated by: Stephen Harper
- Appointed by: David Johnston
- Preceded by: Francis Fox

Personal details
- Born: February 2, 1950 (age 76)
- Party: Canadian Senators Group (2019-present)
- Other political affiliations: Conservative

Jean-Guy Dagenais (born February 2, 1950) is a Canadian politician from Quebec. He was appointed to the Senate of Canada on January 17, 2012, by Stephen Harper after losing in the 2011 Canadian federal election running as a Conservative candidate in Saint-Hyacinthe—Bagot. In 2019, he left the Conservative Senate caucus to sit with the Canadian Senators Group, and left the Conservative party in 2022 shortly after Pierre Poilievre was elected as leader. He retired on February 2, 2025 upon reaching the mandatory retirement age of 75.

== Political career ==
Dagenais ran for a seat to the House of Commons of Canada under the Conservative banner in the 2011 Canadian federal election in Saint-Hyacinthe—Bagot. He was defeated finishing third place out of five candidates behind winner Marie-Claude Morin and defeated incumbent Ève-Mary Thaï Thi Lac.

Prime Minister Stephen Harper advised Governor General David Johnston to appoint Dagenais to the Senate of Canada on January 6, 2012, and he was subsequently appointed on January 17, representing the Senate division of Victoria (Quebec).

In response to ongoing criticism of the Senate stemming from the Mike Duffy scandal, Dagenais railed against NDP MP Charmaine Borg, in a letter to the House of Commons accusing her of being a whiny, useless puppet who would not have won election if not for sympathy for Jack Layton, and of ignorance of the constitution for her support of the NDP position on abolishing the Senate. Dagenais was unapologetic for his insults and for his incorrect claim that Borg was wrong to note that the NDP supports abolition, both despite the fact that he himself was appointed to Senate after losing an election, and was the one who was wrong about NDP policy. In response, Borg launched an official complaint against the Senator.

On November 18, 2019, Dagenais announced that he was quitting the Conservative's Senate caucus to join the Canadian Senators Group due to disagreements with the leadership of Andrew Scheer, concerns over the former's social views and the "low importance" attached to Quebec voters by party leadership as the reasons for his defection. However, he is keeping his individual membership to the Conservative Party itself.

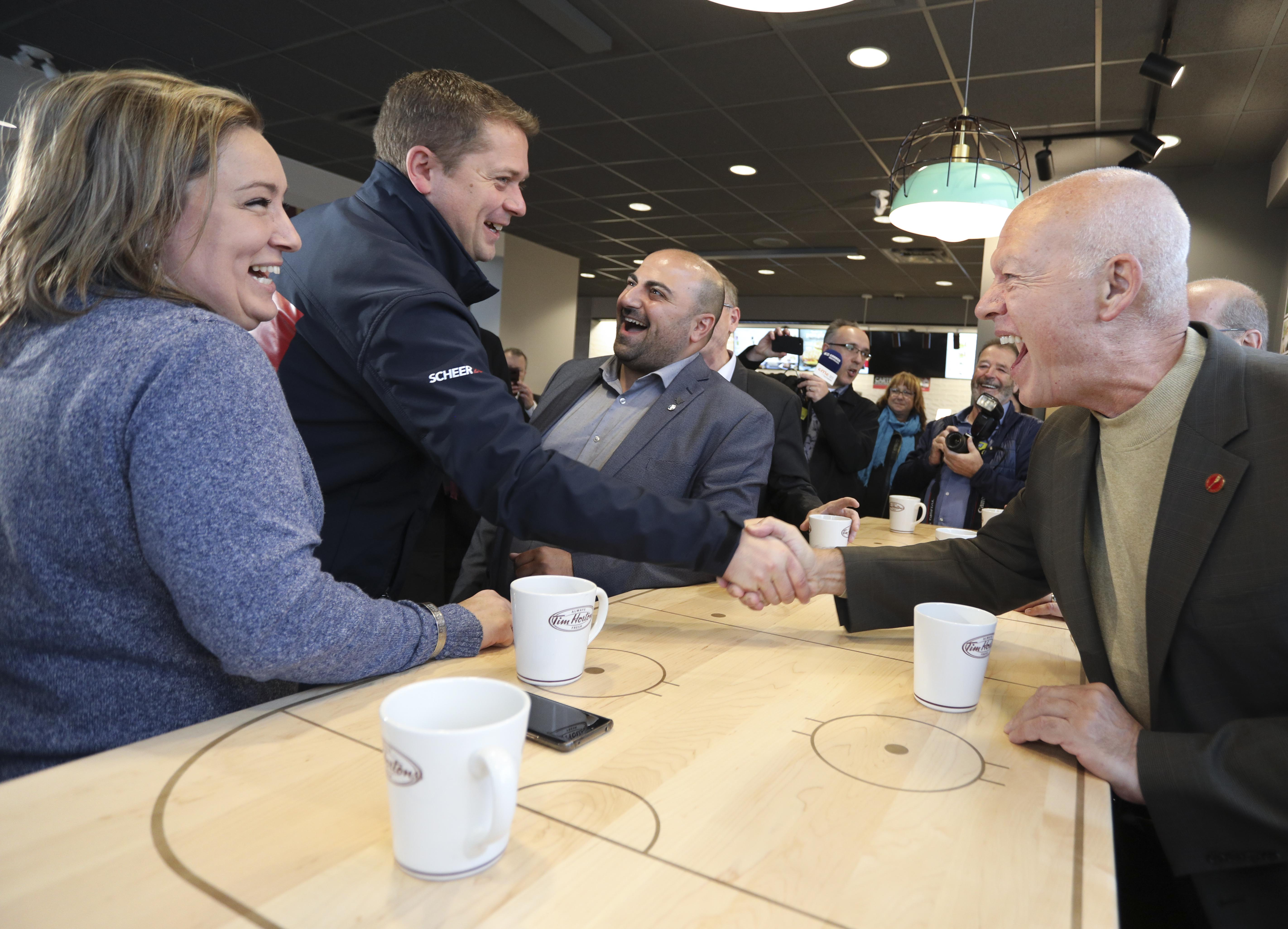
Jean-Guy Dagenais and Andrew Scheer in 2019.

In January 2021, Dagenais was in Florida overseeing "urgent work" on a property he owned, despite public health advice to avoid non-essential international travel during the COVID-19 pandemic in Canada.

In Senate, during debate on use of the Emergencies Act in response to the convoy protests, Dagenais suggested use of the Act was unjustified, claiming police didn't need its additional powers. The blockade lasted from January 29 to February 20.

Dagenais endorsed former Quebec premier Jean Charest in the 2022 Conservative Party of Canada leadership election. In September 2022, Dagenais left the Conservative party shortly after Pierre Poilievre was elected as leader, winning by huge margins, including in Quebec. Dagenais cited Poilievre's plan to fire Tiff Macklem, the Governor of the Bank of Canada as well as his support for the Canada convoy protest.

He retired on February 2, 2025 upon reaching the mandatory retirement age of 75.

== Electoral record ==
2011 Canadian federal election
Party	Candidate	Votes	%	±%	Expenditures
New Democratic	Marie-Claude Morin	26,963	52.4	+38.4	
Bloc Québécois	Ève-Mary Thaï Thi Lac	12,651	24.6	-22.7	
Conservative	Jean-Guy Dagenais	8,108	15.7	-5.5	
Liberal	Denis Vallée	2,784	5.4	-8.4	
Green	Johany Beaudoin-Bussières	994	1.9	-1.8	
Total valid votes/Expense limit		51,500	100.0		
Total rejected ballots		863	1.6	–	
Turnout		52,363	66.2	–	
Eligible voters		79,085	–	–	
New Democratic gain from Bloc Québécois		Swing		+30.55	
