= Marie-Claude Morin =

Canadian politician

Member of Parliament for Saint-Hyacinthe—Bagot
- In office May 2, 2011 – October 19, 2015
- Preceded by: Ève-Mary Thaï Thi Lac
- Succeeded by: Brigitte Sansoucy

Chair of the Standing Committee on Status of Women
- In office April 23, 2012 – April 29, 2013
- Minister: Rona Ambrose
- Preceded by: Irene Mathyssen
- Succeeded by: Lysane Blanchette-Lamothe

Personal details
- Born: January 25, 1985 (age 41) Trois-Rivières, Quebec
- Party: New Democratic Party
- Profession: Actress, coordinator, social worker, student

Marie-Claude Morin (born January 25, 1985, in Trois-Rivières, Quebec) is a Canadian politician, who was elected to the House of Commons of Canada in the 2011 election. She represented the electoral district of Saint-Hyacinthe—Bagot as a member of the New Democratic Party for one term.

== Early life ==
Morin pursued her post-secondary education at the Université du Québec à Montréal where she was a social work student.

== Political career ==
Morin ran for a seat to the House of Commons of Canada in the electoral district of Saint-Hyacinthe—Bagot under the New Democratic Party of Canada banner in the 2011 Canadian federal election. She defeated incumbent Ève-Mary Thaï Thi Lac and future Canadian Senator Jean-Guy Dagenais as well as two other candidates to win her first term in office. In 2014 she announced she would not seek re-election for health and personal reasons.
