= Quebec Route 231 =

Highway in Quebec, Canada

Route 231

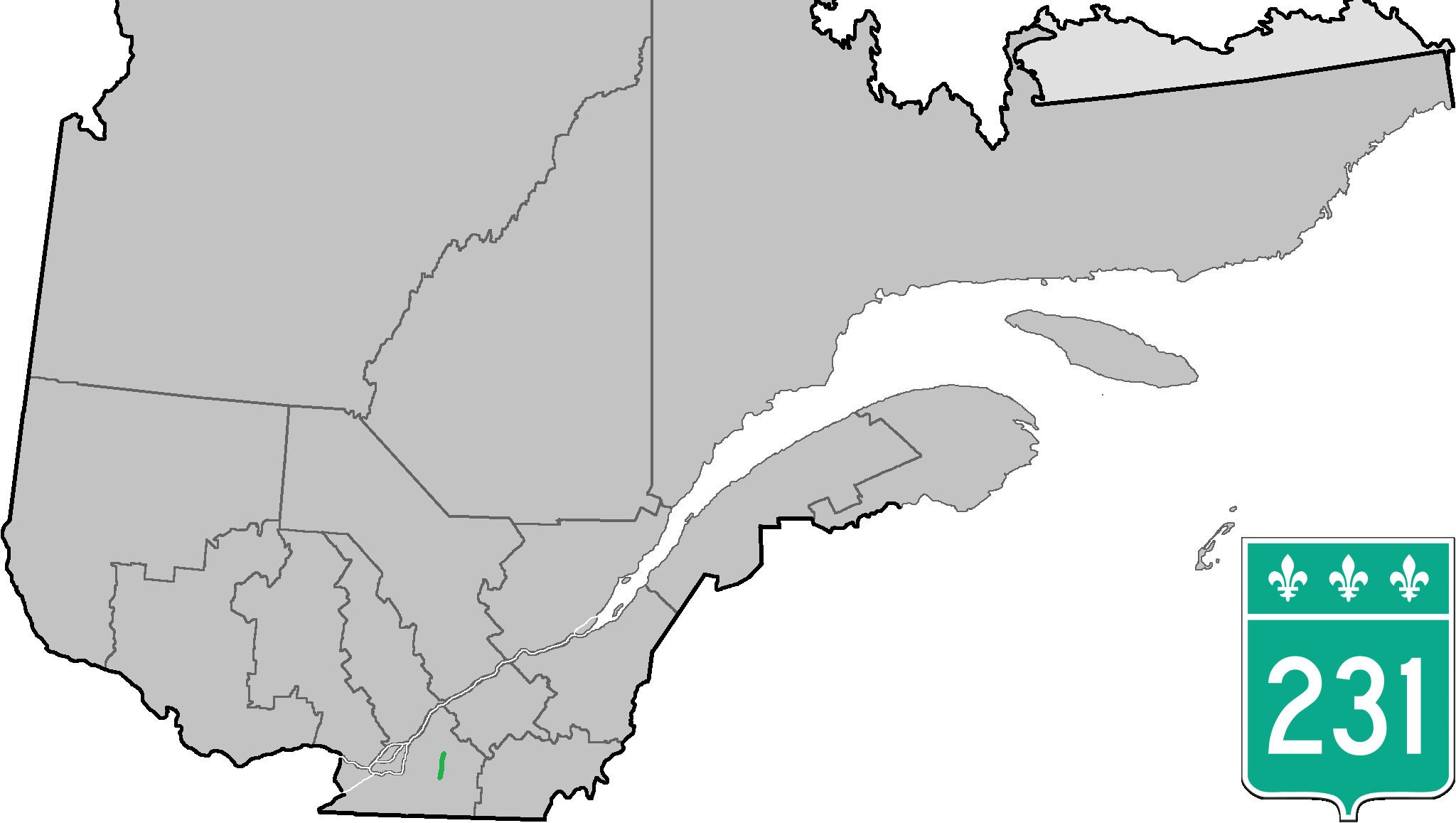

Route information
- Maintained by Transports Québec
- Length: 22.6 km (14.0 mi)

Major junctions
- South end: R-112 in Rougemont
- R-233 in Saint-Damase
- North end: R-116 in Saint-Hyacinthe

Location
- Country: Canada
- Province: Quebec
- Major cities: Saint-Hyacinthe, Rougemont

Highway system
- Quebec provincial highways; Autoroutes; List; Former
← R-230	→ R-232

Route 231 is a provincial highway located in the Montérégie region of Quebec. It runs from the junction of Route 112 between Rougemont and Saint-Césaire northeastward towards Saint-Hyacinthe until the junction of Route 116.

== Municipalities along Route 231 ==
- Rougemont
- Saint-Damase
- Saint-Hyacinthe

== See also ==
- List of Quebec provincial highways
