= Léandre Dion =

Canadian politician (1937–2022)

MNA for Saint-Hyacinthe
- In office 12 September 1994 – 26 March 2007
- Preceded by: Charles Messier
- Succeeded by: Claude L'Écuyer

Personal details
- Born: 13 July 1937
- Died: 29 October 2022 (aged 85)
- Party: Parti Québécois

Léandre Dion (13 July 1937 – 29 October 2022) was a Canadian beekeeper and politician from Quebec. From 1994 to 2007 he was Member of Parliament in the National Assembly of Quebec, representing the provincial electoral district of Saint-Hyacinthe as a member of the Parti Québécois.

== Life and career ==
Dion earned his bachelor of arts degree from Université Laval in 1959 and a degree in theology from Medellin Theological Seminary in Colombia in 1965. Later, he earned a Certificate in Laws from Université de Montréal in 1989.

Dion ran a farm cooperative in Peru, then directed the regional office of the Canadian University Service Overseas in the early 1970s. He was the founding president of the Quebec Federation of Beekeepers, which he ran from 1978 to 1983. In 1981 he was the founding president of the Citizens' Committee of Saint-Liboire in Saint-Liboire, Quebec. He held various positions within the Parti Québécois from 1983 to 1992.

He entered politics in 1982 when he was elected to the municipal council of Saint-Liboire. From 1985 to 1991 he was a commissioner on the Commission for the Protection of Agricultural Land in Quebec. Dion was elected to the National Assembly for the first time in the 1994 Quebec general election. He was re-elected in the 1998 Quebec general election and in the 2003 Quebec general election. Dion was defeated by Claude L'Écuyer in the 2007 Quebec general election.

Following his retirement, he published a novel in 2009 titled La tourmente.
