= Quebec Route 233 =

Highway in Quebec, Canada

Route 233

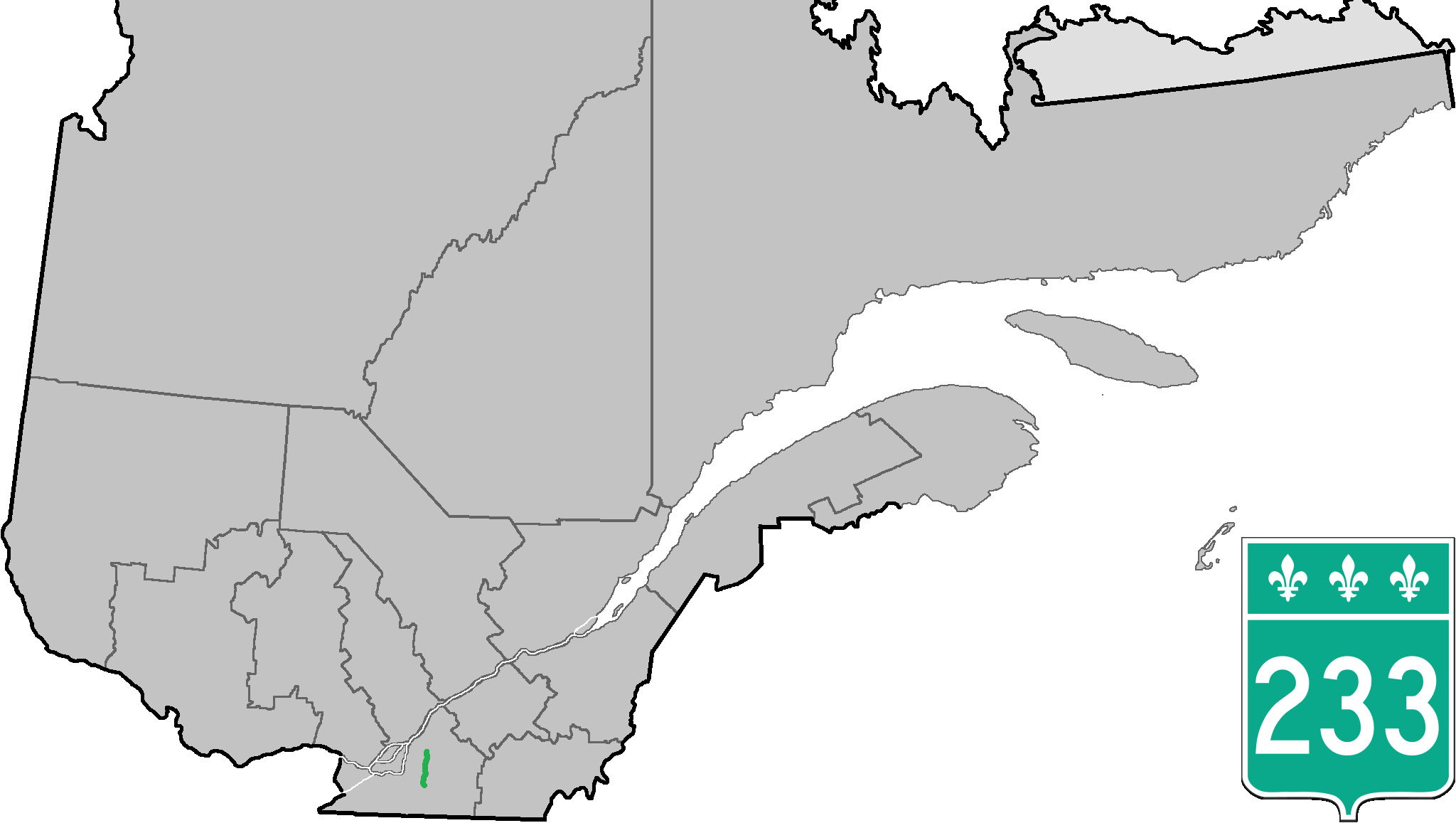

Route information
- Maintained by Transports Québec
- Length: 34.2 km (21.3 mi)

Major junctions
- South end: R-104 in Farnham
- R-112 in Saint-Césaire; A-10 in Sainte-Brigide d'Iberville
- North end: R-231 in Saint-Hyacinthe

Location
- Country: Canada
- Province: Quebec
- Major cities: Saint-Hyacinthe, Farnham

Highway system
- Quebec provincial highways; Autoroutes; List; Former
← R-232	→ R-234

Route 233 is a provincial highway located in the Estrie and Montérégie regions of Quebec east of Montreal. The highway links Farnham and Saint-Césaire with Saint-Hyacinthe. It starts at a junction with Route 104 between Farnham and Sainte-Brigide-d'Iberville, next to a training facility of the Canadian Forces and runs north toward a parclo interchange with Autoroute 10 after which it crosses the Rivière du Sud-Ouest which it follows for a few kilometers until its headwaters on Yamaska River. Shortly after it runs through Saint-Césaire, crossing Route 112, before continuing to follow the Yamaska until its end at the junction of Route 231.

== Municipalities along Route 233 ==
- Farnham
- Sainte-Brigide-d'Iberville
- Saint-Césaire
- Saint-Damase
- Saint-Hyacinthe

== See also ==
- List of Quebec provincial highways
