= Théogène Ricard =

Canadian politician

Official 1968 portrait

J. H. Théogène Ricard, PC (April 30, 1909 – April 7, 2006) was a Canadian politician.

An insurance agent by training, Ricard was first elected to the House of Commons of Canada in the 1957 election as the Progressive Conservative Member of Parliament (MP) for Saint-Hyacinthe—Bagot. In 1962, he was appointed Chief Government Whip and parliamentary secretary to the Prime Minister of Canada. Prior to the 1963 general election, he was promoted to the Cabinet of John Diefenbaker as minister without portfolio. Although he kept his seat in the election, the Diefenbaker government was defeated, and Ricard's Cabinet career came to an end after barely a month.

Ricard remained in Parliament as an opposition MP through the 1965 and 1968 general elections, and retired from politics in 1972.

Parliament of Canada
Preceded by Joseph Fontaine	Member of Parliament for Saint-Hyacinthe—Bagot; 1957–1968	Succeeded by The electoral district was abolished in 1966.
Preceded by The electoral district was created in 1966.	Member of Parliament for Saint-Hyacinthe; 1968–1972	Succeeded by Claude Wagner
