= Claude L'Écuyer =

Canadian politician (born 1947)

MNA for Saint-Hyacinthe
- In office April 25, 2007 – November 5, 2008
- Preceded by: Léandre Dion
- Succeeded by: Émilien Pelletier

Personal details
- Born: January 26, 1947 (age 79) Saint-Hyacinthe, Quebec
- Party: Action démocratique du Québec
- Spouse: Michelle St-Roch

Claude L'Écuyer (born January 26, 1947, in Saint-Hyacinthe, Quebec) is a politician from Quebec, Canada. He was an Action démocratique du Québec Member of the National Assembly for the electoral district of Saint-Hyacinthe from 2007 to 2008.

L'Ecuyer holds a degree in law from the Université de Montréal and is a member of the Barreau du Québec and the Canadian Bar since 1973. He practiced law for nearly 35 years before jumping to provincial politics. He also a secretary of the Administration Committee of the Honore-Mercier Hospital in Saint-Hyacinthe and a member of the economic and industrial development in that region.

He was first elected in the 2007 election with 36% of the vote. Parti Québécois incumbent Léandre Dion, who was running for a fourth consecutive term, finished second with 32% of the vote. L'Écuyer took office on April 12, 2007.
