= Télesphore-Damien Bouchard =

Canadian politician (1881–1962)

The Hon. Télesphore-Damien Bouchard
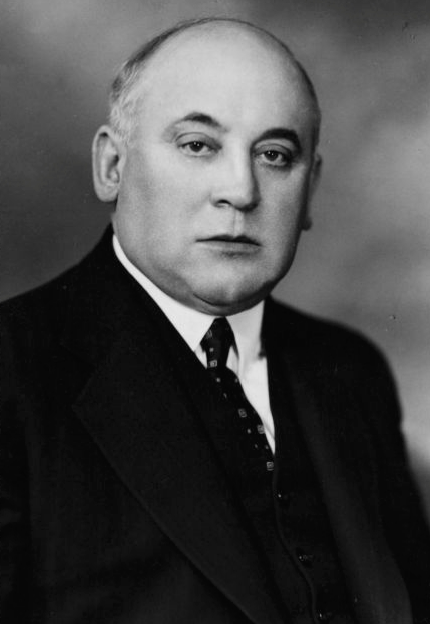

Member of the Legislative Assembly of Quebec for Saint-Hyacinthe
- In office 1912–1919
- Preceded by: Henri Bourassa
- Succeeded by: Armand Boisseau
- In office 1923–1944
- Preceded by: Armand Boisseau
- Succeeded by: Ernest-Joseph Chartier

Speaker of the Legislative Assembly
- In office 1930–1935
- Preceded by: Hector Laferté
- Succeeded by: Lucien Dugas

Leader of the Opposition of Quebec
- In office 1936–1939
- Preceded by: Maurice Duplessis
- Succeeded by: Maurice Duplessis

Senator for The Laurentides, Quebec
- In office 1944–1962
- Appointed by: William Lyon Mackenzie King
- Preceded by: Pierre Édouard Blondin
- Succeeded by: Maurice Bourget

Personal details
- Born: December 20, 1881 Saint-Hyacinthe, Quebec
- Died: November 13, 1962 (aged 80) Westmount, Quebec
- Party: Liberal
- Other political affiliations: Quebec Liberal Party
- Cabinet: Minister of Municipal Affairs, Trade and Commerce (1935–1936); Minister of Municipal Affairs (1936); Minister of Lands and Forests (1936); Minister of Public Works (1939–1942); Minister of Roads (1939–1944)

Télesphore-Damien Bouchard (French pronunciation: [telɛsfɔʁ damjɛ̃ buʃaʁ]; December 20, 1881 – November 13, 1962) was a politician in Quebec, Canada.

Born in Saint-Hyacinthe, Quebec, he was the mayor of the municipality from 1917 to 1930 and from 1932 to 1944 and president of the Federation of Canadian Municipalities in 1918. He also founded the Union des municipalités de la province de Québec (Federation of municipalities in the province of Quebec) in 1919. He served as Liberal leader of the Opposition in the Legislative Assembly of Quebec from 1936 to 1939, after Liberal leader Adélard Godbout lost the 1936 election and also narrowly lost his own seat. Bouchard served as opposition leader while Godbout remained leader of the Liberal Party.

After the Liberals returned to power in the 1939 election, he served in Godbout's cabinet. Resigned in 1944 when he was appointed to the Senate, where he remained until his death. Overall, he was the MLA for the district of Saint-Hyacinthe from 1912 to 1919 and from 1923 to 1944.

A leading campaigner for public ownership of electric utilities, he became first president of Hydro-Québec in April 1944. Two months later he was fired by Premier Godbout, after Bouchard made a series of anticlerical statements.

== Biography ==
- GUTTMAN, Frank Myron, The Devil from Saint-Hyacinthe: Senator Télesphore-Damien Bouchard, A Tragic Hero, iUniverse Books, New York, 2007, 405 p.

== See also ==
- Politics of Quebec
- Quebec general elections
- List of Quebec leaders of the Opposition
- Timeline of Quebec history
