= Andrée Champagne =

Canadian politician (1939–2020)

The Honourable Andrée Champagne PC CM

Deputy Speaker of the House of Commons of Canada Chair of Committees of the Whole
- In office May 15, 1990 – September 8, 1993
- Speaker: John Allen Fraser
- Preceded by: Marcel Danis (1988)
- Succeeded by: David Kilgour (1994)

Assistant Deputy Chair of the Committees of the Whole
- In office October 1, 1986 – May 14, 1990
- Speaker: John Allen Fraser
- Preceded by: Jean Charest
- Succeeded by: Denis Pronovost

Minister of State (Youth)
- In office September 17, 1984 – June 30, 1986
- Prime Minister: Brian Mulroney
- Minister: Walter McLean; Benoît Bouchard
- Preceded by: Position established
- Succeeded by: Jean Charest

Member of Parliament for Saint-Hyacinthe—Bagot
- In office September 4, 1984 – October 25, 1993
- Preceded by: Marcel Ostiguy
- Succeeded by: Yvan Loubier

Canadian Senator from Grandville
- In office August 2, 2005 – July 17, 2014
- Nominated by: Paul Martin
- Appointed by: Adrienne Clarkson
- Preceded by: John Lynch-Staunton
- Succeeded by: Chantal Petitclerc (2016)

Personal details
- Born: July 17, 1939 Saint-Hyacinthe, Quebec, Canada
- Died: June 6, 2020 (aged 80) Saint-Hyacinthe, Quebec, Canada
- Party: Conservative (2005–2020); Progressive Conservative (1984–1993)

Andrée Champagne PC CM (July 17, 1939 – June 6, 2020) was a Canadian actress, pianist and politician.

Born in Saint-Hyacinthe, Quebec, Champagne was an accomplished performer and personality in her home province. In the 1960s, she became well known on television playing "Donalda" in Claude-Henri Grignon's series Les Belles Histoires des pays d'en haut. After the series ended in 1970, she opened her own casting agency.

She remained active as a performer, but also became involved in cultural issues, serving on the board of directors of l'Institut québécois du cinéma and on the executive of l'Union des artistes in the early 1980s. She also helped create Le Chez Nous des Artistes, a retirement home for artists.

Champagne entered politics as a Progressive Conservative candidate in the 1984 election, and was elected in the Tory landslide as Member of Parliament for Saint-Hyacinthe-Bagot. She was appointed to the Cabinet of Prime Minister Brian Mulroney as Minister of State for Youth.

From 1986 to 1990, she served as Assistant Deputy Chair of the Committee of the Whole House, and became Deputy Speaker of the House of Commons in 1990. She served in that role until her electoral defeat in the 1993 general election. On August 2, 2005, Prime Minister Paul Martin announced her appointment as a Conservative member of the Senate of Canada. She retired upon reaching the age of 75 on July 17, 2014.

Champagne died on June 6, 2020, in Saint-Hyacinthe.
