= Joseph Morin (Saint-Hyacinthe MLA) =

Canadian politician

Joseph Morin (February 24, 1854 – March 2, 1930) was a notary and political figure in Quebec. He represented Saint-Hyacinthe in the Legislative Assembly of Quebec from 1900 to 1908 as a Liberal.

He was born in Saint-Hyacinthe, Canada East, the son of Pierre Morin and Tharsille Vasseur, and was educated at the Séminaire de Saint-Hyacinthe. He qualified as a notary in 1878 and practised at Saint-Hyacinthe from 1878 to 1908, in partnership with Michel-Esdras Bernier. In 1882, he married Marie-Louise-Laetitia Bourgoin. Morin was secretary-treasurer for the Saint-Hyacinthe agricultural society and was president of the Quebec agricultural council from 1906 to 1908. He was defeated when he ran for reelection to the Quebec assembly in 1908. Morin served as auditor for the province of Quebec from 1909 to 1929. He died in Saint-Hyacinthe at the age of 76.

His son Louis-Simon-René served in the Canadian House of Commons.
