= Saint-Hyacinthe—Bagot—Acton =

Federal electoral district in Quebec, Canada

Coordinates: 45.63589°N 72.89841°W

Quebec electoral district
- Interactive map of riding boundaries (previously named Saint-Hyacinthe—Bagot) from the 1997 federal election

Federal electoral district
- Legislature: House of Commons
MP
Vacant
- District created: 1933
- First contested: 1935
- Last contested: 2025
- District webpage: profile, map

Demographics
- Population (2011): 99,629
- Electors (2015): 80,577
- Area (km²): 1,948
- Pop. density (per km²): 51.1
- Census division(s): Acton, Les Maskoutains
- Census subdivision(s): Saint-Hyacinthe, Acton-Vale, Saint-Pie, Saint-Liboire, Sainte-Marie-Madeleine, Saint-Dominique, La Présentation, Saint-Damase, Sainte-Madeleine, Upton

Saint-Hyacinthe—Bagot—Acton (formerly Saint-Hyacinthe—Bagot) is a federal electoral district that has been represented in the House of Commons of Canada since 1935. It is located in Quebec, Canada. Its population in 2006 was 95,983. In the 2015 election, the winner received the lowest vote percentage of any winning candidate in the country.

== Demographics ==
According to the 2021 Canadian census, 2023 representation order

Racial groups: 92.6% White, 2.6% Black, 1.9% Latin American, 1.5% Indigenous
Languages: 94.8% French, 2.0% Spanish, 1.6% English
Religions: 72.3% Christian (64.6% Catholic, 7.7% Other), 1.4% Muslim, 25.8% None
Median income: $39,600 (2020)
Average income: $45,760 (2020)

== Geography ==
There are 25 municipalities within the electoral riding of Saint-Hyacinthe—Bagot—Acton.

The district includes the Regional County Municipalities of Acton and Les Maskoutains. It includes the communities of Saint-Hyacinthe, Acton Vale, Saint-Pie, Sainte-Madeleine, and Saint-Dominique.

== History ==
The electoral district was created in 1933 from Bagot and St. Hyacinthe—Rouville ridings as "St. Hyacinthe—Bagot". In 1947, the name was changed to "Saint-Hyacinthe—Bagot".

In 1966, the riding was abolished. Parts of the riding were combined with parts of Chambly—Rouville and Richelieu—Verchères riding into a new riding named "Saint-Hyacinthe". Saint-Hyacinthe was renamed "Saint-Hyacinthe—Bagot" after the 1980 election.

Almost all of the riding voted for the Bloc in 2006 except for parts of Roxton Falls and its surrounding township, Roxton which voted Conservative.

After the resignation of Yvan Loubier on 21 February 2007, a by-election occurred on 17 September 2007.

This riding was not changed as a result of the 2012 electoral redistribution.

Following the 2022 federal electoral redistribution the riding was renamed Saint-Hyacinthe—Bagot—Acton.

In May 2026, Simon-Pierre Savard-Tremblay, who was elected under the Bloc Quebecois in the 2019 federal election, announced that he would be resigning at the end of the parliamentary session in order to run as a Parti Quebecois candidate in the 2026 Quebec provincial election. After his announcement, he sat as an independent Member until the summer. He vacated the seat on 19 June 2026, triggering a by-election.

A by-election was called on 1 November 2026. Liberal candidate Chantal Soucy previously represented the provincial riding of Saint-Hyacinthe from 2014 to 2026, before choosing not to seek re-election in the 2026 Quebec provincial election.

== Members of Parliament ==
This riding has elected the following members of Parliament:

Parliament	Years	Member	Party
St. Hyacinthe—Bagot; Riding created from Bagot and St. Hyacinthe—Rouville
18th	1935–1940	Adélard Fontaine	Liberal
19th	1940–1944	Adélard Fontaine	Liberal
19th	1944–1945	Joseph Fontaine	Liberal
20th	1945–1949	Joseph Fontaine	Liberal
Saint-Hyacinthe—Bagot
21st	1949–1953	Joseph Fontaine	Liberal
22nd	1953–1957	Joseph Fontaine	Liberal
23rd	1957–1958	Théogène Ricard	Progressive Conservative
24th	1958–1962	Théogène Ricard	Progressive Conservative
25th	1962–1963	Théogène Ricard	Progressive Conservative
26th	1963–1965	Théogène Ricard	Progressive Conservative
27th	1965–1968	Théogène Ricard	Progressive Conservative
Saint-Hyacinthe
28th	1968–1972	Théogène Ricard	Progressive Conservative
29th	1972–1974	Claude Wagner	Progressive Conservative
30th	1974–1978	Claude Wagner	Progressive Conservative
30th	1978–1979	Marcel Ostiguy	Liberal
31st	1979–1980	Marcel Ostiguy	Liberal
Saint-Hyacinthe—Bagot
32nd	1980–1984	Marcel Ostiguy	Liberal
33rd	1984–1988	Andrée Champagne	Progressive Conservative
34th	1988–1993	Andrée Champagne	Progressive Conservative
35th	1993–1997	Yvan Loubier	Bloc Québécois
36th	1997–2000	Yvan Loubier	Bloc Québécois
37th	2000–2004	Yvan Loubier	Bloc Québécois
38th	2004–2006	Yvan Loubier	Bloc Québécois
39th	2006–2007	Yvan Loubier	Bloc Québécois
39th	2007–2008	Ève-Mary Thaï Thi Lac	Bloc Québécois
40th	2008–2011	Ève-Mary Thaï Thi Lac	Bloc Québécois
41st	2011–2015	Marie-Claude Morin	New Democratic
42nd	2015–2019	Brigitte Sansoucy	New Democratic
43rd	2019–2021	Simon-Pierre Savard-Tremblay	Bloc Québécois
44th	2021–2025	Simon-Pierre Savard-Tremblay	Bloc Québécois
Saint-Hyacinthe—Bagot—Acton
45th	2025–2026	Simon-Pierre Savard-Tremblay	Bloc Québécois
45th	2026–2026	Simon-Pierre Savard-Tremblay	Independent

== Election results ==
=== Saint-Hyacinthe—Bagot—Acton, 2025-present ===
Canadian federal by-election, December 7, 2026 Resignation of Simon-Pierre Savard-Tremblay
The by-election will be held on December 7, 2026.
Party	Candidate	Votes	%	±%
Bloc Québécois	Caroline Émond			
Liberal	Chantal Soucy			
Conservative	Luc Brodeur-Jourdain			
New Democratic	Mathieu Boisvert			
Green	Martin Grenier			
People's	TBD			
Total valid votes				
Total rejected ballots				
Turnout				
Eligible voters		84,439		
Note:The Bloc Québécois won the seat in the 2025 general election, but Savard-Tremblay resigned from the caucus and sat as an independent MP on May 28, 2026.
Source: Elections Canada

2025 Canadian federal election
Party	Candidate	Votes	%	±%	Expenditures
Bloc Québécois	Simon-Pierre Savard-Tremblay	25,447	43.88	–3.57	$60,384.29
Liberal	Mélanie Bédard	19,504	33.64	+10.95	$15,238.91
Conservative	Gaëtan Deschênes	10,431	17.99	+4.48	$17,122.71
New Democratic	Raymonde Plamondon	1,373	2.37	–9.27	$385.85
Green	Martin Grenier	800	1.38	N/A	$0.00
People's	Sylvain Pariseau	431	0.74	–1.98	$0.00
Total valid votes/expense limit		57,986	98.18	+0.83	$130,809.39
Total rejected ballots		1,072	1.82	–0.83	
Turnout		59,058	69.94	+4.52	
Eligible voters		84,439			
Bloc Québécois hold		Swing		–7.26	
Source: Elections Canada

=== Saint-Hyacinthe—Bagot, 1981–2025 ===
2021 Canadian federal election
Party	Candidate	Votes	%	±%	Expenditures
Bloc Québécois	Simon-Pierre Savard-Tremblay	25,165	47.5	+6.1	$42,791.75
Liberal	Caroline-Joan Boucher	12,030	22.7	+1.4	$13,920.17
Conservative	André Lepage	7,166	13.5	-0.9	$48,511.65
New Democratic	Brigitte Sansoucy	6,170	11.6	-6.8	$17,351.86
People's	Sylvain Pariseau	1,445	2.7	+1.8	$0.00
Free	Sébastien Desautels	1,055	2.0	N/A	$1,439.69
Total valid votes/Expense limit		53,031	97.4	–	$112,852.48
Total rejected ballots		1,439	2.6		
Turnout		54,470	65.6		
Eligible voters		83,086			
Bloc Québécois hold		Swing		+2.4	
Source: Elections Canada

2019 Canadian federal election: Saint-Hyacinthe—Bagot
Party	Candidate	Votes	%	±%	Expenditures
Bloc Québécois	Simon-Pierre Savard-Tremblay	23,143	41.4	+17.1	$26,447.17
Liberal	René Vincelette	11,903	21.3	-6.3	$49,472.90
New Democratic	Brigitte Sansoucy	10,297	18.4	-10.3	$48,330.94
Conservative	Bernard Barré	8,062	14.4	-2.3	$44,085.44
Green	Sabrina Huet-Côté	2,031	3.6	+1.3	none listed
People's	Jean-François Bélanger	478	0.9	–	none listed
Total valid votes/expense limit		55,914	97.57		
Total rejected ballots		1,391	2.43	+0.25	
Turnout		57,305	70.1	+1.3	
Eligible voters		81,792			
Bloc Québécois gain from New Democratic		Swing		+11.7	
Source: Elections Canada

2015 Canadian federal election
Party	Candidate	Votes	%	±%	Expenditures
New Democratic	Brigitte Sansoucy	15,578	28.7	-23.7	$44,896.57
Liberal	René Vincelette	14,980	27.6	+22.2	$11,710.04
Bloc Québécois	Michel Filion	13,200	24.3	-0.3	$36,012.54
Conservative	Réjean Léveillé	9,098	16.7	+1.0	$75,448.51
Green	Lise Durand	1,243	2.3	+0.4	–
Independent	Ugo Ménard	270	0.5	–	$950.32
Total valid votes/Expense limit		54,369	100.0		$216,387.97
Total rejected ballots		1,214	2.18	+0.58	
Turnout		55,583	68.80	+2.20	
Eligible voters		80,787			
Source: Elections Canada
New Democratic hold		Swing		-22.95	

2011 Canadian federal election
Party	Candidate	Votes	%	±%	Expenditures
New Democratic	Marie-Claude Morin	26,963	52.4	+38.4	
Bloc Québécois	Ève-Mary Thaï Thi Lac	12,651	24.6	-22.7	
Conservative	Jean-Guy Dagenais	8,108	15.7	-5.5	
Liberal	Denis Vallée	2,784	5.4	-8.4	
Green	Johany Beaudoin-Bussières	994	1.9	-1.8	
Total valid votes/Expense limit		51,500	100.0		
Total rejected ballots		863	1.6	–	
Turnout		52,363	66.2	–	
Eligible voters		79,085	–	–	
New Democratic gain from Bloc Québécois		Swing		+30.55	

2008 Canadian federal election
Party	Candidate	Votes	%	±%	Expenditures
Bloc Québécois	Ève-Mary Thaï Thi Lac	22,719	47.3	+5.2	$42,031
Conservative	René Vincelette	10,203	21.2	-16.2	$72,405
New Democratic	Brigitte Sansoucy	6,721	14.0	+6.0	$2,914
Liberal	Denise Tremblay	6,638	13.8	+6.4	$577
Green	Jacques Tétreault	1,771	3.7	–	$2,351
Total valid votes/Expense limit		48,052	100.0	$83,812	
Bloc Québécois hold		Swing		+10.7	

Canadian federal by-election, September 17, 2007
Party	Candidate	Votes	%	±%	Expenditures
Bloc Québécois	Ève-Mary Thaï Thi Lac	13,443	42.1	-13.9	$67,621
Conservative	Bernard Barré	11,965	37.5	+12.7	$78,919
New Democratic	Brigitte Sansoucy	2,538	7.9	+2.5	$13,886
Liberal	Jean Caumartin	2,379	7.4	-2.4	$29,337
Green	Jacques Tétreault	1,169	3.7	-0.2	$2,022
Rhinoceros	Christian Willie Vanasse	384	1.2	–	$303
Canadian Action	Michel St-Onge	61	0.2	–	$706
Total valid votes/Expense limit		31,949	100.0	$81,624	
By-election due to the resignation of Yvan Loubier.

2006 Canadian federal election
Party	Candidate	Votes	%	±%	Expenditures
Bloc Québécois	Yvan Loubier	27,838	56.0	-6.4	$42,216
Conservative	Huguette Guilhaumon	12,323	24.8	+13.8	$17,176
Liberal	Stéphane Deschênes	4,884	9.8	-12.3	$13,839
New Democratic	Joëlle Chevrier	2,723	5.5	+3.0	$1,787
Green	Jacques Tétreault	1,925	3.9	+1.9	$2,091
Total valid votes/Expense limit		49,693	100.0	$77,907	
Total rejected ballots		827	1.6		
Turnout		50,520			

2004 Canadian federal election
Party	Candidate	Votes	%	±%	Expenditures
Bloc Québécois	Yvan Loubier	29,789	62.4	+7.0	$64,430
Liberal	Michel Gaudette	10,558	22.1	-12.7	$74,967
Conservative	Andrée Champagne	5,240	11.0	+2.2	$26,672
New Democratic	Joëlle Chevrier	1,204	2.5	+1.1	$442
Green	Bruno Godbout	948	2.0	–	
Total valid votes/Expense limit		47,739	100.0	$76,246	

Note: Conservative vote is compared to the total of the Canadian Alliance vote and Progressive Conservative vote in 2000 election.

2000 Canadian federal election
Party	Candidate	Votes	%	±%
Bloc Québécois	Yvan Loubier	25,916	55.4	+12.5
Liberal	Michel Gaudette	16,265	34.8	+12.5
Alliance	Jacques Bousquet	2,161	4.6	
Progressive Conservative	Frédéric Mantha	1,932	4.1	-29.0
New Democratic	Rachel Dicaire	499	1.1	-0.6
Total valid votes		46,773	100.0	

1997 Canadian federal election
Party	Candidate	Votes	%	±%
Bloc Québécois	Yvan Loubier	21,116	42.9	-14.5
Progressive Conservative	Jean-François Milette	16,313	33.2	+13.0
Liberal	Antoine Locas	10,970	22.3	+1.6
New Democratic	Jacques Bousquet	809	1.6	-0.1
Total valid votes		49,208	100.0	

1993 Canadian federal election
Party	Candidate	Votes	%	±%
Bloc Québécois	Yvan Loubier	28,014	57.4	
Liberal	Hélène Riendeau	10,124	20.7	-13.2
Progressive Conservative	Andrée Champagne	9,834	20.1	-32.5
New Democratic	Luc Chamberland	848	1.7	-11.7
Total valid votes		48,820	100.0	

1988 Canadian federal election
Party	Candidate	Votes	%	±%
Progressive Conservative	Andrée Champagne	25,267	52.6	+5.3
Liberal	Michel Gaudette	16,289	33.9	-10.1
New Democratic	Hélène Lortie-Narayana	6,442	13.4	
Total valid votes		47,998	100.0	

1984 Canadian federal election
Party	Candidate	Votes	%	±%
Progressive Conservative	Andrée Champagne	22,984	47.3	+23.5
Liberal	Marcel Ostiguy	21,394	44.1	-22.9
New Democratic	Claude R. Gagnon	2,196	4.5	-0.8
Rhinoceros	Serge Alexis Lemoyne	998	2.1	0.0
Parti nationaliste	Bertrand Desrosiers	940	1.9	
Commonwealth of Canada	Laurent Gauthier	33	0.1	
Total valid votes		48,545	100.0	

=== Saint-Hyacinthe, 1966–1980 ===
1980 Canadian federal election
Party	Candidate	Votes	%	±%
Liberal	Marcel Ostiguy	28,130	67.0	13.0
Progressive Conservative	Marcel Danis	10,033	23.9	-4.2
New Democratic	Diane Lemieux	2,257	5.4	+3.5
Rhinoceros	André Chamberland	868	2.1	+0.2
Independent	Sylvain Trudeau	540	1.3	
Union populaire	Louis Fournier De Kinder	114	0.3	+0.1
Marxist–Leninist	Claude Dubois	66	0.2	+0.0
Total valid votes		42,008	100.0	

1979 Canadian federal election
Party	Candidate	Votes	%	±%
Liberal	Marcel Ostiguy	23,666	54.0	0.5
Progressive Conservative	Grégoire Girard	12,327	28.1	-13.0
Social Credit	Raymonde Parent	6,087	13.9	+11.7
New Democratic	Richard Sylvestre	802	1.8	-1.3
Rhinoceros	Mario Bousquet	444	1.0	
Rhinoceros	Serge André Lemoyne	362	0.8	
Union populaire	Louis De Kinder	79	0.2	
Marxist–Leninist	Claude Dubois	68	0.2	
Total valid votes		43,835	100.0	

Canadian federal by-election, 16 October 1978
Party	Candidate	Votes	%	±%
On Mr. Wagner's resignation, 21 April 1978
Liberal	Marcel Ostiguy	21,515	53.5	+15.6
Progressive Conservative	Charles-Auguste Gauvin	16,559	41.2	-9.8
New Democratic	Richard Sylvestre	1,259	3.1	+1.1
Social Credit	Laurier Grenon	889	2.2	-4.8
Total valid votes		40,222	100.0	

1974 Canadian federal election
Party	Candidate	Votes	%	±%
Progressive Conservative	Claude Wagner	21,453	51.0	+12.0
Liberal	Honorius Charbonneau	15,965	37.9	+0.6
Social Credit	Jean-Claude Caron	2,940	7.0	-13.4
Independent	Gaston Caron	883	2.1	
New Democratic	Ann Dewitt	861	2.0	+0.1
Total valid votes		42,102	100.0	

1972 Canadian federal election
Party	Candidate	Votes	%	±%
Progressive Conservative	Claude Wagner	16,680	38.9	-8.5
Liberal	Paul Foster	15,982	37.3	-7.8
Social Credit	Yvon Descoteaux	8,716	20.3	+15.5
New Democratic	Henri Mons	814	1.9	-0.6
Independent	Martha Adams	540	1.3	
Independent	Arthur Vachon	106	0.2	
Total valid votes		42,838	100.0	

Note: Social Credit vote is compared to Ralliement créditiste vote in the 1968 election.

1968 Canadian federal election
Party	Candidate	Votes	%	±%
Progressive Conservative	Théogène Ricard	16,389	47.4	-5.8
Liberal	Maurice Sauvé	15,601	45.2	+4.0
Ralliement créditiste	Jean-Baptiste Auger	1,682	4.9	+1.4
New Democratic	André Lacombe	878	2.5	+0.5
Total valid votes		34,550	100.0	

=== Saint-Hyacinthe—Bagot, 1947–1966 ===
1965 Canadian federal election
Party	Candidate	Votes	%	±%
Progressive Conservative	Théogène Ricard	15,127	53.3	+1.3
Liberal	Michel Dumaine	11,690	41.2	+8.8
Ralliement créditiste	Jean-Baptiste Auger	994	3.5	-12.1
New Democratic	Léon Graub	591	2.1	
Total valid votes		28,402	100.0	

Note: Ralliement créditiste vote is compared to Social Credit vote in the 1963 election.

1963 Canadian federal election
Party	Candidate	Votes	%	±%
Progressive Conservative	Théogène Ricard	13,716	52.0	+5.7
Liberal	Jean Leduc	8,540	32.4	-0.5
Social Credit	François Even	4,122	15.6	-5.2
Total valid votes		26,378	100.0	

1962 Canadian federal election
Party	Candidate	Votes	%	±%
Progressive Conservative	Théogène Ricard	12,586	46.3	-12.6
Liberal	Jean-Baptiste Lemoine	8,945	32.9	-7.7
Social Credit	Ernest Mongeau	5,663	20.8	
Total valid votes		27,194	100.0	

1958 Canadian federal election
Party	Candidate	Votes	%	±%
Progressive Conservative	Théogène Ricard	15,761	58.9	+4.8
Liberal	Charles-Édouard Hébert	10,857	40.5	-5.4
Independent Liberal	Wilfrid Flibotte	157	0.6	
Total valid votes		26,775	100.0	

1957 Canadian federal election
Party	Candidate	Votes	%
Progressive Conservative	Théogène Ricard	13,865	54.1
Liberal	Louis-Joseph Fontaine	11,771	45.9
Total valid votes		25,636	100.0

1953 Canadian federal election
Party	Candidate	Votes
Liberal	Joseph Fontaine	acclaimed

1949 Canadian federal election
Party	Candidate	Votes	%	±%
Liberal	Joseph Fontaine	14,702	87.6	+29.2
Progressive Conservative	Joseph-Lionel Lévesque	1,105	6.6	-26.3
Union des électeurs	Napoléon Hamel	981	5.8	+4.7
Total valid votes		16,788	100.0	

Note: Union des Electeurs popular vote is compared to Social Credit vote in 1945 general election.

=== St. Hyacinthe—Bagot, 1933–1947 ===
1945 Canadian federal election
Party	Candidate	Votes	%	±%
Liberal	Joseph Fontaine	12,781	58.3	-25.2
Progressive Conservative	Séraphin-Adélard Cyr	7,197	32.9	
Independent	Liboire Beauregard	884	4.0	
Independent	Louis-Homère Marcotte	441	2.0	
Independent PC	Raoul Lassonde	346	1.6	
Social Credit	Joseph Blanchette	258	1.2	
Total valid votes		21,907	100.0	

1940 Canadian federal election
Party	Candidate	Votes	%	±%
Liberal	Adélard Fontaine	13,220	83.6	+11.2
Independent	J.-Wilfrid Gaudette	2,599	16.4	
Total valid votes		15,819	100.0	

1935 Canadian federal election
Party	Candidate	Votes	%
Liberal	Adélard Fontaine	11,547	72.4
Conservative	Jean-Baptiste-Joseph-Eugène Bousquet	3,268	20.5
Reconstruction	Hector Grenon	1,138	7.1
Total valid votes		15,953	100.0

== See also ==
- List of Canadian electoral districts
- Historical federal electoral districts of Canada
