= Émilien Pelletier =

Canadian politician

MNA for Saint-Hyacinthe
- In office 2008–2014
- Preceded by: Claude L'Écuyer
- Succeeded by: Chantal Soucy

Personal details
- Born: September 13, 1945 (age 80) Rivière-Bleue, Quebec, Canada
- Party: Parti Québécois
- Spouse: Francine Lauzon

Émilien Pelletier (born September 13, 1945) is a Canadian politician in the province of Quebec. Pelletier was elected to represent the riding of Saint-Hyacinthe in the National Assembly of Quebec in the 2008 provincial election. He is a member of the Parti Québécois.

Pelletier attended several schools in several different fields. He attended the Collège Notre-Dame-des-Champs, in Sully from 1958 to 1963 in sciences and letters. He then followed several courses related to electricity and electronics at Université de Montréal, the Institut in Technology in Rimouski and the CEGEP Édouard-Montpetit. Pelletier then followed courses at CEGEP de Saint-Hyacinthe in computer sciences, human work behavior and retiring training. Pelletier worked for Hydro-Québec for over 30 years as a technician and drawer. He also briefly worked as a teacher at the Richelieu-Yamaska school board at an adult institution.

In politics, he was elected to the municipal council of Saint-Hyacinthe in 2000 and re-elected in 2002 (without opposition) and 2005. Pelletier is a long-time member of the Parti Québécois since 1970 and was a member of former Premier René Lévesque's Sovereignty Association Movement in 1968. He is also a long-time member of the Knights of Columbus, the Bloc Québécois and the Société Saint-Jean-Baptiste.
