= Yvan Loubier =

Canadian politician

Member of Parliament for Saint-Hyacinthe-Bagot
- In office October 25, 1993 – February 21, 2007
- Preceded by: Andrée Champagne
- Succeeded by: Ève-Mary Thaï Thi Lac

Personal details
- Born: April 10, 1959 (age 67) Montreal, Quebec, Canada
- Party: Bloc Québécois
- Occupation: Economist

Yvan Loubier (born April 10, 1959 in Montreal, Quebec) is a Canadian politician and one of the founders of the Bloc Québécois. He was a Bloc Québécois member of the House of Commons of Canada representing the district of Saint-Hyacinthe—Bagot, from the since he was first elected in the 1993 election, until his resignation on February 21, 2007.

Prior to being elected he was a consultant in economic policies and international trade and was an economist. At the time of his resignation, he was chair of the Subcommittee on Fiscal Imbalance and is the Bloc's Finance critic. He has also in the past been the critic of Western Economic Diversification, International Financial Institutions, Indian Affairs and Northern Development, Intergovernmental Affairs, and Public Safety and Emergency Preparedness.

On September 8, 2006 Loubier announced that he would not seek re-election at the next federal election but will remain a militant for the sovereignty of Quebec. On February 21, 2007 he resigned from the House of Commons to run for the Parti Québécois in the 2007 Quebec general election in the riding of Chutes-de-la-Chaudière. He came in second with 18.43% of the vote.
