= Marcel Ostiguy =

Canadian politician (1929–2014)

Marcel Ostiguy (14 May 1929 – 21 January 2014) was a Canadian industrialist, businessman and politician. Ostiguy served as a Liberal Party member of the House of Commons of Canada.

== Member of the National Assembly ==
Born in Saint-Mathias-de-Rouville, Quebec, Ostiguy won a seat to the National Assembly of Quebec in the 1970 election in Rouville as a Liberal and re-elected in Verchères in the 1973 election. He lost his bid for re-election in the 1976 election against Parti Québécois candidate Jean-Pierre Charbonneau.

== Federal politics ==
Ostiguy represented Quebec's Saint-Hyacinthe electoral district since winning a by-election there on 16 October 1978. He was re-elected at the riding in the 1979 and 1980 federal elections, but lost in the 1984 federal election to Andrée Champagne of the Progressive Conservative Party. He served in the latter months of the 30th Canadian Parliament and for full terms in the 31st and 32nd Canadian Parliaments.
