= Saint-Hyacinthe (provincial electoral district) =

Provincial electoral district in Quebec, Canada

Coordinates: 45°37′N 72°57′W

Quebec electoral district

Provincial electoral district
- Legislature: National Assembly of Quebec
MNA
Simon-Pierre Savard-Tremblay
Parti Québécois
- District created: 1867
- First contested: 1867
- Last contested: 2026

Demographics
- Electors (2012): 56,870
- Area (km²): 833.2
- Census division: Les Maskoutains (part)
- Census subdivision(s): La Présentation, Saint-Barnabé-Sud, Saint-Damase, Sainte-Madeleine, Sainte-Marie-Madeleine, Saint-Hugues, Saint-Hyacinthe, Saint-Simon

Saint-Hyacinthe is a provincial electoral district in the Montérégie region of Quebec, Canada. It notably includes the cities of Saint-Hyacinthe and Saint-Pie.

It was created for the 1867 election (and an electoral district of that name existed earlier in the Legislative Assembly of the Province of Canada and the Legislative Assembly of Lower Canada).

In the change from the 2001 to the 2011 electoral map, it gained La Présentation from Verchères electoral district and Saint-Pie from Iberville electoral district.

In 2026, it gained Sainte-Madeleine and Sainte-Marie-Madeleine, while losing Saint-Liboire, Saint-Dominique, and Saint-Pie.

== Members of the Legislative Assembly / National Assembly ==
Legislature	Years	Member	Party
1st	1867–1871	Pierre Bachand	Liberal
2nd	1871–1875	Pierre Bachand	Liberal
3rd	1875–1878	Pierre Bachand	Liberal
4th	1878–1878†	Pierre Bachand	Liberal
4th	1879–1881	Honoré Mercier	Liberal
5th	1881–1886	Honoré Mercier	Liberal
6th	1886–1890	Honoré Mercier	Liberal
7th	1890–1892	Odilon Desmarais	Liberal
8th	1892–1897	Antoine-Paul Cartier	Conservative
9th	1897–1900	Georges-Casimir Dessaulles	Liberal
10th	1900–1904	Joseph Morin	Liberal
11th	1904–1908	Joseph Morin	Liberal
12th	1908–1912	Henri Bourassa	Ligue nationaliste canadienne
13th	1912–1916	Télesphore-Damien Bouchard	Liberal
14th	1916–1919	Télesphore-Damien Bouchard	Liberal
15th	1919–1923	Armand Boisseau	Liberal
16th	1923–1927	Télesphore-Damien Bouchard	Liberal
17th	1927–1931	Télesphore-Damien Bouchard	Liberal
18th	1931–1935	Télesphore-Damien Bouchard	Liberal
19th	1935–1936	Télesphore-Damien Bouchard	Liberal
20th	1936–1939	Télesphore-Damien Bouchard	Liberal
21st	1939–1944	Télesphore-Damien Bouchard	Liberal
22nd	1944–1948	Ernest-Joseph Chartier	Union Nationale
23rd	1948–1952	Ernest-Joseph Chartier	Union Nationale
24th	1952–1954	Ernest-Joseph Chartier	Union Nationale
24th	1955–1956	Pierre-Jacques-François Bousquet	Union Nationale
25th	1956–1960	René Saint-Pierre	Liberal
26th	1960–1962	René Saint-Pierre	Liberal
27th	1962–1966	René Saint-Pierre	Liberal
28th	1966–1970	Denis Bousquet	Union Nationale
29th	1970–1973	Fernand Cornellier	Liberal
30th	1973–1976	Fernand Cornellier	Liberal
31st	1976–1981	Fabien Cordeau	Union Nationale
32nd	1981–1985	Maurice Dupré	Parti Québécois
33rd	1985–1989	Charles Messier	Liberal
34th	1989–1994	Charles Messier	Liberal
35th	1994–1998	Léandre Dion	Parti Québécois
36th	1998–2003	Léandre Dion	Parti Québécois
37th	2003–2007	Léandre Dion	Parti Québécois
38th	2007–2008	Claude L'Écuyer	Action démocratique
39th	2008–2012	Émilien Pelletier	Parti Québécois
40th	2012–2014	Émilien Pelletier	Parti Québécois
41st	2014–2018	Chantal Soucy	Coalition Avenir Québec
42nd	2018–2022	Chantal Soucy	Coalition Avenir Québec
43rd	2022–2026	Chantal Soucy	Coalition Avenir Québec
44th	2026–Present	Simon-Pierre Savard-Tremblay	Parti Québécois

== Election results ==
2026 Quebec general election
Party	Candidate	Votes	%	±%
Parti Québécois	Simon-Pierre Savard-Tremblay	15,354	39.07	+22.42
Conservative	Alexandre Dion-Rolland	6,988	17.78	+8.33
Coalition Avenir Québec	Jessika Gardner	6,835	17.39	-37.48
Liberal	Mariliz Turla-Vadnais	6,267	15.95	+11.66
Québec solidaire	Philippe Daigneault	3,470	8.83	-4.70
Parti culinaire	Julie Desmarais	382	0.97	New
Total valid votes		39,296	98.15	
Total rejected ballots		740	1.85	
Turnout		40,036	71.87	
Eligible voters		55,710		
Parti Québécois gain from Coalition Avenir Québec		Swing		+
Source(s). Élections Québec https://www.electionsquebec.qc.ca/resultats-et-statistiques/resultats-elections-generales-provinciales-en-direct/.

2022 Quebec general election redistributed results
Party	Vote	%
Coalition Avenir Québec	20,199	54.87
Parti Québécois	6,131	16.65
Québec solidaire	4,981	13.53
Conservative	3,478	9.45
Liberal	1,580	4.29
Others	444	1.21

2022 Quebec general election
Party	Candidate	Votes	%	±%
Coalition Avenir Québec	Chantal Soucy	22,487	54.42	+2.42
Parti Québécois	Alexis Gagné-Lebrun	6,900	16.70	+0.72
Québec solidaire	Philippe Daigneault	5,636	13.64	–2.78
Conservative	Kim Beaudoin	4,066	9.84	–
Liberal	Agnieszka Wnorowska	1,705	4.13	–9.98
Green	Mustapha Jaalouk	217	0.53	–
Climat Québec	Julie Raiche	168	0.41	–
Independent	Gary Daigneault	142	0.34	–
Total valid votes		41,321	98.34	+0.49
Total rejected ballots		697	1.66	–0.49
Turnout		42,018	70.47	–0.99
Electors on the lists		59,625	–	–

2018 Quebec general election
Party	Candidate	Votes	%	±%
Coalition Avenir Québec	Chantal Soucy	21,227	52.00	+19.26
Québec solidaire	Marijo Demers	6,826	16.72	+9.78
Parti Québécois	Daniel Breton	6,524	15.98	-13.74
Liberal	Annie Pelletier	5,758	14.11	-18.81
New Democratic	Luc Chulak	486	1.19	
Total valid votes		40,821	97.85	
Total rejected ballots		898	2.15	
Turnout		41,719	71.46	
Eligible voters		58,377		
Coalition Avenir Québec hold		Swing		+4.74
Source(s) "Rapport des résultats officiels du scrutin". Élections Québec.

2014 Quebec general election
Party	Candidate	Votes	%	±%
Coalition Avenir Québec	Chantal Soucy	13,245	32.74	+1.63
Parti Québécois	Émilien Pelletier	12,023	29.72	-6.82
Liberal	Louise Arpin	11,701	28.92	+4.95
Québec solidaire	Danielle Pelland	2,806	6.94	+1.94
Option nationale	Éric Pothier	374	0.92	-0.90
Conservative	Simon Labbé	304	0.75	+0.06
Total valid votes		40,453	97.77	
Total rejected ballots		923	2.23	
Turnout		41,376	71.58	
Electors on the lists		57,803		
Coalition Avenir Québec gain from Parti Québécois		Swing		+4.23

2012 Quebec general election
Party	Candidate	Votes	%	±%
Parti Québécois	Émilien Pelletier	16,082	36.32	-2.24
Coalition Avenir Québec	Pierre Schetagne	13,962	31.53	+12.86
Liberal	Louise Arpin	10,552	23.83	-12.85
Québec solidaire	Richard Gingras	2,198	4.96	+1.98
Option nationale	Jérôme St-Amand	803	1.81	
Conservative	Isabelle Leclerc	306	0.69	
Quebec Citizens' Union	Thomas Gagné	149	0.34	
Équipe Autonomiste	Alexandre Bruneau	129	0.29	
Unité Nationale	Lise Gaudette	95	0.21	
Total valid votes		44,276	98.47	
Total rejected ballots		686	1.53	
Turnout		44,962	78.68	
Electors on the lists		57,142	–	
Parti Québécois hold		Swing		-7.55

^ Change is from redistributed results; CAQ change is from ADQ

2008 Quebec general election
Party	Candidate	Votes	%	±%
Parti Québécois	Émilien Pelletier	11,822	38.07	
Liberal	Claude Corbeil	11,609	37.38	
Action démocratique	Claude L'Ecuyer	5,690	18.32	
Green	Louis-Pierre Beaudry	975	3.14	–
Québec solidaire	Richard Gingras	957	3.08	

== See also ==
- List of Quebec provincial electoral districts
- Canadian provincial electoral districts
