= Saint-Damase, Montérégie =

Saint-Damase
- Municipality
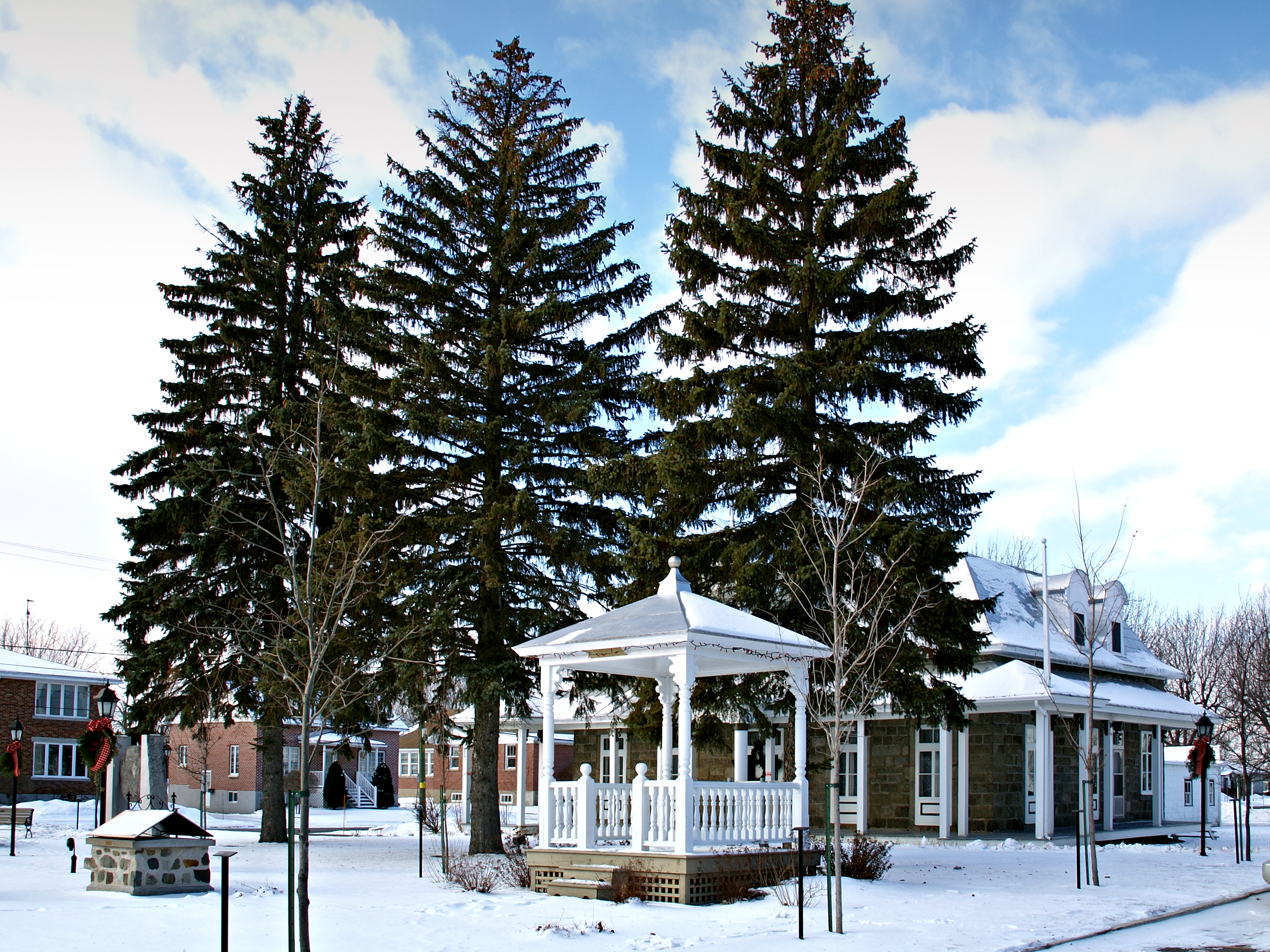
- Motto: Labor et Probitas (Work and Honesty)
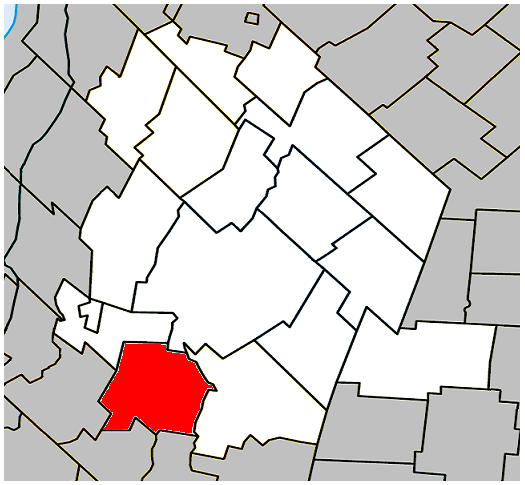
- Location within Les Maskoutains RCM

- Location in southern Quebec
- Coordinates: 45°32′N 73°00′W
- Country: Canada
- Province: Quebec
- Region: Montérégie
- RCM: Les Maskoutains
- Constituted: October 5, 2001

Government
  - Mayor: Pierre-Luc Barré
  - Federal riding: Saint-Hyacinthe—Bagot—Acton
  - Prov. riding: Saint-Hyacinthe

Area
  - Total: 80.90 km^{2} (31.24 sq mi)
  - Land: 79.65 km^{2} (30.75 sq mi)

Population (2021)
  - Total: 2,447
  - Density: 30.7/km^{2} (80/sq mi)
  - Pop 2016-2021: ▼1.1%
  - Dwellings: 1,056
- Time zone: UTC−5 (EST)
  - Summer (DST): UTC−4 (EDT)
- Postal code(s): J0H 1J0
- Area codes: 450 and 579
- Highways: R-231; R-233
- Website: www.st-damase.qc.ca

Saint-Damase (French pronunciation: [sɛ̃ damaz]) is a municipality located in Les Maskoutains Regional County Municipality in the Montérégie region of Quebec. The population as of the Canada 2021 Census was 2,447. The municipality was created on October 5, 2001, by the merger of the Parish and the Village of Saint-Damase.

== Demographics ==
=== Population ===
Canada census – Saint-Damase community profile

	2021	2016	2011
Population	2,447 (-1.1% from 2016)	2,473 (-1.3% from 2011)	2,506 (+0.8% from 2006)
Land area	79.65 km^{2} (30.75 sq mi)	79.70 km^{2} (30.77 sq mi)	79.07 km^{2} (30.53 sq mi)
Population density	30.7/km^{2} (80/sq mi)	31.0/km^{2} (80/sq mi)	31.7/km^{2} (82/sq mi)
Median age	44.4 (M: 43.6, F: 44.8)	43.1 (M: 42.7, F: 43.8)	41.3 (M: 41.1, F: 41.4)
Private dwellings	1,025 (total)	1,043 (total)	1,025 (total)
Median household income	$82,000	$71,296	$65,287

References: 2021 2016 2011

Historical Census Data - Saint-Damase, Quebec

Year	Pop.	±%
2006	2,486	—
2011	2,506	+0.8%

Year	Pop.	±%
2016	2,473	−1.3%
2021	2,447	−1.1%

Year	Pop.	±%

=== Language ===
Canada Census Mother Tongue - Saint-Damase, Quebec
Census	Total	French			English			French & English			Other		
Year	Responses	Count	Trend	Pop %	Count	Trend	Pop %	Count	Trend	Pop %	Count	Trend	Pop %
2021	2,445	2,385	▼0.2%	97.5%	20	▲33.3%	0.8%	10	▼50.0%	0.4%	20	▼60.0%	0.8%
2016	2,470	2,390	▼2.8%	96.8%	15	0.0%	0.6%	20	▲300.0%	0.8%	50	▲150.0%	2.0%
2011	2,500	2,460	▲1.0%	98.4%	15	▲50.0%	0.6%	5	▲ n/a%	0.2%	20	0.0%	0.8%
2006	2,465	2,435	n/a	98.8%	10	n/a	0.4%	0	n/a	0.0%	20	n/a	0.8%

== See also ==
- List of municipalities in Quebec
