= Simon-Pierre Savard-Tremblay =

Canadian politician (born 1988)

Simon-Pierre Savard-Tremblay MNA
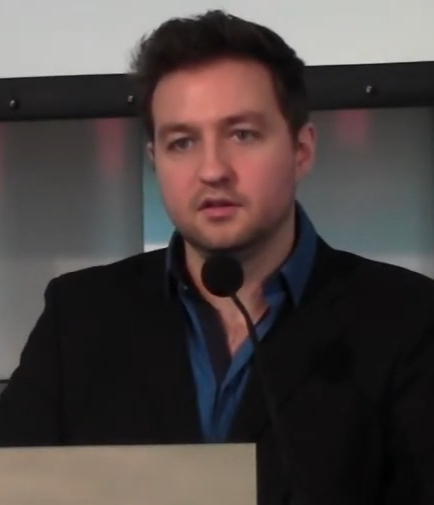
- Savard-Tremblay in 2015

Minister responsible for Relations with the First Nations and the Inuit
- Incumbent
- Assumed office October 21, 2026
- Premier: Paul St-Pierre Plamondon
- Preceded by: Ian Lafrenière

Member of the National Assembly for Saint-Hyacinthe
- Incumbent
- Assumed office October 5, 2026
- Preceded by: Chantal Soucy

Member of Parliament for Saint-Hyacinthe—Bagot—Acton
- In office October 21, 2019 – June 19, 2026
- Preceded by: Brigitte Sansoucy

Personal details
- Born: May 11, 1988 (age 38) Quebec City, Quebec, Canada
- Party: Parti Québécois
- Other political affiliations: Bloc Québécois (federal, until 2026)
- Profession: Essayist

Simon-Pierre Savard-Tremblay (born May 11, 1988) is a Canadian politician who has served as Quebec's Minister Responsible for Relations with the First Nations and the Inuit since October 21, 2026. A member of the Parti Québécois, he has represented Saint-Hyacinthe in the National Assembly of Quebec since October 2026. He previously served as a member of Parliament representing Saint-Hyacinthe—Bagot and its successor riding in the House of Commons of Canada from 2019 to 2026, initially as a member of the Bloc Québécois.

== Biography ==
Simon-Pierre Savard-Tremblay grew up in Quebec City before settling in Montreal to follow his college studies in economic and social sciences at Collège Stanislas. He holds a bachelor's degree in political science from the Université de Montréal and a master's degree in sociology from the Université du Québec in Montreal. In 2018 he obtained a doctorate in socio-economics of development from the School for Advanced Studies in the Social Sciences in Paris, under the supervision of Jacques Sapir and Florence Weber.

Savard-Tremblay's involvement in politics led him to chair the Forum jeunesse du Bloc Québécois from 2010 to 2012, notably during the 2011 federal election.

He was active as a columnist in the media for several years, contributing to a blog at the Journal de Montréal.

Savard-Tremblay first defended conservative positions. This has gradually moved away to adopt a similar posture of left nationalism and economic nationalism and hostile to neoliberalism. He openly admires the British economist John Maynard Keynes, whom he describes as "the greatest economist of the 20th century" and "the great thinker of society".

In April 2019, Savard-Tremblay launched his campaign for the nomination of the Bloc Québécois in the riding of Saint-Hyacinthe—Bagot. He was elected as Member of Parliament in the federal elections of October 2019.

Since 2021, he has served as the critic of international trade, aerospace and cars in the Bloc Québécois Shadow Cabinet.

He was elected vice chair of the Canadian House of Commons Standing Committee on International Trade and the Canadian House of Commons Standing Committee on National Defence in the 45th Canadian Parliament in 2025.

Prior to the 2026 Quebec general election, Savard-Tremblay resigned as a member of the Bloc Quebecois (but not as a federal MP) to run, and was subsequently elected after running as the Parti Quebecois candidate in Saint-Hyacinthe. After the election, he was made a member of the St-Pierre Plamondon ministry as the Minister Responsible for Relations with First Nations and Inuit; Savard-Tremblay is the first Indigenous person to hold this post.

== Personal life ==
Savard-Tremblay is a member of the Wendat Nation.

== Electoral history ==
2026 Quebec general election: Saint-Hyacinthe
Party	Candidate	Votes	%	±%
Parti Québécois	Simon-Pierre Savard-Tremblay	15,354	39.07	+22.42
Conservative	Alexandre Dion-Rolland	6,988	17.78	+8.33
Coalition Avenir Québec	Jessika Gardner	6,835	17.39	-37.48
Liberal	Mariliz Turla-Vadnais	6,267	15.95	+11.66
Québec solidaire	Philippe Daigneault	3,470	8.83	-4.70
Parti culinaire	Julie Desmarais	382	0.97	New
Total valid votes		39,296	98.15	
Total rejected ballots		740	1.85	
Turnout		40,036	71.87	
Eligible voters		55,710		
Parti Québécois gain from Coalition Avenir Québec		Swing		+
Source(s). Élections Québec https://www.electionsquebec.qc.ca/resultats-et-statistiques/resultats-elections-generales-provinciales-en-direct/.

2025 Canadian federal election: Saint-Hyacinthe—Bagot—Acton
Party	Candidate	Votes	%	±%	Expenditures
Bloc Québécois	Simon-Pierre Savard-Tremblay	25,447	43.88	–3.57	$60,384.29
Liberal	Mélanie Bédard	19,504	33.64	+10.95	$15,238.91
Conservative	Gaëtan Deschênes	10,431	17.99	+4.48	$17,122.71
New Democratic	Raymonde Plamondon	1,373	2.37	–9.27	$385.85
Green	Martin Grenier	800	1.38	N/A	$0.00
People's	Sylvain Pariseau	431	0.74	–1.98	$0.00
Total valid votes/expense limit		57,986	98.18	+0.83	$130,809.39
Total rejected ballots		1,072	1.82	–0.83	
Turnout		59,058	69.94	+4.52	
Eligible voters		84,439			
Bloc Québécois hold		Swing		–7.26	
Source: Elections Canada

2021 Canadian federal election
Party	Candidate	Votes	%	±%	Expenditures
Bloc Québécois	Simon-Pierre Savard-Tremblay	25,165	47.5	+6.1	$42,791.75
Liberal	Caroline-Joan Boucher	12,030	22.7	+1.4	$13,920.17
Conservative	André Lepage	7,166	13.5	-0.9	$48,511.65
New Democratic	Brigitte Sansoucy	6,170	11.6	-6.8	$17,351.86
People's	Sylvain Pariseau	1,445	2.7	+1.8	$0.00
Free	Sébastien Desautels	1,055	2.0	N/A	$1,439.69
Total valid votes/Expense limit		53,031	97.4	–	$112,852.48
Total rejected ballots		1,439	2.6		
Turnout		54,470	65.6		
Eligible voters		83,086			
Bloc Québécois hold		Swing		+2.4	
Source: Elections Canada

2019 Canadian federal election: Saint-Hyacinthe—Bagot
Party	Candidate	Votes	%	±%	Expenditures
Bloc Québécois	Simon-Pierre Savard-Tremblay	23,143	41.4	+17.1	$26,447.17
Liberal	René Vincelette	11,903	21.3	-6.3	$49,472.90
New Democratic	Brigitte Sansoucy	10,297	18.4	-10.3	$48,330.94
Conservative	Bernard Barré	8,062	14.4	-2.3	$44,085.44
Green	Sabrina Huet-Côté	2,031	3.6	+1.3	none listed
People's	Jean-François Bélanger	478	0.9	–	none listed
Total valid votes/expense limit		55,914	97.57		
Total rejected ballots		1,391	2.43	+0.25	
Turnout		57,305	70.1	+1.3	
Eligible voters		81,792			
Bloc Québécois gain from New Democratic		Swing		+11.7	
Source: Elections Canada
