= Ève-Mary Thaï Thi Lac =

Canadian politician (born 1972)

Member of Parliament for Saint-Hyacinthe—Bagot
- In office September 17, 2007 – May 2, 2011
- Preceded by: Yvan Loubier
- Succeeded by: Marie-Claude Morin

Personal details
- Born: February 6, 1972 (age 54) Vietnam
- Party: Bloc Québécois
- Profession: Political assistant

Ève-Mary Thaï Thi Lac (born February 6, 1972) is a former Canadian politician. She served as a member of Parliament for the Bloc Québécois in the riding of Saint-Hyacinthe—Bagot from 2007 to 2011. She was the first Vietnamese Canadian ever elected to the Canadian House of Commons.

== Early life ==
Born in Vietnam to a Cham family, Thi Lac was adopted at age two by a Quebec family and grew up on a farm near Acton Vale.

== Career ==
Prior to her election, she worked for her predecessor, Yvan Loubier, as an executive assistant in his constituency office.

== Political career ==
She was elected to the House of Commons of Canada on September 17, 2007, as the Bloc Québécois candidate in the Saint-Hyacinthe—Bagot by-election, defeating the Conservative candidate Bernard Barré.

She acknowledged that racism was a factor at the outset of her campaign, but stressed her local roots by joking that having grown up on a farm, she was the only candidate in the race who knew how to castrate a pig. She later credited her willingness to simply talk to people as her most effective strategy:

I feel it enormously, but I explain my origins and people are receptive. I would say what scares people a little is difference, but when they speak to me, when they see me, when I am asked about my values, they see no difference between them and me.

She was re-elected in the 2008 election, but was defeated in the 2011 election by Marie-Claude Morin of the New Democratic Party.

== Electoral record ==
2011 Canadian federal election
Party	Candidate	Votes	%	±%	Expenditures
New Democratic	Marie-Claude Morin	26,963	52.4	+38.4	
Bloc Québécois	Ève-Mary Thaï Thi Lac	12,651	24.6	-22.7	
Conservative	Jean-Guy Dagenais	8,108	15.7	-5.5	
Liberal	Denis Vallée	2,784	5.4	-8.4	
Green	Johany Beaudoin-Bussières	994	1.9	-1.8	
Total valid votes/Expense limit		51,500	100.0		
Total rejected ballots		863	1.6	–	
Turnout		52,363	66.2	–	
Eligible voters		79,085	–	–	
New Democratic gain from Bloc Québécois		Swing		+30.55	

2008 Canadian federal election
Party	Candidate	Votes	%	±%
Bloc Québécois	Ève-Mary Thaï Thi Lac	22,719	47.3%	+5.2
Conservative	René Vincelette	10,203	21.2%	-16.0
New Democratic	Brigitte Sansoucy	6,721	14.0%	+6.1
Liberal	Denise Tremblay	6,638	13.8%	+6.4
Green	Jacques Tétreault	1,771	3.7%	+0.0
Total		48,052		

By-election on September 17, 2007
Party	Candidate	Votes	%	±%
Bloc Québécois	Ève-Mary Thaï Thi Lac	13,443	42.1%	-13.9
Conservative	Bernard Barré	11,965	37.5%	+12.7
New Democratic	Brigitte Sansoucy	2,538	7.9%	+2.4
Liberal	Jean Caumartin	2,379	7.4%	-2.4
Green	Jacques Tétreault	1,169	3.7%	-0.2
Rhinoceros	Christian Willie Vanasse	384	1.2%	
Canadian Action	Michel St-Onge	61	0.19%	
Total		31,949		
