= De la Concorde overpass collapse =

2006 highway bridge collapse in Canada

Coordinates: 45°35′0.6″N 73°40′30.94″W

The De la Concorde overpass collapse occurred at a bridge over Quebec Autoroute 19 in Laval, Quebec, Canada, at midday on September 30, 2006. On that Saturday, around 12:30 pm, the centre section of the south lane of an overpass (65-foot or 19.8-metre section of a three-lane overpass) collapsed in Laval, a suburb of Montreal, on Boulevard de la Concorde running over Autoroute 19. The collapsed section crushed two vehicles under it, killing five people and seriously injuring six others who went over the edge while travelling on the overpass. The north-lane half, along the same bridge, did not collapse. The autoroute was closed for almost four weeks, "disabling an important north-south link between Montreal and its northern suburbs as well as the Laurentian region".

== Immediately before ==
A number of people had noticed that the overpass was not in good shape:

1. "People living near de la Concorde and Highway 19 told The Gazette they had noticed the overpass had begun to crumble in recent months"
2. Carole Hackenbeck, less than a month before the collapse, noticed that there were "unusually large gaps and misaligned spacing in the deck-support structure underneath".
3. "One witness told TVA television network that he noticed the road had sunk an inch or two when he travelled over the overpass minutes before the collapse, and he called emergency dispatchers".
4. Also, "several motorists told the French-language all-news network Le Canal Nouvelles (LCN) that they had called police up to an hour before the collapse to report seeing fissures appearing in the overpass roadbed and chunks of concrete falling to the road below".

=== Responses to calls ===
When the Quebec Ministry of Transport was contacted regarding blocks of concrete falling onto Autoroute 19 from the Concorde Boulevard overpass above, a patroller was sent to do a sight and sound test to gauge whether the road should be closed and to clear away the concrete hazards; this was 30 minutes before the collapse. Neither roads were closed as the official concluded that the bridge presented no immediate danger. The patroller however did demand that an inspection be carried out as soon as possible, but was told "that an inspector would show up only on Monday, two days later".

The Ministry also sent out messages to journalists and traffic reporters warning of the concrete debris; this was confirmed by Josée Seguin, a spokeswoman for the Ministry.

== Bridge history and design problems ==
The overpass on the Boulevard de la Concorde (Concorde Boulevard) was built in 1970 and was expected to have a life span of 70 years, of which it only lasted 36. David Lau, as part of an article for the Ottawa Citizen, suggests that this estimation of 70 years was inaccurate. They underestimated traffic volumes; they also did not take into account that "the amount and weight of trucks [on] today's roadways are significantly higher". He noted, "30 or 40 years ago, engineers could not anticipate the traffic some of their bridges would be forced to accommodate in the coming decades".

The design of the overpass was considered innovative at the time; however, this design made it nearly impossible to inspect thoroughly, as the entire deck would have had to be removed for such an inspection.

Michel Després (Transport Minister of Quebec) stated that it was inspected once a year, and got a more in-depth inspection once every three years, as per the usual inspection requirements in Quebec, last being May 2005. Ken Bontius, a civil/structural engineer at Hatch Mott MacDonald adds that the bridge was examined bi-annually by structural engineers.

== The aftermath ==
After the collapse of the overpass, the government moved quickly to rescue survivors, remove the dead, and clear away the debris. The Ministère du Transport du Québec (MTQ) immediately requested that any overpasses of similar design in Quebec be identified. Of several such overpasses, only the de Blois overpass adjacent to the collapsed overpass was confirmed as similar. Indeed, this overpass was built in the same construction project as the de la Concorde overpass and was later found to have had the same flaws. It was closed to traffic less than three hours after the collapse and subsequently demolished.

=== Behavioural effects ===
The Monday (October 2) following the collapse, as everyone was trying to get to work, three major expressways into Montreal from Laval were gridlocked with vehicle line-ups stretching for kilometres. "Traffic was backed up as early as 6:00 am on Autoroute 25 and Autoroute 15".

Normal traffic flows along Autoroute 19 amount to 57,000 vehicles per day in both directions. The collapse caused some changes to these figures with motorists choosing different routes (mainly official detour routes), changing the time they left for work (earlier or later) or change in mode (to bus, metro, etc.) being the main responses.

=== Agency responses ===
In response to the incident, the Quebec government instigated several strategies to speed the recovery effort and to minimise the inconvenience of commuters. The Quebec government made it a priority to rescue survivors, remove the dead and the debris from Autoroute 19. The demolition work (of the Concorde Boulevard) closed Autoroute 19 for a little under four weeks and caused "motorists [to] get up earlier and use special buses to commute into the city". These buses were shuttles provided to ferry commuters between new park and ride sites and subway stations.

The government also put detour routes in place, urged commuters to take public transport and to carpool. CAA-Quebec, a non-profit organisation also has urged commuters to consider carpooling as an alternative to driving, suggesting their free carpool ride-sharing program which allows drivers and passengers to network to organise carpools. Transit authorities in Laval and Montreal also increased services on some routes to accommodate more commuters:

- An extra commuter train (on loan from Ontario's GO Transit commuter rail to assist with higher rider numbers)
- Extra park-and-ride parking lots including a free bus shuttle to subway stations - to encourage commuters to not use the already overtaxed detour routes
- Reserved bus lanes extended
- Adding 6 km (3.5 mi) to two high-frequency bus routes
- More buses

Montreal Gazette transit journalist Andy Riga (2006) interviewed Marc LaForge, from the Société de transport de Laval, about the transport department suing Transport Quebec to pay for all these extra services:

"Laval's transit authority - the Société de transport de Laval - is asking for $312,500, for now. That's $12,000 for each of the 25 weekdays from October 2nd to November 3rd on which it provided extra services for commuters whose routes were affected by the collapse".

Costs also included paying overtime to drivers.

==== Detour routes ====
The official detour routes were as follows:

- Autoroute 25
- Autoroute 15
- Autoroute 40
- Autoroute 440
- Route 335
- Route 148

==== Donations from other provinces ====
To aid Laval commuters, and to help the province cope with traffic problems, Ontario donated a "GO Train" to increase ridership in the wake of the weekend collapse. Ontario's premier Dalton McGuinty - "[Quebec officials] tell me there has been an increase, [a] fairly dramatic increase, in demand for the rail." Also "There's a rail line that runs along the site of the tragedy, and more and more people want to use that rail line".

== Official inquiry ==
On October 3, 2006, the Government of Quebec called a commission of inquiry to determine the cause of the collapse. Just over a year later, on October 15, 2007, the Inquiry Commission released a report of its findings. This report recounts the events just before, during, and after the collapse, discusses the overpass design and history, identifies the cause of the collapse as well as other contributing factors, suggests who is directly responsible for the collapse, and makes recommendations to prevent such an event from recurring.

== Determined causes ==
The commissioners agreed that the overpass collapsed due to shear failure in the southeast abutment. This was due to a horizontal plane fracture that had slowly grown over the years. The fracture allowed the part of the abutment below it to break away from the part above, causing the collapse.

The three main causes of the fracture and subsequent collapse were:

- During design, the steel reinforcement was concentrated in one layer, causing a weak plane. This did not contravene the code provisions of the time.
- During construction, the reinforcement was not put into the proper locations, as defined in the design, exacerbating the design weakness. The contractors and inspecting engineers were blamed by the commission for this cause.
- A low quality concrete was used in the abutments, causing poor freeze-thaw behavior. This was blamed on poor communication at all levels, including that of the government-defined requirements at the time

Three other contributing causes were identified by the committee, but not agreed to by all the experts.

- All thick reinforced concrete slabs should have shear reinforcing, and this is a deficiency in the existing bridge design code.
- Proper waterproofing was never installed, even during the bridge repairs done in 1992.
- Extensive concrete removal and rebar exposure caused during the 1992 repairs caused weakening of the structure.

The final report names four individuals who were responsible for unprofessional work on the overpass:

- Marcel Dubois, engineer with Desjardins Sauriol et Associés (DSA), for improper supervision during construction
- Claude Robert, president of Acier d'Armature de Montréal (AAM), for poor quality control caused by passing off responsibilities
- Tiona Sanogo, engineer, for the damage caused during the 1992 repairs
- Christian Mercier, engineer, for an incomplete inspection of the overpass in 2004

== Policy changes ==
This event, and another similar overpass collapse in 2000, have increased scrutiny of Quebec's infrastructure and has led to increased efforts to detect signs of wear in aged structures. Accused of consistently putting off repairs to pass balanced budgets, the Quebec government has since increased spending on highways and projects and has increased infrastructure spending for future budgets.

This was welcome news to the Canadian Council of Professional Engineers (CCPE) as they had been campaigning for infrastructure renewal and maintenance. "Hopefully this tragic event did not happen in vain and we, as a society, will learn from it and make the conscious decision to re-invest in infrastructure using a long-term, holistic approach as well as life-cycle management guidelines", Marie Lemay the CEO of CCPE said. "Long-term adequate financial resources are needed from all levels of government in order to support a sustainable and planned approach over the full life cycle of any infrastructure project".

In July 2007, incidentally just weeks before the I-35W Mississippi River bridge collapse, the Quebec department of transports issued a list of 135 overpasses that were considered potentially unsafe. These overpasses were put under close scrutiny and closed to all overweight trucks (in excess of 20 tonnes). Also, the City of Montreal issued a list of a few overpasses under its own responsibility, citing that those were also under close scrutiny and closed to overweight traffic. The day after the I-35W Mississippi River bridge collapse, the City of Montreal revised its policies for one of those, the Henri-Bourassa overpass above Pie IX Boulevard, closing it completely to all trucks. This overpass has since been demolished and replaced with an at-grade intersection.

As of April 2008, 28 bridges in Quebec are slated to be demolished due to structural deficiencies, and 25 are to receive major repairs.
