= Île-aux-Tourtes Bridge =

Île aux Tourtes Bridge
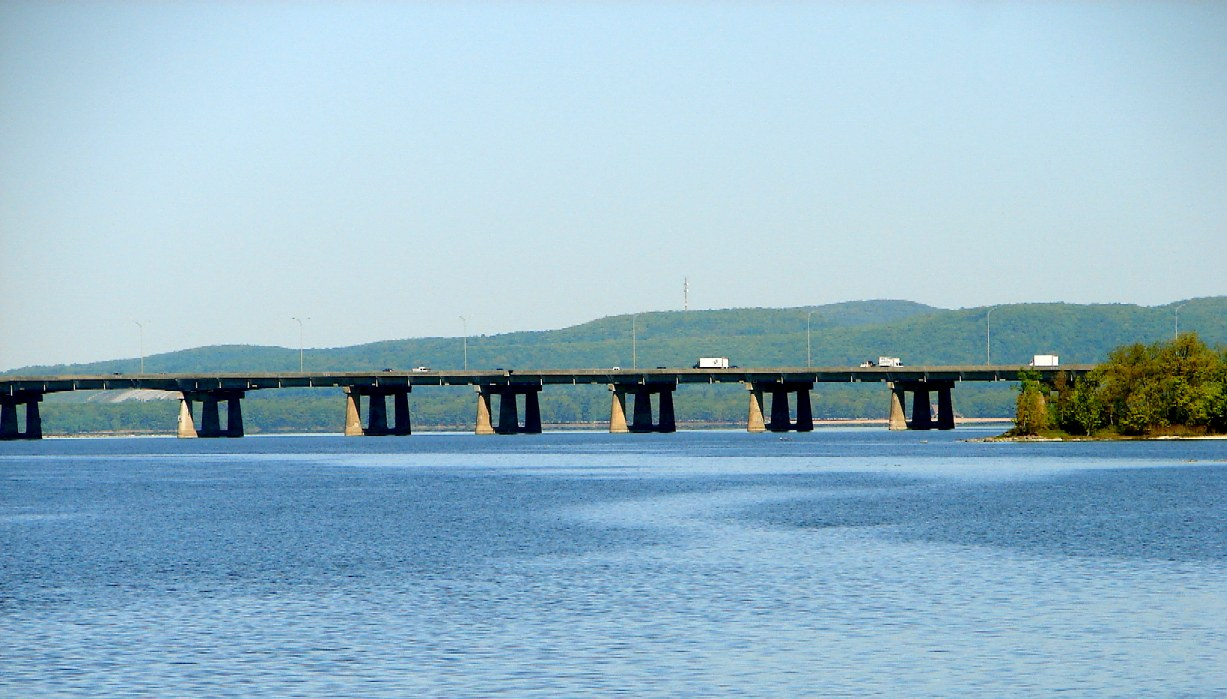
- Coordinates: 45°25′11″N 73°59′32″W
- Carries: A-40 (TCH)
- Crosses: Lake of Two Mountains
- Locale: Vaudreuil, Quebec
- Official name: Pont de l'Île aux Tourtes

Characteristics
- Total length: 2 km (1.2 mi)

History
- Construction end: 1965
- Opened: 1966
- Closed: 2029 (scheduled)

Location
- Interactive map of Île aux Tourtes Bridge

The Île aux Tourtes Bridge is a bridge on the western tip of the Island of Montreal, spanning Lake of Two Mountains between Senneville, and Vaudreuil-Dorion, Quebec, Canada. It carries six lanes of Autoroute 40 and is the main transportation link between Montreal and the province of Ontario. At 2 km in length, it is the longest bridge in Quebec to cross a body of water other than the Saint Lawrence River. It is used by 87,000 vehicles per day, or 3.17 million per year, as a vital artery connecting the island of Montreal to its outer suburbs.

The bridge has been subject to numerous repairs since the 1990s. With an initial projected end-of-life date of 2002, by 2018, the government of Quebec had spent $87 million to maintain the structure with another $45 million expected to be spent by 2028 to reinforce it while a replacement is built. A new $2.3 billion span is scheduled to open in 2026.

== Maintenance and safety concerns ==
The bridge, inaugurated in 1966, suffers from severe structural weaknesses due to its age and the effects of winter weather on its concrete frame despite several waves of repair work taking place in 1991 to 1992, 1994, 2000 to 2001, 2012 to 2013, and 2015 into the present.

Originally given a design life of 35 years, both Quebec's use of de-icing salt for its roadway infrastructure as well as the decision in 2007 to add breakdown lanes to each side of the bridge, thus exceeding its originally conceived weight capacity, have been cited as causes for the premature weathering of the structure. A 2007 inspection on the bridge's integrity reported severe cracks, delaminations, spalling, and leaching both under the span and on its beams and piers.

In November 2009, another inspection by independent engineering firm Genivar identified further deterioration in the structure, including six girders requiring intervention within two years. By November 2011, the girders still had not been replaced. At that time the replacement of the entire structure was reported to be planned for 2020.

Île aux Tourtes Bridge's reputation for its dubious integrity has been compared to previous failures of Quebec infrastructure, including the 2000 Boulevard du Souvenir overpass collapse and the 2006 De la Concorde overpass collapse.

=== Emergency closure in 2021 ===
On May 20, 2021, the government of Quebec announced an indefinite emergency closure of the bridge, after indications that some of the steel reinforcing rods in the bridge support were damaged during routine maintenance work in April. In the interim, the government made travel on the Vaudreuil-Hudson commuter rail line free, and removed tolls from the Quebec Autoroute 30 toll bridge, as alternatives until the Île aux Tourtes Bridge could be safely reopened. The bridge itself was reopened two weeks later on June 2, 2021, sooner than the government had anticipated.

=== Emergency closure in 2023 ===
On November 24, 2023, the Quebec Ministry of Transport again announced the emergency closure of the bridge after a major crack was discovered. On November 27, it was reopened with four lanes closed, leaving only one lane available in each direction indefinitely. On January 15, 2024, a third lane opened on bridge slightly easing the traffic situation. 2 lanes are opened going to Vaudreuil and one lane towards Montreal. As of April 28, 2025 a second lane towards Montreal was reopened bringing the total number to four open lanes easing traffic further.

== See also ==
- List of bridges in Montreal
- List of bridges in Canada
- List of crossings of the Ottawa River
