= Paul-Arthur Séguin =

Canadian politician

Member of the Canadian Parliament for L'Assomption
- In office 1908–1917
- Preceded by: Ruben Charles Laurier
- Succeeded by: District was abolished in 1914

Member of the Canadian Parliament for L'Assomption—Montcalm
- In office 1917–1935
- Preceded by: District was created in 1914
- Succeeded by: District was abolished in 1933

Personal details
- Born: October 2, 1875 Charlemagne, Quebec, Canada
- Died: November 24, 1946 (aged 71)
- Party: Liberal

Paul-Arthur Séguin (October 2, 1875 – November 24, 1946) was a Canadian notary and political figure in Quebec. He represented L'Assomption and then L'Assomption—Montcalm in the House of Commons of Canada from 1908 to 1935 as a Liberal.

He was born in Charlemagne, Quebec, the son of Felix Séguin and Vitaline Noiseux, and was educated at the Collège de L'Assomption and the Université Laval. In 1899, he married Marie Anna Rivest. Séguin was secretary-treasurer for Terrebonne from 1900 to 1907 and was also mayor of L'Assomption.

== Electoral record ==
1908 Canadian federal election: L'Assomption
Party	Candidate	Votes
Liberal	Paul-Arthur Séguin	1,524
Conservative	Joseph Misael Fortier	942

1911 Canadian federal election: L'Assomption
Party	Candidate	Votes
Liberal	Paul-Arthur Séguin	1,508
Conservative	Louis Joseph Siméon Morin	1,209
