= Papineau-Leblanc Bridge =

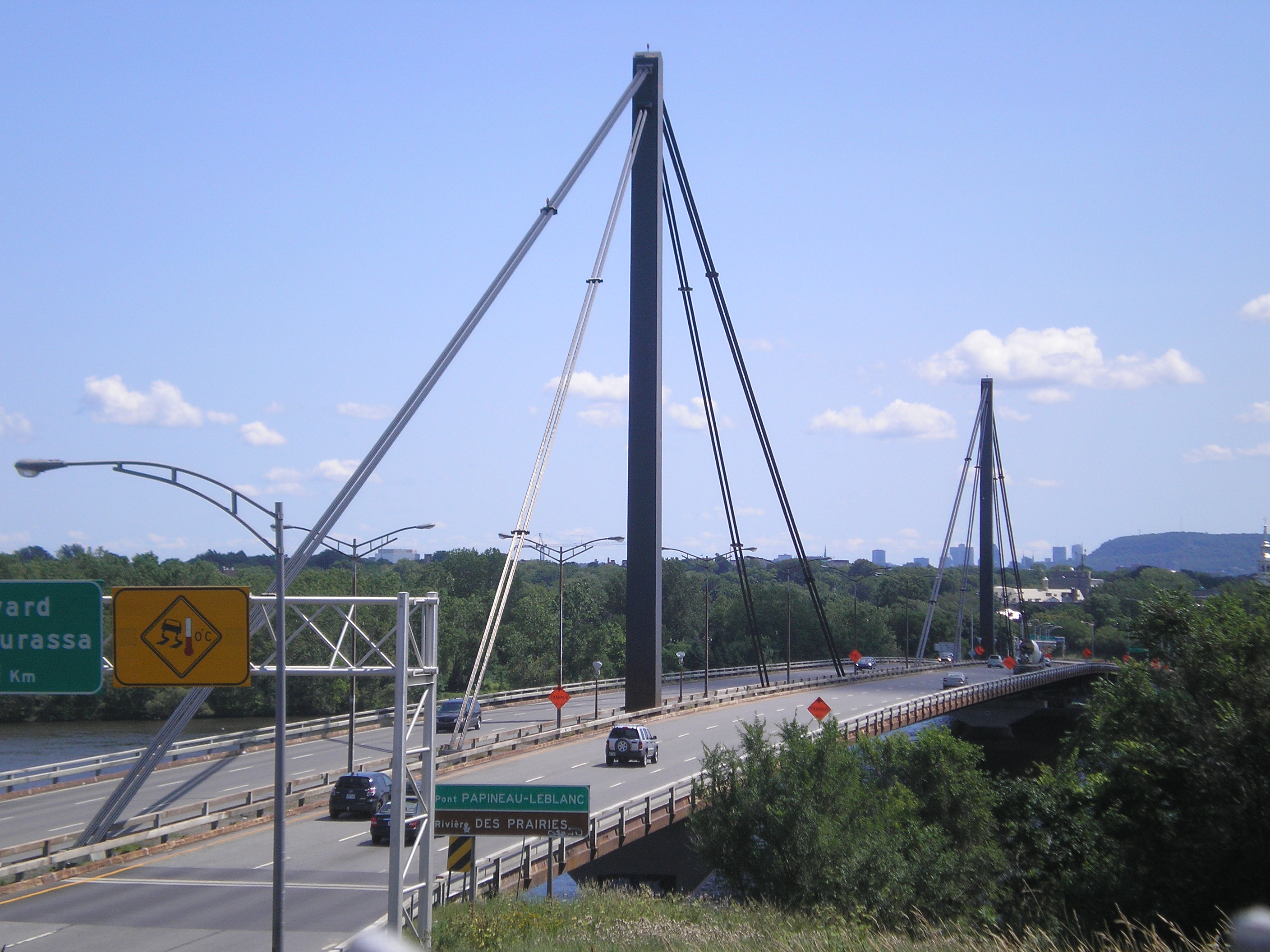
- The Papineau-Leblanc bridge was one of the first cable-stayed bridges in North America.
- Coordinates: 45°34′34″N 73°40′00″W
- Carries: 6 lanes of Autoroute 19
- Crosses: Rivière des Prairies
- Locale: Laval, Quebec and Montreal, Quebec, Canada
- Maintained by: Transports Québec

Characteristics
- Design: Cable-stayed bridge
- Total length: 420.6 m
- Width: 27.2 m
- Longest span: 240 m

History
- Opened: 1969

Statistics
- Daily traffic: 56,000 (2013)

Location
- Interactive map of Papineau-Leblanc Bridge

The Papineau-Leblanc Bridge (French: Pont Papineau-Leblanc) was one of the first cable-stayed spans in North America. It is part of Quebec Autoroute 19 and is one of the connections between Laval and Montreal, Quebec, Canada, spanning Rivière des Prairies. It was fabricated from weathering steel and has an orthotropic deck. The freeway ends abruptly at the southern end of the bridge at the intersection of Henri Bourassa Boulevard, where Autoroute 19 follows Avenue Papineau down to Quebec Autoroute 40.

The Leblanc portion of the name comes from the name of a street in Laval that was expropriated to build the autoroute. That street was named after Alpha Leblanc, a local landowner. Portions of that street remain on both sides of the autoroute.

In 2000, a proposition to rename the bridge after the late Pietro Rizzuto was initially approved, then rejected by the Commission de Toponymie du Québec, which ruled that the name Papineau-Leblanc was already entrenched in local culture and non-controversial. Most locals simply refer to this bridge as Papineau.

== See also ==
- List of bridges spanning the Rivière des Prairies
- List of crossings of the Rivière des Prairies
- List of bridges in Montreal
- List of bridges in Canada
