= Louis Archambeault =

Canadian politician

The Hon. Louis Archambeault
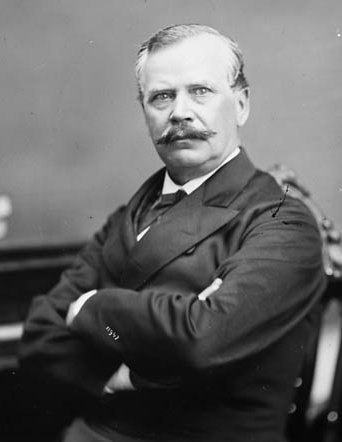

Member of the Canadian Parliament for L'Assomption
- In office 1867–1874
- Succeeded by: Hilaire Hurteau

Member of the Legislative Council of Quebec for Repentigny
- In office 1867–1888
- Succeeded by: Horace Archambeault

Personal details
- Born: November 7, 1814 Longue-Pointe, Lower Canada
- Died: March 3, 1890 (aged 75) L’Assomption, Quebec
- Party: Liberal-Conservative
- Children: Horace Archambeault

Louis Archambeault (French pronunciation: [lwi aʁʃɑ̃bo]; November 7, 1814 – March 3, 1890) was a Quebec politician and notary. He was a Liberal-Conservative Member of Parliament representing L'Assomption from 1867 to 1874.

He was born Louis Archambault at Longue-Pointe (now part of Montreal) in Lower Canada in 1814. He became a notary in 1836 and set up a practice at Saint-Roch-de-l'Achigan, also becoming mayor. He was warden of Leinster County from 1848 to 1853, when the county was split into L'Assomption and Montcalm; he was warden of L'Assomption in 1854 and 1877.

In 1855, he moved to the village of L'Assomption. In the same year, he was accused of having inflated his expenses while serving as a returning officer in two earlier elections. In 1858, he was elected to the Legislative Assembly of the Province of Canada for L'Assomption; he was defeated in 1861 but reelected in 1863. In 1867, he was commissioner of agriculture and public works in the provincial cabinet and he also represented Repentigny in the province's Legislative Council. He introduced measures to encourage settlement and encouraged French-speaking immigrants to settle in the province. He also served in the House of Commons until the practice of serving in both federal and provincial legislatures was made illegal in 1874. He was accused of involvement in the Tanneries scandal of 1874 which led to the fall of the provincial government of the time. From 1877 to 1882, he was mayor of the village of L'Assomption. In 1888, he gave up his seat on the Legislative Council to his son Horace.

Archambeault also helped introduce a provincial board to oversee Quebec notaries. He was president of the Montreal Board of Notaries from 1865 to 1870 and of the provincial board from 1870 to 1876.

He died at L'Assomption in 1890.

== Electoral record ==
1867 Canadian federal election: L'Assomption
Party	Candidate	Votes	Elected
Liberal–Conservative	Louis Archambeault	898	✓
Unknown	Pierre-Urgel Archambault	665	
Source: Canadian Elections Database

1872 Canadian federal election: L'Assomption
Party	Candidate	Votes
Liberal–Conservative	Louis Archambeault	905
Unknown	A. Archambault	757
Source: Canadian Elections Database

== See also ==
- List of presidents of the Saint-Jean-Baptiste Society of Montreal
