= Joseph Gauthier (Quebec MP) =

Canadian politician

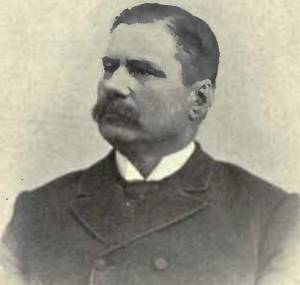

Member of the Canadian Parliament for L'Assomption
- In office 1887–1892
- Preceded by: Hilaire Hurteau
- Succeeded by: Hormidas Jeannotte
- In office 1896–1900
- Preceded by: Hormidas Jeannotte
- Succeeded by: Romuald-Charlemagne Laurier

Personal details
- Born: 1842 Saint-Lin, Canada East
- Died: September 26, 1911 (aged 68–69) Saint-Lin, Quebec, Canada
- Party: Liberal

Joseph Gauthier (French pronunciation: [ʒozɛf ɡotje]; March 11, 1842 – September 26, 1911) was a farmer, grain merchant and political figure in Quebec. He represented L'Assomption in the House of Commons of Canada from 1887 to 1892 and from 1896 to 1900 as a Liberal.

He was born in Saint-Lin, Canada East, the son of Louis Gauthier and Aline Renaud. In 1865, Gauthier married Philomène Daunais. He served as mayor of Saint-Lin from 1872 to 1880. He ran unsuccessfully for a seat in the House of Commons in 1882. He was first elected in 1887; that election was appealed but he won the by-election which followed in 1888. His election in 1891 was declared void in 1892 and Hormidas Jeannotte was elected by acclamation in the by-election that followed. Gauthier defeated Jeannotte in the 1896 federal election. He died in Saint-Lin at the age of 69.

== Election results ==
1882 Canadian federal election: L'Assomption
Party	Candidate	Votes
Liberal–Conservative	Hilaire Hurteau	1,019
Liberal	Joseph Gauthier	852

1887 Canadian federal election: L'Assomption
Party	Candidate	Votes
Liberal	Joseph Gauthier	1,117
Conservative	Barthélémi Rocher	1,096

By-election: On Mr. Gauthier being unseated, 3 March 1888

By-election on 3 April 1888
Party	Candidate	Votes
Liberal	Joseph Gauthier	1,162
Unknown	Barthélémi Rocher	1,075

1891 Canadian federal election: L'Assomption
Party	Candidate	Votes
Liberal	Joseph Gauthier	1,239
Conservative	Hormidas Jeannotte	1,161
