= Horace Archambeault =

Canadian politician (1857–1918)

The Honourable Sir Horace Archambeault
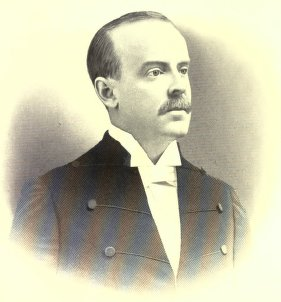

Member of the Legislative Council of Quebec for Repentigny
- In office 1888–1908
- Preceded by: Louis Archambeault
- Succeeded by: Achille Bergevin

Personal details
- Born: March 6, 1857 L'Assomption, Lower Canada
- Died: August 25, 1918 (aged 61) Trois-Pistoles, Quebec, Canada
- Party: Liberal
- Spouse: Élizabeth Lelièvre
- Relations: Louis Archambeault, father

Sir Horace Archambeault (March 6, 1857 – August 25, 1918) was a Canadian politician, judge, and a faculty member in Quebec.

He was born in L'Assomption, Canada East, and studied classics and law. He moved to Montreal and created a law firm with partners. In 1881 he became a professor at Université Laval, eventually becoming the dean of the university's law school. In 1888, Archambeault replaced his father as representative for the division of Repentigny in the Legislative Council of Quebec, becoming its speaker and the attorney general of Quebec in 1897. He was appointed a judge for the Quebec Court of King's Bench in 1908 and became its chief justice in 1911. He was knighted in 1915 and died in Trois-Pistoles in 1918.

== Early life, family, and education ==
Archambeault was born on March 6, 1857, in L'Assomption, Lower Canada. His father was Louis Archambeault and his mother was Marguerite-Élisabeth Dugal.

Archambeault was a student of classical studies at Collège de L'Assomption and Petit Séminaire de Québec. In 1878 he received a degree in law from Université Laval and was called to the bar. He moved to Montreal to begin a career as a lawyer.

== Early career ==
Archambeault joined in a professional partnership with his brother Louis-Henri Archambeault, then formed a firm with Henri-Benjamin Rainville, Honoré Gervais and J.-A Bonnin. In 1881 he became a professor of commercial law and maritime law at the Université Laval's Montreal campus. In 1886 he was given a Doctor of Law because of his professorship at the university, and that year became the faculty's secretary. He was a member of the council of the Montreal bar from 1890 to 1898, and became its vice-president. From 1900 to 1901 he was the bâtonnier of the Montreal bar and the Quebec provincial bar. In 1915 he became the dean of Université Laval's law school.

== Political career ==
Louis Archambeault retired from the Legislative Council of Quebec as representative of Repentigny in 1888 and Horace was invited to replace him. He was originally considered a National Conservative but switched his political allegiance to become a Liberal. In 1897 he was appointed as speaker of the council and Quebec's attorney general. In 1904, he introduced a bill that assigned specific statutes to industrial accidents whereby the employer would be responsible for any worker accidents even if they were not negligent. This bill would become law in 1909.

In 1906, Archambeault declined an appointment to the Supreme Court of Canada but in 1908 he accepted an appointment to the Quebec Court of King's Bench and became its chief justice in 1911. His rulings favoured a strict reading of the text of the law. He maintained a separation of the legislative and judicial branches and thought that they should not interfere with each other, and prevented the use of common law over civil law.

Archambeault was the administrator of the province twice, in order to act for the lieutenant governor: December 1914 – February 1915, and February 1918 – April 1918.

== Honours ==
The governor-general appointed Archambeault as a member of the Queen's Counsel in 1889. He was knighted in 1915.

== Personal life and death ==
Archambeault married Élizabeth Lelièvre in Quebec City at Cathedral-Basilica of Notre-Dame de Québec in 1882. They had no children. Archambeault was Roman Catholic. He died on August 25, 1918, in Trois-Pistoles, Quebec. He was buried in the Notre Dame des Neiges Cemetery.
