= Saint-Lin–Laurentides =

- City
- Ville de Saint-Lin–Laurentides
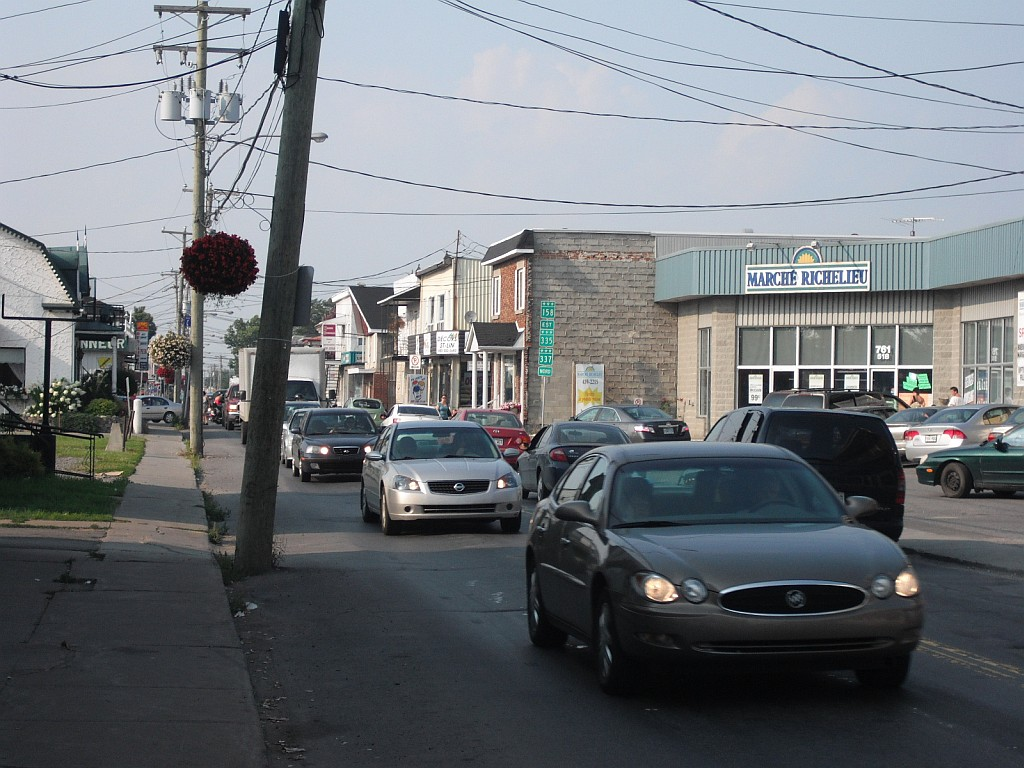
- Route 335

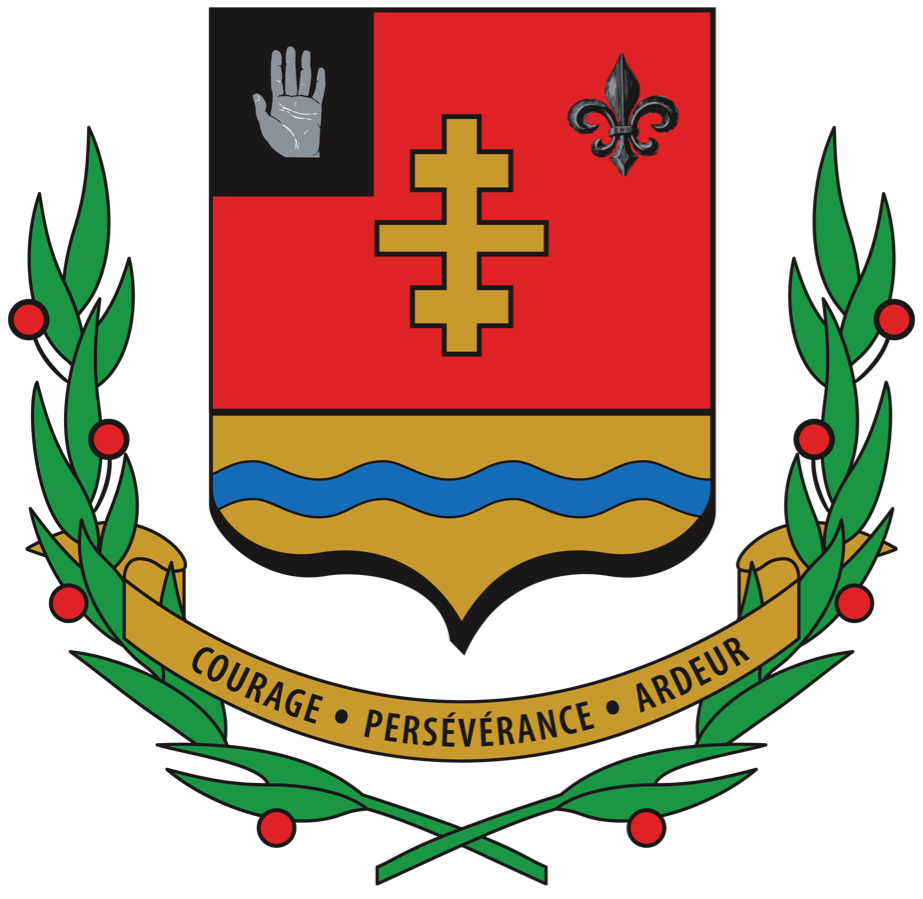
- Coat of arms

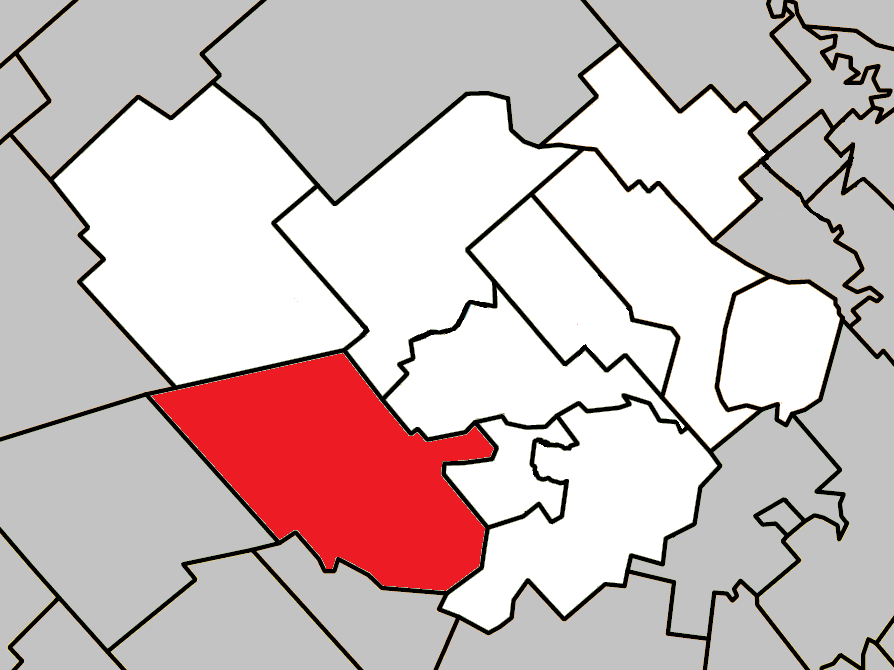
- Location within Montcalm RCM

- Location in central Quebec
- Coordinates: 45°51′N 73°46′W
- Country: Canada
- Province: Quebec
- Region: Lanaudière
- RCM: Montcalm
- Settled: 1807
- Constituted: March 1, 2000

Government
  - Mayor: Isabelle Auger
  - Fed. riding: Montcalm
  - Prov. riding: Rousseau

Area
  - Total: 118.69 km^{2} (45.83 sq mi)
  - Land: 118.29 km^{2} (45.67 sq mi)
  - Urban: 17.29 km^{2} (6.68 sq mi)

Population (2021)
  - Total: 24,030
  - Density: 203.2/km^{2} (526/sq mi)
  - Urban: 19,963
  - Urban density: 1,154.6/km^{2} (2,990/sq mi)
  - Pop (2016-21): ▲15.6%
  - Dwellings: 9,615
- Time zone: UTC−5 (EST)
  - Summer (DST): UTC−4 (EDT)
- Postal code(s): J5M
- Area codes: 450, 579
- Highways: R-158; R-335; R-337
- Website: www.saint-lin-laurentides.com

Saint-Lin–Laurentides (French pronunciation: [sɛ̃ lɛ̃ lɔʁɑ̃tid]) is a small city located in the Montcalm Regional County Municipality of Quebec, Canada. Its official name uses an en dash; however, the city's own website and Statistics Canada uses the two-hyphen version of its name: Saint-Lin--Laurentides. In the 2021 Canadian census, its population was 24,030.

Saint-Lin was the birthplace of former Canadian Prime Minister Wilfrid Laurier, whose paternal home is now a National Historic Site of Canada.

== History ==
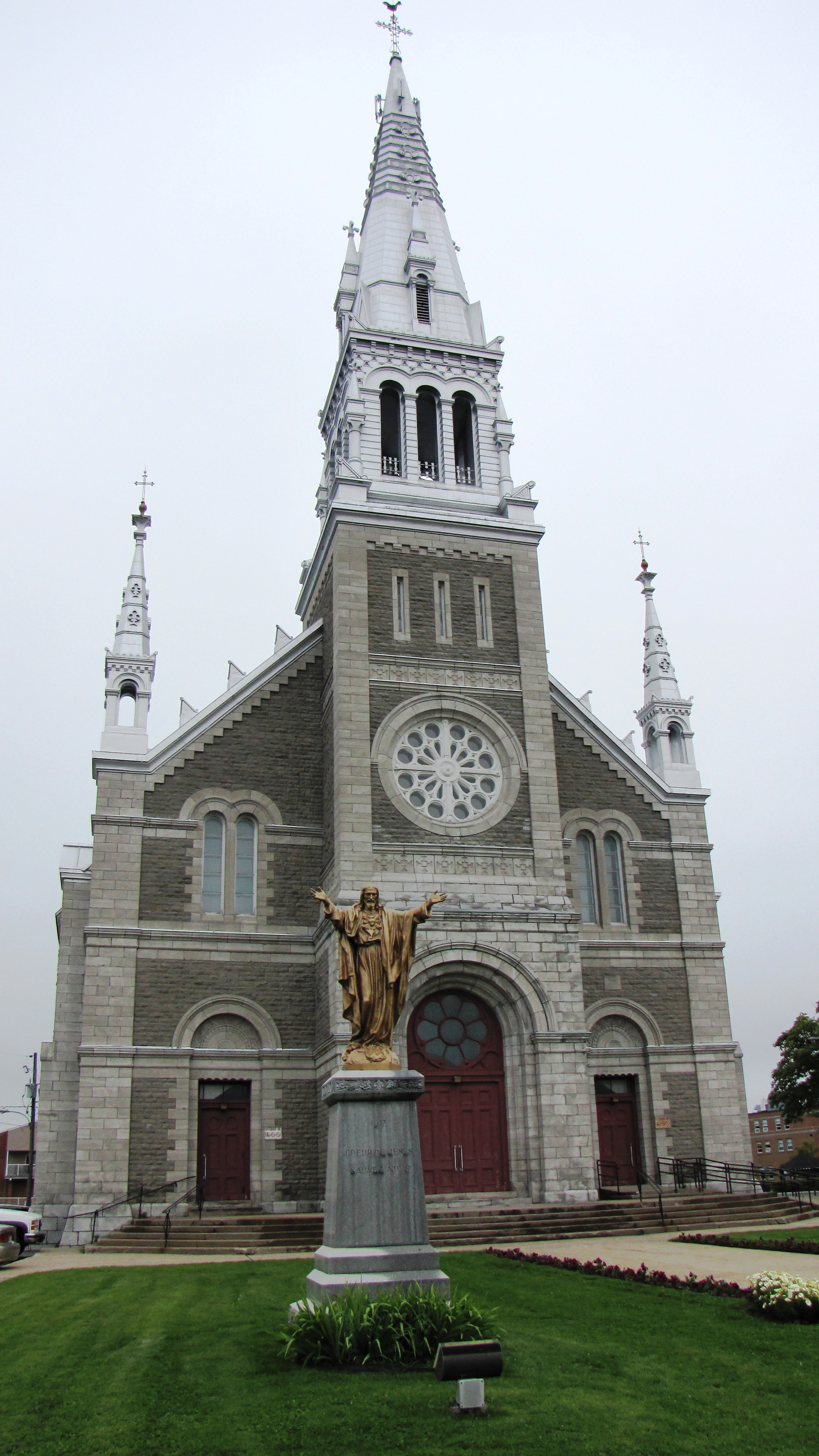
Church of St-Lin, 2009

Saint-Lin–Laurentides was formed on 1 March 2000, when the Municipality of Saint-Lin and the Town of Laurentides were merged.

Saint-Lin was first settled in 1807 when pioneers from Saint-Pierre-du-Portage (now L'Assomption) arrived. In 1828, the Saint-Lin-de-Lachenaie Parish was founded. In 1845, the Parish Municipality of Saint-Lin was established, but was abolished two years later in 1847 when it was absorbed into the county municipality. That same year, its post office opened. In 1855, the municipality was reestablished as Saint-Lin-de-Lachenaye, with Carolus Laurier, father of Sir Wilfrid Laurier, as first mayor.

Laurentides was originally the Village Municipality of Saint-Lin, which became an incorporate entity in 1856. In 1883, it changed name and statutes and became the Town of Laurentides. Also that year, the local post office opened.

== Geography ==
The Achigan River flows through the north-western tip of the municipality from north-east to south-west and then crosses the municipality from west to east. The Beauport River, coming from the northeast, joins the Achigan River at the northwestern boundary of the municipality. The Petite Rivière, which flows southwest, crosses the northeastern part of the municipality until it joins the Achigan River west of the town centre.

== Demographics ==
In the 2021 Census of Population conducted by Statistics Canada, Saint-Lin—Laurentides had a population of 24,030 living in 9,289 of its 9,615 total private dwellings, a change of 15.6% from its 2016 population of 20,786. With a land area of 118.29 km^{2} (45.67 sq mi), it had a population density of 203.1/km^{2} (526.1/sq mi) in 2021.

Canada census – Saint-Lin-Laurentides community profile

| | 2021 | 2016 | 2011 |
| Population | 24,030 (+15.6% from 2016) | 20,786 (+19.0% from 2011) | 17,463 (+23.3% from 2006) |
| Land area | 118.29 km^{2} (45.67 sq mi) | 118.36 km^{2} (45.70 sq mi) | 118.52 km^{2} (45.76 sq mi) |
| Population density | 203.2/km^{2} (526/sq mi) | 175.6/km^{2} (455/sq mi) | 147.3/km^{2} (382/sq mi) |
| Median age | 34.8 (M: 34.8, F: 34.4) | 35.2 (M: 35.4, F: 35.0) | 35.9 (M: 35.8, F: 36.0) |
| Private dwellings | 9,615 (total) 9,289 (occupied) | 8,376 (total) | 6,972 (total) |
| Median household income | $78,500 | $61,578 | $56,064 |

References: 2021 2016 2011

Historical census populations – Saint-Lin–Laurentides
| Year | Pop. | ±% |
|---|---|---|
| 2001 | 12,379 | — |
| 2006 | 14,159 | +14.4% |
| 2011 | 17,463 | +23.3% |
| 2016 | 20,786 | +19.0% |
| 2021 | 24,030 | +15.6% |
Source: Statistics Canada

Canada Census Mother Tongue – Saint-Lin-Laurentides, Quebec
| Census | Total | French | | | English | | | French & English | | | Other | | |
| Year | Responses | Count | Trend | Pop % | Count | Trend | Pop % | Count | Trend | Pop % | Count | Trend | Pop % |
| 2021 | 23,925 | 22,545 | ▲13.9% | 94.2% | 370 | ▲29.8% | 1.5% | 265 | ▲120.8% | 1.1% | 605 | ▲55.1% | 2.5% |
| 2016 | 20,645 | 19,790 | ▲18.8% | 95.9% | 285 | ▲11.8% | 1.4% | 120 | ▲4.3% | 0.6% | 390 | ▲69.6% | 1.9% |
| 2011 | 17,310 | 16,660 | ▲22.6% | 96.2% | 255 | ▲24.4% | 1.5% | 115 | ▲109.1% | 0.7% | 230 | ▲31.4% | 1.3% |
| 2006 | 14,025 | 13,590 | ▲13.5% | 96.9% | 205 | ▲46.4% | 1.5% | 55 | ▲10.0% | 0.4% | 175 | ▲150.0% | 1.2% |
| 2001 | 12,240 | 11,975 | n/a | 97.8% | 140 | n/a | 1.1% | 50 | n/a | 0.4% | 70 | n/a | 0.6% |

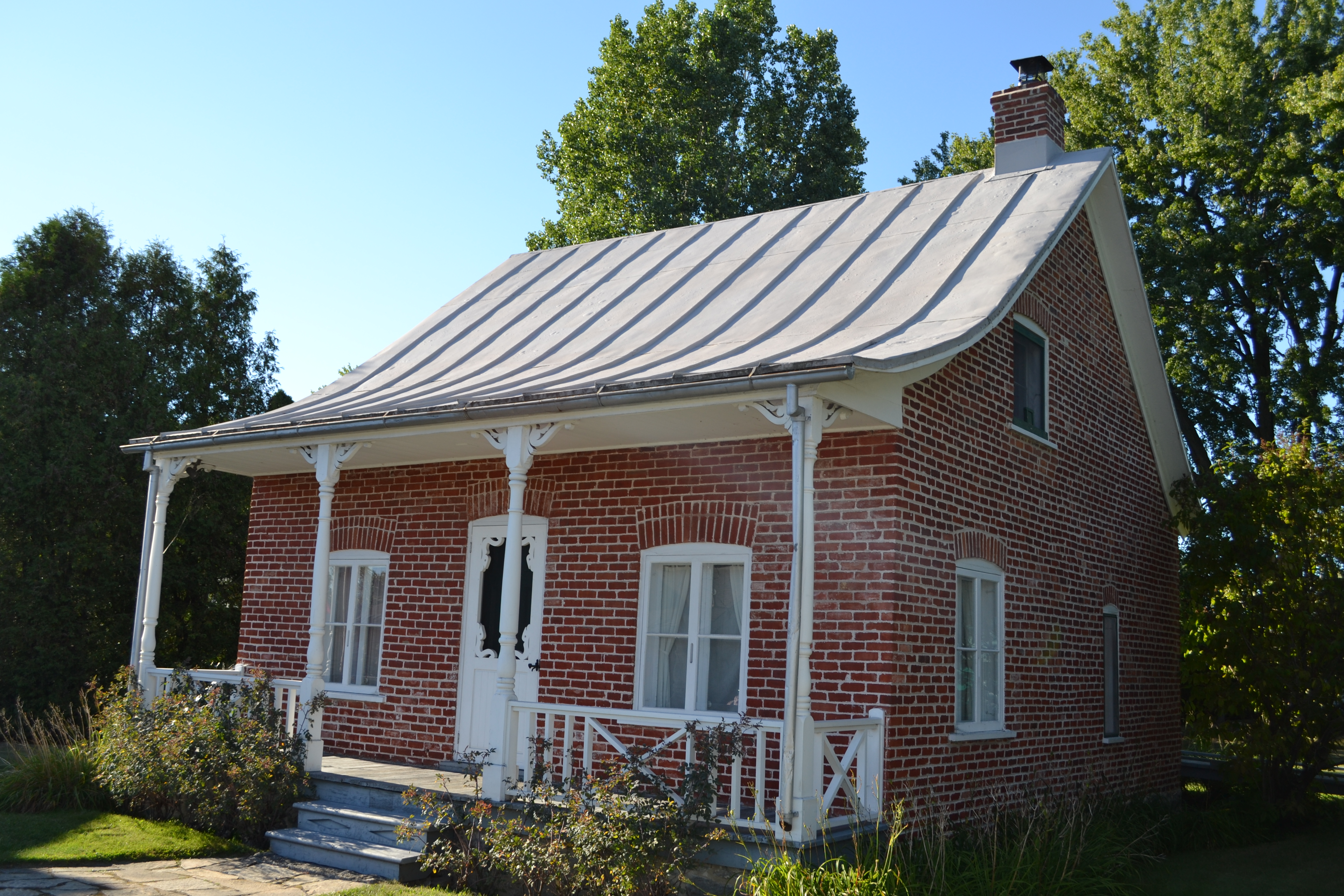
Home of Sir Wilfrid Laurier

== Government ==
List of former mayors:

- André Auger (...–2013)
- Patrick Massé (2013–2021)
- Mathieu Maisonneuve (2021–present)

== Education ==
The Commission scolaire des Samares operates francophone public schools

- École de l'Aubier
- École des Trois-Temps
  - pavillon de l'Arc-en-Ciel
  - pavillon de l'Oiseau-Bleu
  - pavillon Sir-Wilfrid-Laurier
- École du ruisseau

Sir Wilfrid Laurier School Board operates English-language public schools. Schools serving the town:

- Joliette Elementary School in Saint-Charles-Borromée serves most of the town
- Laurentia Elementary School in Saint-Jérôme serves a portion of the town
- Joliette High School in Joliette serves all of the town

== Notable people ==
- Gabrielle Destroismaisons, singer
- Joseph Gauthier, politician
- Élise Guilbault, actress
- Hilaire Hurteau, politician
- Romuald-Charlemagne Laurier, politician
- Wilfrid Laurier, seventh prime minister of Canada
- Maurice Lebel, academic
