= Hilaire Hurteau =

Canadian politician

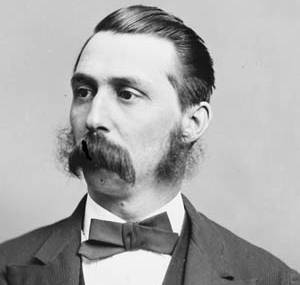
- Hilaire Hurteau; Source: Library and Archives Canada

Member of the Canadian Parliament for L'Assomption
- In office 1874–1887
- Preceded by: Louis Archambeault
- Succeeded by: Joseph Gauthier

Personal details
- Born: May 4, 1837 Contrecoeur, Lower Canada
- Died: February 10, 1920 (aged 82)
- Party: Liberal-Conservative

Hilaire Hurteau (French pronunciation: [ilɛʁ yʁto]; May 4, 1837 – February 10, 1920) was a notary and political figure in Quebec. He represented L'Assomption in the House of Commons of Canada from 1874 to 1887 as a Liberal-Conservative member.

He was born in Contrecoeur, Lower Canada and educated at L'Assomption College. He studied law with notary Isidore Hurteau in Longueuil, later qualifying to practice as a notary.

In 1859, he married Delphine Beaudoin.

Hurteau served three years as mayor of St-Lin and three years as warden for the county. He also served as secretary-treasurer of schools. Hurteau was vice-president of the Laurentian Railway Company. His election in 1874 was overturned after an appeal but he won the subsequent by-election in 1875 by acclamation.

== Electoral record ==
1874 Canadian federal election: L'Assomption
| Party | Candidate | Votes |
|---|---|---|
| Liberal–Conservative | Hilaire Hurteau | 879 |
| Unknown | L. Forrest | 818 |

By-election: On Mr. Hurteau being unseated on petition, 24 November 1874

By-election on 16 January 1875
| Party | Candidate | Votes |
| Liberal–Conservative | Hilaire Hurteau | acclaimed |

1878 Canadian federal election: L'Assomption
| Party | Candidate | Votes |
|---|---|---|
| Liberal–Conservative | Hilaire Hurteau | 1,021 |
| Unknown | L. Forest | 852 |

1882 Canadian federal election: L'Assomption
| Party | Candidate | Votes |
|---|---|---|
| Liberal–Conservative | Hilaire Hurteau | 1,019 |
| Liberal | Joseph Gauthier | 852 |
