= Pierre-Urgel Archambault =

Canadian politician and businessman

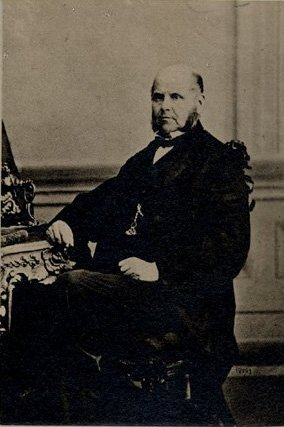

Member of the Legislative Council of the Province of Canada for Repentigny
- In office 1858–1867

Personal details
- Born: January 11, 1812 L'Assomption, Lower Canada
- Died: August 19, 1871 (aged 59) L'Assomption, Quebec

Pierre-Urgel Archambault (January 11, 1812 – August 19, 1871) was a Quebec politician and businessman.

He was born in L'Assomption, Lower Canada in 1812 and studied at the Petit Séminaire de Montréal. In 1835, he married Joséphine, the daughter of Benjamin Beaupré. He was mayor of L'Assomption from 1847 to 1854. He served in the local militia becoming lieutenant-colonel. In 1858, he was elected to the Legislative Council of the Province of Canada for Repentigny division and served until Confederation. Archambault was president of the Société d’Agriculture of L’Assomption and helped establish the École d’Agriculture de L’Assomption, an agricultural school. In 1867, he ran unsuccessfully in L'Assomption for a seat in the House of Commons.

He died at L'Assomption in 1871.

His brother Alexandre also served as mayor of L’Assomption and as a member of the legislative assembly. His daughter Athala married Ludger Forest, who later represented L'Assomption in the Quebec legislative assembly. His daughter Louise-Georgiana married Louis-Olivier Taillon, who later became premier of Quebec.

1867 Canadian federal election: L'Assomption
Party	Candidate	Votes	Elected
Liberal–Conservative	Louis Archambeault	898	✓
Unknown	Pierre-Urgel Archambault	665	
Source: Canadian Elections Database
