= L'Assomption (federal electoral district) =

Former federal electoral district in Quebec, Canada

Quebec electoral district

Defunct federal electoral district
- Legislature: House of Commons
- District created: 1867
- District abolished: 1914
- First contested: 1867
- Last contested: 1911

L'Assomption (French pronunciation: [lasɔ̃psjɔ̃]) was a federal electoral district in Quebec, Canada, that was represented in the House of Commons of Canada from 1867 to 1917.

It was created by the British North America Act, 1867. It was amalgamated into the L'Assomption—Montcalm electoral district in 1914.

== Members of Parliament ==
This riding elected the following members of Parliament:

Parliament	Years	Member	Party
L'Assomption
1st	1867–1872	Louis Archambeault	Liberal–Conservative
2nd	1872–1874	Louis Archambeault	Liberal–Conservative
3rd	1874–1874	Hilaire Hurteau	Liberal–Conservative
3rd	1875–1878	Hilaire Hurteau	Liberal–Conservative
4th	1878–1882	Hilaire Hurteau	Liberal–Conservative
5th	1882–1887	Hilaire Hurteau	Liberal–Conservative
6th	1887–1888	Joseph Gauthier	Liberal
6th	1888–1891	Joseph Gauthier	Liberal
7th	1891–1892	Joseph Gauthier	Liberal
7th	1892–1896	Hormidas Jeannotte	Conservative
8th	1896–1900	Joseph Gauthier	Liberal
9th	1900–1904	Romuald-Charlemagne Laurier	Liberal
10th	1904–1906	Romuald-Charlemagne Laurier	Liberal
10th	1907–1908	Ruben Charles Laurier	Liberal
11th	1908–1911	Paul-Arthur Séguin	Liberal
12th	1911–1917	Paul-Arthur Séguin	Liberal
Riding dissolved into L'Assomption—Montcalm

== Election results ==
1867 Canadian federal election
Party	Candidate	Votes	Elected
Liberal–Conservative	Louis Archambeault	898	✓
Unknown	Pierre-Urgel Archambault	665	
Source: Canadian Elections Database

1872 Canadian federal election
Party	Candidate	Votes
Liberal–Conservative	Louis Archambeault	905
Unknown	A. Archambault	757
Source: Canadian Elections Database

1874 Canadian federal election
Party	Candidate	Votes
Liberal–Conservative	Hilaire Hurteau	879
Unknown	L. Forrest	818

By-election: On Mr. Hurteau being unseated on petition, 24 November 1874

By-election on 16 January 1875
Party	Candidate	Votes
Liberal–Conservative	Hilaire Hurteau	acclaimed

1878 Canadian federal election
Party	Candidate	Votes
Liberal–Conservative	Hilaire Hurteau	1,021
Unknown	L. Forest	852

1882 Canadian federal election
Party	Candidate	Votes
Liberal–Conservative	Hilaire Hurteau	1,019
Liberal	Joseph Gauthier	852

1887 Canadian federal election
Party	Candidate	Votes
Liberal	Joseph Gauthier	1,117
Conservative	Barthélémi Rocher	1,096

By-election: On Mr. Gauthier being unseated, 3 March 1888

By-election on 3 April 1888
Party	Candidate	Votes
Liberal	Joseph Gauthier	1,162
Unknown	Barthélémi Rocher	1,075

1891 Canadian federal election
Party	Candidate	Votes
Liberal	Joseph Gauthier	1,239
Conservative	Hormidas Jeannotte	1,161

By-election: On election being declared void, 6 February 1892

By-election on 31 May 1892
Party	Candidate	Votes
Conservative	Hormidas Jeannotte	acclaimed

1896 Canadian federal election
Party	Candidate	Votes
Liberal	Joseph Gauthier	1,335
Conservative	Hormidas Jeannotte	1,216

1900 Canadian federal election
Party	Candidate	Votes
Liberal	Romuald-Charlemagne Laurier	1,486
Conservative	Horace Honoré Éthier	1,138

1904 Canadian federal election
Party	Candidate	Votes
Liberal	Romuald-Charlemagne Laurier	acclaimed

By-election: On Mr. Laurier's death, 28 December 1906

By-election on 7 March 1907
Party	Candidate	Votes
Liberal	Ruben Charles Laurier	1,276
Conservative	E. Lemire dit Marsolais	1,106

1908 Canadian federal election
Party	Candidate	Votes
Liberal	Paul-Arthur Séguin	1,524
Conservative	Joseph Misael Fortier	942

1911 Canadian federal election
Party	Candidate	Votes
Liberal	Paul-Arthur Séguin	1,508
Conservative	Louis Joseph Siméon Morin	1,209

== See also ==
- List of Canadian electoral districts
- Historical federal electoral districts of Canada
