= Quebec Autoroute 440 (Laval) =

Highway in Laval, Quebec

Autoroute 440
- Autoroute Jean-Noël-Lavoie
- A-440 highlighted in red

Route information
- Maintained by Transports Québec
- Length: 18.2 km (11.3 mi)
- Existed: 1974–present

Major junctions
- West end: A-13 / R-148 in Laval
- A-15 (TCH) / A-19 in Laval
- East end: A-25 in Laval

Location
- Country: Canada
- Province: Quebec
- Major cities: Laval

Highway system
- Quebec provincial highways; Autoroutes; List; Former
← A-410	→ A-440

Autoroute 440 (or A-440, also known as Autoroute Jean-Noël-Lavoie and previously as Autoroute Laval) is a provincial highway that runs across the city of Laval, Quebec from Autoroute 13 to Autoroute 25. It is currently 18.2 km (11.3 mi) long and proceeds across Île Jésus on an east–west axis. It links every highway or expressway that connects Montreal to the North Shore.

Originally, it was supposed to have continued west in the Avenue des Bois corridor and crossed Rivière des Prairies on Bigras and Bizard Islands. On the latter island, the right-of-way is actually a public park. On the Island of Montreal, the A-440 right-of-way is just west of Boulevard Château-Pierrefonds. The autoroute would have ended at the Chemin Sainte-Marie interchange (Exit 49), on Autoroute 40.

== History ==
A-440 was built over the following timeline:

From	Exit	To	Exit	Date
Route 117	19	A-15/TCH	22	1974
A-13	17	Route 117	19	1975
A-15/TCH	22	Route 335	25	1975
Route 335	25	A-19	27	1976
A-19	27	A-25 South (now Route 125 South)	34	1979
Route 125 South, (former A-25 South)	34	New A-25 South (existing autoroute renumbered)	16 (A-25)	2011

Note: Only service roads were originally built from A-13 to Boulevard Industriel (Exit 24), but they were signed as Autoroute 440 until the autoroute was completed in 1994.

== Exit list ==
The entire route is in Laval. The exit numbers do not correspond with the km marker because the highway is never fully completed.

km	mi	Exit	Destinations	Notes
0.00	0.00	–	R-148 west (Avenue des Bois) / Montée Champagne	At-grade intersection
1.00	0.62	17	A-13 (Autoroute Chomedey) – Montreal, Saint-Eustache, Aéroport P.-E.-Trudeau, Aéroport Mirabel	Split into exits 17S (south) and 17N (north) west bound; exit 15 on A-13; no exit number eastbound
4.30	2.67	19	R-117 (Boulevard Curé-Labelle) / Boulevard Chomedey	
6.20	3.85	22	A-15 (TCH) (Autoroute des Laurentides) – Saint-Jérôme, Montréal, Aéroport Mirabel	Exit 15 on A-15
7.70	4.78	24	Boulevard Industriel	
9.90	6.15	25	R-335 south (Boulevard des Laurentides) / Boulevard René-Laennec	R-335 joins service roads
11.50	7.15	27	A-19 (Autoroute Papineau) / R-335 north (Boulevard des Filion) – Montréal	R-335 leaves service roads; exit 8 on A-19 / Route 335
14.20	8.82	30	R-125 south (Boulevard Pie-IX) / Pont Pie-IX – Montréal	Western terminus of concurrency with R-125
15.60	9.69	31	Montée Saint-François	Eastbound exit is via exit 30
18.20	11.31	34	R-125 north (Montée Masson) / Rang du Bas-Saint-François / Avenue Marcel Villeneuve	Exit formerly served A-25
18.70	11.62	35	A-25 south – Montréal	To Pont Olivier Charbonneau
19.80	12.30	–	A-25 north – Terrebonne	Exit 17 on A-25
1.000 mi = 1.609 km; 1.000 km = 0.621 mi: Concurrency terminus; Incomplete access; Tolled
