= Quebec Route 335 =

Highway in Quebec

Coordinates: 45.91266°N 73.78045°W

Route 335

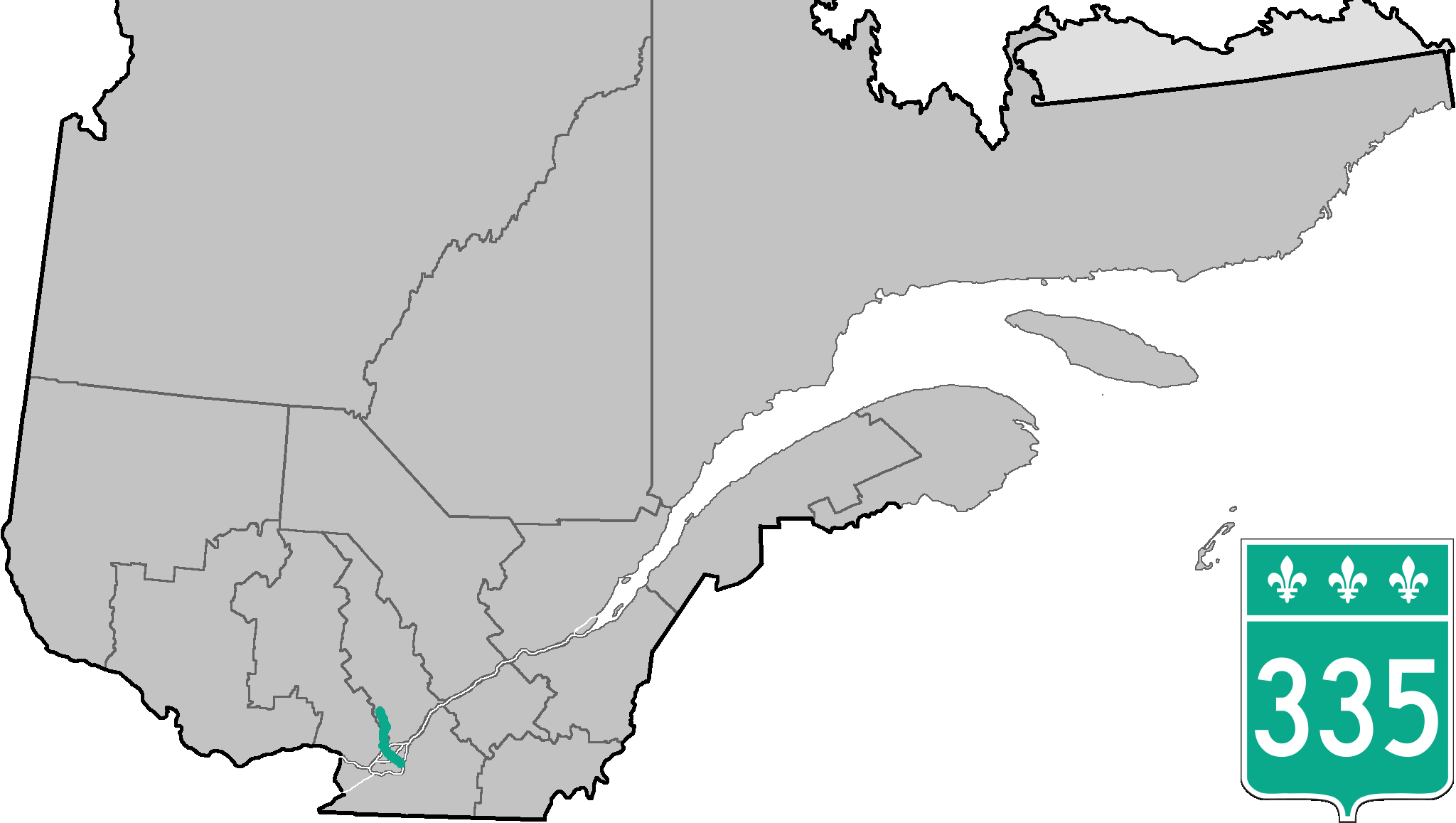

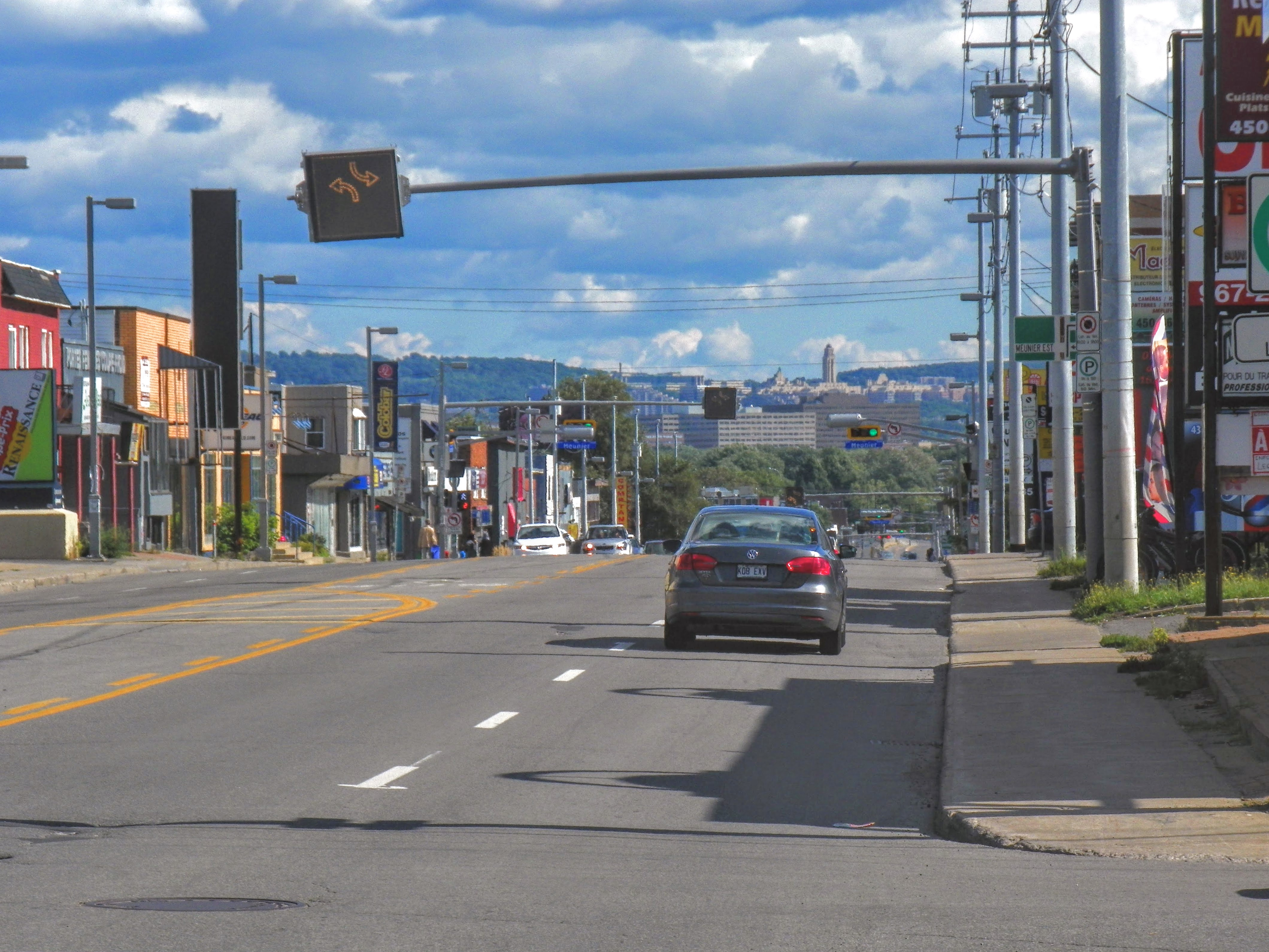
- Route 335 south as Laurentides boulevard in Pont-Viau, Laval.

Route information
- Maintained by Transports Québec
- Length: 85.5 km (53.1 mi)
- History: Route 65

Major junctions
- South end: R-138 in Montréal
- A-40 (TCH) in Montréal; A-19 / A-440 in Laval; A-640 in Bois-des-Filion; R-158 in Saint-Lin-Laurentides
- North end: R-125 in Chertsey

Location
- Country: Canada
- Province: Quebec
- Major cities: Montreal, Laval, Terrebonne

Highway system
- Quebec provincial highways; Autoroutes; List; Former
← R-333	→ R-337

Route 335 is a north-south regional route located on the north shore of the St. Lawrence River. from Montreal It serves the administrative regions of Montreal, Laval, Laurentides, and Lanaudière. It is the only secondary route to cross the Island of Montreal. Between Autoroute 440 in Laval and chemin de la Côte-St-Louis in Terrebonne, Route 335 is located in the right-of-way of the future Autoroute 19.

== Route description ==
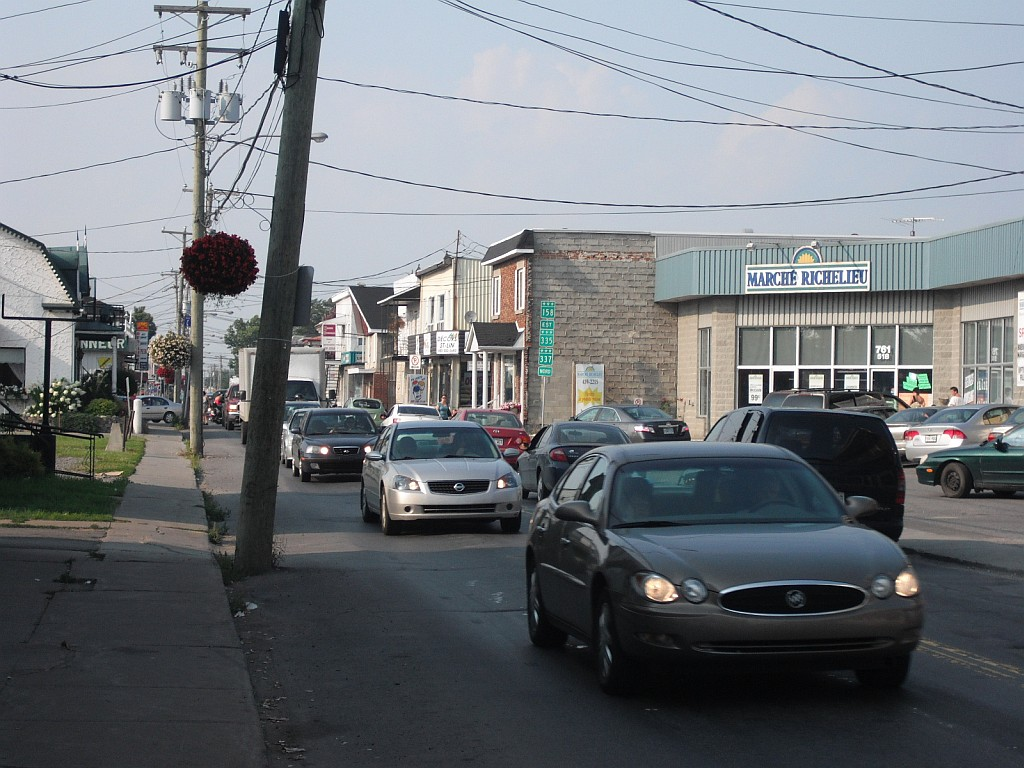
Route 335 in Saint-Lin-Laurentides, multiplexed with 158 and 337.

Route 335 begins in Montreal at Sherbrooke Street (Route 138) and follows Saint Denis Street. North of the Autoroute 40, it splits to a one-way pair and follows Berri Street southbound and Lajeunesse Street northbound. It then rejoins when it crosses the Pont-Viau over Rivière des Prairies to Laval. It follows boulevard des Laurentides to the Autoroute 440 interchange.

Route 335 once followed the entire length of Laurentian Boulevard to the David Bridge on the Rivière des Mille Îles but is now concurrent with Autoroute 440 for about 1.5 km (0.9 mi) to Autoroute 19. Between Autoroute 440 and Dagenais Boulevard, it is concurrent with Autoroute 19 to its end and then continues on the Autoroute 19 right-of-way. North of the bridge, Route 335 once ran along montée Gagnon from Route 344 northwards, but it now follows the Autoroute 19 right-of-way along boulevard Louis-Joseph-Papineau to chemin de la Côte-St-Louis est, north of which it runs along montée Gagnon and its historic route.

Formerly Route 65, it was an alternative to Routes 11 and 18.

== Future ==
There are plans to extend Autoroute 19 along Route 335 to Autoroute 640 in Bois-des-Filion with anticipated completion in 2027, with the first phase being 1.5 km (0.9 mi) extension and an interchange at rue Saint-Saëns. The project includes four new interchanges, the reconstruction of the Autoroute 640 interchange, and the twinning of Athanase David Bridge.

== Municipalities along Route 335 ==
- Montreal (Le Plateau-Mont-Royal / Rosemont–La Petite-Patrie / Villeray–Saint-Michel–Parc-Extension / Ahuntsic-Cartierville)
- Laval (Pont-Viau / Vimont / Auteuil)
- Bois-des-Filion
- Terrebonne
- Sainte-Anne-des-Plaines
- Terrebonne (La Plaine)
- Saint-Lin-Laurentides
- Saint-Calixte
- Chertsey

== Major intersections ==
RCM	Location	km	mi	Exit	Destinations	Notes
Montréal	Montréal	0.0	0.0		Rue Saint Denis Rue Sherbrooke (R-138)	R-335 southern terminus; Rue Saint Denis continues south
Montréal	Montréal	6.4	4.0		A-40 (TCH) (Autoroute Métropolitaine)	Access via Boulevard Crémazie service roads; A-40 exits 71 (eastbound) and 73 (westbound); one-way transition, northbound follows Rue Lajeunesse, southbound follows Rue Berri
Montréal	Montréal	9.5	5.9		One-way transition	North end of one-way pair; becomes Boulevard des Laurentides
Rivière des Prairies		9.5– 9.9	5.9– 6.2	Pont Viau (Viau Bridge)		
Laval		13.3	8.3		Boulevard Saint-Martin	Former R-148
Laval		14.8	9.2	25	A-440 west (Autoroute Jean-Noël-Lavoie) / Boulevard des Laurentides	A-440 exit 25; south end of A-40 concurrency; exit numbers follow A-440
Laval		15.7	9.8	25; 27	Boulevard René-Laennec	Signed as exits 25 (eastbound) and 27 (westbound)
Laval		16.8	10.4	27 8	A-19 south (Autoroute Papineau) – Montréal A-440 east (Autoroute Jean-Noël-Lavoie)	North end of A-440 concurrency; south end of A-19 concurrency; A-440 exit 27; A-19 exit 8
Laval		18.5	11.5		A-19 ends / Boulevard Dagenais Est / Boulevard des Grands-Maîtres	At-grade; A-19 northern terminus; becomes Avenue Papineau; future interchange as part of A-19 extension
Laval		21.9	13.6		Rue Saint-Saëns Est	Future interchange as part of A-19 extension
Laval		23.7	14.7		Boulevard des Laurentides / Boulevard des Mille-Îles	Future interchange as part of A-19 extension
Rivière des Mille Îles		24.3– 24.6	15.1– 15.3	Athanase David Bridge		
Thérèse-De Blainville	Bois-des-Filion	25.1	15.6		R-344 (Boulevard Adolphe-Chapleau) – Rosemère, Terrebonne	Future interchange as part of A-19 extension
Thérèse-De Blainville	Bois-des-Filion	26.0	16.2		A-640 – Repentigny, Saint-Eustache	A-640 exit 28; future A-19 northern terminus
Les Moulins – Thérèse-De Blainville boundary	Terrebonne – Blainville boundary	31.1	19.3		Montée Gagnon / Chemin de la Côte-Saint-Louis	
Les Moulins	No major junctions					
Thérèse-De Blainville	No major junctions					
Les Moulins	Terrebonne (La Plaine)	45.3	28.1		R-337 south – Terrebonne	South end of R-337 concurrency
Montcalm	Saint-Lin-Laurentides	52.1	32.4		R-158 west / R-339 south – Saint-Jérôme, Saint-Roch-Ouest	South end of R-158 concurrency; R-339 northern terminus
Montcalm	Saint-Lin-Laurentides	53.8	33.4		R-158 east – Saint-Esprit	North end of R-158 concurrency
Montcalm	Saint-Lin-Laurentides	57.0	35.4		R-337 north – Sainte-Julienne	North end of R-337 concurrency
Montcalm	Saint-Calixte	74.9	46.5		Chemin du Lac de l'Achigan – Saint-Hippolyte	To R-333
Montcalm	Chertsey – Rawdon boundary	85.5	53.1		R-125 – Rawdon, Saint-Donat	
1.000 mi = 1.609 km; 1.000 km = 0.621 mi: Concurrency terminus; Unopened

== See also ==
- List of Quebec provincial highways
- Pont Viau
