= Hormidas Jeannotte =

Canadian politician (1843–1909)

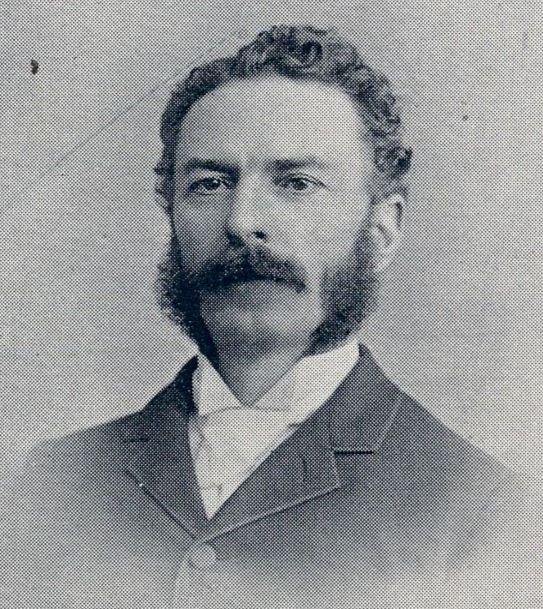

Member of the Canadian Parliament for L'Assomption
- In office 1892–1896
- Preceded by: Joseph Gauthier
- Succeeded by: Joseph Gauthier

Personal details
- Born: 22 December 1843 St-Henri de Mascouche, Canada East
- Died: 29 April 1909 (aged 65)
- Party: Conservative

Hormidas Jeannotte (22 December 1843 – 29 April 1909) was a notary and political figure in Quebec. He represented L'Assomption in the House of Commons of Canada from 1892 to 1896 as a Conservative member.

He was born in St-Henri de Mascouche, Canada East. He served as a member of the municipal council for Montreal from 1878 to 1894. Jeannotte was defeated by Joseph Gauthier in the 1891 federal election but won the 1892 by-election held after the results of that election were overturned. He was defeated by Gauthier when he ran for reelection in 1896.
