= L'Assomption—Montcalm =

Former federal electoral district in Quebec, Canada

Quebec electoral district

Defunct federal electoral district
- Legislature: House of Commons
- District created: 1914
- District abolished: 1933
- First contested: 1917
- Last contested: 1930

L'Assomption—Montcalm (French pronunciation: [lasɔ̃psjɔ̃ mɔ̃kalm]) was a federal electoral district in Quebec, Canada, that was represented in the House of Commons of Canada from 1917 to 1935.

This riding was created in 1914 from parts of L'Assomption and Montcalm ridings. It consisted of the Counties of Montcalm and L'Assomption.

The district was abolished in 1933 when it was redistributed into Joliette—L'Assomption—Montcalm and Terrebonne ridings. Its only member of parliament was Paul-Arthur Séguin of the Liberal Party of Canada.

== Members of Parliament ==
This riding elected the following members of Parliament:

| Parliament | Years | Member | Party |
|---|---|---|---|
L'Assomption—Montcalm; Riding created from L'Assomption and Montcalm
| 13th | 1917–1921 | Paul-Arthur Séguin | Opposition (Laurier Liberals) |
| 14th | 1921–1925 | Paul-Arthur Séguin | Liberal |
| 15th | 1925–1926 | Paul-Arthur Séguin | Liberal |
| 16th | 1926–1930 | Paul-Arthur Séguin | Liberal |
| 17th | 1930–1935 | Paul-Arthur Séguin | Liberal |
Riding dissolved into Joliette—L'Assomption—Montcalm and Terrebonne

== Election results ==
1917 Canadian federal election
| Party | Candidate | Votes |
|---|---|---|
| Opposition (Laurier Liberals) | Paul-Arthur Séguin | 5,181 |
| Government (Unionist) | Jean-Baptiste-Trefflé Richard | 172 |

1921 Canadian federal election
| Party | Candidate | Votes |
|---|---|---|
| Liberal | Paul-Arthur Séguin | 7,408 |
| Conservative | Alfred Forest | 1,626 |
| Independent | Louis Thouin | 600 |
| Unknown | Louis Henry Vironneau | 114 |

1925 Canadian federal election
| Party | Candidate | Votes |
|---|---|---|
| Liberal | Paul-Arthur Séguin | 6,261 |
| Conservative | John Paul Monahan | 2,480 |

1926 Canadian federal election
| Party | Candidate | Votes |
|---|---|---|
| Liberal | Paul-Arthur Séguin | 6,044 |
| Conservative | Alfred Forest | 1,901 |

1930 Canadian federal election
| Party | Candidate | Votes |
|---|---|---|
| Liberal | Paul-Arthur Séguin | 6,568 |
| Conservative | Charles-Édouard Jeannotte | 4,650 |

== See also ==
- List of Canadian electoral districts
- Historical federal electoral districts of Canada
