= Boulevard du Souvenir overpass collapse =

Coordinates: 45.558325°N 73.731480°W

On June 18, 2000, the southern portion of the Boulevard du Souvenir overpass in Laval, which crosses Quebec Autoroute 15, collapsed into the roadway, killing one and injuring two when cars were crushed underneath the structure. Sixteen beams weighing 63 tons each fell. The highway was closed for several days while workers removed the debris. The remains of the structure were later demolished as well for safety reasons according to then–Quebec Transport Minister Guy Chevrette. A new overpass was built less than three years later. Another collapsed overpass incident occurred on September 30, 2006, also in Laval, on Autoroute 19 where the collapse of the De la Concorde overpass killed five, although this was for totally different reasons.

The overpass was under construction at the time the incident occurred. The company in charge of the project was Beaver Ridge, a company that was under bankruptcy protection and was without a construction license for about four months. Dessau-Soprin was an engineering firm that was supervising the project operations.

The city of Laval affirmed that, prior to the collapse, it discovered unspecified problems with some of the beams of the overpass. Beaver Ridge president Mario D'Errico told Le Devoir that the failure was caused by a rupture of one of the beams—which was later confirmed by a Transports Quebec employee—citing an instability of one of them which then consequently caused the collapse of every single beam on the south side. Generally, beams are fixed together in the form of an X

Inspectors from the Commission de la Santé et de la Sécurite du Travail (CSST) noticed some irregularities in the workplace several months before the incident. The CSST blamed Beaver Ridge for security flaws and had demanded changes in regards to the beam and formwork structures. In a report published in 2003, they had also discovered that there were communication problems at the site.

Public inquests started in late 2000 with Coroner Gilles Perron in charge of the case. After the inquest, Beaver Ridge was severely blamed for constructions flaws. In 2003, an engineer had mentioned that he had presented incomplete and inadequate plans for the project. No criminal charges were laid in the case.

Soon after the Souvenir incident, a study by the Montreal Gazette along with Transports Quebec and the City of Montreal discovered that several overpasses of the Décarie Expressway were in poor condition which required extensive repairs and renovations during the following years.
