= Ruben Charles Laurier =

Canadian politician

Member of the Canadian Parliament for L'Assomption
- In office 1907–1908
- Preceded by: Romuald-Charlemagne Laurier
- Succeeded by: Paul-Arthur Séguin

Personal details
- Born: 26 December 1868 Lachenaie, Quebec
- Died: 26 September 1947 (aged 78)
- Party: Liberal

Ruben Charles Laurier (26 December 1868 – 26 September 1947) was a physician and political figure in Quebec. He represented L'Assomption in the House of Commons of Canada from 1906 to 1908 as a Liberal.

He was born in Lachenaie, Quebec, the son of Jules Laurier and Rosalie Rochon, and was educated at the Collège de l'Assomption and the Université Laval. In 1895, he married Marie Louise. Laurier was elected to the House of Commons in a 1906 by-election held after the death of Romuald-Charlemagne Laurier. In 1925, he ran unsuccessfully as a Liberal Protectionist in the federal riding of St. James. Laurier died in Montreal at the age of 78.
