= Romuald-Charlemagne Laurier =

Canadian politician

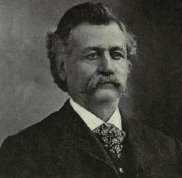

Member of the Canadian Parliament for L'Assomption
- In office 1900–1906
- Preceded by: Joseph Gauthier
- Succeeded by: Ruben Charles Laurier

Personal details
- Born: 7 January 1852 Saint-Lin, Canada East
- Died: 28 December 1906 (aged 54)
- Party: Liberal
- Relations: Wilfrid Laurier, half-brother

Romuald-Charlemagne Laurier (7 January 1852 – 28 December 1906) was a Canadian politician.

Born in Saint-Lin, Canada East, the son of Carolus Laurier and Adeline Ethier, he was the half-brother to the Prime Minister of Canada Sir Wilfrid Laurier. Laurier was educated at the Public School of St. Lin and was a general merchant by profession. He was first elected to the House of Commons of Canada for the riding of L'Assomption in the general elections of 1900. A Liberal, he was re-elected in 1904 and died while in office in 1906.

== Electoral record ==
1900 Canadian federal election: L'Assomption
Party	Candidate	Votes
Liberal	Romuald-Charlemagne Laurier	1,486
Conservative	Horace Honoré Éthier	1,138

1904 Canadian federal election: L'Assomption
Party	Candidate	Votes
Liberal	Romuald-Charlemagne Laurier	acclaimed

By-election: On Mr. Laurier's death, 28 December 1906

By-election on 7 March 1907
Party	Candidate	Votes
Liberal	Ruben Charles Laurier	1,276
Conservative	E. Lemire dit Marsolais	1,106
