= Charlemagne, Quebec =

City in Canada

Charlemagne
- City
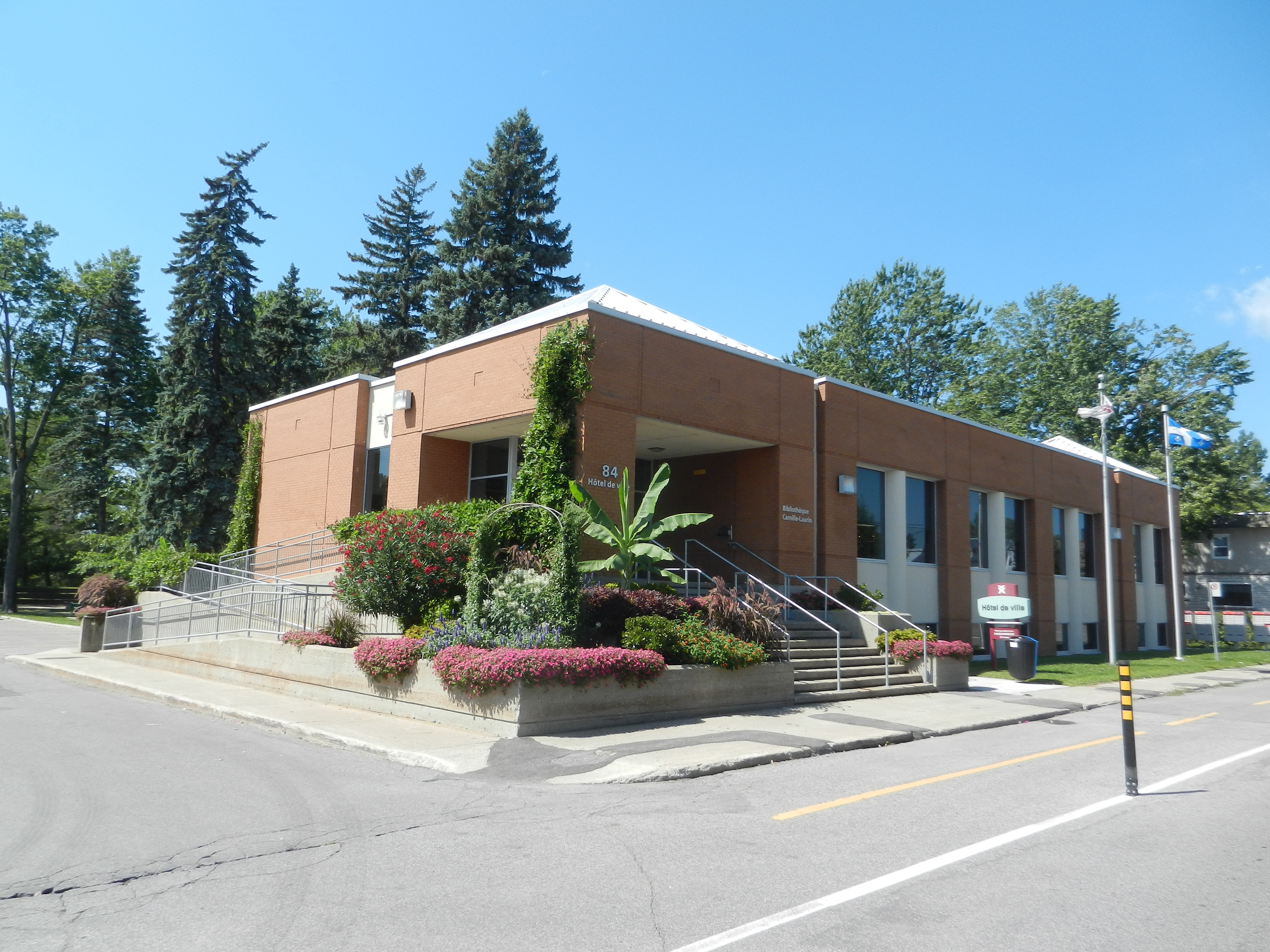
- Town hall of Charlemagne

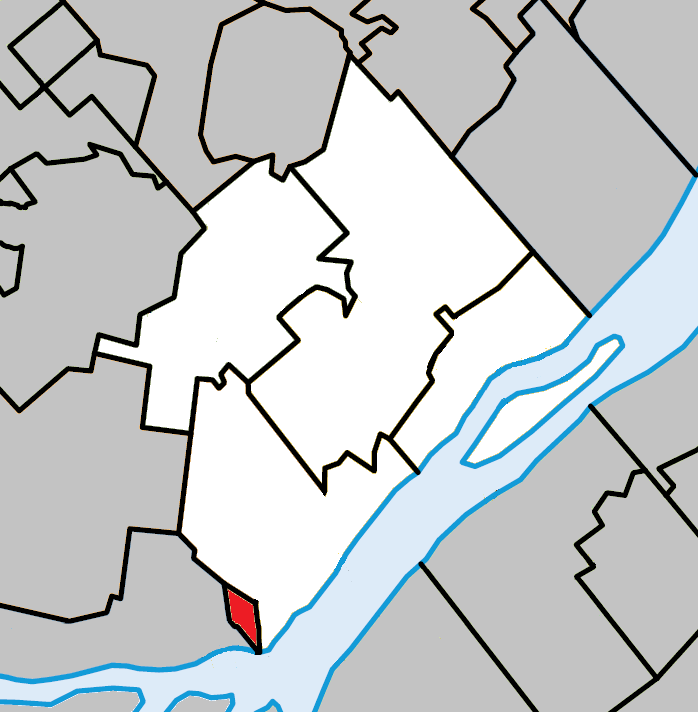
- Location within L'Assomption RCM

- Location in central Quebec
- Coordinates: 45°43′N 73°29′W
- Country: Canada
- Province: Quebec
- Region: Lanaudière
- RCM: L'Assomption
- Settled: 1870
- Constituted: November 13, 1906

Government
  - Mayor: Normand Grenier
  - Fed. riding: Repentigny
  - Prov. riding: L'Assomption

Area
  - Total: 2.31 km^{2} (0.89 sq mi)
  - Land: 2.17 km^{2} (0.84 sq mi)

Population (2021)
  - Total: 6,302
  - Density: 2,906.2/km^{2} (7,527/sq mi)
  - Change 2016–21: ▲6.6%
  - Dwellings: 3,217
- Time zone: UTC−5 (EST)
  - Summer (DST): UTC−4 (EDT)
- Postal code(s): J5Z
- Area codes: 450, 579
- Website: www.ville.charlemagne.qc.ca

Charlemagne (pronounced [ʃaʁləmaɲ]) is a city in the Canadian province of Quebec on the north shore of the Rivière des Prairies, 24 kilometres (15 mi) northeast of the city of Montreal’s downtown core, at the mouth of the L'Assomption River. As of 2021, the population was 6,302.

== History and name ==
In 1870, a paper mill was built at the mouth of the L'Assomption River by the L'Assomption Lumber Company and led to the founding of the place.

On November 13, 1906, the Village Municipality of Laurier was formed when it separated from the Parish Municipality of Saint Paul L'Ermite (now Le Gardeur, a sector of Repentigny). Five months later in April 1907, the municipality was renamed to Charlemagne. Both names were a tribute to Romuald-Charlemagne Laurier.

On October 11, 1969, Charlemagne changed its statutes to become a city (ville).

== Demographics ==
In the 2021 Canadian census conducted by Statistics Canada, Charlemagne had a population of 6,302 living in 3,149 of its 3,217 total private dwellings, an increase of 6.6% from its 2016 population of 5,913. With a land area of 2.17 km^{2} (0.84 sq mi), it had a population density of 2,904.1 people per square kilometre (7,522 people/sq mi) in 2021.

Canada census – Charlemagne community profile

	2021	2016	2011
Population	6,302 (+6.6% from 2016)	5,913 (+1.0% from 2011)	5,853 (+4.6% from 2006)
Land area	2.17 km^{2} (0.84 sq mi)	2.19 km^{2} (0.85 sq mi)	2.16 km^{2} (0.83 sq mi)
Population density	2,906.2/km^{2} (7,527/sq mi)	2,706.2/km^{2} (7,009/sq mi)	2,704.0/km^{2} (7,003/sq mi)
Median age	49.2 (M: 46.0, F: 51.6)	49.6 (M: 47.5, F: 51.5)	47.4 (M: 45.8, F: 48.8)
Private dwellings	3,217 (total) 3,149 (occupied)	2,962 (total) 2,878 (occupied)	2,863 (total)
Median household income	$66,000	$55,808	$48,351

References: 2021 2016 2011

Historical census data - Charlemagne, Quebec

Year	Pop.	±%
1911	776	—
1921	829	+6.8%
1931	813	−1.9%
1941	1,150	+41.5%
1951	1,856	+61.4%
1956	2,428	+30.8%
1961	3,068	+26.4%

Year	Pop.	±%
1966	3,569	+16.3%
1971	4,111	+15.2%
1976	4,025	−2.1%
1981	4,827	+19.9%
1986	5,331	+10.4%
1991	5,598	+5.0%
1996	5,739	+2.5%

Year	Pop.	±%
2001	5,662	−1.3%
2006	5,594	−1.2%
2011	5,853	+4.6%
2016	5,913	+1.0%
2021	6,302	+6.6%

Source: Statistics Canada

Canada Census mother tongue - Charlemagne, Quebec
Census	Total	French			English			French & English			Other		
Year	Responses	Count	Trend	Pop %	Count	Trend	Pop %	Count	Trend	Pop %	Count	Trend	Pop %
2011	5,835	5,535	▲2.8%	94.86%	90	▲63.6%	1.54%	25	▲150.0%	0.43%	185	▲32.1%	3.17%
2006	5,590	5,385	▼3.1%	96.33%	55	▼15.4%	0.98%	10	▲ n/a%	0.18%	140	▲250.0%	2.50%
2001	5,665	5,560	▼0.5%	98.15%	65	▲8.3%	1.15%	0	0.0%	0.00%	40	▼20.0%	0.71%
1996	5,700	5,590	n/a	98.07%	60	n/a	1.05%	0	n/a	0.00%	50	n/a	0.88%

== Notable people ==
Charlemagne is the birthplace and childhood hometown of singer Céline Dion, known for the song "My Heart Will Go On" from the 1997 film Titanic; the town council named one of its main streets after her without the recognition of a Quebec commission. Additionally, the town erected a sculpture on Dion's behalf.

Charlemagne is also the birthplace of politician Camille Laurin.

== See also ==
- List of cities in Quebec
