= Papineau Avenue =

Thoroughfare in Montreal, Canada

Coordinates: 45°31′23″N 73°33′11″W

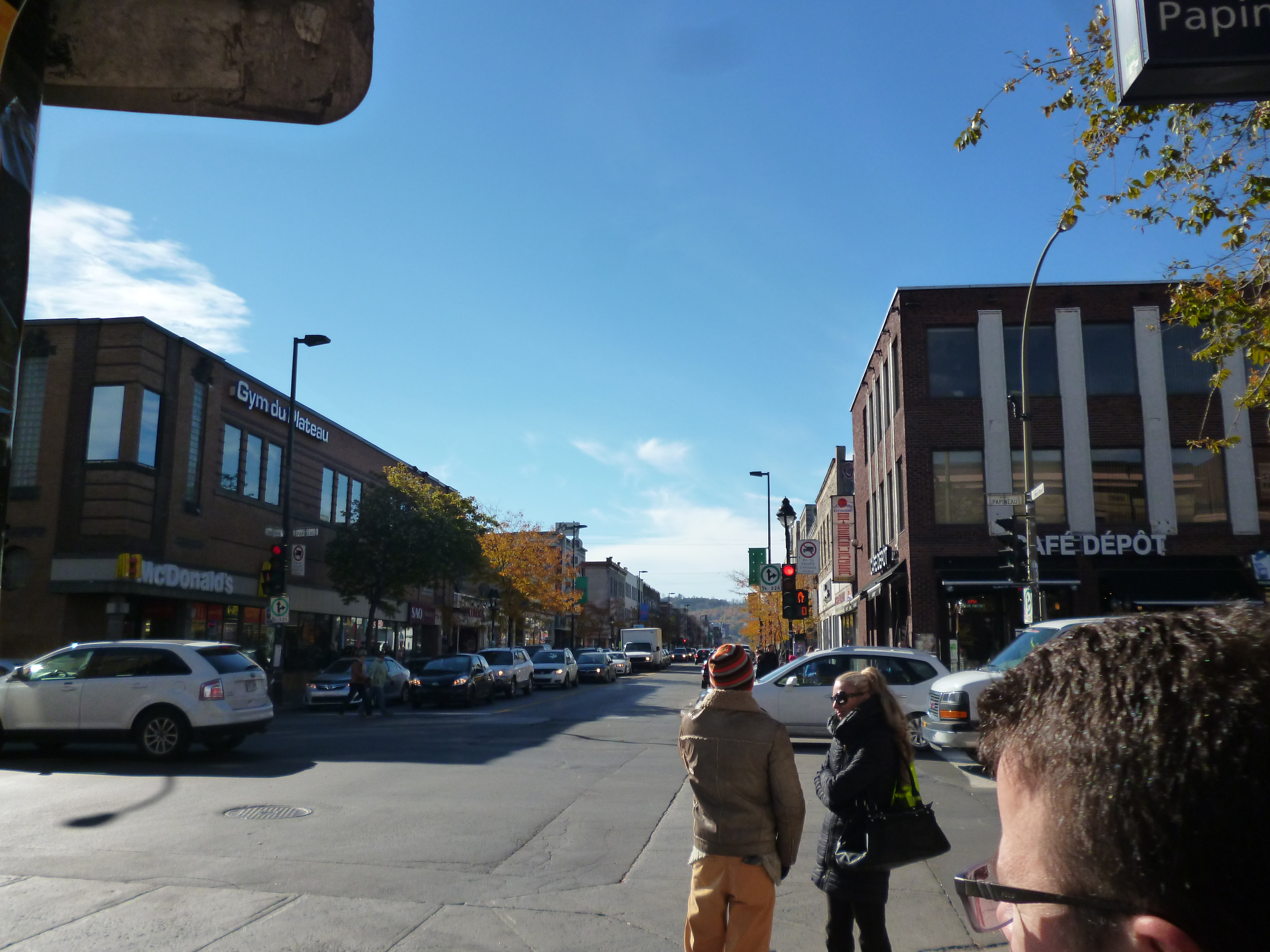
- papineau Avenue at Mont Royal Avenue
- Native name: avenue Papineau (French)
- Part of: A-19 north of A-40 (TCH); R-134 West between Sherbrooke Street and Lafontaine Street
- Namesake: Joseph Papineau
- Length: 10.5 km (6.5 mi)
- Location: Montreal
- South end: Notre-Dame Street
- Major junctions: A-40; R-138
- North end: Papineau-Leblanc Bridge (continues into Laval)

Construction
- Inauguration: 1890

Papineau Avenue (French: avenue Papineau) is the longest north–south street in Montreal, Quebec, Canada. The part of the street between Henri Bourassa Boulevard and Quebec Autoroute 40 is the Montreal portion of Quebec Autoroute 19, commonly referred to as Autoroute Papineau. North of Henri Bourassa Boulevard, it becomes a true autoroute before crossing the Rivière des Prairies on the Papineau-Leblanc Bridge. In the south, the avenue ends at Notre-Dame Street.

It traverses the boroughs of Ville-Marie, Le Plateau-Mont-Royal, Rosemont–La Petite-Patrie, Villeray-St-Michel-Parc-Extension and Ahuntsic-Cartierville.

The street is named after Joseph Papineau, Lower Canadian politician and father of Louis-Joseph Papineau, the leader of the reformist Patriote movement and belligerent in the Lower Canada Rebellion of 1837.

== Transportation ==
The street is served by the Papineau Montreal Metro station which is located one block east on Saint Catherine Street. The Fabre metro station also has an entrance to Papineau, on the adjacent Jean-Talon Street.

The street is also served by three STM bus routes. The 45 Papineau serves the street during the daytime, the 445 Papineau on weekdays and the 359 Papineau serves the street at night.
