= Quebec Autoroute 40 =

Highway in Quebec

Autoroute 40
- Route Transcanadienne
- Autoroute Félix-Leclerc; Metropolitan Expressway

Route information
- Maintained by Transports Québec
- Length: 347 km (216 mi)
- Existed: 1959–present

Major junctions
- West end: Highway 417 / TCH at the Ontario border near Pointe-Fortune
- A-30 in Vaudreuil-Dorion; A-13 in Montreal; A-15 (TCH) in Montreal; A-25 (TCH) in Montreal; A-640 in Charlemagne; A-31 in Lavaltrie; A-55 in Trois-Rivières; A-73 in Quebec City; A-440 in Quebec City; A-573 in Quebec City
- East end: R-138 / R-368 in Quebec City

Location
- Country: Canada
- Province: Quebec
- Major cities: Montreal, Terrebonne, Repentigny, Trois-Rivières, Quebec City

Highway system
- Trans-Canada Highway; Quebec provincial highways; Autoroutes; List; Former
← A-35	→ A-50

Autoroute 40, officially known as Autoroute Félix-Leclerc outside Montreal and Metropolitan Autoroute/Autoroute Métropolitaine within Montreal, is an Autoroute on the north shore of the St. Lawrence River in the Canadian province of Quebec. It is one of the two major connections between Montreal and Quebec City, the other being Autoroute 20 on the south shore of the St. Lawrence. Autoroute 40 is currently 347 km (215.6 mi) long. Between the Ontario–Quebec boundary and the interchange with Autoroute 25, the route is signed as part of the Trans-Canada Highway.

== Route description ==
The western terminus of Autoroute 40 is located at the Ontario–Quebec border, where it continues as Highway 417 towards Ottawa; the eastern terminus is in Boischatel, where it transitions into Route 138 at the end of the freeway.

The portion of Autoroute 40 from the Ontario border to Autoroute 25 is part of the Trans-Canada Highway. The Metropolitan Autoroute portion in Montreal is the busiest highway in Quebec, the busiest section of the Trans-Canada Highway, as well as the second busiest highway section overall in Canada after Highway 401 in Toronto.

== History ==
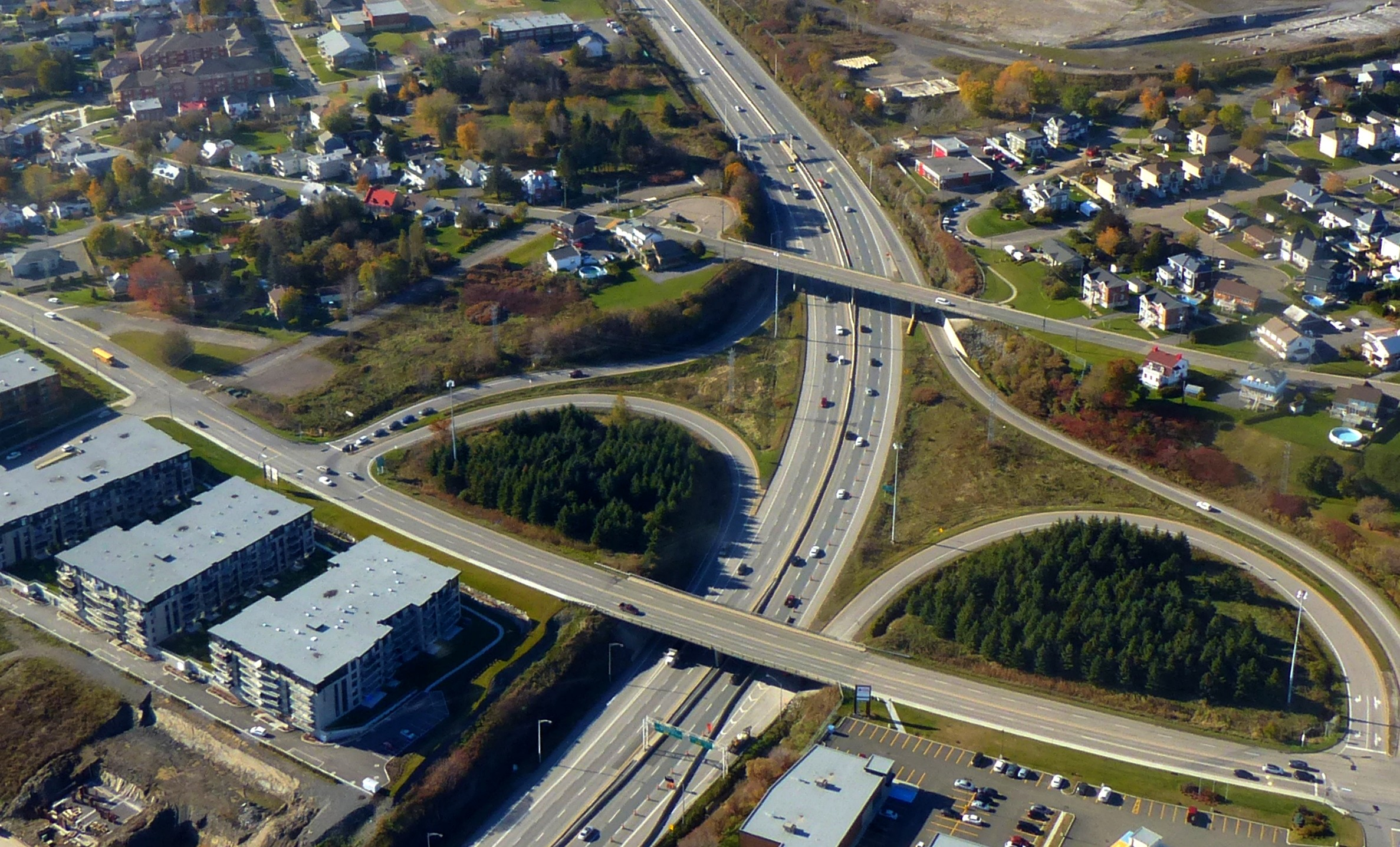
Autoroute 40 (Autoroute Felix-Leclerc) in Quebec City

Two sections of Autoroute 40 were not part of the original plans: The original intention was to bypass Trois-Rivières to the north (the existing A-40 through downtown had been Autoroute 755 and the concurrency with Autoroute 55 would have been temporary). In addition, a different route was originally planned around Quebec City south of Jean Lesage International Airport (the existing 12 km (7 mi) segment of Autoroute 40 between Saint-Augustin-de-Desmaures and Autoroute 73 would have been the western end of Autoroute 440, thus explaining the exit numbering starting at 12). While the right-of-ways of both bypasses still exist and may still be developed in the future as congestion increases, there are no immediate plans to renew construction.

A 25 km (16 mi) stretch of the highway in Pointe-Claire, from roughly St. John's Boulevard, near Fairview Pointe-Claire Shopping Centre, to the turnaround loop, Senneville Road was used during the 1976 Summer Olympics for the men's road team time trial cycling race.

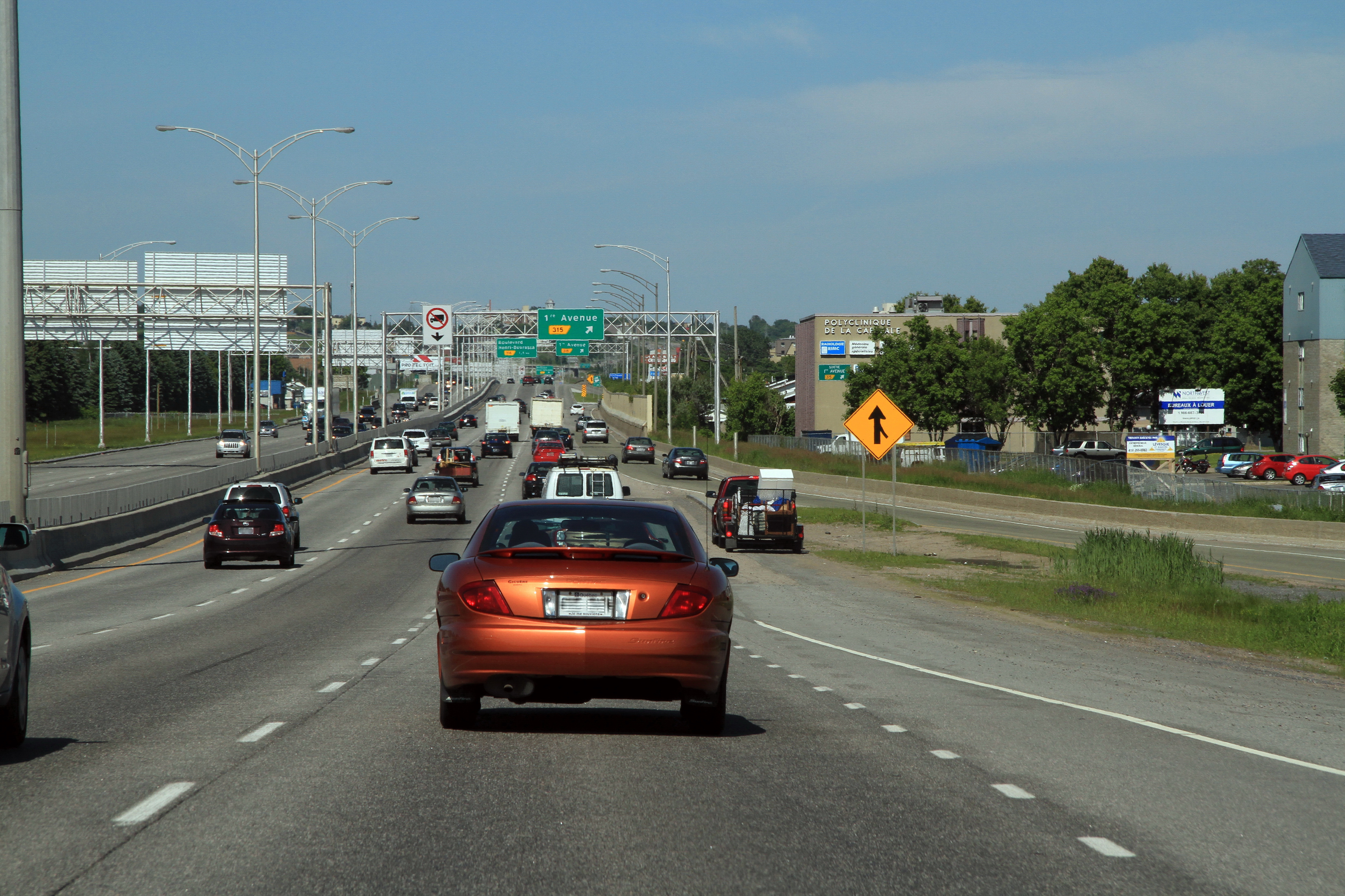
A-40 eastbound near the interchange with A-73 in Quebec City

In 1997, the highway (apart from the portion served by the Metropolitan Autoroute) was renamed Autoroute Félix-Leclerc after the late Quebec artist and political activist Félix Leclerc.

Prior to 1997, Autoroute 40 east of Montreal had four different names, the first section was named Autoroute de la Rive-Nord (North Shore Autoroute) between Montréal and Saint-Augustin-de-Desmaures (km 87 to 196, 209 to 296). A segment in Trois-Rivières east of Autoroute 55 that was named Autoroute de Francheville (Francheville Autoroute) (km 196 to 207). Between Saint-Augustin-de-Desmaures and Autoroute 73 in Quebec City (km 296 to 307) it was called Autoroute Charest. Finally, between the junction of Autoroute 73 and Autoroute 573 and its eastern end at Route 138 it was known as Autoroute de la Capitale, a name that is still commonly used by Quebec City residents.

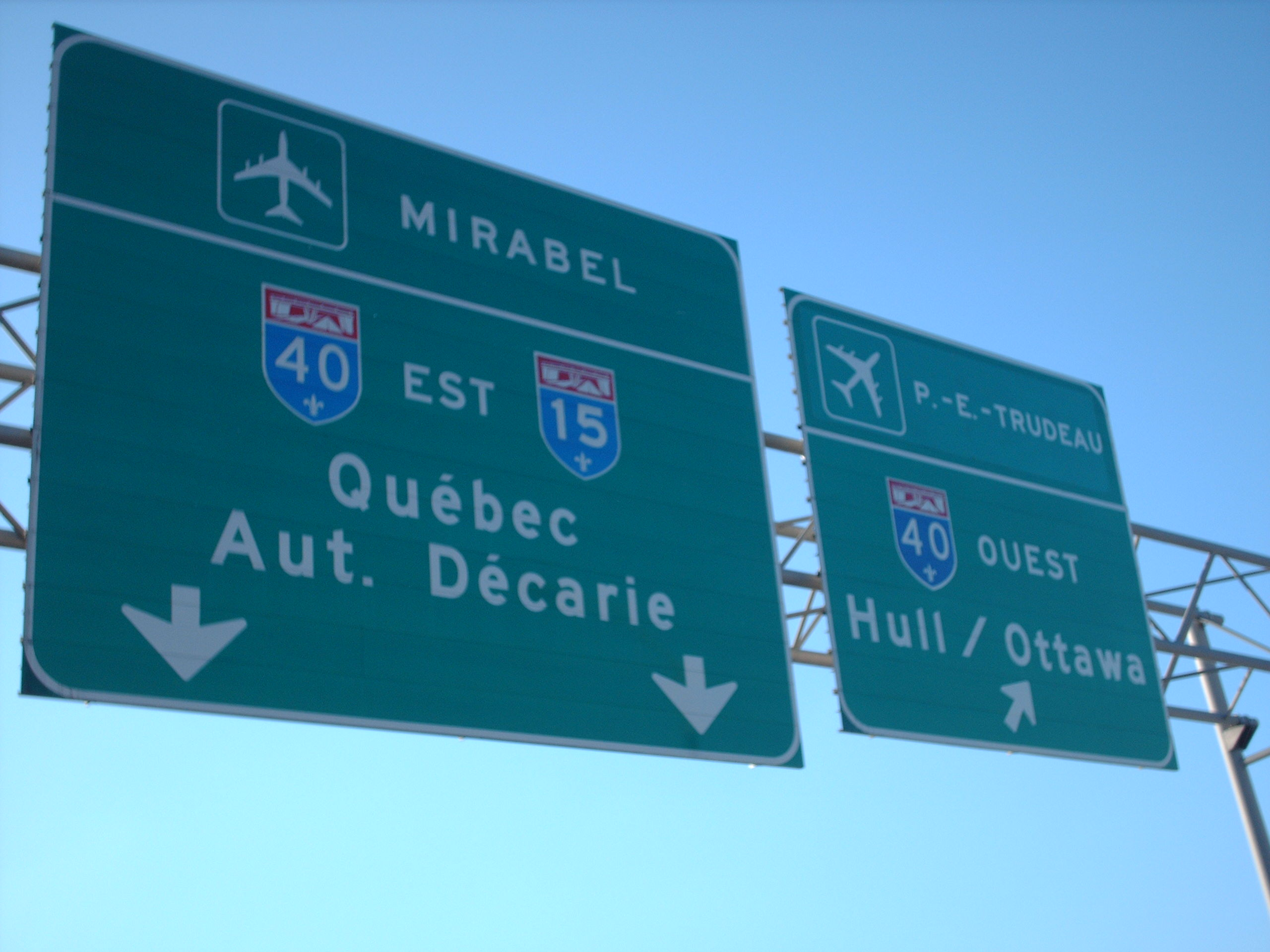
Direction to Autoroute 40/15 road signs photographed in Montreal

== Exit list ==
RCM	Location	km	mi	Exit	Destinations	Notes
Vaudreuil-Soulanges	Pointe-Fortune	0.0	0.0	—	Highway 417 west / TCH – Ottawa	Continuation into Ontario
Vaudreuil-Soulanges	Pointe-Fortune	0.0	0.0	1	R-342 east – Pointe-Fortune	Straddles the Ontario border; also signed as exit 1 for Hwy 417
Vaudreuil-Soulanges	Rigaud	2.7	1.7	2	Montée Wilson – Pointe-Fortune	
Vaudreuil-Soulanges	Rigaud	6.2	3.9	6	Montée de la Baie-Saint-Thomas	
Vaudreuil-Soulanges	Rigaud	9.4	5.8	9	R-342 – Rigaud	
Vaudreuil-Soulanges	Rigaud	11.8	7.3	12	R-342 – Rigaud	Rigaud Service Centre (Not directly accessed from A-40)
Vaudreuil-Soulanges	Rigaud	16.9	10.5	17	R-201 (Montée Lavigne) – Salaberry-de-Valleyfield	
Vaudreuil-Soulanges	Saint-Lazare	22.0	13.7	22	Hudson, Saint-Lazare	
Vaudreuil-Soulanges	Vaudreuil-Dorion	26.5	16.5	26	To R-342 – Hudson, Saint-Lazare	Eastbound access to Route 342
Vaudreuil-Soulanges	Vaudreuil-Dorion	27.5	17.1	28	R-342 – Hudson	Westbound exit and eastbound entrance
Vaudreuil-Soulanges	Vaudreuil-Dorion	32.6	20.3	32	A-30 east to A-20 / Highway 401 – Sorel-Tracy, Toronto	A-30 exit 1; former A-540
Vaudreuil-Soulanges	Vaudreuil-Dorion	34.7	21.6	35	Avenue Saint-Charles – Vaudreuil-Dorion, Vaudreuil-sur-le-Lac	
Vaudreuil-Soulanges	Vaudreuil-Dorion	36.6	22.7	36	Chemin Dumberry, Chemin des Chenaux	Westbound exit and eastbound entrance
Lake of Two Mountains (Lac des Deux Montagnes)		38.4– 40.3	23.9– 25.0	Pont de l’Île aux Tourtes (Île aux Tourtes Bridge)		
Montréal	Senneville	40.3	25.0	40	Chemin de Senneville	Westbound exit and eastbound entrance
Montréal	Sainte-Anne-de-Bellevue	42.0	26.1	41	Sainte-Anne-de-Bellevue, Île-Perrot	
Montréal	Sainte-Anne-de-Bellevue – Baie-D'Urfé boundary	44.7	27.8	44	Boulevard Morgan	
Montréal	Kirkland	47.8	29.7	49	Chemin Sainte-Marie	
Montréal	Kirkland	50.0	31.1	50	Boulevard Saint-Charles	
Montréal	Pointe-Claire	52.9	32.9	52	Boulevard Saint-Jean	
Montréal	Pointe-Claire – Dorval boundary	56.0	34.8	55	Boulevard des Sources	
Montréal	Montréal	57.6	35.8	58	Boulevard Hymus, Boulevard Alfred-Nobel, Boulevard Henri-Bourassa	Eastbound exit
Montréal	Montréal	59.9– 61.4	37.2– 38.2	60	A-13 – Montréal Centre-Ville, Laval, P.E. Trudeau Airport, Mirabel Airport	A-13 exit 6
Montréal	Montréal	61.7– 63.1	38.3– 39.2	62	Boulevard de la Côte-Vertu	
Montréal	Montréal	61.7– 63.1	38.3– 39.2	62	Boulevard Henri-Bourassa, Boulevard Hymus	Westbound exit
Montréal	Montréal	63.9	39.7	64	Boulevard Cavendish	
Montréal	Montréal	65.3	40.6	65	A-520 west (Autoroute Côte-de-Liesse) – P.E. Trudeau Airport	
Montréal	Montréal	65.3	40.6	65	Boulevard Marcel-Laurin (R-117 north)	Eastbound exit
Montréal	Montréal – Mount Royal boundary	66.4– 67.1	41.3– 41.7	66	A-15 south (Autoroute Décarie) – Montréal Centre-Ville, Pont Champlain, New York	Décarie Interchange; A-15 exit 70; west end of A-15 concurrency
Montréal	Montréal – Mount Royal boundary	66.4– 67.1	41.3– 41.7	West end of Metropolitan Autoroute / Autoroute Métropolitaine		
Montréal	Montréal – Mount Royal boundary	68.1	42.3	68	Rue Stinson, Chemin Rockland, Boulevard de l'Acadie	Eastbound exit
Montréal	Montréal – Mount Royal boundary	69.2– 70.0	43.0– 43.5	70	A-15 (TCH) north (Autoroute des Laurentides) – Laval, Mirabel Airport	A-15 exit 1; east end of A-15 concurrency
Montréal	Montréal – Mount Royal boundary	69.2– 70.0	43.0– 43.5	70	Boulevard Marcel-Laurin (R-117 north), Chemin Rockland	Westbound exit
Montréal	Montréal – Mount Royal boundary	69.2– 70.0	43.0– 43.5	71	Boulevard Saint-Laurent, Rue Saint-Denis (R-335)	Eastbound exit
Montréal	Montréal	71.1	44.2	71	Boulevard Saint-Laurent, Boulevard de l'Acadie	Westbound exit
Montréal	Montréal	72.4	45.0	73	To A-19 north / Rue Saint-Hubert, Avenue Christophe-Colomb, Avenue Papineau	Eastbound exit
Montréal	Montréal	73.4	45.6	73	Avenue Christophe-Colomb, Rue Saint-Hubert, Rue Saint-Denis (R-335)	Westbound exit
Montréal	Montréal	74.2	46.1	74	Rue d'Iberville	Eastbound exit
Montréal	Montréal	75.1	46.7	75	Boulevard Saint-Michel	
Montréal	Montréal	75.1	46.7	75	To A-19 north / Avenue Papineau	Westbound exit
Montréal	Montréal	75.7	47.0	76	Boulevard Pie-IX (R-125), Boulevard Viau	Eastbound exit
Montréal	Montréal	77.1	47.9	77	Boulevard Lacordaire	Westbound exit
Montréal	Montréal	78.2	48.6	76	Boulevard Lacordaire, Boulevard Viau, Boulevard Pie-IX (R-125)	Westbound exit
Montréal	Montréal	79.2	49.2	78	Boulevard Langelier, Boulevard des Galeries-d'Anjou	
Montréal	Montréal	80.3– 81.2	49.9– 50.5	80	A-25 (TCH) to A-20 – Laval, Tunnel Louis-Hippolyte-Lafontaine	Trans-Canada Highway follows A-25 south; signed as exits 80-S (south) and 80-N (north); A-25 exit 8
Montréal	Montréal	81.7– 83.1	50.8– 51.6	82	Boulevard Roi-René, Boulevard Ray-Lawson	
Montréal	Montréal-Est	82.9	51.5	83	Boulevard Bourget, Avenue Marien, Boulevard Saint-Jean-Baptiste	Eastbound exit and westbound entrance
Montréal	Montréal	86.7	53.9	87	Rue Sherbrooke (R-138) Boulevard Henri-Bourassa	Eastbound exit
Montréal	Montréal	87.4	54.3	85	Boulevard Saint-Jean-Baptiste, Boulevard Tricentenaire, Avenue Marien	Westbound exit
Montréal	Montréal	88.9	55.2	89	Rue Sherbrooke (R-138), Boulevard Henri-Bourassa	Westbound exit
Montréal	Montréal	88.9	55.2	East end of Metropolitan Autoroute / Autoroute Métropolitaine		
Montréal	Montréal	91.9	57.1	92	Boulevard Gouin	Eastbound exit and westbound entrance
Rivière des Prairies		92.3– 93.3	57.4– 58.0	Pont Charles-de Gaulle (Charles de Gaulle Bridge)		
Les Moulins	Terrebonne	94.1	58.5	94	R-344 – Terrebonne	
Les Moulins – L'Assomption boundary	Terrebonne – Charlemagne boundary	95.2– 96.2	59.2– 59.8	96	A-640 – Charlemagne, Laval, Saint-Eustache, Mirabel Airport	Signed as exits 96-E (east) and 96-O (west); A-640 exit 52
L'Assomption	Repentigny	97.0	60.3	97	Boulevard Pierre-Le Gardeur – Repentigny, Charlemagne	Eastbound exit and westbound entrance
L'Assomption	Repentigny	97.8	60.8	98	Boulevard Larochelle, Boulevard Brien – Repentigny	Eastbound exit; west end of collector/express lanes
L'Assomption	Repentigny	100.0	62.1	100	Boulevard Industriel, Rue Valmont	Eastbound exit
L'Assomption	Repentigny	102.0	63.4	100	Boulevard Industriel, Boulevard Larochelle, Boulevard Brien – Repentigny	Westbound exit; east end of collector/express lanes
L'Assomption	Repentigny	102.4	63.6	102	Rue Valmont	Westbound exit
L'Assomption	Repentigny – L'Assomption boundary	106.1	65.9	108	R-341 (Boulevard Louis-Philippe Picard) – L'Assomption, L'Épiphanie	Formerly exit 106
L'Assomption	Saint-Sulpice	109.6	68.1	110	R-343 – L'Assomption, Saint-Sulpice	Formerly exit 108
D'Autray	Lavaltrie	117.9	73.3	Point-du-Jour Rest Area (Eastbound and westbound; entrances signed as "Exit 118"; former Service Centre with fuel/food)		
D'Autray	Lavaltrie	121.7	75.6	122	A-31 north / R-131 – Joliette, Lavaltrie	A-31 exit 1
D'Autray	Lanoraie	129.6	80.5	130	Lanoraie	
D'Autray	Sainte-Geneviève-de-Berthier	140.7	87.4	141	Rang Sainte-Philomène	Eastbound exit and westbound entrance
D'Autray	Berthierville	143.1	88.9	144	R-158 – Saint-Gabriel, Berthierville	
D'Autray	Saint-Cuthbert	150.1	93.3	151	R-138 – Saint-Cuthbert	
D'Autray	Saint-Barthélemy	155.6	96.7	155	Saint-Barthélemy, Maskinongé	
Maskinongé	Maskinongé	161.0	100.0	160	Rang de la Rivière Sud-Est	
Maskinongé	Maskinongé	163.0	101.3	Baie-de-Maskinongé Service Centre (Eastbound); Concession-de-la-Rivière Rest Stop (Westbound; closed)		
Maskinongé	Louiseville	167.5	104.1	166	Louiseville, Maskinongé	Unnamed access to R-138
Maskinongé	Louiseville – Yamachiche boundary	175.3	108.9	174	R-138 – Louiseville, Yamachiche	
Maskinongé	Yamachiche	180.5	112.2	180	R-153 north – Yamachiche	
Trois-Rivières		188.1	116.9	187	R-138 (Rue Notre-Dame O) – Yamachiche	
Trois-Rivières		190.3	118.2	189	Rang St-Charles	
Trois-Rivières		192.6	119.7	192	Chemin des Petites-Terres	
Trois-Rivières		197.4	122.7	196 186	A-55 north to R-155 / Boulevard des Forges – Shawinigan	West end of A-55 concurrency; A-55 exit 186; exit numbers follow A-55
Trois-Rivières		199.9	124.2	183	Boulevard Jean-XXIII	
Trois-Rivières		200.9	124.8	182 197	A-55 south – Pont Laviolette, Victoriaville, Drummondville, Vermont	East end of A-55 concurrency; A-55 exit 182; A-40 exit numbers resume
Trois-Rivières		202.6	125.9	198	Boulevard des Récollets	
Trois-Rivières		204.2– 205.2	126.9– 127.5	199	Boulevard des Forges – Trois-Rivières Centre-Ville	
Trois-Rivières		207.3	128.8	201	Boulevard des Chenaux	
Trois-Rivières		207.3– 207.7	128.8– 129.1	Pont Radisson (Radisson Bridge) crosses Saint-Maurice River		
Trois-Rivières		207.7	129.1	202	Boulevard des Estacades	
Trois-Rivières		209.4	130.1	203	R-157 (Rue Thibeau) – Notre-Dame-du-Mont-Carmel, Shawinigan	Eastbound signed as exits 203-S (south) and 203-N (north)
Trois-Rivières		211.6	131.5	205	Boulevard des Prairies	
Trois-Rivières		218.5	135.8	210	R-352 north – Saint-Maurice	
Les Chenaux	Champlain	227.9	141.6	220	R-359 – Saint-Luc-de-Vincennes, Saint-Narcisse, Champlain	
Les Chenaux	Sainte-Geneviève-de-Batiscan	237.2	147.4	229	R-361 – Batiscan, Sainte-Geneviève-de-Batiscan	
Les Chenaux	Sainte-Anne-de-la-Pérade	246.5	153.2	236	R-159 – Saint-Prosper, Saint-Casimir, Saint-Tite, Sainte-Anne-de-la-Pérade	
Portneuf	Deschambault-Grondines	260.4	161.8	250	Chemin de St-Casimir	
Portneuf	Deschambault-Grondines	265.4	164.9	254	R-363 – Saint-Marc-des-Carrières, Deschambault-Grondines	
Portneuf	Deschambault-Grondines	270.6	168.1	257	Route Proulx – Saint-Gilbert Portneuf, Quebec	
Portneuf	Portneuf	276.2	171.6	261	Portneuf	
Portneuf	Cap-Santé	284.5	176.8	269	R-358 – Pont-Rouge, Saint-Basile, Cap-Santé	
Portneuf	Donnacona	289.2	179.7	274	Donnacona	
Portneuf	Neuville	296.4	184.2	281	R-365 – Pont-Rouge, Saint-Raymond, Neuville	Westbound signed as exits 281-N (north) and 281-S (south)
Portneuf	Neuville	300.0	186.4	285	Neuville	
Québec	Saint-Augustin-de-Desmaures	304.8	189.4	Cap-de-Pierre Service Centre (Eastbound)		
Québec	Saint-Augustin-de-Desmaures	310.2	192.7	295	R-367 (Route de Fossambault) – Sainte-Catherine-de-la-Jacques-Cartier, Saint-Augustin-de-Desmaures	
Québec	Saint-Augustin-de-Desmaures	314.4	195.4	298	R-138 – Saint-Augustin-de-Desmaures, L'Ancienne-Lorette	Signed as exits 298-O (west) and 298-E (east)
Québec	Saint-Augustin-de-Desmaures	316.5	196.7	300	Chemin du Lac	
Québec	Québec	318.8	198.1	302	Route Jean-Gauvin, Cap Rouge	
Québec	Québec	320.3	199.0	304	Avenue Le Gendre	
Québec	Québec	321.4– 322.5	199.7– 200.4	305	A-540 (Autoroute Duplessis) to A-20 – Jean Lesage International Airport, Pont Pierre-Laporte	Signed as exits 305-S (south) and 305-N (north); A-540 exit 3
Québec	Québec	323.0	200.7	306	Avenue Blaise-Pascal	
Québec	Québec	323.6– 324.5	201.1– 201.6	307 139	A-73 south (Autoroute Henri-IV) to A-20 – Pont Pierre-Laporte Autoroute Charest (A-440) – Quebec Centre-Ville	West end of A-73 concurrency; eastbound signed as exits 307-S (south) and 307-N (north), westbound signed as exits 139-O (west) and 139-E (east); A-73 exit 139; A-440 exit 4; exit numbers follow A-73
Québec	Québec	324.8	201.8	140	Rue Einstein	Westbound shares exit with exit 139-O
Québec	Québec	326.1	202.6	141	Boulevard Wilfrid-Hamel (R-138)	
Québec	Québec	327.0– 327.6	203.2– 203.6	142 307	A-573 north (Autoroute Henri-IV) – Shannon	Autoroute Henri-IV follows A-573; A-40 / A-73 become Autoroute Félix Leclerc; signed as exit 142 (eastbound) and exit 307 (westbound); A-40 exit numbers resume; A-573 exit 1
Québec	Québec	328.0	203.8	308	Boulevard Masson, Boulevard de l'Ormiere, Rue Armand-Viau	Rue Armand-Viau not signed eastbound
Québec	Québec	329.2– 330.9	204.6– 205.6	310	A-740 (Autoroute Robert-Bourassa), Boulevard Saint-Jacques	A-740 exit 9
Québec	Québec	331.7– 332.4	206.1– 206.5	312	Boulevard Pierre-Bertrand (R-358)	Signed as exits 312-S (south) and 312-N (north)
Québec	Québec	332.9– 333.9	206.9– 207.5	313	A-73 north / A-973 south / R-175 – Saguenay, Alma, Quebec Centre-Ville	East end of A-73 concurrency; signed as exits 313-S (south), 313-N (north); A-73 / A-973 exit 148
Québec	Québec	334.6	207.9	315	1^{ère} Avenue	
Québec	Québec	335.6	208.5	316	Boulevard Henri-Bourassa	
Québec	Québec	337.5	209.7	318	Avenue du Bourg-Royal	
Québec	Québec	338.5	210.3	319	Avenue Saint-David	
Québec	Québec	339.8	211.1	320	Rue Seigneuriale	
Québec	Québec	341.1	211.9	321	Rue Labelle	
Québec	Québec	342.4	212.8	322	Boulevard des Chutes	
Québec	Québec	343.3	213.3	323	A-440 west (Autoroute Dufferin-Montmorency) – Quebec Centre-Ville	A-440 exit 29
Québec	Québec	345.3	214.6	325	Boulevard Sainte-Anne (R-138 west) / R-368 south – Montmorency Falls, Île d'Orléans	
Québec	Québec	345.3	214.6	—	R-138 east – Sainte-Anne-de-Beaupré	A-40 eastern terminus; continues as R-138 east
1.000 mi = 1.609 km; 1.000 km = 0.621 mi: Concurrency terminus; Incomplete access; Route transition

== Rest stops ==
Location	Name	km	Direction	Services
Saint-Augustin-de-Desmaures, Quebec	Aire de service du Cap-de-Pierre		Eastbound	Food – Valentine, rest rooms, parking for trucks, RVs and cars.
Neuville, Quebec			Westbound	Unofficial rest area accessed via on/off ramps for A-40. Filling station – Shell, Food – Valentine, Electric charging stations.
Maskinongé, Quebec	Aire de service du Baie-de-Maskinongé		Eastbound	Food – Valentine, A&W, Tim Hortons and Couche Tard, tourist information, rest rooms. Esso (independent operated with using Esso-brand fuel), Electric charge stations. Parking for cars, RV and trucks.
Maskinongé, Quebec	Halte du Maskinongé		Westbound	Closed around 2021–2022 with Portable toilets removed from site and entry roadway blocked. Located across from Eastbound service centre.
Lavaltrie, Quebec	Aire de service du Point-du-Jour		Bi-directional	Vending machines, tourist information, rest rooms. Electric charging station. Les Rôtisseries Benny restaruant was closed after 2016 and now vacant area. Current rest area building was formerly Esso service station (with Marché Express) and Tim Hortons.

== See also ==
- List of crossings of the Ottawa River
- List of bridges in Montreal

Trans-Canada Highway
Previous routes Autoroute 15 ON Highway 417	Autoroute 40	Next route Autoroute 25
