= Quebec Autoroute 19 =

Highway in Quebec

Autoroute 19
- Autoroute Papineau
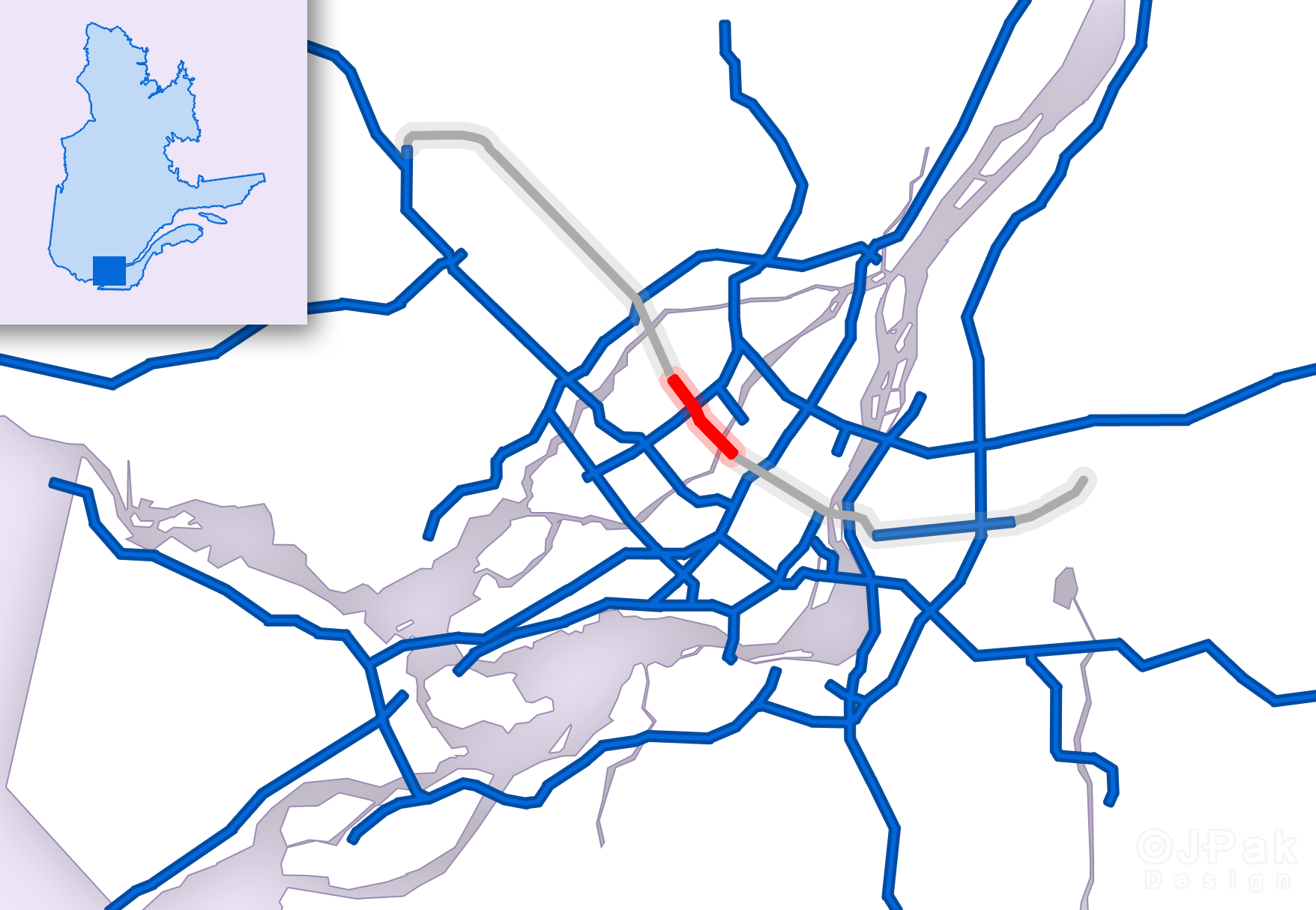

Route information
- Maintained by Transports Québec
- Length: 10.1 km (6.3 mi)
- Existed: 1970–present

Major junctions
- South end: Henri Bourassa Boulevard in Montreal
- A-440 / R-335 in Laval
- North end: R-335 / Boul. Dagenais Est in Laval

Location
- Country: Canada
- Province: Quebec
- Major cities: Montréal, Laval

Highway system
- Quebec provincial highways; Autoroutes; List; Former
← A-15	→ A-20

Autoroute 19, also known as Autoroute Papineau (Papineau Expressway), is an autoroute in Quebec. It crosses the Rivière des Prairies via the Papineau-Leblanc Bridge, connecting the borough of Ahuntsic-Cartierville in Montreal and the Duvernay neighbourhood in Laval.

A super two highway exists in Bois-des-Filion, north of Route 344 and south of Autoroute 640, just north of Pont David, which runs on the Highway 19 right-of-way and is part of Route 335.

Autoroute 19 was signed along Papineau Avenue in Montreal between Autoroute 40 and Henri Bourassa Boulevard until 2011; however, it was not officially considered part of Autoroute 19 as it is a street. It was once envisioned that A-19 would extend to the Jacques Cartier Bridge, and run below surface level south of the Metropolitan Expressway, like the Decarie Expressway. An autoroute-grade limited access expressway exists between the southern end of the Jacques Cartier Bridge and the northern end of the limited access expressway portion Route 116/Route 112 in St. Hubert, that is otherwise unsigned. The 112/116 expressway from the Jacques Cartier Bridge approach (the southern end of A-19) to Quebec Autoroute 30 was to have been designated Quebec Autoroute 16.

== Year of construction ==
- 1970: Henri-Bourassa Blvd. to Lévesque Blvd.
- 1972: Lévesque Blvd. to St-Martin Blvd. (formerly Route 148)
- 1976: St-Martin Blvd. (formerly Route 148) to Autoroute 440
- 1990: Laval freeway (Autoroute 440) to Dagenais Blvd.

== Annual average daily traffic ==
- Lowest annual average daily traffic: 12,400 (between R-148 and A-440) (2000)
- Highest annual average daily traffic: 57,000 (Papineau-Leblanc Bridge) (2000)

== Expansion of Highway 19 ==
Autoroute 19 is being extended to Autoroute 640 in Bois-des-Filion with anticipated completion in 2027, with the first phase being a 1.5 km (0.9 mi) extension and an interchange at Rue Saint-Saëns.

The project also includes:

- Construction of four new interchanges: Boulevard Dagenais Est, Rue Saint-Saëns Est, Boulevard des Laurentides / Boulevard des Mille-Îles, and Route 344 (Boulevard Adolphe-Chapleau)
- Reconstruction of the Autoroute 640 / Route 335 interchange
- Construction of a new bridge located east of the Athanase David Bridge over the Rivière des Mille Îles
- Repair of the current Athanase David bridge

== 2006 Highway Overpass collapse ==
On September 30, 2006, at 12:30PM EDT, an overpass on Boulevard de la Concorde (Exit 5) collapsed onto the busy Autoroute 19 in Laval. Two vehicles were crushed underneath, while three others and a motorcycle fell from the top. Five people were killed and six others were injured, including three critically. There have been numerous reports from witnesses who saw the two vehicles being crushed underneath the structure. The overpass bridge, built in 1970, had been rated for 35 more years of service and had a maintenance check one year earlier, in 2005. The police called Transports Quebec to report fallen chunks of concrete one hour before the collapse, and a Transports Quebec team had visually inspected the span less than thirty minutes prior to the collapse. The section between Autoroute 440 and Boulevard Levesque was reopened four weeks later. An estimated 60 000 motorists use the highway and connected bridge to the Island of Montreal daily. Traffic and bus re-routing as well as park-and-ride measures were being managed by Transports Quebec (see external link below). In light of the incident, the Quebec government announced a public investigation headed by former premier Pierre-Marc Johnson into the matter. The remainder of the structure was demolished on October 21 after further inspection of the remains. A nearby overpass was also ordered to be demolished due to structural concerns.

The replacement overpass for Boulevard de la Concorde opened to traffic on June 13, 2007.

== Exit list ==
RCM	Location	km	mi	Exit	Destinations	Notes
Montreal	Montreal	0.0	0.0		A-40 (TCH) (Autoroute Métropolitaine) / Avenue Papineau	Traffic circle with Boulevard Crémazie (service roads); A-40 exit 75; former southern extent of A-19 signage (not officially part of A-19)
Montreal	Montreal	3.0	1.9	–	Boulevard Henri-Bourassa	A-19 southern terminus; at-grade intersection with no left turns
Rivière des Prairies		4.1– 4.6	2.5– 2.9	Pont Papineau-Leblanc (Papineau-Leblanc Bridge)		
Laval		4.7	2.9	4	Boulevard Lévesque	Northbound exit and southbound entrance
Laval		5.4	3.4	5	Boulevard de la Concorde	
Laval		7.1	4.4	7	Boulevard Saint-Martin	Former R-148
Laval		8.4	5.2	8	A-440 (Autoroute Laval) / R-335 south	A-440 exit 27; south end of R-335 concurrency
Laval		10.1	6.3	10	R-335 north / Boulevard Dagenais Est / Boulevard des Grands-Maîtres	A-19 northern terminus; at-grade intersection; R-335 (Avenue Papineau) continues north; future interchange as part of A-19 extension
Laval		13.5	8.4	13	Rue Saint-Saëns Est	Interchange under construction as part of A-19 extension (phase 1)
Laval		15.3	9.5	15	Boulevard des Laurentides / Boulevard des Mille-Îles	Future interchange as part of A-19 extension
Rivière des Mille Îles		15.9– 16.2	9.9– 10.1	Pont Athanase-David (Athanase David Bridge)		
Thérèse-De Blainville	Bois-des-Filion	16.7	10.4	16	R-344 (Boulevard Adolphe-Chapleau) – Rosemère, Terrebonne	Future interchange as part of A-19 extension
Thérèse-De Blainville	Bois-des-Filion	17.6	10.9	17	A-640 – Repentigny, Saint-Eustache R-335 north – Sainte-Anne-des-Plaines	A-640 exit 28; future A-19 northern terminus
1.000 mi = 1.609 km; 1.000 km = 0.621 mi: Closed/former; Concurrency terminus; Incomplete access; Unopened

== See also ==
- List of bridges spanning the Rivière des Prairies
- List of crossings of the Rivière des Mille Îles
- List of crossings of the Rivière des Prairies
