= Quebec Route 136 =

Quebec Route 136 may refer to:

- Quebec Route 136 (Montreal)
- Quebec Route 136 (Quebec City)
