= Quebec Autoroute 10 =

Highway in Quebec

Autoroute 10
- Autoroute Bonaventure; Autoroute des Cantons-de-l'Est

Route information
- Maintained by Transports Québec
- Length: 145.1 km (90.2 mi)
- Existed: 1962–present

Major junctions
- West end: R-136 in Montréal
- A-15 / A-20 from Montréal to Brossard; A-30 in Brossard; A-35 in Chambly; A-55 in Magog; A-410 in Sherbrooke; A-55 in Sherbrooke
- East end: A-55 / A-610 in Sherbrooke

Location
- Country: Canada
- Province: Quebec
- Major cities: Montreal, Brossard, Chambly, Granby, Sherbrooke

Highway system
- Quebec provincial highways; Autoroutes; List; Former
← A-5	→ A-13

Autoroute 10 (A-10) is an Autoroute of Quebec in Canada that links greater Montreal to key population centres in Montérégie and Estrie, including Brossard, Saint-Jean-sur-Richelieu, Granby and Sherbrooke.

The A-10 also provides access to popular winter resorts at Bromont, Owl's Head, Mont Sutton and Mont Orford. Motorists travelling on the A-10 can see eight of nine Monteregian Hills: Mount Royal, Mont Saint-Bruno, Mont Saint-Hilaire, Mont Saint-Grégoire, Mont Rougemont, Mont Yamaska, Mont Shefford and Mont Brome. The ninth, Mont Mégantic is located beyond the eastern terminus of the autoroute.

== Description ==
The A-10 carries the name Autoroute Bonaventure (Bonaventure Expressway) from its start in Montreal's city centre to the Champlain Bridge. From there until its terminus in Sherbrooke, the A-10 is called the Autoroute des Cantons-de-l'Est (Eastern Townships Expressway), a reference to the historic name given to the region east of Montreal and north of the U.S. border.

The road's main material is asphalt concrete, many parts of the highway are bordered with gravel.

=== Autoroute Bonaventure ===
The autoroute begins in Downtown Montreal as an extension of Robert-Bourassa Boulevard near Place Bonaventure. Two underground ramps provide an interchange with the R-136, the Ville-Marie Autoroute. At km 1, the highway crosses the Lachine Canal. At km 2, it crosses under, but does not provide access to, Route 112 at the north end of Victoria Bridge. From there, the highway travels along the St. Lawrence River to an interchange with A-15 and A-20. This interchange is partially on the Island of Montreal and partially on Nuns' Island. A-10 is multiplexed with the A-15 and A-20 across the Champlain Bridge. All three autoroutes diverge soon after reaching the southern edge of the bridge.

The autoroute serves as an important link for commuters travelling to downtown Montreal from suburban South Shore communities via the Champlain Bridge. It also provides access to the Montreal Technoparc and the Concordia Bridge. Within the city limits of Montreal the autoroute is jointly owned by the city of Montreal, Ponts Jacques Cartier et Champlain Incorporée (PJCCI), a federal crown corporation that owns and operates the three major highway bridges over the Saint Lawrence River to the south of Montréal.

Autoroute 10 is at least two lanes in each direction for the majority of its length and the speed limit is usually 100 km/h.

=== Autoroute des Cantons de l'Est ===
At km 8, the A-10 crosses Taschereau Boulevard. Bus lanes run in both directions along the median for four kilometers between the southern end of the Champlain Bridge and Milan Boulevard. Crossing Brossard, the A-10 runs along the northern edge of the Quartier DIX30 shopping complex before reaching interchanges with the A-30 at km 11 and the A-35 at km 22. The A-10 crosses the Richelieu River at km 28 and enters a rich agricultural region.

Between Bromont (km 74) and Magog (km 121) the A-10 passes through a mountainous region, close to two of Quebec's major ski centres (Mont Orford and Mont Brome). Near the northern end of Lake Memphremagog, the A-10 reaches an interchange with the A-55 at km 121. The A-10 continues east as a concurrency with A-55. Between km 123 and 128, Route 112 functions as a frontage road.

A-10 and A-55 bypass the city of Sherbrooke to the east and north, reaching interchanges with spur routes A-410 at km 140 and A-610 at km 143. The A-10 reaches its terminus at the junction with A-610, while A-55 continues north to Drummondville.

The portion east of Autoroute 55 (linking that autoroute with Route 112) was renumbered as Autoroute 610 on September 29, 2006.

== History ==
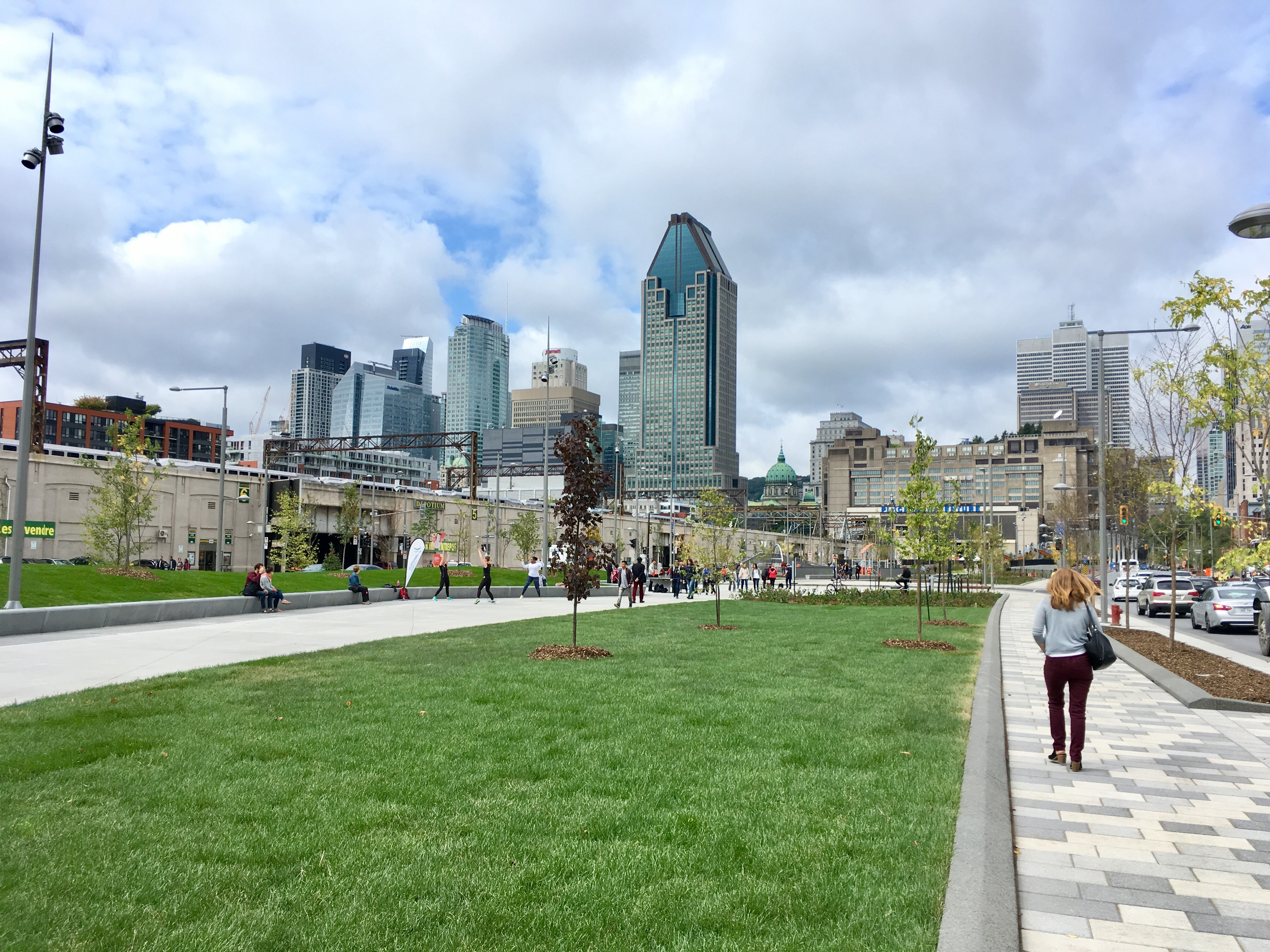
The new Bonaventure Park which replaced the elevated structure in Downtown Montréal.

The 116 km (72 mi) long Autoroute de l'Est (Eastern Expressway) was opened to traffic in December 1964. Extending from the southern end of the Champlain Bridge to Magog, the highway replaced the old Quebec Route 1 (now Route 112) as the main road link between the two points. An official opening for the highway came one year later, in 1965. The A-10 was the second autoroute, after the Laurentian Autoroute outside Montreal, to be commissioned. Both were opened as toll highways by a Quebec government agency. The A-10 featured five toll stations (at current km 22, km 37, km 68, km 90, and km 115). Motorists were charged $1.50 to make the entire trip.

The Autoroute Bonaventure through Montreal opened in 1967 to link approach roads to Expo 67 with the Champlain Bridge.

The Autoroute des Cantons de l'Est was the first autoroute in Quebec to use exit numbers based on distance instead of in sequential order, as had previously been the case. As Canada had not yet adopted the metric system, exit numbers referenced the distance in miles from the southern end of the Champlain Bridge.

The A-10 did not originally have a route number. Instead, route marker signs featured a red triangular shield featuring the name of the route. Unusually, the directional signs were also originally red. Later, blue shields and signs replaced the red versions.

In 1985, the toll system was abolished, and the use of the triangular shields was discontinued. Blue directional signs have gradually been converted to standard green signs used elsewhere in North America. In 2013, motorists could still see blue signs at entrances to and exits of the autoroute.

Between 1988 and 2006, A-10 departed its multiplex with A-55 at km 143 and continued eastward for 11 km to a final terminus with Route 112. In October 2006, that section of A-10 was renumbered as A-610.

The city of Montreal announced in January 2013 that it would take over the SHM's responsibilities, citing concerns over transparency. The Société du Havre de Montréal (SHM) transformed the autoroute into an urban thoroughfare as part of a broader project to redevelop Montreal's harbourfront. Demolition of the autoroute’s elevated stretch began in July 2016 and the new Bonaventure Park was completed in September 2017.

== Proposal ==
A proposal to build the East-West Highway across central and northern Maine calls for the A-10 to be extended to the U.S. border at Coburn Gore where it would meet the new highway. Doing so would create a new and more direct limited-access highway link between Maine, the Maritime Provinces through New Brunswick Route 1, and Quebec. Another proposal is to extend the A-10 to A-73 Saint-Georges with a crossing of A-65 in Lambton according to the 1971 plans.

== Exit list ==
RCM	Location	km	mi	Old exit	New exit	Destinations	Notes
Montréal	Montréal	0.00	0.00		–	R-136 east (Autoroute Ville-Marie)	R-136 exit 5; no access to R-136 West
Montréal	Montréal	0.80	0.50		–	Boulevard Robert-Bourassa	Westbound exit and eastbound entrance
Montréal	Montréal					To R-112 east / Rue Wellington – Pont Victoria	At-grade
Montréal	Montréal	2.12	1.32		2	Avenue Pierre-Dupuy / Rue Carrie-Derick–Port de Montréal	
Montréal	Montréal	2.75	1.71		3	Rue Carrie-Derick	Westbound exit is via exit 2
Montréal	Montréal	4.01– 4.62	2.49– 2.87		5	Île des Sœurs	Eastbound exit and westbound entrance
Montréal	Montréal	4.01– 4.62	2.49– 2.87		58	A-15 north / A-20 west (Autoroute Décarie) / Île des Sœurs – Saint-Jérôme, Toronto, Aéroport P.-E.-Trudeau, Aéroport Mirabel	Westbound exit and eastbound entrance; west end of end of A-15 / A-20 concurrency; exit 58 on A-15 / A-20
St. Lawrence River				Pont Champlain			
Longueuil	Brossard	6.12	3.80		6	A-15 south / A-20 east / R-132 to I-87 – Longueuil, Varennes, New York	East end of end of A-15 / A-20 concurrency; exit 53 on A-15 north; exit 75 on A-20 west
Longueuil	Brossard	8.47	5.26	1	8	R-134 (Boulevard Taschereau) – Longueuil, La Prairie	Taschereau Interchange
Longueuil	Brossard	8.90	5.53		9	Boulevard Milan	No westbound exit
Longueuil	Brossard	12.21	7.59		11	A-30 (Autoroute de l'Acier) to A-20 east – Sorel-Tracy, Vaudreuil-Dorion, Québec, Aéroport Saint-Hubert	Eastbound exit also serves Boulevard de Quartier; exit 67 on A-30
Longueuil	Brossard				13	Boulevard Rome	Westbound exit, eastbound entrance Brossard station
La Vallée-du-Richelieu	Carignan – Chambly boundary	22.44	13.94	9	22	A-35 south to I-89 – Chambly, Saint-Jean-sur-Richelieu, Vermont	Exit 55 on A-35
Richelieu River				Pont Michel-Chartrand			
Rouville	Richelieu	28.44	17.67	13	29	R-133 (Chemin des Patriotes) – Richelieu	
Rouville	Marieville	36.62	22.75	18	37	R-227 – Marieville, Mont-Saint-Grégoire, Sainte-Angèle-de-Monnoir	
Le Haut-Richelieu	Sainte-Brigide-d'Iberville	47.93	29.78	25	48	R-233 – Saint-Césaire, Rougemont, Sainte-Brigide-d'Iberville	
Rouville	Ange-Gardien	55.06	34.21	30	55	R-235 – Saint-Paul-d'Abbotsford, Ange-Gardien, Farnham	
La Haute-Yamaska	Saint-Alphonse-de-Granby	67.56	41.98	37	68	R-139 (Boulevard David-Bouchard) – Saint-Alphonse-de-Granby, Sutton, Cowansville	
La Haute-Yamaska–Brome-Missisquoi	Granby – Bromont boundary	73.81	45.86	41	74	Route Pierre-Laporte–Centre-Ville Granby	
La Haute-Yamaska	Bromont	78.66	48.88	44	78	Boulevard de Bromont–Shefford	
La Haute-Yamaska	Shefford – Waterloo boundary	88.03	54.70		88	Boulevard de l'Horizon	
La Haute-Yamaska	Shefford – Waterloo boundary	90.20	56.05	52	90	R-243 – Waterloo, Valcourt, Sutton, Lac-Brome	
Brome-Missisquoi	No major junctions						
Memphrémagog	Saint-Étienne-de-Bolton	100.09	62.19	58	100	Stukely-Sud, Saint-Étienne-de-Bolton	Via R-112
Memphrémagog	Eastman	105.25	65.40	61	106	R-245 – Eastman, Potton, Bolton-Est	
Memphrémagog	Magog	113.79	70.71	67	115	R-112 (Rue Principale) – Centre-Ville Magog, Saint-Benoît-du-Lac	Memphrémagog Service Centre
Memphrémagog	Magog	118.06	73.36		118	R-141 (Rue Merry) – Orford	
Memphrémagog	Magog	120.32	74.76	71	121	A-55 south (Autoroute Bombardier) to I-91 – Coaticook, Stanstead, Vermont	Western terminus of concurrency with A-55; exit 34 on A-55
Memphrémagog–Sherbrooke	Magog – Sherbrooke boundary	123.92	77.00	72; 36	123	R-112 to R-249 – Centre-Ville Magog, Saint-Denis-de-Brompton	
Sherbrooke		127.68	79.34	41	128	R-112 (Boulevard Bourque)	
Sherbrooke		133.68	83.06	46	133	Chemin Saint-Roch Nord	
Sherbrooke		136.00	84.51	Catherine-Day Truck Stop (Eastbound)			
Sherbrooke		137.22	85.26	50	137	R-220 (Boulevard Industriel) / Chemin de Saint-Élie	
Sherbrooke		140.59	87.36	54	140	A-410 east (Autoroute Jacques-O'Bready) to R-108 / Rue King	Western terminus of A-410
Sherbrooke		141.58	87.97	55	141	Boulevard de Monseigneur-Fortier	
Sherbrooke		143.33	89.06		143	A-610 east (Autoroute Louis-Bilodeau) to R-112 – Centre-Ville Sherbrooke, East Angus, Lac-Mégantic	Western terminus of A-610
Sherbrooke		143.33	89.06		–	A-55 north (Autoroute Bombardier) – Drummondville, Québec	Eastern terminus of concurrency with A-55
1.000 mi = 1.609 km; 1.000 km = 0.621 mi: Concurrency terminus; Incomplete access
