= Quebec Route 112 =

Highway in Quebec

Route 112

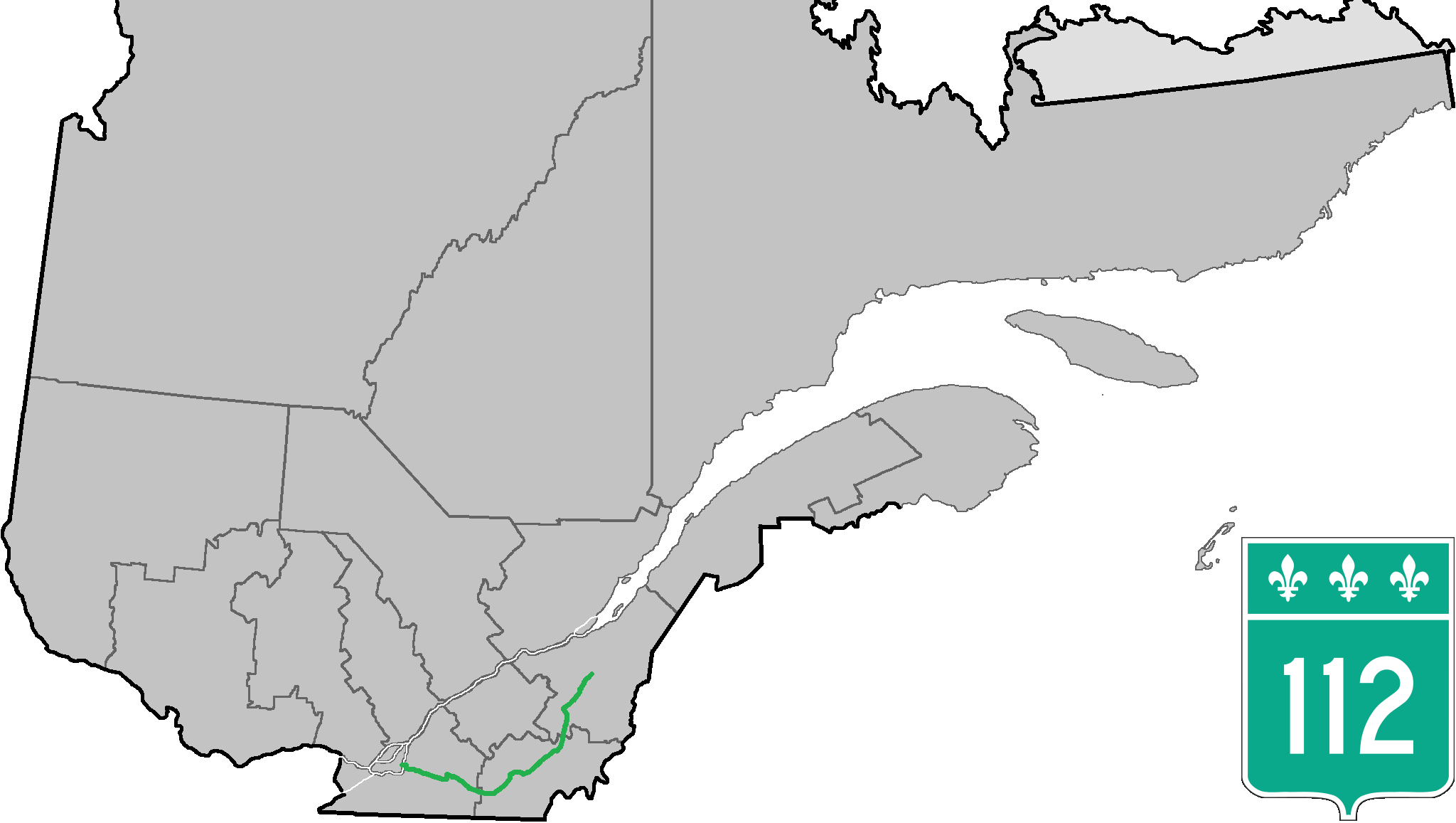

Route information
- Maintained by Transports Québec
- Length: 319.0 km (198.2 mi)
- History: Route 1 (Saint-Hubert – Vallée-Jonction)

Major junctions
- West end: R-138 in Montreal
- A-20 / R-132 in Saint-Lambert; A-30 / R-116 / R-134 in Longueuil; R-133 in Richelieu; R-137 / R-139 in Granby; A-10 / A-55 / R-108 / R-141 in Magog; A-10 / A-55 in Sherbrooke; A-410 / A-610 / R-143 in Sherbrooke; R-161 in Weedon and Beaulac-Garthby; R-173 in Vallée-Jonction; A-73 in Saints-Anges
- East end: R-275 in Frampton

Location
- Country: Canada
- Province: Quebec
- Major cities: Montréal, Longueuil, Sherbrooke

Highway system
- Quebec provincial highways; Autoroutes; List; Former
← R-111	→ R-113

Route 112 is a busy east–west highway on the south shore of the Saint Lawrence River in Quebec, Canada. Its eastern terminus is in Frampton at the junction of Route 275, and the western terminus is in Downtown Montreal (at the corner of Peel Street and Sherbrooke Street), after crossing the Victoria Bridge. The stretch between Vallée-Jonction and Sherbrooke is a very busy highway as it is the main link between the southern regions of Quebec, in particular the Beauce region and the Eastern Townships. Between Sherbrooke and Marieville there is less traffic, since Autoroute 10 is in close proximity to the highway. (Before Autoroute 10 was put in service in the early 1960s, Route 1 (now Route 112) was the main link between Montreal and the Eastern Townships; see paragraph below.) From Marieville to Montreal it is a very busy highway, in most parts a four-lane separated highway, upgraded to freeway standards in certain places.

Route 112 is Granby's main street (rue Principale), Magog's main street (rue Principale), and Sherbrooke's main street (rue King). It has been the road connecting most of the Eastern Townships to Montreal for decades as Route 1.

== Municipalities along Route 112 ==
- Montreal
- Saint-Lambert
- Longueuil
- Carignan
- Chambly
- Richelieu
- Marieville
- Rougemont
- Saint-Césaire
- Saint-Paul-d'Abbotsford
- Granby
- Shefford
- Waterloo
- Stukely-Sud
- Saint-Étienne-de-Bolton
- Eastman
- Austin
- Magog
- Sherbrooke
- Ascot Corner
- Westbury
- East Angus
- Dudswell
- Weedon
- Beaulac-Garthby
- Disraeli (parish)
- Disraeli (city)
- Saint-Joseph-de-Coleraine
- Thetford Mines
- Saint-Pierre-de-Broughton
- Sacré-Coeur-de-Jésus
- East Broughton
- Tring-Jonction
- Saint-Frédéric
- Vallée-Jonction
- Saints-Anges
- Frampton

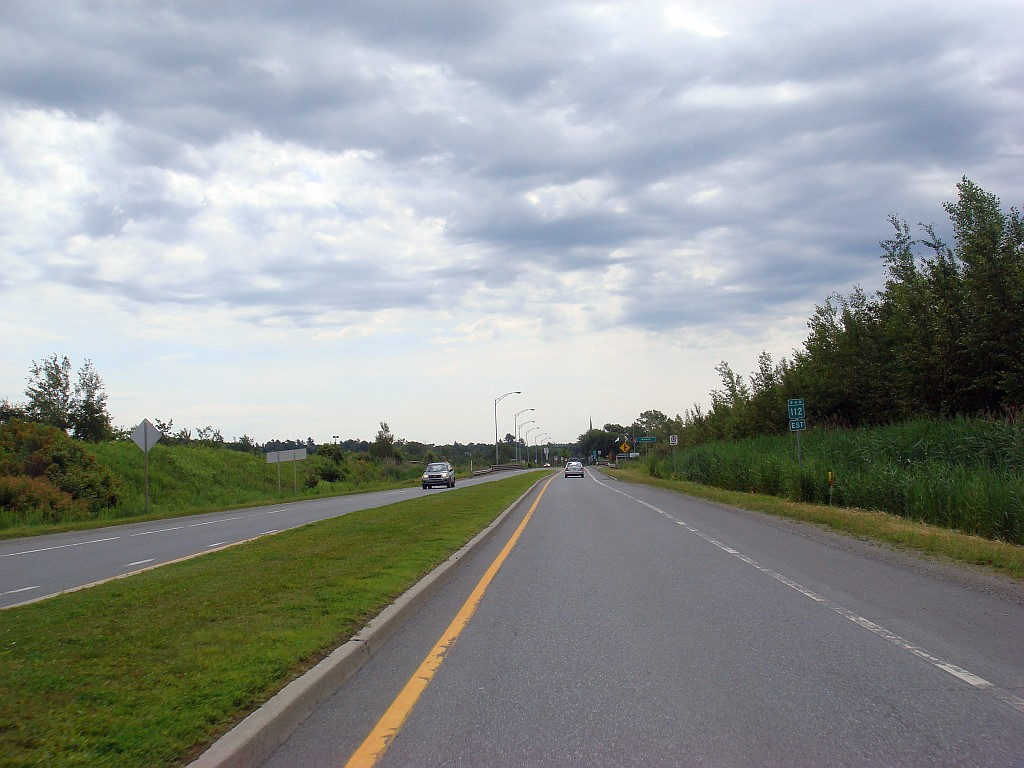
Route 112 near Magog, Quebec

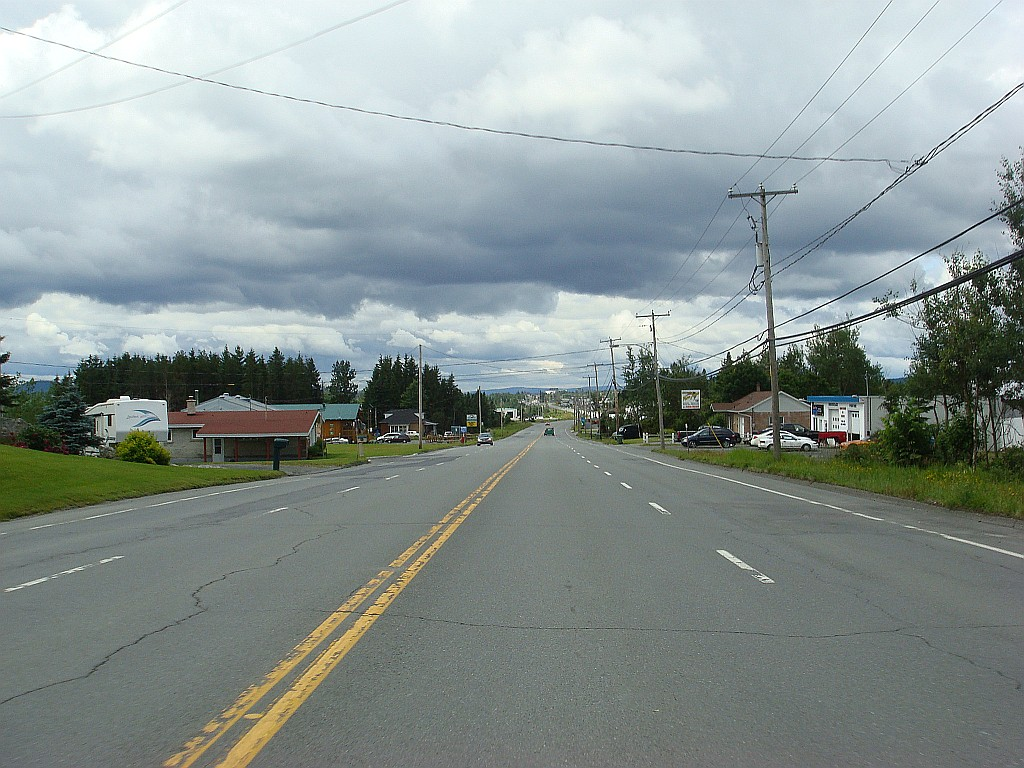
Route 112 near Thetford Mines

== Major intersections ==
RCM	Location	km	mi	Exit	Destinations	Notes
Montreal	Montreal	0.0	0.0		Rue Sherbrooke (R-138) / Rue Peel	R-112 western terminus and follows Rue Peel; R-112 is unsigned
Montreal	Montreal	0.6	0.37		Boulevard René-Lévesque	
Montreal	Montreal	0.9	0.56		To R-136 west / Rue Saint-Antoine	
Montreal	Montreal	1.8	1.1		Rue Wellington / Rue Peel	R-112 follows Rue Wellington; to A-10 east
Montreal	Montreal	2.2	1.4	Crosses Canal de Lachine		
Montreal	Montreal	2.5	1.6		Rue Bridge / Rue Wellington	R-112 follows Rue Bridge
St. Lawrence River		3.8– 6.2	2.4– 3.9	Pont Victoria (Victoria Bridge)		
Longueuil	Saint-Lambert	6.4	4.0		R-132 / A-20 – Varennes, La Prairie, U.S.A.	A-20 exit 78; R-112 is signed east of A-20 / R-132
Longueuil	Saint-Lambert	7.5	4.7		Avenue Victoria	
Longueuil	Longueuil	8.8	5.5	1	R-134 (Boulevard Taschereau) / R-116 begins – La Prairie, Pont Champlain, Pont Jacques-Cartier	Interchange; R-116 western terminus; west end of R-116 concurrency; exit numbers follow R-116
Longueuil	Longueuil	10.2– 10.8	6.3– 6.7	2	Boulevard Édouard	Interchange
Longueuil	Longueuil	13.3	8.3	4	Chemin de Chambly / Boulevard Cousineau – Saint-Hubert Airport R-116 east (Boulevard Sir-Wilfrid-Laurier) – Beloeil, Saint-Hyacinthe	Interchange; east end of R-116 concurrency; R-112 follows Boulevard Cousineau
Longueuil	Longueuil	18.2	11.3		A-30 – Sorel-Tracy, Vaudreuil-Dorion	A-30 exit 73
La Vallée-du-Richelieu	Carignan	24.8	15.4		R-223 north – Beloeil	West end of R-223 concurrency
La Vallée-du-Richelieu	Chambly	27.1	16.8		Boulevard Fréchette	To A-35
La Vallée-du-Richelieu	Chambly	29.5	18.3		R-223 south – Saint-Jean-sur-Richelieu	Interchange; east end of R-223 concurrency
Rouville	Richelieu	30.6	19.0		R-133 to A-10 – Saint-Mathias-sur-Richelieu, Saint-Jean-sur-Richelieu	
Rouville	Marieville	37.0	23.0		R-227 to A-10 – Saint-Jean-Baptiste, Marieville Centre-Ville, Mont-Saint-Grégoire	
Rouville	Rougemont	43.7	27.2		R-229 north – Rougemont, Saint-Jean-Baptiste	
Rouville	Rougemont	46.5	28.9		R-231 north – Saint-Damase, Saint-Hyacinthe	
Rouville	Saint-Césaire	51.2	31.8		R-233 to A-10 – Sainte-Brigide-d'Iberville, Farnham, Saint-Hyacinthe	
Rouville	Saint-Paul-d'Abbotsford	58.3	36.2		R-235 to A-10 – Ange-Gardien, Saint-Pie	
La Haute-Yamaska	Granby	68.9	42.8		R-137 north – Sainte-Cecile-de-Milton, Saint-Hyacinthe	
La Haute-Yamaska	Granby	71.0	44.1		R-139 to A-10 – Roxton Pond, Cowansville	Interchange
La Haute-Yamaska	Waterloo	93.3	58.0		R-241 north / R-243 north – Roxton Falls, Valcourt	West end of R-241 / R-243 concurrency
La Haute-Yamaska	Waterloo	94.2	58.5		R-241 south – Bromont, Cowansville	East end of R-241 concurrency
La Haute-Yamaska	Shefford	96.0	59.7		R-243 south to A-10 – Lac-Brome	East end of R-243 concurrency
Memphrémagog	Saint-Étienne-de-Bolton	106.7	66.3		To A-10 – Saint-Étienne-de-Bolton	A-10 exit 100
Memphrémagog	Eastman	112.0	69.6		R-245 south to A-10 – Bolton-Est, Potton	
Memphrémagog	Magog	121.3– 121.7	75.4– 75.6		R-141 south – Orford; A-10 – Sherbrooke, Montreal	A-10 exit 115; R-141 signed as south but heads north (circular route)
Memphrémagog	Magog	126.7	78.7		R-141 (Rue Merry) to R-247	
Memphrémagog	Magog	127.4	79.2		R-108 east (Rue Princeipale) – Sainte-Catherine-de-Hatley	
Memphrémagog	Magog	130.7	81.2		A-55 to A-10 – Sherbrooke, Montreal, Stanstead	A-55 exit 33
Memphrémagog	Magog	132.8	82.5		A-10 west / A-55 south – Montreal, Stanstead	A-10 exit 123; no eastbound exit to A-10 west / A-55 south; west end of A-10 / A-55 concurrency; R-112 follows A-10 / A-55 service roads
Sherbrooke		133.8	83.1		R-249 north – Saint-Denis-de-Brompton	A-10 exit 123
Sherbrooke		137.0	85.1		A-10 east / A-55 north – Sherbrooke, Drummondville	A-10 exit 128; east end of A-10 / A-55 concurrency
Sherbrooke		148.0	92.0		A-410 to A-10 / A-55 – Montreal, Drummondville, Cookshire-Eaton	A-410 exit 4
Sherbrooke		150.6	93.6		Boulevard Jacques-Cartier	Access to Université de Sherbrooke and R-216 south
Sherbrooke		153.8	95.6		Rue des Grandes-Fourches (R-143)	
Sherbrooke		155.4– 155.5	96.6– 96.6		12^{e} Avenue / 13^{e} Avenue (R-216)	One-way pair
Sherbrooke		160.4	99.7		A-610 to A-10 / A-55 – Montreal, Drummondville	Roundabout; A-610 eastern terminus
Le Haut-Saint-François	East Angus	172.7	107.3		R-214 east / R-253 south – East Angus, Cookshire-Eaton, Lac-Mégantic	
Le Haut-Saint-François	East Angus	175.4	109.0		Rue Saint-Jean	Partially grade-separated
Le Haut-Saint-François	Dudswell	188.1	116.9		R-255 – Val-des-Sources, Dudswell	
Le Haut-Saint-François	Weedon	204.9	127.3		R-257 south – Lingwick, Weedon	West end of R-257 concurrency
Le Haut-Saint-François	Weedon	205.9	127.9		R-257 north – Ham-Sud	East end of R-257 concurrency
Le Haut-Saint-François	Weedon	213.0	132.4		R-161 south – Lac-Mégantic	West end of R-161 concurrency
Les Appalaches	Beaulac-Garthby	220.4	137.0		R-161 north – Victoriaville	East end of R-161 concurrency
Les Appalaches	Disraeli	230.2	143.0		R-263 north – Saint-Jacques-le-Majeur-de-Wolfestown, Saint-Fortunat	West end of R-263 concurrency
Les Appalaches	Disraeli	231.1	143.6		R-263 south – Sainte-Praxède, Lambton, Grand lac Saint François	East end of R-263 concurrency
Les Appalaches	Thetford Mines	251.0	156.0		R-165 north (Rue Saint-Désiré) – Saint-Ferdinand, Plessisville	
Les Appalaches	Thetford Mines	258.8	160.8		R-267 (Rue Saint-Alphonse) – Saint-Jean-de-Brébeuf, Centre-Ville, Adstock	
Les Appalaches	Thetford Mines	266.2	165.4		R-269 north (Rue Poirier) – Thetford Mines, Saint-Agapit	West end of R-269 concurrency
Les Appalaches	Thetford Mines	267.8	166.4		R-269 south (Rue Saint-Georges) – Adstock	East end of R-269 concurrency
Les Appalaches	Thetford Mines–Saint-Pierre-de-Broughton boundary	273.8	170.1		R-271 north – Saint-Pierre-de-Broughton, Saint-Jacques-de-Leeds	West end of R-271 concurrency
Les Appalaches	Sacré-Cœur-de-Jésus	278.5	173.1		R-271 south – Sainte-Clotilde-de-Beauce, Saint-Éphrem-de-Beauce	East end of R-271 concurrency
Beauce-Centre	Saint-Frédéric	295.7	183.7		R-276 east – Saint-Joseph-de-Beauce	
La Nouvelle-Beauce	Vallée-Jonction	305.5	189.8		R-173 south (Rue Principale) – Saint-Georges	West end of R-173 concurrency
La Nouvelle-Beauce	Vallée-Jonction	305.8	190.0		R-173 north – Lévis	East end of R-173 concurrency
La Nouvelle-Beauce	Vallée-Jonction–Saints-Anges boundary	308.4	191.6		A-73 – Québec, Saint-Georges	A-73 exit 81
La Nouvelle-Beauce	Frampton	319.7	198.7		R-275 – Saint-Malachie, Sainte-Marguerite, Saint-Odilon-de-Cranbourne	R-112 eastern terminus
1.000 mi = 1.609 km; 1.000 km = 0.621 mi: Concurrency terminus; Incomplete access

== See also ==
- List of Quebec provincial highways
