= Quebec Autoroute 410 =

Highway in Quebec

Autoroute 410
- Autoroute Jacques-O'Bready
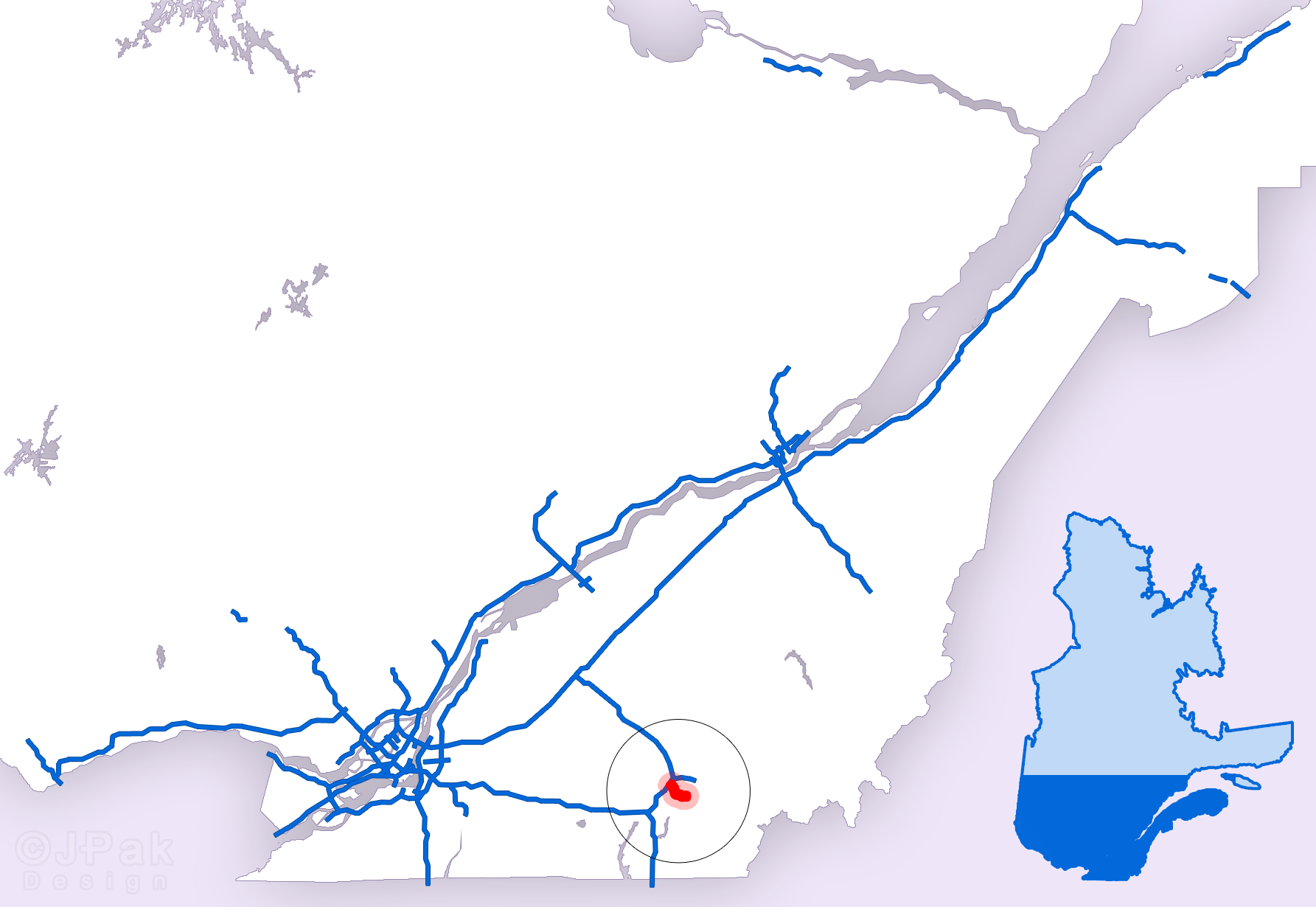

Route information
- Maintained by Transports Québec
- Length: 16.9 km (10.5 mi)
- Existed: 1971–present

Major junctions
- South end: R-108 / R-143 in Sherbrooke
- R-112 in Sherbrooke
- North end: A-10 / A-55 in Sherbrooke

Location
- Country: Canada
- Province: Quebec
- Major cities: Sherbrooke, Hatley

Highway system
- Quebec provincial highways; Autoroutes; List; Former
← R-399	→ A-440

Autoroute 410 (or A-410) is a short peri-urban multilane highway in Sherbrooke, Quebec. It is currently a branch from Autoroute 10 (Autoroute des Cantons-de-l'Est) to its terminus east of Lennoxville. The road was named for Jacques O'Bready, the former mayor of Sherbrooke and president of the Commission municipale du Québec, in March 2007. Before then, the road was known as the Autoroute University.

== History ==
The initial segment was opened from A-10 to Boulevard Bourque (Route 112) in 1971 as a two-lane freeway. The route was opened to Boulevard de l'Université in 1978, and the entire A-410 became a 4-lane divided highway in 1981.

In May 2009, work started on Phase 1 of the A-410 extension to Lennoxville. An interchange was built over Boulevard de l'Université, another over Belvédère Street, south of Mont-Bellevue and the last one at R-108/R-143 south of Lennoxville. The project was expected to be completed in 2014. Due to delays, the Belvédère Street interchange was opened in November 2014, with the 108/143 interchange opened in November 2015.

Construction of Phase 2, which started in summer 2018 and opened to traffic in December 2020, bypasses Lennoxville, with a bridge built over the Massawippi river and culminating at R-108 near Glenday Road, Alexander Galt Regional High School and the Dairy and Swine Research and Development Centre. This phase completes the southern bypass road for Sherbrooke, mirroring the role of A-610 as northern bypass.

== Exit list ==
RCM	Location	km	mi	Exit	Destinations	Notes
Sherbrooke		0.00	0.00	–	A-10 / A-55 – Montréal, Drummondville, Québec	Exit 140 on A-10 and A-55
Sherbrooke		0.00	0.00	1	Boulevard de Monseigneur-Fortier	Northbound exit only; other movements via A-10 / A-55 exit 141
Sherbrooke		1.70	1.06	2	R-220 / Boulevard de Portland	
Sherbrooke		3.50	2.17	4	R-112 (Boulevard Bourque)	Formerly a cloverleaf (signed as exits 4O and 4E); rebuilt into a Parclo A-4
Sherbrooke		5.40	3.36	6	Boulevard de l'Université	
Sherbrooke		6.90	4.29	7	R-216 (Chemin de Sainte-Catherine) – Sainte-Catherine-de-Hatley	Shared ramp with exit 8
Sherbrooke		7.80	4.85	8	Dunant Street	Shared ramp with exit 7
Memphrémagog	Hatley	9.80	6.09	10	Rue Belvédère	Traffic circle ramps
Sherbrooke		12.90	8.02	13	R-108 west / R-143 (Rue Queen) – Coaticook, Stanstead	Traffic circle ramps; Western terminus of concurrency with R-108
Sherbrooke		16.40	10.19	16	Chemin Glenday	Westbound exit and eastbound entrance
Sherbrooke		16.70	10.38	-	R-108 east – Cookshire-Eaton	Eastern terminus of concurrency with R-108; Eastern terminus of A-410 at traffic circle
1.000 mi = 1.609 km; 1.000 km = 0.621 mi: Incomplete access
