= Marieville =

- City
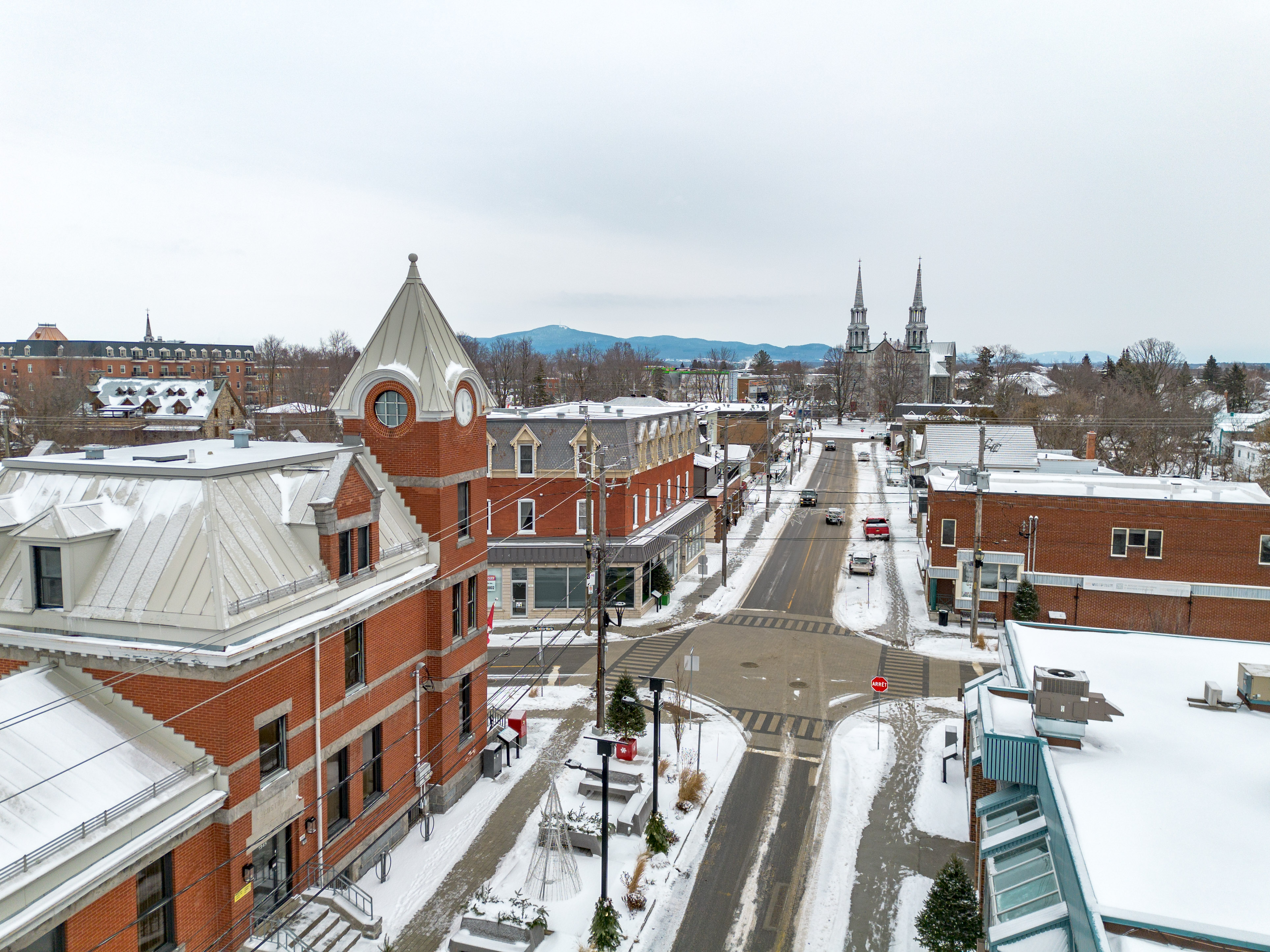
- Marieville in 2026

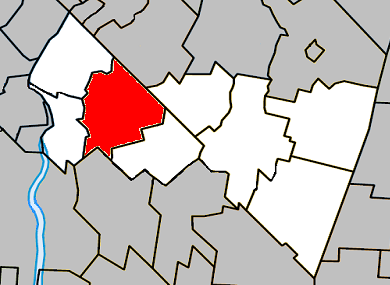
- Location within Rouville RCM

- Location in southern Quebec
- Coordinates: 45°26′N 73°10′W
- Country: Canada
- Province: Quebec
- Region: Montérégie
- RCM: Rouville
- Constituted: June 14, 2000

Government
  - Mayor: Vincent Després
  - Federal riding: Beloeil—Chambly
  - Prov. riding: Iberville

Area
  - Total: 62.90 km^{2} (24.29 sq mi)
  - Land: 63.23 km^{2} (24.41 sq mi)

Population (2021)
  - Total: 11,332
  - Density: 179.2/km^{2} (464/sq mi)
  - Pop 2016-2021: ▲5.7%
  - Dwellings: 4,776
- Time zone: UTC−05:00 (EST)
  - Summer (DST): UTC−04:00 (EDT)
- Postal code(s): J3M
- Area codes: 450 and 579
- Highways A-10: R-112; R-227
- Website: www.ville.marieville.qc.ca

Marieville (French pronunciation: [maʁivil]) is a city in the Canadian province of Quebec. It is located within the Rouville Regional County Municipality in the Montérégie region about 30 km (19 mi) east of Montreal. The population as of the Canada 2021 Census was 11,332.

== History ==
In 1708, Sieur Claude de Ramezey obtained a parcel of land which was named the Monnoir manor. Population increased starting at around 1740. It became a parish in 1832 and officially an incorporated municipality in 1858 and later an incorporated city in 1905. In 2000, the parish of Sainte-Marie-de-Monnoir, which previously demerged from Marieville in 1855 was re-merged. Its main economic activity today is still agriculture.

== Geography ==
Marieville is accessible via Quebec Autoroute 10, which runs from Montreal to Sherbrooke via Granby and Magog. Quebec Route 112 is a route that runs parallel to A-10 but through the municipality but continues north of Sherbrooke toward Thetford Mines. Quebec Route 227 is the secondary road that connects A-10 to the centre of Marieville and runs south towards Champlain Lake and north towards Quebec Autoroute 20 near Sainte-Madeleine.

== Demographics ==
In the 2021 Census of Population conducted by Statistics Canada, Marieville had a population of 11,332 living in 4,678 of its 4,776 total private dwellings, a change of 5.7% from its 2016 population of 10,725. With a land area of 63.23 km^{2} (24.41 sq mi), it had a population density of 179.2/km^{2} (464.2/sq mi) in 2021.

Population trend

| Census | Population | Change (%) |
|---|---|---|
| 2021 | 11,332 | ▲5.7% |
| 2016 | 10,725 | ▲6.3% |
| 2011 | 10,094 | ▲27.7% |
| 2006 | 7,904 | ▲9.2% |
| 2001 | 7,240 | ▲31.4% |
| 1996 | 5,510 | ▲7.4% |
| 1991 | 5,128 | ▲4.4% |
| 1986 | 4,913 | ▲1.8% |
| 1981 | 4,824 | ▼0.6% |
| 1976 | 4,853 | ▲3.9% |
| 1971 | 4,670 | ▲6.9% |
| 1966 | 4,368 | ▲14.7% |
| 1961 | 3,809 | ▲9.5% |
| 1956 | 3,478 | ▲11.6% |
| 1951 | 3,117 | ▲30.2% |
| 1941 | 2,394 | ▲20.5% |
| 1931 | 1,986 | ▲13.6% |
| 1921 | 1,748 | ▲10.1% |
| 1911 | 1,587 | ▲21.5% |
| 1901 | 1,306 | ▲3.2% |
| 1891 | 1,266 | ▲26.7% |
| 1881 | 999 | ▲38.2% |
| 1871 | 723 | ▼5.0% |
| 1861 | 761 | N/A |

(+) Amalgamation with Parish of Sainte-Marie-de-Monnoir on June 14, 2000.

Mother tongue language (2021)

| Language | Population | Percent (%) |
|---|---|---|
| French only | 10,585 | 94.6% |
| English only | 190 | 1.7% |
| Both English and French | 115 | 1.0% |
| Other languages | 280 | 2.5% |

== Attractions ==
Marieville has its own Christmas Market. There were Christmas Markets since 2010. It also has its Public Market from June to October, since June 2012.

== Government ==
=== City Council ===
- Vincent Després, mayor.

== Education ==
The South Shore Protestant Regional School Board previously served the municipality.

== Notable people ==
- Thierry Larose, indie rock singer-songwriter
- Kevin Owens, WWE wrestler, was raised in Marieville

== See also ==
- List of cities in Quebec
- CIT Chambly-Richelieu-Carignan, which provides commuter and local bus services
