= Saints-Anges =

- Municipality
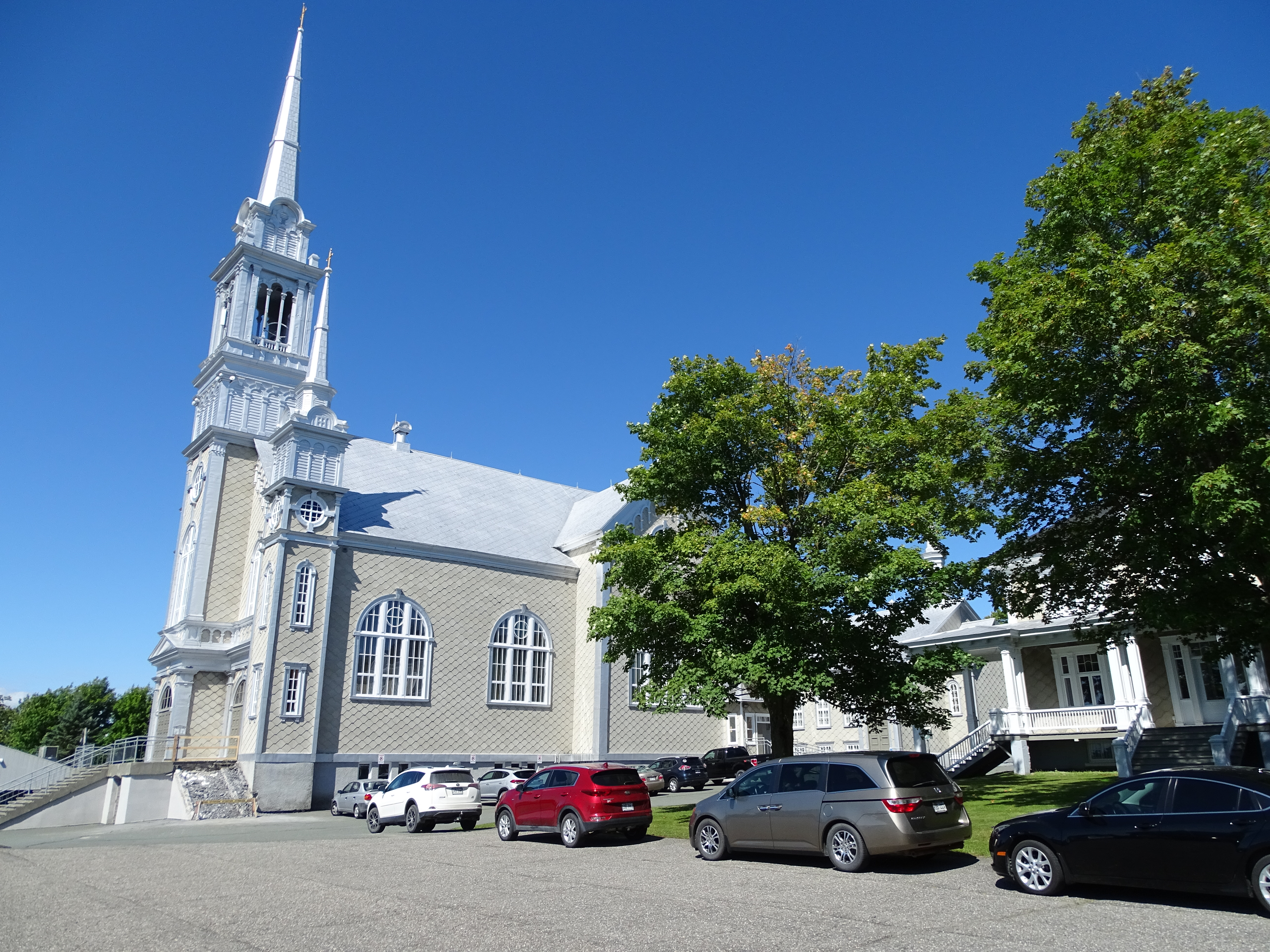
- Church of Saints-Anges

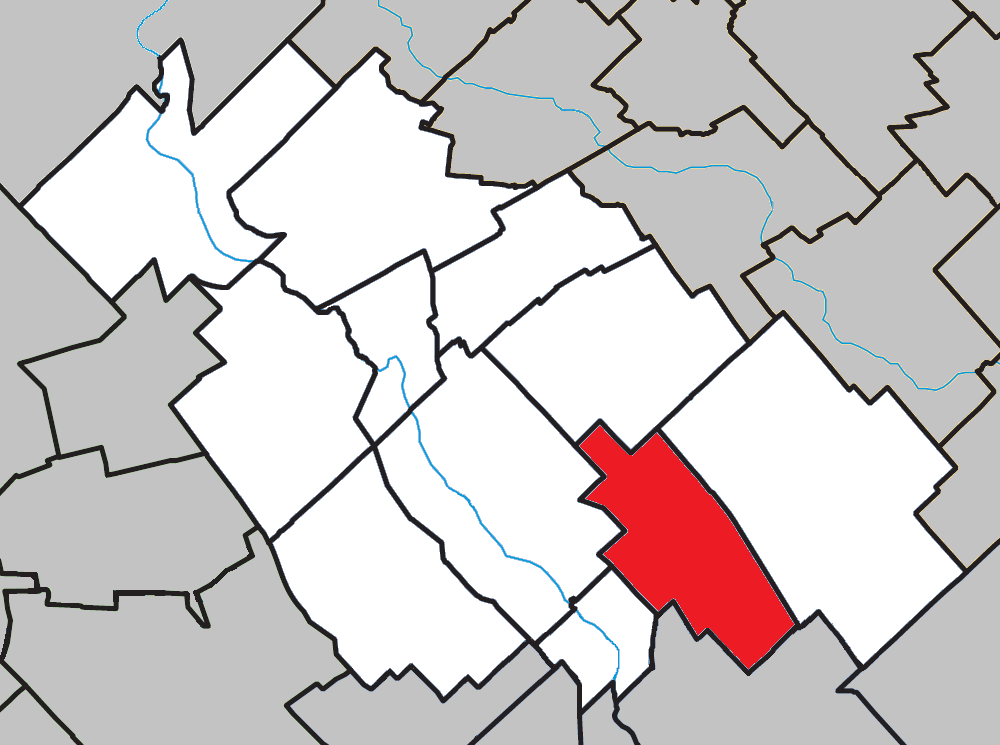
- Location within La Nouvelle-Beauce RCM.

- Location in southern Quebec.
- Coordinates: 46°25′N 70°53′W
- Country: Canada
- Province: Quebec
- Region: Chaudière-Appalaches
- RCM: La Nouvelle-Beauce
- Constituted: December 29, 1880

Government
  - Mayor: Carole Santerre
  - Federal riding: Beauce
  - Prov. riding: Beauce-Nord

Area
  - Total: 69.50 km^{2} (26.83 sq mi)
  - Land: 68.65 km^{2} (26.51 sq mi)

Population (2021)
  - Total: 1,239
  - Density: 18/km^{2} (47/sq mi)
  - Pop 2016-2021: ▲7.1%
  - Dwellings: 522
- Time zone: UTC−5 (EST)
  - Summer (DST): UTC−4 (EDT)
- Postal code(s): G0S 3E0
- Area codes: 418 and 581
- Highways A-73: R-112

Saints-Anges (French pronunciation: [sɛ̃z‿ɑ̃ʒ]) is a municipality in La Nouvelle-Beauce Regional County Municipality, in Quebec, Canada. It is part of the Chaudière-Appalaches region and had a population is 1,157 as of 2016.

The town was established in 1880, with part of the seigneurie of Sainte-Marie.
