= Quebec Route 134 =

Highway in Quebec

Route 134

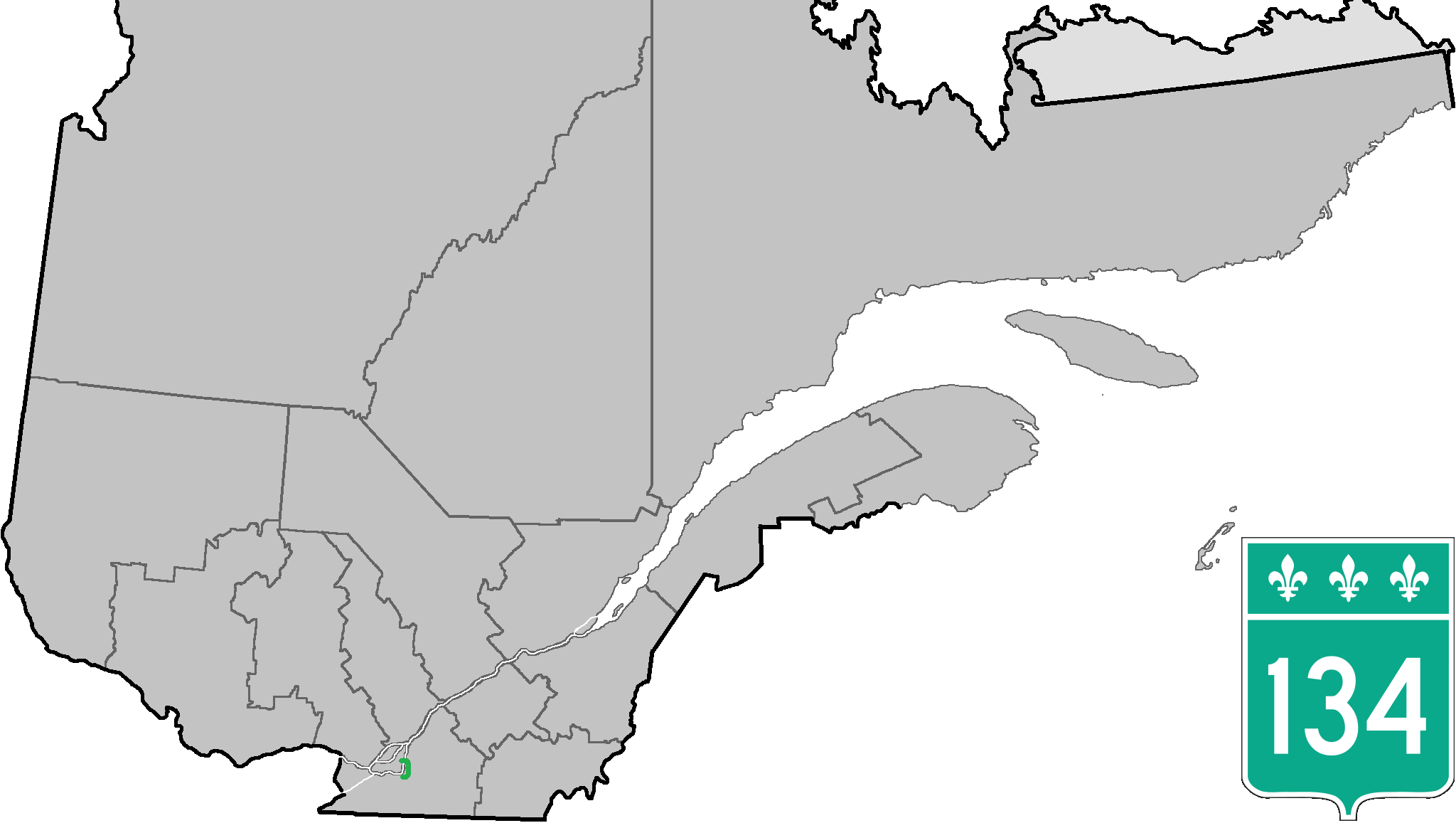

Route information
- Maintained by Transports Québec
- Length: 21.4 km (13.3 mi)
- History: Route 9B

Major junctions
- South end: A-15 / R-132 in Candiac
- R-104 in La Prairie; A-10 in Brossard; R-112 / R-116 in Longueuil; A-20 / R-132 in Longueuil; R-136 (via Rue Notre-Dame) in Montreal
- North end: R-138 (Rue Sherbrooke) in Montreal

Location
- Country: Canada
- Province: Quebec
- Major cities: Montreal, Longueuil, Brossard

Highway system
- Quebec provincial highways; Autoroutes; List; Former
← R-133	→ R-136

Route 134 is a highway in the province of Quebec, running from Candiac on the South Shore of the Saint Lawrence River to Montreal, crossing the river on Jacques Cartier Bridge. On the South Shore, Route 134 is named Taschereau Boulevard (boulevard Taschereau), after the prominent Quebec family that included former premier Louis-Alexandre Taschereau. From Jacques Cartier Bridge to the end of the highway at Sherbrooke Street (Quebec Route 138) in Montreal, the highway is a one-way pair formed by Papineau Avenue and De Lorimier Avenue.

== Municipalities along Route 134 ==
- Candiac
- La Prairie
- Brossard
- Longueuil
- Montreal

== Major intersections ==
All exits are unnumbered.

RCM	Location	km	mi	Destinations	Notes
Roussillon	Candiac	0.0	0.0	A-15 south / R-132 west to I-87 south – New York	R-134 southern terminus; A-15 exit 45; northbound exit and southbound entrance; R-134 follows Boulevard Taschereau
Roussillon	La Prairie	3.0	1.9	Chemin de Saint-Jean (R-104 east) – Rivière-du-Loup (Centre-Ville)	R-104 western terminus
Longueuil	Brossard	7.0	4.3	A-10 – Pont Champlain, Montréal Centre-Ville, Sherbrooke	A-10 exit 9
Longueuil	Longueuil	13.8	8.6	R-112 / R-116 east – Pont Victoria, Belœil	Interchange; R-116 western terminus
Longueuil	Longueuil	14.0	8.7	Boulevard Jacques-Cartier	Interchange
Longueuil	Longueuil	14.7	9.1	Boulevard Curé-Poirier	Interchange; northbound access to Boulevard Jacques-Cartier
Longueuil	Longueuil	15.7	9.8	Boulevard Desaulniers	Interchange
Longueuil	Longueuil	16.6	10.3	Boulevard La Fayette	Interchange; northbound exit and southbound entrance
Longueuil	Longueuil	17.0	10.6	A-20 / R-132 – La Prairie, U.S.A., Varennes, Québec	Interchange; R-134 leaves Boulevard Taschereau; A-20 exit 82
St. Lawrence River		17.5– 19.6	10.9– 12.2	Pont Jacques-Cartier (Jacques-Cartier Bridge)	
Montreal	Montreal	18.7	11.6	Parc Jean-Drapeau	Interchange part of the Jacques-Cartier Bridge; access to Saint Helen's Island
Montreal	Montreal	20.3	12.6	To R-136 (Rue Notre-Dame) – Centre-Ville	One-way transition; northbound follows Avenue De Lorimier; southbound follows Avenue Papineau
Montreal	Montreal	21.4	13.3	Rue Sherbrooke (R-138)	R-134 northern terminus; Avenue De Lorimier and Avenue Papineau continue north
1.000 mi = 1.609 km; 1.000 km = 0.621 mi: Incomplete access

== See also ==
- List of Quebec provincial highways
