= Richelieu, Quebec =

Richelieu
- City
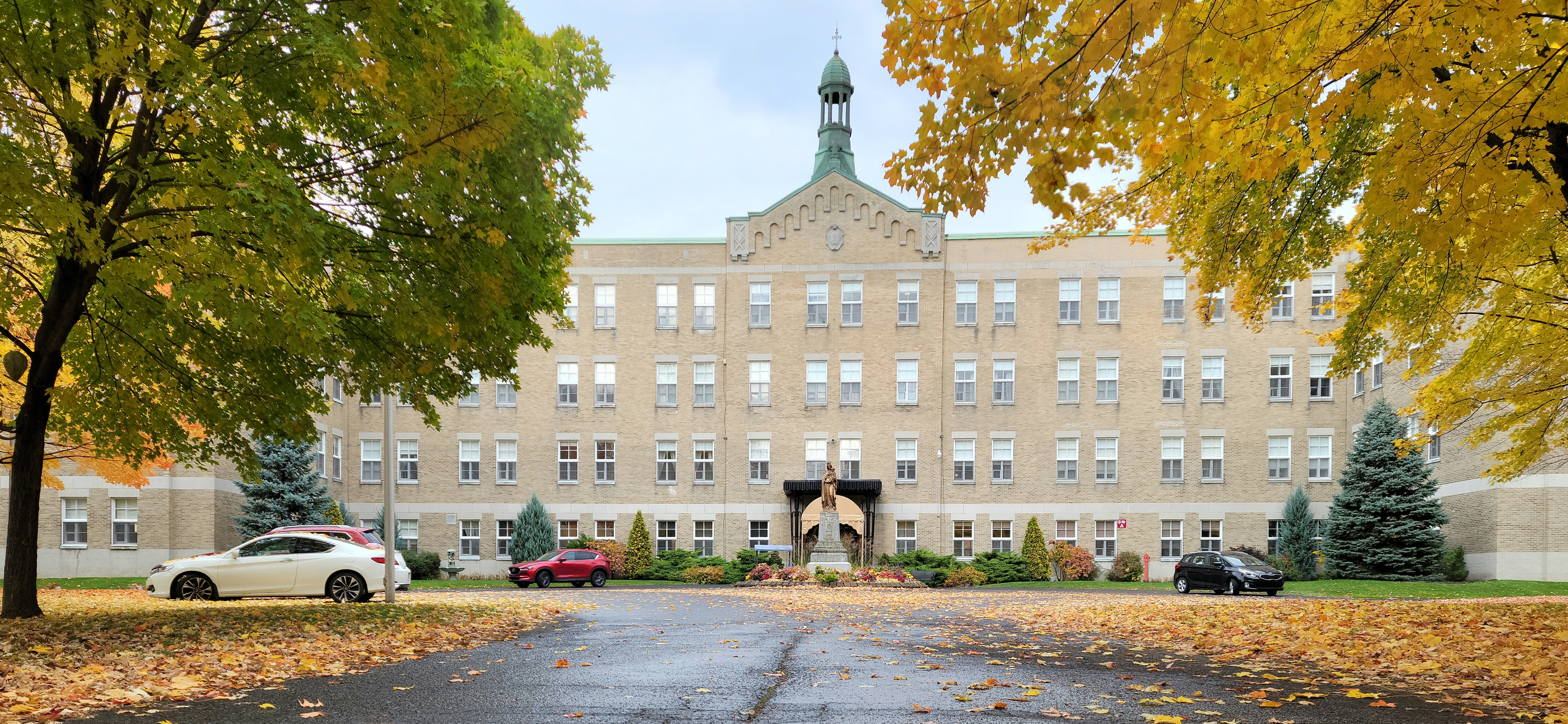

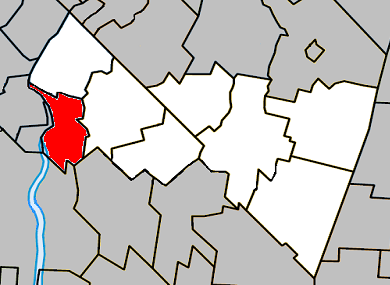
- Location within Rouville RCM.

- Location in southern Quebec.
- Coordinates: 45°27′N 73°15′W
- Country: Canada
- Province: Quebec
- Region: Montérégie
- RCM: Rouville
- Constituted: March 15, 2000

Government
  - Mayor: Jacques Ladouceur
  - Federal riding: Beloeil—Chambly
  - Prov. riding: Chambly

Area
  - Total: 32.50 km^{2} (12.55 sq mi)
  - Land: 30.96 km^{2} (11.95 sq mi)

Population (2021)
  - Total: 5,742
  - Density: 185.4/km^{2} (480/sq mi)
  - Pop 2016-2021: ▲9.7%
  - Dwellings: 2,506
- Time zone: UTC−5 (EST)
  - Summer (DST): UTC−4 (EDT)
- Postal code(s): J3L
- Area codes: 450 and 579
- Highways A-10: R-112; R-133; R-227
- Website: www.ville.richelieu.qc.ca

Richelieu (French: [ʁiʃ(ə)ljø]) is a city in Rouville Regional County Municipality, in the province of Quebec, Canada. The population as of the Canada 2021 Census was 5,742. Its name comes from the fact that it lies along the Richelieu River.

== History ==
The territory of the municipalities of Richelieu and Notre-Dame-de-Bonsecours was part of the seigneury granted to Jacques de Chambly in 1672, then to the seigneurs Hertel, Grant, de Salaberry and Yule. The bridge that crosses the river between Richelieu and Chambly is named "Pont Yule" in honour of John Yule, the last seigneur of Chambly (1812-1886).

The seigneury of Chambly-Est included four fiefs: Jenison, Rouville, des Pauvres, and the Beaulac fief. The latter covered the territories of Richelieu and Notre-Dame-de-Bonsecours.

In 1855, a year after the abolition of the seigneurial system by the Legislative Assembly, the inhabitants began to take steps to found our two municipalities. In this way they would pursue the desire that some farmers had expressed as early as 1815, judging that the journey to the church of Saint-Mathias was too difficult, especially in the spring and fall.

The village of Richelieu was incorporated as a municipality on January 1, 1869, under Act 23, Vict. chap. 61. It will take the name of the river that flows along its territory. The municipality of Notre-Dame-de-Bonsecours was erected by virtue of the same act on February 15, 1869. It took the name of the parish whose decree of canonical erection dates from September 5, 1868.

The current territory of the parish of Notre-Dame-de-Bonsecours was detached from the parishes of Sainte-Marie-de-Monnoir and Saint-Mathias. In 1854, John Yule had offered four acres of his land to build the church.

In July 1899, the hydroelectric power station, of which some remains can still be seen, began production. A 27 km line connected the generating station to Montreal and the voltage of 12,500 volts was quite a feat for the time. The power plant was demolished in 1965.

The current town hall, built in 1958, hosts council meetings that were once held at the railway station, the Catholic Foresters' Hall, the sacristy or the old schoolhouse. The fire station was inaugurated in 1967.

In 1969, on the occasion of its centennial, the village of Richelieu received its letters patent conferring on it the status of a town. That year also marked the twinning of our municipality with the city of Richelieu in France, which was built in 1631, thanks to the will of Cardinal Richelieu, Prime Minister of France under Louis XIII, according to an urban plan that has remained intact to this day. Fortier Park was named in honour of Marcel Fortier, Mayor of Richelieu, France.

On March 15, 2000, the city of Richelieu and the municipality of Notre-Dame-de-Bonsecours merged to create a new city, the city of Richelieu.

== Demographics ==
In the 2021 Census of Population conducted by Statistics Canada, Richelieu had a population of 5,742 living in 2,414 of its 2,506 total private dwellings, a change of 9.7% from its 2016 population of 5,236. With a land area of 30.96 km^{2} (11.95 sq mi), it had a population density of 185.5/km^{2} (480.4/sq mi) in 2021.

Population trend:

| Census | Population | Change (%) |
|---|---|---|
| 2021 | 5,742 | ▲9.7% |
| 2016 | 5,236 | ▼4.2% |
| 2011 | 5,467 | ▲5.0% |
| 2006 | 5,208 | ▲3.7% |
| 2001 | 4,851 | ▲51.8% |
| 1996 | 3,195 | ▲12.4% |
| 1991 | 2,843 | ▲40.7% |
| 1986 | 2,020 | ▲10.3% |
| 1981 | 1,832 | ▲4.4% |
| 1976 | 1,755 | ▼1.2% |
| 1971 | 1,777 | ▲6.9% |
| 1966 | 1,663 | ▲3.2% |
| 1961 | 1,612 | ▲15.3% |
| 1956 | 1,398 | ▲23.9% |
| 1951 | 1,128 | ▲45.9% |
| 1941 | 773 | ▲47.5% |
| 1931 | 524 | ▲23.0% |
| 1921 | 426 | ▲28.3% |
| 1911 | 332 | ▼14.7% |
| 1901 | 389 | ▼26.6% |
| 1891 | 530 | ▲35.9% |
| 1881 | 390 | ▲2.6% |
| 1871 | 380 | N/A |

Richelieu amalgamated with Municipality of Notre-Dame-de-Bon-Secours on March 15, 2000.

Mother tongue language (2021)

| Language | Population | Pct (%) |
|---|---|---|
| French only | 5,225 | 93.0% |
| English only | 150 | 2.7% |
| Both English and French | 80 | 1.4% |
| Other languages | 150 | 2.7% |

== Infrastructure ==
The CIT Chambly-Richelieu-Carignan provides commuter and local bus services.

== Education ==
The South Shore Protestant Regional School Board previously served the municipality.

== See also ==
- List of cities in Quebec
- 21st-century municipal history of Quebec
