= Saint-Césaire, Quebec =

Saint-Césaire
- City
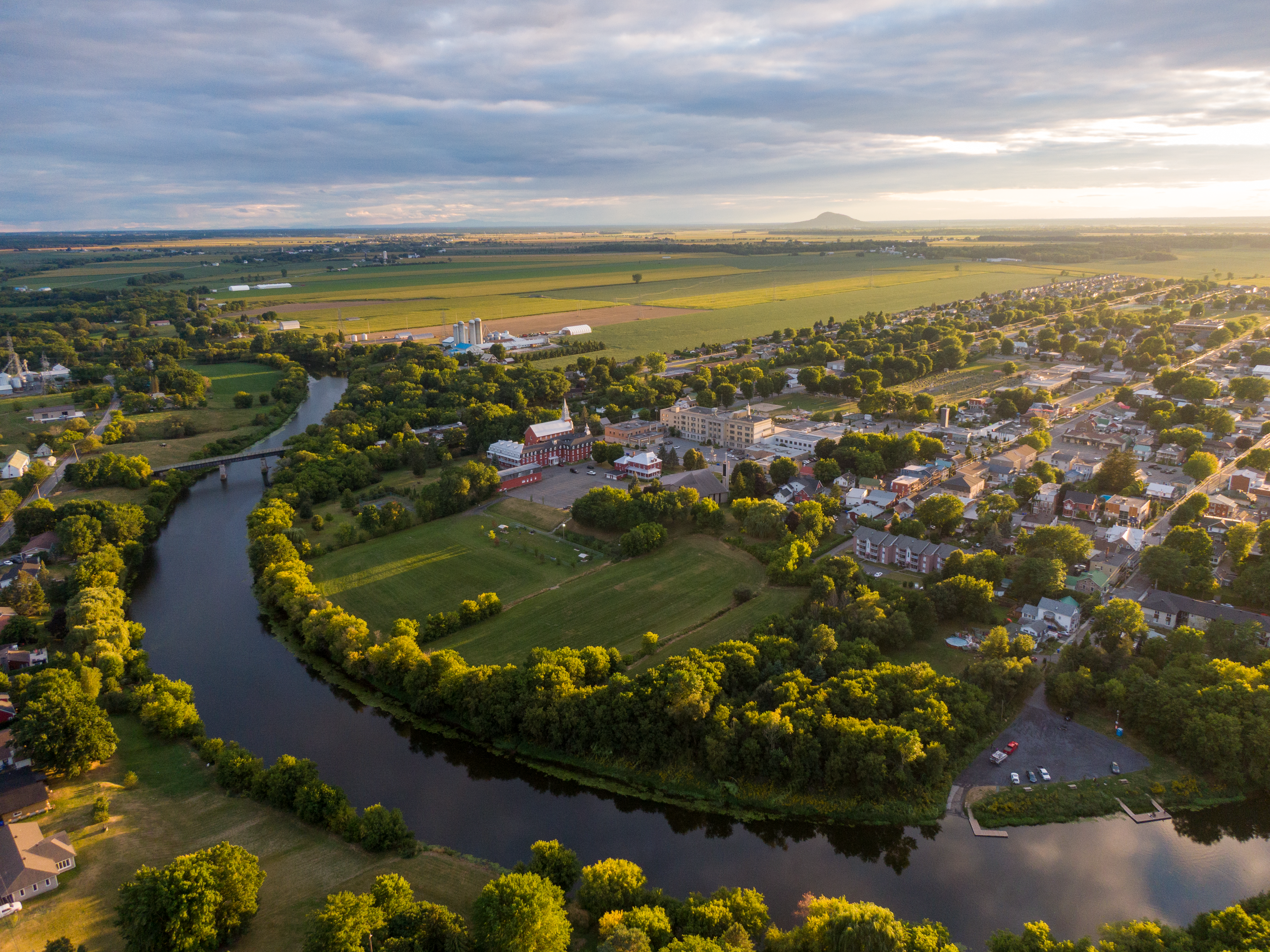
- Yamaska River at Saint-Césaire

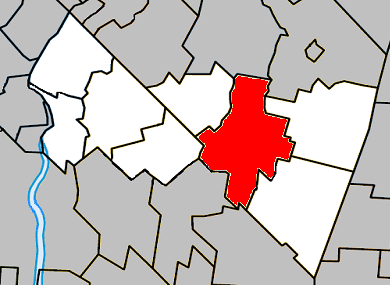
- Location within Rouville RCM

- Location in southern Quebec
- Coordinates: 45°25′N 73°00′W
- Country: Canada
- Province: Quebec
- Region: Montérégie
- RCM: Rouville
- Constituted: January 26, 2000

Government
  - Mayor: Sylvain Létourneau
  - Federal riding: Shefford
  - Prov. riding: Iberville

Area
  - Total: 84.30 km^{2} (32.55 sq mi)
  - Land: 83.55 km^{2} (32.26 sq mi)

Population (2011)
  - Total: 5,686
  - Density: 68.1/km^{2} (176/sq mi)
  - Pop 2006-2011: ▲10.4%
  - Dwellings: 2,435
- Time zone: UTC−5 (EST)
  - Summer (DST): UTC−4 (EDT)
- Postal code(s): J0L
- Area codes: 450 and 579
- Highways A-10: R-112; R-233
- Website: www.ville.saint-cesaire.qc.ca

Saint-Césaire (French pronunciation: [sɛ̃ sezɛʁ]) is a city in the Canadian province of Quebec, located within the Rouville Regional County Municipality in the province's Montérégie region. The population as of the Canada 2011 Census was 5,686.

== Demographics ==
In the 2021 Census of Population conducted by Statistics Canada, Saint-Césaire had a population of 5,972 living in 2,548 of its 2,641 total private dwellings, a change of 1.6% from its 2016 population of 5,877. With a land area of 83.06 km^{2} (32.07 sq mi), it had a population density of 71.9/km^{2} (186.2/sq mi) in 2021.

Population trend:

Census	Population	Change (%)
2011	5,686	▲10.4%
2006	5,151	▲6.2%
2001	4,850	▼1.7%
Merger	4,935 (+)	▲54.2%
1996	2,990	▲2.9%
1991	2,907	N/A

(+) Amalgamation of the merger of the City and the Parish of Saint-Césaire on January 26, 2000.

Mother tongue language (2006)

Language	Population	Pct (%)
French only	4,975	97.64%
English only	30	0.59%
Both English and French	10	0.20%
Other languages	80	1.57%

== See also ==
- List of cities in Quebec
- 21st-century municipal history of Quebec
