= Taschereau Boulevard =

Thoroughfare on Montreal's south shore

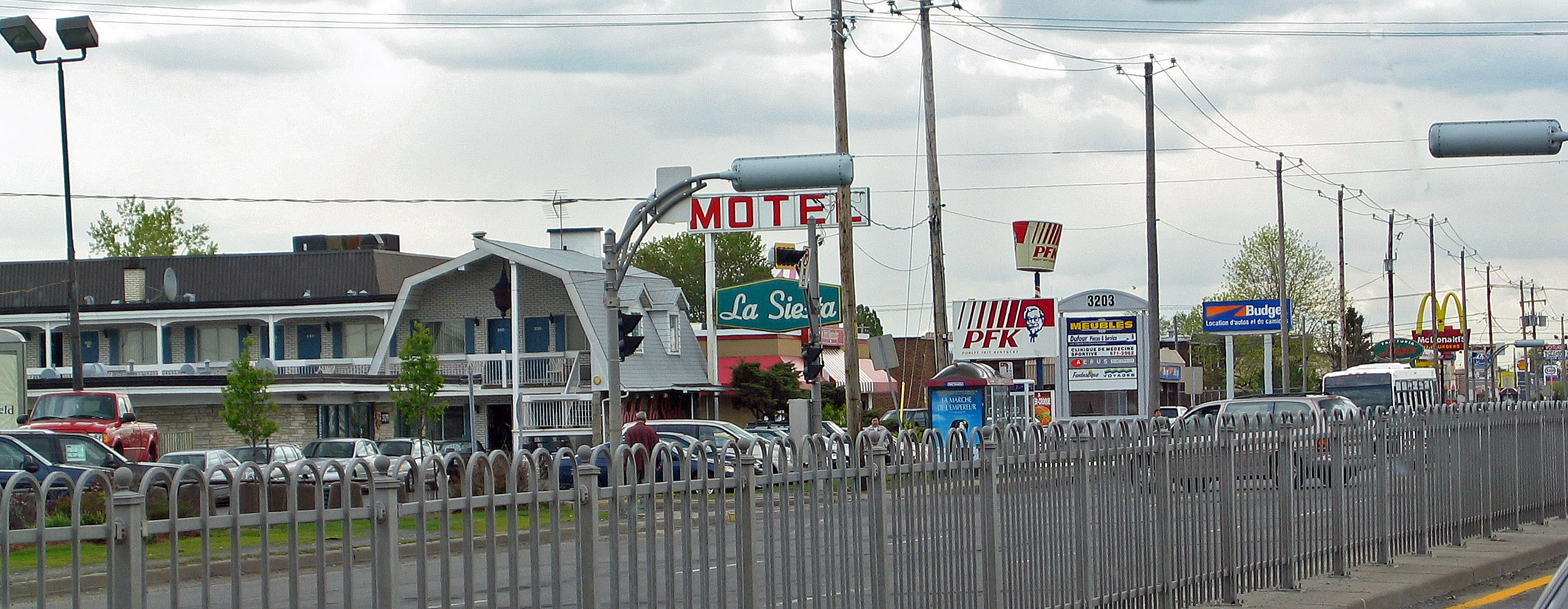
- Taschereau Boulevard in Greenfield Park
- Interactive map of Taschereau Boulevard
- Native name: Boulevard Taschereau
- Part of: R-134 between Jacques-Cartier Bridge and Montcalm Boulevard (Candiac)
- Length: 18.8 km (11.7 mi)
- Location: Longueuil, Brossard, La Prairie, Candiac
- Major junctions: A-10 Eastern Townships Expressway; R-112 R-116 Sir Wilfrid Laurier Highway; A-20 R-132 René Lévesque Expressway; R-104; A-15 René Lévesque Expressway

Construction
- Inauguration: September 12, 1932

Taschereau Boulevard (French: Boulevard Taschereau) is a major suburban boulevard located on the south shore of Montreal, Quebec, Canada. It is a section of Quebec Route 134 and runs from Longueuil to Candiac (junction of Autoroute 15). It is named after the prominent Quebec family, which included former premier Louis-Alexandre Taschereau. At 17.5 km (10.9 mi), it is one of the longest commercial arteries in Canada. It serves the heart of an area with an estimated population of 400,000.

Between its approach near the Jacques-Cartier Bridge and the Quebec Route 112 and Quebec Route 116 expressway, which links Longueuil with the Saint-Hubert and Saint-Bruno sectors, Route 134 is a six-lane expressway with interchanges to local areas within Longueuil and LeMoyne. In some sections, it is designed as a right-in/right-out expressway with at-grade intersections on the municipality-maintained (usually right) line to local streets from one side of the highway.

== Taschereau Interchange ==
At the intersection of Taschereau Boulevard and Autoroute 10 (45.464917°N 73.466134°W), a construction project was undertaken in 2002 to reorganize the entry and exit ramps. This project is planned to continue well into 2008. This project also intends to allow the traffic to pass through the centre of the interchange, to reduce noise pollution through sound barriers, to allow a bus lane (and later a light railway transit system) to access RTL bus terminals without affecting highway or road traffic.

== Points of interest ==
- Charles LeMoyne Hospital
- Carnaval Mall
- Champlain Mall
- Place Greenfield Park
- Terminus Panama
