= Robert-Bourassa Boulevard — University Street =

Thoroughfare in Montreal, Canada

Robert Bourassa Boulevard University Street
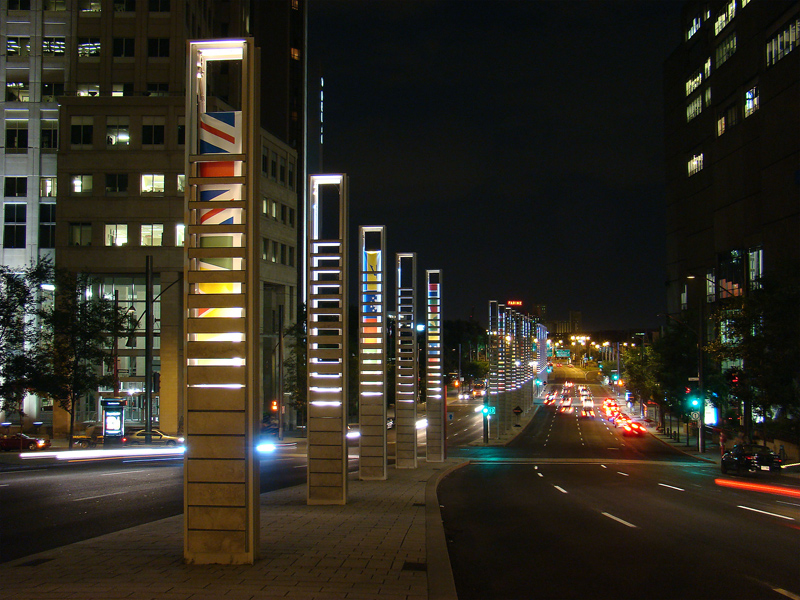
- At the corner of De La Gauchetière, looking southward.
- Interactive map of Robert Bourassa Boulevard; University Street
- Length: 2.1 km (1.3 mi)
- Location: Between Notre Dame Street and Pine Avenue: Robert Bourassa: Between Notre Dame Street and Sherbrooke Street; University: Between Sherbrooke Street and Pine Avenue
- Coordinates: 45.503518°N 73.570496°W
- Major junctions: A-10; R-136

Robert Bourassa Boulevard, (officially in French: Boulevard Robert-Bourassa) formerly named University Street (excluding a substantial preserved section), is a major north-south artery in downtown Montreal, Quebec, Canada, that is 2.1 km (1.3 mi) in total length.

Robert Bourassa Boulevard runs 1.2 km (0.75 mi) from the foot of the Bonaventure Expressway (and the start of Quebec Autoroute 10) to where it intersects with Sherbrooke Street. A substantial 0.9 km (0.56 mi) portion of the road retains the name University Street (officially in French: rue University, rather than rue de l'Université) and runs from McGill University to the former Royal Victoria Hospital complex, where the road ends.

== Origins ==
University Street was named and inaugurated on November 30, 1842. The major part of the street links Dorchester (later renamed René Lévesque Boulevard) and Sherbrooke Street and was ceded by the descendants of Sir Thomas Phillips, a merchant, and a construction entrepreneur who became a city councillor in the 1840s. University then ended at Sherbrooke Street, where a little path continued to McGill University from which the street got its name. It was eventually extended from Sherbrooke Street to just past Pine Avenue, where it reaches the base of Mount Royal and goes along the former Royal Victoria Hospital.

McGill University has many buildings on the street.

On March 15, 2015, following a decision to rename the street, University Street was shortened to a three-blocks section between Sherbrooke Street and Pine Avenue and now ends slightly beyond at the base of Mount Royal.

== Partial name change ==
On August 27, 2014, Montreal Mayor Denis Coderre announced that the part of University Street through Downtown Montreal would be renamed Robert Bourassa Boulevard, after former Quebec Premier Robert Bourassa. The portion of the street stretches from Notre Dame to Sherbrooke Street. Only a small section of the street, between McGill University and the former Royal Victoria Hospital, would retain its original name. The official change took place on March 15, 2015.

=== Controversy ===
The name change has not been without controversy. Some city officials have raised complaints that the change is political in nature and does not reflect the importance of McGill University in the development of the area.
