= Rouville Regional County Municipality =

Rouville
- Regional county municipality
- Location in province of Quebec.
- Coordinates: 45°26′N 73°03′W
- Country: Canada
- Province: Quebec
- Region: Montérégie
- Effective: January 1, 1982
- County seat: Marieville

Government
  - Type: Prefecture
  - Prefect: Michel Picotte

Area
  - Total: 490.10 km^{2} (189.23 sq mi)
  - Land: 483.12 km^{2} (186.53 sq mi)

Population (2016)
  - Total: 36,536
  - Density: 75.6/km^{2} (196/sq mi)
  - Change 2011-2016: ▲2.4%
  - Dwellings: 15,470
- Time zone: UTC−5 (EST)
  - Summer (DST): UTC−4 (EDT)
- Area codes: 450 and 579
- Website: www.mrcrouville.qc.ca

Rouville (French pronunciation: [ʁuvil]) is a regional county municipality in the Montérégie region of Quebec, Canada. Its seat is Marieville.

== Subdivisions ==
There are 8 subdivisions within the Rouville Regional County Municipality:

Cities & Towns (3)

- Marieville
- Richelieu
- Saint-Césaire

Municipalities (5)

- Ange-Gardien
- Rougemont
- Saint-Mathias-sur-Richelieu
- Saint-Paul-d'Abbotsford
- Sainte-Angèle-de-Monnoir

== Demographics ==
=== Population ===
Canada census – Rouville community profile

	2021	2016	2011
Population	37,889 (+3.7% from 2016)	36,536 (+2.4% from 2011)	35,690 (+13.8% from 2006)
Land area	482.80 km^{2} (186.41 sq mi)	483.12 km^{2} (186.53 sq mi)	483.21 km^{2} (186.57 sq mi)
Population density	78.5/km^{2} (203/sq mi)	75.6/km^{2} (196/sq mi)	73.9/km^{2} (191/sq mi)
Median age	42 (M: 42, F: 42)	40.8 (M: 40.5, F: 41.2)	40.1 (M: 39.6, F: 40.6)
Private dwellings	15,755 (total)	15,470 (total)	14,819 (total)
Median household income		$65,186	$57,354

References: 2021 2016 2011

Historical Census Data - Rouville Regional County Municipality, Quebec

Year	Pop.	±%
1991	31,444	—
1996	33,090	+5.2%
1996A	30,177	−8.8%

Year	Pop.	±%
2001	29,980	−0.7%
2006	31,365	+4.6%
2011	35,690	+13.8%

Year	Pop.	±%
2016	36,536	+2.4%

(A) adjustment to reflect boundary change.

=== Language ===
Canada Census Mother Tongue - Rouville Regional County Municipality, Quebec
Census	Total	French			English			French & English			Other		
Year	Responses	Count	Trend	Pop %	Count	Trend	Pop %	Count	Trend	Pop %	Count	Trend	Pop %
2016	35,880	34,380	▲1.9%	95.8%	660	▲1.5%	1.8%	190	0%	0.5%	650	▲51.2%	1.8%
2011	35,055	33,755	▲13.8%	96.29%	650	▲12.1%	1.86%	190	▲90.0%	0.54%	460	▼2.1%	1.31%
2006	30,820	29,670	▲3.9%	96.27%	580	▲14.9%	1.88%	100	▼41.2%	0.32%	470	▲88.0%	1.53%
2001	29,490	28,565	▼9.9%	96.86%	505	▲1.0%	1.71%	170	0%	0.58%	250	▼15.3%	0.85%
1996	32,685	31,720	n/a	97.05%	500	n/a	1.53%	170	n/a	0.52%	295	n/a	0.90%

== Transportation ==
=== Access Routes ===
Highways and numbered routes that run through the municipality, including external routes that start or finish at the county border:

- Autoroutes
  - A-10
- Principal Highways
  - R-112
  - R-133
  - R-137
  - R-139
- Secondary Highways
  - R-227
  - R-229
  - R-231
  - R-233
  - R-235
- External Routes
  - None

== See also ==
- List of regional county municipalities and equivalent territories in Quebec
