= Quebec Autoroute 610 =

Highway in Quebec

Autoroute 610
- Autoroute Louis-Bilodeau

Route information
- Maintained by Transports Québec
- Length: 10.3 km (6.4 mi)
- Existed: 1988–present

Major junctions
- West end: A-10 / A-55 in Sherbrooke
- East end: R-112 in Sherbrooke

Location
- Country: Canada
- Province: Quebec
- Major cities: Sherbrooke

Highway system
- Quebec provincial highways; Autoroutes; List; Former
← A-573	→ A-640

Autoroute 610 (A-610), also known as Autoroute Louis Bilodeau, is a short spur autoroute serving the eastern and northern suburbs of Sherbrooke, Quebec, Canada. It bypasses Sherbrooke's city centre to the north and connects the A-55 and A-10 to Route 112, a primary regional link to East Angus, Thetford Mines, and Lac-Mégantic.

== History ==
The first section of Highway 610 was opened to traffic in 1988 as an extension of the A-10. The eastern part (east of Exit 7, formerly Exit 150), opened in 1992, is a two-lane freeway. Original plans for the A-10 called for it to continue east to Thetford Mines, but this section was never built. On 29 September 2006, Transports Québec announced plans to redesignate the section of A-10 east of the A-55 as Autoroute 610. The MTQ's rationale was that the new route number is more consistent with the Quebec road numbering plan and would be less confusing to motorists travelling through and beyond the region. As a result, Autoroute 10 (multiplexed with the A-55 east of km 121) reaches its terminus at the interchange with A-610.

In January 2008, A-610 was renamed in honour of Louis Bilodeau, a longtime broadcaster on CHLT-TV.

A proposal to build the East-West Highway across central and northern Maine calls for the A-610 (its original numbering as A-10 restored) to be extended to the U.S. border at Coburn Gore where it would meet the new highway. Doing so would create a new and more direct limited-access highway link between Maine, the Maritimes, and Montreal.

== Exit list ==
The entire route is in Sherbrooke.

mi	km	Exit	Destinations	Notes
0.00	0.00	–	A-10 west / A-55 – Magog, Montréal, Drummondville, Québec	Exit 143 on A-10 / A-55; eastern terminus of A-10
3.30	2.05	3	Boulevard Saint-François – Sherbrooke Centre-Ville	
7.00	4.35	7	R-216 – Fleurimont, Stoke	
11.30	7.02	–	R-112 (Rue King) – East Angus, Thetford Mines, Lac-Mégantic	Traffic circle with slip ramps
1.000 mi = 1.609 km; 1.000 km = 0.621 mi

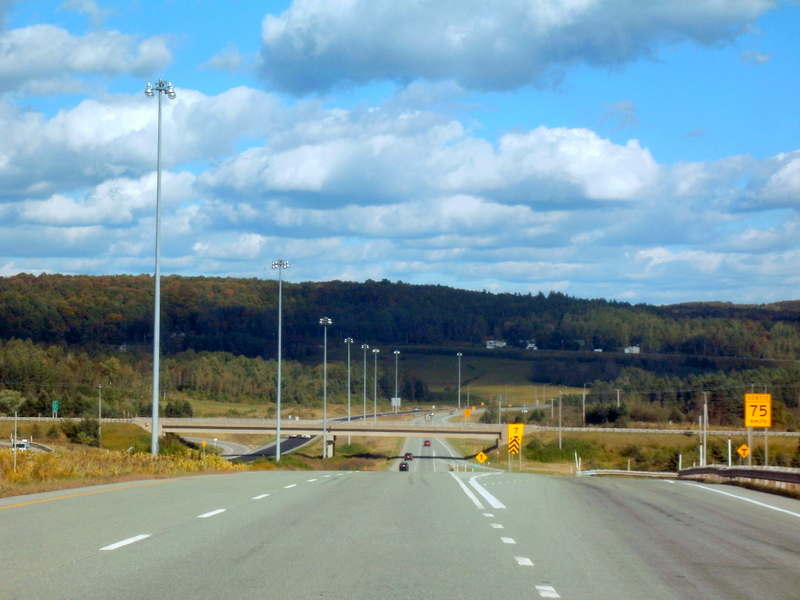
Autoroute Louis Bilodeau
