= Saint-Paul-d'Abbotsford =

- Municipality
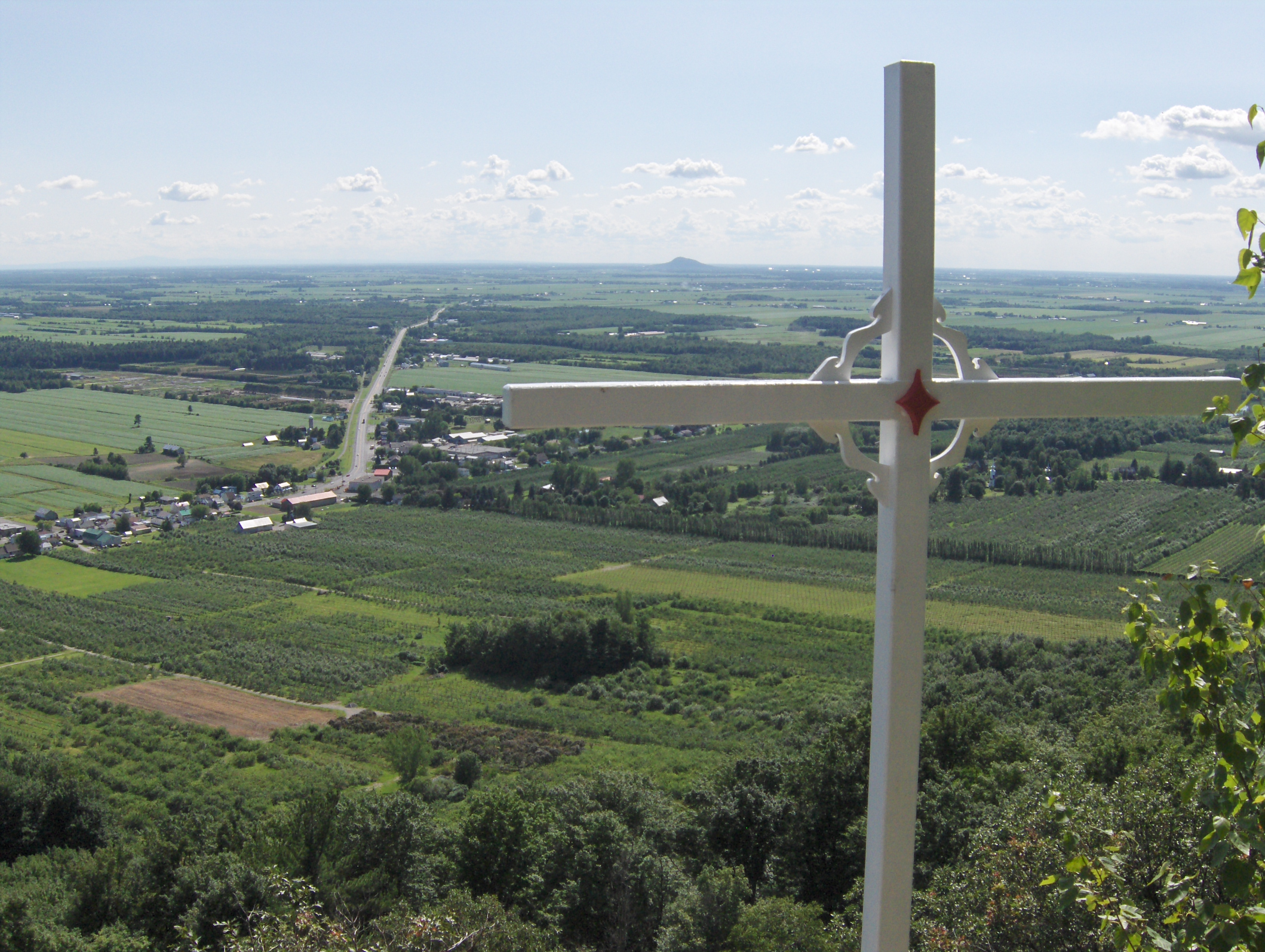
- Motto: Macte virtute six itur ad astra (English: "For doing as we ought below")
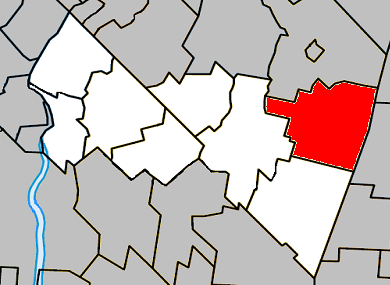
- Location within Rouville RCM

- Location in southern Quebec
- Coordinates: 45°26′N 72°53′W
- Country: Canada
- Province: Quebec
- Region: Montérégie
- RCM: Rouville
- Constituted: July 1, 1855

Government
  - Mayor: Robert Vynke (2017)
  - Federal riding: Shefford
  - Prov. riding: Iberville

Area
  - Total: 80.20 km^{2} (30.97 sq mi)
  - Land: 79.60 km^{2} (30.73 sq mi)

Population (2021)
  - Total: 2,886
  - Density: 36.3/km^{2} (94/sq mi)
  - Pop 2016-2021: ▼0.1%
  - Dwellings: 1,216
- Time zone: UTC−05:00 (EST)
  - Summer (DST): UTC−04:00 (EDT)
- Postal code(s): J0E 1A0
- Area codes: 450 and 579
- Highways: R-112; R-235
- Website: www.saint pauldabbotsford.qc.ca

Saint-Paul-d'Abbotsford is a municipality in the Canadian province of Quebec, located within the Rouville Regional County Municipality in the province's Montérégie region. The population as of the 2021 Canadian Census was 2,886.

== Demographics ==
=== Population ===
Population trend:

Census	Population	Change (%)
2021	2,886	▼0.1%
2016	2,890	▲0.7%
2011	2,870	▲1.6%
2006	2,824	▼1.4%
2001	2,863	▲2.7%
1996	2,789	▲2.9%
1991	2,711	▲1.7%
1986	2,666	▲3.8%
1981	2,569	▲13.6%
1976	2,261	▲19.1%
1971	1,898	▲3%
1966	1,843	▼3.3%
1961	1,905	▲11.9%
1956	1,703	▲3.8%
1951	1,641	▲14.4%
1941	1,434	▲12,1%
1931	1,279	▼3.3%
1921	1,322	▲13.1%
1911	1,169	▼12.3%
1901	1,333	▼28.8%
1891	1,873	▲16.7%
1881	1,605	▼4.1%
1871	1,674	▲8%
1861	1,550	N/A

=== Language ===
Mother tongue language (2021)

Language	Population	Pct (%)
French only	2,735	94.8%
English only	45	1.6%
Both English and French	20	0.7%
Other languages	85	2.9%

== See also ==
- List of municipalities in Quebec
