= Quebec Route 136 (Quebec City) =

Highway in Quebec, Canada

Route 136
- Boulevard Champlain
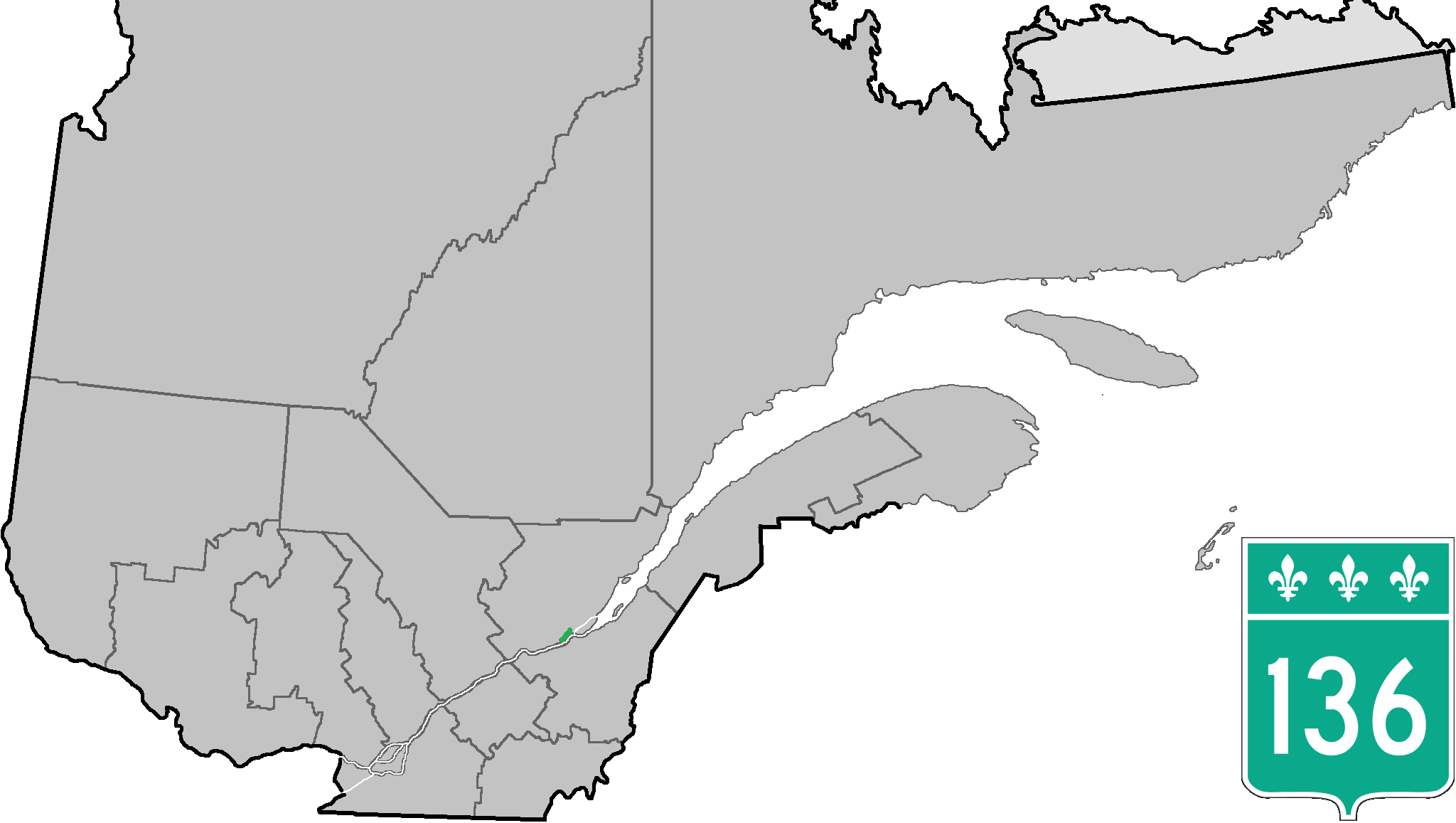

Route information
- Maintained by Transports Québec
- Length: 11.6 km (7.2 mi)

Major junctions
- West end: A-73 / R-175 in Sainte-Foy–Sillery–Cap-Rouge
- East end: A-440 in La Cité-Limoilou

Location
- Country: Canada
- Province: Quebec

Highway system
- Quebec provincial highways; Autoroutes; List; Former
← R-136	→ R-137

Route 136 is a provincial highway located in the Capitale-Nationale region of Quebec. The highway runs from Autoroute 440 (Autoroute Dufferin-Montmorency) to Autoroute 73 near the Pierre Laporte and Quebec bridges in Quebec City. A short route, most of Route 136 is a parkway along the Saint Lawrence River connecting the Basse-Ville of Old Quebec to the bridges. The eastern section follows city streets in that community.

Route 136 is shown in the Quebec Ministry of Transportation road network map but is not identified as such on some other maps. It is also known as Boulevard Champlain for most of its length as well as several other short streets near A-440, following the north shore of the Saint Lawrence River just south of downtown.

== Municipalities along Route 136 ==
- Quebec City
  - Sainte-Foy–Sillery–Cap-Rouge
  - La Cité-Limoilou

== See also ==
- List of Quebec provincial highways
