= Quebec Route 136 (Montreal) =

Highway in Montreal, Quebec

Route 136
- Autoroute Ville-Marie; Autoroute 720 (former)
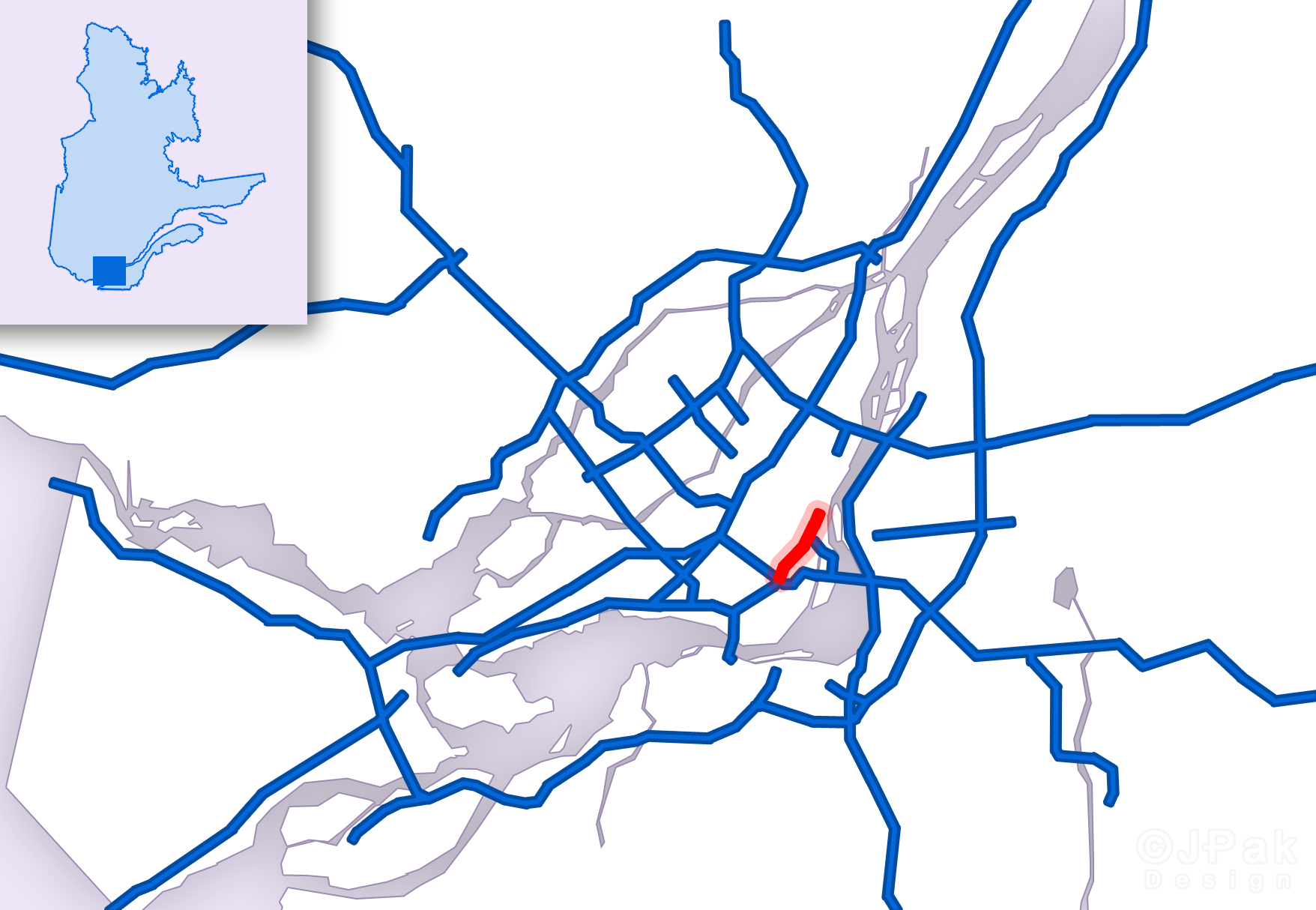
- Map of Greater Montreal with Route 136 highlighted in red

Route information
- Maintained by Transports Québec
- Length: 8.5 km (5.3 mi)
- Existed: 1972–present
- Restrictions: Height and HAZMAT restrictions in the Ville-Marie Tunnel

Major junctions
- West end: A-15 / A-20 in Montréal
- A-10 in Montréal
- East end: Rue Notre-Dame in Montréal

Location
- Country: Canada
- Province: Quebec
- Major cities: Montréal, Westmount

Highway system
- Quebec provincial highways; Autoroutes; List; Former
← R-134	→ R-136

Route 136 (R-136), formerly Autoroute 720, known as the Ville-Marie Expressway (English) or Autoroute Ville-Marie (French) is a freeway in the Canadian province of Quebec that is a spur route of Autoroute 20 in Montreal. Its western terminus is located at the Turcot Interchange, a junction with Autoroute 15 and Autoroute 20, and its eastern terminus is near the Jacques Cartier Bridge (Route 134), where the highway merges with Notre-Dame Street. The Autoroute Ville-Marie designation is named after the downtown borough of Ville-Marie, through which the expressway is routed. It was designated Autoroute 720 until 2021 when it was renamed to Route 136.

Part of R-136 runs underground (below grade) through Downtown Montreal. This section begins from the west at Rue Guy (exit 4: Rue de la Montagne / Rue Atwater) and remains underground almost all the way to its eastern end, except for a short section between Rue Saint-Urbain and Rue Hôtel-de-Ville. The tunnelled section west of this gap is known as the Ville-Marie Tunnel, and the section east of it is known as Viger Tunnel. However, locals regard both tunnels as one, and the term Ville-Marie Tunnel is often used to refer to both tunnels.

== History ==
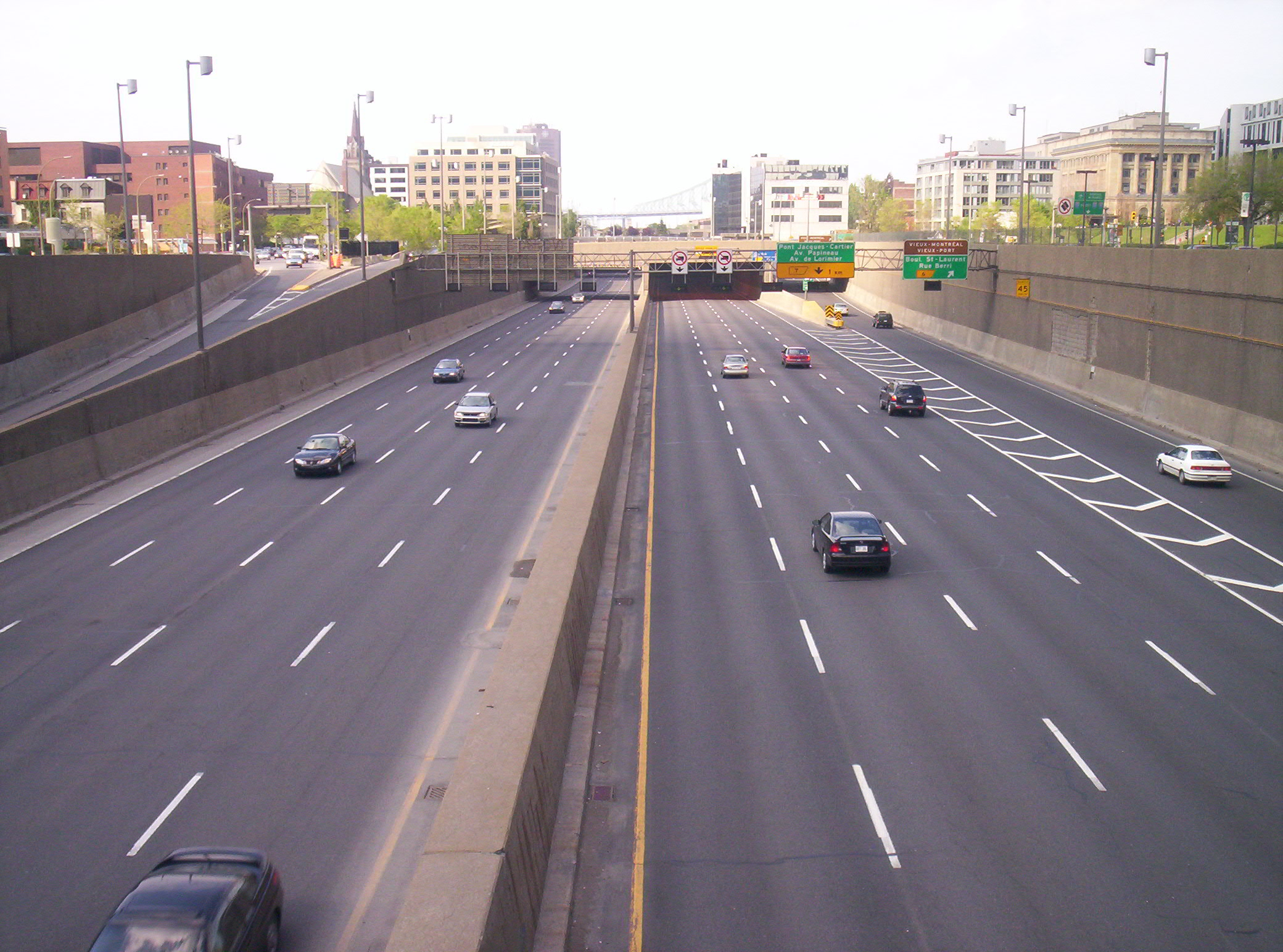
The Ville-Marie Expressway near Old Montreal

It was originally envisioned that Autoroute 20 would extend from the Turcot Interchange, along the route of the 720, to the Louis Hippolyte Lafontaine Bridge-Tunnel. Indeed, when the first section of the expressway was constructed and opened in the early 1970s, many Montrealers, anticipating that it would eventually replace the Metropolitan Expressway as the primary connector route to the Lafontaine Tunnel, and onward to Quebec City, dubbed the then-unnamed roadway the "Downtown Trans-Canada Highway". The provincial transport ministry (Le ministère des Transports du Québec, or MTQ) had planned to extend the Viger Tunnel east to Autoroute 25 at its Souligny Avenue interchange. The right-of-way has existed since the original layout of the A-720, and buildings along the extension were demolished at that time, even though the 720 was not completed due to cost constraints. The government of Montreal instead converted the portion of Rue Notre Dame east of the Jacques Cartier Bridge into a six-lane urban boulevard, rather than continue a sunken limited-access expressway. The final project was approved, and work began on Souligny Avenue to double the span of the travel lanes.

In 2007, working crews for Transports Québec discovered major cracks in a support pillar and closed several lanes of the expressway. Transports Quebec announced on August 10, 2007, major repair projects for a large section of the Expressway west of the Ville-Marie tunnel.

On July 31, 2011, part of the roof of the Ville-Marie Tunnel collapsed, sending large chunks of concrete to the road below. This incident occurred at a time with little traffic and no vehicles were damaged. Several construction workers were on site at the time and were unharmed. The tunnel had to be closed for repair of the roof and several other parts of the tunnel. Transport Minister Sam Hamad announced on Friday, August 5 that the tunnel would re-open the following day.

In 2021, the A-720 was renamed to Route 136 due to the highway having reduced lane sizes following the reconstruction of the Turcot Interchange.

Autoroute 720
- Location: Montreal
- Length: 8.5 km (5.3 mi)
- Existed: 1972–2021

== Exit list ==
The entire route is located in Montréal.

Location	km	mi	Exit	Destinations	Notes
Montréal	0.00	0.00	–	A-20 west (Autoroute du Souvenir) – Aéroport P.-E.-Trudeau, Toronto	
Montréal	1.3	0.81	1-N	A-15 north (Autoroute Décarie) – Laval, Aéroport Mirabel	Exit 63-E on A-15
Westmount	2.3	1.4	1-S	A-15 south / A-20 east (Pont Champlain) – New York, Quebec	Turcot Interchange; provides access to Rue St-Rémi and Boul. Décarie; eastbound access to A-15 southbound via Exit 68 on A-20. Exit 63 on A-15
Westmount	2.5	1.6	2	Avenue Atwater	Eastbound exit only; bus lane exit near km 2.0
Montréal	3.3	2.1	3	Rue Guy – Centre-Ville Montreal	Eastbound exit and westbound entrance
Montréal	3.6	2.2	4	Avenue Atwater	Westbound exit only
Montréal	4.3	2.7	4	Rue de la Montagne / Rue Saint-Jacques	Eastbound exit and westbound entrance
Montréal	4.4	2.7	West end of the Ville-Marie Tunnel		
Montréal	5.6	3.5	5	A-10 east (Autoroute Bonaventure) – Pont Champlain, Sherbrooke, Rue University	Westbound exit and eastbound entrance; west end of A-10
Montréal	6.5	4.0	6	Boulevard Saint-Laurent / Rue Berri – Vieux-Montreal, Vieux-Port	Eastbound exit and westbound entrance
Montréal	7.5	4.7	East end of the Ville-Marie Tunnel		
Montréal	7.6	4.7	7	Pont Jacques-Cartier / Avenue Papineau / Avenue de Lorimier	Eastbound exit only
Montréal	7.7	4.8	-	Avenue Viger E	On-ramp; R-136 westbound begins
Montréal	8.0	5.0	-	Avenue Papineau	Westbound at-grade intersection with traffic lights; eastbound cannot turn onto Avenue Papineau; R-136 eastbound ends
Montréal	8.2	5.1	–	Rue Notre-Dame east	Continuation beyond De Lorimier Avenue
Montréal	13.6	8.5	-	Av. Dickson towards Rue Notre-Dame east - Av. Souligny	Avenue Souligny is a short 2 km expressway spur that connects to Autoroute 25. It was originally designed as part of a larger project that would have linked Route 136 to the Louis-Hippolyte-La Fontaine Tunnel, had the planned extension been completed.
Montréal	15.5	9.6	15-S	A-25 (TCH) south to A-20 – Tunnel Louis-Hippolyte-Lafontaine	Exit 3 (formerly exit 4) on A-25 northbound
Montréal	16	9.9	15-N	A-25 (TCH) north to – Laval/ A-40,	Exit has been reopened since March 2026
Montréal	16.5	10.3	-	Rue Honoré-Beaugrand	End of Av. Souligny spur. At-grade intersection with traffic lights
1.000 mi = 1.609 km; 1.000 km = 0.621 mi: Incomplete access

== Gallery ==
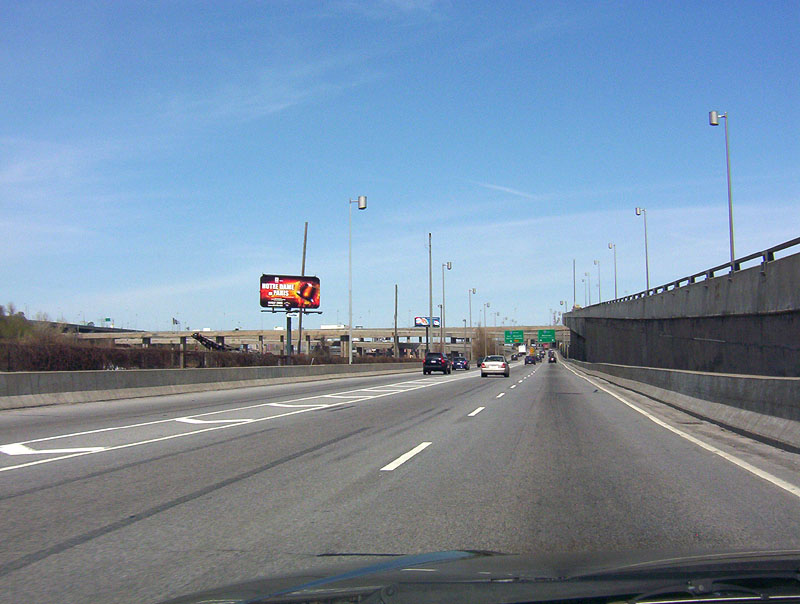
Approaching Turcot Interchange

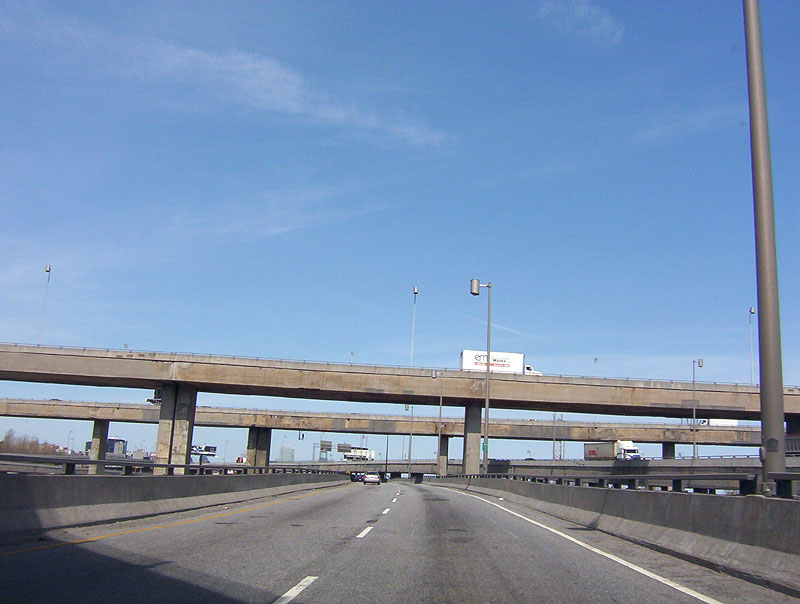
Start of interchange

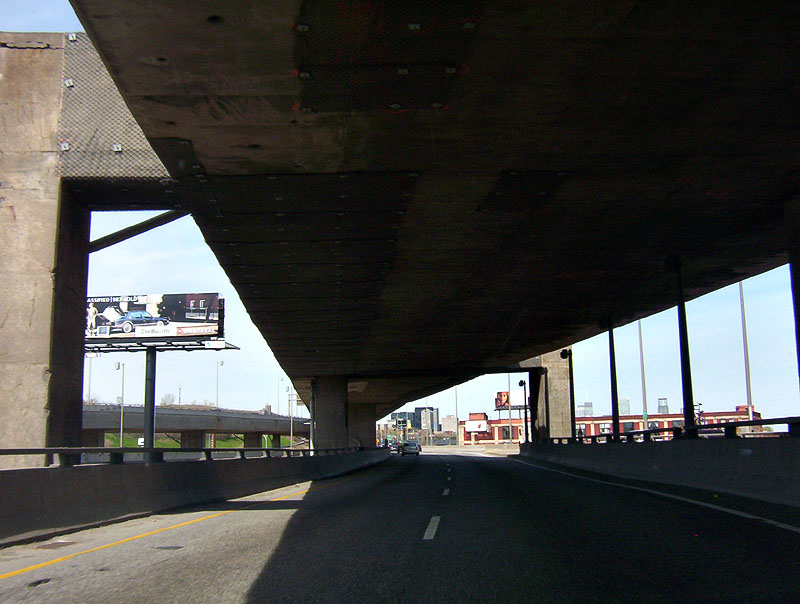
Near end of interchange

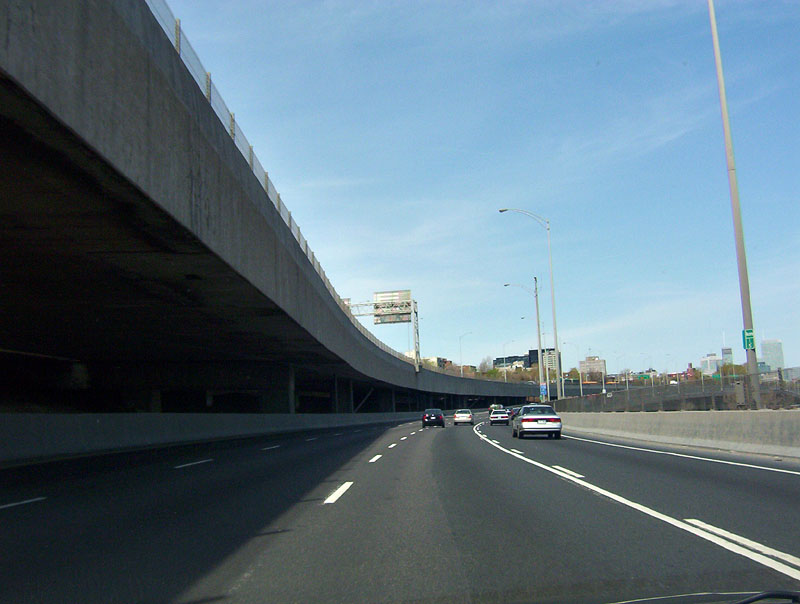
Ville-Marie expressway, after lanes merge from Décarie

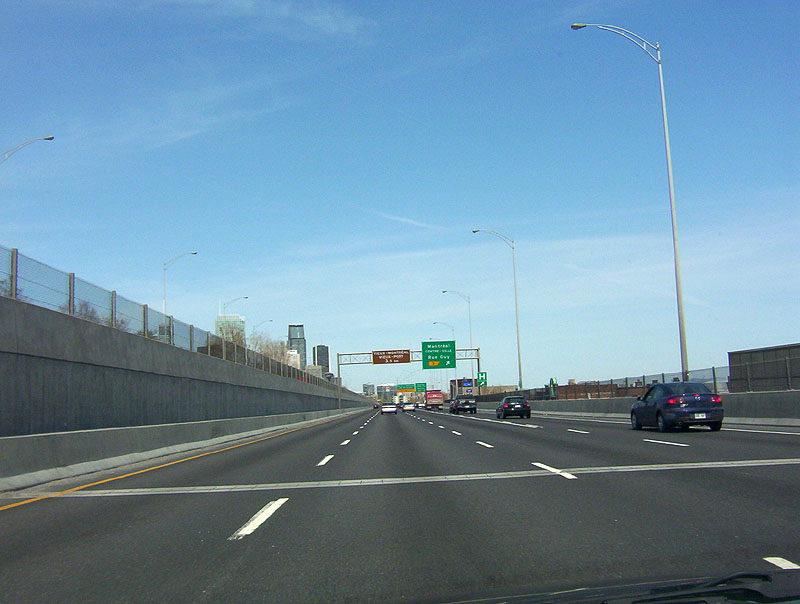
Rue Guy exit

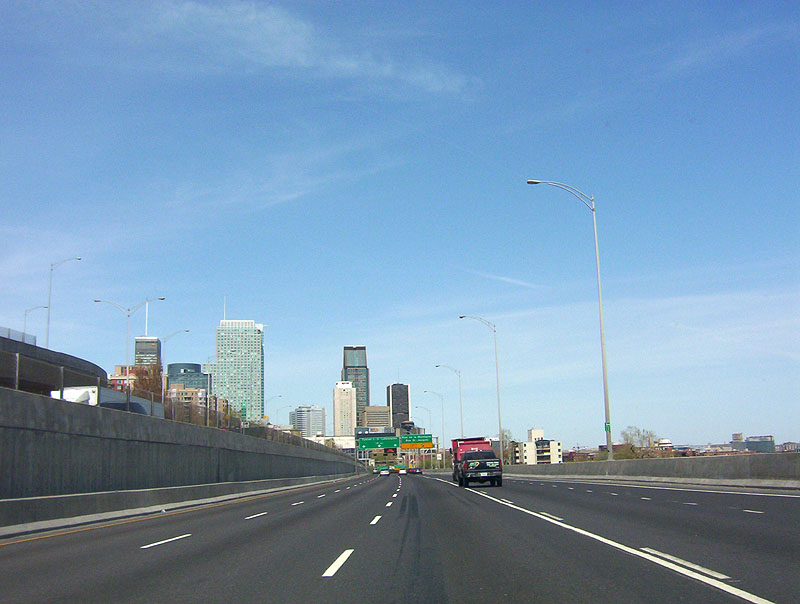
Rue St-Jacques/Rue de la Montagne exit

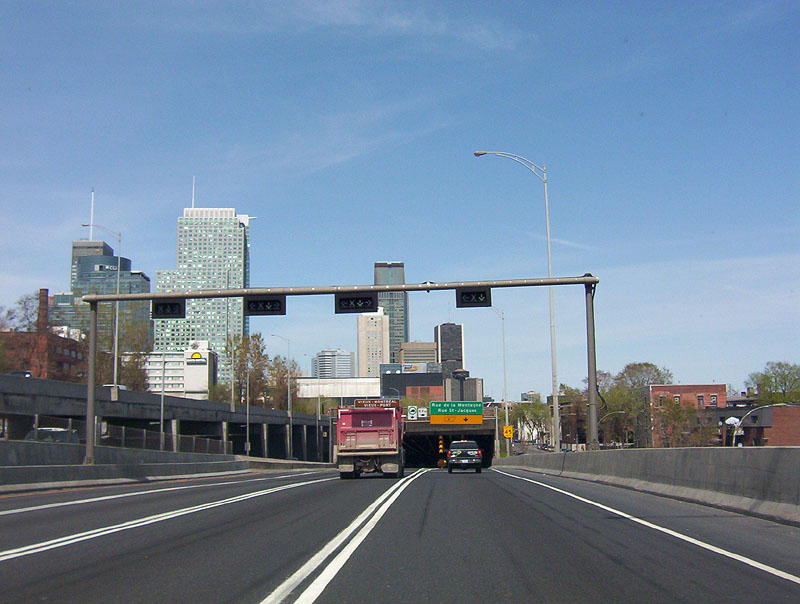
Beginning of tunnel

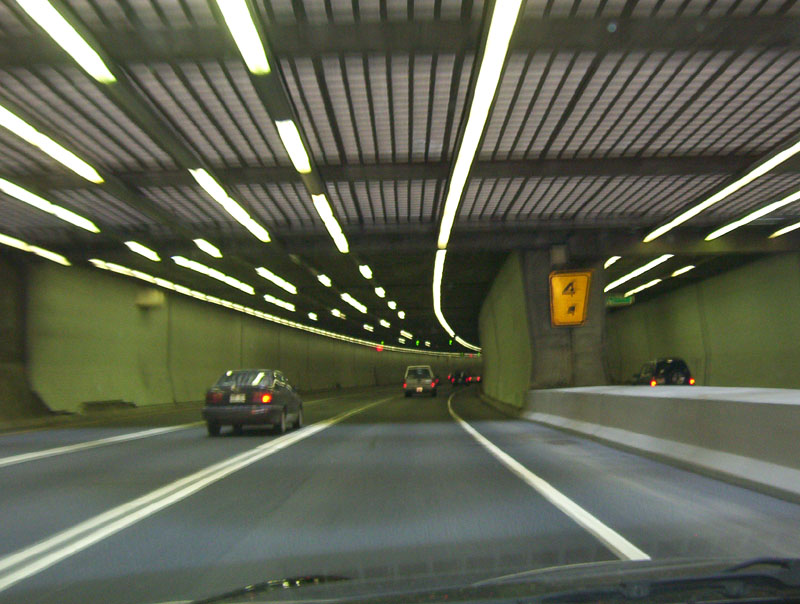
Entering the tunnel

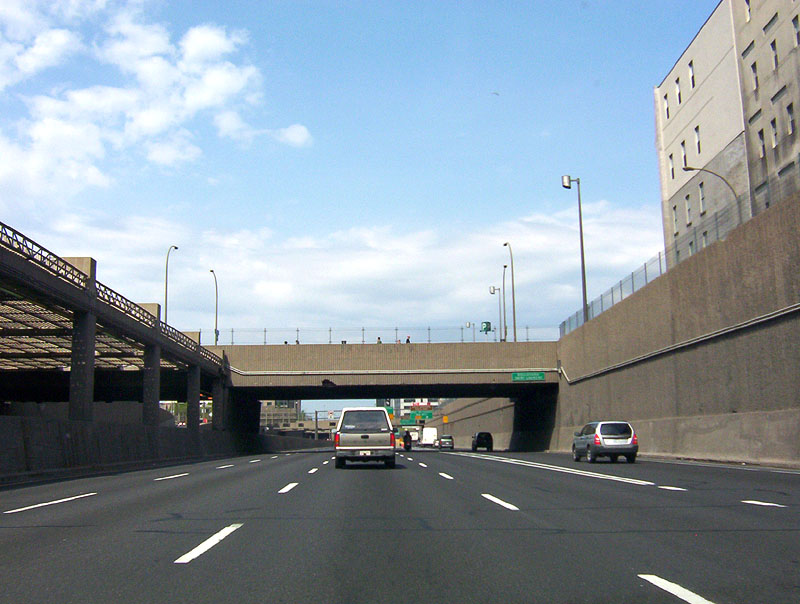
East of Palais des Congrès

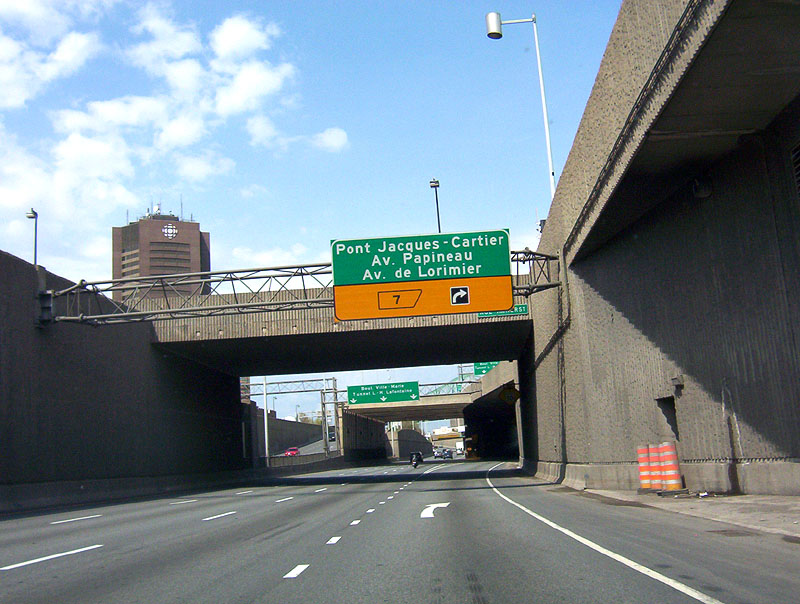
Pont Jacques-Cartier exit

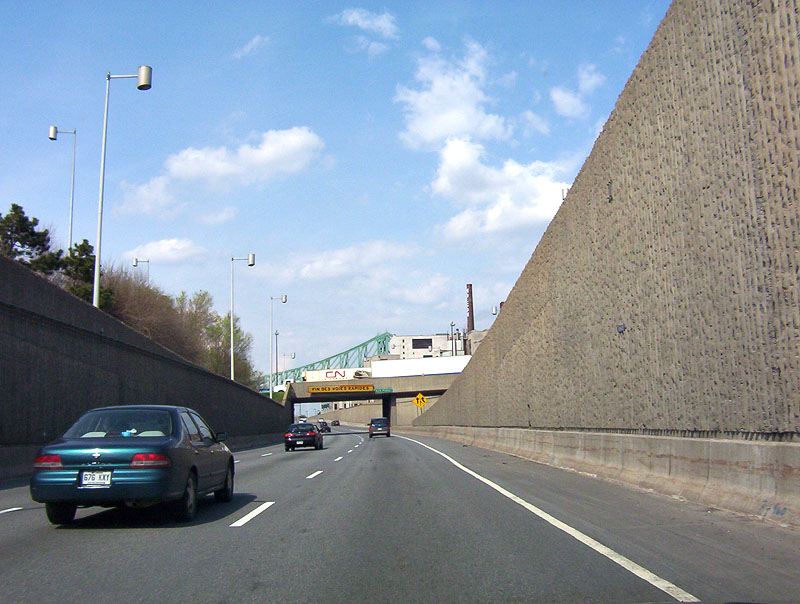
Near eastern terminus

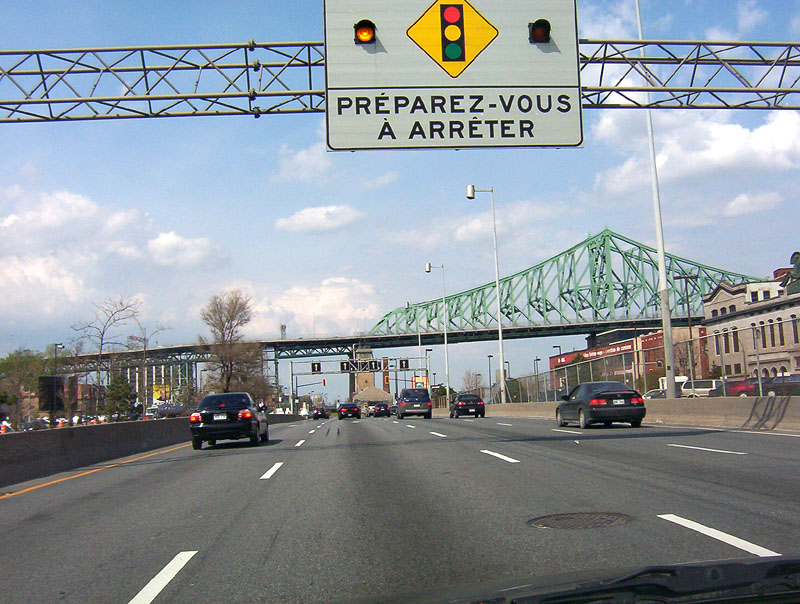
Highway at Ville-Marie boulevard

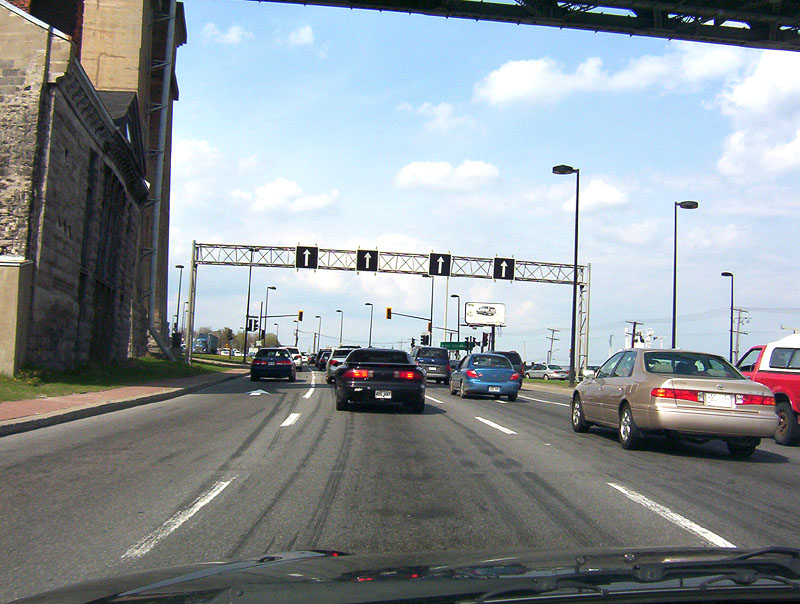
Terminus at Notre-Dame
