= Quebec Autoroute 540 =

Highway in Quebec City, Quebec

Autoroute 540
- Autoroute Duplessis
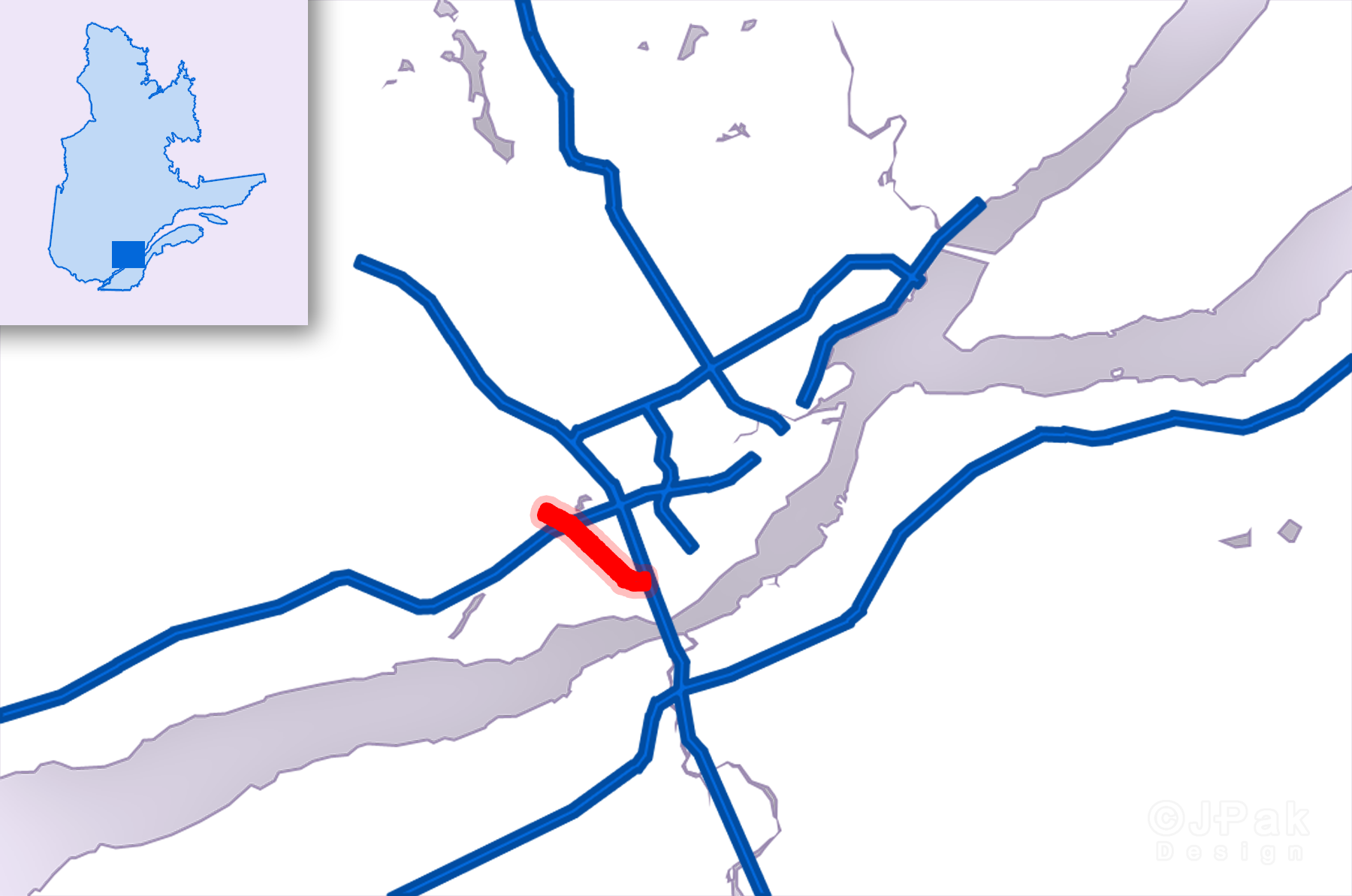

Route information
- Maintained by Transports Québec
- Length: 5.1 km (3.2 mi)
- Existed: 1966–present

Major junctions
- South end: A-73 / R-175 in Québec
- A-40 in Québec
- North end: R-138 in Québec

Location
- Country: Canada
- Province: Quebec
- Major cities: Québec City

Highway system
- Quebec provincial highways; Autoroutes; List; Former
← A-530	→ A-573

Autoroute 540 is a short spur highway, connecting Route 138 to Autoroute 73 and linking the Jean Lesage International Airport with the Pierre Laporte Bridge. It is also known as Autoroute Duplessis, honouring former premier Maurice Duplessis.

== Exit list ==
Exit numbers on Autoroute 540 are numbered from north to south, unlike other Autoroutes which are numbered from south to north. The entire route is located in Québec City, Québec TE.

km	mi	Exit	Destinations	Notes
0.0	0.0	–	Boulevard Laurier (R-175 north) – Québec Centre-Ville	A-540 southern terminus; through traffic follows R-175 north
0.0	0.0	10	R-175 south / Chemin Saint-Louis – Pont de Québec	
0.0	0.0	9	A-73 south to A-20 – Pont Pierre-Laporte, Montréal	A-73 north exit 134; A-73 south exit 136; no exit to A-73 north
0.6	0.37	8	Boulevard Hochelaga	
1.3	0.81	6	Chemin des Quatre-Bourgeois	
2.0	1.2	5	Chemin Sainte-Foy	
4.0	2.5	3	A-40 (Autoroute Félix-Leclerc) to A-440 – Québec Centre-Ville, Montréal	Signed as exits 3E (east) and 3O (west); A-40 exit 305
4.9	3.0	–	Avenue Jules-Verne	At-grade intersection; terminus of freeway section
5.4	3.4	–	Boulevard Wilfred-Hammel (R-138) – Québec, Trois-Rivières	At-grade intersection; A-540 northern terminus; becomes Route de l'Aéroport
7.1	4.4		Aéroport Jean-Lesage	
9.2	5.7		Avenue Notre Dame (R-358)	
1.000 mi = 1.609 km; 1.000 km = 0.621 mi: Closed/former; Incomplete access
