= Quebec Autoroute 740 =

Highway in Quebec

Autoroute 740
- Autoroute Robert-Bourassa

Route information
- Maintained by Transports Québec
- Length: 7.4 km (4.6 mi)
- Existed: 1975–present

Major junctions
- South end: R-175 in Québec
- A-440 in Québec; A-40 / A-73 in Québec
- North end: Boulevard Lebourgneuf in Québec

Location
- Country: Canada
- Province: Quebec
- Major cities: Québec

Highway system
- Quebec provincial highways; Autoroutes; List; Former
← A-730	→ A-930

Autoroute 740 is a Quebec Autoroute in metropolitan Quebec City, Canada. A spur route of Autoroute 40, the A-740 runs for 7.3 km (4.5 mi) on a north-south axis (parallel to the St. Lawrence River) through the boroughs of Sainte-Foy–Sillery–Cap-Rouge and Les Rivières, with interchanges at the A-440 at exit 4 and the A-40 at exit 9.

Originally named the Autoroute du Vallon for the 17th century road it replaced, in 2006, the Quebec government under then-Premier Jean Charest renamed the highway Autoroute Robert-Bourassa, in honour of a long serving former Quebec Premier.

== Route description ==
The A-740 begins at an intersection with Route 175 (Also called Boulevard Laurier) in suburban Quebec City, tracing the western limits of Université Laval along the northbound lanes and Place Sainte-Foy (a regional shopping mall) along the southbound lanes. Once past the university, the A-740 enters a 300 m tunnel, passing under heavily travelled chemin Sainte-Foy and chemin Quatre-Bourgeois. Passing to the west of Cégep de Sainte-Foy, the A-740 approaches the interchange with the A-440 at exit 4. From here, motorists on the A-440 can travel east (which becomes Boulevard Charest) towards the city centre or west to an interchange with the A-40 and A-73, affording access to Jean Lesage International Airport and points south and west.

Continuing north, the A-740 passes to the west of an industrial park, meets Route 138 at exit 7, then crosses the Saint-Charles River to an interchange with Boulevard Père-Lelièvre at exit 8 on the north shore. The autoroute provides the eastern boundary for a municipal park before meeting the A-40/A-73 (a concurrent route) at a cloverleaf interchange. The A-740 ends shortly after the A-40/A-73 interchange, passing to the west of the Galeries de la Capitale (another regional shopping mall) to an intersection with Boulevard Lebourgneuf.

The original plans called for the A-740 to continue northward after the first section opened in 1982, and so the government preserved the autoroute's intended path. Instead, in 2006, an urban boulevard (Boulevard Robert-Bourassa) was opened on this right of way, running for 4.5 km (2.8 mi) from the northern terminus of the A-740 to Route 369 (Boulevard Bastien). This new route was intended to provide an alternative to the heavily travelled Boulevard St. Jacques (which it parallels).

== Exit list ==
The entire route is located in Quebec City, Québec TE.

km	mi	Exit	Destinations	Notes
0.0	0.0	–	Boulevard Laurier (R-175)	At-grade intersection; A-740 southern terminus
0.4	0.25	–	Boulevard Hachelaga	At-grade intersection
0.8	0.50	2	Université Laval	
1.3	0.81	3	Chemin des Quatre-Bourgeois / Chemin Sainte-Foy	Northbound exit and southbound entrance
1.3– 1.5	0.81– 0.93	Robert Bourassa Tunnel		
1.5	0.93	3	Chemin des Quatre-Bourgeois / Chemin Sainte-Foy	Southbound exit and northbound entrance
2.2– 3.4	1.4– 2.1	4-E	A-440 east (Boulevard Charest) / Boulevard du Versant – Québec Centre-Ville	A-440 exit 15
2.2– 3.4	1.4– 2.1	4-O	A-440 west (Autoroute Charest) to A-40 west – Aéroport Jean-Lesage, Pont Pierre-Laporte	A-440 exit 15
2.2– 3.4	1.4– 2.1	4-O	Rue Cyrille-Duquet	Northbound exit
2.2– 3.4	1.4– 2.1	6	Rue Jacard / Rue Léon-Harmel / Rue Cyrille-Duquet	Southbound exit
4.2	2.6	7	Boulevard Wilfred-Hamel (R-138)	
4.8	3.0	8	Boulevard Pére Leliévre	
6.3	3.9	9	A-40 / A-73 – Sainte-Anne-de-Beaupré, Saguenay, Montréal, Pont Pierre-Laporte, Aéroport Jean-Lesage	Signed as exits 9-E (east) and 9-O (west); A-40 / A-73 exit 310
7.4	4.6	–	Boulevard Lebourgneuf	At-grade intersection; A-740 northern terminus; becomes Boulevard Robert-Bourassa
9.7	6.0	–	Avenue Chauveau (R-358)	At-grade intersection
11.6	7.2	–	Boulevard Bastien (R-369) / Boulevard de la Colline	At-grade intersection; continues as Boulevard de la Colline
1.000 mi = 1.609 km; 1.000 km = 0.621 mi: Closed/former; Incomplete access
