= Quebec Route 175 =

Highway in Quebec

Route 175

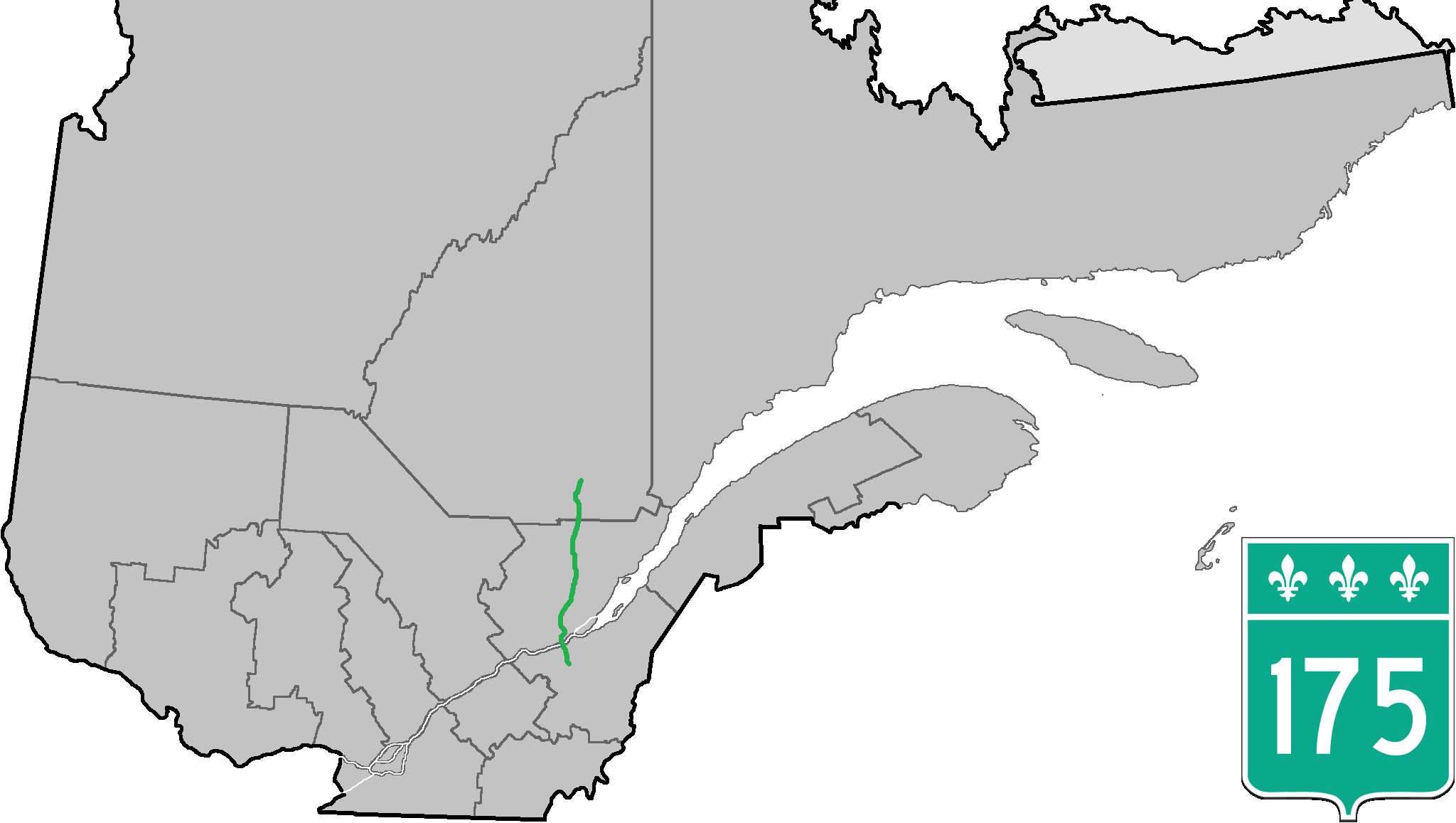

Route information
- Maintained by Transports Québec
- Length: 243.3 km (151.2 mi)

Major junctions
- South end: R-218 in Saint-Lambert-de-Lauzon
- A-73 in Saint-Étienne-de-Lauzon; A-20 (TCH) / R-132 in Lévis; A-40 / A-73 / A-440 / A-540 in Quebec City; A-740 / A-973 / R-136 / R-138 in Quebec City; R-169 near L'Etape; A-70 / R-170 in Saguenay
- North end: R-172 in Saguenay

Location
- Country: Canada
- Province: Quebec
- Major cities: Quebec City, Lévis, Saguenay

Highway system
- Quebec provincial highways; Autoroutes; List; Former
← R-173	→ R-191

Route 175 is a major north–south highway on both sides of the St. Lawrence River in Quebec, Canada. Its southern terminus is in Saint-Lambert-de-Lauzon at the junction of Route 218 and its northern terminus is in Saguenay at the junction of Route 172, in the former city of Chicoutimi. Route 175 crosses the Saint Lawrence River on the Quebec Bridge, and a little further north of downtown Quebec City, it merges with Autoroute 73, continuing with Autoroute standards for about 45 km and continuing going the Laurentides Wildlife Reserve as a divided highway towards Saguenay.

== Description ==
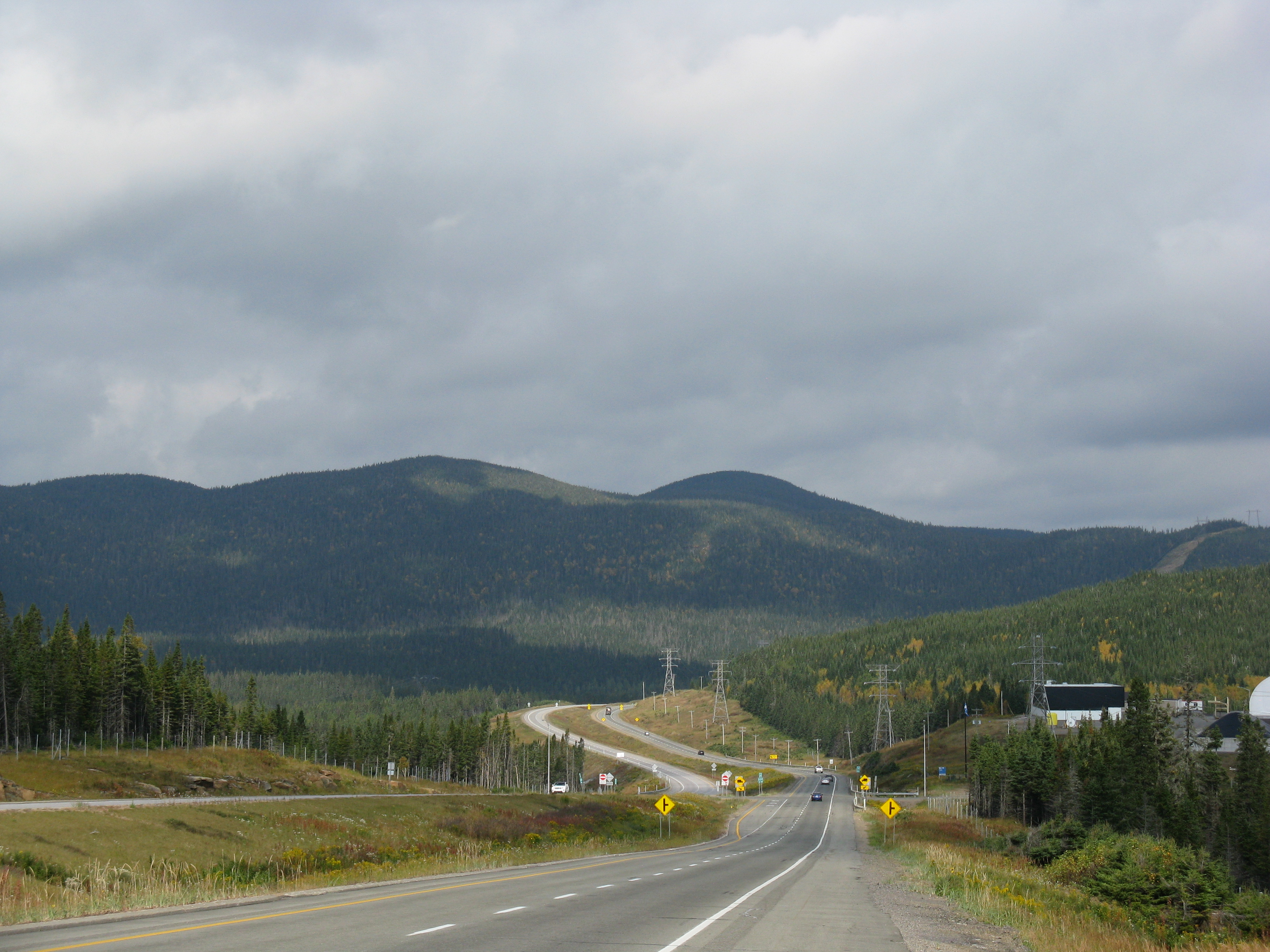
Route 175 with Mont François-De-Laval in the background

Part of Route 175 is built to autoroute standards; the major part of that autoroute portion, also known as Autoroute Laurentienne, overlaps Autoroute 73. However the southern extremity of Autoroute Laurentienne, which is not part of A-73, is also designated as Autoroute 973.

The stretch of highway between Stoneham and Saguenay was considered one of the most dangerous highways in the province due to it being two-lane and subject to poor weather conditions. Collisions, including those with moose, are not uncommon. After lengthy negotiations between the Québec and federal governments to fund the project, work was begun to completely rebuild Route 175 as a four-lane dual carriageway. It was started in 2003 and completed in September 2013.

Halfway between Quebec City and Saguenay is L'Étape, a rest area and campground featuring a gas station, restaurant and dépanneur.

== Municipalities ==
- Saint-Lambert-de-Lauzon
- Levis
- Quebec City
- Stoneham-et-Tewkesbury
- Saguenay

== Major intersections ==
RCM	Location	km	mi	Exit	Destinations	Notes
La Nouvelle-Beauce	Saint-Lambert-de-Lauzon	0.0	0.0		R-218 / A-73 – Saint-Gilles, Saint-Henri-de-Lévis	R-175 southern terminus
Lévis		9.0	5.6		A-73 – Québec, Saint-Georges	A-73 exit 123
Lévis		19.0	11.8		A-20 (TCH) to A-73 – Montreal, Québec, Pont Pierre-Laporte, Rivière-du-Loup	A-20 exit 314
Lévis		19.6	12.2		R-132 east (Boulevard Guillaume-Couture) – Lévis Centre-Ville	R-175 follows Boulevard Guillaume-Couture; south end of R-132 concurrency
Lévis		21.3	13.2		R-132 west (Route Marie-Victorin) – Saint-Antoine-de-Tilly	Interchange; north end of R-132 concurrency; northbound U-turn
St. Lawrence River		21.5– 22.5	13.4– 14.0	Pont de Québec (Quebec Bridge)		
Québec	Québec	22.9	14.2	22	Boulevard Champlain (R-136 east) / Avenue des Hôtels	Interchange; R-175 becomes Boulevard Laurier; northbound exit and southbound entrance
Québec	Québec	23.3	14.5	23	Chemin Saint-Louis	Interchange
Québec	Québec	23.7– 24.3	14.7– 15.1	–	A-73 (Autoroute Henri-IV) – Pont Pierre-Laporte; A-540 north (Autoroute Duplessis) – Aéroport Jean-Lesage	A-540 southern terminus; A-73 exit 134; A-540 exit 10; no exit from A-73 north to R-175 south or R-175 north to A-73 south
Québec	Québec	26.1	16.2		A-740 north (Autoroute Robert-Bourassa)	At-grade; A-740 southern terminus
Québec	Québec	28.9	18.0		Avenue Holland	R-175 becomes Grande Allée
Québec	Québec	32.3	20.1		Avenue Honoré-Mercier / Rue Saint-Louis	R-175 follows Avenue Honoré-Mercier; passes the Parliament Building of Quebec
Québec	Québec	32.9	20.4		To A-440 east (Autoroute Dufferin-Montmorency) / Côte d'Abraham	R-175 follows Côte d'Abraham
Québec	Québec	33.4	20.8		Rue Dorchester, Rue de la Couronne, Rue Saint-Vallier	One-way transition; R-175 north follows Rue de la Couronne; R-175 south follows Rue Dorchester
Québec	Québec	33.6	20.9		Boulevard Charest	Connects gap in A-440
Québec	Québec	34.2	21.3		Rue du Chalutier	Two-way traffic resumes
Québec	Québec	34.5	21.4		A-973 begins (Autoroute Laurentienne) / Rue de la Croix-Rouge, 4^{e} Rue, Pont Drouin, Rue du Cardinal-Maurice-Roy	At-grade; A-973 southern terminus and concurrency; distance markers follow Route 175, while exit numbers follow A-973
Québec	Québec	34.5	21.4	Autoroute Laurentienne southern terminus		
Québec	Québec	35.0	21.7	2	Rue Lee, Rue du Cardinal-Maurice-Roy	
Québec	Québec	35.3	21.9	3	Rue Bourdages	Southbound entrance and exit
Québec	Québec	35.9	22.3	4	Boulevard Wilfrid-Hamel (R-138)	Southbound signed as 4-O (west) and 4-E (east)
Québec	Québec	36.5	22.7	5	Rue Soumande	
Québec	Québec	36.9	22.9	6	Boulevard des Cèdres	Northbound entrance and exit
Québec	Québec	37.9	23.5	7; 148	A-40 / A-73 south (Autoroute Félix Leclerc) / A-973 ends – Montréal, Jean Lesage International Airport, Pont P.-Laporte, Sainte-Anne-de-Beaupre	A-973 northern terminus and concurrency; south end of A-73 concurrency; northbound signed as exits 7-E (east) and 7-O (west); southbound signed as exits 148-E (east) and 148-O (west); A-40 / A-73 north exit 313; exit numbers follow A-73, while distance markers continue following R-175
Québec	Québec	39.2	24.4	149	Boulevard de l'Atrium, Boulevard Lebourgneuf	
Québec	Québec	40.2	25.0	150	Boulevard Louis-XIV (R-369)	
Québec	Québec	41.7	25.9	151	Boulevard Jean-Talon	
Québec	Québec	44.5	27.7	154	Rue de la Faune, Wendake	
Québec	Québec	45.5	28.3	155	Rue Georges-Muir	
Québec	Québec	46.4	28.8	156	Rue Bernier	Northbound exit and entrance
Québec	Québec	47.2	29.3	157	Boulevard du Lac – Lac-Beauport	Northbound entrance via exit 156
Québec	Québec	48.6	30.2	158	Rue Jacques-Bédard	Southbound exit is via exit 159
Québec	Québec	48.9	30.4	159	Boulevard Talbot	No northbound entrance
La Jacques-Cartier	Stoneham-et-Tewkesbury	56.9	35.4	167	R-371 south / A-73 ends – Stoneham-et-Tewkesbury, Lac-Delage	A-73 northern terminus and concurrency
La Jacques-Cartier	Stoneham-et-Tewkesbury	56.9	35.4	Autoroute Laurentienne northern terminus; freeway continues		
La Jacques-Cartier	Stoneham-et-Tewkesbury	59.4	36.9	169	Chemin des Frères-Wright, Chemin Crawford	
La Jacques-Cartier	Stoneham-et-Tewkesbury	64.1	39.8	174	Chemin Saint-Edmond, Saint-Adolphe	
La Jacques-Cartier	Stoneham-et-Tewkesbury	72.3	44.9	182	Chemin du Parc National – Jacques-Cartier National Park	Prohibition on pedestrians and cyclists ends past this exit
La Côte-de-Beaupré	Lac-Jacques-Cartier	132.0	82.0	L'Étape Rest Area		
Charlevoix	Lac-Pikauba	166	103	–	R-169 north – Alma, Roberval	Interchange
Le Fjord-du-Saguenay	No major junctions					
Saguenay		235.0	146.0		R-170 (Boulevard du Royaume Ouest) – Jonquière, La Baie	R-175 follows Boulevard Talbot
Saguenay		235.7	146.5		A-70 – Jonquière, La Baie, Bagotville Airport	A-70 exit 47
Saguenay		239.3	148.7		R-372 east (Boulevard de l'Université) / Boulevard Talbot	R-175 follows Boulevard de l'Université; south end of R-372 concurrency
Saguenay		241.5	150.1		Rue Saint-Paul / Boulevard Saint-Paul	R-175 / R-372 follow Boulevard Saint-Paul
Saguenay		242.4	150.6	–	R-372 west (Boulevard de l'Université) – Chicoutimi Centre-Ville, Jonquière	Interchange; south end of R-372 concurrency
Saguenay		242.5– 243.0	150.7– 151.0	Pont Dubuc crosses Rivière Saguenay		
Saguenay		243.3	151.2	–	R-172 (Boulevard Sainte-Geneviève, Boulevard de Tadoussac) / Rue Roussel – Alma, Tadoussac	Interchange; R-175 northern terminus
1.000 mi = 1.609 km; 1.000 km = 0.621 mi: Concurrency terminus; Incomplete access

== See also ==
- List of Quebec provincial highways
