= Quebec Autoroute 573 =

Highway in Quebec, Canada

Autoroute 573
- Autoroute Henri-IV (Henri IV Autoroute)

Route information
- Maintained by Transports Québec
- Length: 12.9 km (8.0 mi)
- Existed: 1976–present

Major junctions
- South end: A-73 / A-40 in Québec
- North end: R-369 in Québec

Location
- Country: Canada
- Province: Quebec
- Major cities: Quebec City

Highway system
- Quebec provincial highways; Autoroutes; List; Former
← A-540	→ A-610

Autoroute 573 is a short spur road located in Québec City, Quebec, connecting Autoroutes 73 and 40 to Route 369. It facilitates access to the CFB Valcartier military base.

The portion north of Avenue Industrielle is a two-lane super two-style road with signalized intersections.

== Exit list ==
The entire route is located in Québec City, Québec TE.

km	mi	Exit	Destinations	Notes
0.0	0.0	–	A-40 west / A-73 south (Autoroute Henri-IV) – Montréal, Pont Pierre-Laporte, Aéroport Jean-Lesage	Autoroute Henri-IV continues on A-40 west / A-73 south; A-40 east / A-73 north exit 142; A-40 west / A-73 south exit 307
0.0	0.0	1	A-40 east / A-73 north (Autoroute Félix-Leclerc) – Québec Centre-Ville, Sainte-Anne-de-Beaupré	Autoroute Henri-IV continues on A-40 west / A-73 south; A-40 east / A-73 north exit 142; A-40 west / A-73 south exit 307
2.3	1.4	2	Avenue Chauveau (R-358) – L'Ancienne-Lorette	
5.4	3.4	5	Rue Sainte-Geneviève (R-369) – Loretteville	
7.6	4.7	–	Avenue Industrielle	At-grade intersection
11.1	6.9	–	R-371 north (Rue de Montolieu) – Saint-Gabriel-de-Valcartier	At-grade intersection; southern terminus of R-371
12.9	8.0	–	R-369 (Boulevard Pie-XI) – Shannon, Sainte-Catherine-de-la-Jacques-Cartier	At-grade intersection; R-369 continues north
1.000 mi = 1.609 km; 1.000 km = 0.621 mi
