= Quebec Autoroute 73 =

Highway in Quebec

Autoroute 73
- Autoroute Robert-Cliche; Autoroute Laurentienne; Autoroute Henri-IV

Route information
- Maintained by Transports Québec
- Length: 122.4 km (76.1 mi)
- Existed: 1963–present

Major junctions
- South end: R-204 in Saint-Georges
- A-20 (TCH) in Lévis; A-540 in Quebec City; A-40 in Quebec City; A-440 in Quebec City; A-573 in Quebec City; A-740 in Quebec City; A-973 in Quebec City
- North end: R-175 / R-371 in Stoneham-et-Tewkesbury

Location
- Country: Canada
- Province: Quebec
- Major cities: Quebec City, Lévis, Saint-Georges, Sainte-Marie, Stoneham-et-Tewkesbury

Highway system
- Quebec provincial highways; Autoroutes; List; Former
← A-70	→ A-85

Autoroute 73 (or A-73) is an autoroute in Quebec, Canada. Following a northwest-southeast axis perpendicular to the St. Lawrence River, the A-73 provides an important freeway link with regions north and south of Quebec City, the capital of the province. It also intersects with Autoroute 20 (south of the river) and Autoroute 40 (north of the river) - one of only three Quebec autoroutes to do so. The A-73 begins less than 40 kilometres from the U.S. border in Quebec's Beauce region, traverses metropolitan Quebec City, and ends in the Laurentian Mountains. Civic, political, and business leaders in regions north and south of the A-73's termini have lobbied the Quebec government to extend the autoroute. While the four-laning of Route 175 to Saguenay has alleviated concerns in the north about safety and connectivity, Quebecers in the Beauce continue to advocate for extending the A-73 to the U.S. border, towards the Armstrong–Jackman Border Crossing and U.S. Route 201 within Maine.

== Description ==
=== Autoroute Robert-Cliche ===
The southernmost section of the A-73 is named in honour of Robert Cliche. A lawyer, politician, and judge from Quebec's Beauce region, Cliche also served as head of the Quebec branch of the New Democratic Party.

The A-73 begins at a roundabout junction with Route 204 in Saint-Georges, tracing the course of the Chaudière River to its junction with Autoroute 20 in Lévis. Along the way, the A-73 connects the largest cities and towns in Quebec's historic Beauce region. Exit numbers on the A-73 begin at km 43 (which accounts for an as-yet unbuilt section to the Maine border). Initially, much of the A-73 south of the Saint Lawrence River was built as a super-two (one lane in each direction) highway with no median. Work to expand the autoroute to four lanes was completed in 2016. Motorists wishing to continue southward to Maine must currently travel on Route 173, a two-lane highway.

Approaching metropolitan Quebec City, the A-73 meets the A-20 (co-signed as a section of the Trans-Canada Highway) at an interchange just south of the Saint Lawrence River. From here, motorists can take the A-20 east to Rivière-du-Loup, Rimouski, and the Gaspé Peninsula; and west to Montreal, Toronto, and Ottawa (via the A-40 and Ontario Highway 417).

The A-73 crosses the Saint Lawrence via the Pierre Laporte Bridge—the longest suspension bridge in Canada.

=== Autoroute Henri-IV ===
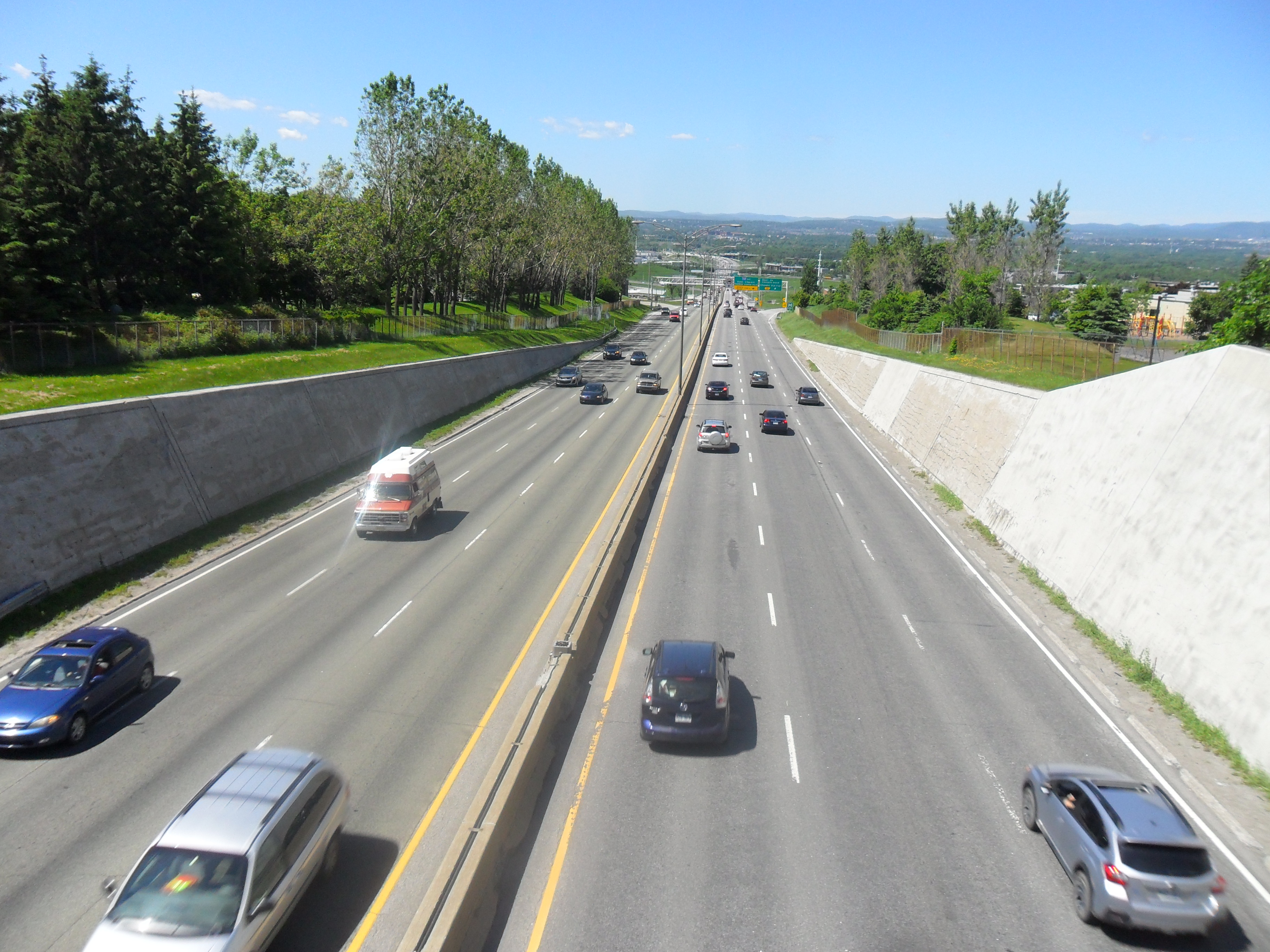
Autoroute Henri-IV

North of the river, the A-73 is named for Henri IV (Henri-Quatre), King of France at the time of the city of Québec's founding in 1608.

The A-73 provides a partial beltway around metropolitan Quebec to the west and north of the central city. At kilometre 134, the A-73 intersects with the A-540, a spur route connecting the A-73 and A-40 with the approach to Jean-Lesage International Airport.

At kilometre 139, the A-73 meets the A-40 and A-440. From here, motorists can take the A-40 west to Trois-Rivières and Montreal, or the A-440 east to Quebec City centre. North of this interchange, A-73 is signed as a concurrency with the A-40 for 10 km (6.2 mi).

=== Autoroute Félix Leclerc ===
Once co-signed with the A-40, the A-73 assumes the name assigned to the A-40. Leclerc was a singer-songwriter, poet, writer, actor and political activist.

The A-73/40 continues north for three kilometres to a junction with Autoroute 573, a spur route that provides access to the CFB Valcartier military base. At this intersection, the A-73/40 exit the autoroute, which continues as the A-573. From here, the A-73/40 continues due east, bypassing Quebec City to the north. Whereas the A-73/40 uses A-73 distance-based exit numbers prior to the junction with the A-573, past this point, A-40 distance based exit numbers are used. (This anomaly reflects an unbuilt section of the A-40, which would have started at Saint-Augustin-de-Desmaures, bypassed Jean-Lesage Airport to the north, and connected with the present-day A-73/40 at the A-573 interchange.)

The A-73/40 intersects with the A-740 (a spur route connecting Quebec City with the northern suburbs) at exit 310.

At exit 313, A-73 exits the autoroute at a clovermill interchange. North of the junction, the A-73 continues through Quebec City's northern suburbs. South of the junction, the autoroute is signed as Autoroute 973. The A-973 is a spur route which terminates just north of Quebec City centre. The A-40 continues eastward for another ten kilometres to a terminus with the A-440 just east of the city centre.

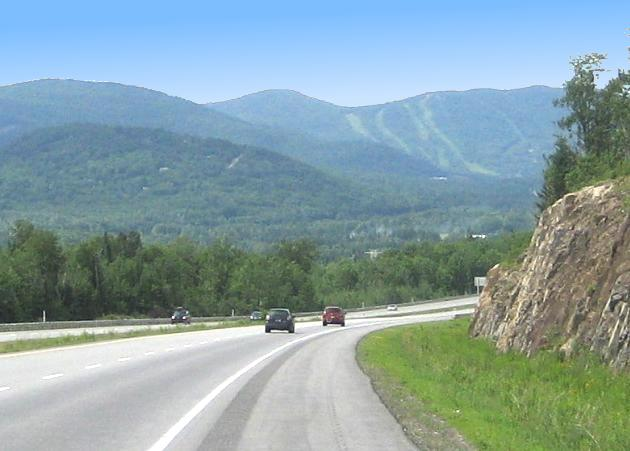
View of A-73 in Stoneham-et-Tewkesbury

=== Autoroute Laurentienne ===
The most northerly section of the A-73 is named for the Laurentian Mountains, a popular destination for outdoor sports north of Quebec City.

After the split with the A-40, the A-73 enters the foothills of the Laurentians. The autoroute provides access to the Stoneham Mountain Resort at kilometre 167 and bypasses Stoneham and Tewkesbury to the east. This stretch is cosigned with Route 175. The A-73 ends at Route 371 in Stoneham. The road continues as Route 175, which provides a link between Quebec City and the Saguenay-Lac-Saint-Jean region to the north (remaining as a freeway through kilometre 184, although that is not signed as A-73).

== Future ==
=== Chaudière-Appalaches ===
Community leaders continue to press for Transports Québec to extend the A-73 south to the Maine border. The issue resurfaced during a 2015 by-elections in Beauce-Sud, when Coalition Avenir Québec leader François Legault announced his support for extending the A-73 to Maine as a priority for his party if elected. For its part, Maine continues to debate private financing, construction, and operation of a proposed East-West Highway linking Quebec with the Maritime Provinces, possibly through Calais, Maine, very near where New Brunswick Route 1 has had its western terminus since October 2012. The proposed route, however, would involve connecting with an extended section of Autoroute 10, not the A-73, with the Autoroute 10 crossing some 57 km (35 mi) southwest of it. Maine currently has no plans to convert U.S. Route 201 to Interstate standards, which would provide an all-freeway connection from Quebec City to Interstate 95.

=== Capitale-Nationale ===
Between 2003 and 2013, the governments of Quebec and Canada co-funded reconstruction of Route 175 into a partially-controlled access freeway between the end of A-73 in Stoneham and the junction with the A-70 in Saguenay. This prompted speculation that the A-73 designation would be extended further northward into the Saguenay-Lac-Saint-Jean region. As the reconstructed Route 175 (except for the first 17 km north of the current A-73 terminus) is not fully a controlled-access highway, it does not meet Autoroute design standards. Thus, A-73's terminus remains at Stoneham unless and until corresponding sections of Route 175 are upgraded to controlled-access freeway. Quebec Autoroute 70 remains the only autoroute in Quebec that does not directly connect to any other.

== Exit list ==
RCM	Location	km	mi	Exit	Destinations	Notes
Beauce-Sartigan	Saint-Théophile	−43.0	−26.7	–	US 201 south / SR 6 south – Waterville, Augusta	Continuation into Maine
Beauce-Sartigan	Saint-Théophile	−43.0	−26.7	Canada–United States border at Armstrong–Jackman Border Crossing		
Beauce-Sartigan	Saint-Georges	−6.6	−4.1	37	R-173	Future southern terminus; future roundabout
Beauce-Sartigan	Saint-Georges	0.0	0.0	43	R-204 to R-173 / US 201 – Saint-Prosper, Saint-Georges, Maine (USA)	Roundabout; A-73 & Autoroute Robert-Cliche southern terminus; 41 km (25 mi) to Canada/US border
Beauce-Sartigan	Saint-Georges	5.3	3.3	48	74^{e} Rue	
Beauce-Sartigan	Notre-Dame-des-Pins	10.0	6.2	53	Notre-Dame-des-Pins, Beauceville, Saint-Simon-les-Mines	
Beauce-Centre	Beauceville	17.9	11.1	61	Beauceville, Saint-Odilon-de-Cranbourne, Lac-Etchemin	
Beauce-Centre	Saint-Joseph-de-Beauce	28.4	17.6	72	R-276 – Saint-Odilon-de-Cranbourne, Lac-Etchemin, Saint-Joseph-de-Beauce	
La Nouvelle-Beauce	Saints-Anges – Vallée-Jonction boundary	37.3	23.2	81	R-112 – Vallée-Jonction, Thetford Mines, Saints-Anges, Frampton	
La Nouvelle-Beauce	Sainte-Marie	46.8	29.1	91	Route Carter – Sainte-Marie Centre Ville, Sainte-Marguerite, Saint-Elzéar	
La Nouvelle-Beauce	Sainte-Marie	50.9	31.6	95	Route Cameron – Sainte-Marie Centre Ville, Sainte-Marguerite, Saint-Elzéar	
La Nouvelle-Beauce	Scott	56.9	35.4	101	R-173 – Scott, Saint-Bernard, Sainte-Hénédine, Saint-Henri	
La Nouvelle-Beauce	Saint-Isidore	63.7	39.6	108	Saint-Isidore	
La Nouvelle-Beauce	Saint-Lambert-de-Lauzon	70.9	44.1	115	R-218 – Saint-Lambert-de-Lauzon, Saint-Henri, Saint-Gilles	
Lévis		78.3	48.7	123	R-175 (Avenue St-Augustin)	
Lévis		79.6	49.5	124	Chemin Saint-Gregoire	
Lévis		83.7	52.0	128	Route Beaulieu	
Lévis		85.9	53.4	130	Rue du Parc-des-Chutes – Chutes de la Chaudière	
Lévis		86.2– 87.7	53.6– 54.5	131	A-20 (TCH) – Montreal, Pont de Québec, Lévis Centre-Ville, Rivière-du-Loup	Signed as exits 131-E (east) and 131-O (west); A-20 exit 312; access to R-132 / R-175
St. Lawrence River		88.4– 89.8	54.9– 55.8	Pont Pierre-Laporte North end of Autoroute Robert-Cliche • South end of Autoroute Henri-IV		
Québec	Québec	90.2	56.0	132	Boulevard Champlain (R-136 east), Avenue des Hôtels	
Québec	Québec	90.6	56.3	133	Chemin Saint-Louis	Northbound exit
Québec	Québec	90.7– 91.9	56.4– 57.1	134	A-540 north (Autoroute Duplessis) to A-40 – Montréal, Aéroport Jean-Lesage; Boulevard Laurier (R-175 north) – Québec Centre-Ville	Sorthbound signed as exits 134-E (east) and 134-O (west); southbound signed with exit 136; A-540 exit 9
Québec	Québec	90.7– 91.9	56.4– 57.1	136	Boulevard Hochelaga	
Québec	Québec	90.7– 91.9	56.4– 57.1	136	Boulevard Laurier (R-175 south) – Pont de Québec, Chemin Saint-Louis	Southbound exit
Québec	Québec	92.3	57.4	137	Chemin des Quatre-Bourgeois	
Québec	Québec	93.5	58.1	138	Chemin Sainte-Foy, Boulevard du Versant-Nord	
Québec	Québec	94.4	58.7	139	A-40 west / Boulevard Charest (A-440 east) – Montreal, Aéroport Jean-Lesage, Quebec Centre-Ville	South end of A-40 concurrency; signed as exits 139-E (east) and 139-O (west); exit 307 on A-40; exit 12 on A-440
Québec	Québec	95.2	59.2	140	Rue Einstein	Southbound shares exit with exit 139-O
Québec	Québec	96.5	60.0	141	Boulevard Wilfrid-Hamel (R-138)	
Québec	Québec	98.0	60.9	142 307	A-573 north (Autoroute Henri-IV) – Shannon	Autoroute Henri-IV follows A-573; A-40 / A-73 become Autoroute Félix Leclerc; signed as exit 142 (northbound) and exit 307 (southbound); exit numbers follow A-40
Québec	Québec	98.4	61.1	308	Boulevard Masson, Boulevard de l'Ormiere, Rue Armand-Viau	
Québec	Québec	99.6– 101.3	61.9– 62.9	310	A-740 (Autoroute Robert-Bourassa), Boulevard Saint-Jacques	A-740 exit 9
Québec	Québec	102.1	63.4	312	Boulevard Pierre-Bertrand (R-358)	Signed as exits 312-S (south) and 312-N (north)
Québec	Québec	103.4	64.2	313 148	A-40 east (Autoroute Félix-Leclerc) to R-138 – Sainte-Anne-de-Beaupre A-973 south / R-175 south (Autoroute Laurentienne) – Quebec Centre-Ville	North end of A-40 concurrency; south end of R-175 concurrency; northbound signed as exits 313-S (south) and 313-N (north); southbound signed as exits 148-O (west) and 148-E (east); becomes Autoroute Laurentienne; A-73 exit numbers resume, distance markers follow R-175
Québec	Québec	104.7	65.1	149	Boulevard de l'Atrium, Boulevard Lebourgneuf	
Québec	Québec	105.7	65.7	150	Boulevard Louis-XIV (R-369)	
Québec	Québec	107.2	66.6	151	Boulevard Jean-Talon	
Québec	Québec	110.0	68.4	154	Rue de la Faune, Wendake	
Québec	Québec	111.0	69.0	155	Rue Georges-Muir	
Québec	Québec	111.9	69.5	156	Rue Bernier	Northbound exit and entrance
Québec	Québec	112.7	70.0	157	Boulevard du Lac – Lac-Beauport	Northbound entrance via exit 156
Québec	Québec	114.1	70.9	158	Rue Jacques-Bédard	Southbound exit is via exit 159
Québec	Québec	114.4	71.1	159	Boulevard Talbot	No northbound entrance
La Jacques-Cartier	Stoneham-et-Tewkesbury	122.4	76.1	167	R-371 south – Stoneham-et-Tewkesbury, Lac-Delage	
La Jacques-Cartier	Stoneham-et-Tewkesbury	122.4	76.1	–	R-175 north – Saguenay	A-73 northern terminus; north end R-175 concurrency; R-175 continues north
1.000 mi = 1.609 km; 1.000 km = 0.621 mi: Concurrency terminus; Incomplete access

== See also ==
- Royal eponyms in Canada
