= A440 =

A440 or A-440 may refer to:

- A440 (pitch standard)
- A440 highway (Australia), a road in Victoria, Australia
- Quebec Autoroute 440 (Laval)
- Quebec Autoroute 440 (Quebec City)

== See also ==
- Apollo 440, an English band
- Airbus A400M, a military transport aircraft
- Archimedes 440, abbreviated to A440 - one of the Acorn Archimedes range of RISC computers
