= George Ranken =

George Ranken may refer to:

- George Ranken (soldier) (1828–1856), British soldier and author
- George Ranken (surveyor) (1827–1895), Scottish-born Australian surveyor, pastoralist and writer
