= Valcartier CTC grenade explosion =

1974 explosion in Quebec, Canada

- Location: Saint-Gabriel-de-Valcartier, Quebec, Canada
- Date: July 30, 1974
- Target: Cadets at Valcartier Cadet Training Centre
- Attack type: Accidental grenade explosion
- Weapon: M61 grenade
- Deaths: 6
- Injuries: 56
- Perpetrator: Canadian Forces (accidental)
- Motive: Accidental

The Valcartier CTC grenade explosion was an accidental grenade detonation that occurred on July 30, 1974 in Saint-Gabriel-de-Valcartier, resulting in six fatalities and fifty-six injuries. Valcartier Cadet Training Centre is situated inside CFB Valcartier, being used by the Canadian Cadet Organizations every summer for hosting of training courses, enhancing and supplementing in-corps training.

== Incident ==
Approximately one hundred thirty cadets were attending a lecture on recognizing explosive devices, part of the Explosive Safety course. The instructor, Captain Jean-Claude Giroux was presenting the lecture, and as part of the demonstration, a box of inert M61 grenades, blue in colour signalling their state, was circulated to the cadets for examination and handling. One of the grenades was green in colour, signalling its live status, however it was disregarded by those who noticed.

Upon receiving permission from Captain Giroux, one of the cadets pulled the pin from the green grenade, detonating it unknowingly. Two were instantly killed, four others died within the hour, and fifty six were injured.

The cadets were immediately evacuated, however many were left with the psychological wounds that lasted a lifetime, from the flesh and bones that were dispersed on them. Many were left with post-traumatic stress disorder.

== Investigation ==
A joint investigation was started by Sûreté du Québec and the Canadian Forces Military Police of which the findings were never made public. A Canadian Forces Board of Inquiry was also started, where 165 testimonies were given by cadets and instructors. The Board of Inquiry findings were also never made public.

A coroners inquiry determined that Captain Giroux was responsible for the fatalities and injuries. The inquiry recommended that Giroux be charged for negligence.

== Trial ==
After the recommendation from the coroners inquiry, Captain Giroux was charged with criminal negligence and pled not-guilty in the Court of Sessions of the Peace of Quebec. On June 21, 1977, Giroux was found not guilty by the court. It was not definitively determined how the live grenade made its way into the box of inert grenades. None of the other instructors were charged.

== Aftermath ==
After the incident, the Canadian Forces covered the funeral expenses for the six fatalities. However, other than the immediate medical care given to the cadets, the government did not cover any other expenses, such as long term medical care and psychological support.

The incident was swept under the rug by the Canadian Forces until 2015, when the Minister of National Defence authorized the Canadian Forces Ombudsman’s Office to conduct an investigation into the government’s response. Several recommendations were made by the Ombudsman in his report, including compensation, reforms, and others including funding a care plan for affected cadets.

== Resources ==
"As You Were: The Tragedy at Valcartier". by Gerry Fostaty, a survivor
