= Quebec Autoroute 440 (Quebec City) =

Highway in Quebec City, Quebec

Autoroute 440
- Autoroute Charest; Autoroute Dufferin-Montmorency

Route information
- Maintained by Transports Québec
- Length: 12.9 km (8.0 mi) Charest: 4.4 km (2.7 mi); Dufferin-Montmorency: 8.5 km (5.3 mi)
- Existed: 1962–present

Major junctions
- West end: A-40 / A-73 in Québec
- A-740 in Québec
- East end: A-40 in Québec

Location
- Country: Canada
- Province: Quebec
- Major cities: Quebec City

Highway system
- Quebec provincial highways; Autoroutes; List; Former
← A-440	→ A-520

Autoroute 440 (or A-440) is a superhighway located in Quebec City. It includes two separate segments, respectively named Autoroute Charest and Autoroute Dufferin-Montmorency. Originally meant to be connected and form a single continuous highway via a tunnel under the city centre (unused ramps were torn down at the western terminus of the Dufferin-Montmorency section in the late 2000s), these plans were shelved years ago and are not expected to be revived.

The designation of Autoroute Charest is derived from Boulevard Charest, which is the street continuation east of this segment of A-440.

== Route description ==
The Autoroute Charest segment is 4.5 km (2.8 mi) long. It begins at the junction of A-73 and A-40 and ends at Saint-Sacrement Avenue. Originally built as a two-lane freeway in 1962, it was twinned in 1967.

The roadway continues as Boulevard Charest into downtown Quebec, where A-440 traffic is directed along Rue Monseigneur-Gauvreau to reach the Autoroute Dufferin-Montmorency at its westernmost interchange (exit 21).

The Autoroute Dufferin-Montmorency is 8.5 km (5.3 mi) long. It begins at Côte de la Potasse, one block north of Route 175 (corner of Avenue Dufferin and Côte d'Abraham), and ends at the junction with A-40 in Beauport. The portion from Route 175 to Boulevard Henri-Bourassa (exit 23) was built in 1976 and the rest of the segment (exits 23 to 29) was built in 1982.

The autoroute was designated Dufferin-Montmorency because it extends former Avenue Dufferin (now Avenue Honoré-Mercier) in Quebec City and ends near the Montmorency Falls in Beauport. Lord Dufferin was a Governor General of Canada and had significant ties to Quebec City.

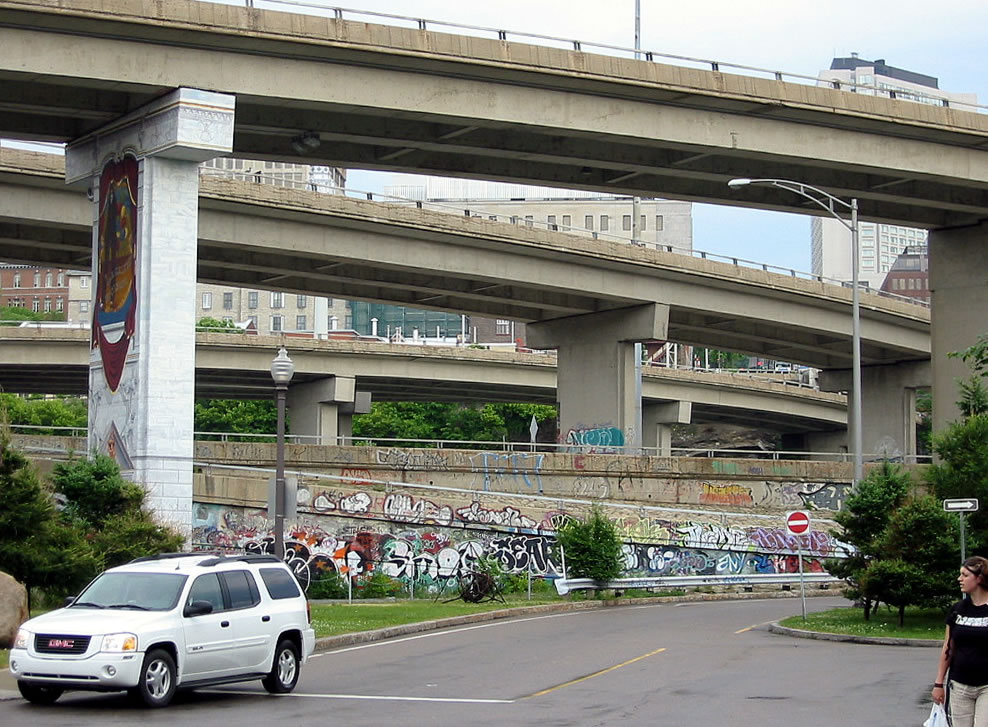
West end of Autoroute Dufferin-Montmorency

== Exit list ==
The entire route is located in Quebec City, Québec TE.

km	mi	Exit	Destinations	Notes
0.0	0.0	–	A-40 west (Autoroute Félix-Leclerc) – Montréal	Signed as exits 12S (south) and 12N (north); A-40 east exit 307; A-73 / A-40 west exit 139; continues as A-40 west
0.0	0.0	12	A-73 / A-40 east (Autoroute Henri-IV) – Pont Pierre-Laporte, Saguenay	Signed as exits 12S (south) and 12N (north); A-40 east exit 307; A-73 / A-40 west exit 139; continues as A-40 west
1.3– 2.9	0.81– 1.8	15	A-740 (Autoroute Robert-Bourassa) / Avenue Dalton / Avenue Watt / Rue Einstein	A-740 exit 4
4.2	2.6	–	Rue Cyrille-Duquet / Rue Frank-Carrel	At-grade intersection
4.5	2.8	–	Avenue Saint-Sacrement Boulevard Charest	At-grade intersection
Gap in A-440; connection made via Boulevard Charest
−0.1	−0.062		Avenue Honoré-Mercier / Rue d'Abraham (R-175)	Continues as Avenue Honoré-Mercier
0.0	0.0	–	Côte de la Potasse	At-grade intersection
0.8	0.50	21	Boulevard Charest	Left exit; westbound exit and eastbound entrance
0.9	0.56	Crosses the Saint-Charles River		
1.2	0.75	22	Boulevard des Capucins / Boulevard Jean-Lesage (R-136 west)	No eastbound exit to Boulevard Jean-Lesage; westbound exit part of exit 23
2.0	1.2	23	Boulevard Henri-Bourassa	
3.2	2.0	24	Avenue d'Estimauville	Eastbound exit part of exit 23
4.7	2.9	–	Boulevard François-de-Laval	At-grade intersection
6.1	3.8	27	Boulevard des Chutes / Rue du Manège	To R-138 (Boulevard Sainte-Anne)
8.5	5.3	29	A-40 west – Montréal, Aéroport Jean-Lesage	A-40 exit 323; continues as A-40 east
8.5	5.3	–	A-40 east to R-138 / R-368 – Île d'Orléans, Sainte-Anne-de-Beaupré	A-40 exit 323; continues as A-40 east
1.000 mi = 1.609 km; 1.000 km = 0.621 mi: Closed/former; Incomplete access
