= Quebec Route 367 =

Highway in Quebec, Canada

Route 367

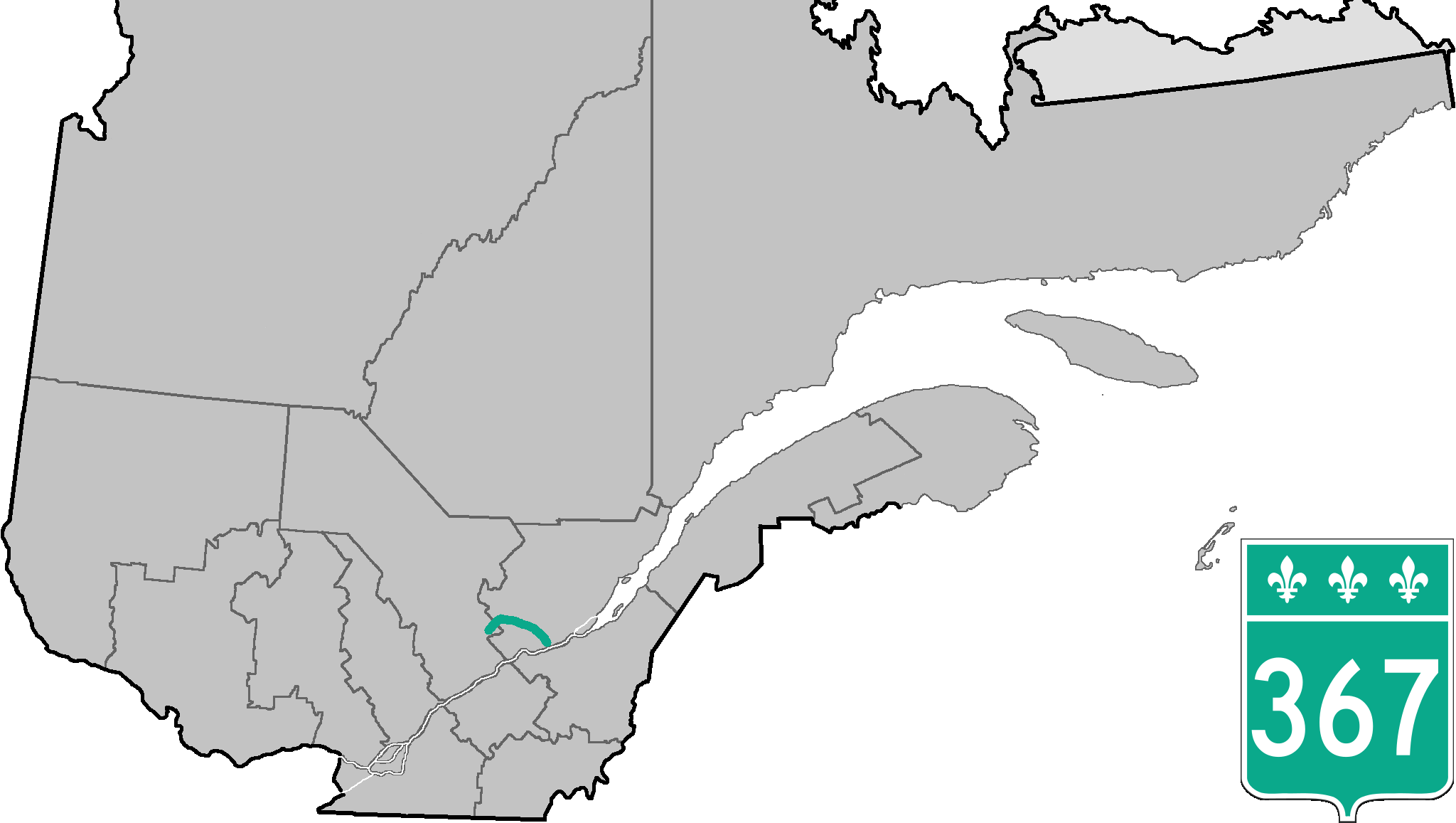

Route information
- Maintained by Transports Québec
- Length: 99.4 km (61.8 mi)

Major junctions
- North end: R-363 – Notre-Dame-de-Montauban
- A-40 – Saint-Augustin-de-Desmaures
- South end: R-138 – Saint-Augustin-de-Desmaures

Location
- Country: Canada
- Province: Quebec
- Major cities: Saint-Raymond-de-Portneuf, Saint-Augustin-de-Desmeures

Highway system
- Quebec provincial highways; Autoroutes; List; Former
| ← R-366 | → R-368 |

Route 367 is a 100 km two-lane north–south highway on the north shore of the Saint Lawrence River in Quebec, Canada. Although it is technically a north–south highway, long stretches of the road are east–west. Its northern/western terminus is close to Lac-aux-Sables at the junction of Route 363 and the southern/eastern terminus is in Saint-Augustin-de-Desmaures at the junction of Route 138. Route 367 used to end in Rivière-à-Pierre, but in the late 1990s, the stretch between Rivière-à-Pierre and the junction of Route 363 was added.

== Towns along Route 367 ==
- Notre-Dame-de-Montauban
- Rivière-à-Pierre
- Saint-Léonard-de-Portneuf
- Saint-Raymond
- Lac-Sergent
- Sainte-Catherine-de-la-Jacques-Cartier
- Saint-Augustin-de-Desmaures

== Major intersections ==
| RCM or ET | Municipality | Km | Road | Notes |
|---|---|---|---|---|
| Quebec | Saint-Augustin-de-Desmaures | 0.0 | R-138 | Southern terminus of Route 367 |
| Quebec | Saint-Augustin-de-Desmaures | 2.2 | A-40 | Exit 295 (A-40) |
| Quebec | Saint-Augustin-de-Desmaures | 5.2 | R-358 east | Southern terminus of Route 358 / Route 367 overlap |
| Quebec | Saint-Augustin-de-Desmaures | 8.1 | R-358 west | Northern terminus of Route 358 / Route 367 overlap |
| La Jacques-Cartier | Sainte-Catherine-de-la-Jacques-Cartier | 17.0 | R-369 | Northern terminus of Route 369 |
| La Jacques-Cartier | Sainte-Catherine-de-la-Jacques-Cartier | 18.3 | Route de Fossambault (To Fossambault-sur-le-Lac) | |
| Portneuf | Saint-Raymond | 38.4 | R-365 | Northern terminus of Route 365 |
| Portneuf | Rivière-à-Pierre | 71.2 | Rue Principale (To Rivière-à-Pierre) | |
| Mékinac | Notre-Dame-de-Montauban | 99.4 | R-363 | Northern terminus of Route 363 |

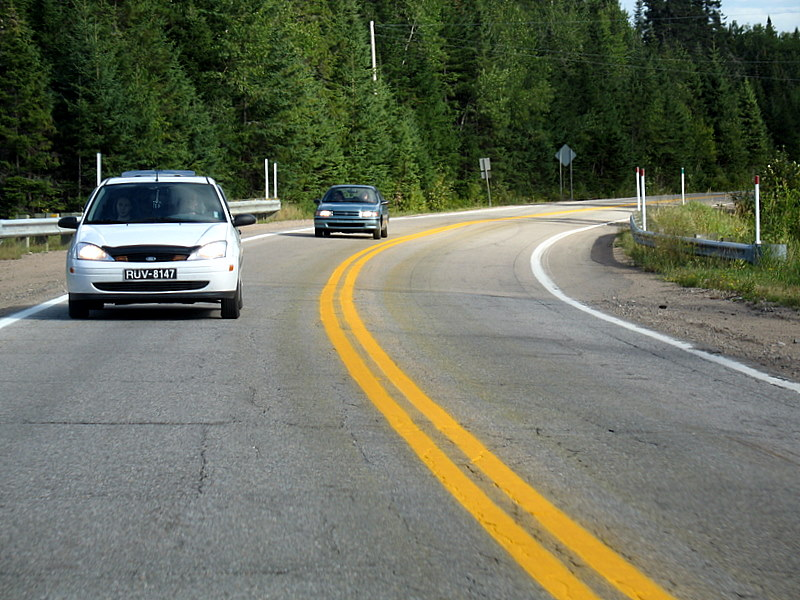
Route 367 in Rivière-à-Pierre

== See also ==
- List of Quebec provincial highways
