= Quebec Route 370 =

Highway in Quebec, Canada

Route 370

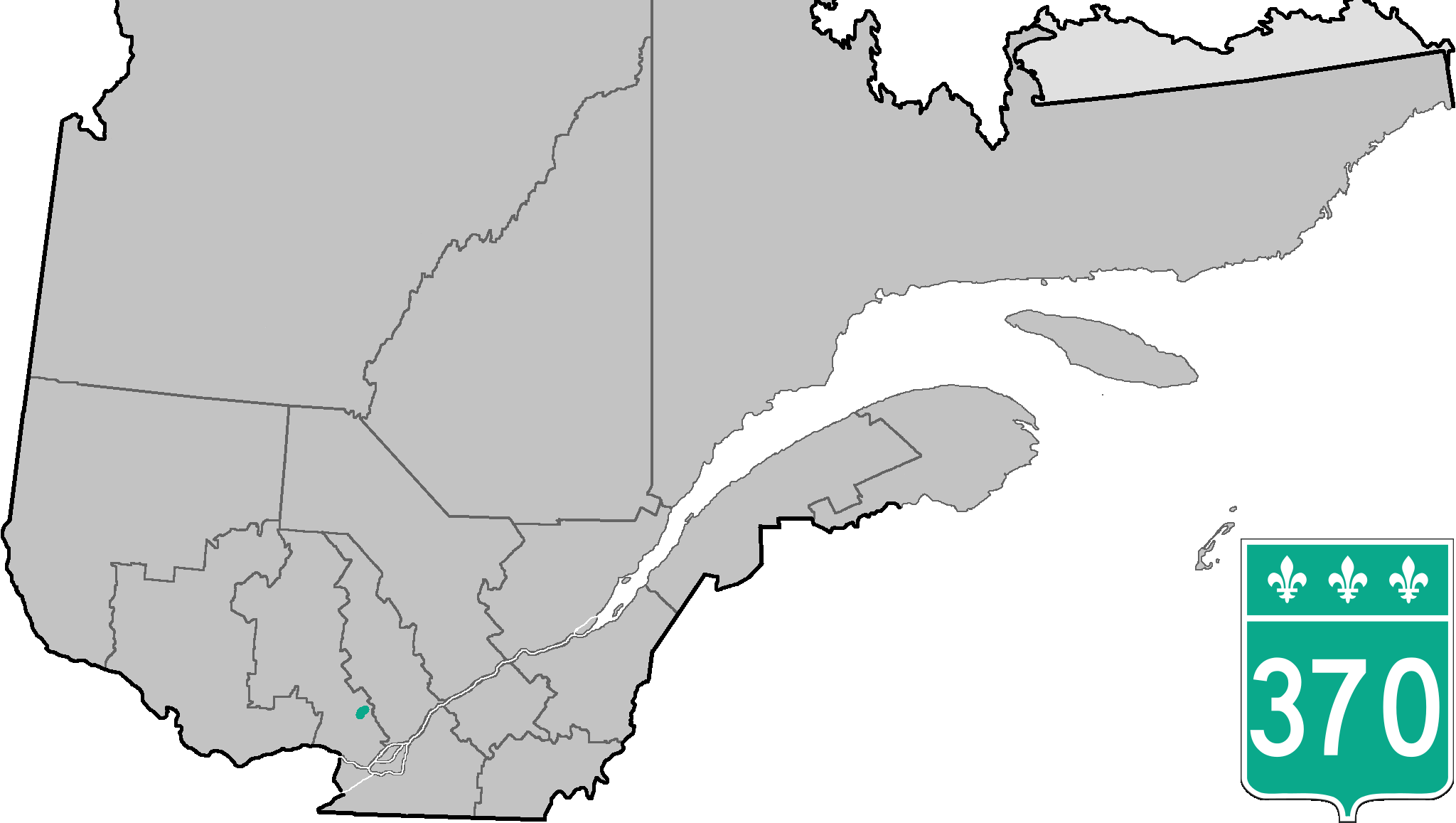

Route information
- Maintained by Transports Québec
- Length: 11 km (6.8 mi)

Major junctions
- West end: R-117 to A-15 (TCH) in Sainte-Adele
- A-15 (TCH) in Sainte-Adele
- East end: Chemin Masson in Sainte-Marguerite-du-Lac-Masson

Location
- Country: Canada
- Province: Quebec
- Major cities: Sainte-Adele

Highway system
- Quebec provincial highways; Autoroutes; List; Former
← R-369	→ R-371

Route 370 is a short provincial highway located in the Laurentides region of Quebec. The 11-kilometer highway which starts at the junctions of Autoroute 15 and Route 117 links the towns of Sainte-Adele and Esterel, two major touristic destinations in the region.

== Towns located along Route 370 ==
- Sainte-Adèle
- Sainte-Marguerite-du-Lac-Masson
- Estérel

== Major intersections ==
The entire route is in Les Pays-d'en-Haut RCM.

Location	km	mi	Destinations	Notes
Sainte-Adèle	0	0.0	R-117 to A-15 (TCH) south – Sommet-Bleu, Sainte-Adèle-Nord	Western terminus
Sainte-Adèle			A-15 (TCH) north – Sainte-Agathe-des-Monts	Exit 69 (A-15)
Sainte-Marguerite-du-Lac-Masson	11	6.8	Chemin Masson	Eastern terminus
1.000 mi = 1.609 km; 1.000 km = 0.621 mi

== See also ==
- List of Quebec provincial highways
