= Saint-Théophile =

- Municipality
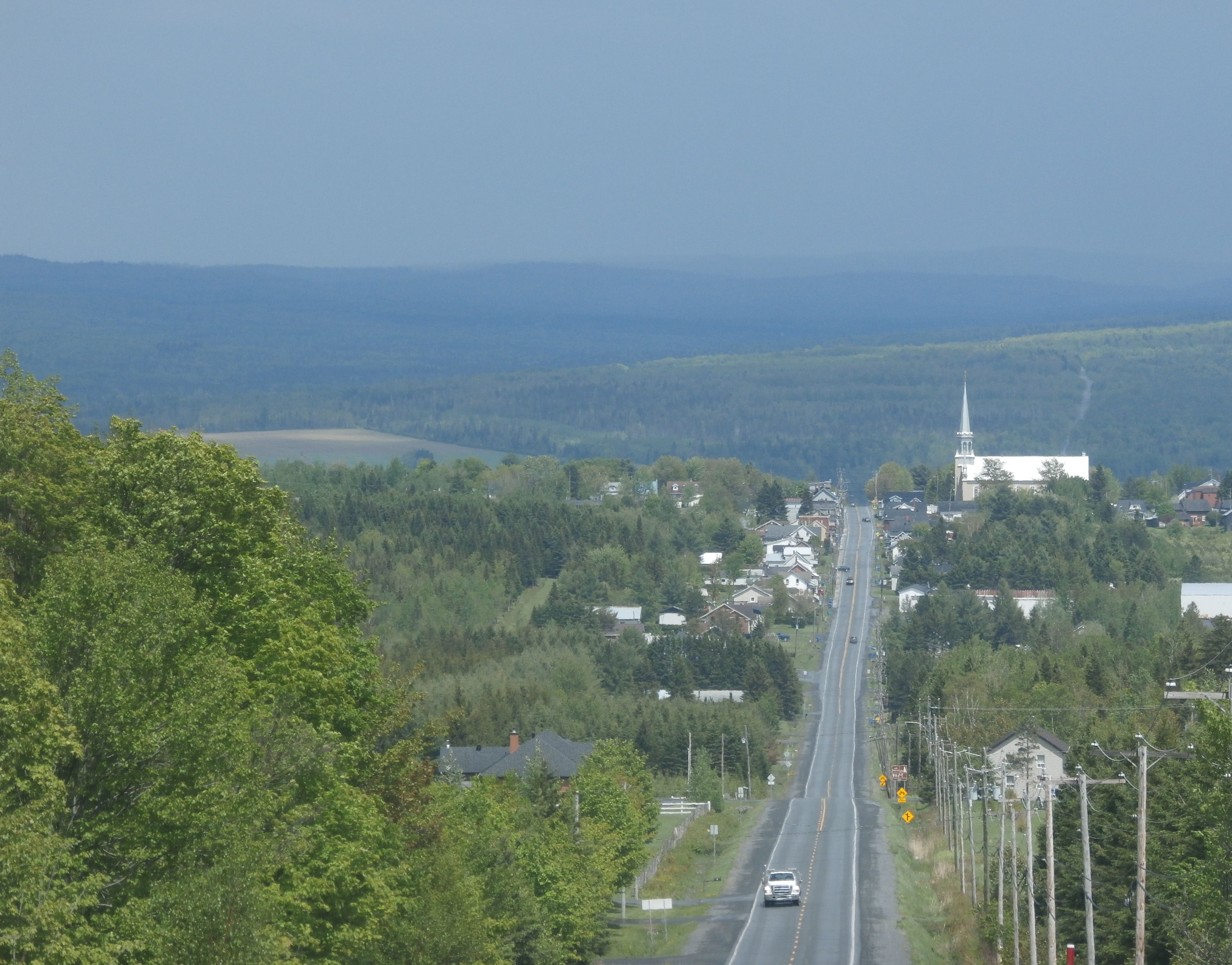

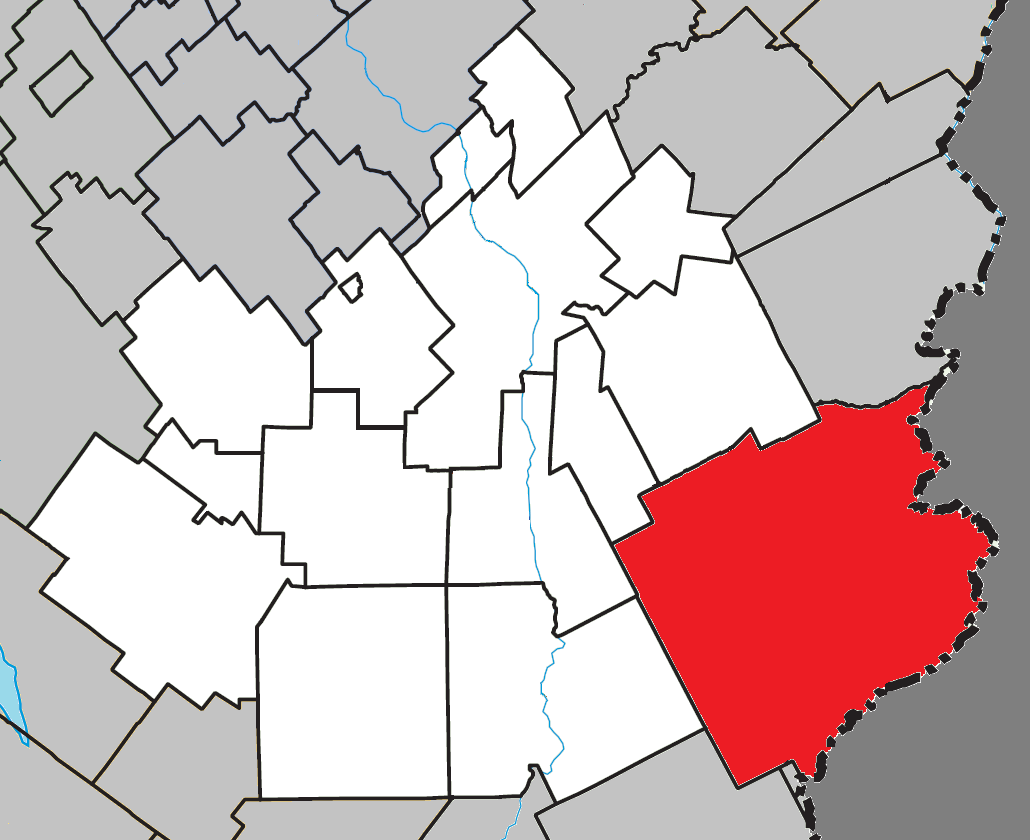
- Location within Beauce-Sartigan RCM.

- Location in southern Quebec.
- Coordinates: 45°56′N 70°29′W
- Country: Canada
- Province: Quebec
- Region: Chaudière-Appalaches
- RCM: Beauce-Sartigan
- Constituted: June 28, 1975

Government
  - Mayor: Michel Marquis
  - Federal riding: Beauce
  - Prov. riding: Beauce-Sud

Area
  - Total: 436.90 km^{2} (168.69 sq mi)
  - Land: 427.78 km^{2} (165.17 sq mi)

Population (2021)
  - Total: 721
  - Density: 1.6/km^{2} (4.1/sq mi)
  - Pop 2016-2021: ▲5.2%
  - Dwellings: 354
- Time zone: UTC−5 (EST)
  - Summer (DST): UTC−4 (EDT)
- Postal code(s): G0M 2A0
- Area codes: 418 and 581
- Highways: A-73; R-173; R-269
- Website: www.sainttheophile.qc.ca

Saint-Théophile (French pronunciation: [sɛ̃ teɔfil]) is a municipality in the Municipalité régionale de comté de Beauce-Sartigan in Quebec, Canada on the Canada–United States border. It is part of the Chaudière-Appalaches region and the population is 702 as of 2021. It is named after reverend Théophile Montminy, who had been chosen by the archdiocese to find a proper location for a church.

Saint-Théophile lies next to the border with Maine, and there is a border crossing on Route 173 within the municipality, in the hamlet of Armstrong. The Armstrong custom office is the third in importance in Quebec.
