= Quebec Route 371 =

Highway in Quebec, Canada

Route 371

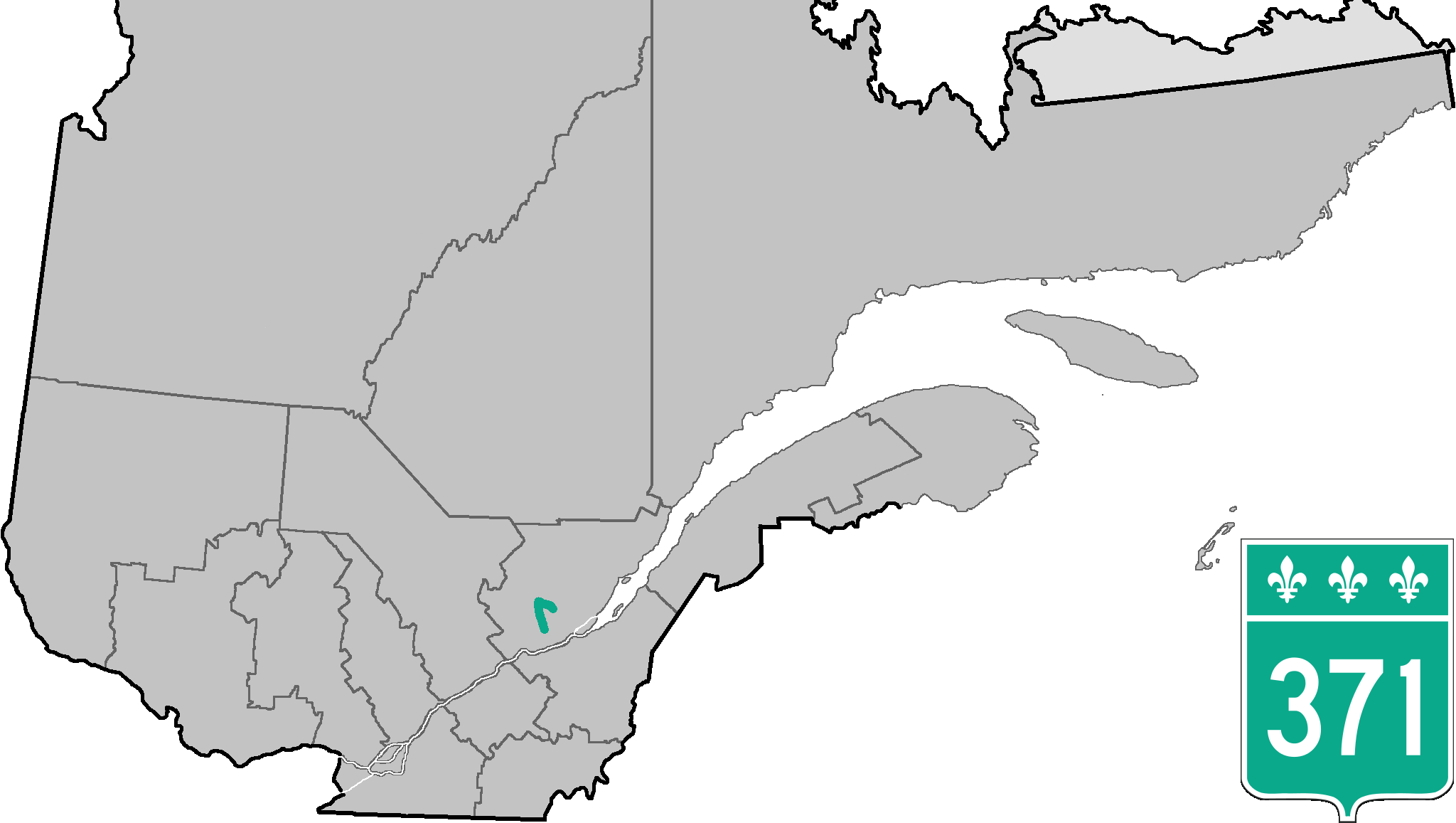

Route information
- Maintained by Transports Québec
- Length: 38.6 km (24.0 mi)

Major junctions
- North end: A-73 / R-175 in Stoneham
- South end: A-573 in Quebec City

Location
- Country: Canada
- Province: Quebec
- Major cities: Quebec City, Stoneham

Highway system
- Quebec provincial highways; Autoroutes; List; Former
← R-370	→ R-372

Route 371 is a provincial highway located in the Capitale-Nationale region in south-central Quebec. The highway starts in the Val-Bélair neighborhood in Quebec City at the junction of Autoroute 573 and ends in Stoneham-et-Tewkesbury at the junctions of Autoroute 73 and Route 175.

== Towns along Route 371 ==
- Quebec City (Val-Bélair)
- Valcartier
- Saint-Gabriel-de-Valcartier
- Stoneham-et-Tewkesbury

== See also ==
- List of Quebec provincial highways
