= Armstrong–Jackman Border Crossing =

Canada–United States border crossing

Jackman-Armstrong Border Crossing
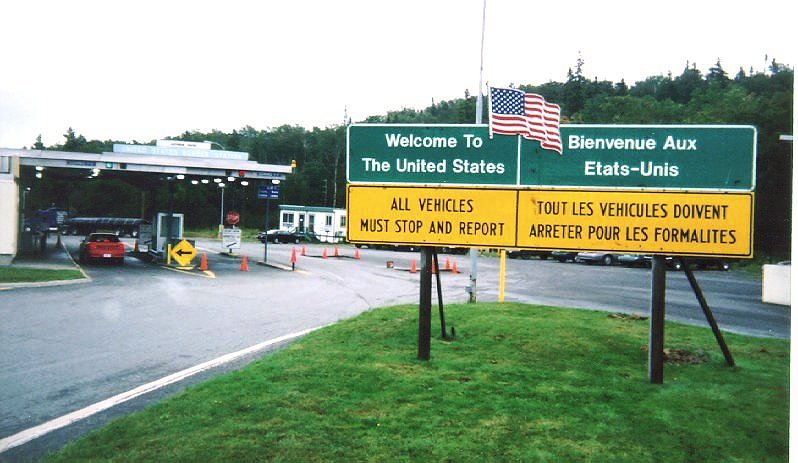
- Jackman, Maine, border station, as seen in April 2000

Locaiton
- Country: United States; Canada
- Location: US 201 / SR 6 / R-173; US Port: 2614 Main Street, Sandy Bay Township, ME 04945; Canadian Port: 999 Highway 173, Saint-Théophile, Québec G0M 2A0
- Coordinates: 45.805754°N 70.396743°W

Details
- Opened: 1917

Website
- https://www.cbp.gov/about/contact/ports/jackman-maine-0104

The Armstrong–Jackman Border Crossing is a border crossing on the Canada–United States border, located southeast of Saint-Théophile, Québec, and northwest of Jackman, Maine. The border crossing is the northern terminus of U.S. Route 201, which also has the road name Old Canada Road north of Jackman, and the southern terminus of Quebec Route 173, also known as Route-du-Président-Kennedy - the existing Quebec Autoroute 73 already heads in the direction of this US/Canadian border crossing, as the closest Canadian freeway of any kind in the area. The passport stamp includes the designation "JKM".

== History ==
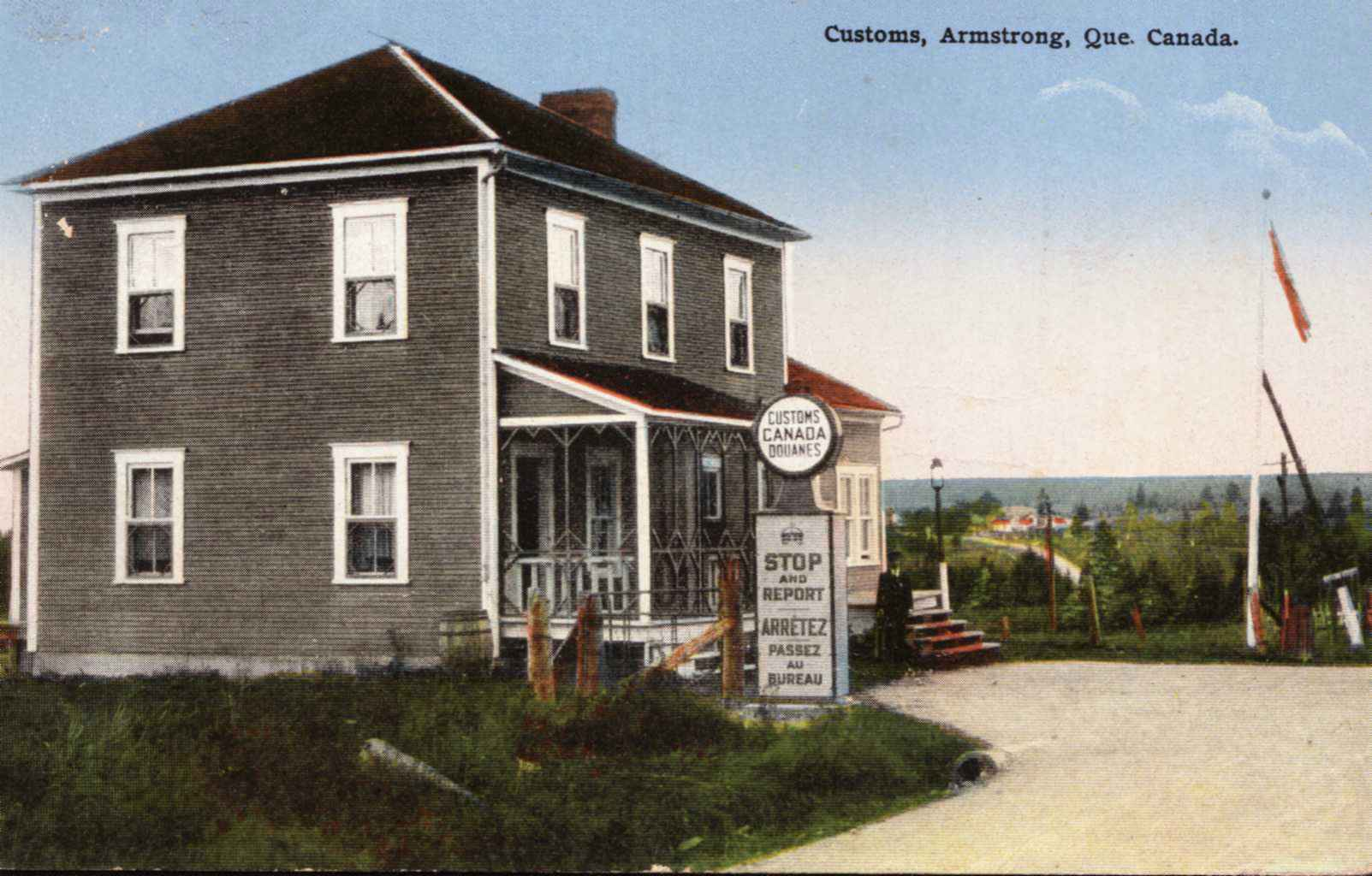
Canada Customs at Armstrong, Québec, as seen in 1923

Jackman, Maine, was named after Captain James Jackman who was hired by the State of Maine in the 1830s to build the road connecting the United States with Canada. The crossing is the busiest on the western side of Maine, one of four in the Maine Highlands, and the first paved one west of Fort Kent-Clair. During prohibition, a line house existed on the international boundary at this crossing. Customs operations of the US and Canada both operated out of many facilities over the years. Canada most recently rebuilt its border station in 2005. On the U.S. side, construction began in March 2008 on a new inspection station at the border. The $26-million project was completed in August 2010.

== See also ==
- List of Canada–United States border crossings
