= George Ranken (soldier) =

George Ranken (London, 4 January 1828 – Sebastopol, 28 February 1856) was a British soldier and author. A major in the Royal Engineers, he was known for his service in the Crimean War and his writing, mainly travel. Between 1850 and 1855, Ranken travelled through Canada, the United States and the West Indies. He took part in the efforts to extinguish the Great Fire of 1852 in Montreal. He was recognized for his help in saving the Literary and Historical Society of Quebec during the 1854 fire.

Ranken returned to England in 1855 and enlisted for active service. In august 1855 he arrived in Balaklava. He was accidentally killed in the demolition of a range of barracks in Sebastopol.

== Works ==
- He wrote under the pen-name "X, Author of Nothing, and Properly Represented by the Above Unknown Quantity." The Experiment: a farce, in one act, published in Quebec.
- Canada and the Crimea, or Sketches of a Soldier's Life,’ in 1862 (London, 8vo; 2nd ed. 1863).
- Six months at Sebastopol (London, 12mo) Ed. W. B. Ranken

== Legacy ==
- The stained glass windows of Christ Church in Saint Gabriel de Valcartier were donated to honour George Ranken who had helped finance its construction.
