= Saint-Gabriel-de-Valcartier =

- Municipality
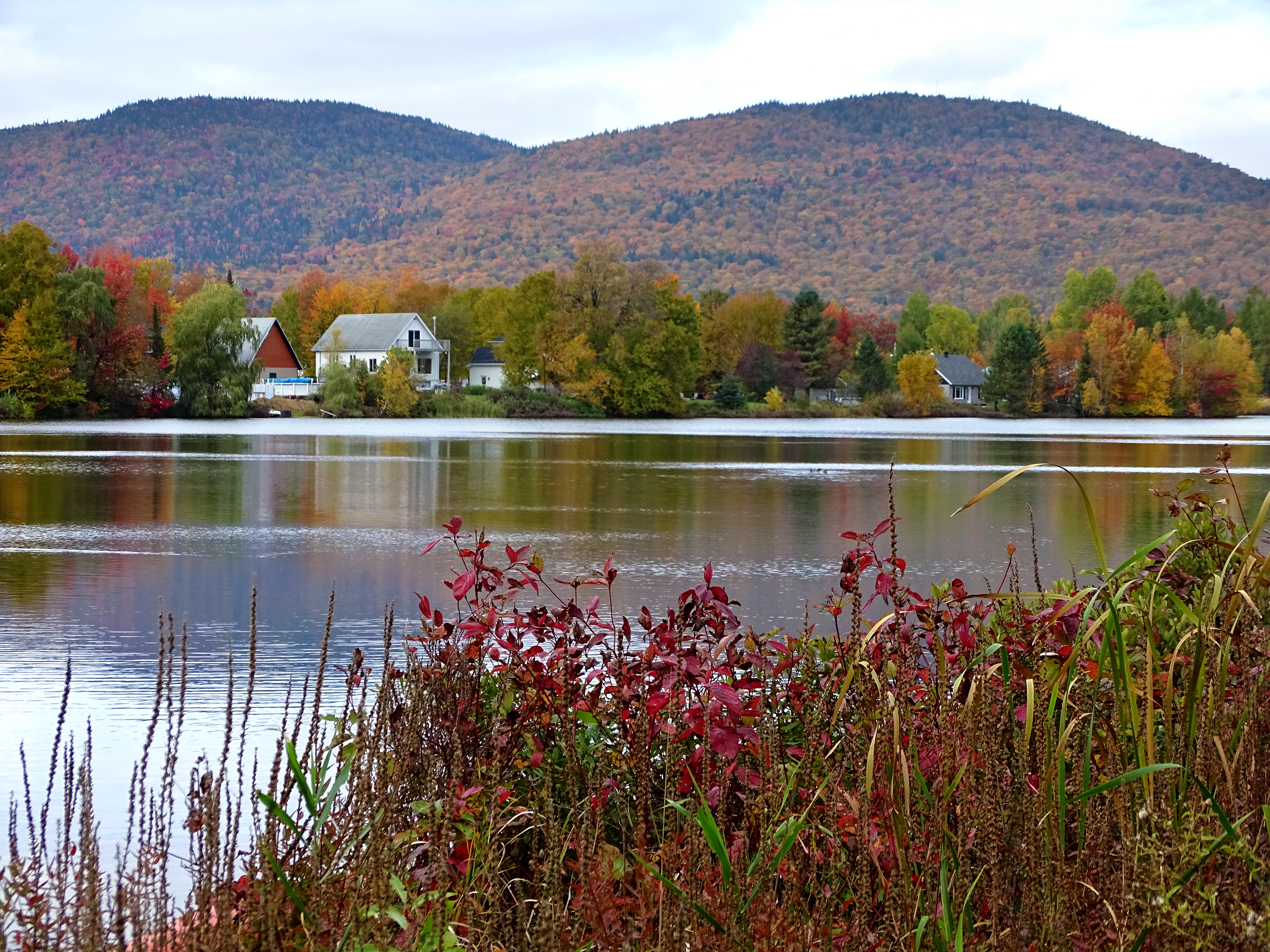

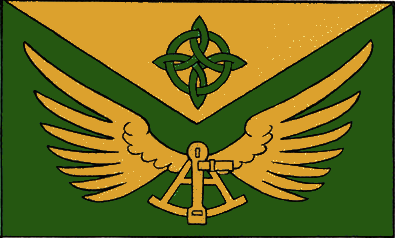
- Flag Coat of arms
- Motto(s): Together, in the heart of nature
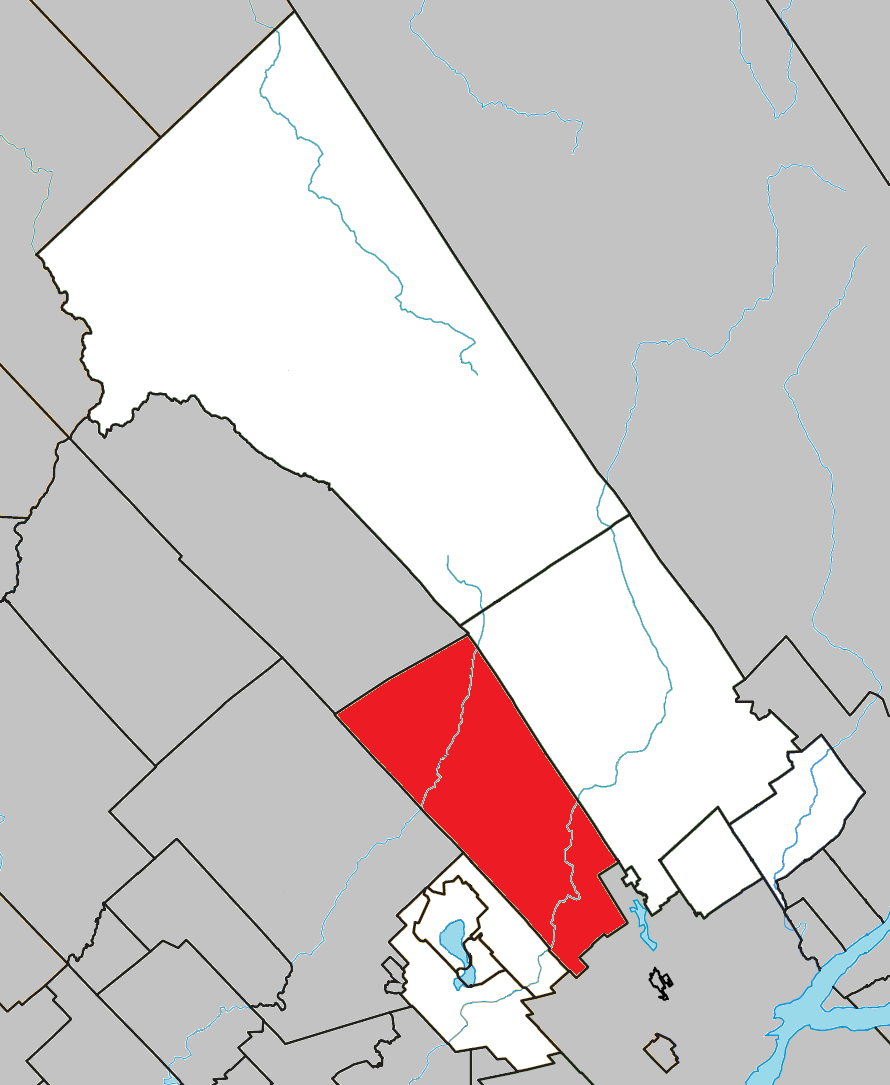
- Location within La Jacques-Cartier RCM

- Location in central Quebec
- Coordinates: 46°56′N 71°28′W
- Country: Canada
- Province: Quebec
- Region: Capitale-Nationale
- RCM: La Jacques-Cartier
- Settled: 1816
- Constituted: October 5, 1985

Government
  - Mayor: Brent Montgomery
  - Fed. riding: Saint-Augustin—Portneuf—Jacques-Cartier
  - Prov. riding: La Peltrie

Area
  - Total: 447.31 km^{2} (172.71 sq mi)
  - Land: 432.62 km^{2} (167.04 sq mi)

Population (2021)
  - Total: 3,223
  - Density: 7.5/km^{2} (19/sq mi)
  - Pop (2016-21): ▼4.7%
  - Dwellings: 1,136
- Time zone: UTC−5 (EST)
  - Summer (DST): UTC−4 (EDT)
- Postal code(s): G0A 4S0
- Area codes: 418, 581
- Highways A-573: R-369 R-371
- Website: www.saint-gabriel-de-valcartier.ca

Saint-Gabriel-de-Valcartier (French pronunciation: [sɛ̃ ɡabʁijɛl də valkaʁtje]) is a municipality in the Capitale-Nationale region of Quebec, Canada, located in the Jacques-Cartier River valley. It has been home to the Canadian Forces Base Valcartier since World War I.

== History ==
In 1647, Robert Giffard de Moncel was granted the Saint-Gabriel seignory that became property of the Jesuits in 1667 and Crown property in 1800. Around 1816, John Neilson (1776-1848), together with Andrew Stuart and Louis Moquin, Quebec lawyers, obtained some 50 concessions in the Saint-Gabriel seignory. This marked the start of the Val-Cartier settlement that was intended to receive Irish and Scottish colonizers.

In 1832, the Parish of Saint-Gabriel-de-Valcartier was formed when it was detached from Sainte-Catherine(-de-la-Jacques-Cartier) and Charlesbourg. In 1845, the Municipality of Valcartier was created in 1845 but abolished in 1847. The Parish Municipality of Saint-Gabriel-de-Valcartier was officially established in 1855, then divided in 1862 into two municipalities: Saint-Gabriel-Ouest and Saint-Gabriel-de-Valcartier. George Ranken, a british soldier and travel writer, contributed to finance the construction of Christ Church in 1854.

In 1985, Saint-Gabriel-Ouest and Saint-Gabriel-de-Valcartier were merged again to form the current municipality.

== Demography ==
Historical Census Data - Saint-Gabriel-de-Valcartier

Year	Pop.	±%
1871	737	—
1881	592	−19.7%
1891	504	−14.9%
1901	452	−10.3%
1911	470	+4.0%
1921	287	−38.9%
1931	246	−14.3%
1941	378	+53.7%

Year	Pop.	±%
1951	1,198	+216.9%
1956	2,333	+94.7%
1961	1,924	−17.5%
1966	1,241	−35.5%
1971	1,826	+47.1%
1976	2,019	+10.6%
1981	2,670	+32.2%
1986	2,717	+1.8%

Year	Pop.	±%
1991	2,754	+1.4%
1996	2,204	−20.0%
2001	2,256	+2.4%
2006	2,827	+25.3%
2011	2,933	+3.7%
2016	3,382	+15.3%
2021	3,223	−4.7%

Population counts are not adjusted for boundary changes and merger.
Source: Statistics Canada

Private dwellings occupied by usual residents (2021): 1,067 (total dwellings: 1,136)

Historical census populations – Saint-Gabriel-Ouest (1862–1985)

Year	Pop.	±%
1871	960	—
1881	777	−19.1%
1891	600	−22.8%
1901	478	−20.3%
1911	449	−6.1%

Year	Pop.	±%
1921	308	−31.4%
1931	247	−19.8%
1941	264	+6.9%
1951	258	−2.3%
1956	265	+2.7%

Year	Pop.	±%
1961	202	−23.8%
1966	184	−8.9%
1971	124	−32.6%
1976	150	+21.0%
1981	220	+46.7%

Source: Statistics Canada

== Notable people ==
- Jonathan Beaulieu-Cyr, film director
- Marc-André Bédard (born 1986), biathlete
- John Neilson (1776–1848), co-founder of Saint-Gabriel-de-Valcartier, member of the Parliament of Lower Canada, and publisher
- Andrew Stuart (1785–1840), co-founder of Saint-Gabriel-de-Valcartier, member of the Legislative Assembly of Lower Canada, and president of the Literary and Historical Society of Quebec

== See also ==
- List of municipalities in Quebec
