= Quebec Route 358 =

Highway in Quebec, Canada

Route 358

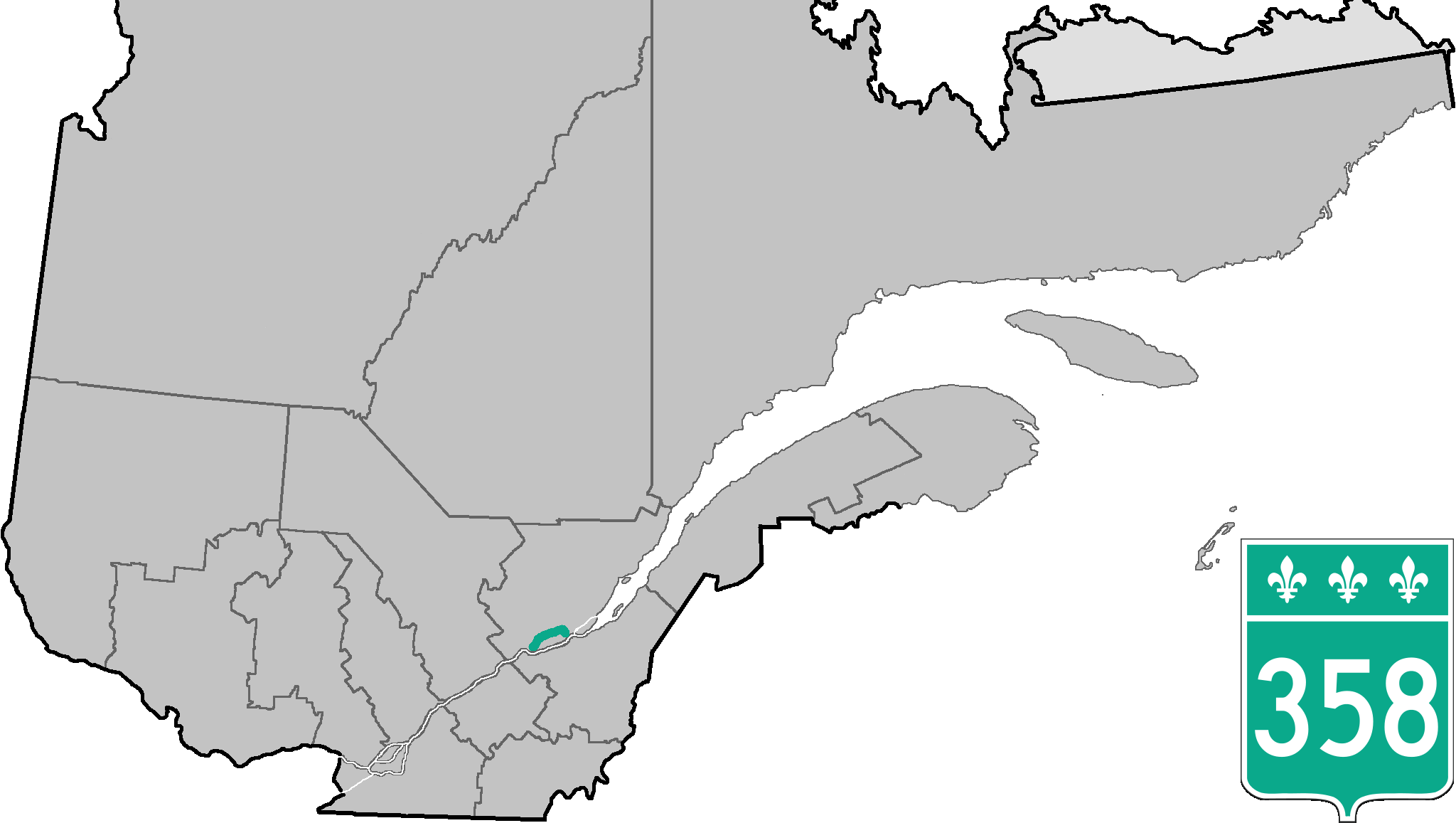

Route information
- Maintained by Transports Québec
- Length: 1 km (0.62 mi)

Major junctions
- West end: R-138 in Cap-Santé
- A-40 / R-138 in Cap-Santé; R-365 in Pont-Rouge; R-367 south of Sainte-Catherine-de-la-Jacques-Cartier; A-573 in Quebec City; R-369 in Quebec City; A-40 in Quebec City
- East end: R-138 in Quebec City

Location
- Country: Canada
- Province: Quebec
- Major cities: Quebec City

Highway system
- Quebec provincial highways; Autoroutes; List; Former
| ← R-354 | → R-359 |

Route 358 is a provincial highway located in the Capitale-Nationale region of Quebec. It runs from the junction of Route 138 (south of Autoroute 40) in Cap-Santé (west of Donnacona) and ends in the Vanier sector of Quebec City also at the junction of Highway 138 (known as Boulevard Wilfrid-Hamel). The roadway passes north of the Jean-Lesage International Airport situated just west of the junctions of Autoroute 40, 73 and 573. West of the Airport it overlaps Route 367 as well as Route 365 in Pont-Rouge.

== Towns located along Route 358 ==
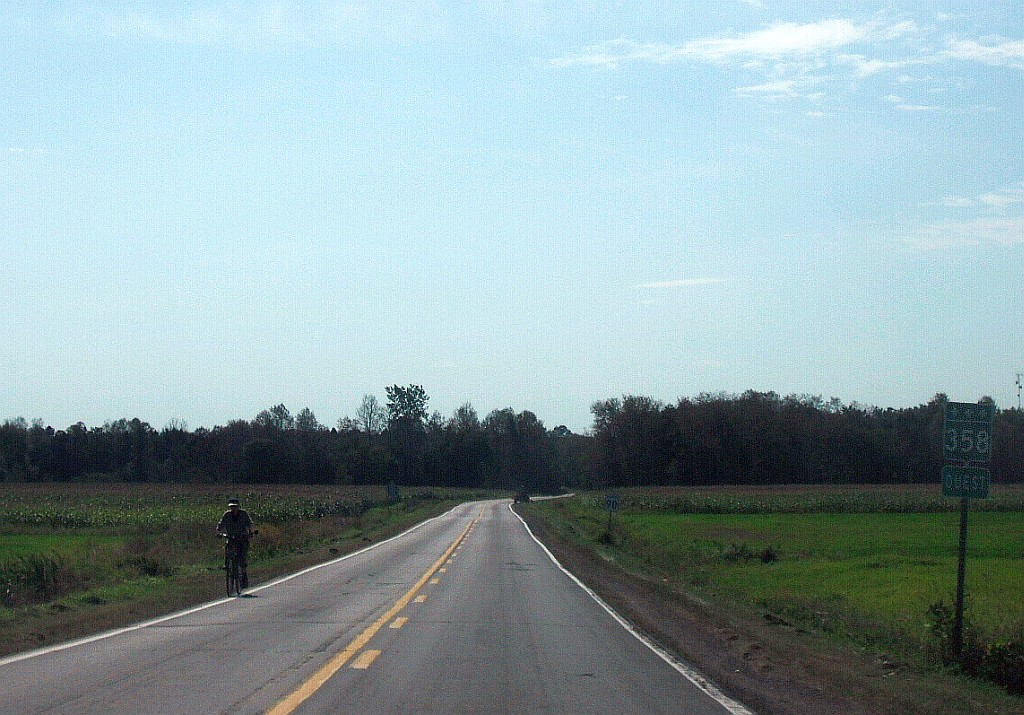
Quebec Route 358 in Pont-Rouge

- Cap-Santé
- Pont-Rouge
- Sainte-Catherine-de-la-Jacques-Cartier
- Saint-Augustin
- Quebec City (including L'Ancienne-Lorette and Vanier)

== See also ==
- List of Quebec provincial highways
