= Quebec Route 369 =

Highway in Quebec, Canada

Route 369

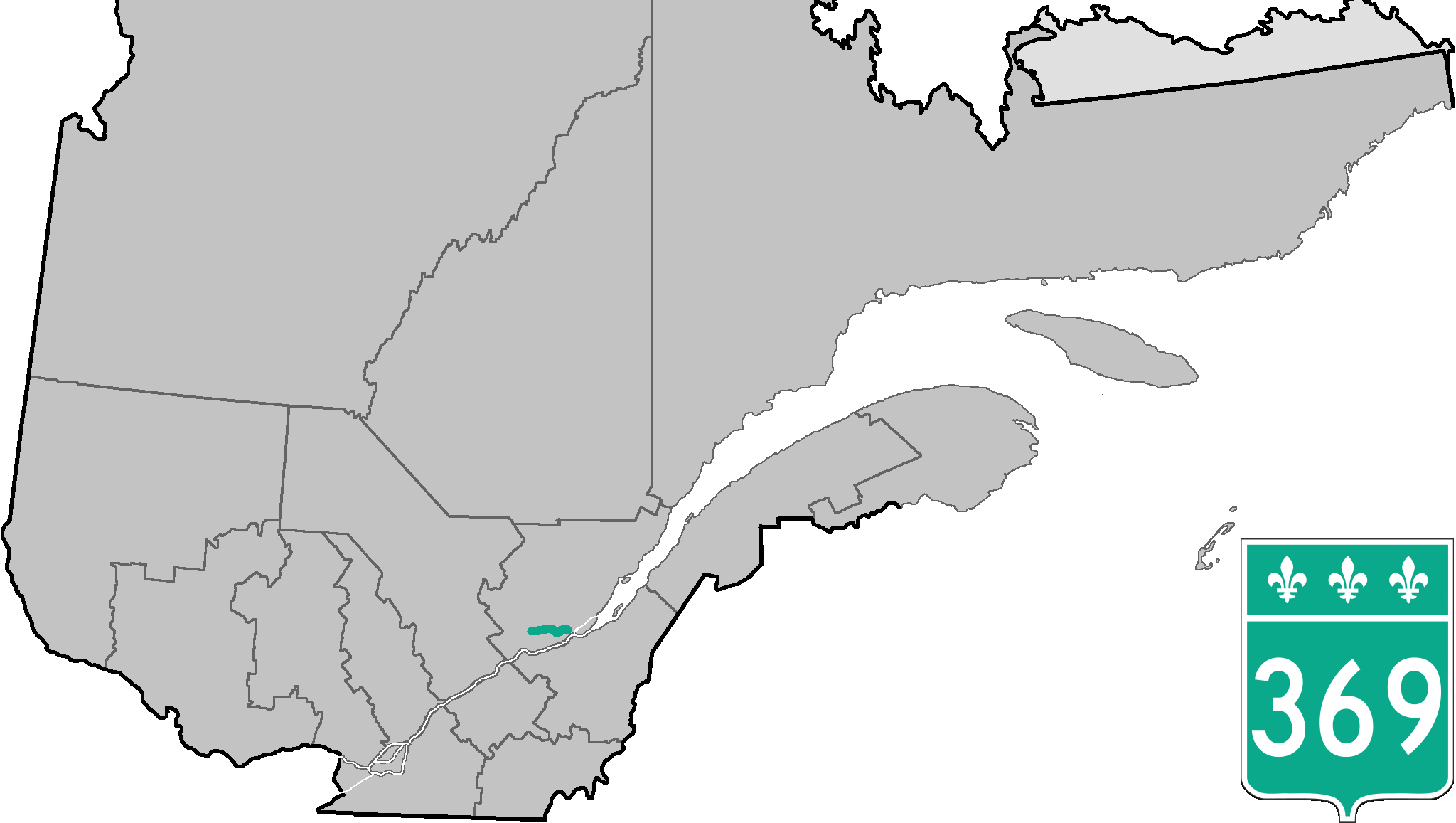

Route information
- Maintained by Transports Québec

Major junctions
- North end: R-367 in Sainte-Catherine-de-la-Jacques-Cartier
- A-73 / A-573 in Quebec City
- South end: R-360 in Quebec City (Beauport)

Location
- Country: Canada
- Province: Quebec
- Major cities: Quebec City

Highway system
- Quebec provincial highways; Autoroutes; List; Former
← R-368	→ R-370

Route 369 is a provincial highway located in the Capitale-Nationale region in south-central Quebec. The highway runs from Sainte-Catherine-de-la-Jacques-Cartier and ends in the Beauport sector of Quebec City at the junctions of Autoroute 40 and Route 360. The highway serves also CFB Valcartier military base located just off Autoroute 573.

== Towns located along Route 369 ==
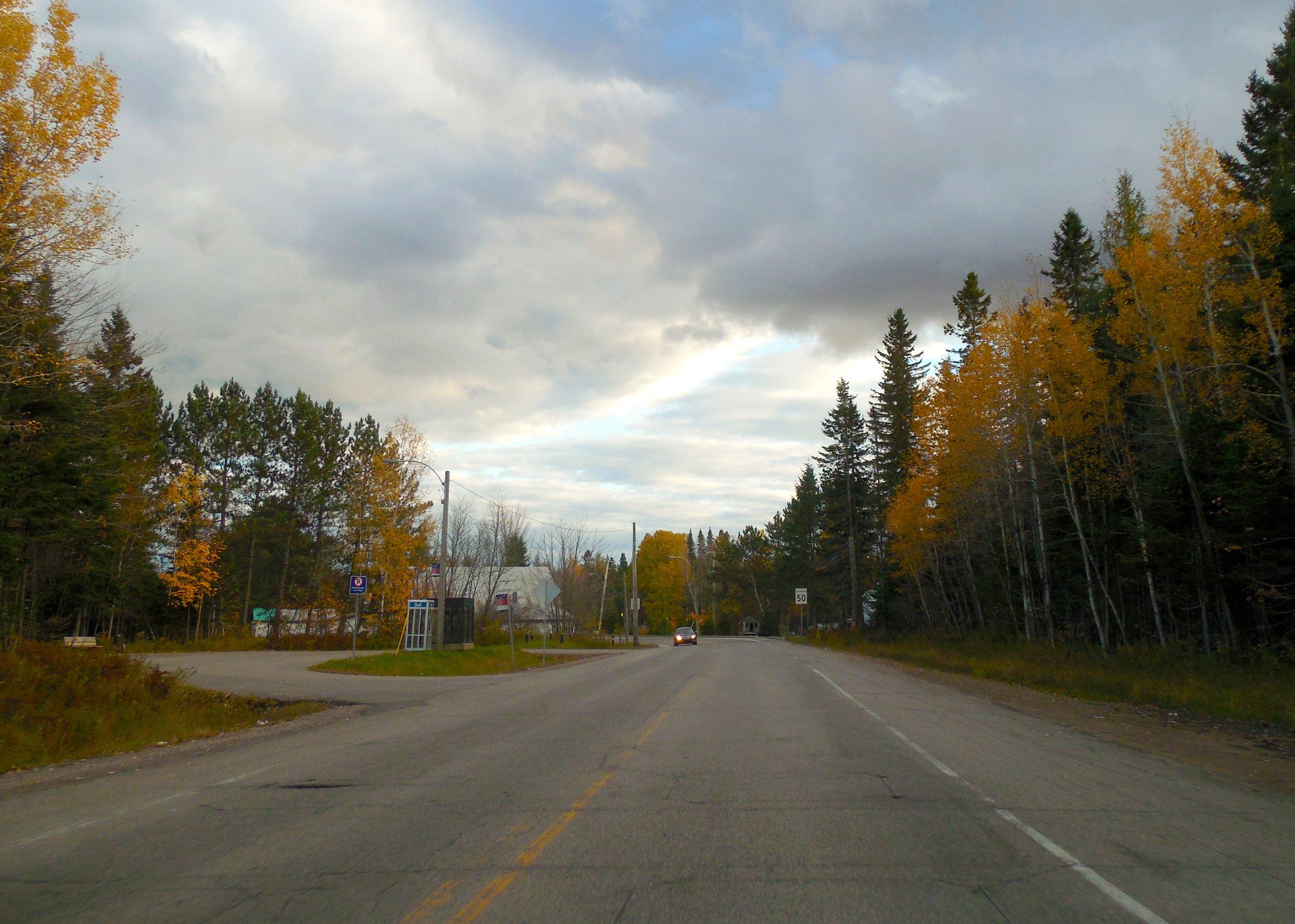
Quebec Route 369

- Quebec City including Beauport, Charlesbourg and Loretteville
- Val-Belair
- Courcelette
- Shannon
- Sainte-Catherine-de-la-Jacques-Cartier

== See also ==
- List of Quebec provincial highways
