= Pierre Laporte Bridge =

Bridge in Quebec City and Lévis, Quebec, Canada

Pierre Laporte Bridge Pont Pierre-Laporte (French)
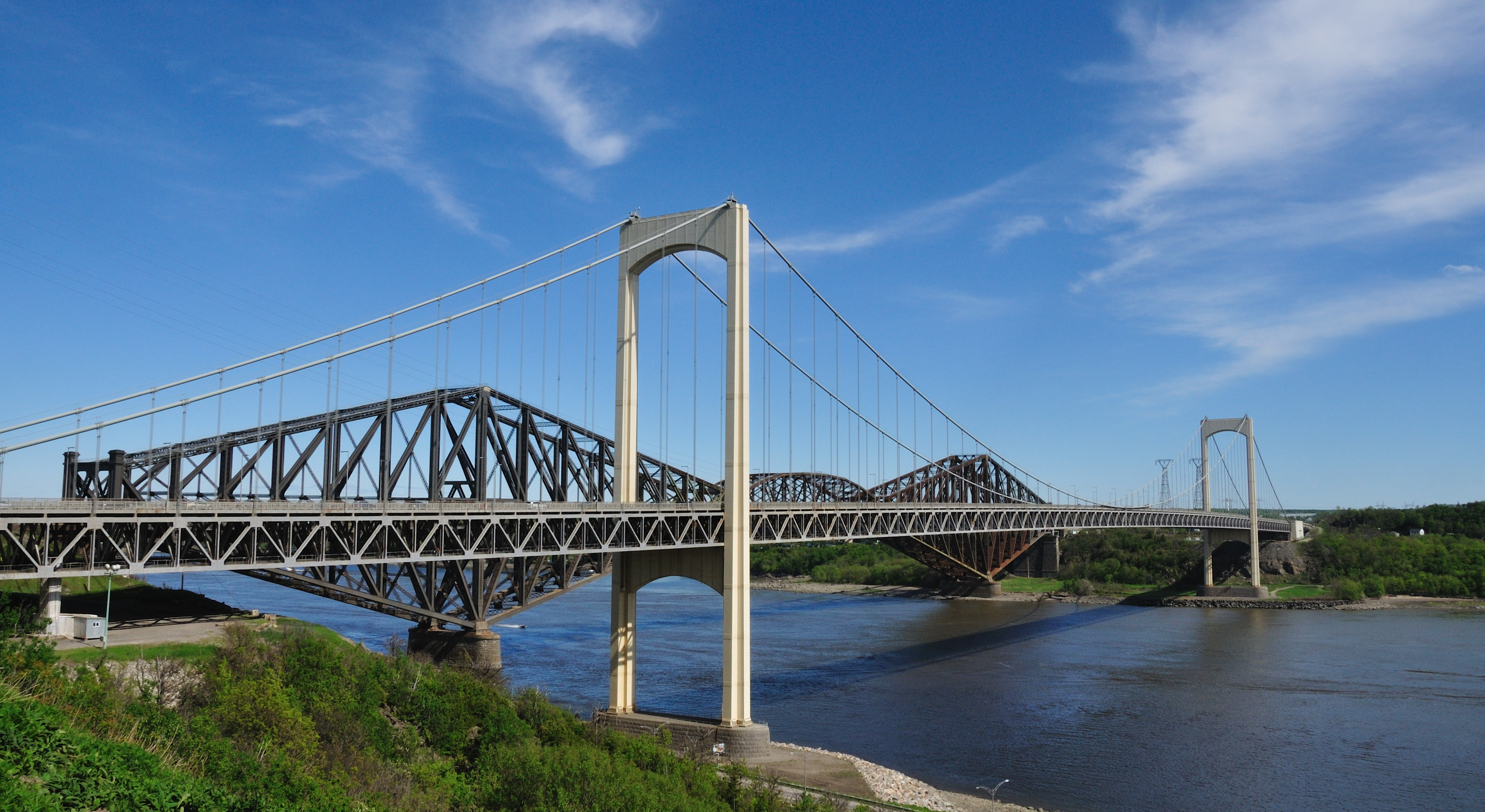
- Pierre Laporte Bridge (foreground).
- Coordinates: 46°44′42″N 71°17′27″W
- Carries: A-73
- Crosses: St. Lawrence River
- Locale: Quebec City and Lévis, Quebec
- Official name: Pont Pierre-Laporte

Characteristics
- Design: Suspension bridge
- Total length: 1,041 m (3,415 ft)
- Longest span: 667.5 m (2,190 ft)
- No. of lanes: 6

History
- Designer: Demers, Vaudry, Gronquist; Parsons Transportation Group
- Construction cost: Originally evaluated at $33 millions, it cost $55 million CAD (Approx. 455M$ in 2026 per Bank of Canada inflation)
- Opened: 1970

Statistics
- Daily traffic: 134,000
- Toll: Free

Location
- Interactive map of Pierre Laporte Bridge

The Pierre Laporte Bridge (French: Pont Pierre-Laporte (Note: pronounced [pɔ̃ pjɛʁ lapɔʁt])) is the longest main span suspension bridge in Canada. It crosses the Saint Lawrence River approximately 200 metres (660 ft) west (upstream) of the Quebec Bridge between Quebec City and Lévis. It spans 1,041 metres (3,415 ft).

It was originally named the New Quebec Bridge (Nouveau pont de Québec) and was supposed to be called Pont Frontenac (Frontenac Bridge) until it was renamed in honour of Quebec Vice-Premier Pierre Laporte, who was kidnapped and murdered during the October Crisis of 1970 as construction of the bridge was nearing completion. The bridge was constructed for the Province of Quebec, Department of Roads in a joint venture with the private firm of Parsons Transportation Group.

It carries Autoroute 73 northbound from Autoroute 20, the Trans-Canada Highway, to Quebec City and Autoroute 40 and also northwards towards Saguenay.

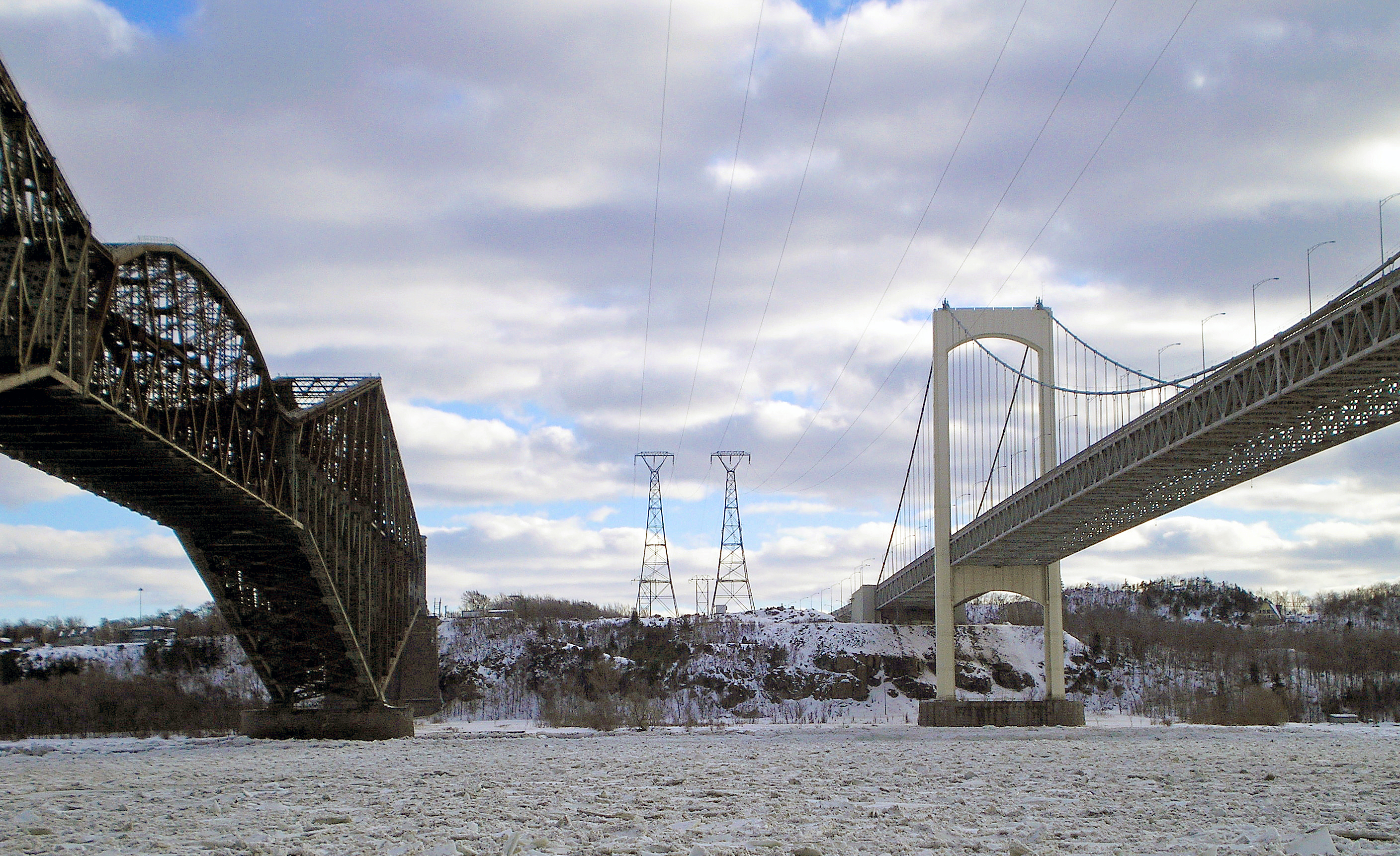
Quebec and Pierre-Laporte Bridges in winter.

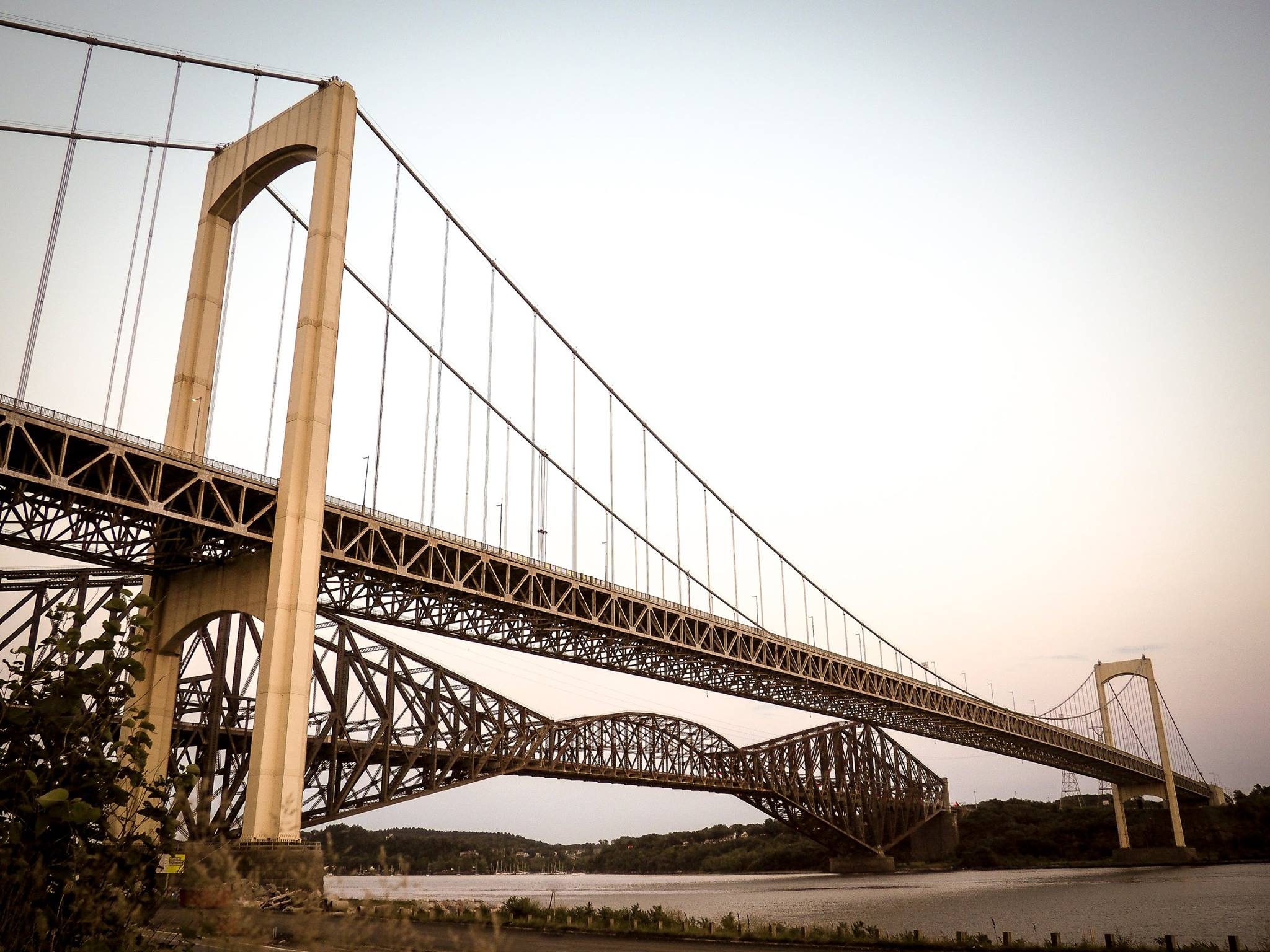
Pierre-Laporte Bridge (May 2015).

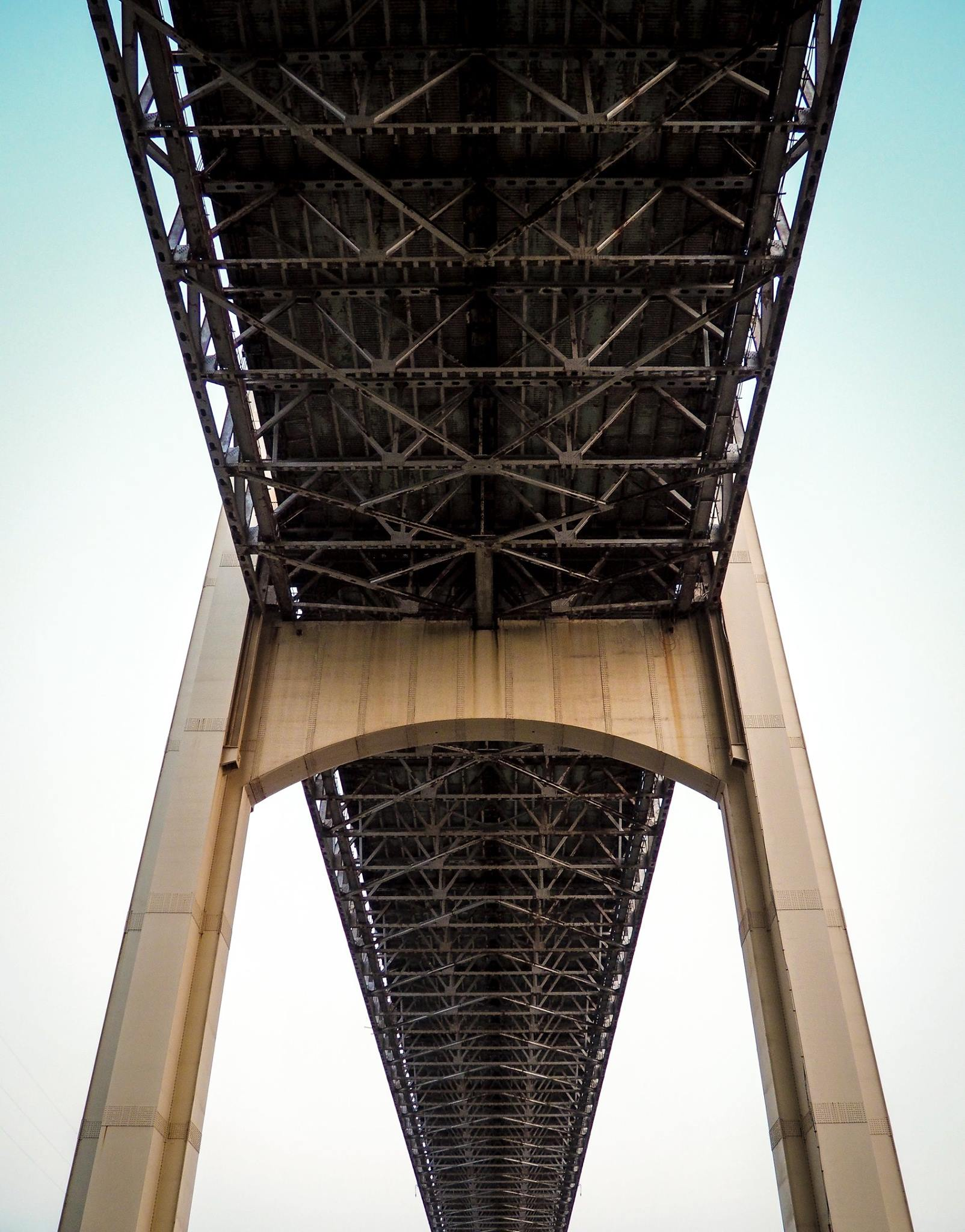
View from under the north side of the bridge.

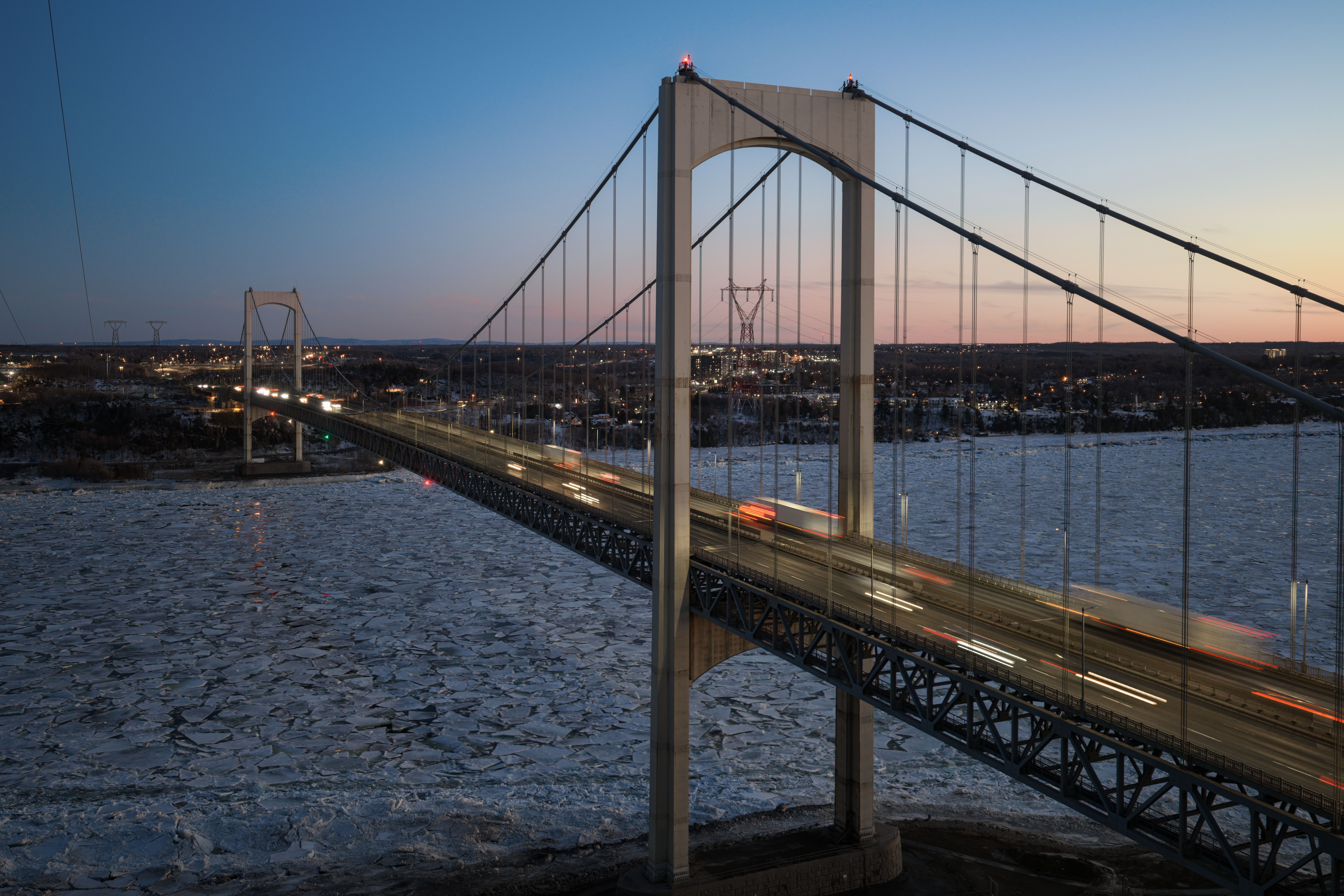
View from the north side during winter

== Specifications ==
- Constructed: 1966-1970
- Main span: 667.5 metres (2,190 ft)
- Side spans: 186.5 metres (612 ft) each
- Total length: 1,041 metres (3,415 ft) between anchorages
- Deck: Six-lane freeway bridge
- Capacity: 90,000 vehicles per day

== See also ==
- List of crossings of the Saint Lawrence River
- List of bridges in Canada
