= List of Quebec provincial highways =

Quebec provincial highways
- Standard highway markers for Quebec

System information
- Maintained by Transports Québec

Highway names
- Provincial Highways: Quebec Route XX (Route XX)

System links
- Quebec provincial highways; Autoroutes; List; Former

This is a list of highways maintained by the government of Quebec.

== Autoroutes ==
The Autoroute system in Quebec is a network of expressways which operate under the same principle of controlled access as the Interstate Highway System in the United States or the 400-Series Highways in neighbouring Ontario.

== Routes nationales ==
- R-101
- R-104
- R-105
- R-107
- R-108
- R-109
- R-111
- R-112
- R-113
- R-116
- R-117 (TCH)
- R-122
- R-125
- R-131
- R-132
- R-133
- R-134
- R-136 (Montreal)
- R-136 (Quebec City)
- R-137
- R-138
- R-139
- R-141
- R-143
- R-147
- R-148
- R-153
- R-155
- R-157
- R-158
- R-159
- R-161
- R-162
- R-165
- R-167
- R-169
- R-170
- R-171
- R-172
- R-173
- R-175
- R-191
- R-195
- R-197
- R-198
- R-199

== Regional routes ==
=== South of the St. Lawrence River ===
- R-201
- R-202
- R-203
- R-204
- R-205
- R-206
- R-207
- R-208
- R-209
- R-210
- R-211
- R-212
- R-213
- R-214
- R-215
- R-216
- R-217
- R-218
- R-219
- R-220
- R-221
- R-222
- R-223
- R-224
- R-225
- R-226
- R-227
- R-228
- R-229
- R-230
- R-231
- R-232
- R-233
- R-234
- R-235
- R-236
- R-237
- R-239
- R-241
- R-243
- R-245
- R-247
- R-249
- R-251
- R-253
- R-255
- R-257
- R-259
- R-261
- R-263
- R-265
- R-267
- R-269
- R-271
- R-273
- R-275
- R-276
- R-277
- R-279
- R-281
- R-283
- R-285
- R-287
- R-289
- R-291
- R-293
- R-295
- R-296
- R-297
- R-298
- R-299

=== North of the St. Lawrence River ===
- R-301
- R-303
- R-307
- R-309
- R-311
- R-315
- R-317
- R-321
- R-323
- R-325
- R-327
- R-329
- R-333
- R-335
- R-337
- R-338
- R-339
- R-340
- R-341
- R-342
- R-343
- R-344
- R-345
- R-346
- R-347
- R-348
- R-349
- R-350
- R-351
- R-352
- R-354
- R-358
- R-359
- R-360
- R-361
- R-362
- R-363
- R-364
- R-365
- R-366
- R-367
- R-368
- R-369
- R-370
- R-371
- R-372
- R-373
- R-381
- R-382
- R-385
- R-386
- R-388
- R-389
- R-390
- R-391
- R-393
- R-395
- R-397
- R-399

== Trans-Canada ==
Quebec Trans-Canada Highway shield

The Trans-Canada Highway through Quebec does not have a distinct number, but rather piggybacks over the provincial highway system, mainly autoroutes, and is signed with a numberless TCH shield next to the numbered provincial highway shield. As no single provincial highway crosses the entire province between Ontario and New Brunswick, the main Trans-Canada route follows (from west to east) Autoroutes 40, 25, 20 and 85.

== Other significantly-long roads ==
- Route de la Baie James (James Bay Road)
- Route du Nord (North Road)
- Route Transtaïga (Trans-Taiga Road)
