= Quebec (census division) =

Coordinates: 46.8161°N 71.2242°W

Québec is a territory equivalent to a regional county municipality (TE) and census division (CD) of Quebec. Its geographical code is 23.

The TE of Québec consists of:

- the three municipalities of the urban agglomeration of Quebec City, namely

- the city of Quebec,
- the city of L'Ancienne-Lorette, and
- the city of Saint-Augustin-de-Desmaures;

- the parish municipality of Notre-Dame-des-Anges; and
- the Indian reserve of Wendake.

== See also ==
- List of regional county municipalities and equivalent territories in Quebec
