= List of former and unbuilt autoroutes of Quebec =

The following is a list and description of former and unbuilt Quebec autoroutes.

== Former autoroutes ==
=== Autoroute 51 ===
Autoroute 51
- Joseph-Armand-Bombardier Autoroute
- Existed: 1974 – 1982 (renumbered as A-55)
- Length: 9 km (6 mi)
- South end: R-116 near Melbourne
- North end: A-20 (TCH) in Drummondville

Autoroute 55 south of Autoroute 20 to Route 116 was co-designated Autoroute 51 until 1982. By 1983, official documents had removed the Autoroute 51 designation from its section of Autoroute 55. In the 1970s, there were plans to extend Autoroute 51 north of Autoroute 20 to a proposed easterly extension of Autoroute 30 near Yamaska.

=== Autoroute 430 ===
Autoroute 430
- René-Levesque Autoroute
- Existed: Renumbered as A-15, A-20 and Route 132
- Length: 25 km (15.53 mi)
- South end: A-15 / R-132 in Candiac
- Major junctions: A-10 / A-15 / A-20 in Brossard; A-20 (TCH) / A-25 (TCH) in Boucherville
- North end: A-25 (TCH) / A-20 (TCH) in Boucherville

Autoroute 430 was proposed to connect Candiac to Sainte-Julie. The section between Candiac and Boucherville was constructed but remained unsigned, instead being signed as part of Route 132 with a 13 km (8 mi) concurrency with Autoroute 15 and a 15 km (9 mi) concurrency with Autoroute 20.

Initially, Highway 20 was to pass through Downtown Montreal along present-day Route 136 (Autoroute Ville-Marie) corridor, join Autoroute 25, and cross the St. Lawrence River via the Louis-Hippolyte Lafontaine Bridge–Tunnel. Autoroute 20 was to pass temporarily on the south shore (the overlap with Route 132), and once the initial route was constructed, the south shore section would be renumbered to Autoroute 430. The Autoroute Ville-Marie extension was cancelled and Autoroute 20 is permanently routed on the south shore, resulting in the Autoroute 430 designation being cancelled. The exit numbers on Autoroute 20 were adjusted in 2012.

The northern part of Autoroute 430 between the freeway section of Route 132 in Boucherville and Autoroute 30 in Sainte-Julie was not constructed.

=== Autoroute 540 (Vaudreuil-Dorion) ===
Autoroute 540
- Existed: 1967 – 2012 (renumbered as A-30)
- Length: 4.9 km (3 mi)
- South end: A-20 in Vaudreuil-Dorion
- North end: A-40 (TCH) in Vaudreuil-Dorion

The Vaudreuil-Dorion segment of Autoroute 540 was a short connection between Autoroute 20 and Autoroute 40. It became part of Autoroute 30 in when its extension was completed in December 2012.

=== Autoroute 755 ===
Autoroute 755
- Autoroute de Francheville
- Existed: 1977 – 1980s
- Length: 10 km (6 mi)
- West end: A-55 in Trois-Rivières
- East end: A-40 in Trois-Rivières

Autoroute 755 is in service but is currently part of Autoroute 40. Originally, Autoroute 40 was to avoid the downtown area of Trois-Rivières and to pass north of its current alignment, continuing east from the northern Autoroute 40 / Autoroute 55 interchange to a tight curve near Rue Courteau. The present alignment of Autoroute 40 in the downtown area would have been designated as Autoroute 755.

It existed briefly in the mid-1980s under the name of Autoroute de Francheville, but was incorporated into Autoroute 40 when the construction of the original route was suspended.

== Unbuilt autoroutes ==
=== Autoroute 6 ===
Autoroute 6
- Richelieu Autoroute; Autoroute Haut-Richelieu
- Existed: 2003
- Length: 55 km (34 mi)
- West end: A-15 in La Prairie
- Major junctions: A-30 in La Prairie; A-35 in Saint-Jean-sur-Richelieu
- East end: R-235 in Farnham

Proposed in the 1960s, Autoroute 6 was planned to run from Autoroute 15 in La Prairie to Farnham, also intersecting Autoroute 30 and Autoroute 35; it would have paralleled Route 104. The western half of the route was cancelled by the mid-1970s while the rest of the route was abandoned a few years later. Reconstruction of Autoroute 15 through La Prairie in the mid-2000s removed a grassy median at km 49 where ramps were to be built for a directional T-interchange to connect with Autoroute 6.

=== Autoroute 9 ===
Autoroute 9
- Pointe Fortune-Lachute Autoroute
- Existed: Project cancelled
- Length: 12 km (7 mi)
- South end: A-40 (TCH) in Pointe-Fortune
- North end: A-50 in Lachute

Proposed in the 1960s and early 1970s, Autoroute 9 was planned to run from Autoroute 40 in Pointe-Fortune to Autoroute 50 in Lachute, providing a fixed crossing over the Ottawa River. Evidence of the proposed Autoroute 9 can be found in the form of a wide median on Autoroute 40 (to accommodate a Y-interchange) just east of Exit 1 in Pointe-Fortune.

=== Autoroute 10 ===
Autoroute 10
- Autoroute des Cantons de l'Est
- Existed: Project cancelled
- Length: 100 km (62 mi)
- West end: A-55 in Sherbrooke
- East end: A-73 in Saint-Georges

The Autoroute 10 was planned in 1971 to Saint-Georges with a crossing of Autoroute 65 in Lambton.

=== Autoroute 13 ===
Autoroute 13
- Autoroute Chomedey
- Existed: Project cancelled
- Length: 25 km (16 mi)
- South end: A-13 / A-640 in Boisbriand
- North end: A-50 in Mirabel

Portion only: There was a proposal to extend Autoroute 13 from Autoroute 640 in Boisbriand to Autoroute 50 near Mirabel Airport. Since Mirabel Airport ceased passenger operations in 2004, the A-13 extension was de-prioritised.

=== Autoroute 15 ===
Autoroute 15
- Location: Montréal
- Existed: Cancelled

Portion only: There was a fully funded proposal to bypass the Autoroute 15 concurrency along Autoroute 40 (known as Autoroute Métropolitaine or "the Met" between the two segments of Autoroute 15) by diverging from its present alignment south of the Henri-Bourassa/Sauve exit to connect directly from the North into the Decarie interchange.

=== Autoroute 16 ===
Autoroute 16
- Autoroute Wilfrid-Laurier
- Existed: Project cancelled
- Length: 9 km (6 mi)
- West end: Jacques Cartier Bridge
- East end: A-30 in Longueuil

Reserved for autoroute conversion of Boulevard Wilfrid-Laurier (Route 112 and Route 116).

=== Autoroute 18 ===
Autoroute 18
- Autoroute des Bois-Francs
- Existed: Project cancelled
- Length: n/a
- West end: A-55 in Victoriaville
- East end: A-65 (proposed) in Plessisville

In the 1970s, Autoroute 18 was proposed to extend east from Autoroute 55 through Victoriaville toward Autoroute 65 (also unbuilt) in Plessisville.

=== Autoroute 20 ===
Autoroute 20
- Autoroute du Souvenir

Vaudreuil-Dorion section
- Length: 8 km (5 mi)
- West end: A-20 / A-30 in Vaudreuil-Dorion
- East end: A-20 / Boulevard Don-Quichotte in L'Île-Perrot

Downtown Montréal section
- Length: 15 km (9 mi)
- West end: A-15 / A-20 in Montréal
- East end: A-25 (TCH) in Montréal

Portions only: Autoroute 20 has two unbuilt sections, one bypassing Dorion and another the continuation of the present Route 136, joining Autoroute 25 north of the tunnel.

The proposed alignment of the Dorion bypass would have begun at present-Autoroute 30 (formerly Autoroute 540), crossed the Ottawa River at the Hydro transmission wire crossing, and joined the current route at Boulevard Don-Quichotte. Current plans are to move the proposed highway slightly north between the eastern bridge entrance to the town of Dorion and the last junction at Boulevard Harwood (Route 342).

The section east of the current Ville-Marie tunnel was supposed to be designated Autoroute 20 but was designated as Autoroute 720 until 2021 where it was redesignated to Route 136. The highway is currently routed from the Turcot interchange along Autoroute 15, over the Champlain Bridge, and then east on Route 132 towards Autoroute 25 at the southern end of the tunnel.

=== Autoroute 35 ===
Autoroute 35
- Autoroute de la Vallée-des-Forts
- Existed: Project cancelled
- Length: 4.5 km (3 mi)
- South end: I-89 at the Canada-U.S. border
- North end: A-35 / R-133 in Philipsburg

When Autoroute 35 was first built in the 1960s, it ended at the junction of Route 133 and rue Lefort in Iberville. Around 2009, it was announced that the Autoroute would be completed in four phases by 2017. The first two phases opened in October 2014, extending the highway from Iberville to Route 133 at Saint-Sébastien. Phase 3 opened in October 2025, further extending the highway to Philipsburg. Phase 4, comprising the remaining 4.5 km (2.8 mi) to the United States border, was cancelled by the provincial government in 2025. Traffic bound for Interstate 89 continues to the border on Route 133, a four-lane divided highway with at-grade junctions.

=== Autoroute 40 ===
Autoroute 40
- Autoroute Félix-Leclerc

Trois-Rivières section
- Length: 11 km (7 mi)
- West end: A-40 / A-55 in Trois-Rivières
- East end: A-40 in Trois-Rivières

Quebec City section
- Length: 12 km (7 mi)
- West end: A-40 in Quebec City
- East end: A-40 / A-73 / A-573 in Quebec City

Two sections of Autoroute 40 were not part of the original plans. The original intention was to bypass Trois-Rivières to the north, while the existing Autoroute 40 through downtown would have been Autoroute 755, avoiding its present concurrency with Autoroute 55. In addition, a different route was originally planned around Sainte-Foy (now in the west end of Quebec City) south of Jean Lesage International Airport, while the existing 12 km (7.5 mi) segment of Autoroute 40 between Sainte-Augustin and Autoroute 73 would have been the western end of Autoroute 440. Both rights-of-way are still maintained.

=== Autoroute 50 ===
Autoroute 50
- Joliette Beltway
- Existed: Project cancelled
- Length: n/a
- West end: A-25 in Saint-Esprit
- East end: A-31 / R-131 in Joliette

Portions only: Originally, the portion of Route 158 between Saint-Esprit and Joliette was planned to be Autoroute 50, however, these plans were later cancelled. A petition to upgrade the existing route to its formerly planned freeway status began circulating in 2014.

=== Autoroute 65 ===
Autoroute 65
- Autoroute de l'Amiante
- Existed: Project cancelled
- Length: 50 km (31 mi)
- South end: R-112 in Thetford Mines
- North end: A-20 (TCH) in Villeroy

Autoroute 65 was proposed in the 1970s and would have linked Thetford Mines to Autoroute 20 at Villeroy. It may have been planned as far south as an easterly extension of Autoroute 10 near Lambton.

=== Autoroute 415 ===
Autoroute 415
- Mount Royal Autoroute (Downtown loop – northern leg)
- Existed: Project cancelled
- Length: 7 km (4 mi)
- South end: A-15 in Montréal
- North end: A-19 (unbuilt section) in Montreal

Autoroute 415 had been proposed as the number of a planned autoroute in Montreal. This road was proposed in 1960, and would have connected Autoroute 15 (the Décarie Autoroute) at Monkland Avenue to Autoroute 19 at Rachel Street (on a connection between the present Autoroute 19 and the Jacques Cartier Bridge that was never built).

In its 1960 master highway plan, the Montreal Metropolitan Committee proposed a new 7 km (4.3 mi) long autoroute along the city's east–west street grid at the northern edge of downtown. The six-lane autoroute was forecast to handle as many as 4,500 vehicles per hour during weekday peak periods. Beginning at the Decarie Autoroute at Monkland Avenue in the Notre-Dame-de-Grâce section of the city (at the current EXIT 66 on Autoroute 15), the Mount Royal Autoroute was to extend in a northeastern direction through Westmount underneath Mount Royal Park before emerging above ground at Rachel Street connecting to the unbuilt Autoroute 19 section of what is now Papineau Avenue.

=== Autoroute 550 ===
Autoroute 550
- Autoroute Deschênes; Britannia-Deschênes Corridor
- Existed: 2007
- Length: n/a
- West end: Highway 416 in Ottawa
- East end: A-50 in Gatineau

Autoroute 550 would have served as a bypass of Gatineau and would have been a link across the Ottawa River to Highway 416 in the west end of Ottawa. It was planned to alleviate traffic along Autoroute 50 and Autoroute 5 in Gatineau, as well as traffic along Highway 417 and in downtown Ottawa. In 1996, the Quebec Ministry of Transportation stated in 1996 that there was no need for a Gatineau bypass, but it is keeping the corridor for a possible future boulevard or freeway in partnership with the National Capital Commission.

In 2006, the National Capital Capital Commission began a study about a new inter-provincial bridge between Ottawa and Gatineau; however, the focus is located east of downtown Ottawa and the Britannia-Deschênes Corridor was not included as part of the study.

=== Autoroute 640 ===
Autoroute 640
- Autoroute de Contournement Nord de Montréal; North Belt Autoroute
- Existed: Project cancelled
- Length: n/a
- East end: A-640 / R-344 in Oka
- West end: A-40 (TCH) in Vaudreuil-Dorion

Portion only: The initial plan for Autoroute 640 was to continue west from Oka, crossing Lac des Deux Montagnes, to Autoroute 40 in Vaudreuil-Dorion, potentially passing through Oka National Park and Aboriginal lands. The political sensitivity involved with constructing a freeway through a protected area and the 1990 land dispute regarding a golf course expansion have decreased the likelihood of the extension.

== See also ==
- Autoroutes of Quebec
