= Quebec Autoroute 730 =

Highway in Quebec

Autoroute 730
- Autoroute 730
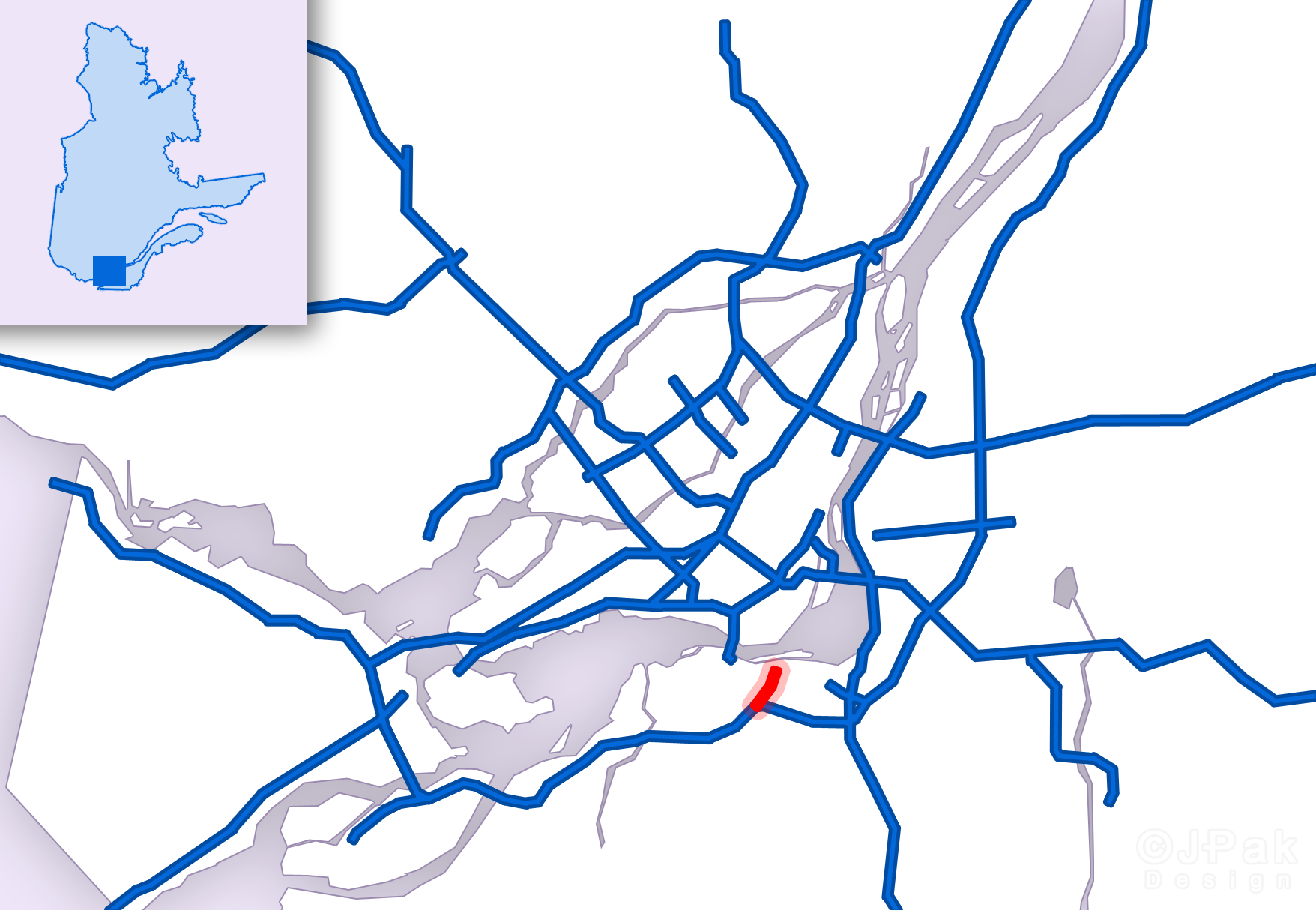

Route information
- Maintained by Transports Québec
- Length: 4.2 km (2.6 mi)
- Existed: 2010–present
- History: 1992 (opened as part of A-30)

Major junctions
- South end: A-30 in Saint-Constant
- North end: R-132 in Sainte-Catherine

Location
- Country: Canada
- Province: Quebec
- Major cities: Saint-Constant, Sainte-Catherine

Highway system
- Quebec provincial highways; Autoroutes; List; Former
← A-640	→ A-740

Autoroute 730 (A-730) is an autoroute located in the region of Montérégie, Quebec, Canada, and is a freeway spur of Autoroute 30. Originally opened in 1992, it was part of Autoroute 30 until November 19, 2010, when A-30 was realigned, resulting in the bypassed section becoming a collector highway. It extends from the A-30 / A-730 interchange to Route 132, just east of the Honoré Mercier Bridge, and is approximately 4.2 km (2.6 mi) long.

== Exit list ==
From south to north; old exit numbers are former A-30 exit numbers. The entire route is in Roussillon RCM.

Location	km	mi	Old exit	New exit	Destinations	Notes
Saint-Constant	0.0	0.0		1	A-30 – Vaudreuil-Dorion, Montreal, Sorel-Tracy, Quebec	Southern terminus; A-30 exit 47
Saint-Constant	2.0	1.2	90	2	Saint-Constant (Montée Saint-Régis)	
Sainte-Catherine	4.2	2.6			R-132 – Honoré Mercier Bridge, Montreal, Sainte-Catherine	Northern terminus; traffic signals
1.000 mi = 1.609 km; 1.000 km = 0.621 mi
