= Autoroutes of Quebec =

Highway system in Quebec, Canada

- Highway shields for Autoroutes 5, 20 and 640

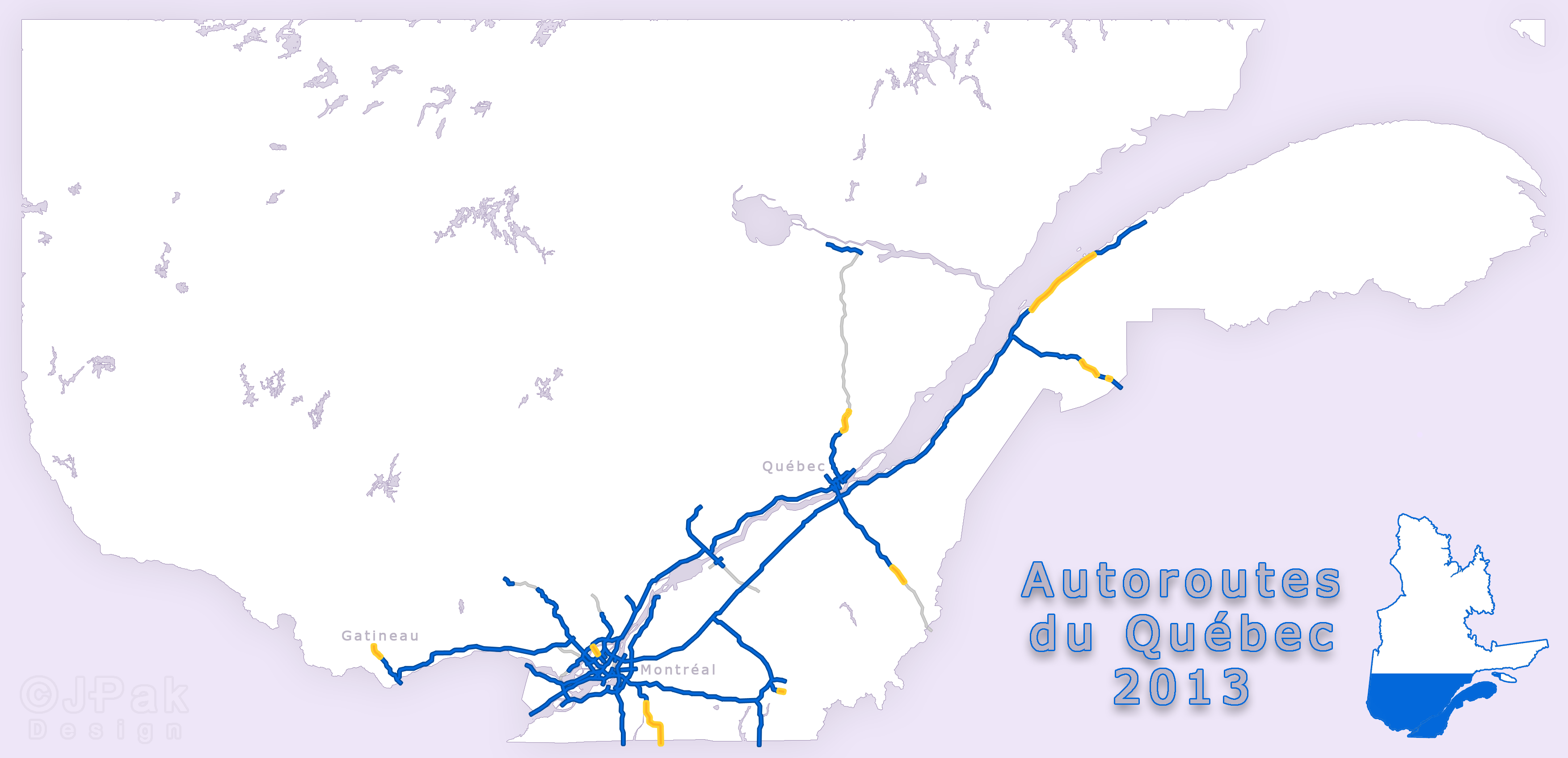
- The current Autoroute network in Quebec

System information
- Maintained by Transports Quebec (MTQ)
- Length: 2,417 km (1,502 mi)
- Formed: 1958

System links
- Quebec provincial highways; Autoroutes; List; Former

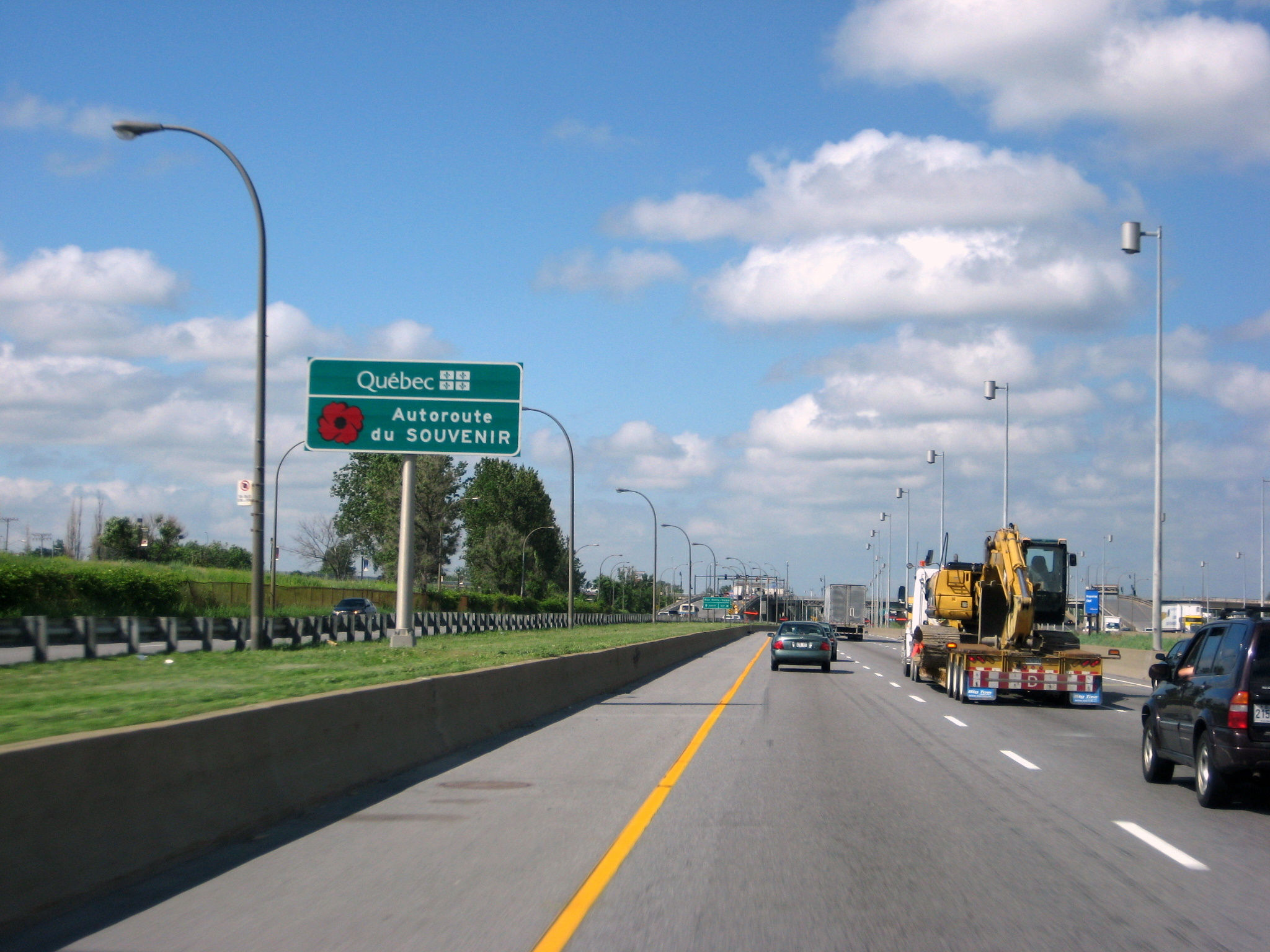
Quebec Autoroute 20 west in Montreal, ~km 66.

The Quebec Autoroute System (Note: French: Réseau autoroutier québécois, pronounced [ʁezo otɔʁutje kebekwa]) is a network of freeways within the province of Quebec, Canada, operating under the same principle of controlled access as the Interstate Highway System in the United States and the 400-series highways in neighbouring Ontario. The Autoroutes are the backbone of Quebec's highway system, spanning over 2,400 kilometres (1,500 miles). The speed limit on the Autoroutes is generally 100 km/h (62 mph) in rural areas and 70–90 km/h (43–56 mph) in urban areas; most roads are made of asphalt concrete.

The word "autoroute" is a blend of auto and route, equivalent to "freeway" or "motorway" in English, and it became the equivalent of "expressway" in French. In the 1950s, when the first Autoroutes were being planned, the design documents called them autostrades from the Italian word autostrada.

== Signage ==
Standard autoroute shield

Autoroutes are identified by blue-and-red shields, similar to the American Interstate system. The red header of the shield contains a white image representing a highway overpass, and the blue lower portion of the shield contains the autoroute's number in white, along with a fleur-de-lis, which is a provincial symbol of Quebec.

Most autoroute and road traffic signs in the province are in French, though English is also used on federally-financed or -owned routes, such as the Bonaventure Expressway in Montreal. To surmount the language barrier, however, most signs in Quebec use pictograms, and text is avoided in most cases, with the exceptions usually only being the names of control cities. Other exceptions that are posted in both languages is the illegal use of radar detectors when entering the province that reads "Détecteurs de radar interdits/Radar detectors prohibited", as well as areas where roads can be slippery due to melting ice and snow, marked "Degel/Thaw".

== Numbering system ==
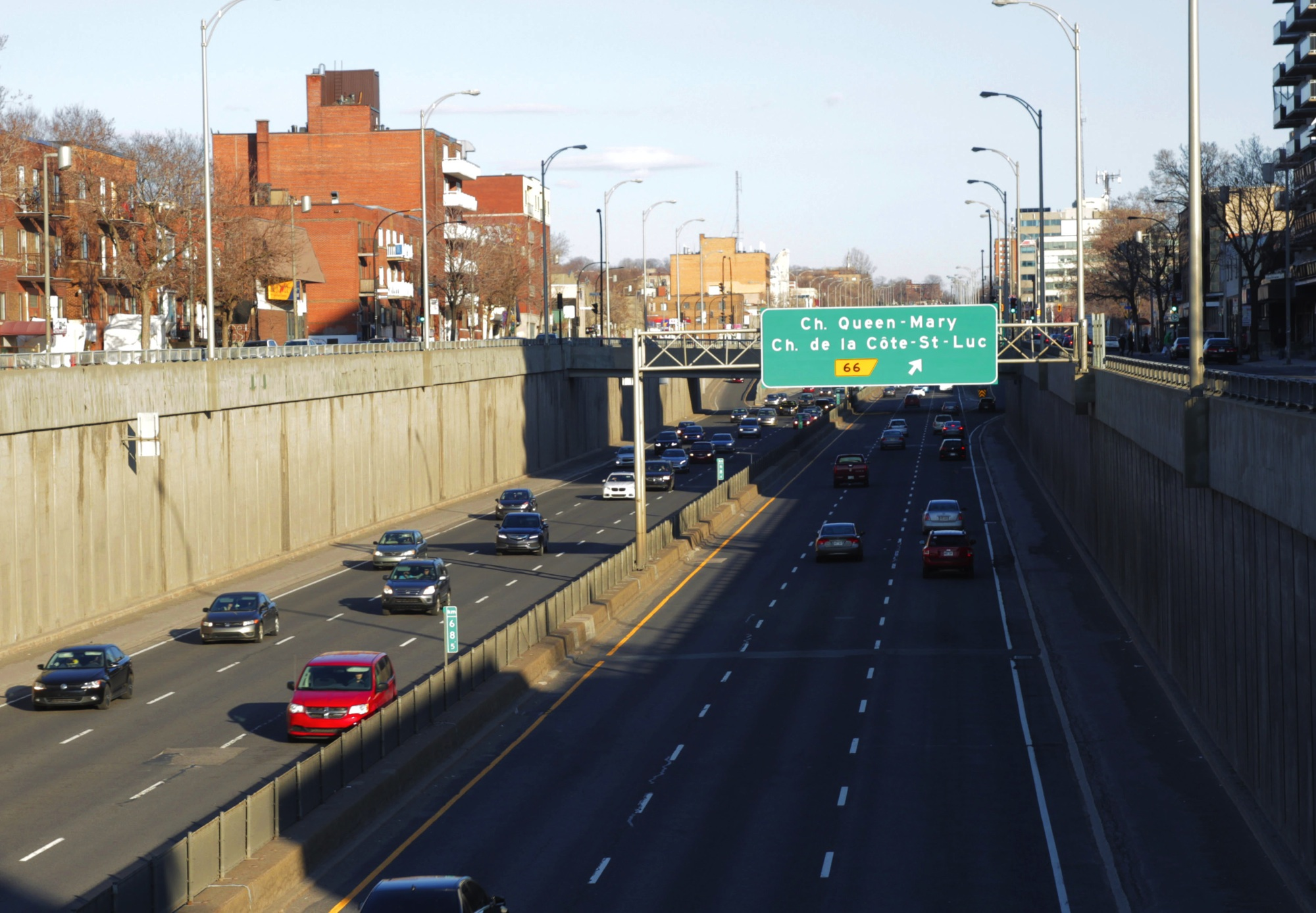
Drivers along southbound Autoroute 15 approach the exit for Queen Mary Road.

Autoroutes are divided into three types – principal routes, deviation routes, and collector routes – and are laid out and numbered in a fashion similar to the Interstate Highway System in the United States. The principal Autoroutes are the major highways of the province, and have single- or double-digit numbers. East-west Autoroutes running parallel to the Saint Lawrence River (for example, Autoroute 20 and Autoroute 40) are assigned even numbers, while north-south Autoroutes running perpendicular to the Saint Lawrence (such as Autoroute 5 and Autoroute 15) are given odd numbers. Deviation and collector Autoroutes both feature triple-digit numbers. Deviation routes are bypasses intended for truck traffic to circumvent urban areas, and are identified by an even number prefixing the number of the nearby Autoroute that it bypasses (for example, Autoroute 410 in Sherbrooke). Collector Autoroutes, by contrast, are spur routes into urban areas, and are identified by an odd number prefixing the number of the nearby Autoroute that it branches off of (such as Autoroute 973, a spur of Autoroute 73 towards downtown Quebec City).

== History ==
Quebec's first Autoroute was the Autoroute des Laurentides (Laurentian Autoroute), which opened in 1959 as a toll road. This initiative to bring freeways into Quebec was started by Maurice Duplessis, whose government saw the construction of the Laurentian Autoroute (now A-15) from Montreal to Saint-Jérôme and the first section of the Boulevard Métropolitain (A-40), which opened in 1960.

=== 1960s ===
It was the Quebec Liberal government of the 1960s that saw the construction of further Autoroutes, with a grid numbering system and the introduction of the blue and red shield. The sign is inspired by the American Interstate sign. This was especially needed in light of the fact that many visitors would be flocking to Montreal by car for Expo 67. Montreal's Autoroute Décarie (A-15) and the Louis-Hippolyte Lafontaine Bridge–Tunnel were constructed for that very reason. The Autoroute des Cantons-de-l'Est (Eastern Townships Autoroute - A-10) opened in 1964, and its continuation, A-55 between Magog and Rock Island, opened in 1967, connecting with Interstate 91. What are now the A-20 (part of the Trans-Canada Highway) and the A-15 to New York (connecting with Interstate 87), originally built in the 1940s, were upgraded to expressway standards. The A-20 also connects with Highway 401 in Ontario. A-40 was extended out to Berthierville, and later to Trois-Rivières in the 1970s. Others include Autoroutes 25, 30 (southern beltway), 31, 35 (eventually connecting to Interstate 89), Autoroute Laurentienne (73), and 640 (an unfinished proposed northern beltway).

=== 1970s ===
The 1970s also saw the completion of the Pierre Laporte Bridge in Quebec City, connecting the south shore of the Saint Lawrence River to the north. In addition to this, the A-73 was extended to Beauce, the A-20 was extended to Rivière-du-Loup, and the Chomedey Autoroute (A-13), the A-19 and the A-440 were constructed in Laval. Autoroutes were built (two sections of A-440, and A-740) and a few more planned in the Quebec City region, creating a dense web, which led to significant sprawl. In 1976, the Parti Québécois came to power, whose platform mandated an expansion of public transportation over the construction of more Autoroutes. Existing Autoroutes were extended (e.g., the A-40 was extended from Trois-Rivières to Quebec City) but no new Autoroutes were built.

The Autoroute des Laurentides, the Autoroute des Cantons-de-l'Est, the Autoroute de la Rive-Nord (North Shore Autoroute), and the A-13 were toll roads until the mid-1980s, when the toll barriers were removed and the province stopped collecting tolls from vehicles using the Autoroutes. The last toll booth was on the Champlain Bridge (A-10, A-15 and A-20). It was removed in 1990 because the Champlain Bridge is federal property and is thus not subject to provincial tolls.

=== 2000s ===
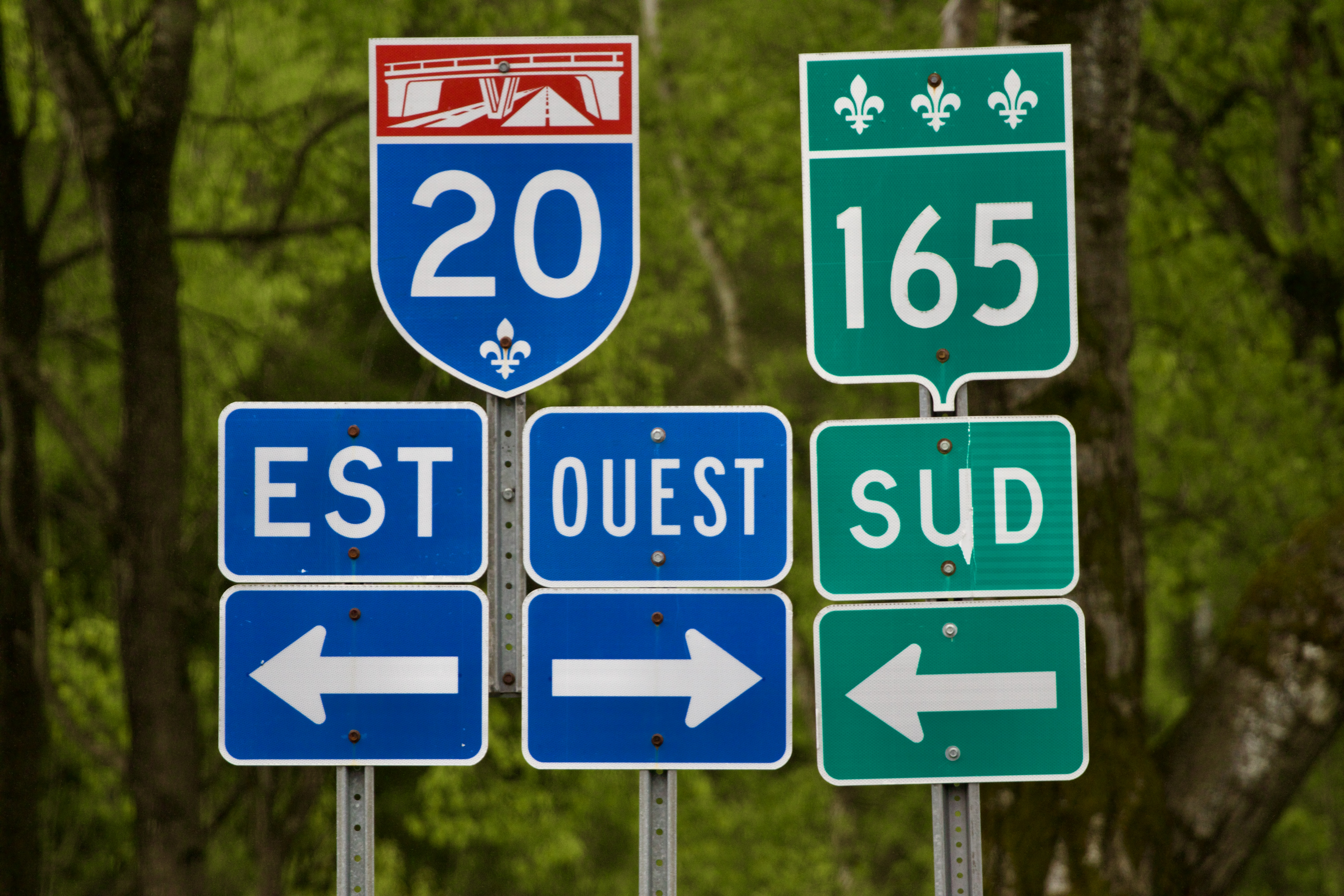
Road signs showing directions for Autoroute 20 and Route 165 in Quebec.

In the 2000s, there were several high-profile failures and collapses around some Autoroutes, due to aging and crumbling infrastructure, including the Boulevard du Souvenir overpass collapse, De la Concorde overpass collapse, and most recently the Ville-Marie tunnel collapse. An online poll by Léger Marketing conducted shortly after the Viger tunnel collapse found that 88 percent of Montrealers are "worried" about the state of roads, bridges and tunnels in the city, with more than half of respondents saying they are downright "scared" to drive under an overpass (58 percent), on a bridge (54 per cent), or through a tunnel (53 per cent). McGill University's Saeed Mirza stated that ill-advised design choices and poor-quality concrete were used in the construction rush ahead of Expo '67 and the 1976 Olympics. In particular, the concrete used was permeable with lack of proper drainage, and these allowed chlorides from de-icing salts to corrode the steel reinforcements.

== Main-class autoroutes ==
Number	Length (km)	Length (mi)	Southern or western terminus	Northern or eastern terminus	Local names	Formed	Removed	Notes
A-5	34.0	21.1	King Edward Avenue at Ontario boundary in Gatineau	R-105 / R-366 in Wakefield	Autoroute de la Gatineau	1964	current	
A-10	145.1	90.2	R-136 in Montreal	A-55 / A-610 in Sherbrooke	Autoroute Bonaventure, Autoroute des Cantons-de-l'Est	1962	current	
A-13	21.4	13.3	A-20 in Lachine	A-640 in Boisbriand	Autoroute Chomedey	1975	current	
A-15 (TCH)	164.0	101.9	I-87 at United States border at Lacolle	R-117 (TCH) in Sainte-Agathe-des-Monts	Autoroute Décarie, Autoroute des Laurentides	1958	current	Part of the Trans-Canada Highway between A-40 in Montreal and Sainte-Agathe-des-Monts.
A-19	10.1	6.3	Boulevard Henri-Bourassa in Montreal	A-440 / R-335 in Laval	Autoroute Papineau	1970	current	Being extended to A-640
A-20 (TCH)	534.5	332.1	Highway 401 at Ontario border at Rivière-Beaudette	R-132 in Notre-Dame-des-Neiges	Autoroute Jean-Lesage, Autoroute du Souvenir	1964	current	Part of the Trans-Canada Highway between A-25 in Longueuil and A-85 in Rivière-du-Loup.
A-20	45.2	28.1	R-132 in Rimouski	R-132 in Mont-Joli	Autoroute Jean-Lesage	1991	current	Future plans to connect to the western segment.
A-25 (TCH)	52.1	32.4	A-20 (TCH) in Longueuil	R-125 / R-158 in Saint-Esprit	Autoroute Louis-Hippolyte-La Fontaine	1967	current	Part of the Trans-Canada Highway between A-40 in Montreal and A-20 in Longueuil.
A-30	144.1	89.5	A-40 (TCH) in Vaudreuil-Dorion	R-132 in Sorel-Tracy	Autoroute de l'Acier	1968	current	
A-30	20.8	12.9	R-132 in Bécancour	R-132 in Bécancour	Autoroute de l'Acier	1975	current	No plans to connect to the western segment.
A-31	14.3	8.9	A-40 / R-131 in Lavaltrie	R-131 / R-158 in Joliette	Autoroute Antonio-Barrette	1966	current	
A-35	50.4	31.3	R-133 in Saint-Armand	A-10 in Chambly	Autoroute de la Vallée-des-Forts	1966	current	Extended almost to the United States border and I-89 in 2025.
A-40 (TCH)	347	216	Highway 417 / TCH at Ontario border near Pointe-Fortune	R-138 / R-368 near Boischatel	Autoroute Félix-Leclerc, Autoroute Métropolitaine, Autoroute Transcanadienne	1959	current	Part of the Trans-Canada Highway between Ontario and A-25 in Montreal.
A-50	159	99	Rue Montcalm in Gatineau	R-117 near Mirabel	Autoroute de l'Outaouais, Autoroute Maurice-Richard	1975	current	
A-55	247	153	I-91 at United States border at Stanstead	R-155 in Shawinigan	Autoroute Joseph-Armand-Bombardier, Autoroute de l'énergie	1964	current	
A-70	31.56	19.61	R-170 in Saguenay (Jonquière)	R-170 in Saguenay (Aéroport Bagotville)	Autoroute du Saguenay, Autoroute Alma-La Baie	1983	current	Autoroute 70 is being extended westward from Jonquière to Alma, and eastward from Aéroport CFB Bagotville to La Baie.
A-73	135.0	83.9	R-204 in Saint-Georges	R-175 in Stoneham-et-Tewkesbury	Autoroute Robert-Cliche, Autoroute Laurentienne, Autoroute Henri-IV	1963	current	Freeway continues another 15 km north as R-175
A-85 (TCH)	101	63	Route 2 (TCH) at New Brunswick border near Dégelis	A-20 (TCH) near Rivière-du-Loup	Autoroute Claude-Béchard	2005	current	Part of the Trans-Canada Highway for its full length.

== Spur-class Autoroutes ==
Number	Length (km)	Length (mi)	Southern or western terminus	Northern or eastern terminus	Local names	Formed	Removed	Notes
A-410	12.9	8.0	R-108 / R-143 in Sherbrooke	A-10 / A-55 in Sherbrooke	Autoroute Jacques-O'Bready, Autoroute de l'Université	1971	current	
A-440	18.2	11.3	A-13 / R-148 in Laval	A-25 in Laval	Autoroute Jean-Noël-Lavoie, Autoroute Laval	1974	current	
A-440	12.5	7.8	A-40 / A-73 in Québec	A-40 in Québec	Autoroute Charest, Autoroute Dufferin-Montmorency	1962	current	Two segments with a 4 km (2.5 mi) gap through downtown Quebec City; connection made via Boulevard Charest.
A-520	7.8	4.8	A-20 in Dorval	A-40 (TCH) in Montréal	Autoroute Côte de Liesse	1966	current	
A-530	12.9	8.0	R-132 / R-201 in Salaberry-de-Valleyfield	A-30 in Salaberry-de-Valleyfield		2012	current	Formerly part of A-30.
A-540	5.1	3.2	A-73 / R-175 in Québec	R-138 in Québec	Autoroute Duplessis	1966	current	
A-573	12.9	8.0	A-40 / A-73 in Québec	R-369 in Québec	Autoroute Henri-IV	1976	current	
A-610	10.3	6.4	A-10 / A-55 in Sherbrooke	R-112 in Sherbrooke	Autoroute Louis-Bilodeau	2006	current	Formerly part of A-10.
A-640	53.2	33.1	R-344 in Oka	R-344 in Charlemagne	Autoroute de contournement nord de Montréal	1961	current	
A-730	4.2	2.6	A-30 in Saint-Constant	R-132 in Saint-Constant		2010	current	Formerly part of A-30.
A-740	7.4	4.6	R-175 in Quebec	Boulevard Lebourgneuf in Québec	Autoroute Robert-Bourassa, Autoroute du Vallon	1975	current	
A-930	2.5	1.6	A-30 in Candiac	R-132 in Candiac		2011	current	Formerly part of A-30.
A-955	14.7	9.1	R-122 in Saint-Albert	A-20 (TCH) / A-55 in Sainte-Eulalie		1975	current	None of this highway is of freeway standard.
A-973	3.6	2.2	Rue du Chalutier / Rue du Prince-Édouard in Quebéc	A-40 / A-73 in Quebec		1983	current	Cosigned with Route 175 for its entire length.

== Other routes built to freeway standards ==
Number	Length (km)	Length (mi)	Southern or western terminus	Northern or eastern terminus	Local names	Formed	Removed	Notes
R-116	11	6.8	R-134 in Longueuil	Boul. Seigneurial in St-Bruno-de-Montarville	Boul. Wilfrid Laurier	—	—	Route 116 continues eastward towards Lévis as a regular route
R-136	8	5.0	A-15 and A-20 in Montréal	Avenue Papineau in Montréal	Autoroute Ville-Marie	2021	current	Former A-720

== Former and unbuilt autoroutes ==
Number	Length (km)	Length (mi)	Southern or western terminus	Northern or eastern terminus	Local names	Formed	Removed	Notes
A-6	55	34	A-15 in La Prairie	Route 235 in Farnham	Richelieu Autoroute, Autoroute Haut-Richelieu	—	—	A-6 was to roughly parallel Route 104. The western half of the route was cancelled by the mid-1970s while the rest of the route was abandoned a few years later.
A-9	12	7.5	A-40 in Pointe-Fortune	A-50 in Lachute	Pointe Fortune-Lachute Autoroute	—	—	A-9 was to provide a fixed crossing over the Ottawa River but was cancelled.
A-16	9	5.6	R-134	A-30 in Longueuil	Autoroute Wilfrid-Laurier	—	—	Reserved for autoroute conversion of Boulevard Wilfrid-Laurier (Route 112 and Route 116).
A-18	—	—	A-55 near Victoriaville	Proposed A-65 in Plessisville	Autoroute des Bois-Francs	—	—	Unbuilt.
A-51	45	28	Route 116 near Melbourne	A-20 in Drummondville		1974	1982	Renamed A-55.
A-65	—	—	Thetford Mines	A-20 in Villeroy	Autoroute de l'Amiante	—	—	Unbuilt. Possible extension to A-10 near Lambton.
A-415	7	4.3	A-15 in Montréal	A-19 (unbuilt section) in Montreal	Mount Royal Autoroute	—	—	Cancelled northern leg of a proposed downtown freeway loop.
A-430	—	—	A-15 / A-30 in Candiac	A-30 in Varennes		—	—	Several kilometers of Route 132 north and south of A-20 was designated A-430 on paper in the 1970s.
A-540	4.9	3.0	A-20 in Vaudreuil-Dorion	A-40 in Vaudreuil-Dorion		1967	2012	Renamed A-30.
A-550	—	—	Ontario boundary in Gatineau (Would continue as Highway 416 in Ottawa)	A-50 in Gatineau	Deschênes Autoroute, Britannia-Deschênes corridor	—	—	Gatineau bypass, including a new bridge across the Ottawa River.
A-720	8.1	5.0	A-15 / A-20 in Montréal	Rue Notre-Dame in Montréal	Autoroute Ville-Marie	1972	2021	Renamed R-136.
A-755	10	6.2	A-55 in Trois-Rivières	A-40 in Trois-Rivières	Autoroute de Francheville	1977	c. 1990	Renamed A-40.
Former

== See also ==
- Freeway (Canada)
- Highway
- List of Quebec provincial highways
- List of former and unbuilt autoroutes of Quebec
- Toll road
- Transports Québec
- 100-Series Highways (Nova Scotia) (not to be confused with Quebec's highway system that sets itself apart from the Autoroutes)
- 400-series highways (Ontario)
- 400-series highways (British Columbia) (former series)
