= Quebec Autoroute 930 =

Highway in Quebec

Autoroute 930
- Autoroute 930
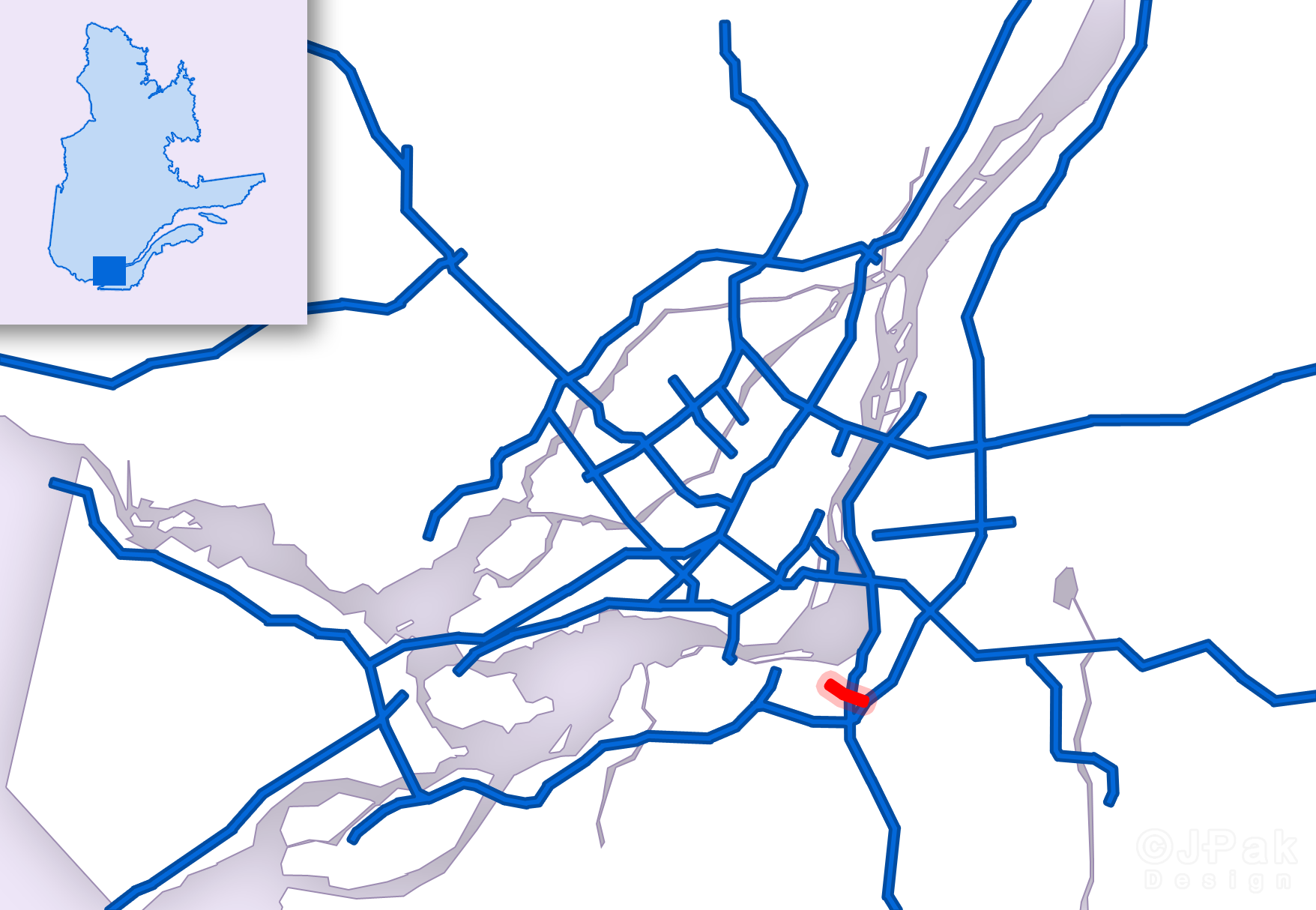

Route information
- Maintained by Transports Québec
- Length: 2.5 km (1.6 mi)
- Existed: 2011–present
- History: Opened 1996 (as part of A-30)

Major junctions
- West end: A-15 / R-132 in Candiac
- East end: A-30 in Candiac

Location
- Country: Canada
- Province: Quebec
- Major cities: Candiac

Highway system
- Quebec provincial highways; Autoroutes; List; Former
← A-740	→ A-955

Autoroute 930 (A-930) is an autoroute located Candiac, Montérégie, Quebec, and is a freeway spur of Autoroute 30. Originally opened in 1996, it was part of Autoroute 30 until November 6, 2011, when A-30 was realigned and extended west. It extends from the A-30 / A-930 interchange to the Autoroute 15 / Route 132 interchange before becoming part of Route 132 and is approximately 2.5 km (1.6 mi) long.

== Exit list ==
From west to east; old exit numbers are former A-30 exit numbers.

The entire route is in Candiac, Roussillon RCM.

km	mi	Old exit	New exit	Destinations	Notes
		98	2S-N	R-132 west – Saint-Constant, Sainte-Catherine A-15 / A-30 west / R-132 east to I-87 – New York, Montreal, La Prairie	Western terminus; A-15 exit 42; formerly signed as 98-S and 98-N; continues as R-132 west
		99	3	Boulevard Jean-Leman – Candiac, Saint-Philippe	
			—	A-30 – H. Mercier Bridge, Vaudreuil-Dorion, Sorel-Tracy, Quebec	Eastern terminus; A-30 exit 58; westbound exit and eastbound entrance to A-30
1.000 mi = 1.609 km; 1.000 km = 0.621 mi: Incomplete access
