= Delson =

- City
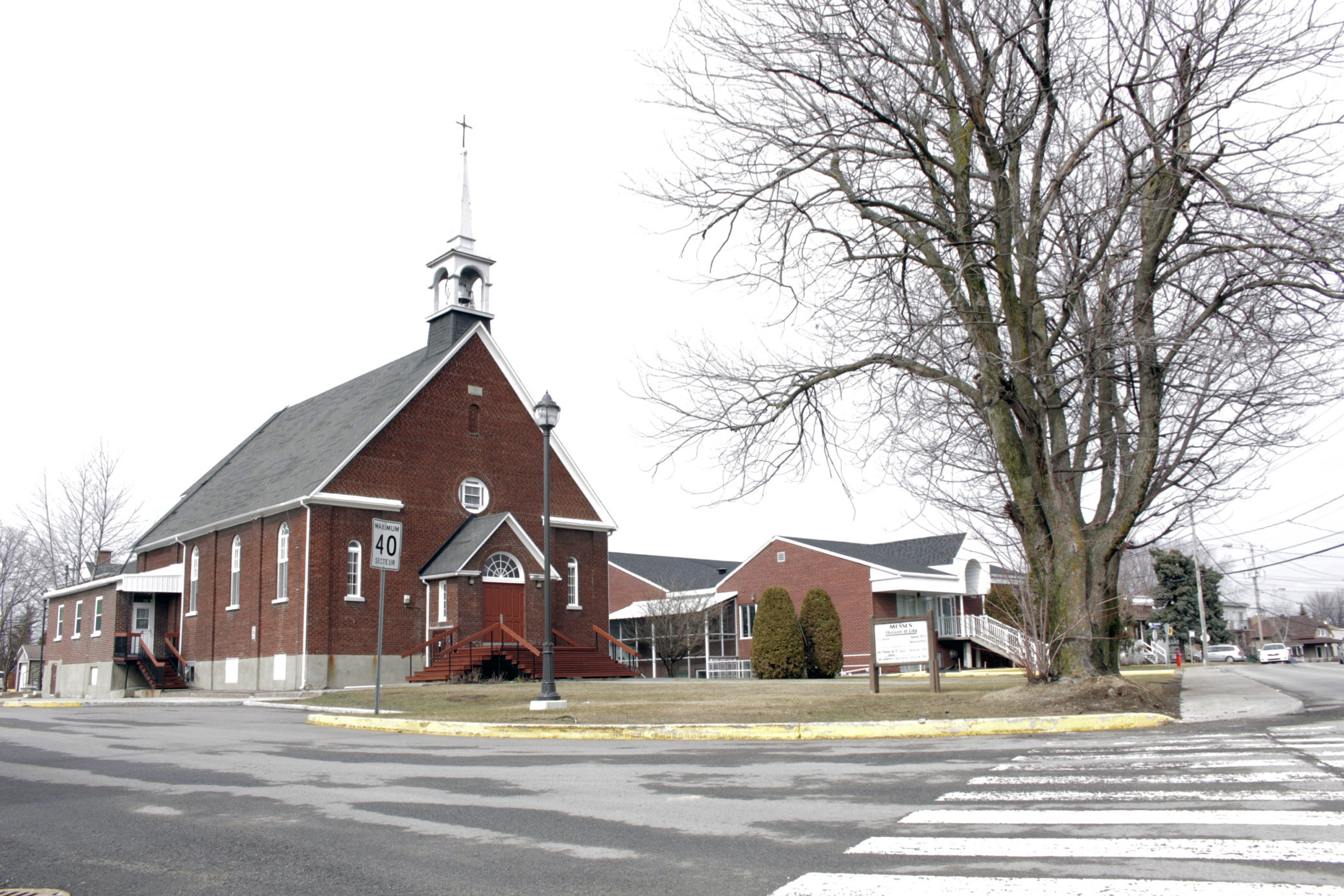
- Church in Delson

- Coat of arms
- Motto: Constantia Fide Et Amore
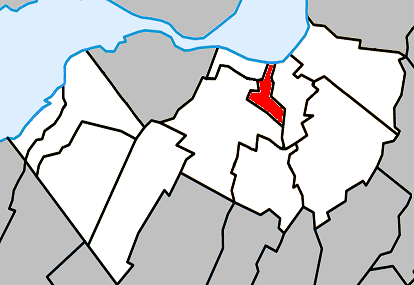
- Location within Roussillon RCM

- Location in southern Quebec
- Coordinates: 45.37°N 73.55°W
- Country: Canada
- Province: Quebec
- Region: Montérégie
- RCM: Roussillon
- Constituted: January 4, 1918

Government
  - Mayor: Christian Ouellette
  - Federal riding: La Prairie
  - Prov. riding: La Prairie

Area
  - Total: 7.70 km^{2} (2.97 sq mi)
  - Land: 7.64 km^{2} (2.95 sq mi)

Population (2021)
  - Total: 8,328
  - Density: 1,089.6/km^{2} (2,822/sq mi)
  - Pop 2016–2021: ▲11.7%
  - Dwellings: 3,561
- Time zone: UTC−5 (EST)
  - Summer (DST): UTC−4 (EDT)
- Postal code(s): J5B
- Area codes: 450 and 579
- Highways A-15 A-30 A-930: R-132; R-209
- Website: www.ville.delson.qc.ca

Delson is an off-island suburb (South shore) of Montreal, Quebec, Canada. It is situated 8 mi/13 km SSE of Montreal within the regional county municipality of Roussillon in the administrative region of Montérégie. The population as of the Canada 2021 Census was 8,328.

On its small territory, Delson is crossed by Route 132 and the Turtle River (Rivière de la Tortue). The city owns a portion of the Champlain industrial park as well as the Delson commuter train station with service to and from Montreal on the AMT's Candiac Line.

== History ==
The origin of the name Delson comes from the Delaware and Hudson Railway, now a subsidiary of the Canadian Pacific Railway, which runs through the town. The Canadian Railway Museum (Exporail) occupies a large tract between Delson and Saint-Constant.

Delson was founded in 1918 as a village municipality before obtaining its status of a city 21 February 1957. The village of Delson was created from three parishes: St Andrews (1924) of the United Church and St David (1938) of the Anglican church, as well as Sainte-Thérèse-de-l'Enfant-Jésus (1932) of the Catholic faith.

== Geography ==
The city lies along the south shore of the Saint Lawrence River, south of the island of Montreal.

=== Lakes & Rivers ===
The following waterways pass through or are situated within the municipality's boundaries:

- Rivière de la Tortue (45°24′06″N 73°32′11″W) – runs south to north through the center of Delson, emptying into the Saint Lawrence River.

== Demographics ==
Historical Census Data – Delson, Quebec
Year	Pop.	±%
1921	428	—
1931	715	+67.1%
1941	570	−20.3%
1951	682	+19.6%
1956	816	+19.6%
1961	2,075	+154.3%
1966	2,601	+25.3%
1971	2,941	+13.1%
1976	4,241	+44.2%
1981	4,935	+16.4%
1986	4,997	+1.3%
1991	6,063	+21.3%
1996	6,703	+10.6%
2001	7,024	+4.8%
2006	7,322	+4.2%
2011	7,462	+1.9%
2016	7,457	−0.1%
2021	8,328	+11.7%

In the 2021 Census of Population conducted by Statistics Canada, Delson had a population of 8,328 living in 3,479 of its 3,561 total private dwellings, a change of 11.7% from its 2016 population of 7,457. With a land area of 7.64 km^{2} (2.95 sq mi), it had a population density of 1,090.1/km^{2} (2,823.2/sq mi) in 2021.

Canada census – Delson community profile

	2021	2016	2011
Population	8,328 (+11.7% from 2016)	7,457 (-0.1% from 2011)	7,462 (+1.9% from 2006)
Land area	7.64 km^{2} (2.95 sq mi)	7.63 km^{2} (2.95 sq mi)	7.59 km^{2} (2.93 sq mi)
Population density	1,089.6/km^{2} (2,822/sq mi)	977.7/km^{2} (2,532/sq mi)	982.6/km^{2} (2,545/sq mi)
Median age	42.4 (M: 41.2, F: 43.2)	39.9 (M: 39.1, F: 40.8)	38.0 (M: 37.4, F: 38.5)
Private dwellings	3,561 (total) 3,479 (occupied)	2,950 (total)	2,911 (total)
Median household income	$87,000	$80,841	$70,583

References: 2021 2016 2011

Canada Census Mother Tongue – Delson, Quebec
Census	Total	French			English			French & English			Other		
Year	Responses	Count	Trend	Pop %	Count	Trend	Pop %	Count	Trend	Pop %	Count	Trend	Pop %
2021	8,330	6,785	▲6.6%	81.5%	485	▲18.3%	5.8%	160	▲33.3%	1.9%	790	▲53.4%	9.5%
2016	7,455	6,365	▼2.1%	85.4%	410	▼2.4%	5.5%	120	▲60.0%	1.6%	515	▲19.8%	6.9%
2011	7,425	6,500	▲0.9%	87.5%	420	▼18.4%	5.7%	75	▲15.4%	1.0%	430	▲50.9%	5.8%
2006	7,305	6,440	▼1.6%	88.2%	515	▲102.0%	7.1%	65	▲ n/a%	0.9%	285	▲32.6%	3.9%
2001	7,015	6,545	▲8.5%	93.3%	255	▼42.7%	3.6%	0	▼100.0%	0.0%	215	▲72.0%	3.1%
1996	6,695	6,030	n/a	90.1%	445	n/a	6.6%	95	n/a	1.4%	125	n/a	1.9%

== Notable people ==
Delson is the hometown of retired NHL goalie Marcel Cousineau.

== See also ==
- Roussillon Regional County Municipality
- Rivière de la Tortue (Delson)
- List of cities in Quebec
