= Quebec Autoroute 973 =

Highway in Quebec

Autoroute 973
- Autoroute Laurentienne
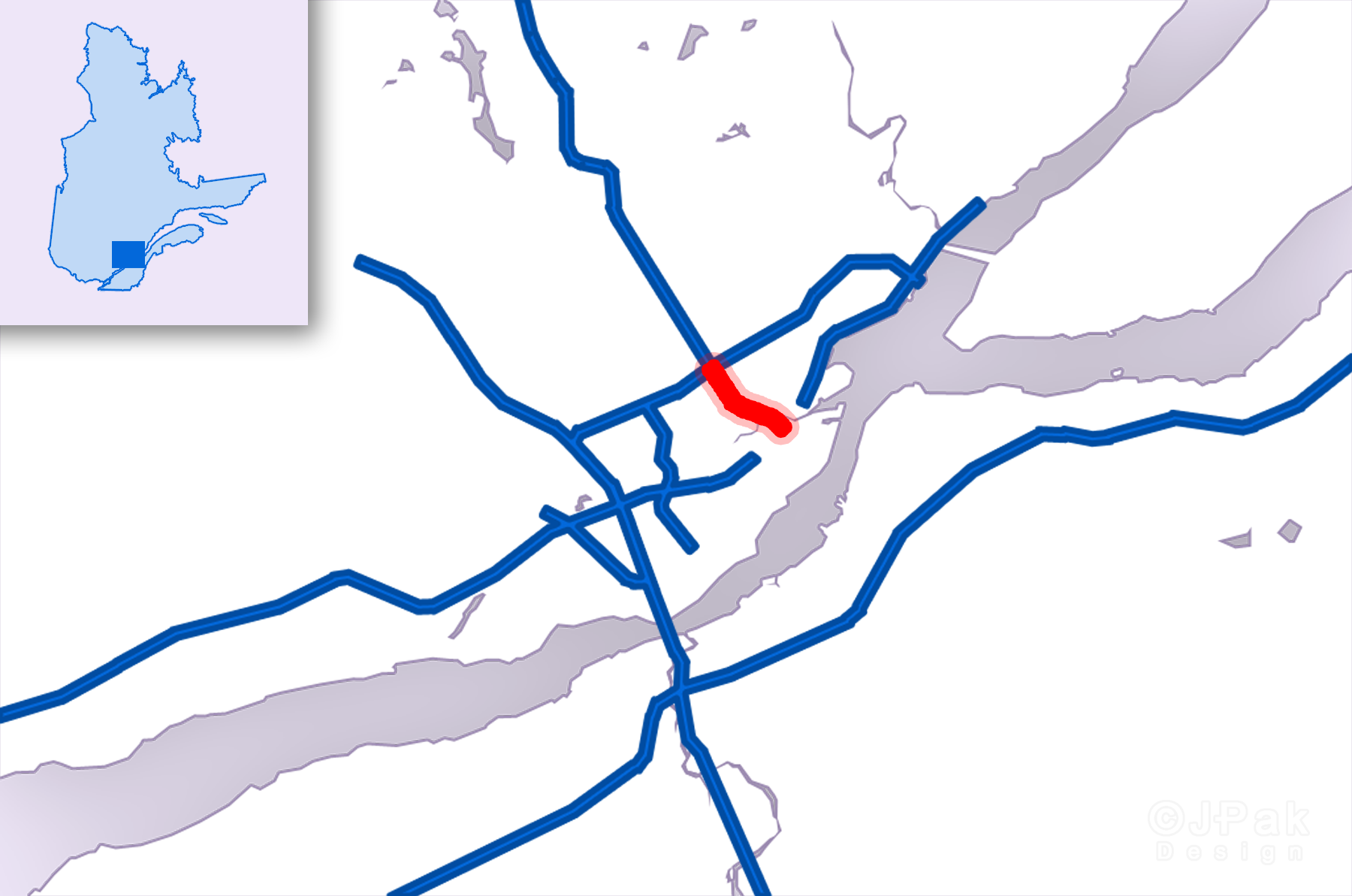

Route information
- Maintained by Transports Québec
- Length: 3.4 km (2.1 mi)
- Existed: 1963–present

Major junctions
- South end: R-175 in Québec
- North end: A-40 / A-73 / R-175 in Québec

Location
- Country: Canada
- Province: Quebec
- Major cities: Québec

Highway system
- Quebec provincial highways; Autoroutes; List; Former
← A-955	→ A-5

Autoroute 973 (A-973), also known as Autoroute Laurentienne, is an Autoroute highway in the Canadian province of Quebec that is a spur route of Autoroute 73 in Quebec City. At 3 kilometres (2 mi) long, it connects downtown Quebec City to Autoroute 40, after which it continues north as Autoroute 73.

== Route description ==
The segment of Laurentien Boulevard was built in 1956 between Dorchester Street and Wilfrid Hamel Boulevard, with the second segment reaching Notre-Dame-des-Laurentides in 1963. The road was finally extended to Stoneham-et-Tewkesbury in 1994. Laurentien Boulevard became an Autoroute in 1983, and obtained two different numbers; south of Autoroute 40, Autoroute Laurentienne is numbered Autoroute 973, while to the north, it is Autoroute 73. It is currently the highest numbered Quebec highway.

== Future ==
In January 2020, as an option for the proposed Quebec–Lévis third link, the Quebec government proposed extending Autoroute 973 to Autoroute 20 south by tunneling underneath the Quebec hill, St. Lawrence River, and central Lévis. The original tunnel proposal was a continuation of Autoroute 40 to Autoroute 20 passing under Île d'Orléans; however, François Bonnardel, the Minister of Transport, proposed a route that would connect the St-Roch district and the Desjardins borough of Lévis. The proposal involved the installation of a tram bus with seven stations and would connect with the Quebec City tramway.

== Exit list ==
The entire route is located in Quebec City, Québec TE.

km	mi	Exit	Destinations	Notes
0.0	0.0	–	Rue Dorchester (R-175 south) Rue de la Croix-Rouge, 4^{e} Rue, Pont Drouin, Rue du Cardinal-Maurice-Roy	At-grade; A-973 southern terminus; south end of R-175 concurrency; R-175 continues south
0.5	0.31	2	Rue Lee, Rue du Cardinal-Maurice-Roy	
0.8	0.50	3	Rue Bourdages	Southbound entrance and exit
1.4	0.87	4	Boulevard Wilfrid-Hamel (R-138)	Southbound signed as 4-O (west) and 4-E (east)
2.0	1.2	5	Rue Soumande	
2.4	1.5	6	Boulevard des Cèdres	Northbound entrance and exit
3.4	2.1	7	A-40 / A-73 south (Autoroute Félix Leclerc) – Montréal, Jean Lesage International Airport, Pont P.-Laporte, Sainte-Anne-de-Beaupre	A-973 northern terminus; north end of R-175 concurrency; signed as exits 7-E (east) and 7-O (west); A-40 / A-73 north exit 313; A-73 south exit 148; A-73 / R-175 continue north
3.4	2.1	–	A-73 north / R-175 north (Autoroute Laurentienne) – Saguenay	A-973 northern terminus; north end of R-175 concurrency; signed as exits 7-E (east) and 7-O (west); A-40 / A-73 north exit 313; A-73 south exit 148; A-73 / R-175 continue north
1.000 mi = 1.609 km; 1.000 km = 0.621 mi: Concurrency terminus; Incomplete access
