= Sainte-Catherine, Quebec =

Sainte-Catherine
- City
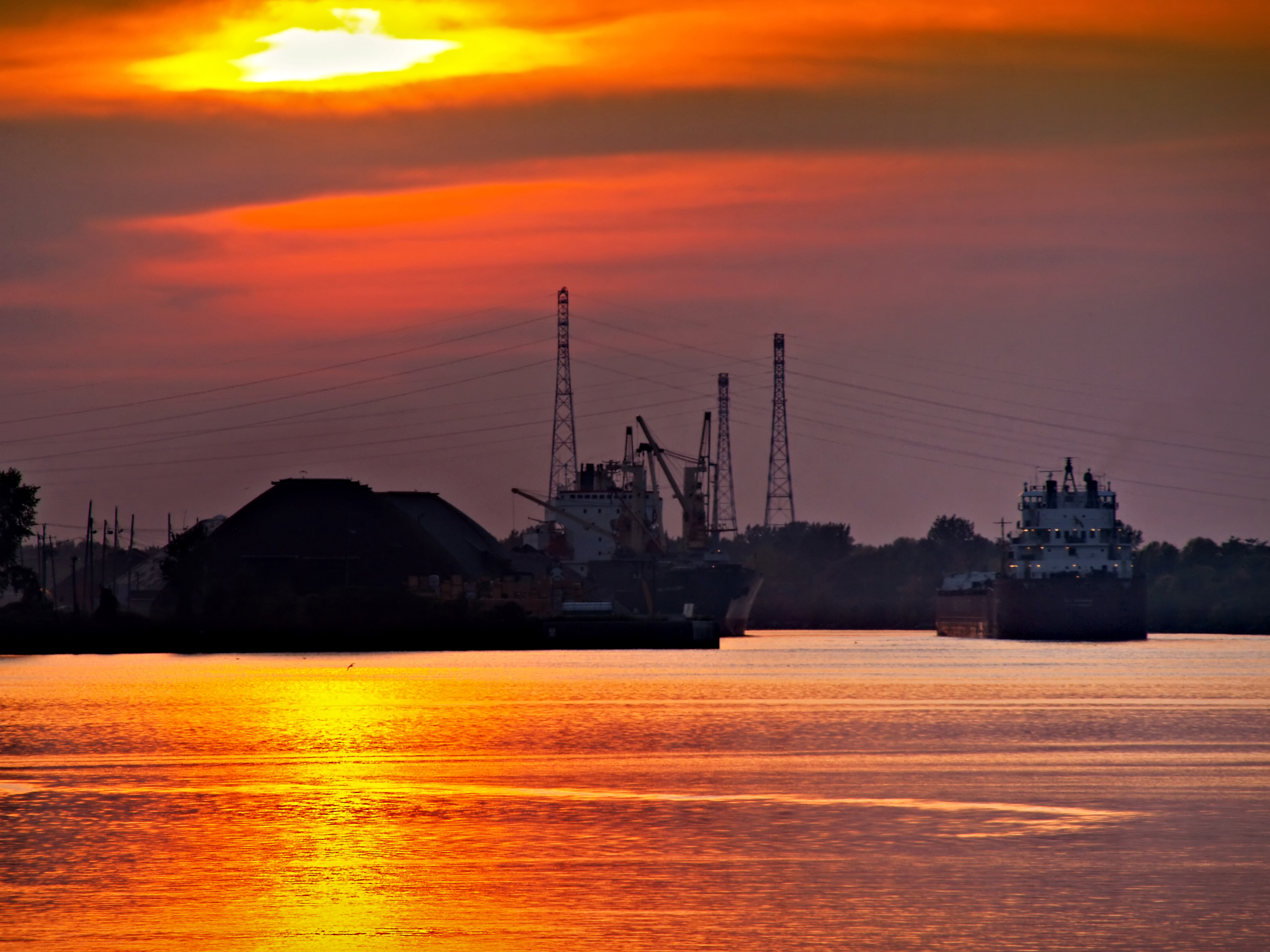
- Saint Lawrence Seaway at Sainte-Catherine

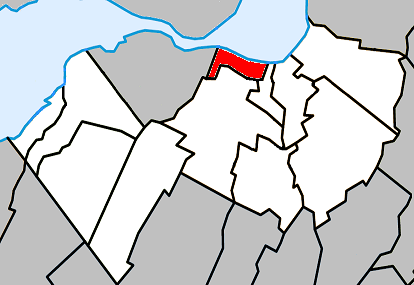
- Location within Roussillon RCM

- Location in southern Quebec
- Coordinates: 45.40402°N 73.5704°W
- Country: Canada
- Province: Quebec
- Region: Montérégie
- RCM: Roussillon
- Constituted: October 30, 1937

Government
  - Mayor: Sylvain Bouchard
  - Federal riding: La Prairie
  - Prov. riding: Sanguinet

Area
  - Total: 16.00 km^{2} (6.18 sq mi)
  - Land: 9.37 km^{2} (3.62 sq mi)

Population (2021)
  - Total: 17,347
  - Density: 1,851.4/km^{2} (4,795/sq mi)
  - Pop 2016–2021: ▲1.8%
  - Dwellings: 7,016
- Time zone: UTC−5 (EST)
  - Summer (DST): UTC−4 (EDT)
- Postal code(s): J5C
- Area codes: 450 and 579
- Highways A-30: R-132
- Website: www.ville.sainte-catherine.qc.ca

Sainte-Catherine (French pronunciation: [sɛ̃t katʁin]) is an off-island suburb of Montreal, in southwestern Quebec, Canada, on the St. Lawrence River in the Regional County Municipality of Roussillon. The population as of the Canada 2021 Census was 17,347.

== History ==
The land had been occupied for more than three centuries, since the establishment of the Iroquois mission in 1676, it is only in 1937 that the founding of la paroisse de Sainte-Catherine de Laprairie really marks a territorial organization. In 1973, a demographic boom finally granted the status of town to the village. In 2006, according to the city's official site, there were 17,000 inhabitants in Sainte-Catherine.

The inauguration of the Honoré Mercier Bridge in 1934, and then of the Champlain Bridge in 1962, greatly boosted the local economy.

== Demographics ==
Historical Census Data – Sainte-Catherine, Quebec
| Year | Pop. | ±% |
|---|---|---|
| 1941 | 365 | — |
| 1951 | 614 | +68.2% |
| 1956 | 1,487 | +142.2% |
| 1961 | 2,084 | +40.1% |
| 1966 | 2,801 | +34.4% |
| 1971 | 3,934 | +40.4% |
| 1976 | 5,036 | +28.0% |
| 1981 | 6,372 | +26.5% |
| 1986 | 7,020 | +10.2% |
| 1991 | 9,805 | +39.7% |
| 1996 | 13,724 | +40.0% |
| 2001 | 15,953 | +16.2% |
| 2006 | 16,211 | +1.6% |
| 2011 | 16,762 | +3.4% |
| 2016 | 17,047 | +1.7% |
| 2021 | 17,347 | +1.8% |

In the 2021 Census of Population conducted by Statistics Canada, Sainte-Catherine had a population of 17,347 living in 6,909 of its 7,016 total private dwellings, a change of 1.8% from its 2016 population of 17,047. With a land area of 9.37 km^{2} (3.62 sq mi), it had a population density of 1,851.3/km^{2} (4,794.9/sq mi) in 2021.

Canada census – Sainte-Catherine community profile

| | 2021 | 2016 | 2011 |
| Population | 17,347 (+1.8% from 2016) | 17,047 (+1.7% from 2011) | 16,762 (+3.4% from 2006) |
| Land area | 9.37 km^{2} (3.62 sq mi) | 9.42 km^{2} (3.64 sq mi) | 9.50 km^{2} (3.67 sq mi) |
| Population density | 1,851.4/km^{2} (4,795/sq mi) | 1,809.4/km^{2} (4,686/sq mi) | 1,764.1/km^{2} (4,569/sq mi) |
| Median age | 43.6 (M: 42, F: 45.2) | 41.9 (M: 40.3, F: 43.4) | 39.3 (M: 38.1, F: 40.4) |
| Private dwellings | 6,905 (total) | 6,845 (total) | 6,652 (total) |
| Median household income | $89,000 | $76,090 | $68,634 |

References: 2021 2016 2011

Canada Census Mother Tongue – Sainte-Catherine, Quebec
| Census | Total | French | | | English | | | French & English | | | Other | | |
| Year | Responses | Count | Trend | Pop % | Count | Trend | Pop % | Count | Trend | Pop % | Count | Trend | Pop % |
| 2021 | 16,965 | 14,010 | ▼6.3% | 82.6% | 740 | ▲17.5% | 4.4% | 240 | ▲54.8% | 1.4% | 1,695 | ▲54.1% | 10.0% |
| 2016 | 16,980 | 14,950 | ▼0.6% | 88.04% | 630 | ▼0.06% | 3.71% | 155 | ▲10% | 0.91% | 1,100 | ▲34.96% | 6.47% |
| 2011 | 16,670 | 15,040 | ▲0.8% | 90.22% | 675 | ▲39.2% | 4.05% | 140 | ▲40.0% | 0.84% | 815 | ▲61.4% | 4.89% |
| 2006 | 16,005 | 14,915 | ▲1.4% | 93.19% | 485 | ▼28.7% | 3.03% | 100 | ▼4.8% | 0.62% | 505 | ▲11.0% | 3.16% |
| 2001 | 15,945 | 14,705 | ▲14.0% | 92.22% | 680 | ▲41.7% | 4.26% | 105 | 0.0% | 0.66% | 455 | ▲97.8% | 2.85% |
| 1996 | 13,710 | 12,895 | n/a | 94.06% | 480 | n/a | 3.50% | 105 | n/a | 0.76% | 230 | n/a | 1.68% |

== Economy ==
In 1934, the inauguration of the Honoré Mercier Bridge, linking Kahnawake, an indigenous territory bordering the west side of the city, and Châteauguay to the south of the island of Montreal, gave a major boost to the economy. Some thirty years later, the opening of the Champlain Bridge also greatly helped the regional economy. The construction of the Côte-Sainte-Catherine lock on the St. Lawrence Seaway, which passes through Sainte-Catherine, in the late 1950s also gave this small municipality a huge boost in terms of socio-economic development. A major commercial zone is also located along Route 132.

== Notable people ==
- Guillaume Latendresse, NHL player
- Pierre Carl Ouellet, professional wrestler
- Karine Sergerie, women's taekwondo champion, Olympian

== See also ==
- Saint-Regis River
- List of cities in Quebec
