= Quebec Autoroute 540 (Vaudreuil-Dorion) =

Former highway in Vaudreuil-Dorion, Quebec

Autoroute 540
- Autoroute des Briquets
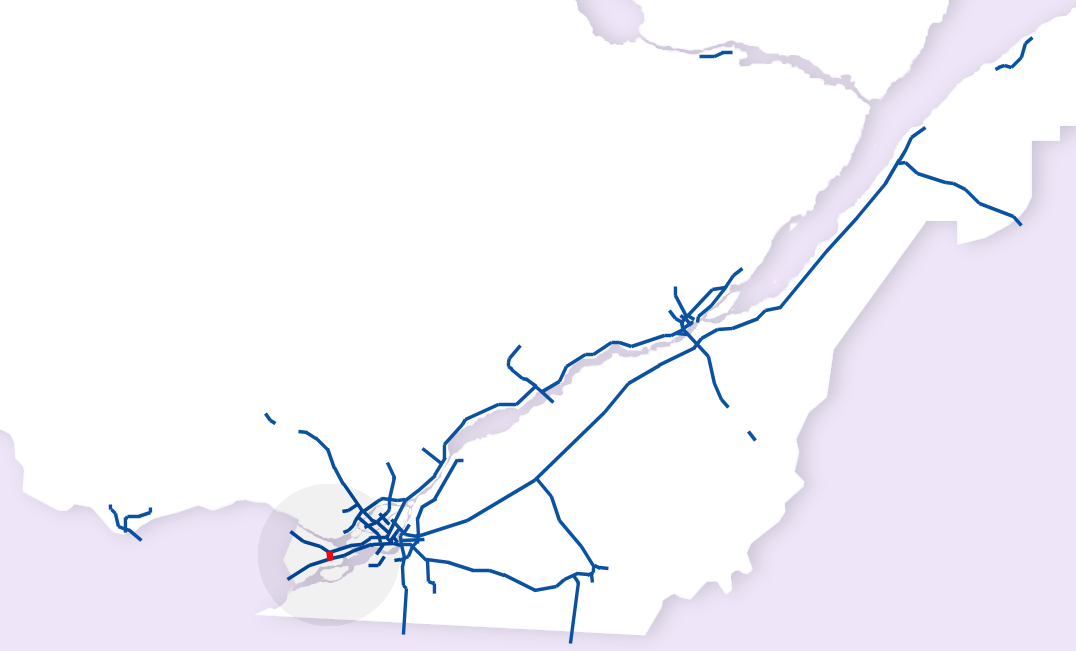

Route information
- Maintained by Transports Québec
- Length: 4.9 km (3.0 mi)
- Existed: 1967–2012
- History: Replaced by A-30

Major junctions
- South end: A-20 in Vaudreuil-Dorion
- North end: A-40 (TCH) in Vaudreuil-Dorion

Location
- Country: Canada
- Province: Quebec
- Major cities: Vaudreuil-Dorion

Highway system
- Quebec provincial highways; Autoroutes; List; Former
← A-520	→ A-540

Autoroute 540 (Vaudreuil-Dorion) was a short spur route that connected Autoroute 20 to Autoroute 40, providing a direct freeway link from Windsor, Ontario (via Highway 401) to Quebec City, Rivière-du-Loup, and points east through A-40, bypassing a segment of A-20 which currently has several at-grade intersections in Vaudreuil-Dorion as a multi-lane divided road. A-540 was the shortest numbered Autoroute.

== Absorption as part of Autoroute 30 ==
In 2006, construction began to extend Autoroute 30 north of the St. Lawrence River (over a new crossing) to the existing junction with Autoroute 540 and Autoroute 20, necessitating reconstruction of that interchange from a three-way to a four-way junction. Once that was completed in December 2012, A-540 was annexed and re-designated as an extension of Autoroute 30, while the old alignment of A-30 south of Salaberry-de-Valleyfield was renamed Autoroute 530. This made the expanded A-30 a ring road serving the southwestern part of the Montreal metropolitan area.

== Exit list ==
From south to north. The entire route was located in Vaudreuil-Dorion, Vaudreuil-Soulanges Regional County Municipality.

km	mi	Exit	Destinations	Notes
		1	A-20 (Autoroute du Souvenir) – Centre-Ville Montréal, Toronto	
		2	R-342 (Route Harwood)	Northbound exit and entrance
		3	R-340 (Boulevard de la Cité-des-Jeunes)	
		5	A-40 (TCH) to Highway 417 – Montréal, Mirabel Airport, Ottawa, Gatineau	
1.000 mi = 1.609 km; 1.000 km = 0.621 mi: Incomplete access
