= Quebec Autoroute 30 =

Highway in Quebec

Autoroute 30
- Autoroute de l'Acier

Route information
- Maintained by Transports Québec
- Existed: 1968–present

Main section
- Length: 144.1 km (89.5 mi)
- West end: A-40 (TCH) in Vaudreuil-Dorion
- Major intersections: A-20 in Vaudreuil-Dorion; A-530 in Salaberry-de-Valleyfield; R-132 / R-138 in Châteauguay; A-730 in Saint-Constant; A-15 / A-930 in Candiac; A-10 in Brossard; R-116 / R-112 in Longueuil; A-20 (TCH) in Boucherville
- East end: Boulevard Poliquin in Sorel-Tracy

Bécancour section
- Length: 20.5 km (12.7 mi)
- West end: R-132 in Bécancour
- Major intersections: A-55 in Bécancour
- East end: R-132 in Bécancour

Location
- Country: Canada
- Province: Quebec
- Major cities: Longueuil, Brossard, Châteauguay, Salaberry-de-Valleyfield, Boucherville

Highway system
- Quebec provincial highways; Autoroutes; List; Former
← A-25	→ A-31

Autoroute 30 (A-30), or the Autoroute de l'Acier (In English, Steel Freeway) is an Autoroute in Quebec, Canada. Construction of the A-30 dates back to the early days of autoroute construction in the 1960s. Originally called Highway 3, the A-30 was designed to replace Route 132 as the main artery linking the communities along the South Shore of the St. Lawrence River. The A-30 was originally intended to begin at the U.S. border near Dundee and end at Saint-Pierre-les-Becquets (in Centre-du-Québec). In the late 1970s an eight-year moratorium on new autoroute construction in favour of public transport by the Parti Québécois prevented implementation of that plan.

The original section of Autoroute 30 in 1968 linked Sorel-Tracy to Route 116, which was then called Highway 9. The A-30 was extended to an interchange with Autoroute 10 in Brossard by 1985 and to Autoroute 15 in Candiac by 1996.

Growing road congestion in and around Montreal led to the announcement in 2006 of a federal-provincial partnership to complete A-30 as southwestern bypass ring road. At that time, the section from Châteauguay to Vaudreuil-Dorion was to be tolled, however by 2009 it was decided to collect tolls only on the St. Lawrence bridge. A-30 was extended north of the St. Lawrence River (over a new crossing) to a realigned interchange with Autoroute 20 and Autoroute 540 in Vaudreuil-Dorion, afterward A-540 was annexed and renamed as an extension of A-30. As construction progressed, short sections of the original A-30 that are bypassed by the new route were converted to spur routes and assigned new route numbers; for instance the old alignment of A-30 south of Salaberry-de-Valleyfield was renamed Autoroute 530. Opened to traffic on December 15, 2012, the realigned Autoroute 30 permits motorists travelling the Quebec City–Windsor Corridor (eg Toronto to Quebec City) to bypass the segment of Autoroute 20 that runs towards into Montreal, including the section of A-20 with at-grade intersections in Vaudreuil-Dorion and L'Île-Perrot, as well as the congested stretch of A-20 that includes the Turcot Interchange and Samuel-De Champlain Bridge.

== Description ==
There are two discontinuous sections of A-30:

=== Montérégie ===
The main 143 km (89 mi) segment extends from Autoroute 40 in Vaudreuil-Dorion to Route 133 in Sorel-Tracy.

From the junction of Autoroute 20 in Vaudreuil-Dorion to Route 138 in Châteauguay a completely new freeway was constructed between 2007 and 2012, opening to traffic in December 2012. This new section, built under a Public-Private Partnership, along with the former A-540 west of Vaudreuil make up the first 38 km (24 mi) of the highway now. An approximately 21-kilometre (13 mi) long section bypasses the Mohawk territory of Kahnawake and the South Shore communities of Saint-Constant, Delson, and Candiac. The Kahnawake bypass was built following the 1990 Oka Crisis and extended to the other three communities between 2005 and 2011. The A-30 was originally intended to supplant Route 132, crossing Kahnawake to a junction with the Honoré Mercier Bridge. Local opposition to the proposed route from the late 1960s coupled with the disruption of the Oka Crisis in 1990 prompted the decision to change the course of the new autoroute to bypass the Mohawk territory This new alignment resulted in the 1990 construction, 1992 twinning, then the 2010 redesignation of a 3.2 km (2.0 mi) portion of highway as Autoroute 730. The A-730 now extends from the A-30 mainline in Saint-Constant to Route 132 in Sainte-Catherine. Another 3.2 km (2.0 mi) section from the existing A-30 to Route 132 in Candiac has been redesignated Autoroute 930 since construction of the Jean-Leman section ended in November 2011. Further west, an 8.3 km (5.2 mi) bypass of Salaberry-de-Valleyfield became Autoroute 530 in 2012 when construction of the A-30 extension was completed.

Northeast of Montreal the autoroute parallels Route 132, bypassing the steelmaking centres of Contrecoeur and Sorel-Tracy.

=== Centre-du-Québec ===
An 18.3 km super two segment in Bécancour, from Route 132 immediately west to an interchange with Autoroute 55 (near Laviolette Bridge, south of Trois-Rivières). The A-30 parallels the St. Lawrence River, bypassing the communities of Sainte-Angèle-de-Laval and Des Ormeaux and linking the Port of Bécancour to the autoroute network. Multiplexed with Route 132, the A-30 continues as a two-lane road for a short distance further before ending at the western approach to Gentilly. The road continues on as Route 132. Plans were proposed to connect this part to the main section, but it never happened.

== Exit list ==
RCM	Location	km	mi	Old exit	New exit	Destinations	Notes
Vaudreuil-Soulanges	Vaudreuil-Dorion	0.0	0.0	4	1	A-40 (TCH) to Highway 417 – Montréal, Ottawa/Gatineau, Mirabel Airport	A-30 western terminus; A-40 exit 32
Vaudreuil-Soulanges	Vaudreuil-Dorion	1.6	0.99	3	2	R-340 (Boulevard de la Cité-des-Jeunes)	
Vaudreuil-Soulanges	Vaudreuil-Dorion	3.4	2.1	2	4	R-342 (Route Harwood)	
Vaudreuil-Soulanges	Vaudreuil-Dorion	4.9	3.0	1	5	A-20 to Highway 401 – Rivière-Beaudette, Toronto, Montréal, P.E. Trudeau Airport	A-20 exit 29
Vaudreuil-Soulanges	Les Cèdres	8.6	5.3		9	R-338 – Les Cèdres, Pointe-des-Cascades	
Vaudreuil-Soulanges	Les Cèdres	8.6– 8.7	5.3– 5.4	Tunnel under Soulanges Canal			
Vaudreuil-Soulanges	Les Cèdres	9.2	5.7	Toll booth			
St. Lawrence River		9.6– 11.5	6.0– 7.1	Serge Marcil Bridge			
Beauharnois-Salaberry	Salaberry-de-Valleyfield	13.0	8.1		13	A-530 west – Salaberry-de-Valleyfield	A-530 exit 12
Beauharnois-Salaberry	Beauharnois	16.5	10.3		17	Chemin du Canal	
Beauharnois Canal		19.1– 20.4	11.9– 12.7	Madeleine Parent Bridge			
Beauharnois-Salaberry	Beauharnois	22.0	13.7		22	R-236 (Chemin Saint-Louis) – Saint-Étienne-de-Beauharnois	
Beauharnois-Salaberry	Beauharnois	25.8	16.0		26	R-205 (Chemin de la Beauce) – Sainte-Martine	
Roussillon	Châteauguay	34.8	21.6		35	Chemin de la Haute-Rivière / Boulevard René-Lévesque	
Roussillon	Mercier	37.2	23.1	80	38	R-132 (Saint-Jean-Baptiste boulevard) / R-138 – Downtown Châteauguay, Huntingdon, Salaberry-de-Valleyfield	
Roussillon	Saint-Isidore	40.6	25.2	83	41	Industriel boulevard / Sainte-Marguerite boulevard	
Roussillon	Saint-Constant	43.9	27.3	86	44	R-207 / R-221 – Kahnawake, Saint-Rémi, Saint-Isidore	
Roussillon	Saint-Constant	46.4	28.8	89	47	A-730 north – Saint-Constant, Sainte-Catherine, Honoré-Mercier bridge	A-730 exit 1
Roussillon	Delson–Candiac boundary	54.2	33.7		55	A-15 / R-132 to I-87 – Montréal, New York	Eastbound exit and westbound entrance; A-15 exit 40
Roussillon	Candiac	58.1	36.1		58	A-930 west to A-15 / R-132 / I-87 – Saint-Constant, Sainte-Catherine	Westbound exit and eastbound entrance; A-15 exit 42
Roussillon	La Prairie	62.3	38.7	104	62	R-104 – La Prairie, Saint-Jean-sur-Richelieu	
Roussillon–Longueuil boundary	La Prairie–Brossard boundary	64.4	40.0	107	65	Boulevard Matte, Boulevard de Rome	
Longueuil	Brossard	67.3	41.8	109	67	A-10 / Boulevard de Rome – Montréal, Sherbrooke	A-10 exit 11
Longueuil	Brossard–Longueuil boundary	69.2	43.0	110	69	Grande-Allée	
Longueuil	Longueuil	73.2	45.5	115	73	R-112 (Boulevard Cousineau, Chemin de Chambly)	
Longueuil	Saint-Bruno-de-Montarville	76.0	47.2	118	76	R-116 / Boulevard des Promenades – Belœil, Jacques-Cartier bridge	R-116 exit 9
Longueuil	Saint-Bruno-de-Montarville	77.8	48.3	120	78	Clairevue boulevard – Saint-Bruno-de-Montarville Centre-Ville	Access to Saint-Hubert Airport
Longueuil	Saint-Bruno-de-Montarville–Boucherville boundary	79.8	49.6	121	80	Montée Montarville	
Longueuil	Boucherville	83.5	51.9	125	83	A-20 (TCH) – Montréal, Quebec City	A-20 exit 98
Marguerite-D'Youville	Sainte-Julie	87.0	54.1	128	87	Varennes, Sainte-Julie, Saint-Amable	
Marguerite-D'Youville	Sainte-Julie	88.9	55.2		89	R-229 – Varennes	Eastbound exit and westbound entrance
Marguerite-D'Youville	Varennes	94.7	58.8	136	95	Montée de Picardie	
Marguerite-D'Youville	Varennes	98.2	61.0	141	98	Montée de la Baronnie, Chemin de la Butte-aux-Renards	
Marguerite-D'Youville	Verchères	104.9	65.2	147	105	Verchères	
Marguerite-D'Youville	Verchères	107.1	66.5	149	107	Calixa-Lavallée	
Marguerite-D'Youville	Contrecoeur	112.4	69.8	154	113	Montée Lapierre	
Marguerite-D'Youville	Contrecoeur	116.9	72.6	158	117	Montée de la Pomme-d'Or	
Marguerite-D'Youville	Contrecoeur	118.8	73.8	160	119	Rue Saint-Antoine	
Pierre-De Saurel	Saint-Roch-de-Richelieu	126.1	78.4	168	126	Montée Saint-Roch	
Pierre-De Saurel	Sorel-Tracy	135.1	83.9	178	135	Chemin du Golf	
Pierre-De Saurel	Sorel-Tracy	138.9	86.3	181	138	Boulevard de Tracy / Boulevard des Érables	
Pierre-De Saurel	Sorel-Tracy	140.0	87.0	182	140	Boulevard Saint-Louis	
Pierre-De Saurel	Sorel-Tracy	141.0	87.6	184	141	R-223 (Chemin Saint-Roch)	
Pierre-De Saurel	Sorel-Tracy	142.5	88.5		143	R-133 (Chemin des Patriotes / Boulevard Gagné)	At-grade intersection
Pierre-De Saurel	Sorel-Tracy	143.4	89.1		–	Rue De Ramezay	At-grade intersection
Pierre-De Saurel	Sorel-Tracy	143.9	89.4		–	To R-132 east / Boulevard Poliquin – Nicolet	A-30 eastern terminus (main section)
70 km (45 mi) gap in A-30
Bécancour	Bécancour	0.0	0.0	208	–	R-132 – Saint-Grégoire	A-30 western terminus (Bécancour section)
Bécancour	Bécancour	0.7	0.43	209	–	A-55 – Drummondville, Trois-Rivières	A-55 exit 176
Bécancour	Bécancour	5.2	3.2			Avenue des Jasmins – Sainte-Angèle-de-Laval	At-grade intersection
Bécancour	Bécancour	8.0	5.0			Rue des Glaïeuls	At-grade intersection
Bécancour	Bécancour	8.8	5.5			Rue des Glaïeuls / Boulevard du Danube – Wôlinak, Précieux-Sang	At-grade intersection
Bécancour	Bécancour	10.6	6.6			R-132 west – Bécancour	At-grade intersection; west end of R-132 concurrency
Bécancour	Bécancour	14.1	8.8			R-261 south / Boulevard Arthur-Sicard – Sainte-Gertrude	At-grade intersection
Bécancour	Bécancour	16.5	10.3			Boulevard Alphonse-Deshaies R-132 east – Québec	At-grade intersection; A-30 eastern terminus (Bécancour section); east end of R-132 concurrency; R-132 continues east
1.000 mi = 1.609 km; 1.000 km = 0.621 mi: Concurrency terminus; Electronic toll collection; Incomplete access

== Extension of Autoroute 30 (Montreal Bypass Project) ==
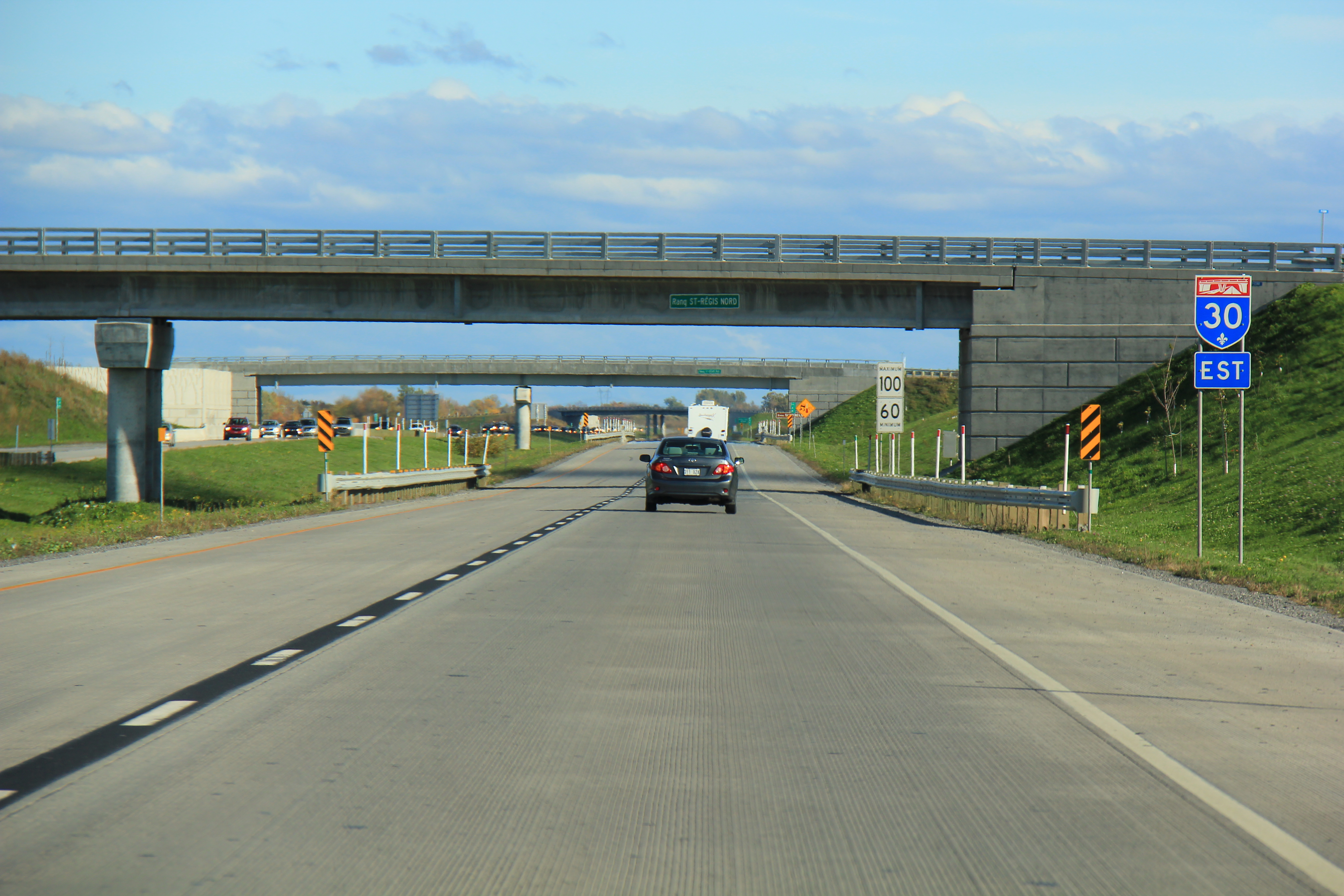
Eastbound A-30 in Saint-Constant

The completion of Autoroute 30 as a southern bypass was intended to better integrate greater Montreal's network of autoroutes, significantly reduce transit time to and through the region, boost economic activity in Montérégie, and improve access to markets in Ontario (via Ontario highways 401 and 417) and the United States (via Interstates 87 and 89). This new section was completed on December 15, 2012. The westernmost section was financed through a public–private partnership, in which the government contracted with Acciona (a Spanish engineering and construction company) to design, construct, operate, maintain, and finance the autoroute. The eastern section of the A-30 extension was publicly funded.

=== Candiac–Châteauguay ===
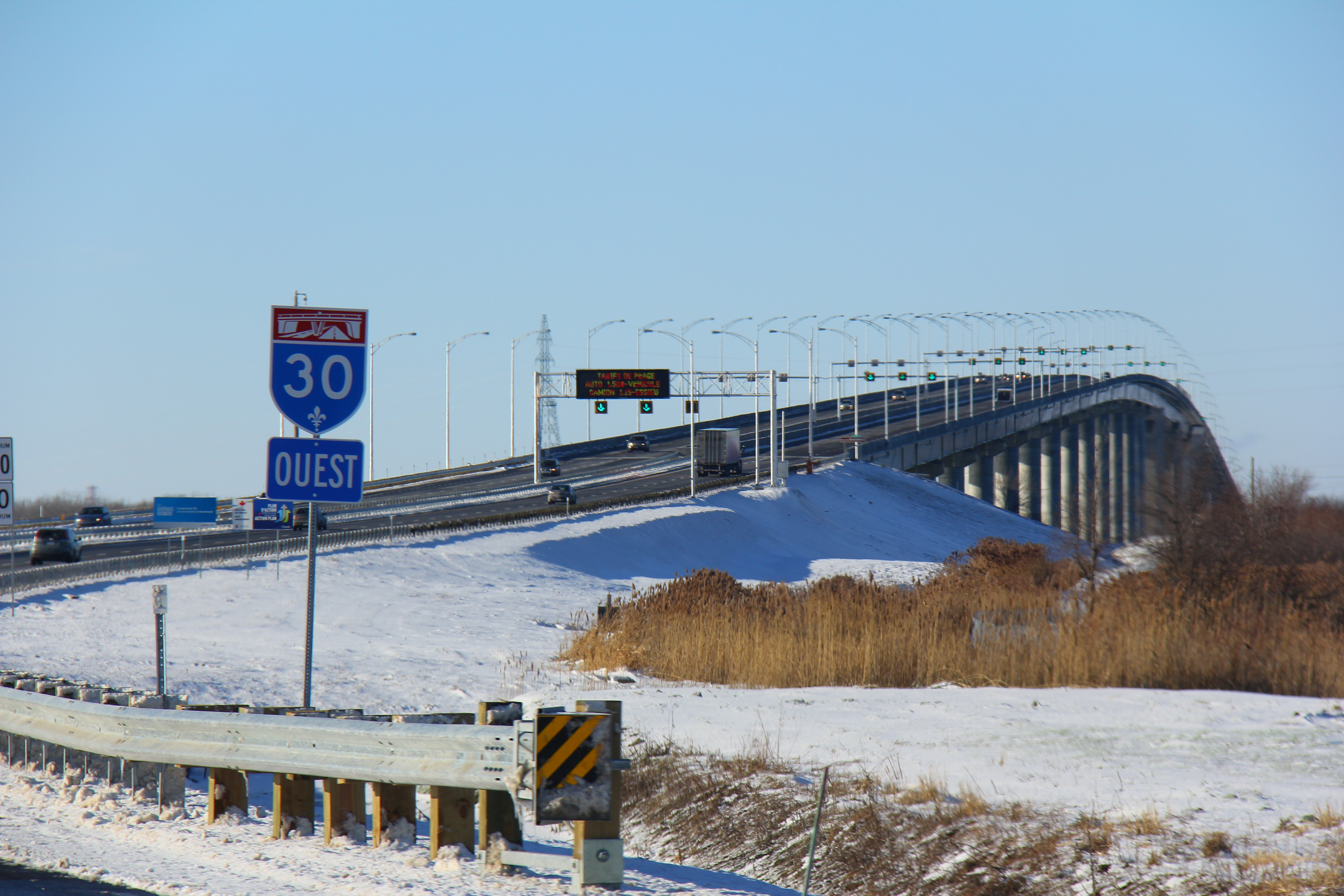
A-30 bridge across the Beauharnois Canal

Construction of this portion of the A-30—from an interchange with the A-15 (and the spur A-930) in Candiac to Châteauguay—began in 2005 and opened to traffic on November 19, 2010. This section was linked to the A-30 mainline in November 2011. Motorists using A-30 can quickly access New York via the A-15 and Interstate 87.

=== Châteauguay – Vaudreuil-Dorion ===
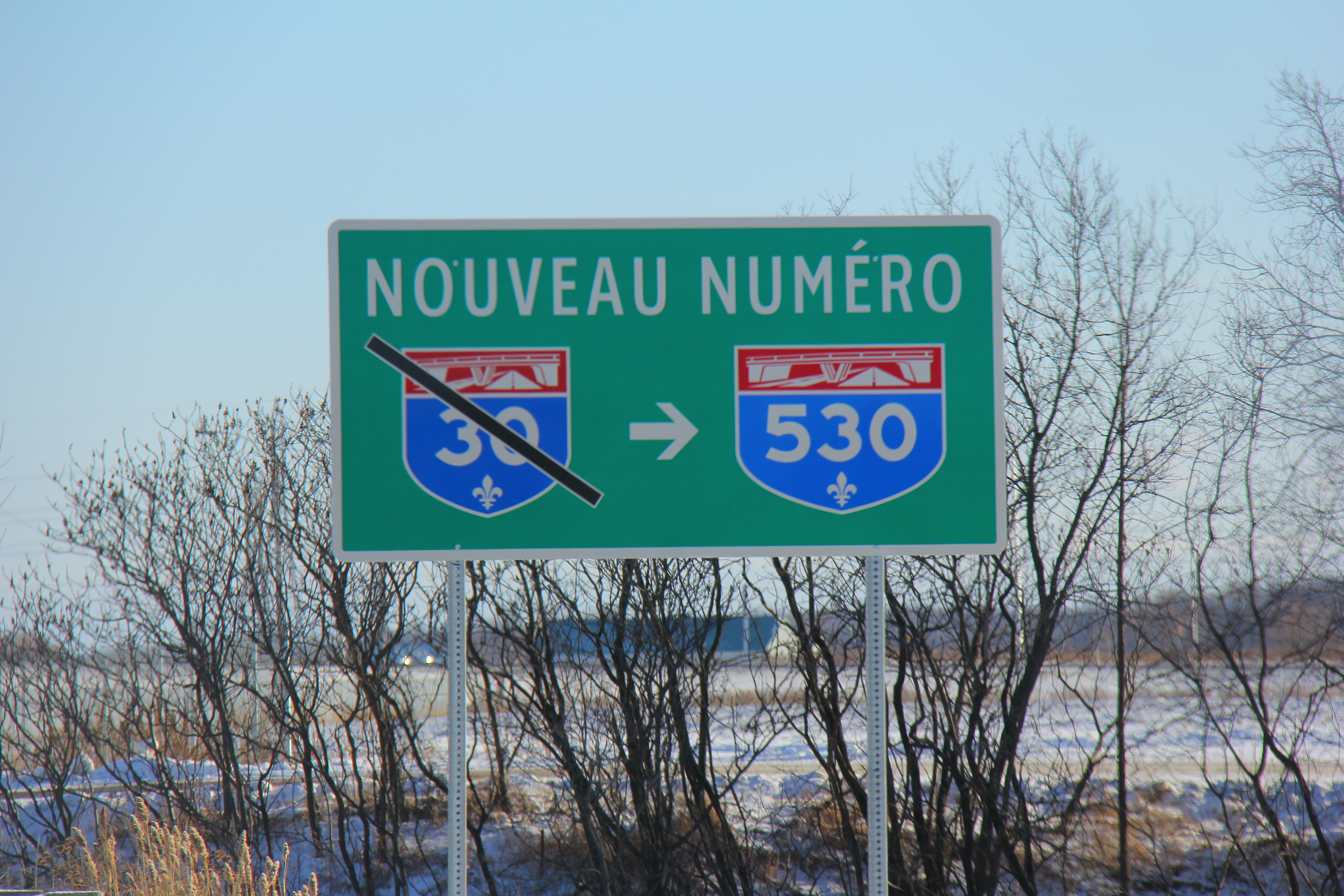
Signage for A-530

A new 35 km (21.7 mi) four-lane divided highway has been constructed, and opened to traffic on December 15, 2012. The A-30 crosses the St. Lawrence River to a redesigned interchange with A-20 and the former A-540. The new river crossing expedites the region's access to Toronto via A-20 and Ontario Highway 401.

A-540, a short spur road connecting A-20 with A-40, was re-designated A-30 once construction was complete. Thus, A-30's ultimate western terminus is at the junction with A-40, providing access to Ottawa and eastern Ontario via Ontario Highway 417.

=== Salaberry-de-Valleyfield ===
The re-routing of A-30 across the St. Lawrence River resulted in the re-designation of a 7 km (4.3 mi) long section of the original route as A-530. This spur route links the re-aligned A-30 mainline with Salaberry-de-Valleyfield. A-530 features two interchanges, one at boulevard Pie XII and the other at Route 201.
