= Candiac, Quebec =

Candiac
- City
- Ville de Candiac
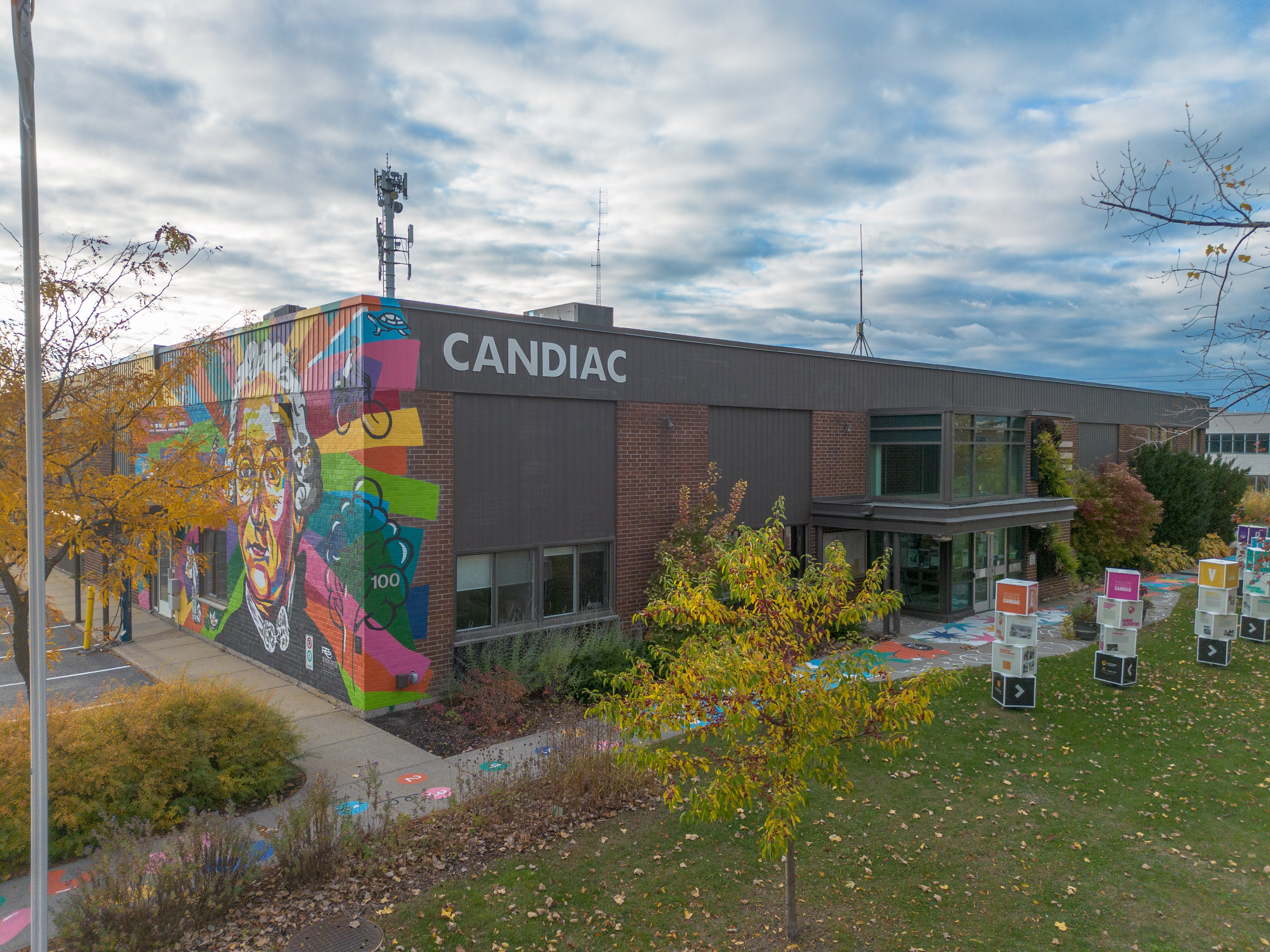
- Candiac town hall in 2025

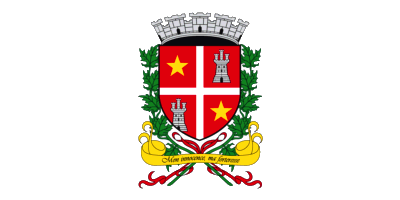
- Flag Seal Coat of arms
- Motto: Mon innocence, ma forteresse (French for "My innocence, my fortress")
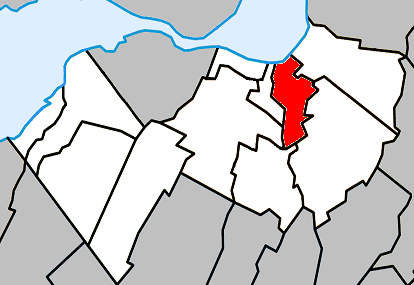
- Location within Roussillon RCM

- Location in southern Quebec
- Coordinates: 45.38°N 73.52°W
- Country: Canada
- Province: Quebec
- Region: Montérégie
- RCM: Roussillon
- Constituted: January 31, 1957

Government
  - Mayor: Normand Dyotte
  - Federal riding: La Prairie
  - Prov. riding: La Prairie

Area
  - Total: 18.70 km^{2} (7.22 sq mi)
  - Land: 17.27 km^{2} (6.67 sq mi)

Population (2021)
  - Total: 22,997
  - Density: 1,331.3/km^{2} (3,448/sq mi)
  - Pop 2016-2021: ▲9.3%
  - Dwellings: 8,960
- Time zone: UTC−5 (EST)
  - Summer (DST): UTC−4 (EDT)
- Postal code(s): J5R
- Area codes: 450 and 579
- Highways A-15 A-30 A-930: R-132; R-134
- Website: candiac.ca

Candiac (French pronunciation: [kɑ̃djak]) is a suburb of Montreal, in the Canadian province of Quebec; it is located on the South Shore of the Saint Lawrence River opposite Montreal near La Prairie. The population as of the Canada 2021 Census was 22,997.

== History ==
Candiac was created January 31, 1957, when the government of Quebec accepted the request of a Canadian-European investors group, the Candiac Development Corporation. The investors had collected over $4.5 million and bought 2,500 acres (10 km²) of former farmland, mostly from local farmers.

In its early days, Candiac was home to 320 people who mostly lived near the St. Lawrence River. Most of the inhabitants were either farmers or Montrealers who owned a second residence in Candiac.

Candiac was named after the birthplace of Louis-Joseph de Montcalm, who was born in 1712 at Château de Candiac in Vestric-et-Candiac, near Nîmes, in France. Montcalm was mortally wounded at the Battle of the Plains of Abraham and died the following day in Quebec City while fighting for France during the Seven Years' War in 1759.

=== Coat of arms ===
Montcalm's heritage and the first mayor, Jean Leman, family's coat of arms were the inspiration for Candiac's coat of arms. The colour red symbolizes charity and justice, two very important values. It is also present in the Leman's coat of arms and is said to honour Montcalm's legacy. The silver cross is a typical French-Canadian symbol that reminds citizens of their French heritage. The stars were taken from the Leman's coat of arms and the towers from Montcalm's. The crown symbolizes the Château de Candiac and the maple leaves symbolize Canada.

The floral emblem of Candiac is the Campanula carpatica, better known as White Clips.

== Demographics ==
Historical Census Data - Candiac, Quebec
Year	Pop.	±%
1961	1,050	—
1966	3,178	+202.7%
1971	5,185	+63.2%
1976	7,166	+38.2%
1981	8,502	+18.6%
1986	9,096	+7.0%
1991	10,765	+18.3%
1996	11,805	+9.7%
2001	12,675	+7.4%
2006	15,947	+25.8%
2011	19,876	+24.6%
2016	21,047	+5.9%
2021	22,997	+9.3%

In the 2021 Census of Population conducted by Statistics Canada, Candiac had a population of 22,997 living in 8,731 of its 8,960 total private dwellings, a change of 9.3% from its 2016 population of 21,047. With a land area of 17.27 km^{2} (6.67 sq mi), it had a population density of 1,331.6/km^{2} (3,448.9/sq mi) in 2021.

Canada census – Candiac community profile

	2021	2016	2011
Population	22,997 (+9.3% from 2016)	21,047 (+5.9% from 2011)	19,876 (+24.6% from 2006)
Land area	17.27 km^{2} (6.67 sq mi)	17.31 km^{2} (6.68 sq mi)	17.59 km^{2} (6.79 sq mi)
Population density	1,331.3/km^{2} (3,448/sq mi)	1,215.8/km^{2} (3,149/sq mi)	1,129.8/km^{2} (2,926/sq mi)
Median age	42.0 (M: 41.2, F: 42.4)	39.3 (M: 39.0, F: 39.6)	37.3 (M: 36.8, F: 37.8)
Private dwellings	8,960 (total) 8,731 (occupied)	7,925 (total)	7,580 (total)
Median household income	$111,000	$82,401	$91,196

References: 2021 2016 2011

Canada Census Mother Tongue - Candiac, Quebec
Census	Total	French			English			French & English			Other		
Year	Responses	Count	Trend	Pop %	Count	Trend	Pop %	Count	Trend	Pop %	Count	Trend	Pop %
2021	22,550	15,680	▼3.2%	69.5%	2,130	▼6.6%	9.4%	560	▲60.0%	2.5%	3,685	▲61.6%	16.3%
2016	21,045	16,200	▲2.3%	77.0%	2,280	▲19.1%	10.8%	350	▲14.8%	1.7%	2,280	▲37.8%	10.8%
2011	19,705	15,830	▲21.6%	80.3%	1,915	▲12.6%	9.7%	305	▲117.9%	1.6%	1,655	▲51.8%	8.4%
2006	15,945	13,015	▲28.9%	81.6%	1,700	▲8.6%	10.7%	140	▼20.0%	0.9%	1,090	▲31.3%	6.8%
2001	12,670	10,100	▲5.6%	79.7%	1,565	▲14.7%	12.4%	175	▲25.0%	1.4%	830	▲27.7%	6.6%
1996	11,720	9,565	n/a	81.6%	1,365	n/a	11.7%	140	n/a	1.2%	650	n/a	5.6%

== Infrastructure ==
=== Transportation ===
The Exo Le Richelain sector provides commuter and local bus services. Commuter trains provided by Exo link Candiac to Lucien-L'Allier station in downtown Montréal.

=== Municipal Buildings ===
The City of Candiac has four (4) main municipal buildings: the Hotel de Ville (city hall), Centre Roméo-V.-Patenaude (renovated in 2005), Centre Frank-Vocino (the old library, now the Ideal Club meeting area), and Centre Claude-Hébert (the new restored library).

== Education ==
The South Shore Protestant Regional School Board previously served the municipality.

== See also ==
- Brossard—La Prairie
- La Prairie (provincial electoral district)
- List of anglophone communities in Quebec
- List of cities in Quebec
- Rivière de la Tortue (Delson)
- Roussillon Regional County Municipality, Quebec
