= Honoré-Mercier Bridge =

Bridge in Quebec

Honoré Mercier Bridge
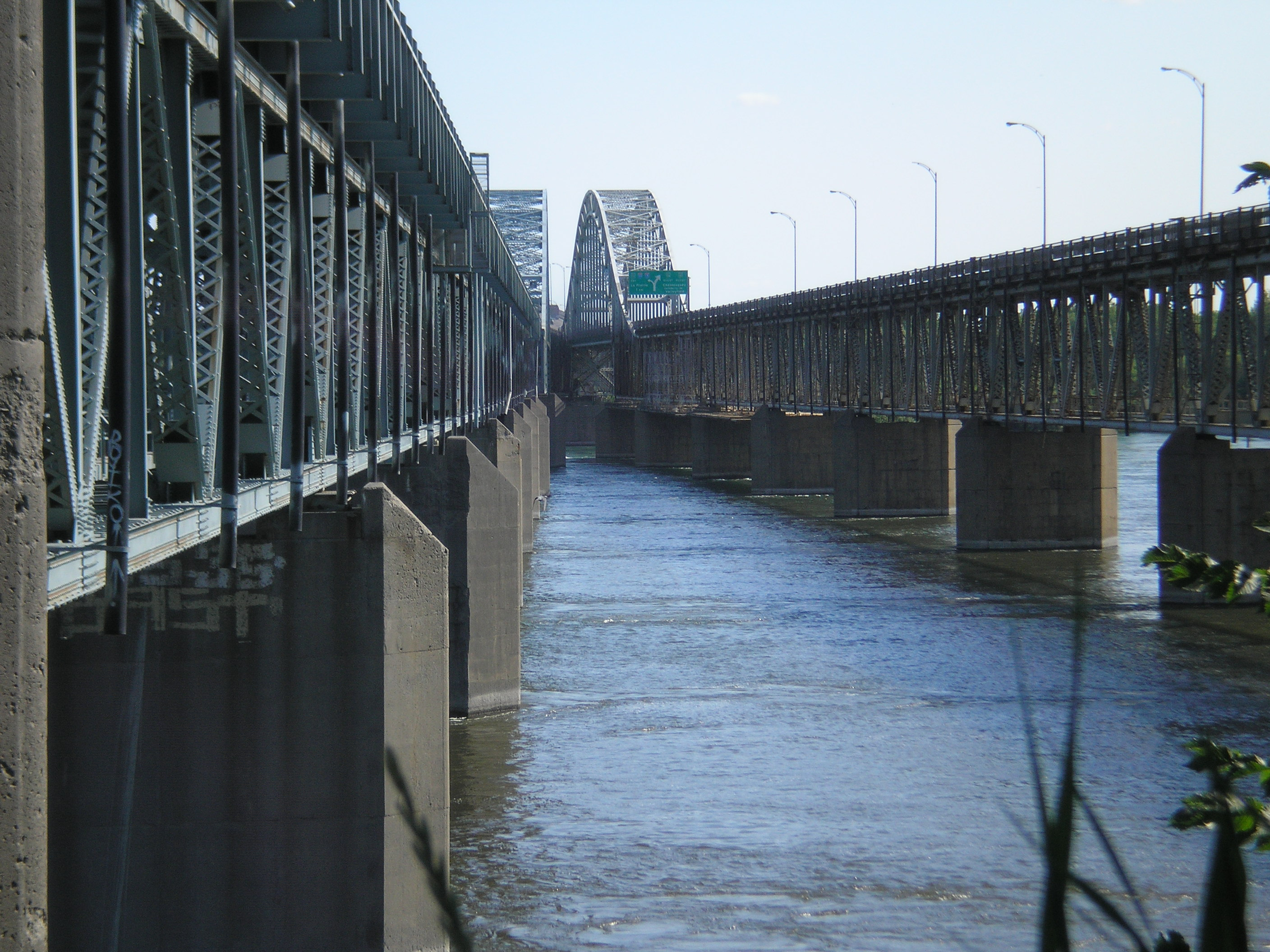
- The twin spans of the Mercier Bridge as seen from Lasalle in 2008.
- Coordinates: 45°25′01″N 73°39′18″W
- Carries: R-138
- Crosses: St. Lawrence River and Saint Lawrence Seaway
- Locale: Kahnawake and Montreal, Quebec
- Official name: Pont Honoré-Mercier

Characteristics
- Design: Twin through arch bridges
- Total length: 1.361 km (0.846 mi)
- Height: Varies from 12.44 to 33.38 m (40.8 to 109.5 ft)
- No. of lanes: 4 (2 per span)

History
- Constructed by: Dominion Bridge Company
- Opened: 1934 (twinned in 1963)

Statistics
- Daily traffic: 67,000
- Toll: 0.25$ (abolished in 1963)

Location
- Interactive map of Honoré Mercier Bridge

The Honoré Mercier Bridge (French Pont Honoré-Mercier) in Quebec, Canada, connects the Montreal borough of LaSalle on the Island of Montreal with the Mohawk reserve of Kahnawake on the south shore of the Saint Lawrence River. It is the most direct southerly route from the island of Montreal toward the US border. It carries Route 138, originally Route 4. It is 1.361 km (0.846 mi) in length and contains four steel trusses on its first section. The height of the bridge varies from 12.44 m (40.8 ft) to 33.38 m (109.5 ft) with the highest sections located over the St. Lawrence Seaway. The bridge is named after former premier of Quebec Honoré Mercier.

Unique in Quebec, the bridge is managed by both the federal and provincial governments. The southwest portion of the bridge, over 1,031 metres (1128 yards) from the beginning of the arch bridge (at pier 14), is the responsibility of a Crown corporation: the Jacques Cartier and Champlain Bridges Incorporated (JCCBI). The rest of the bridge (902 metres, 986 yards) is owned by the Quebec Ministry of Transport, which is also responsible for the day-to-day operations of the complex, including the federal part.

The bridge has two lanes for traffic in each direction and a total span of nearly 2 kilometres (1.2 mi). At its highest point, the bridge rises 36 metres (118 ft) above the river. There is a narrow sidewalk on the side headed to Châteauguay that was for use by pedestrians or bicycle, but it has not been open since major repairs began in 2009. The roadway has been characterized by numerous repairs.

It is estimated that an average of 75,000 vehicles use the bridge each day, and an estimated 30 million vehicles every year.

== History ==
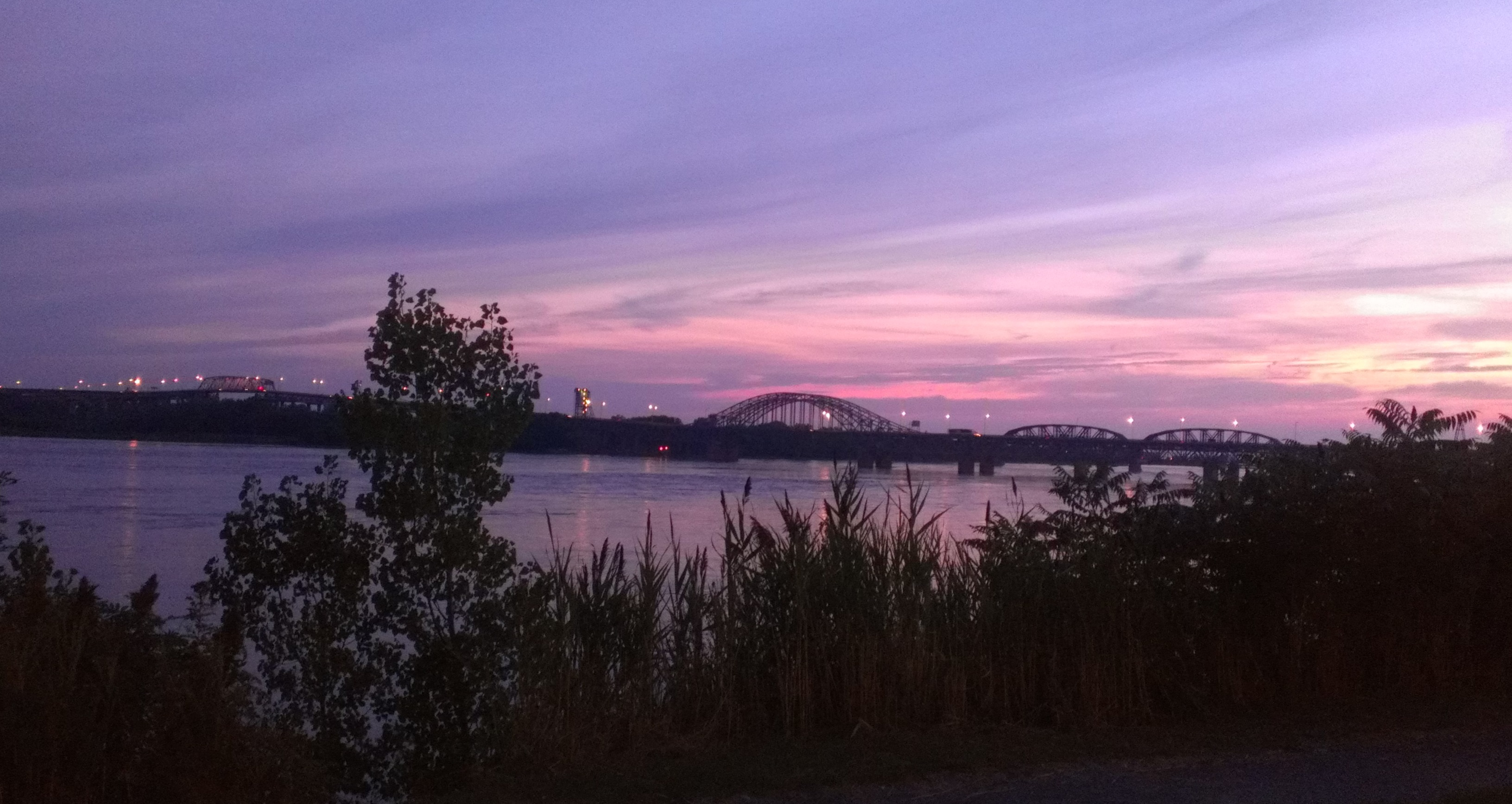
Honoré Mercier bridge at sunset

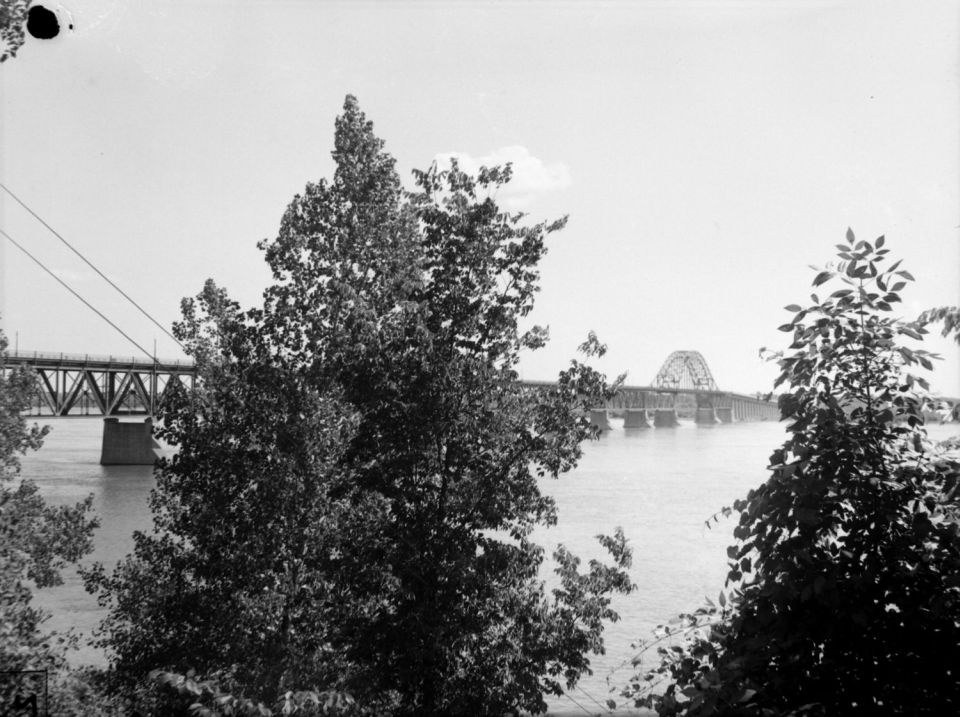
Bridge in 1948

Before the bridge was built there was a ferry service.

The bridge, known in the developmental stage as the "Saint-Louis Bridge" (for the nearby located Lake Saint-Louis and the parish of Saint-Louis-de-Caughnawaga, today part of the Kahnawake reserve), was designed by eleven French-Canadian engineers, all graduates of the École Polytechnique de Montréal, and was built by the Dominion Bridge Company Ltd under a government-funded work program. Construction of the bridge began in November 1932 and was completed in the early summer of 1934. It was opened to traffic on June 22, 1934 (named "Honoré-Mercier" during its inauguration by mayor Taschereau, 10 months ahead of schedule with a toll of 50 cents for an automobile and driver—later reduced to 25 cents. Today there is no toll charged for crossing the bridge.

The original east approach was on Lafleur Avenue, which ran straight into the Gauron Bridge over the Lachine Canal.

The higher section over the Saint Lawrence Seaway was added in the late 1950s. In August 1963, the Quebec Department of Public Works approved the construction of a "second" bridge downstream from the first. This increased the number of lanes from two to four.

=== Oka Crisis ===
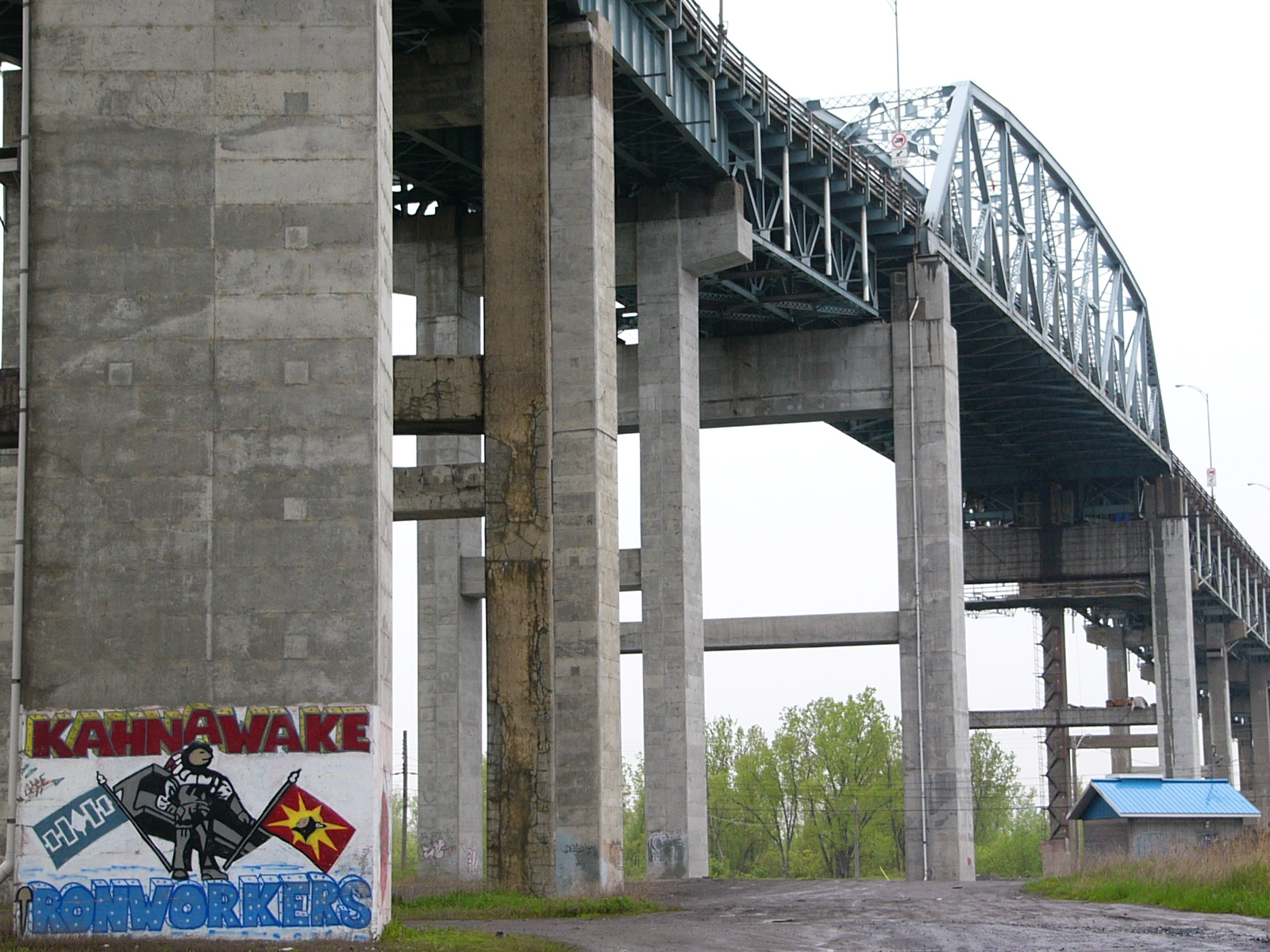
Underneath the Mercier Bridge in Kahnawake.

During the Oka Crisis in July and August 1990, the bridge was closed to all traffic for over a month by Mohawks who supported their brothers from Kanesatake. This closure period led to violent tempers and clashes between Mohawks and people from Châteauguay, and the extension of Autoroute 30 bypassing the Kahnawake reserve. As a compensatory measure, the Champlain Bridge Boom was opened to motorists and a temporary rail shuttle was introduced.

=== Mohawks in Support of the Caledonia Group ===
During the Caledonia land dispute, certain individuals from Kahnawake erected Warrior and Confederacy flags on the steel trusses of the bridge to show their support.

The bridge was closed for a short period, in order to allow several men from the community to climb the structure and secure the flags. To ensure their safety, the Kahnawake Peacekeepers stopped traffic from the Kahnawake side of the bridge, while the Quebec Provincial Police blocked access on the Lasalle side. Several weeks later one of the Warrior flags was removed from the bridge and replaced with a Quebec flag (the red Warrior flag is barely visible in the above picture between the first 'V' section of the truss).

On June 29, 2007, community members of Kahnawake staged a peaceful protest on the bridge, in support of the AFN's National Day of Action. Once again men from the community placed Warrior and Confederacy flags on the structure that spans the St. Lawrence Seaway.

== Maintenance ==
The Jacques Cartier and Champlain Bridges Incorporated (JCCBI) (in French: Ponts Jacques Cartier et Champlain Incorporée, PJCCI), a federal Crown corporation, is responsible for managing, operating and maintaining the Mercier Bridge where it crosses the Mohawk Reserve of Kahnawake. This comprises the ramps leading to the bridge on the south shore ("Ramps" Sector), the span over the St. Lawrence Seaway ("Seaway" Sector), and the stretch above "Ile Maline" ("B1 Island" Sector). The Ministry of Transport of Quebec (MTQ) is responsible for the bridge where it crosses the St. Lawrence River ("B2" Sector).

=== Rehabilitation Project ===
2009 saw the start of a complete rehabilitation of the bridge, the largest ever undertaken in Canada. For the first time since 1934, the deck of the Mercier Bridge was partially replaced. The work is expected to prolong the bridge's life for another 75 years. The bridge deck was replaced using prefabricated concrete deck panels. The new deck consists of more than 1,300 prefabricated concrete panels assembled with steel tension cables. In total, the new deck is an area of 40,684 m2 (10 acres). Numerous lane closures and redirection of traffic continued until work was completed. The project has been carried out in two parts: Phase A, replacement of the deck in the Ramps Section and Phase B, replacement of the deck in the B1, Seaway, and Mixed Sections. Phase A was handled by Kahnawake's Mohawk Bridge Consortium. Phase B was originally to be done by Pomerleau-de Mathieu Bard, but problems led to the removal of the contractor. The works were then completed by the Mohawk Bridge Consortium. The eight-year work on the federal part, led by contractor, Mohawk Bridge Consortium, was completed by the end of August 2016. A total of 982 new concrete panels were installed at a cost of $200 million.

=== Emergency closure ===
The Quebec Ministry of Transport (MTQ) initially planned to renovate the section of the bridge under its jurisdiction at the same time and in the same manner as the federal section. On June 14, 2011, due to the extreme deterioration of 10 gusset plates, the 1930s section of the Mercier bridge was closed until September 6 (in time for school restart). Engineers examined each gusset and designed an individual solution of either replacement or reinforcement aimed as a permanent solution, not a patch. Regular inspections found the gussets to be corroded beyond what was expected. Using all known weaknesses of the bridge structure, the engineers undertook a complete recalculation of the load bearing ability of the structure. Once they calculated that and factored in a margin for safety, they decided to close the bridge at 8:04 PM on June 14, 2011. The reinforcement of existing structures was staggered until 2013. In 2014, an in-depth study was commissioned to a consortium of BPR, Genivar and SNC-Lavalin firms to determine the optimal solution for the future of the section. Provincial Bridge: Major Rehabilitation or Reconstruction.

In April 2017, the Quebec government announced the construction of a new section towards the South Shore of Montreal. The date of the beginning of the work is not determined.

On October 13, 2026, the left inbound lane toward Montreal was indefinitely closed after a small crack was found under the bridge structure. As of result, tolls on the Freeway 30 bridge towards west will be suspended from 5:30 to 9:30 AM. On October 19, the closed lane was reopened after repairs were done during the last few days, and the Freeway 30 bridge tolls were re-established.

== See also ==
- List of crossings of the Saint Lawrence River
- List of bridges in Canada
- List of bridges in Montreal
