= Quebec Route 139 =

Highway in Quebec, Canada

Route 139

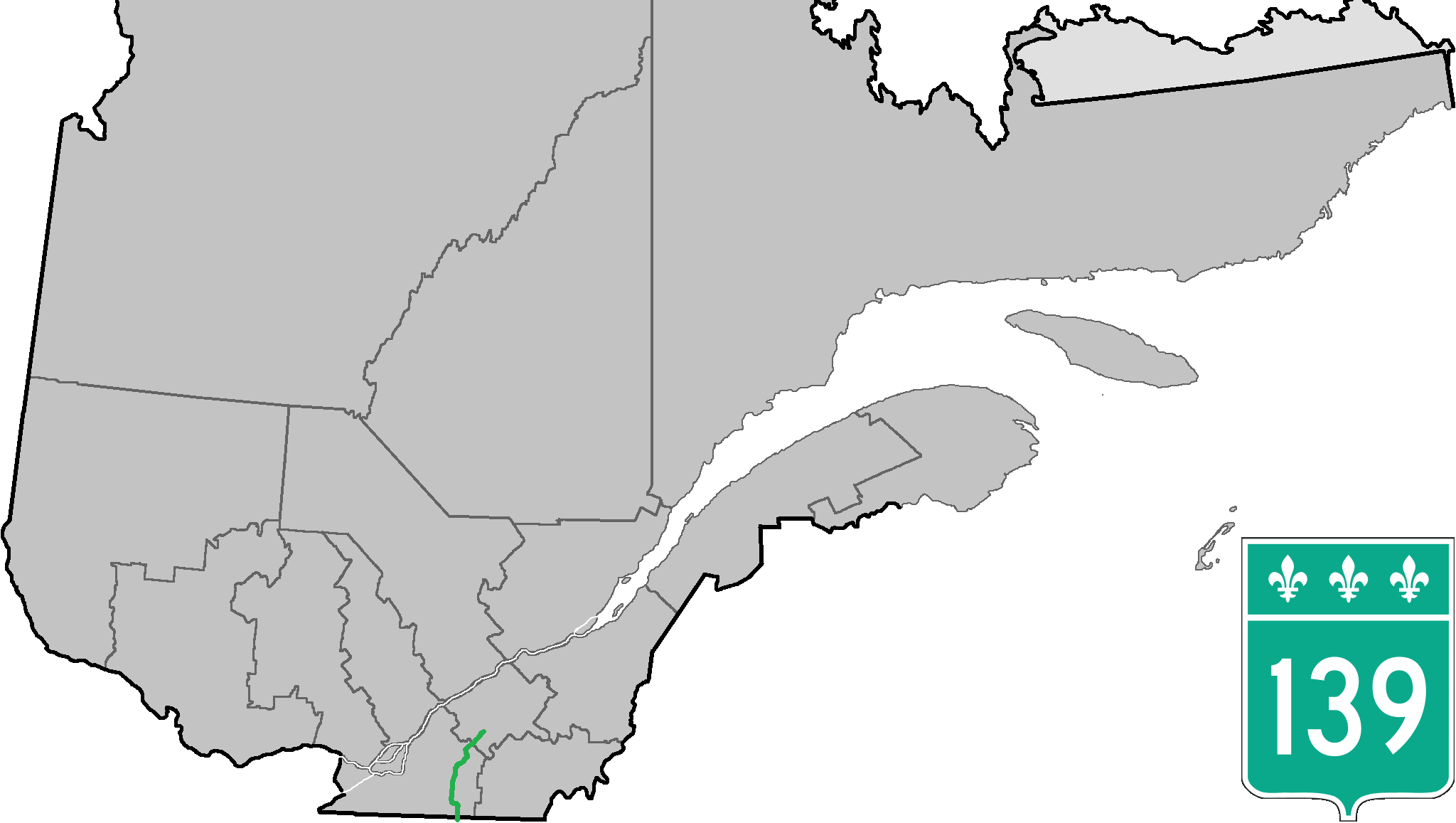

Route information
- Maintained by Transports Québec
- Length: 124.1 km (77.1 mi)

Major junctions
- South end: VT 139 at the U.S. border in Abercorn
- R-215 in Sutton; R-104 / R-202 / R-241 in Cowansville; A-10 in Saint-Alphonse-de-Granby; R-112 in Granby; R-222 / R-241 in Roxton Falls; R-116 in Acton Vale; A-55 in Drummondville
- North end: R-143 in Drummondville

Location
- Country: Canada
- Province: Quebec
- Major cities: Cowansville, Granby, Drummondville

Highway system
- Quebec provincial highways; Autoroutes; List; Former
| ← R-138 | → R-141 |

Route 139 is a north/south highway on the south shore of the Saint Lawrence River. Its northern terminus is in Drummondville, at the junction of Route 143, and the southern terminus is in Abercorn at the border with Richford, Vermont at the Richford–Abercorn Border Crossing.

== Municipalities along Route 139 ==
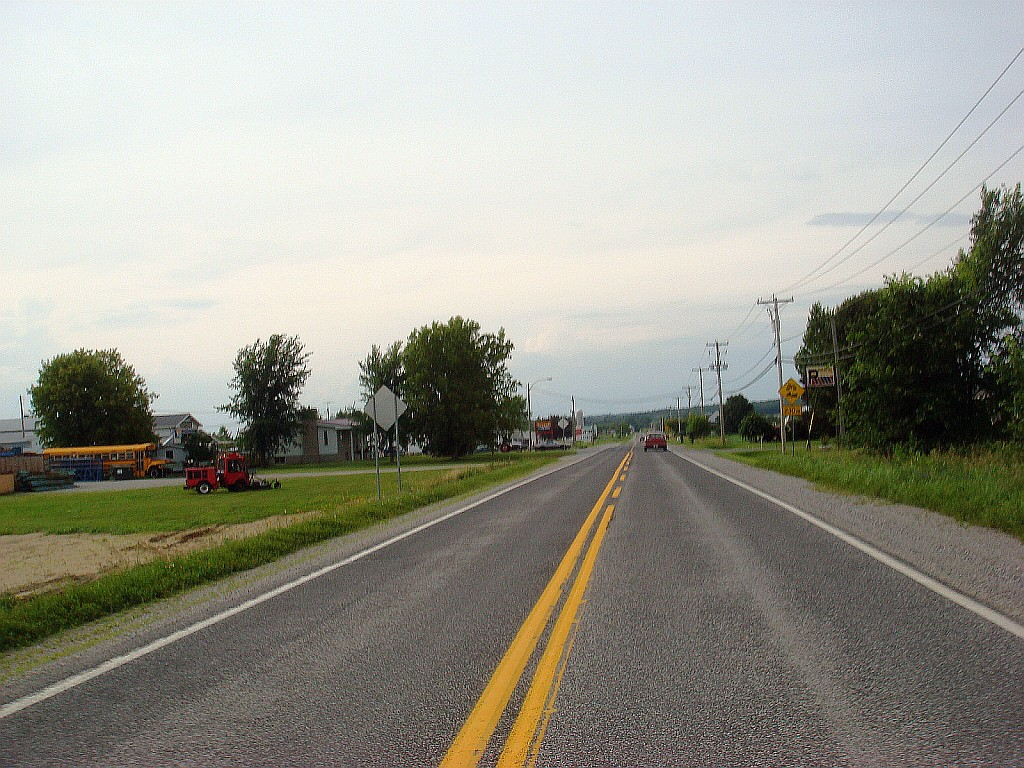
Quebec Route 139 at Acton Vale

- Abercorn
- Sutton
- Brome Lake
- Cowansville
- East Farnham
- Brigham
- Bromont
- Saint-Alphonse-de-Granby
- Granby
- Roxton Pond
- Roxton
- Roxton Falls
- Acton Vale
- Saint-Théodore-d'Acton
- Wickham
- Drummondville

== Major intersections ==
| RCM or ET | Municipality | Km | Junction | Notes |
|---|---|---|---|---|
Southern terminus of Route 139
| Brome-Missisquoi | Abercorn | 0.0 | VT 139 south | SOUTH: to Richford, Vermont |
| Brome-Missisquoi | Sutton | 11.5 | R-215 (South end) | 215 NORTH: to Brome |
| Brome-Missisquoi | Cowansville | 24.0 | R-104 (Overlap 10.7 km) | 104 EAST: to Brome Lake |
| Brome-Missisquoi | Cowansville | 26.7 | R-241 (South end) | 241 NORTH: to Bromont |
| Brome-Missisquoi | Cowansville | 31.8 | R-202 (East end) | 202 WEST: to Dunham |
| Brome-Missisquoi | Cowansville | 34.7 | R-104 (Overlap 10.7 km) | 104 WEST: to Farnham |
| Brome-Missisquoi | East-Farnham | 40.0 | Avenue-des-Érables | WEST: to Brigham |
| La Haute-Yamaska | Saint-Alphonse-de-Granby | 49.9; 50.3 | A-10 | 10 EAST: to Bromont; 10 WEST: to Ange-Gardien |
| La Haute-Yamaska | Granby | 58.3 | R-112 | 112 WEST: to Saint-Paul-d'Abbotsford; 112 EAST: to Waterloo |
| Acton | Roxton Falls | 88.8 | R-241 (North end) | 241 SOUTH: to Saint-Joachim-de-Shefford |
| Acton | Roxton Falls | 89.4 | R-222 (West end) | 222 EAST: to Sainte-Christine |
| Acton | Acton Vale | 98.3; 99.1 | R-116 (Overlap 0.8 km) | 116 WEST: to Upton; 116 EAST: to Durham-Sud |
| Drummond | Wickham | 114.0 | Rue Blanchard | SOUTH: to Lefebvre |
| Drummond | Drummondville | 122.1; 122.6 | A-55 | 55 SOUTH: to L'Avenir; 55 NORTH: to Drummondville |
| Drummond | Drummondville | 124.1 | R-143 | 143 SOUTH: to L'Avenir; 143 NORTH: to Drummondville |
Northern terminus of Route 139

== See also ==
- List of Quebec provincial highways
