= Vermont Route 139 =

State highway in Franklin County, Vermont, US

Vermont Route 139
- Map of Franklin County in northwestern Vermont with VT 139 highlighted in red

Route information
- Maintained by town of Richford
- Length: 1.822 mi (2.932 km)

Major junctions
- South end: VT 105 in Richford
- North end: R-139 at the Canadian border near Abercorn, QC

Location
- Country: United States
- State: Vermont
- Counties: Franklin

Highway system
- State highways in Vermont
← VT 133	→ VT 140

Vermont Route 139 (VT 139) is a state highway in the U.S. state of Vermont. The highway, which lies within Richford in northern Franklin County, has a length of 1.822 miles (2.932 km) from VT 105 north to the Canada–United States border. VT 139 provides access to the Richford–Abercorn Border Crossing, from which the highway continues as Quebec Route 139.

== Route description ==
VT 139 begins at VT 105 in the unincorporated village of Richford in the town of Richford; VT 105 heads southwest as Main Street and east as Troy Street. VT 139 heads north along Main Street into the Downtown Richford Historic District. The highway crosses the Missisquoi River on a pony truss bridge to a four-way intersection between Main Street, River Street, Town Hill Street, and Province Street; River Street leads to the Pinnacle Road–East Pinnacle Border Crossing. VT 139 turns east onto Province Street, which curves northeast out of the downtown area. The highway has a grade crossing with the Central Maine and Quebec Railway's Newport Subdivision rail line and parallels the rail line to the highway's northern terminus at the Richford–Abercorn Border Crossing at the international border between Vermont and Quebec. The highway continues north from the border crossing as Quebec Route 139 (Chemin des Ormes). which heads toward Abercorn and Cowansville in Brome-Missisquoi Regional County Municipality. The town of Richford maintains the entire length of VT 139.

== Major intersections ==
The entire route is in Richford, Franklin County.

mi	km	Destinations	Notes
0.000	0.000	VT 105 (Main Street/Troy Street) – St. Albans, Troy	Southern terminus
1.822	2.932	R-139 north (Chemin des Ormes) – Abercorn	Northern terminus; Richford–Abercorn Border Crossing at Canada–United States border
1.000 mi = 1.609 km; 1.000 km = 0.621 mi
