= Stanbridge, Quebec =

The name Stanbridge, Quebec could refer to one of the following locations in the Brome-Missisquoi Regional County Municipality, Quebec

Parishes

- Notre-Dame-de-Stanbridge, Quebec
- Saint-Ignace-de-Stanbridge, Quebec

Municipalities

- Stanbridge East, Quebec, known as the township of Stanbridge before 1997
- Stanbridge Station, Quebec
