= Richford (CDP), Vermont =

Census-designated place in Vermont, United States

Richford, Vermont
- Census-designated place
- Location in Franklin County and the state of Vermont
- Coordinates: 44°59′44″N 72°40′06″W
- Country: United States
- State: Vermont
- County: Franklin
- Town: Richford

Area
  - Total: 4.9 sq mi (13 km^{2})
  - Land: 4.8 sq mi (12 km^{2})
  - Water: 0.1 sq mi (0.26 km^{2})
- Elevation: 482 ft (147 m)

Population (2010)
  - Total: 1,361
  - Density: 734/sq mi (283.4/km^{2})
- Time zone: UTC-5 (Eastern (EST))
  - Summer (DST): UTC-4 (EDT)
- ZIP code: 05476
- Area code: 802
- GNIS feature ID: 2378132
- FIPS code: 50-59050

Richford is a census-designated place comprising the main settlement in the town of Richford, Franklin County, Vermont, United States. Its population was 1,361 as of the 2010 census, out of 2,308 people in the entire town of Richford.

== Geography ==
The Richford CDP is located in the northwestern part of the town of Richford, along the Missisquoi River. Vermont Route 105 passes through the community, staying on the south side of the river; it leads east 18 miles (29 km) over the Green Mountains to North Troy and southwest down the Missisquoi River valley 10 miles (16 km) to Enosburg Falls. Vermont Route 139 (Main Street) intersects VT 105 in the southern part of town, crosses the Missisquoi, becomes Province Street, and leads north 1.5 miles (2.4 km) to the Canada–United States border. Quebec Route 139 continues north from the border 7 miles (11 km) to Sutton, Quebec.

According to the United States Census Bureau, the Richford CDP has a total area of 1.9 square miles (4.9 km^{2}), of which 1.9 square miles (4.8 km^{2}) is land and 0.04 square miles (0.1 km^{2}), or 2.05%, is water.
