= Richford–Abercorn Border Crossing =

Canada–United States border crossing

Richford-Abercorn Border Crossing
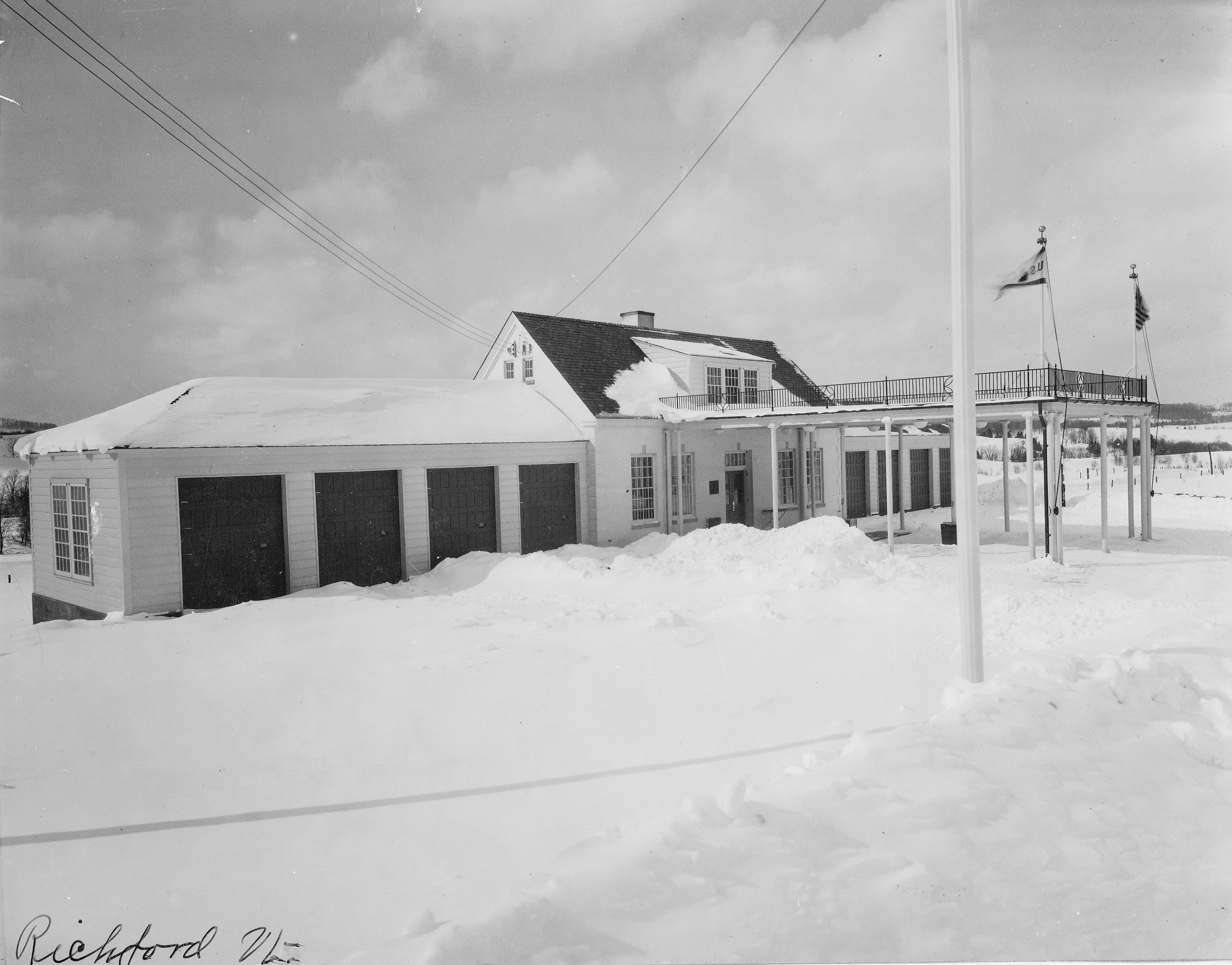
- US Border Inspection Station in Richford, VT as seen in 1936

Location
- Country: United States; Canada
- Location: VT 139 / R-139; US Port: 705 Province Street, Richford, Vermont 05476; Canadian Port: 549 Route 139, Abercorn, Quebec J0E 1B0
- Coordinates: 45.015071°N 72.662539°W

Details
- Opened: 1845

Website
- Official Canadian web site; Offician United States web site
- U.S. Inspection Station-Richford, Vermont
- U.S. National Register of Historic Places
- MPS: U.S. Border Inspection Stations MPS
- NRHP reference No.: 14000605
- Added to NRHP: September 10, 2014

The Richford–Abercorn Border Crossing connects the town of Abercorn, Quebec with the town of Richford, Vermont on the Canada–US border. It is located at the meeting point of Quebec Route 139 and Vermont Route 139, roughly midway between the two village centers. A United States border station has existed here since at least 1926; the present 1935 station was listed on the US National Register of Historic Places in 2014. Both stations are open 24 hours per day, seven days per week.

== Setting ==
About 300 cars a day use the Richford–Abercorn Border Crossing, located in a rural setting in northern Richford and southern Abercorn. Vermont 139 and Quebec 139 form a roughly north–south road joining the two villages, a railroad line running roughly parallel to the road just to the west. The Canadian border station is located directly on the north side of the border, the main building set between the northbound and southbound lanes. The United States station is about 200 feet (61 m) south of the border, on the west side of the road.

== United States station ==
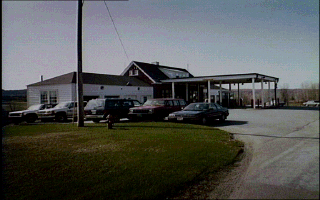
GSA photo of the Richford border station

The United States border station is a rectangular 1 1/2-story brick building. It is flanked on either side by single-story four-bay garages. A metal port-cochere extends across the access lane where incoming traffic is processed. The main building block is three bays wide, with a center entrance providing access to separate spaces for processing immigration and customs. The windows are set in rectangular openings, with brick sills and brick soldier courses above. The entrance is flanked by sidelight windows and topped by a transom, with a keystoned brick arch pattern above. Some of the garage bays on each side have been enclosed and adapted to other uses. The upper level of the building houses two detention cells and storage space.

This border crossing is the main port of entry under the jurisdiction of the Richford station of United States Customs and Border Protection, whose offices are located in the village of Richford. The present station was built in 1932, with funding from the Public Works Administration (PWA). Its construction was prompted by an increase in automobile traffic, and a rise in smuggling activities occasioned by the years of Prohibition in the 1920s, and illegal immigration across the northern border. The building's Colonial Revival style was considered representative of American values. The station is one of 13 built in Vermont by the PWA, of which ten are still standing.

== Canadian station ==
A crossing has existed at this location long before the advent of the automobile. Canada has had a Customs office in Abercorn since 1845. The current Canada border station was built in 1966.

== See also ==
- List of Canada–United States border crossings
- National Register of Historic Places listings in Franklin County, Vermont
