= Bedford, Quebec (city) =

Bedford
- City
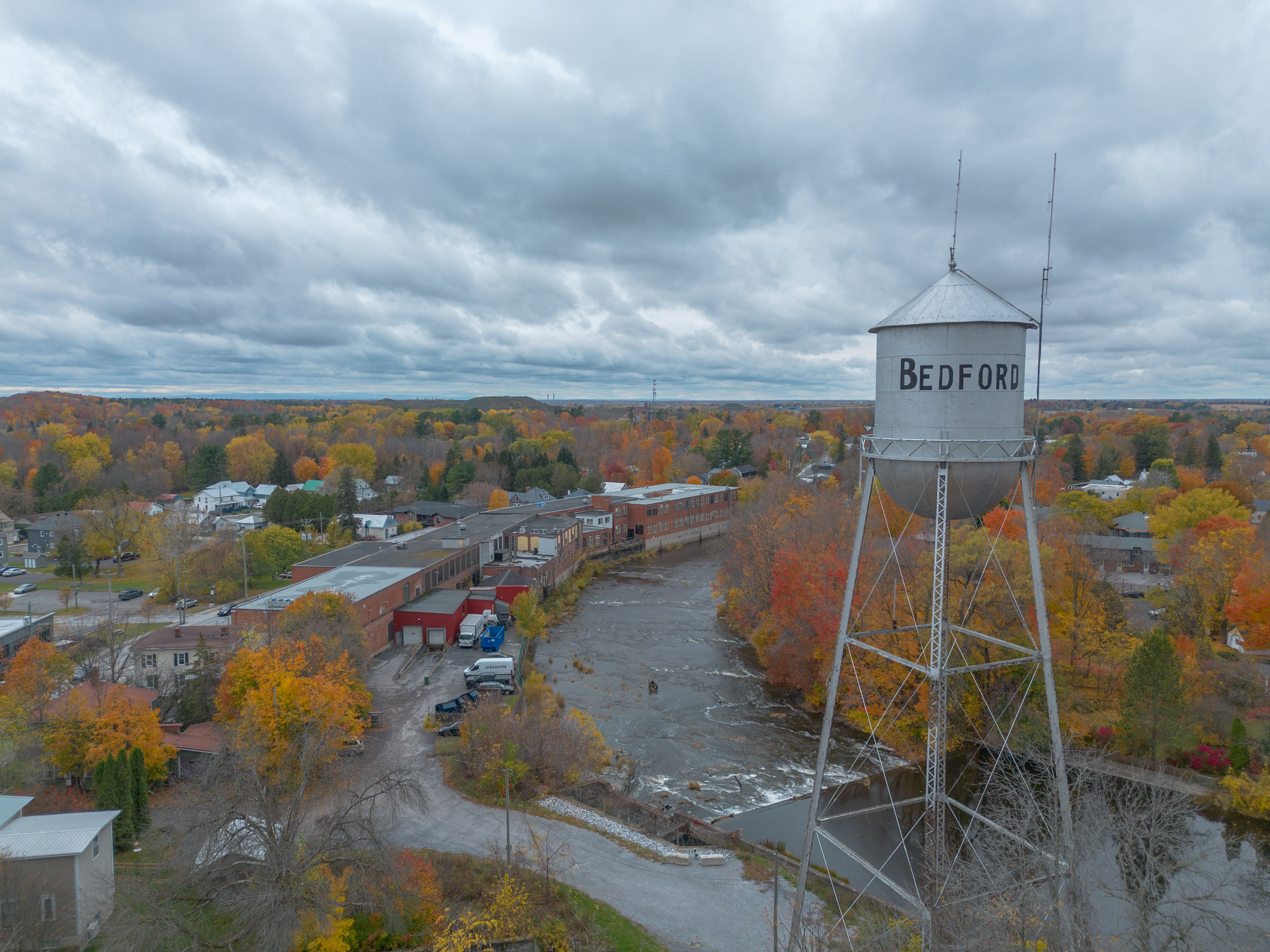
- Bedford in 2025

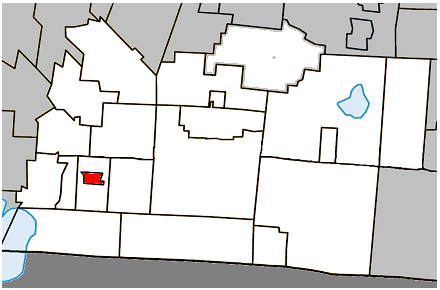
- Location within Brome-Missisquoi RCM.

- Location in southern Quebec.
- Coordinates: 45°07′N 72°59′W
- Country: Canada
- Province: Quebec
- Region: Estrie
- RCM: Brome-Missisquoi
- Constituted: November 21, 1866

Government
  - Mayor: Claude Dubois
  - Federal riding: Brome—Missisquoi
  - Prov. riding: Brome-Missisquoi

Area
  - Total: 4.40 km^{2} (1.70 sq mi)
  - Land: 4.20 km^{2} (1.62 sq mi)
- Elevation: 53 m (174 ft)

Population (2011)
  - Total: 2,684
  - Density: 639.4/km^{2} (1,656/sq mi)
  - Pop 2006-2011: ▲2.8%
  - Dwellings: 1,276
- Time zone: UTC−5 (EST)
  - Summer (DST): UTC−4 (EDT)
- Postal code(s): J0J 1A0
- Area codes: 450 and 579
- Highways: R-202; R-235
- Exchange#: 248
- GNBC Code: EFMFP
- NTS Map: 31H2 Cowansville
- Geocode: 2446035
- People: Bedfordite

Bedford (French pronunciation: [bɛdfœʁd]) is a city located in the Eastern Townships region of southern Quebec, Canada. The population as of the Canada 2011 Census was 2,684. This small community is just an hour's drive from larger cities such as Burlington and Montreal.

== History ==
The first settlers arrived in 1812.

=== Origin of the name ===
The name "Bedford" could have been given by Loyalists who knew of several Bedfords back in the former American colonies. The name could also have been a tribute to Lord John Russell, who was the fourth Duke of Bedford (1710–1771), an English politician and Secretary of State (1748–1751), and governor general of Ireland from 1756 to 1761.

== Geography ==
Bedford is part of Brome-Missisquoi Regional County Municipality, in the administrative region of Estrie.

The town, located 86 kilometres (53 mi) southeast of Montreal, is completely enclaved within the township of Bedford. Seated in the Saint-Lawrence lowlands, at the beginning of the steppe leading to the Appalachian Mountains, the town is separated into north and south parts by the Pike River (Rivière aux Brochets).

== Demographics ==
Historical Census Data - Bedford (city), Quebec
Year	Pop.	±%
1991	2,665	—
1996	2,748	+3.1%
2001	2,667	−2.9%
2006	2,612	−2.1%
2011	2,684	+2.8%

In the 2021 Census of Population conducted by Statistics Canada, Bedford had a population of 2,558 living in 1,233 of its 1,324 total private dwellings, a change of −0.1% from its 2016 population of 2,560. With a land area of 4.23 km^{2} (1.63 sq mi), it had a population density of 604.7/km^{2} (1,566.2/sq mi) in 2021.

Canada census – Bedford (city), Quebec community profile

	2021	2011
Population	2,558 (-0.1% from 2016)	2,684 (+2.8% from 2006)
Land area	4.23 km^{2} (1.63 sq mi)	4.20 km^{2} (1.62 sq mi)
Population density	604.3/km^{2} (1,565/sq mi)	639.4/km^{2} (1,656/sq mi)
Median age	50.4 (M: 48.8, F: 52.4)	46.8 (M: 44.6, F: 48.2)
Private dwellings	1,324 (total) 1,233 (occupied)	1,276 (total)
Median household income	$$55,600	$36,266

References: 2021 2011

Canada Census Mother Tongue - Bedford (city), Quebec
Census	Total	French			English			French & English			Other		
Year	Responses	Count	Trend	Pop %	Count	Trend	Pop %	Count	Trend	Pop %	Count	Trend	Pop %
2011	2,555	1,910	▲2.4%	74.76%	540	▲9.1%	21.14%	70	▲55.5%	2.74%	35	▼36.4%	1.37%
2006	2,460	1,865	▼2.1%	75.81%	495	▼5.7%	20.12%	45	▼10.0%	1.83%	55	▼35.3%	2.24%
2001	2,565	1,905	▼8.2%	74.27%	525	0.0%	20.47%	50	▲233.3%	1.95%	85	▲466.7%	3.31%
1996	2,630	2,075	n/a	78.90%	525	n/a	19.96%	15	n/a	0.57%	15	n/a	0.57%

== Parishes ==
- Roman Catholic Church
- Saint Mitchels Parish
- Le frontere Perish
- The Anglican Parish of Bedford, Philipsburg and Farnham
- United Church

== Activities ==
Every year since 1828, at the beginning of August, the town holds its annual fair, the oldest of its kind in Quebec and the second oldest in Canada. One can figure skate, or play hockey or curling, at the Centre sportif. Every year since 1969, Bedford has held a PeeWee hockey exchange with Kensington, PEI.

== Schools ==
- École primaire et secondaire Monseigneur-Desranleau (French)
- École primaire du Premier Envol (French)
- Butler Elementary (English 1-7)

== Notable people ==
- Georges Thurston (1951–2007) a.k.a. Boule Noire, R&B singer for 30 years.
- Pierre Paradis (1950-), Member of National Assembly of Quebec for 25 years and former Cabinet Minister
- Marcellus Gilmore Edson (1849-1940), chemist who invented peanut butter.

== See also ==
- List of anglophone communities in Quebec
- List of cities in Quebec
