= Pinnacle Road–East Pinnacle Border Crossing =

Canada–United States border crossing

Pinnacle Road-East Pinnacle Border Crossing
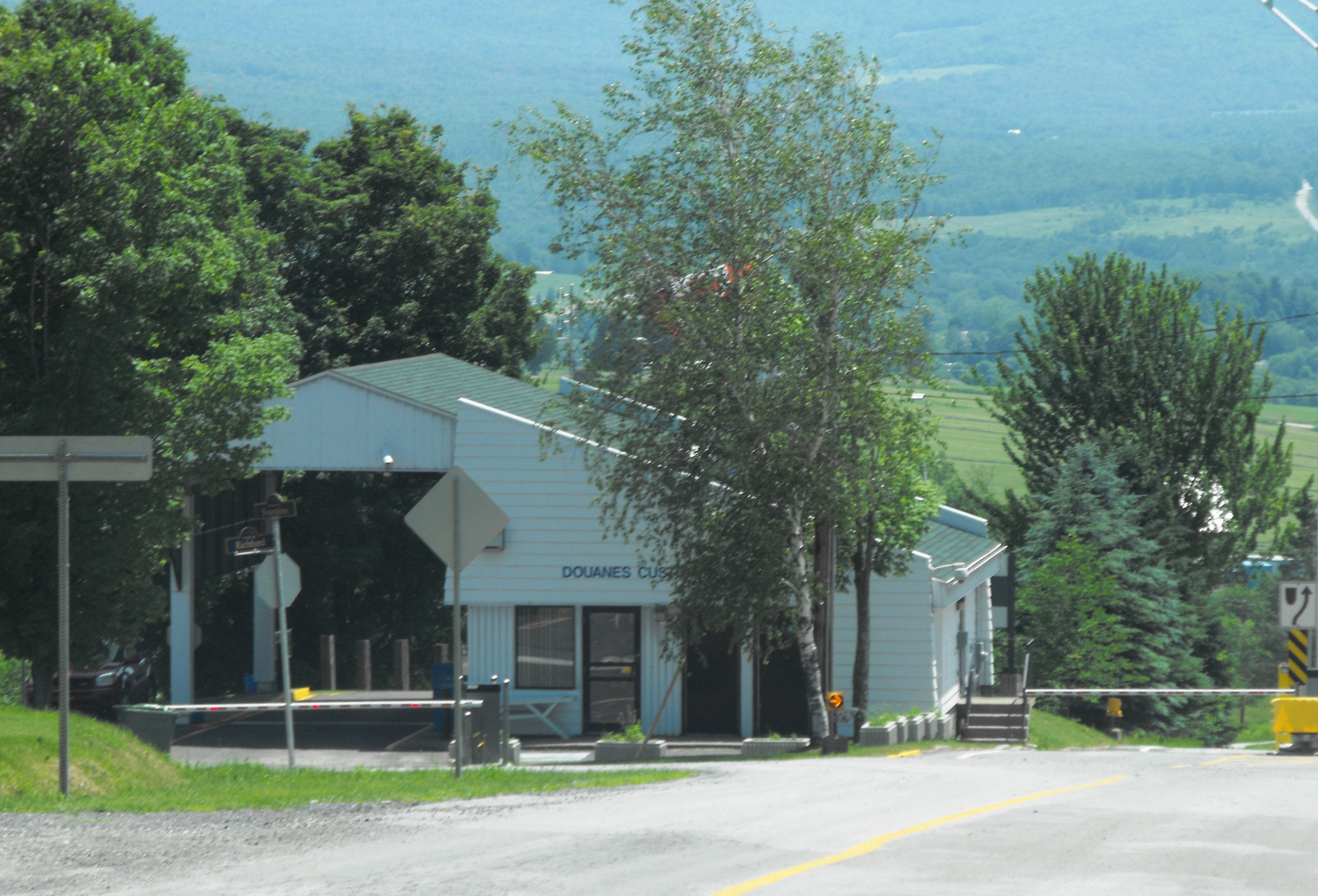
- Canada Border Inspection Station at East Pinnacle, Quebec

Location
- Country: United States; Canada
- Location: Pinnacle Road / Chemin de Richford; US Port: 14 Pinnacle Road, Richford, Vermont 05476; Canadian Port: 383 Richford Road, East Pinnacle, Quebec J0J 1C0
- Coordinates: 45.015602°N 72.699907°W

Details
- Opened: 1976

Website
- https://www.cbp.gov/contact/ports/richford-vermont-0203

The Pinnacle Road–East Pinnacle Border Crossing connects the town of East Pinnacle, Quebec with the western portion of Richford, Vermont. A new US border station at this crossing was built in 2012, directly behind the old border station. For years, the old border station was heated using a solar water heating system.

The border crossing is one of the least busy in Vermont, with three to 20 cars using it a day. For many years, there were no border inspection services at this location. Finally in 1971, the US built a border inspection station. Canada built its border station in 1982, rerouting Chemin de la Frontiere around it. Both the US and Canadian border stations are open only from 8 AM to 4 PM, seven days a week.

== See also ==
- List of Canada–United States border crossings
