= Brome-Missisquoi =

Brome-Missisquoi may refer to:

- Brome-Missisquoi Regional County Municipality, Quebec
- Brome—Missisquoi (federal electoral district)
- Brome-Missisquoi (provincial electoral district)
