= Quebec Route 215 =

Highway in Quebec, Canada

Route 215

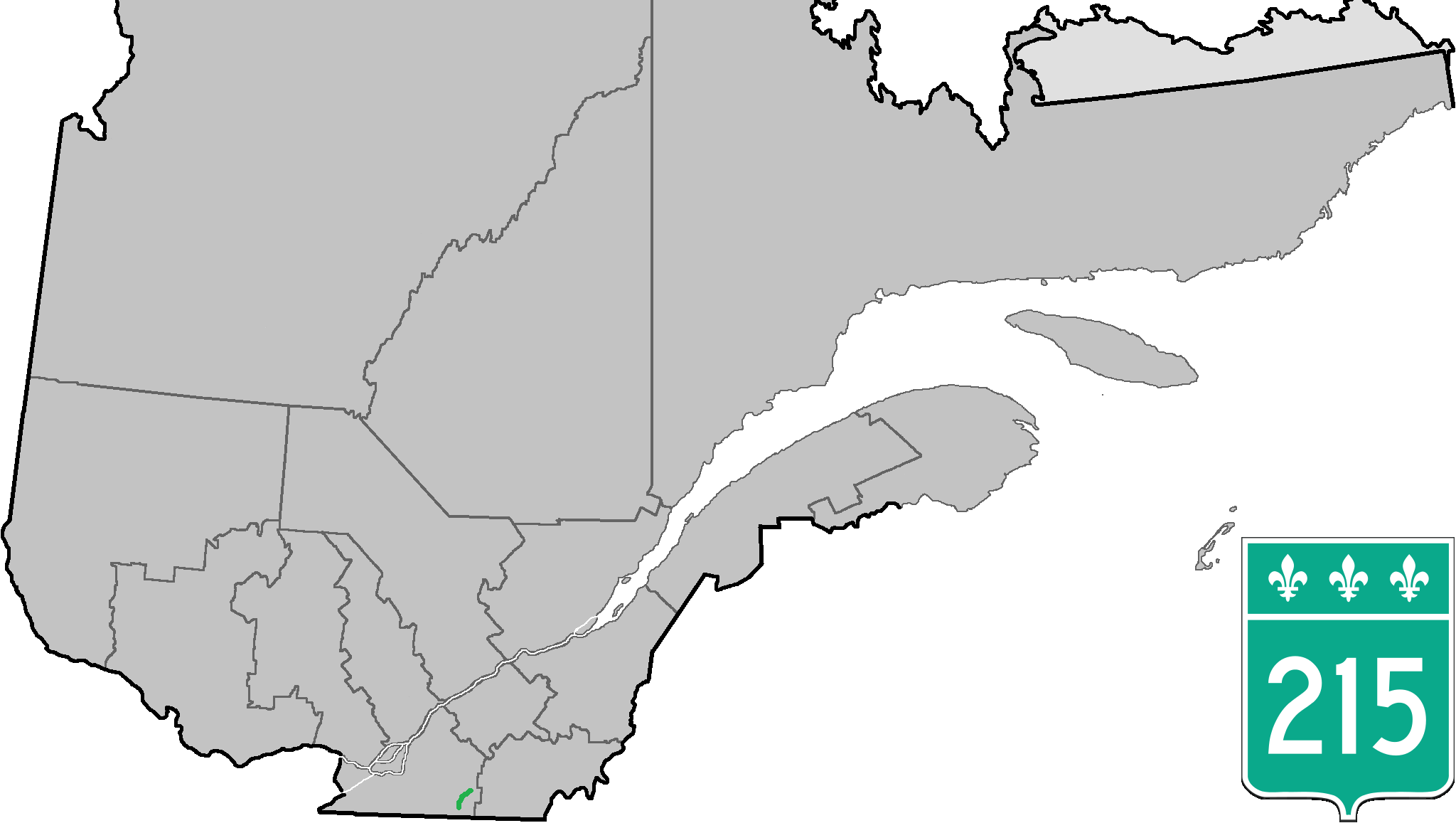

Route information
- Maintained by Transports Québec
- Length: 24.1 km (15.0 mi)

Major junctions
- South end: R-139 in Sutton
- R-104 in Lac-Brome
- North end: R-243 in Lac-Brome

Location
- Country: Canada
- Province: Quebec

Highway system
- Quebec provincial highways; Autoroutes; List; Former
← R-214	→ R-216

Route 215 is a two-lane north–south highway in Quebec, Canada. It starts in Sutton at the junction of Route 139 and links it to Brome and Fulford, in the northern part of Lac-Brome, where it ends at the junction of Route 243. It is the shortest link between Sutton and Autoroute 10.

== Municipalities along Route 215 ==
- Sutton
- Brome
- Lac-Brome

== Major intersections ==
RCM or ET	Municipality	Km	Junction	Notes
Southern terminus of Route 215
Brome-Missisquoi	Sutton	0.0	R-139	139 SOUTH: to Abercorn; 139 NORTH: to Brome
Brome-Missisquoi	Lac-Brome	13.3	R-104	104 WEST: to Cowansville; 104 EAST: to Knowlton
Brome-Missisquoi	Lac-Brome	24.1	R-243	243 SOUTH: to Knowlton; 243 NORTH: to Shefford
Northern terminus of Route 215

== See also ==
- List of Quebec provincial highways
