= Stanbridge =

Stanbridge may refer to:

== Places ==
- Stanbridge, Bedfordshire
- Stanbridge, Dorset
- Stanbridge, Quebec (disambiguation)
- Stanbridge, New South Wales

== People with the surname ==
- Aleah Stanbridge (1976–2016), South African singer-songwriter
