= Brigham, Quebec =

Brigham
- Municipality
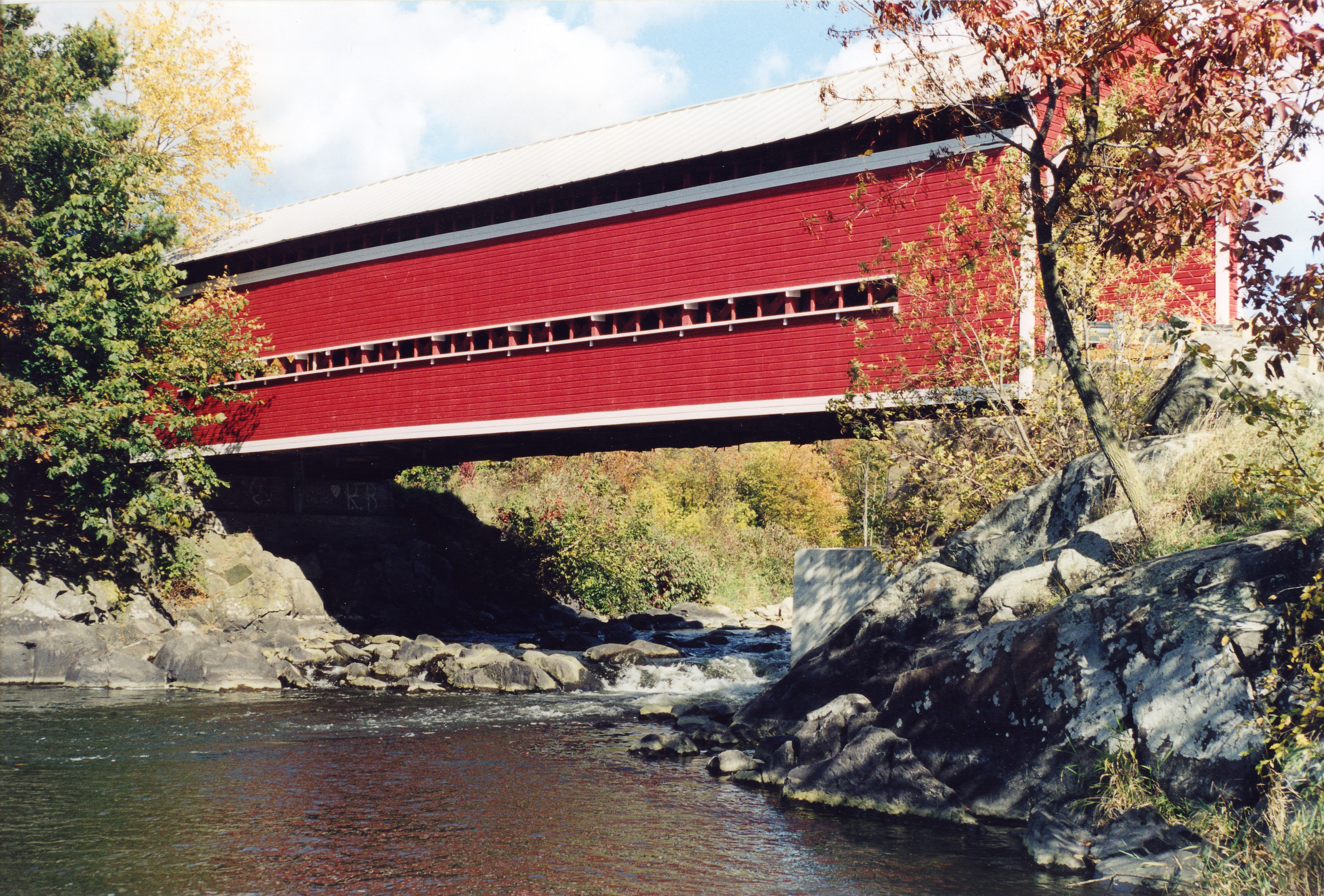
- Balthazar Covered Bridge in Brigham.

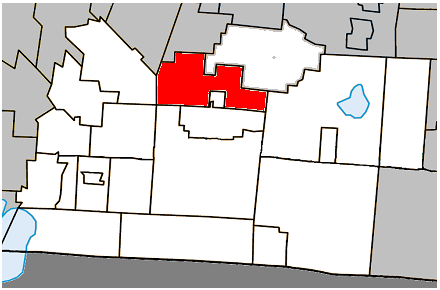
- Location within Brome-Missisquoi RCM.

- Location in southern Quebec.
- Coordinates: 45°15′N 72°51′W
- Country: Canada
- Province: Quebec
- Region: Estrie
- RCM: Brome-Missisquoi
- Constituted: July 1, 1855

Government
  - Mayor: Philippe Dunn
  - Federal riding: Brome—Missisquoi
  - Prov. riding: Brome-Missisquoi

Area
  - Total: 88.40 km^{2} (34.13 sq mi)
  - Land: 87.08 km^{2} (33.62 sq mi)

Population (2011)
  - Total: 2,457
  - Density: 28.2/km^{2} (73/sq mi)
  - Pop 2006-2011: ▲2.0%
  - Dwellings: 1,071
- Time zone: UTC−5 (EST)
  - Summer (DST): UTC−4 (EDT)
- Postal code(s): J2K 4K4
- Area codes: 450 and 579
- Highways: R-104; R-139
- Website: www.brigham.ca

Brigham is a municipality located in the province of Quebec, Canada. The population as of the Canada 2011 Census was 2,457. Part of the Brome-Missisquoi Regional County Municipality, in the administrative region of Estrie, the municipality is west of Cowansville and close to Bromont.

== History ==
Founded in 1855, its name became Adamsville in 1961, in honour of George Adams, owner of the land on which the church was founded in 1873. In 1980, there was a further name-change in favour of Brigham – this time to pay homage to Erratus Oakley Brigham, owner of the town's largest business (a brick factory) throughout the mid-19th century.

== Demographics ==
=== Population ===
Canada census – Brigham community profile

	2021	2011
Population	2,282 (-1.0% from 2016)	2,457 (+2.0% from 2006)
Land area	86.92 km^{2} (33.56 sq mi)	87.08 km^{2} (33.62 sq mi)
Population density	26.3/km^{2} (68/sq mi)	28.2/km^{2} (73/sq mi)
Median age	46.4 (M: 46.4, F: 46.0)	42.0 (M: 42.7, F: 41.5)
Private dwellings	1,027 (total) 958 (occupied)	1,071 (total)
Median household income	$76,000	$54,214

References: 2021 2011

Historical Census Data - Brigham, Quebec

Year	Pop.	±%
1991	2,284	—
1996	2,290	+0.3%

Year	Pop.	±%
2001	2,250	−1.7%
2006	2,408	+7.0%

Year	Pop.	±%
2011	2,457	+2.0%

=== Language ===
Canada Census Mother Tongue - Brigham, Quebec
Census	Total	French			English			French & English			Other		
Year	Responses	Count	Trend	Pop %	Count	Trend	Pop %	Count	Trend	Pop %	Count	Trend	Pop %
2011	2,445	2,065	▲8.5%	84.46%	300	▼26.8%	12.27%	35	0.0%	1.43%	45	▼30.8%	1.84%
2006	2,400	1,890	▲1.6%	78.75%	410	▲34.1%	17.08%	35	▼41.7%	1.46%	65	▲7.7%	2.71%
2001	2,250	1,860	▼3.4%	82.67%	270	▼23.9%	12.00%	60	▲ n/a%	2.67%	60	▲75.0%	2.67%
1996	2,295	1,925	n/a	83.88%	355	n/a	15.47%	0	n/a	0.00%	15	n/a	0.65%

== Attractions ==
The Brigham area is home to two covered bridges, one of which was totally restored in 2001. The village centre is home to the neo-Renaissance Brigham Manor, built in 1865. Brigham is referenced in the 1938 film Love Finds Andy Hardy.

== See also ==
- List of anglophone communities in Quebec
- List of municipalities in Quebec
- 2005 Brigham municipal election
