= F.W. Wheeler House =

Historic house in Vermont, United States

- U.S. National Register of Historic Places
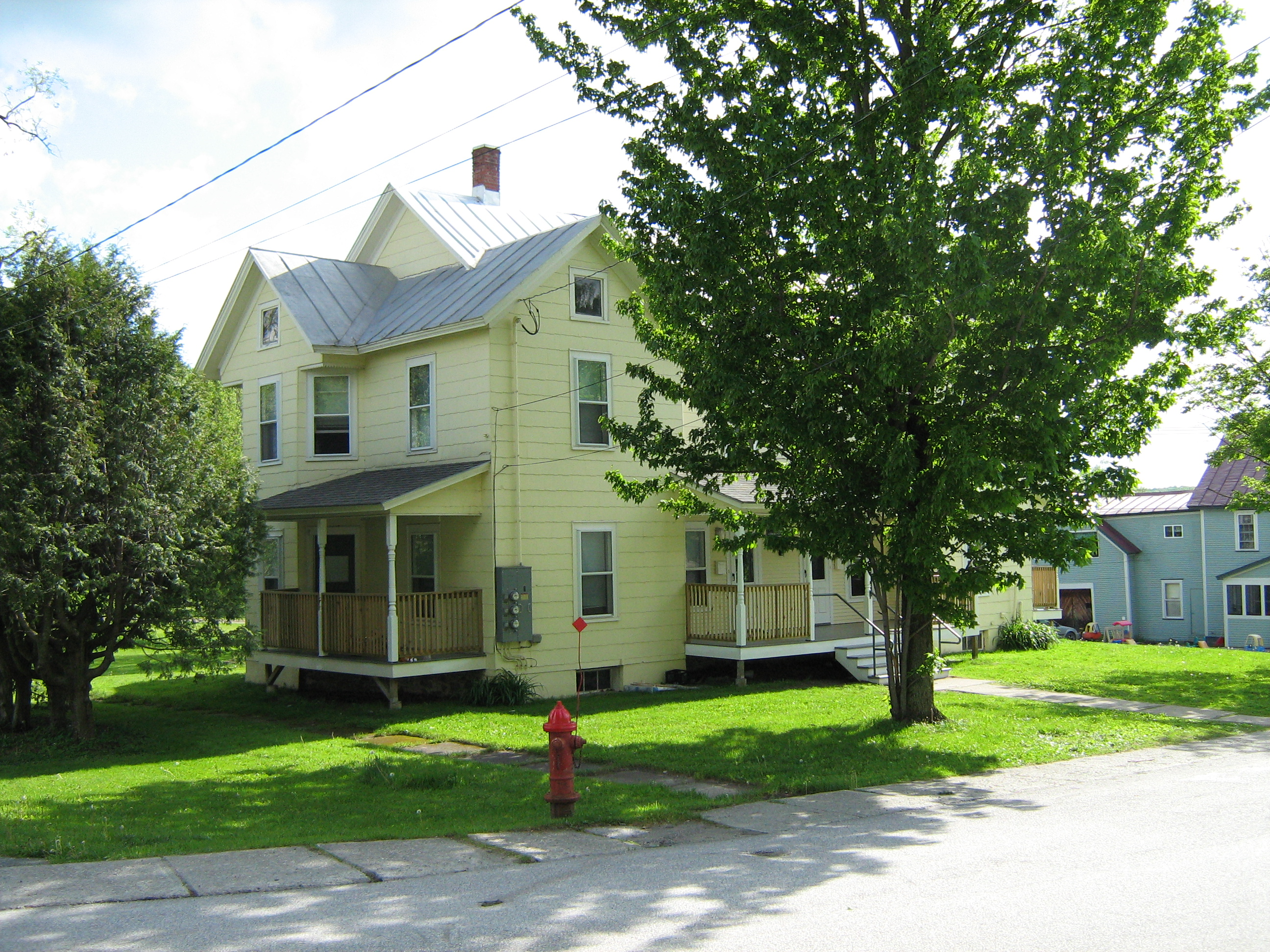

- Location within Vermont Location within the United States
- Location: 31 Intervale Ave., Richford, Vermont
- Coordinates: 44°59′37″N 72°40′31″W
- Area: 0.4 acres (0.16 ha)
- Built: 1904
- Architectural style: Queen Anne
- NRHP reference No.: 04000445
- Added to NRHP: May 12, 2004

The F.W. Wheeler House is a historic two-family residence at 31 Intervale Street in Richford, Vermont. Built in 1904 for a photographer, it is an unusual instance in the community of a duplex with Queen Anne styling. It was listed on the National Register of Historic Places in 2004.

== Description and history ==
The F.W. Wheeler House stands on the south side of Intervale Street, a residential side street in the village of Richford. It is a 2 1/2-story wood-frame structure, with a symmetrical appearance that is still characterized by details typical of the Queen Anne period, better known for its asymmetrical designs. The main roof ridge runs parallel to the street, with lower gable sections projecting to the front and sides at each end. A porch extends between the front-facing projections, supported by turned posts, and there are similar porches on the sides. The interiors of the two units are organized as mirror images of each other, and retain original woodwork, wrought iron heating grates, and other features.

The house was built in 1904 for F.W. Wheeler, a native of Bristol, Vermont who had established a photography business in the bustling border town. It is unclear if Wheeler had it built as a rental property or if he occupied one of its units. The house is unusual because most of Richford's housing stock of the period was modestly scaled single-family units. The house's design matches in some details a pattern for a single-family residence published by the Radford Architectural Company in 1898.

== See also ==
- National Register of Historic Places listings in Franklin County, Vermont
