= Brome, Quebec =

Village municipality in Quebec, Canada

Brome
- Village municipality
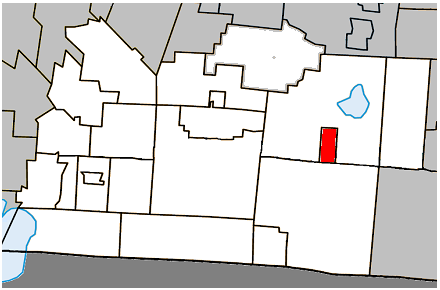
- Location within Brome-Missisquoi RCM

- Location in southern Quebec
- Coordinates: 45°12′N 72°34′W
- Country: Canada
- Province: Quebec
- Region: Estrie
- RCM: Brome-Missisquoi
- Constituted: June 20, 1923

Government
  - Mayor: William Miller
  - Federal riding: Brome—Missisquoi
  - Provincial riding: Brome-Missisquoi

Area
  - Total: 11.50 km^{2} (4.44 sq mi)
  - Land: 11.56 km^{2} (4.46 sq mi)

Population (2021)
  - Total: 341
  - Density: 29.5/km^{2} (76/sq mi)
  - Pop. 2016–2021: ▲15.2%
  - Dwellings: 169
- Time zone: UTC−5 (EST)
  - Summer (DST): UTC−4 (EDT)
- Postal code: J0E 1K0
- Area codes: 450, 579 and 354
- Highways: R-215
- Website: bromevillage.ca

Brome is a village municipality in the Brome-Missisquoi Regional County Municipality of the Estrie region of Quebec, Canada. The municipality lies between the town of Brome Lake and the city of Sutton. It had a population of 341 in the 2021 Canadian census.

The settlement, formerly known as Brome Corners, developed at the intersection of two early regional roads. It was a stagecoach stop and briefly served as a local transportation centre before later roads and railways bypassed it. The Brome County Agricultural Society moved its annual exhibition to the village in 1890. The resulting agricultural fair, commonly known as the Brome Fair, remains the municipality's largest annual event.

== Toponymy ==
The name Brome was first applied to the surrounding township, which appeared on a map prepared by surveyors Samuel Gale and Jean-Baptiste Duberger in 1795. The township was proclaimed in 1797, and the name was later applied to Brome Lake, the former county and the present village municipality.

The Commission de toponymie du Québec gives two possible English sources for the name. It may have been taken from Brome, Suffolk, or from Brome Hall, the Suffolk estate of the Cornwallis family. Charles Cornwallis held the courtesy title Viscount Brome before succeeding his father in 1762.

The settlement was known as Brome Corners during the nineteenth century. The word Corners referred to the intersection around which the village developed.

== History ==
=== Indigenous presence ===
Brome lies within Ndakina, the ancestral territory of the W8banaki Nation. The territory extends westward to the Richelieu River and includes much of the Eastern Townships.

Archaeological work elsewhere in Brome-Missisquoi has documented a much older regional presence without establishing a known archaeological site in Brome village itself. Research undertaken by the Université de Montréal and the regional county municipality identified 19 sites in Brome-Missisquoi, 18 of them dating from before sustained European settlement. The oldest evidence dates to about 5,000 years before the present. Sites were concentrated along the Pike, Yamaska and Missisquoi river systems, where mobile groups hunted, fished and participated in exchange networks extending into present-day New York State.

By the end of the sixteenth century, the region formed part of the hunting territory used by Western Abenaki groups. The waterways connecting the Richelieu, Missisquoi and Yamaska basins continued to be used for travel and seasonal subsistence.

=== Township settlement ===
Settlement by people of European descent began in Brome Township during the 1790s. Jonathan Hart settled in its southern part in 1794, followed by Henry Collins in 1795 and Collins's brother Ebenezer in 1796. Governor Robert Prescott granted approximately 46,200 acres (18,700 ha) in Brome Township to Asa Porter and 32 associates on August 18, 1797. The settlers came mainly from New England and New York. Although some were United Empire Loyalists, others had supported the American Revolution or migrated chiefly because land was available.

By 1831–1832, surveyor general Joseph Bouchette recorded about 1,314 inhabitants in the township. Its economy was based on farming and small mills. Wheat, barley, oats, peas, corn, apples and maple sugar were among the products raised or made locally. Bouchette counted seven sawmills, two flour mills, a distillery, five schools, a church and a small settlement of about 15 houses.

=== Brome Corners ===
The village grew on both sides of Stagecoach Road, at the meeting of an east–west road between Saint-Jean and Knowlton Landing and a north–south road between Waterloo and Abercorn. It was known as Brome Corners by the 1850s. A daily stagecoach connected Saint-Jean, Brome and Knowlton.

A Congregationalist congregation built a stone church in Brome in 1842–1843. Nathaniel and Jeremiah Pettes opened a general store in the village in 1844, before moving their business to Knowlton in 1855.

Brome County was created in 1855 from parts of Shefford, Missisquoi and Stanstead counties. Brome Corners initially occupied a useful position near the centre of the road network, although Knowlton became the county seat. The Brome County Community Hall was given to the community in 1857.

The construction of railways through other settlements reduced the village's importance as a transportation stop. Improved roads across the low-lying valleys also allowed travellers to avoid the older crossroads. Brome remained primarily an agricultural settlement.

=== Municipal development ===
The village municipality of Brome was constituted on June 20, 1923, from part of the township municipality of Brome. When the township municipality and the municipalities of Knowlton and Foster were amalgamated in 1971 to form the Town of Brome Lake, Brome village remained a separate municipality.

== Geography ==
Brome covers a land area of 11.56 km^{2} (4.46 sq mi). It is bordered on the north, east and west by the Town of Brome Lake and on the south by Sutton. The settlement is centred on Stagecoach Road and Route 215, locally known as Valley Road. The municipality is largely rural, with farms, fields and wooded properties surrounding the compact village centre.

The terrain forms part of the Appalachian foothills between Brome Lake and the Sutton Mountains. Streams draining the area flow toward the Yamaska South East River, whose headwaters rise north of Sutton.

== Demographics ==
In the 2021 Census of Population, Brome had a population of 341 living in 151 of its 169 private dwellings. This was an increase of 15.2 per cent from its 2016 population of 296. With a land area of 11.56 km^{2} (4.46 sq mi), it had a population density of 29.5/km^{2} (76.4/sq mi).

Historical census populations
Year	Pop.	±% p.a.
1996	287	—
2001	286	−0.07%
2006	278	−0.57%
2011	271	−0.51%
2016	296	+1.78%
2021	341	+2.87%
Sources: Statistics Canada census profiles.

English remained the most commonly reported single mother tongue in 2021. Of the residents included in the language count, 195 reported English as their sole mother tongue and 125 reported French. Fifteen reported both English and French, while five reported another language.

Mother tongue, 2021
Language	Population	Percentage
English only	195	57.4%
French only	125	36.8%
English and French	15	4.4%
Other languages	5	1.5%

== Government ==
Brome is governed by a mayor and six councillors, each elected to a numbered council seat rather than a territorial district. Council decisions are adopted by resolution during public municipal meetings.

William Miller was returned as mayor by acclamation in the 2025 municipal election. The council elected for the 2025–2029 term consists of Anthony Allen, Wesley Patch, Lynn Patenaude, Lisa Bélanger, Christopher Whitehead and Larry Royea.

Brome is part of the federal electoral district of Brome—Missisquoi and the provincial electoral district of Brome-Missisquoi.

== Brome Fair ==
The Brome Fair is organized by the Brome County Agricultural Society. The society was formed at a public meeting held at Albert Kimball's inn in Knowlton on July 12, 1856. Paul Holland Knowlton chaired the meeting and Nathaniel Pettes served as secretary. George Boright was chosen as the society's first president.

The first exhibitions were held in Knowlton, initially on land now occupied by the Lac-Brome Museum and later on the present site of Knowlton Academy. The society held both winter and autumn exhibitions for several years before retaining only the autumn event in 1861.

In 1890, the society bought 12 acres (4.9 ha) at Brome Corners and moved the exhibition there. The mayors of the municipalities then forming Brome County formally established the site in 1891, allowing the society to construct permanent exhibition buildings. The grounds have since expanded to about 18 acres (7.3 ha).

The fair is held over the Labour Day weekend. Its agricultural programmes includes dairy and beef cattle, horses, sheep, goats, horticulture, baking and handicraft exhibits. Entertainment and mechanical rides were added over time, but livestock judging and other agricultural competitions remain part of the event. Attendance generally exceeds 30,000. The fair recorded 36,400 visitors in 2023, while its highest reported attendance was 49,160 in 1995.

The fair was presented virtually in 2020 and cancelled in 2021 during the COVID-19 pandemic in Quebec.

== Built heritage ==
Several buildings survive from Brome's nineteenth-century development. The former Congregationalist stone church was erected in 1842–1843 for a congregation of about 15 people. Its steeple was later removed and the building was converted into a house.

St. John the Evangelist Anglican Church was built in 1859. The Gothic Revival building was constructed with materials and labour contributed by residents and continues to be used by its congregation.

The Brome County Community Hall dates from 1857. Along with the agricultural fairgrounds, it survives from the period when Brome Corners was a stopping place on the regional stagecoach routes.

== Transportation ==
Route 215 crosses the municipality from north to south, connecting Brome with Knowlton and Sutton. Within the village it follows Valley Road. Stagecoach Road preserves the course and name of the older route that carried coaches between settlements in the Eastern Townships.

Brome was not located on the railway lines later built through Foster, West Brome and Sutton. As rail travel replaced the stagecoach and new roadbuilding opened more direct routes through the surrounding valleys, traffic shifted away from Brome Corners.

== See also ==
- List of anglophone communities in Quebec
- List of village municipalities in Quebec
- Brome County, Quebec
- Brome Lake, Quebec
