= East Farnham =

- Municipality
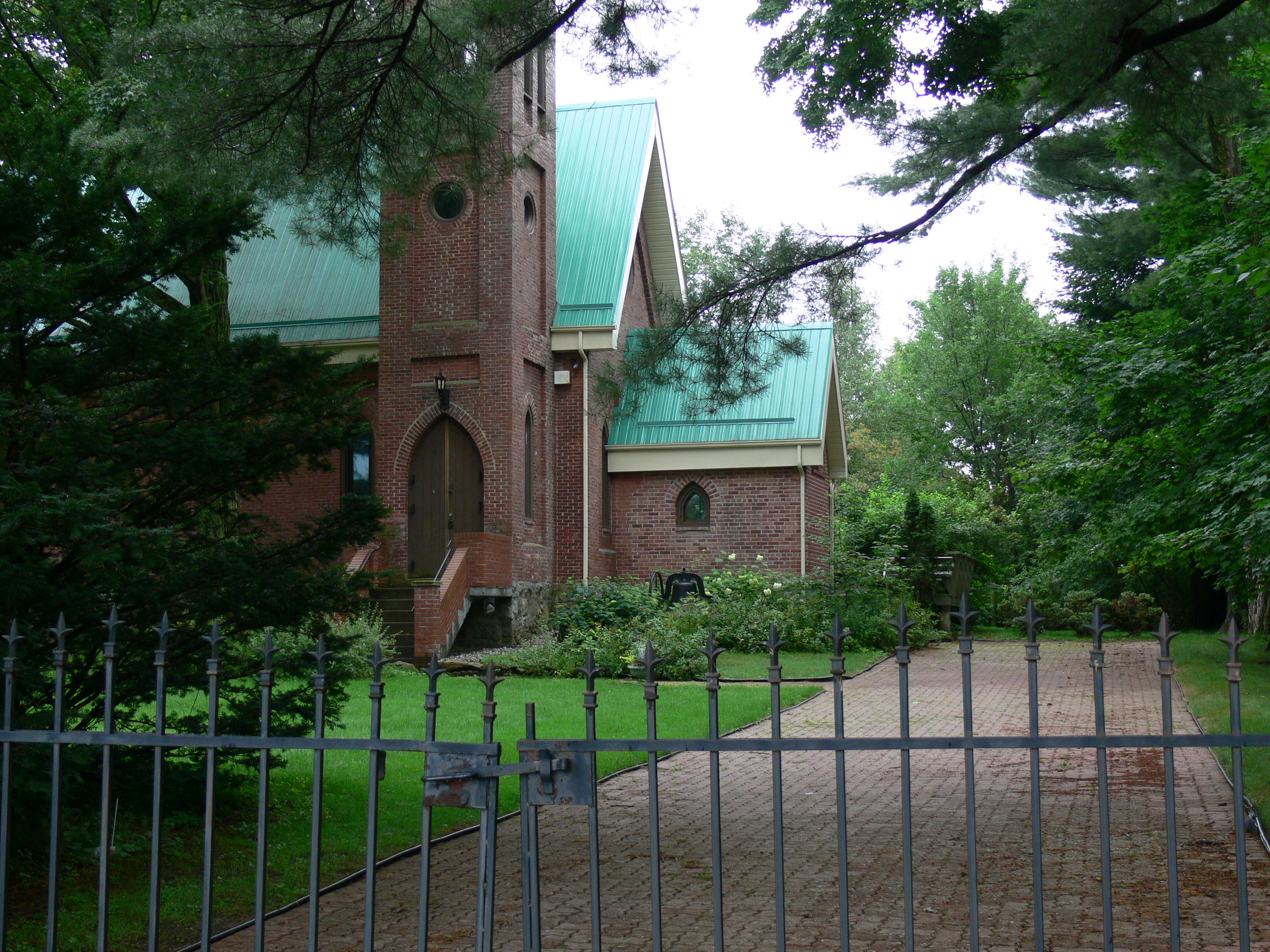

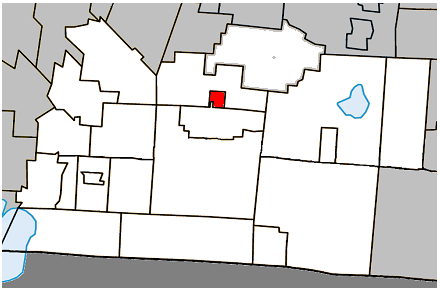
- Location within Brome-Missisquoi RCM.

- Location in southern Quebec.
- Coordinates: 45°14′N 72°46′W
- Country: Canada
- Province: Quebec
- Region: Estrie
- RCM: Brome-Missisquoi
- Constituted: August 27, 1914

Government
  - Mayor: Caroline Cusson
  - Federal riding: Brome—Missisquoi
  - Prov. riding: Brome-Missisquoi

Area
  - Total: 5.00 km^{2} (1.93 sq mi)
  - Land: 5.02 km^{2} (1.94 sq mi)

Population (2021)
  - Total: 612
  - Density: 121.9/km^{2} (316/sq mi)
  - Pop 2016-2021: ▲10.5%
  - Dwellings: 271
- Time zone: UTC−05:00 (EST)
  - Summer (DST): UTC−04:00 (EDT)
- Postal code(s): J2K 4T5
- Area codes: 450 and 579
- Highways: R-139
- Website: www.municipalite. eastfarnham.qc.ca

East Farnham is a municipality located in the province of Quebec, Canada. It is part of Brome-Missisquoi Regional County Municipality, in the administrative region of Estrie. The population as of the 2021 Canadian Census was 612.

== Demographics ==
=== Population ===
Population trend:

Census	Population	Change (%)
2021	612	▲10.5%
2016	554	▲0.2%
2011	553	▲14.3%
2006	484	▼8.0%
2001	526	▲1.5%
1996	518	▼1.1%
1991	524	N/A

=== Language ===
Mother tongue language (2021)

Language	Population	Pct (%)
French only	470	76.4%
English only	110	17.9%
Both English and French	20	3.3%
Other languages	10	1.6%

== See also ==
- List of anglophone communities in Quebec
- List of municipalities in Quebec
