= Marcellus Gilmore Edson =

Canadian chemist and pharmacist; inventor of peanut butter

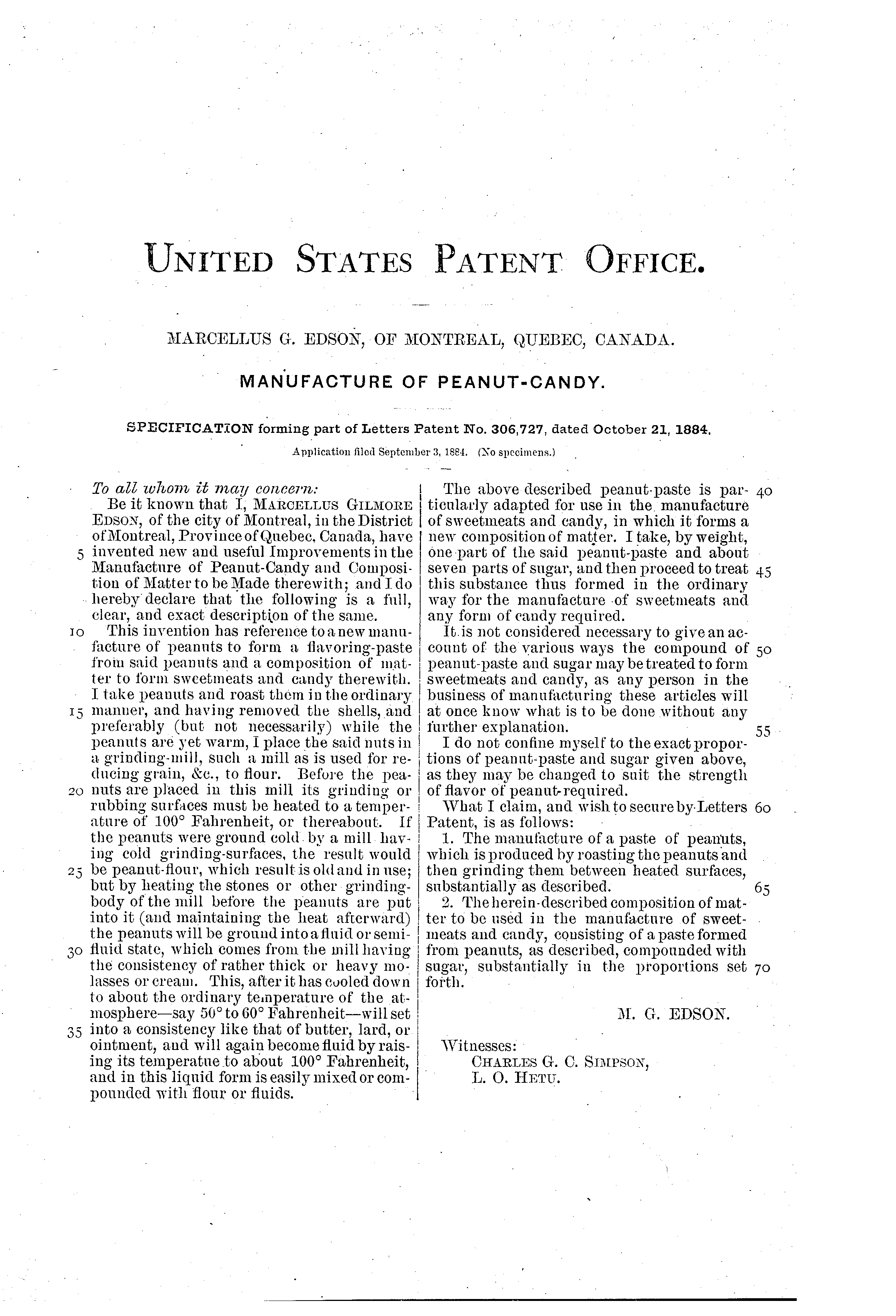
- Patent for peanut butter
- Born: February 7, 1849; Bedford, Quebec, Province of Canada
- Died: March 6, 1940 (aged 91); Montreal, Quebec, Canada
- Known for: Development of peanut butter

Marcellus Gilmore Edson (February 7, 1849 – March 6, 1940) was a Canadian chemist and pharmacist. in 1884, he patented a way to make peanut paste, an early version of peanut butter.

== Biography ==
Marcellus Gilmore Edson was born at Bedford in Quebec. Trained as a chemist at what is now McGill University, Edson worked within his professional sphere. In 1884 Edson invented a process to make "peanut paste" for the production of candy, and was awarded United States Patent No. 306727 for that invention. When cooled, his product had "a consistency like that of butter, lard, or ointment". The patent describes a process of using heated equipment to mill roasted peanuts until the peanuts reached "a fluid or semi-fluid state", and then optionally mixing the resulting paste with sugar for use in confectionaries.
