= Richford Primary School =

- U.S. National Register of Historic Places
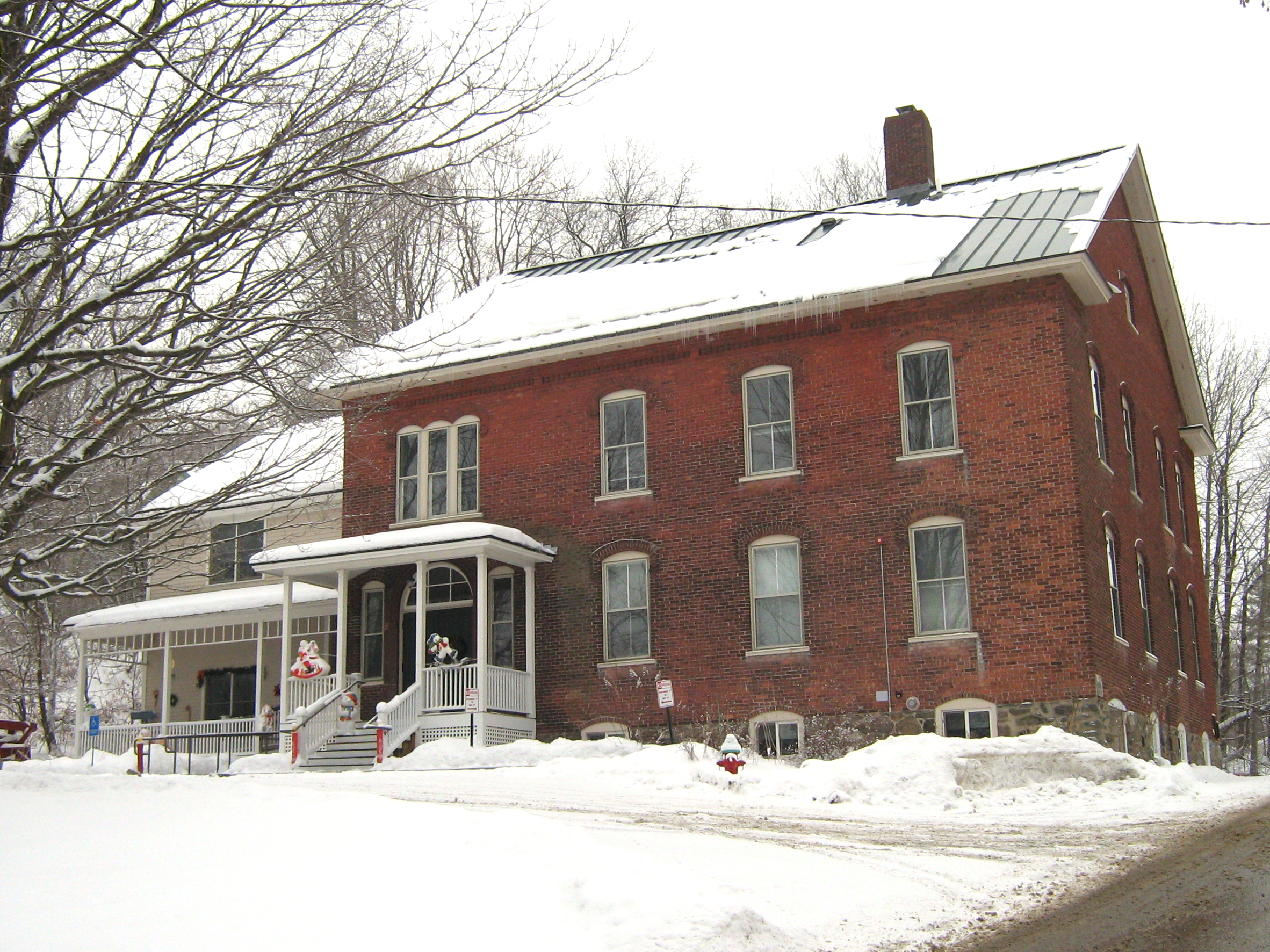

- Location within Vermont Location within the United States
- Location: 140 Intervale Ave., Richford, Vermont
- Coordinates: 44°59′47″N 72°40′31″W
- Area: 0.5 acres (0.20 ha)
- Built: 1903
- Built by: Parker, L.B.
- Architectural style: Italianate
- MPS: Educational Resources of Vermont MPS
- NRHP reference No.: 04000443
- Added to NRHP: May 12, 2004

The Richford Primary School is a historic school building at 140 Intervale Avenue in Richford, Vermont. Built in 1903 to address an overcrowding problem in the local schools, it served the town until 1968, and has since been converted into residential use. It was listed on the National Register of Historic Places in 2004.

== Description and history ==
The former Richford Primary School building stands in a residential area on the west side of Richford's main village, on the east side of Intervate Avenue overlooking the Missisquoi River. It is a roughly square 2 1/2-story brick building, with a gabled roof that has the gable end facing the street. The main facade, four bays wide, faces north toward the parking lot, with the main entrance in the leftmost bay, sheltered by a gable-roofed porch. The entrance is set in a round-arch opening, and is flanked by sidelight windows in narrow segmented-arch openings. Other windows are also set in segmented-arch openings, with brick headers and stone sills. A modern wood-frame ell extends to the main block's east.

The town of Richford began consolidating its district schools in 1892, after the state abolished the district school system. This combined with compulsory school attendance requirements led to an increase in the need for school space. The town's Second Academy, built in 1894 on the site of the First Academy (destroyed by fire), was by 1900 suffering from overcrowding. The present school was built adjacent to the Second Academy in 1903 by L.B. Parker at a cost of $6,000. It served the town until 1968, and was used by a local business as storage until 2003, when it underwent conversion to senior housing.

== See also ==
- National Register of Historic Places listings in Franklin County, Vermont
