= Béthanie, Quebec =

Béthanie
- Municipality
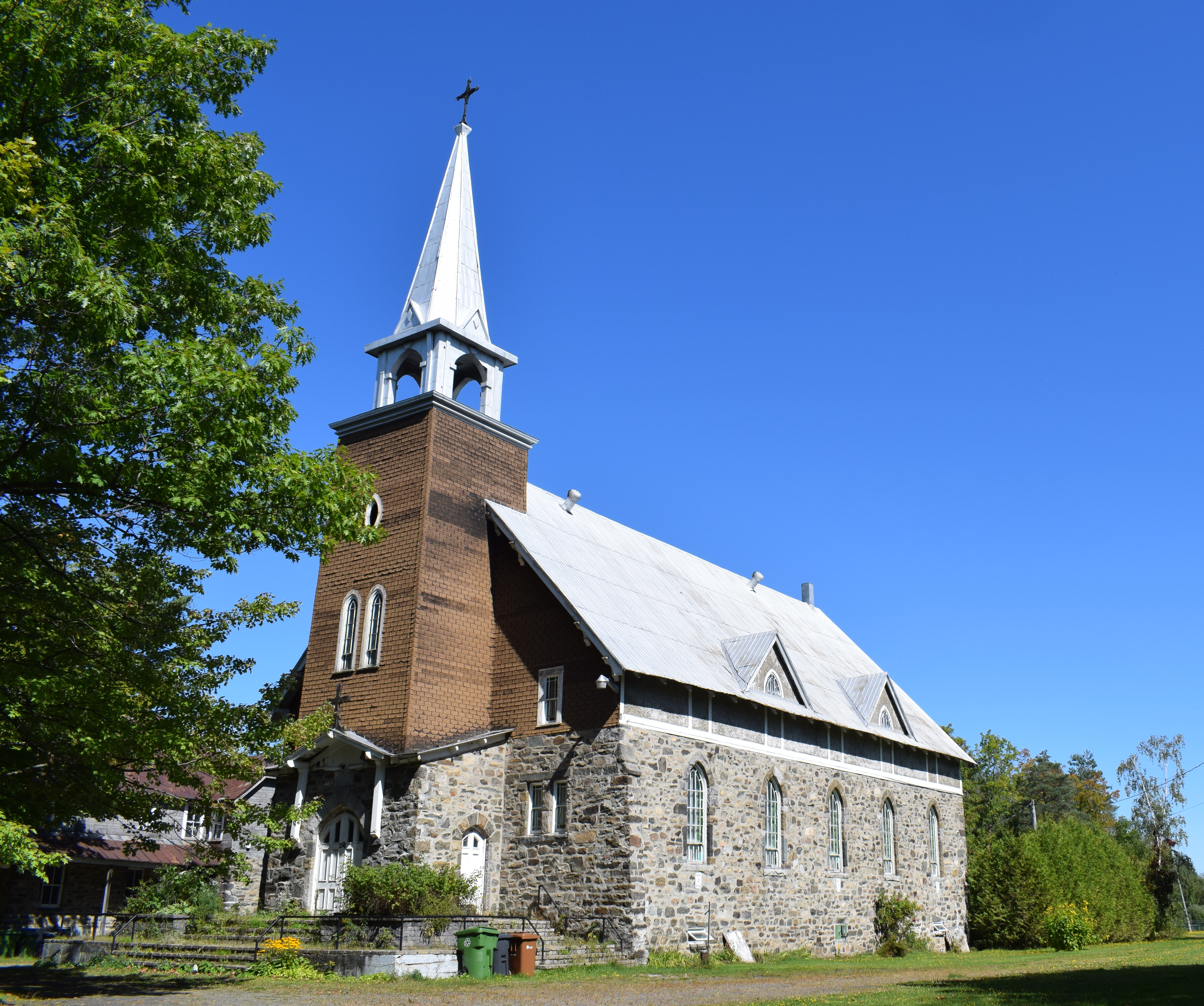

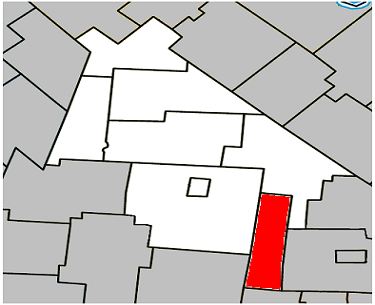
- Location within Acton RCM

- Location in southern Quebec
- Coordinates: 45°30′N 72°26′W
- Country: Canada
- Province: Quebec
- Region: Montérégie
- RCM: Acton
- Constituted: March 2, 1920

Government
  - Mayor: Christian Peiry
  - Federal riding: Saint-Hyacinthe—Bagot—Acton
  - Prov. riding: Daniel-Johnson

Area
  - Total: 47.00 km^{2} (18.15 sq mi)
  - Land: 46.53 km^{2} (17.97 sq mi)

Population (2011)
  - Total: 314
  - Density: 6.7/km^{2} (17/sq mi)
  - Pop 2006-2011: ▼5.1%
  - Dwellings: 149
- Time zone: UTC−5 (EST)
  - Summer (DST): UTC−4 (EDT)
- Postal code(s): J0H 1E1
- Area codes: 450 and 579
- Highways: No major routes
- Website: municipalitedebethanie.ca

Béthanie (French pronunciation: [betani]) is a municipality in the Regional County Municipality of Acton, in the province of Quebec, Canada. The population as of the Canada 2011 Census was 314. The number signified a slight but continued decline of population across five national censuses since 1991.

== Demographics ==
=== Population ===
Population trend:

Census	Population	Change (%)
2011	314	▼5.1%
2006	331	▼2.1%
2001	338	▼4.5%
1996	354	▼6.3%
1991	378	N/A

=== Language ===
Mother tongue language (2006)

Language	Population	Pct (%)
French only	280	90.32%
English only	20	6.45%
Both English and French	0	0.00%
Other languages	10	3.23%

== See also ==
- List of municipalities in Quebec
