= 2005 Brigham municipal election =

The 2005 Brigham municipal election was held on November 6, 2005, to elect a mayor and councillors in Brigham, Quebec.

== Results ==
2005 Brigham election, Mayor of Brigham
Candidate	Total votes	% of total votes
(incumbent)Steven Neil	accl.	.

2005 Brigham election, Councillor, District One
Candidate	Total votes	% of total votes
(incumbent)Daniel Meunier	accl.	.

2005 Brigham election, Councillor, District Two
Candidate	Total votes	% of total votes
(incumbent)Michelyne Cournoyer	accl.	.

2005 Brigham election, Councillor, District Three
Candidate	Total votes	% of total votes
(incumbent)Yvan Forand	193	54.67
Ginette Roy	160	45.33
Total Valid Votes	353	100

2005 Brigham election, Councillor, District Four
Candidate	Total votes	% of total votes
(incumbent)Réjean Racine	accl.	.

2005 Brigham election, Councillor, District Five
Candidate	Total votes	% of total votes
(incumbent)Marc Labrecque	accl.	.

2005 Brigham election, Councillor, District Six
Candidate	Total votes	% of total votes
(incumbent)Normand Delisle	accl.	.

Source: "Meet your new municipal councils," Sherbrooke Record, 8 November 2005, p. 7.
