= Stanbridge Station =

- Municipality
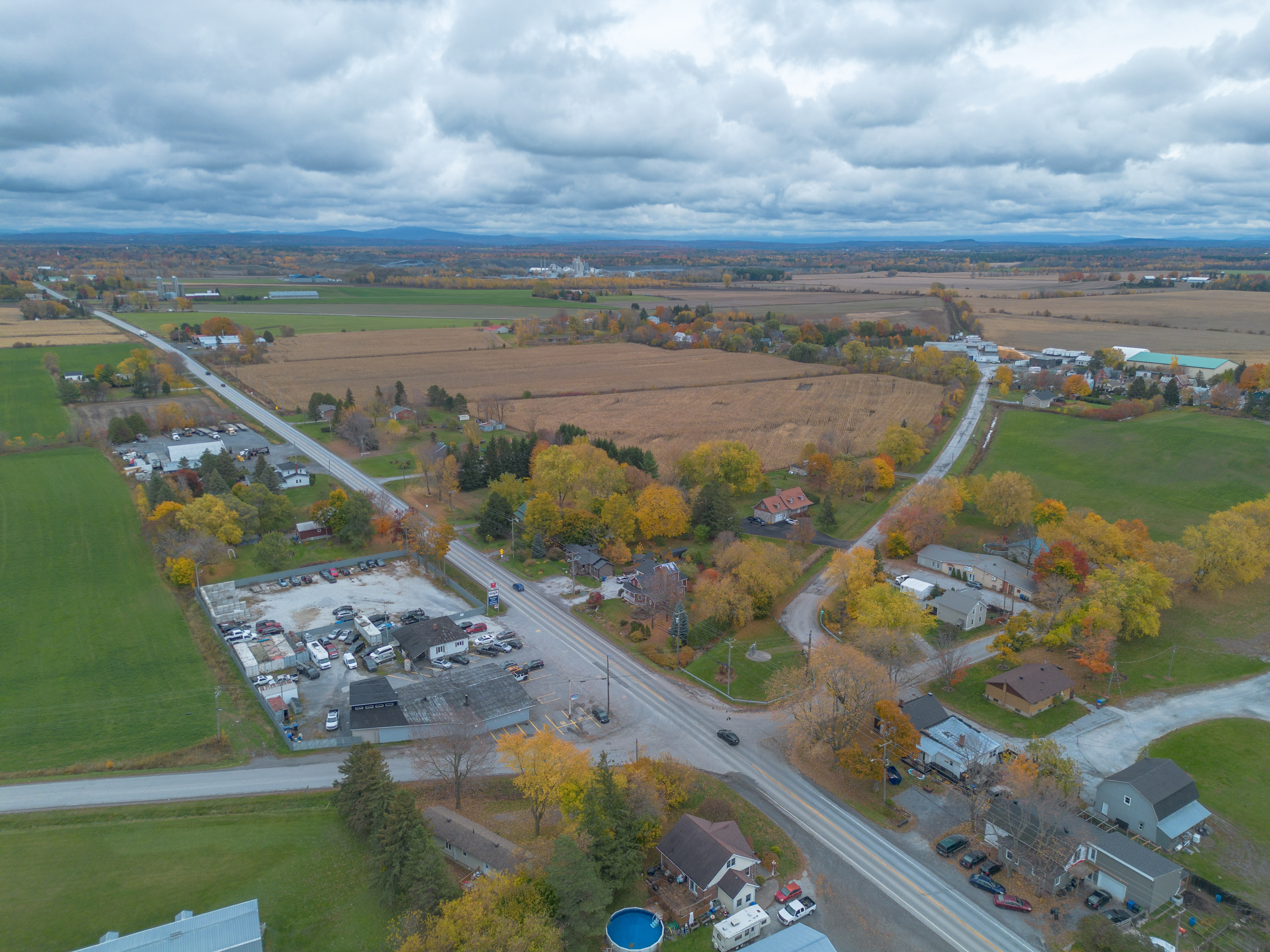
- Stanbridge Station in 2025

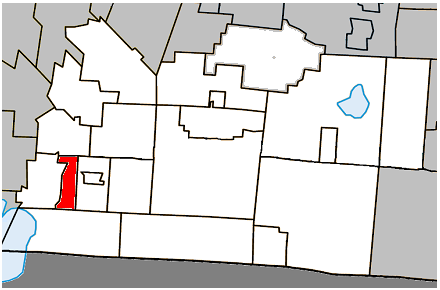
- Location within Brome-Missisquoi RCM.

- Location in southern Quebec.
- Coordinates: 45°07′N 73°02′W
- Country: Canada
- Province: Quebec
- Region: Estrie
- RCM: Brome-Missisquoi
- Constituted: March 21, 1889

Government
  - Mayor: Gilles Rioux
  - Federal riding: Brome—Missisquoi
  - Prov. riding: Brome-Missisquoi

Area
  - Total: 18.20 km^{2} (7.03 sq mi)
  - Land: 18.54 km^{2} (7.16 sq mi)
- There is an apparent contradiction between two authoritative sources

Population (2011)
  - Total: 276
  - Density: 14.9/km^{2} (39/sq mi)
  - Pop 2006-2011: ▼10.7%
  - Dwellings: 123
- Time zone: UTC−5 (EST)
  - Summer (DST): UTC−4 (EDT)
- Postal code(s): J0J 2J0
- Area codes: 450 and 579
- Highways: R-202
- Website: www.stanbridge-station.ca

Stanbridge Station is a municipality in the Canadian province of Quebec, located within the Brome-Missisquoi Regional County Municipality. The population as of the Canada 2011 Census was 276.

== Demographics ==
=== Population ===
Population trend:

Census	Population	Change (%)
2011	276	▼10.7%
2006	309	▼13.7%
2001	358	▼1.4%
1996	363	▼0.3%
1991	364	N/A

=== Language ===
Mother tongue language (2006)

Language	Population	Pct (%)
French only	190	64.41%
English only	105	35.59%
Both English and French	0	0.00%
Other languages	0	0.00%

== See also ==
- Official website of the municipality of Stanbridge-Station
- List of anglophone communities in Quebec
- List of municipalities in Quebec
