= Bedford, Quebec (township) =

Bedford
- Township municipality
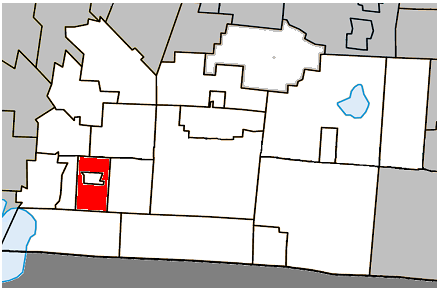
- Location within Brome-Missisquoi RCM.

- Location in southern Quebec.
- Coordinates: 45°08′N 72°58′W
- Country: Canada
- Province: Quebec
- Region: Estrie
- RCM: Brome-Missisquoi
- Constituted: March 4, 1919

Government
  - Mayor: Gilles St-Jean
  - Federal riding: Brome—Missisquoi
  - Prov. riding: Brome-Missisquoi

Area
  - Total: 32.30 km^{2} (12.47 sq mi)
  - Land: 31.56 km^{2} (12.19 sq mi)

Population (2011)
  - Total: 699
  - Density: 22.1/km^{2} (57/sq mi)
  - Dwellings: 285
- Time zone: UTC−5 (EST)
  - Summer (DST): UTC−4 (EDT)
- Postal code(s): J0J 1A0
- Area codes: 450 and 579
- Access Routes: R-202; R-235

Bedford is a township municipality in the Canadian province of Quebec, located within the Brome-Missisquoi Regional County Municipality. The population as of the Canada 2011 Census was 699.

== Demographics ==
In the 2021 Census of Population conducted by Statistics Canada, Bedford had a population of 658 living in 273 of its 282 total private dwellings, a change of −4.2% from its 2016 population of 687. With a land area of 31.96 km^{2} (12.34 sq mi), it had a population density of 20.6/km^{2} (53.3/sq mi) in 2021.

Population trend:

| Census | Population | Change (%) |
|---|---|---|
| 2011 | 699 | ▼5.0% |
| 2006 | 736 | ▼9.5% |
| 2001 | 813 | ▲1.8% |
| 1996 | 799 | ▲0.8% |
| 1991 | 793 | N/A |

Mother tongue language (2006)

| Language | Population | Pct (%) |
|---|---|---|
| French only | 465 | 65.49% |
| English only | 210 | 29.58% |
| Both English and French | 0 | 0.00% |
| Other languages | 35 | 4.93% |

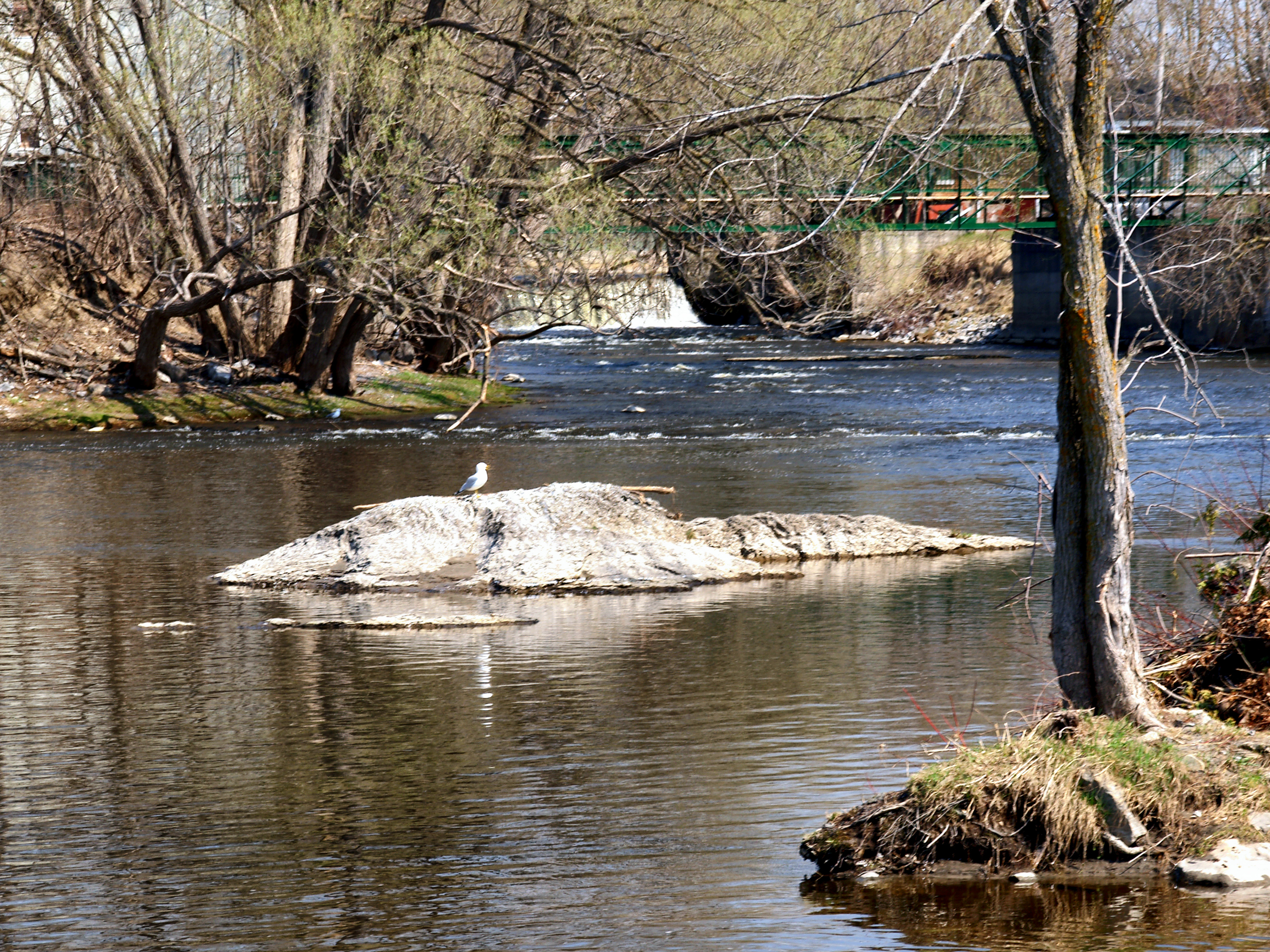
The river aux Brochets at Bedford

== See also ==
- List of anglophone communities in Quebec
- List of township municipalities in Quebec
