= Saint-Ignace-de-Stanbridge =

- Municipality
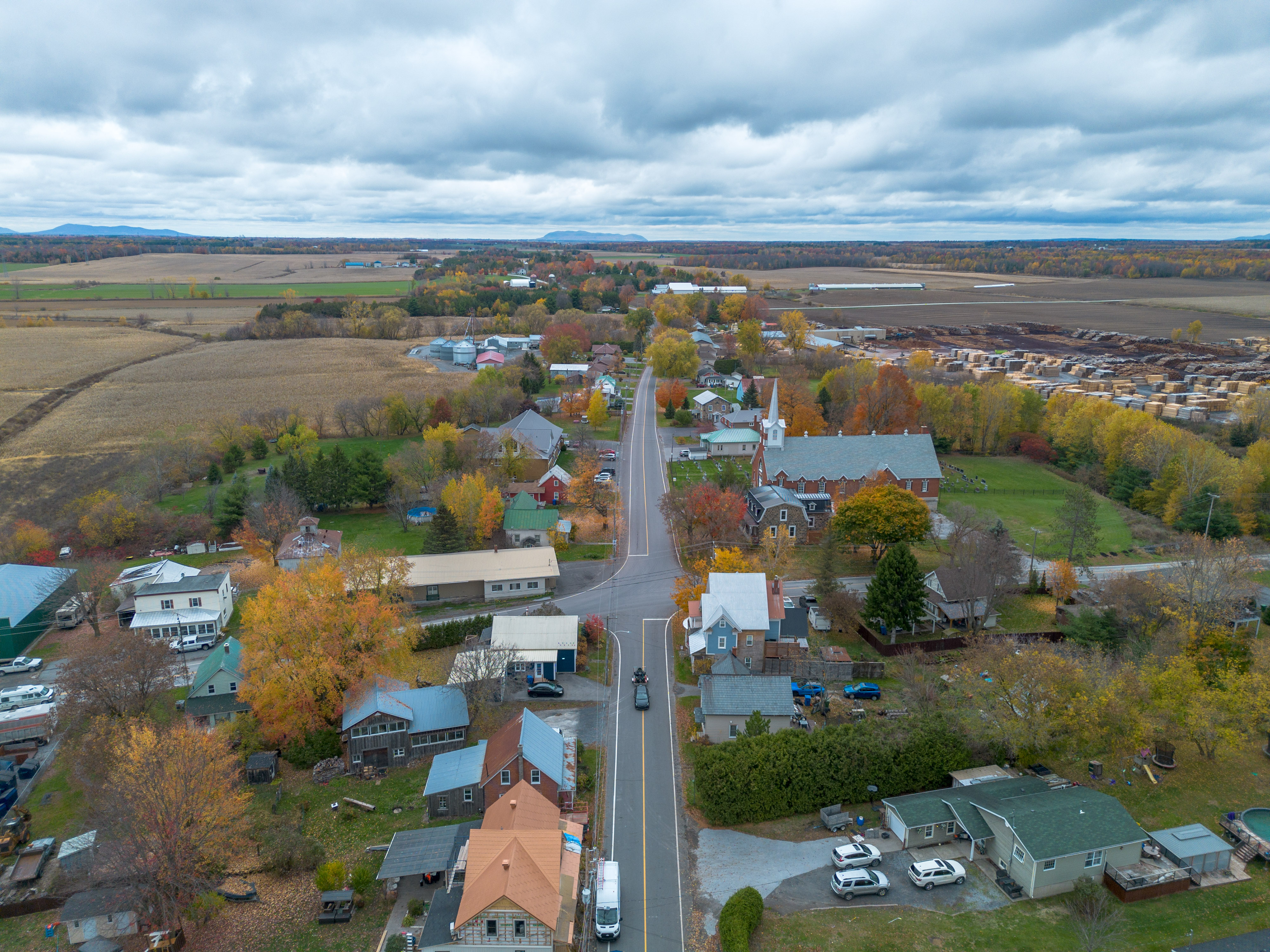
- Saint-Ignace-de-Stanbridge in 2025

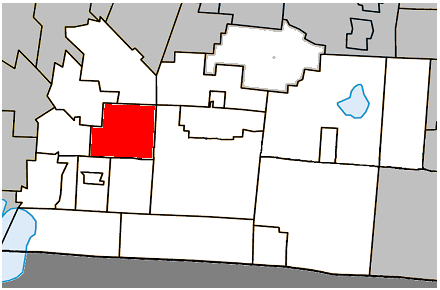
- Location within Brome-Missisquoi RCM

- Location in southern Quebec
- Coordinates: 45°10′N 72°57′W
- Country: Canada
- Province: Quebec
- Region: Estrie
- RCM: Brome-Missisquoi
- Constituted: March 21, 1889

Government
  - Mayor: Albert Santerre
  - Federal riding: Brome—Missisquoi
  - Prov. riding: Brome-Missisquoi

Area
  - Total: 69.90 km^{2} (26.99 sq mi)
  - Land: 69.16 km^{2} (26.70 sq mi)

Population (2011)
  - Total: 638
  - Density: 9.2/km^{2} (24/sq mi)
  - Pop 2006-2011: ▲1.1%
  - Dwellings: 256
- Time zone: UTC−5 (EST)
  - Summer (DST): UTC−4 (EDT)
- Postal code(s): J0J 1Y0
- Area codes: 450 and 579
- Highways: R-235
- Website: www.saint-ignace-de-stanbridge.com

Saint-Ignace-de-Stanbridge is a municipality in the Canadian province of Quebec, located within the Brome-Missisquoi Regional County Municipality. The population as of the Canada 2011 Census was 638.

== Demographics ==
=== Population ===
Population trend:

Census	Population	Change (%)
2011	638	▲1.1%
2006	631	▼7.1%
2001	679	▼1.9%
1996	692	▼3.5%
1991	717	N/A

=== Language ===
Mother tongue language (2006)

Language	Population	Pct (%)
French only	505	81.45%
English only	95	15.32%
Both English and French	0	0.00%
Other languages	20	3.23%

== See also ==
- List of anglophone communities in Quebec
- List of municipalities in Quebec
