= Sainte-Christine, Quebec =

Sainte-Christine
- Parish municipality
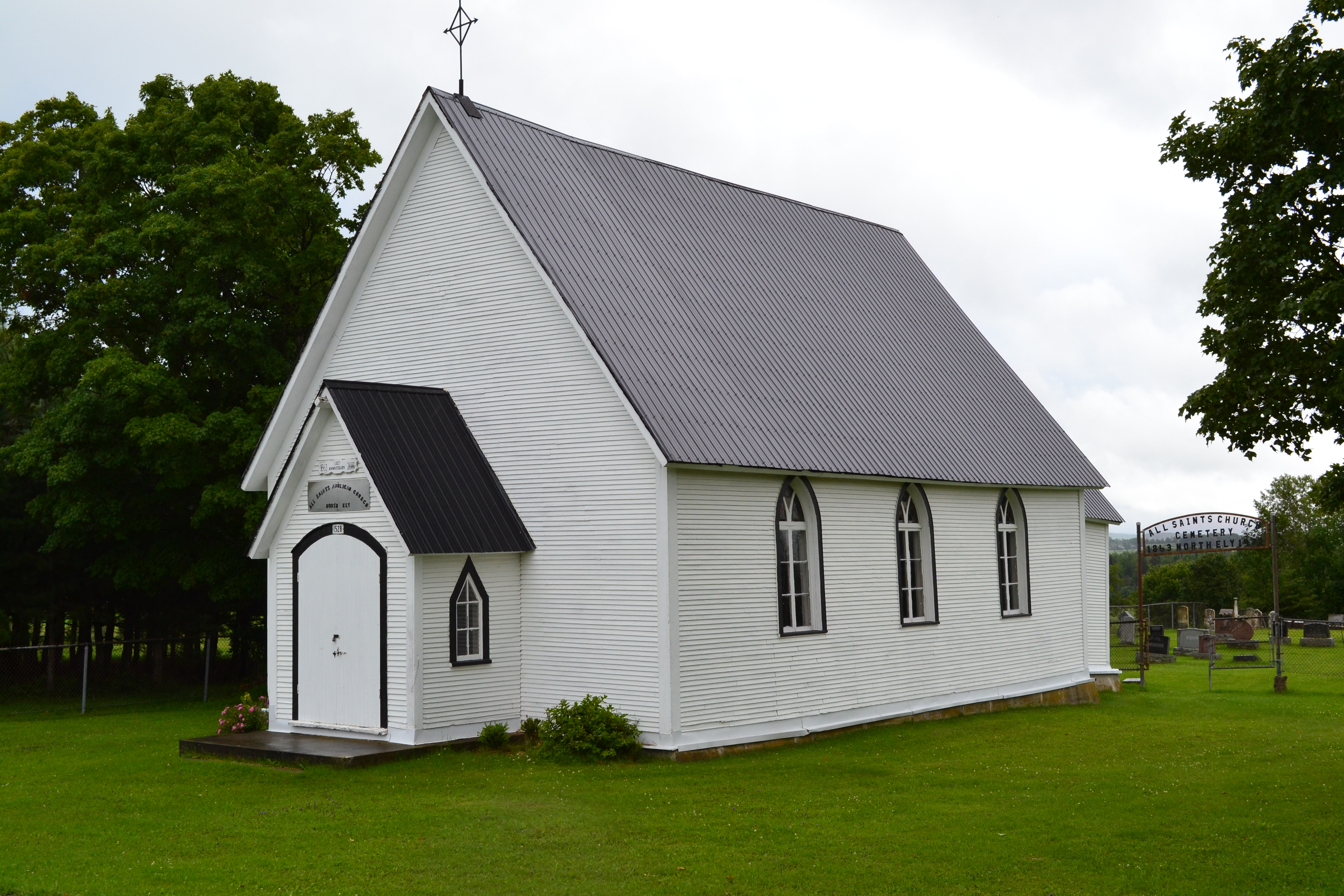

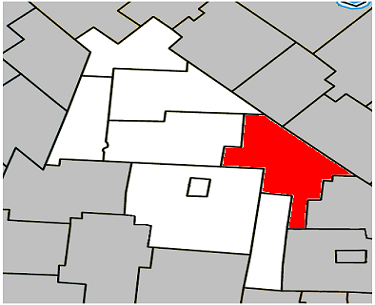
- Location within Acton RCM

- Location in southern Quebec
- Coordinates: 45°37′N 72°25′W
- Country: Canada
- Province: Quebec
- Region: Montérégie
- RCM: Acton
- Constituted: January 8, 1894

Government
  - Mayor: Jean-Marc Ménard
  - Federal riding: Saint-Hyacinthe—Bagot—Acton
  - Prov. riding: Daniel-Johnson

Area
  - Total: 91.80 km^{2} (35.44 sq mi)
  - Land: 92.16 km^{2} (35.58 sq mi)
- There is an apparent contradiction between two authoritative sources.

Population (2016)
  - Total: 730
  - Density: 7.9/km^{2} (20/sq mi)
  - Pop 2011-2016: ▲8.5%
  - Dwellings: 334
- Time zone: UTC−5 (EST)
  - Summer (DST): UTC−4 (EDT)
- Postal code(s): J0H 1H0
- Area code: 819
- Highways: R-116; R-222
- Website: ste-christine.com

Sainte-Christine (French pronunciation: [sɛ̃t kʁistin]) is a parish municipality in Acton Regional County Municipality, in the province of Quebec, Canada. The population as of the Canada 2016 Census was 730.

== Demographics ==
In the 2021 Census of Population conducted by Statistics Canada, Sainte-Christine had a population of 772 living in 313 of its 341 total private dwellings, a change of 5.8% from its 2016 population of 730. With a land area of 92.12 km^{2} (35.57 sq mi), it had a population density of 8.4/km^{2} (21.7/sq mi) in 2021.

Population trend:

Census	Population	Change (%)
2016	730	▲8.5%
2011	673	▼12.9%
2006	773 (R)	▲2.5%
2001	754	▼5.4%
1996	797	▲7.8%
1991	739	N/A

(R) Revised count - Statistics Canada - February 10, 2009.

Mother tongue language (2006)

Language	Population	Pct (%)
French only	555	100.00%
English only	0	0.00%
Both English and French	0	0.00%
Other languages	0	0.00%

== See also ==
- List of parish municipalities in Quebec
