= Downtown Richford Historic District =

Historic district in Vermont, United States

- U.S. National Register of Historic Places
- U.S. Historic district
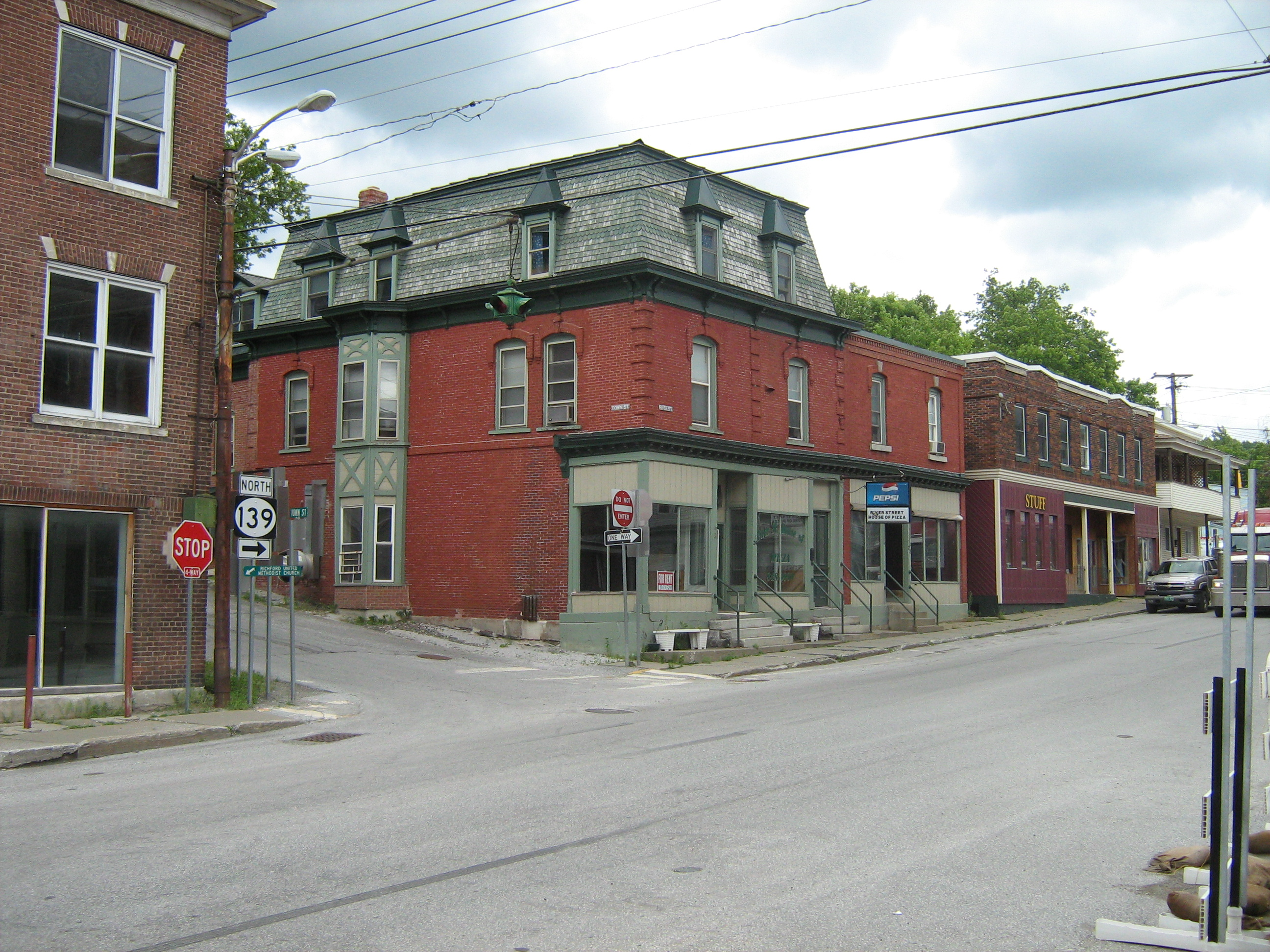

- Location within Vermont Location within the United States
- Location: Main and River Sts., Richford, Vermont
- Coordinates: 44°59′47″N 72°40′19″W
- Area: 12 acres (4.9 ha)
- Architectural style: Italianate, Queen Anne
- NRHP reference No.: 80000333
- Added to NRHP: August 22, 1980

The Downtown Richford Historic District encompasses a cluster of commercial and industrial buildings at the center of Richford, Vermont. Centered on the junction of Main and River Streets are a cluster of mainly brick buildings, built between 1880 and 1920, with several industrial properties just across the Missisquoi River to the south, whose waters provided the power for the industries that fueled the town's growth. The district was listed on the National Register of Historic Places in 1980.

== Description and history ==
The northern Vermont town of Richford developed in the late 1790s around a series of falls on the upper Missisquoi River, where its early settlers built sawmills and gristmills. In the 1850s it developed as a regional commercial and industrial center, spurred by tariff reductions for trade with neighboring Quebec, which brought a market for area goods and an influx of French-speaking immigrants. The mills were located primarily on the south side of the falls, powered by a water diverted into a raceway east of the area, and the town's commercial center grew on the north side of the falls. The area declined economically after World War I, and has remained at a reduced level of economic activity since.

The historic district encompasses both commercial and industrial buildings arranged on either side of the Missisquoi River, which Main Street crosses on a 1928 pony truss bridge, built after the previous crossing was washed away in 1927. From the junction of Main and River Streets, brick commercial buildings extend east and west on the south side of River Street, and on the north side west of the junction. These were almost all built between 1880 and 1920, and are in typical commercial variants of Italianate and Queen Anne styling. South of the river, on the west side of Main Street, stand two industrial buildings, built in 1908 out of concrete blocks by the Sweat-Comings Company, and the adjacent fire station, built by town but also out of concrete blocks.

== See also ==
- National Register of Historic Places listings in Franklin County, Vermont
