= Upton, Quebec =

Upton
- Municipality
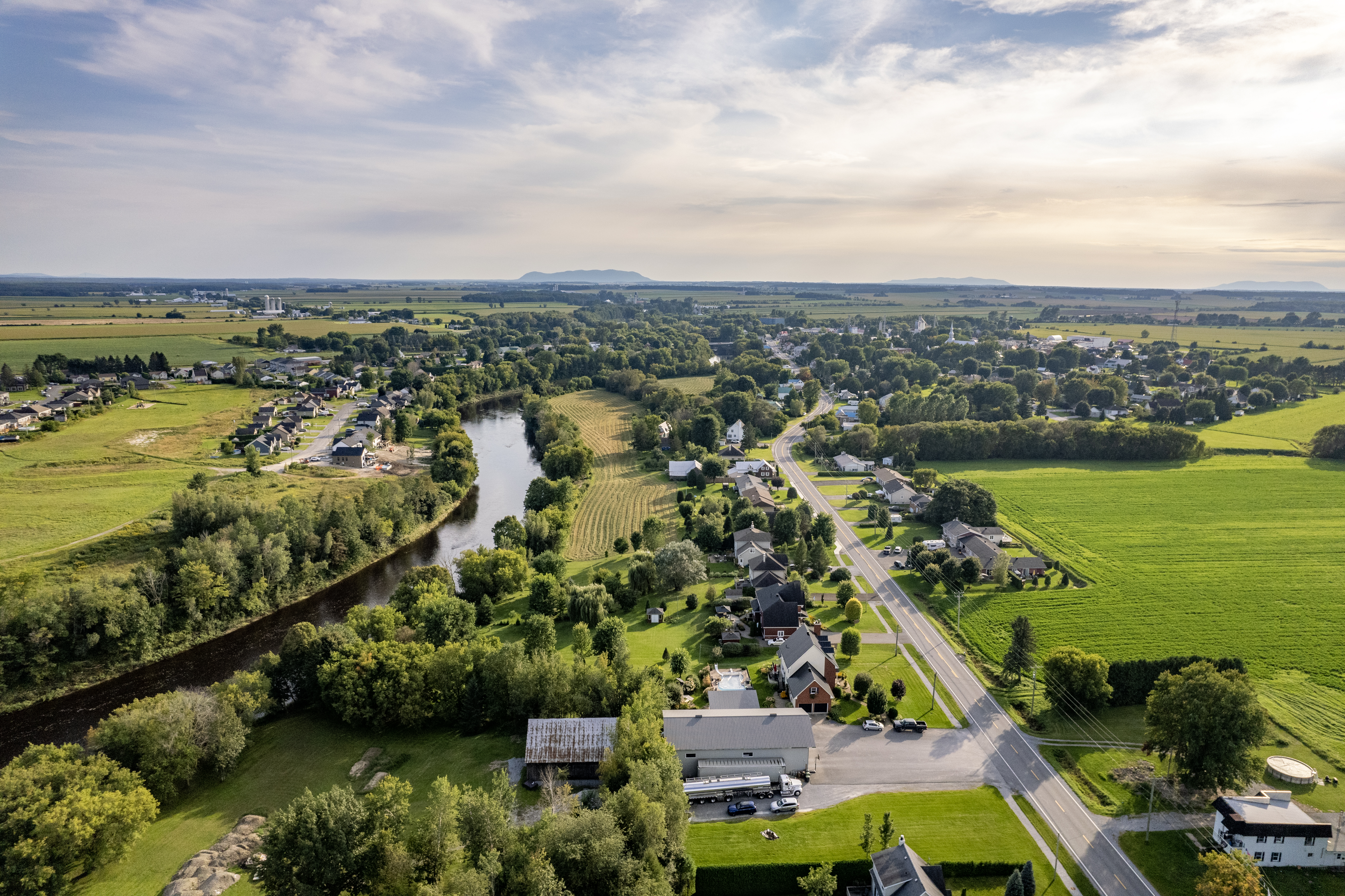
- Aerial view of Upton
- Motto: Unis Pour Grandir
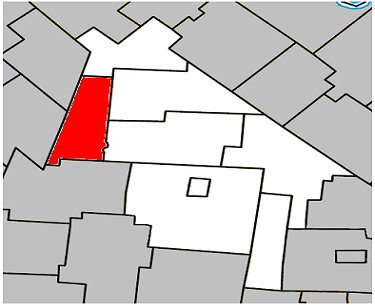
- Location within Acton RCM

- Location in southern Quebec
- Coordinates: 45°39′N 72°41′W
- Country: Canada
- Province: Quebec
- Region: Montérégie
- RCM: Acton
- Constituted: February 25, 1998

Government
  - Mayor: Robert Leclerc
  - Federal riding: Saint-Hyacinthe—Bagot—Acton
  - Prov. riding: Daniel-Johnson

Area
  - Total: 55.90 km^{2} (21.58 sq mi)
  - Land: 55.64 km^{2} (21.48 sq mi)

Population (2011)
  - Total: 2,075
  - Density: 37.3/km^{2} (97/sq mi)
  - Pop 2006-2011: ▲6.2%
  - Dwellings: 900
- Time zone: UTC−5 (EST)
  - Summer (DST): UTC−4 (EDT)
- Postal code(s): J0H 2E0
- Area codes: 450 and 579
- Highways: R-116; R-211
- Website: www.upton.ca

Upton (French pronunciation: [ɔptɔn]) is a municipality in the Regional County Municipality of Acton, in the province of Quebec, Canada. The population as of the Canada 2011 Census was 2,075.

== Demographics ==
=== Population ===
Population trend:

| Census | Population | Change (%) |
|---|---|---|
| 2011 | 2,075 | ▲6.2% |
| 2006 | 1,954 | ▼0.3% |
| 2001 | 1,986 | ▲3.0% |
| Merger | 1,928 (+) | ▲44.5% |
| 1996 | 1,070 | ▲14.6% |
| 1991 | 934 | N/A |

(+) Amalgamation of the Parish of Saint-Éphrem-d’Upton and the Village of Upton on February 25, 1998.

=== Language ===
Mother tongue language (2006)

| Language | Population | Pct (%) |
|---|---|---|
| French only | 1,875 | 96.65% |
| English only | 0 | 0.00% |
| Both English and French | 0 | 0.00% |
| Other languages | 65 | 3.35% |

== See also ==
- List of municipalities in Quebec
- 20th-century municipal history of Quebec
