= Richford, Vermont =

- Town
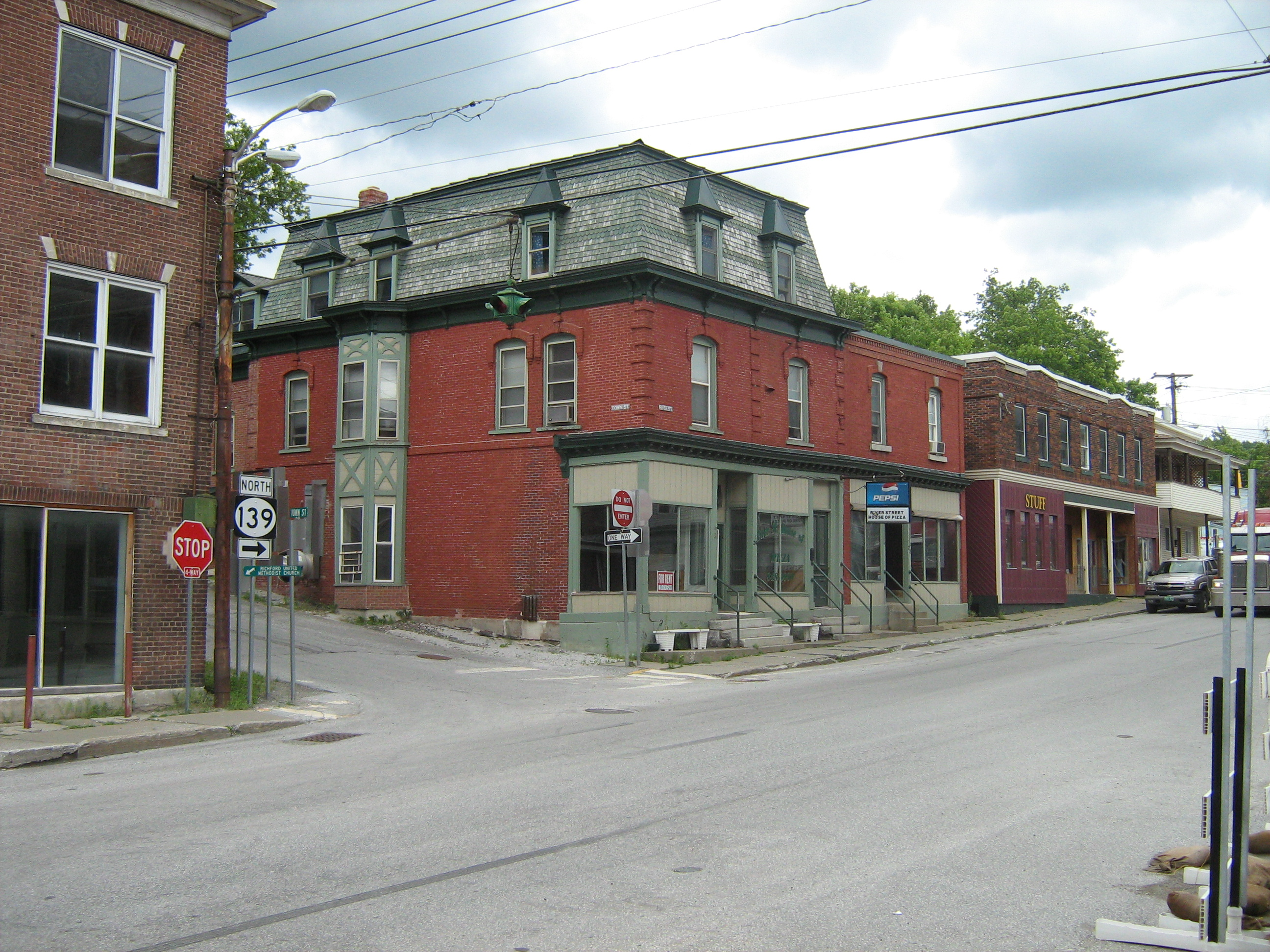
- Downtown Richford

- Location in Franklin County and the state of Vermont
- Coordinates: 44°58′28″N 72°37′52″W
- Country: United States
- State: Vermont
- County: Franklin
- Communities: Richford; East Richford; South Richford; Stevens Mills

Area
  - Total: 43.3 sq mi (112.1 km^{2})
  - Land: 43.0 sq mi (111.4 km^{2})
  - Water: 0.27 sq mi (0.7 km^{2})
- Elevation: 1,161 ft (354 m)

Population (2020)
  - Total: 2,346
  - Density: 55/sq mi (21.1/km^{2})
- Time zone: UTC-5 (Eastern (EST))
  - Summer (DST): UTC-4 (EDT)
- ZIP code: 05476
- Area code: 802
- FIPS code: 50-59125
- GNIS feature ID: 1462185
- Website: richfordvt.org

Richford is a town in Franklin County, Vermont, United States, located along the Canada–United States border. The population was 2,346 at the 2020 census.

Richford is the birthplace of R. G. LeTourneau, an industrialist who founded LeTourneau University in Longview, Texas.

Richford is the eastern terminus of the Missisquoi Valley Rail-Trail.

== Geography ==
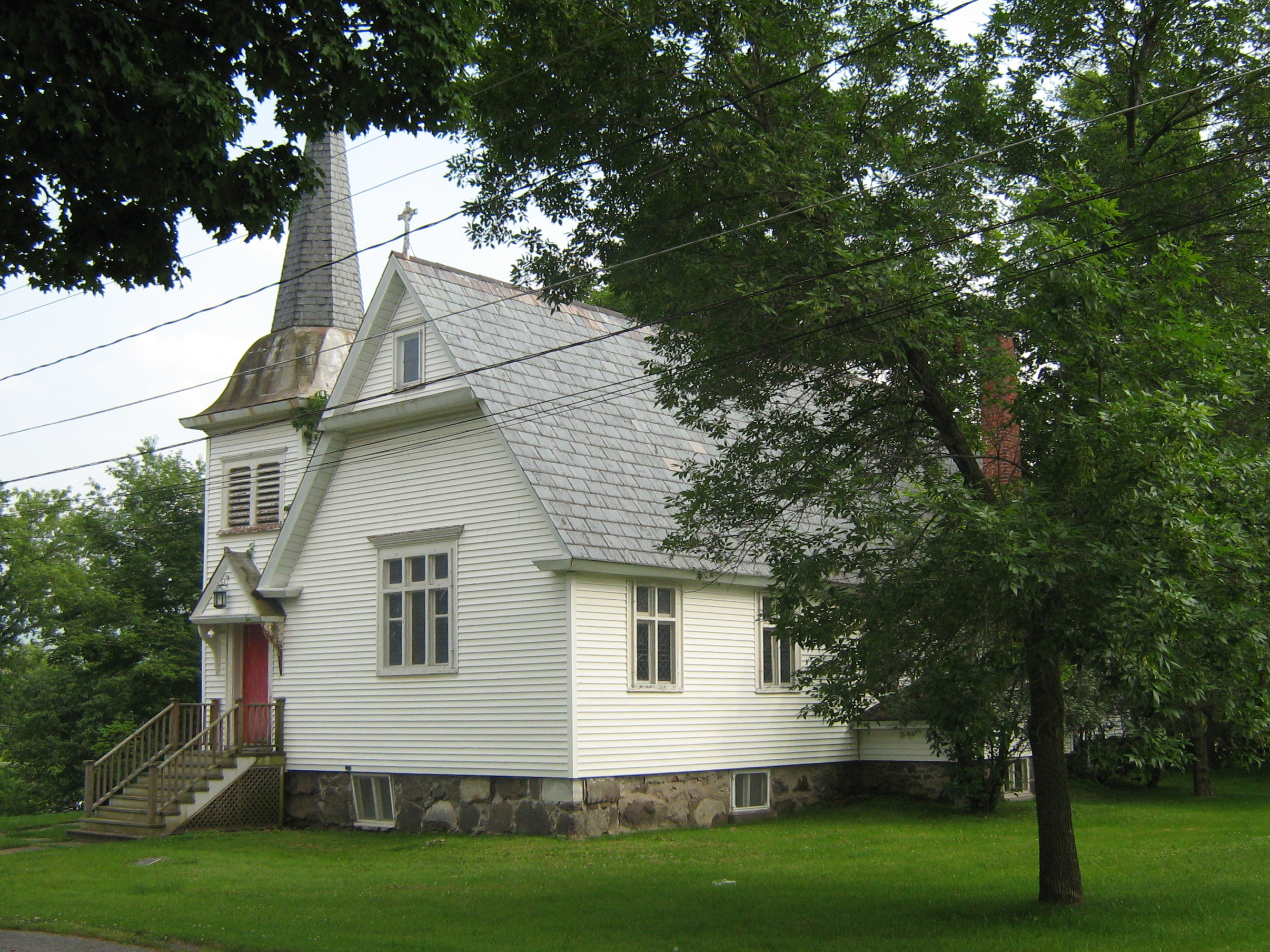
St. Ann's Episcopal Church

Richford is located in the northeastern corner of Franklin County, bordered to the north by the Brome-Missisquoi Regional County Municipality in the Montérégie region of Quebec, Canada. Orleans County is to the east. Richford, the primary community, is in the northwestern part of the town along the Missisquoi River. Vermont Route 105 passes through the center of town, leading east across the Green Mountains to North Troy and southwest to Enosburg Falls. Vermont Route 139 leads north from the center of Richford 1.5 miles (2.4 km) to the international border.

According to the United States Census Bureau, the town has a total area of 43.3 square miles (112.1 km^{2}), of which 43.0 square miles (111.4 km^{2}) is land and 0.3 square miles (0.7 km^{2}), or 0.61%, is water. The Missisquoi River enters from Canada and exits to the south; there are no significant lakes or ponds.

=== Surrounding areas ===
- North: Quebec, Canada: East Pinnacle, Abercorn, Glen Sutton, Alva, Domaine Mont Louis, Sutton
- East: Jay
- Southeast: Westfield
- South: Montgomery
- Southwest: Enosburgh
- West: Berkshire

== History ==
On October 8, 1908, a grain elevator owned by the Canadian Pacific Railway exploded, killing thirteen people.

== Government ==
The Essex-Orleans Senate district includes the town of Richford, as well as parts or all of Essex County, Orleans County, Franklin County and Lamoille County. It is represented in the Vermont Senate by Vincent Illuzzi (R) and Samuel Douglass (R).

== Demographics ==
Historical population
Census	Pop.	Note	%±
1800	113		—
1810	440		289.4%
1820	440		0.0%
1830	704		60.0%
1840	914		29.8%
1850	1,074		17.5%
1860	1,338		24.6%
1870	1,481		10.7%
1880	1,818		22.8%
1890	2,196		20.8%
1900	2,421		10.2%
1910	2,907		20.1%
1920	2,842		−2.2%
1930	2,544		−10.5%
1940	2,646		4.0%
1950	2,643		−0.1%
1960	2,316		−12.4%
1970	2,116		−8.6%
1980	2,206		4.3%
1990	2,178		−1.3%
2000	2,321		6.6%
2010	2,308		−0.6%
2020	2,346		1.6%
U.S. Decennial Census

As of the census of 2000, there were 2,321 people, 899 households, and 613 families residing in the town. The population density was 53.7 people per square mile (20.7/km^{2}). There were 1,017 housing units at an average density of 23.5 per square mile (9.1/km^{2}). The racial makeup of the town was 97.72% White, 0.34% African American, 0.95% Native American, 0.04% Asian, 0.17% from other races, and 0.78% from two or more races. Hispanic or Latino of any race were 0.69% of the population.

There were 899 households, out of which 32.5% had children under the age of 18 living with them, 51.7% were married couples living together, 11.3% had a female householder with no husband present, and 31.8% were non-families. 25.7% of all households were made up of individuals, and 12.3% had someone living alone who was 65 years of age or older. The average household size was 2.53 and the average family size was 2.98.

In the town, the population was spread out, with 25.9% under the age of 18, 7.6% from 18 to 24, 27.2% from 25 to 44, 22.2% from 45 to 64, and 17.1% who were 65 years of age or older. The median age was 38 years. For every 100 females, there were 93.6 males. For every 100 women age 18 and over, there were 90.2 men.

The median income for a household in the town was $28,125, and the median income for a family was $32,016. Males had a median income of $26,607 versus $20,731 for females. The per capita income for the town was $14,368. About 16.9% of families and 21.0% of the population were below the poverty line, including 30.6% of those under age 18 and 14.4% of those age 65 or over.

== National Register of Historic Places ==
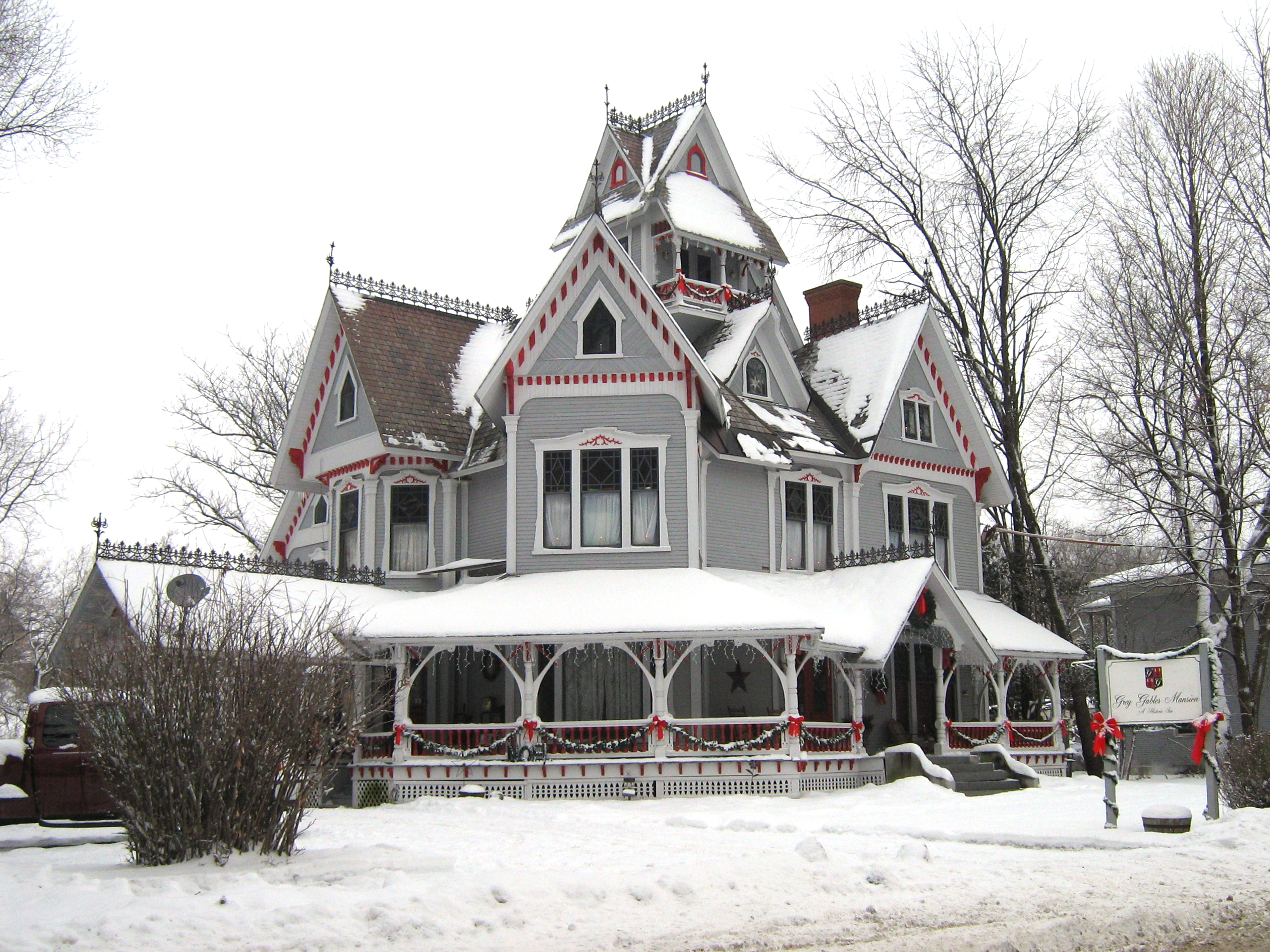
Sheldon Boright House, now Grey Gables Mansion B&B

Several buildings and structures are listed on the National Register of Historic Places, including St. Ann's Episcopal Church, the Sheldon Boright House, the F.W. Wheeler House, the Richford Primary School, the Missisquoi River Bridge, and the Downtown Richford Historic District.

== Notable people ==
- John Blaisdell Corliss, U.S. congressman from Michigan
- E. Henry Powell, state auditor
- Max L. Powell, President of the Vermont State Senate
- Percival L. Shangraw, Chief Justice of the Vermont Supreme Court

== See also ==
- North Branch Missisquoi River, designated Rivière Sutton in Quebec
- Missisquoi River
