= Brome-Missisquoi Regional County Municipality =

Brome-Missisquoi
- Regional county municipality
- Location in province of Quebec
- Coordinates: 45°08′N 72°48′W
- Country: Canada
- Province: Quebec
- Region: Estrie
- Effective: January 1, 2010
- County seat: Cowansville

Government
  - Type: Prefecture
  - Prefect: Arthur Fauteux

Area
  - Total: 1,685.90 km^{2} (650.93 sq mi)
  - Land: 1,650.20 km^{2} (637.15 sq mi)

Population (2021)
  - Total: 64,786
  - Density: 39.3/km^{2} (102/sq mi)
  - Change 2016-2021: ▲11.1%
  - Dwellings: 34,331
- Time zone: UTC−5 (EST)
  - Summer (DST): UTC−4 (EDT)
- Area codes: 450 and 579
- Website: www.brome-missisquoi.ca

Brome-Missisquoi (French pronunciation: [bʁɔm misiskwa]) is a regional county municipality in the Estrie region of Quebec, Canada. It lies in the Eastern Townships area. The seat is Cowansville. In 2021, it was transferred to the Estrie region from Montérégie.

In Parliament it is covered by the Brome—Missisquoi federal electoral district.

== History ==
In the 1980s, the RCM was formed from municipalities of historic Brome and Missisquoi counties. On January 1, 2010, the city of Bromont moved from La Haute-Yamaska Regional County Municipality to Brome-Missisquoi.

== Subdivisions ==
There are 21 subdivisions within the RCM:

Cities & towns (7)

- Bedford
- Bromont
- Cowansville
- Dunham
- Farnham
- Lac-Brome
- Sutton

Municipalities (11)

- Bolton-Ouest
- Brigham
- East Farnham
- Frelighsburg
- Notre-Dame-de-Stanbridge
- Pike River
- Saint-Armand
- Saint-Ignace-de-Stanbridge
- Sainte-Sabine
- Stanbridge East
- Stanbridge Station

Townships (1)

- Bedford

Villages (2)

- Abercorn
- Brome

Name	Votes	Population	Area (km^2)
Abercorn	1	341	26.72
Bedford (Town)	1	2,558	4.23
Bedford (Township)	1	658	31.96
Bolton-Ouest	1	732	100.94
Brigham	1	2,282	86.92
Brome	1	341	11.56
Bromont	6	11,357	114.05
Cowansville	8	15,234	46.87
Dunham	2	3,599	193.86
East-Farnham	1	612	5.02
Farnham	5	10,149	92.12
Frelighsburg	1	1,123	123.31
Lac-Brome	3	5,923	206.9
Notre-Dame-de-Stanbridge	1	691	43.89
Pike-River	1	503	40.77
Saint-Armand	1	1,228	83.16
Sainte-Sabine	1	1,105	55.33
Saint-Ignace-de-Stanbridge	1	677	69.42
Stanbridge East	1	834	49.41
Stanbridge Station	1	291	18.07
Sutton	2	4,548	245.69
Total	41	64,786	1650.20

== Demographics ==
=== Population ===
Canada census – Brome-Missisquoi Regional County Municipality, Quebec community profile

	2021	2016	2011
Population	64,786 (+11.1% from 2016)	58,314 (+4.8% from 2011)	55,621 (+5.4% from 2006)
Land area	1,650.20 km^{2} (637.15 sq mi)	1,652.08 km^{2} (637.87 sq mi)	1,651.73 km^{2} (637.74 sq mi)
Population density	39.3/km^{2} (102/sq mi)	35.3/km^{2} (91/sq mi)	33.7/km^{2} (87/sq mi)
Median age	49.6 (M: 48.8, F: 50.4)	48.4 (M: 47.4, F: 49.4)	46.5 (M: 45.8, F: 47.2)
Private dwellings	34,331 (total) 29,414 (occupied)	31,470 (total)	29,296 (total)
Median household income	$71,500	$57,801	$50,670

References: 2021 2016 2011

Historical census data - Brome-Missisquoi Regional County Municipality, Quebec

Year	Pop.	±%
1991	45,257	—
1996	45,987	+1.6%
2001	46,165	+0.4%

Year	Pop.	±%
2006	46,720	+1.2%
2010A	52,769	+12.9%
2011	55,621	+5.4%

Year	Pop.	±%
2016	58,314	+4.8%
2021	64,786	+11.1%

, 2021
(A) adjustment due to boundary change.

=== Language ===
Canada Census mother tongue - Brome-Missisquoi Regional County Municipality, Quebec
Census	Total	French			English			French & English			Other		
Year	Responses	Count	Trend	Pop %	Count	Trend	Pop %	Count	Trend	Pop %	Count	Trend	Pop %
2021	63,560	50,310	▲12.2%	79.04%	9,885	▲0.97%	15.55%	1,585	▲82.18%	2.49%	1,490	▲12.03%	2.34%
2016	56,955	44,820	▲71.2%	78.69%	9,790	▼4.4%	17.02%	870	▲3.57%	1.53%	1,330	▲5.5%	2.33%
2011	54,590	42,240	▲25.9%	77.38%	10,250	▲4.2%	18.78%	840	▲18.3%	1.54%	1,260	▼2.7%	2.31%
2006	45,400	33,560	▲1.8%	73.92%	9,835	▼2.8%	21.66%	710	▼4.7%	1.56%	1,295	▲30.8%	2.85%
2001	44,830	32,975	▲2.7%	73.56%	10,120	▼6.1%	22.57%	745	▲4.9%	1.66%	990	▲11.2%	2.21%
1996	44,485	32,105	n/a	72.17%	10,780	n/a	24.23%	710	n/a	1.60%	890	n/a	2.00%

== Highways ==
Highways and numbered routes that run through the municipality, including external routes that start or finish at the county border:

- Autoroutes
  - A-10
  - A-35 (planned)
- Principal highways
  - R-104
  - R-133
  - R-139
- Secondary highways
  - R-202
  - R-213
  - R-215
  - R-233
  - R-235
  - R-237
  - R-241
  - R-243
- External routes
  - I-89
  - VT 108
  - VT 139

== See also ==
- List of regional county municipalities and equivalent territories in Quebec
