= Abercorn, Quebec =

Abercorn
- Village municipality
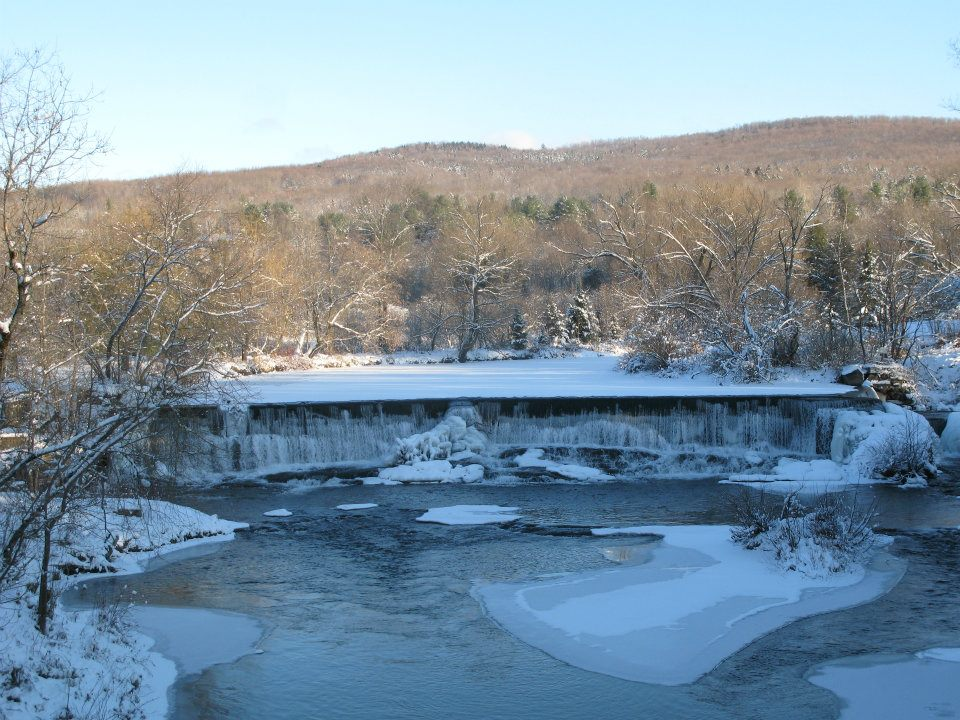
- Waterfall in the village of Abercorn, Québec

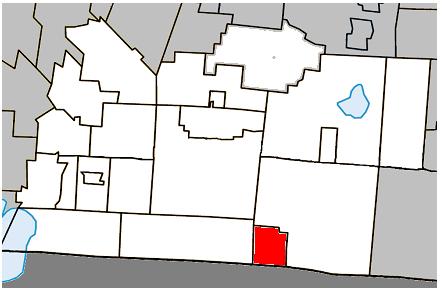
- Location within Brome-Missisquoi RCM.

- Location in southern Quebec.
- Coordinates: 45°02′N 72°40′W
- Country: Canada
- Province: Quebec
- Region: Estrie
- RCM: Brome-Missisquoi
- Historic region: Eastern Townships
- Settled: 1792
- Constituted: June 25, 1929

Government
  - Mayor: Jean Simoneau
  - Federal riding: Brome—Missisquoi
  - Prov. riding: Brome-Missisquoi

Area
  - Total: 27.00 km^{2} (10.42 sq mi)
  - Land: 26.72 km^{2} (10.32 sq mi)

Population (2021)
  - Total: 341
  - Density: 12.8/km^{2} (33/sq mi)
  - Pop 2016-2021: ▲2.1%
  - Dwellings: 236
- Time zone: UTC−5 (EST)
  - Summer (DST): UTC−4 (EDT)
- Postal code(s): J0E 1B0
- Area codes: 450 and 579
- Highways: R-139
- Census profile
- MAMROT info: 46005
- Toponymie info: 88

Abercorn is a village municipality located in the Brome-Missisquoi Regional County Municipality in the Estrie region of southern Québec, Canada. It lies on the Canada-United States border, about 10 km (6.3 mi) south of Sutton, Quebec. The municipality had a population of 341 in the 2021 Canadian census.

Abercorn covers 26.73 km² (10.32 sq mi). Sutton, Quebec lies to the north and east, Frelighsburg, Quebec to the west, and Richford, Vermont immediately across the international border to the south.

== Toponymy ==
The settlement was originally known as "Shepard's Mills", after Thomas Shepard, a settler from New Hampshire who arrived in the area in 1797. The name "Abercorn" was adopted by the local post office when it opened in 1848 and was later used for the railway station.

The origin of the name Abercorn is uncertain. According to the Commission de Toponymie du Québec, it probably refers to James Hamilton, 1st Duke of Abercorn (1811-1885), whose title derived from Abercorn, West Lothian, a village in Scotland.

== History ==
Settlement in the area began in 1792, when Thomas Spencer and Alexander Griggs established themselves near the present village. Thomas Shepard arrived several years later and built a grist mill and sawmill. The settlement subsequently became known as Shepard's Mills.

A store opened in 1820, followed by a customs house in 1845, and a post office in 1848. The settlement remained part of Sutton until 1929, when Abercorn was incorporated as a village municipality.

Union Church was built in 1870 near the centre of the settlement. It was used by Methodist, Baptist, Presbyterian and Congregationalist congregations before becoming an Anglican church and taking the name All Saints Church in the 1920s. The former church was acquired by the Centre culturel d'Abercorn in 2021 for use as a cultural and community centre.

Rail service had reached the area in 1871, with the opening of the South Eastern Counties Junction Railway through Sutton and Abercorn. Abercorn station was the last station on the Canadian side before the United States border. The railway provided the village with direct connection to Montreal and the United States.

== Geography ==
Abercorn lies in the Sutton Valley near the northern extent of the Green Mountains. Mont Pinacle rises to the west and the Sutton Mountains to the east. The Sutton River crosses the municipality, while Quebec Route 139 passes through the village and continues south to the Canada-United States border.

== Demographics ==
In the 2021 Census of Population conducted by Statistics Canada, Abercorn had a population of 341 residing in 180 of its 240 total private dwellings, a change of 2.1% from its 2016 population of 334. With a land area of 26.72 km^{2} (10.32 sq mi), it had a population density of 12.8/km^{2} (33.1/sq mi) in 2021.

Population trend:

Census	Population	Change (%)
2021	341	▲2.1%
2016	334	▼14.6%
2011	391	▲6.8%
2006	366	▲10.9%
2001	330	▼4.1%
1996	344	▲7.2%
1991	320	N/A

Mother tongue (2021)

Language	Population	Pct (%)
French	205	65.08%
English	110	34.92%

Visible minorities and Aboriginal population
Canada 2016 Census		Population	% of Total Population
Visible minority group Source:	South Asian	0	0
Visible minority group Source:	Chinese	0	0
Visible minority group Source:	Black	0	0
Visible minority group Source:	Filipino	0	0
Visible minority group Source:	Latin American	0	0
Visible minority group Source:	Southeast Asian	0	0
Visible minority group Source:	Arab	0	0
Visible minority group Source:	West Asian	0	0
Visible minority group Source:	Korean	0	0
Visible minority group Source:	Japanese	0	0
Visible minority group Source:	Mixed visible minority	0	0
Visible minority group Source:	Other visible minority	0	0
Total visible minority population		0	0
Aboriginal group Source:	First Nations	45	14.3
Aboriginal group Source:	Métis	0	0
Aboriginal group Source:	Inuit	0	0
Total Aboriginal population		45	14.3
White		270	85.7
Total population		315	100

== Government ==
List of mayors

From	To	Name	Party
1929	1939	Francis F. Fyles	Independent
1939	1941	Ernest R. Boright	Independent
1941	1943	Frank A. Sutcliffe	Independent
1943	1945	Albert Deslauriers	Independent
1945	1947	Ernest R. Boright	Independent
1947	1975	Wilfrid Thibault	Independent
1975	1976	Arthur Corbeil	Independent
1976	1984	Laurent Tremblay	Independent
1984	1988	Paul Fisette	Independent
1988	1998	Jane Beaudoin	Independent
1998	2003	Gilles Lavoie	Independent
2003	2013	Jean-Charles Bissonnette	Independent
2013	2015	Robert Nadeau	Independent
2016	2017	Jean Charles Bissonnette	Independent
2017	2022	Guy Gravel	Ensemble Pour Abercorn
2022	2025	Guy Favreau	Independent
2025	INC.	Jean Simoneau	Independent

== See also ==
- List of anglophone communities in Quebec
- List of village municipalities in Quebec
