= Quebec Route 133 =

Highway in Quebec

Route 133

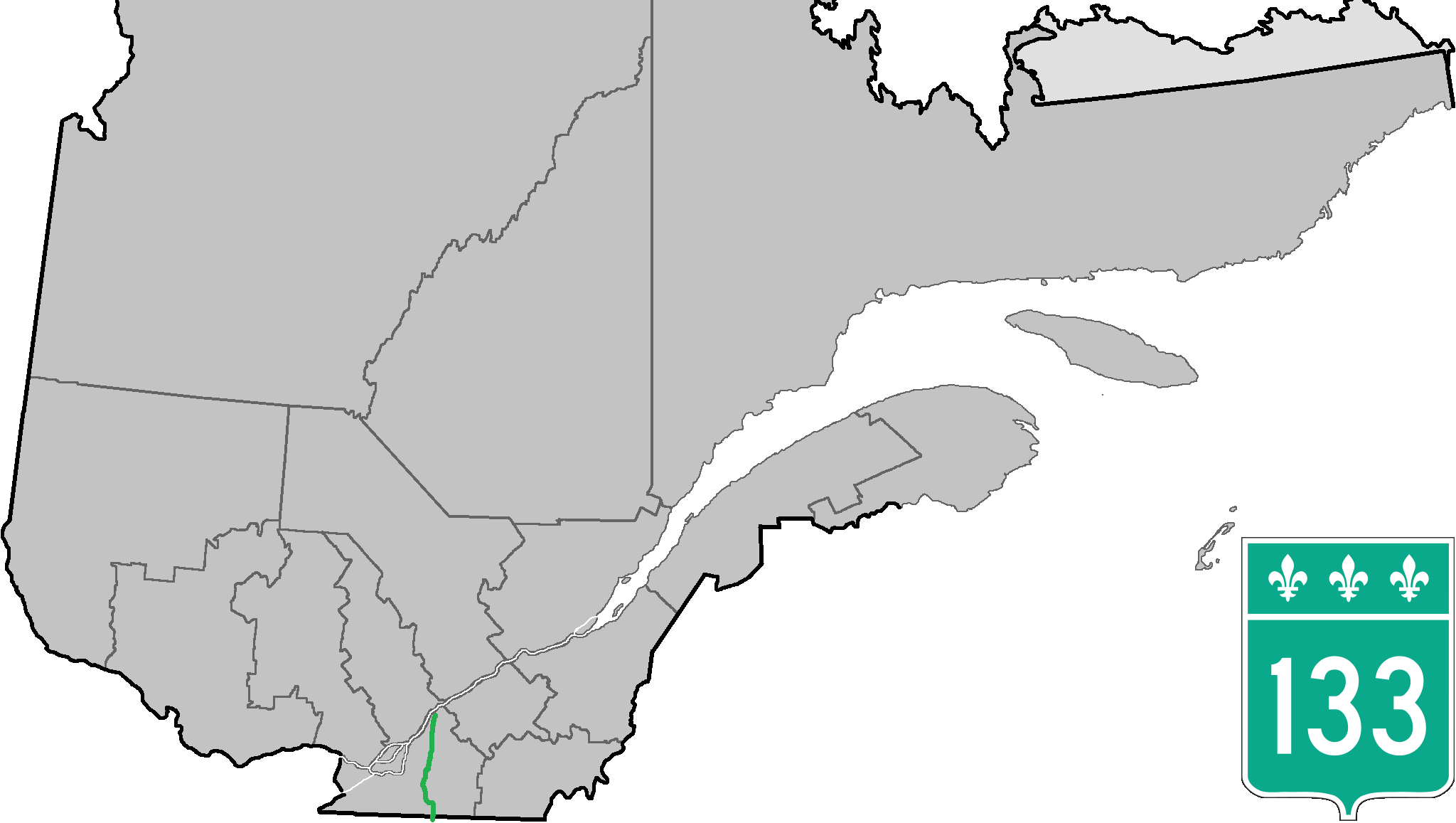

Route information
- Maintained by Transports Québec
- Length: 132.9 km (82.6 mi)
- History: Route 7 (U.S. border – Iberville); Route 21 (Iberville – Sorel)

Major junctions
- South end: I-89 at the Highgate Springs-St. Armand/Philipsburg Border Crossing in Saint-Armand
- A-35 in Saint-Armand; A-35 in Saint-Sébastien; A-35 / R-104 in Saint-Jean-sur-Richelieu; A-10 / R-112 in Richelieu; A-20 (TCH) / R-116 in Mont-Saint-Hilaire; R-137 in Saint-Denis-sur-Richelieu; A-30 / R-132 in Sorel-Tracy
- North end: Sorel-Tracy ferry terminal

Location
- Country: Canada
- Province: Quebec
- Major cities: Saint-Jean-sur-Richelieu, Sorel-Tracy, Mont-Saint-Hilaire

Highway system
- Quebec provincial highways; Autoroutes; List; Former
← R-132	→ R-134

Route 133 is a historic and heritage road of the Estrie and Montérégie regions in the province of Quebec, with north–south orientation and located on the eastern shore of the Richelieu River. Its northern terminus is in Sorel-Tracy, on the south shore of the Saint Lawrence River. The southern terminus is in Saint-Armand at the United States border with Vermont, close to Highgate Springs, where it continues southward past the Highgate Springs–St. Armand/Philipsburg Border Crossing as Interstate 89. Prior to the 1970s, the portion between the international border and Saint-Jean-sur-Richelieu was known as Route 7, which served as a continuation of US 7.

Route 133 is designated as historic and called Chemin des Patriotes in honour of the Patriot Rebellion of 1837–1838.

The stretch between the US border and Saint-Jean-sur-Richelieu is relatively busy, as it provided the main link between Boston and Montreal. Construction to extend Autoroute 35 south of Saint-Jean-sur-Richelieu to the US border by-passing Route 133 started in 2009. Construction was slated to be finished in 2017 but continued until 2025.

Trucks are prohibited on this road between Saint-Jean-sur-Richelieu and Autoroute 10 (section of 10 km) and between the junction of road 116 in Mont-Saint-Hilaire and Autoroute 20 (section of 3.5 km). Controversy persists and has gained momentum in 2005 between the Ministry of Transports of Quebec and nearly 3000 residents along the road at Saint-Denis-sur-Richelieu, Saint-Charles-sur-Richelieu, and Mont Saint-Hilaire, north of Autoroute 20. The controversy follows the ministry's decision in 1995 to transfer north–south truck traffic from the roads parallel to the 133 and force it to converge, without an impact study, on Chemin des Patriotes, a historical and heritage path that is on a fragile and weak soil and is in the most populated area. The resulting intense heavy traffic generates noise, vibrations, and pollution day and night, which cause health, insomnia, and safety problems in the local population.

== Municipalities along Route 133 ==
- Saint-Armand
- Pike River
- Saint-Sébastien
- Henryville
- Sainte-Anne-de-Sabrevois
- Saint-Jean-sur-Richelieu
- Richelieu
- Saint-Mathias-sur-Richelieu
- Otterburn Park
- Mont-Saint-Hilaire
- Saint-Charles-sur-Richelieu
- Saint-Denis-sur-Richelieu
- Saint-Ours
- Sainte-Victoire-de-Sorel
- Sorel-Tracy

== Major intersections ==
RCM	Location	km	mi	Exit	Destinations	Notes
Brome-Missisquoi	Saint-Armand	0.0	0.0		I-89 south to US 7 south – St. Albans, Burlington	Continuation into Vermont; R-133 southern terminus; future A-35 southern terminus
Brome-Missisquoi	Saint-Armand	0.0	0.0	Canada–United States border at Highgate Springs–St. Armand/Philipsburg Border Crossing		
Brome-Missisquoi	Saint-Armand	2.1	1.3	(3)	Chemin de Saint-Armand	Canceled interchange; supposed to be part of A-35 extension
Brome-Missisquoi	Saint-Armand	5.4	3.4	5	A-35 / Chemin Champlain	Interchange; southern end of A-35 and its extension; Route 133 exits here
Brome-Missisquoi	Pike River	12.3	7.6		R-202 east – Bedford, Cowansville	South end of R-202 concurrency
Brome-Missisquoi	Pike River	13.2	8.2		R-202 west – Venise-en-Québec, Lacolle	North end of R-202 concurrency
Le Haut-Richelieu	Saint-Sébastien	17.1	10.6		A-35 – Saint-Jean-sur-Richelieu, Montréal	Interchange; A-35 exit 15
Le Haut-Richelieu	Saint-Sébastien	18.8	11.7		R-227 – Venise-en-Québec, Saint-Alexandre	
Le Haut-Richelieu	Sainte-Anne-de-Sabrevois	31.1	19.3		R-225 south – Noyan	
Le Haut-Richelieu	Saint-Jean-sur-Richelieu	39.6	24.6		To A-35 south / Chemin de la Grande-Ligne Est – Saint-Alexandre, Vermont	Northbound access to A-35 south; A-35 north access to R-133
Le Haut-Richelieu	Saint-Jean-sur-Richelieu	40.5	25.2		Boulevard d'Iberville	Roundabout
Le Haut-Richelieu	Saint-Jean-sur-Richelieu	41.3	25.7	38	A-35 south to I-89 – Vermont	Interchange; southbound exit and northbound entrance; south end of A-35 concurrency; exit numbers follow A-35
Le Haut-Richelieu	Saint-Jean-sur-Richelieu	43.0	26.7	39	R-104 east – Mont-Saint-Grégoire, Farnham	South end of R-104 concurrency
Le Haut-Richelieu	Saint-Jean-sur-Richelieu	46.5	28.9	42	A-35 north / R-104 west to R-223 – Saint-Jean-sur-Richelieu Centre-Ville, Chambly, Montréal	North end of A-35 / R-104 concurrency
Rouville	Richelieu	57.2	35.5		A-10 – Montréal, Sherbrooke	A-10 exit 29
Rouville	Richelieu	60.4	37.5		R-112 – Chambly, Montréal, Granby	
La Vallée-du-Richelieu	Mont-Saint-Hilaire	76.1	47.3		R-116 / R-229 – Belœil, Saint-Hyacinthe	Partially grade separated
La Vallée-du-Richelieu	Mont-Saint-Hilaire	79.7	49.5		A-20 (TCH) – Montréal, Québec	A-20 exit 113
La Vallée-du-Richelieu	Saint-Charles-sur-Richelieu	90.9	56.5		Rue de l'Union	Ferry connection to Saint-Marc-sur-Richelieu
La Vallée-du-Richelieu	Saint-Denis-sur-Richelieu	101.9	63.3		Rue Handfield	Ferry connection to Saint-Antoine-sur-Richelieu
La Vallée-du-Richelieu	Saint-Denis-sur-Richelieu	102.2	63.5		R-137 south – Saint-Hyacinthe	
Pierre-De Saurel	Saint-Ours	114.2	71.0		Avenue de la Traverse	Ferry connection to Saint-Roch-de-Richelieu
Pierre-De Saurel	Sainte-Victoire-de-Sorel	124.2	77.2		R-239 south – Sainte-Victoire-de-Sorel	
Pierre-De Saurel	Sorel-Tracy	130.1	80.8		A-30 – Montréal, Nicolet	Split intersection
Pierre-De Saurel	Sorel-Tracy	132.2	82.1		R-132 (Avenue de l'Hôtel-Dieu) – Boucherville, Nicolet	
Pierre-De Saurel	Sorel-Tracy	132.9	82.6		Sorel-Tracy ferry terminal	R-133 northern terminus
St. Lawrence River		132.9	82.6	Ferry to Saint-Ignace-de-Loyola (to R-158)		
1.000 mi = 1.609 km; 1.000 km = 0.621 mi: Concurrency terminus; Proposed; Incomplete access; Tolled; Route transition; () – Future A-35 exit number

== See also ==
- List of Quebec provincial highways
