= Quebec Autoroute 35 =

Highway in Quebec

Autoroute 35
- Autoroute de la Vallée-des-Forts
- A-35 highlighted in red

Route information
- Maintained by Transports Québec
- Length: 50 km (31 mi)
- Existed: 1966–present

Major junctions
- South end: R-133 in Saint-Armand
- R-104 in Saint-Jean-sur-Richelieu; R-223 in Saint-Jean-sur-Richelieu; R-219 in Saint-Jean-sur-Richelieu
- North end: A-10 in Chambly

Location
- Country: Canada
- Province: Quebec
- Major cities: Saint-Jean-sur-Richelieu, Chambly, Carignan, Saint-Alexandre, Saint-Armand

Highway system
- Quebec provincial highways; Autoroutes; List; Former
← A-31	→ A-40

Autoroute 35 (A-35) is an Autoroute in the region of Montérégie, Quebec, Canada. With the first section constructed in the 1960s, the A-35 links Saint-Jean-sur-Richelieu with Montreal via the A-10. The A-35 is also the primary route for traffic between Montreal, Canada, and Boston, Massachusetts, United States, although it ends 6.4 kilometres (4.0 mi) north of the Canada–United States border. South of its current terminus in Saint-Armand, the A-35 continues as Route 133, which is a four-lane, divided highway for 6.5 kilometres (4.0 mi) to the border. An extension of A-35 to meet Interstate 89 at Saint-Armand would have completed a nearly 500-kilometre (310 mi) limited-access highway link between Montreal and Boston. It had been scheduled to open in 2017, but was delayed until 2023, and then delayed again until 2025, with the final segment from the border to 6.5 kilometres (4.0 mi) north of it cancelled in March 2025. The southernmost section of Route 133 has been a four-lane, divided highway for many years, allowing the transition from the newly constructed autoroute to be smooth, although not converted to autoroute standards.

Like many Quebec Autoroutes, the A-35 also has a name: Autoroute de la Vallée-des-Forts (Forts Valley Highway). The name refers to a chain of forts built by the French in the Richelieu Valley during the 17th and 18th centuries to defend their colonial settlements from the Iroquois. The A-35 used to be known as Autoroute de la Nouvelle-Angleterre (New England Motorway), referring to its role as a link between Quebec and New England.

== History ==
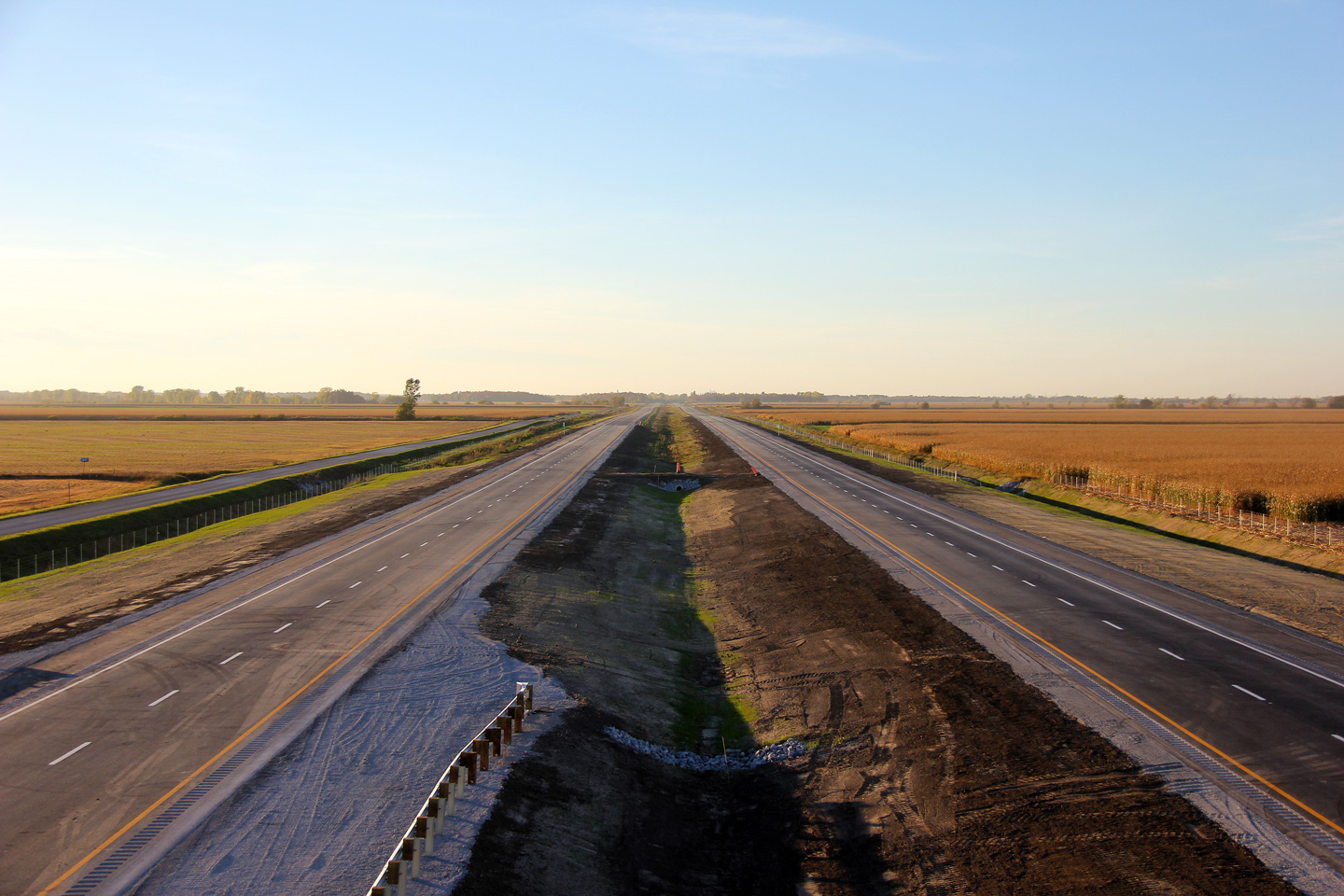
View of then unopened Autoroute 35 looking northerly from the Route 227 overpass

First constructed in the 1960s, Autoroute 35 is currently a 50-kilometre (31 mi) long, 4-lane highway linking Route 133 in Saint-Armand with Autoroute 10 in Chambly, passing through Saint-Jean-sur-Richelieu. The initial sixteen kilometres (9.9 mi) of A-35 were opened in 1966, connecting the A-10 in Chambly with Route 104 in Iberville. Another 3 kilometres (1.9 mi) of A-35 from Route 104 to Route 133 southeast of Iberville were completed in 1967. Completion of the entire length of A-35 had been scheduled for that year in time for Expo 67, but the province instead focused on expediting construction of autoroutes and approach roads to the Expo site.

For many years, the A-35 featured at-grade intersections with St-Raphael Road and St-Andre Road in Saint-Luc. These intersections were closed in 1999; the St-Andre Road intersection was converted into a partial cloverleaf interchange, while St-Raphael Road was dead-ended on either side of the A-35.

A federal-provincial funding agreement provided for the completion of the A-35 to Interstate 89 at the U.S. border. The project's objectives were to improve economic links between Quebec and New England, reduce traffic on Route 133 (which was ill-equipped for the traffic it carried) and improve quality of life in the region.

Construction of the A-35 extension began in 2009 between Saint-Alexandre and Saint-Sébastien. Construction of the 37.9-kilometre (23.5 mi) extension was divided into four phases. The first sections (both Phase I and Phase II) of new highway between Saint-Jean-sur-Richelieu and Highway 133 to Saint-Sébastien were opened to traffic on October 8, 2014.

On June 10, 2019, federal and provincial government officials announced plans to extend Quebec's Highway 35 by nearly 9 kilometres (5.6 mi) in the southbound direction (Phase III), extending Highway 35 from Route 133 in Saint-Sébastien to the junction of Route 133 and chemin Champlain and du Moulin in Saint-Armand. This work began in 2020, and by December 2023, the majority of Phase III had been completed, including an overpass for Route 202 over Highway 35 in Pike River. However, the bridge over Rivière-aux-Brochets was not finished for several months due to a supply chain issue with steel beams. An overpass with Route 133 passing over Highway 35, an interchange at the junction of Highway 35, Champlain Road and Route 133 at Saint-Armand, and a roundabout built just to the northeast of that at the intersection of Route 133 and Champlain and Moulin roads in Saint-Armand, were opened to traffic on October 11, 2023.The opening of the new highway for traffic was on September 3, 2025.

== Future ==
Phase IV would have completed 4.5 kilometres (2.8 mi) of the project between the intersection of Route 133 and Champlain and du Moulin Roads in Saint-Armand to the U.S. border. However, this project was postponed after being removed from the 2025-2035 Quebec Infrastructure Plan by the Quebec Treasury Board due to budget cuts in March 2025.

In addition, the interchange in Saint-Alexandre that was not built as part of Phase II of the extension, which had been planned for the location where Highway 227 crosses Highway 35 on Rang des Dussault, and which was later planned to be moved to the southeast to meet a re-routed Highway 227 that continues southwest from its current intersection at Rang des Soixante and Chemin de la Grande Ligne, was cancelled after being removed from the 2025-2035 Quebec Infrastructure Plan by the Quebec Treasury Board due to budget cuts in March 2025.

If completed, the length of A-35 would increase to 55 kilometres (34 mi).

== Exit list ==
RCM	Location	km	mi	Old exit	New exit	Destinations	Notes
Brome-Missisquoi	Saint-Armand	0.00	0.00		–	I-89 south to US 7 south – St. Albans, Burlington	Continuation into Vermont; current R-133 southern terminus
Brome-Missisquoi	Saint-Armand	0.00	0.00	Canada–United States border at Highgate Springs–St. Armand/Philipsburg Border Crossing			
Brome-Missisquoi	Saint-Armand				3	Chemin de Saint-Armand	Cancelled interchange; currently at-grade intersection
Brome-Missisquoi	Saint-Armand	5.4	3.4		5	R-133 (Chemin Champlain)	Interchange opened on September 3, 2025; A-35 southern terminus
Le Haut-Richelieu	Saint-Sébastien	14.81	9.20		15	R-133 / R-227 / R-202 – Bedford, Henryville, Venise-en-Québec	Former southern terminus of A-35 until September 3, 2025
Le Haut-Richelieu	Saint-Jean-sur-Richelieu	35.50	22.06		36	R-133 south (Chemin de la Grande-Ligne) / Boulevard d'Iberville – Sainte-Anne-de-Sabrevois	Northbound exit and southbound entrance
Le Haut-Richelieu	Saint-Jean-sur-Richelieu	37.61	23.37	1	38	R-133 south (Chemin de la Grande-Ligne) / Boulevard d'Iberville – Sainte-Anne-de-Sabrevois	South end of R-133 concurrency; southbound exit and northbound entrance
Le Haut-Richelieu	Saint-Jean-sur-Richelieu	39.18	24.35	3	39	R-104 east – Mont-Saint-Grégoire, Cowansville	South end of R-104 concurrency
Le Haut-Richelieu	Saint-Jean-sur-Richelieu	42.21	26.23	6	42	R-133 north (Chemin des Patriotes) – Richelieu	North end of R-133 concurrency
Le Haut-Richelieu	Saint-Jean-sur-Richelieu	43.55	27.06	7	43	R-223 (Boulevard du Séminaire) – Centre-Ville	Signed as exits 43N (north) and 43S (south)
Le Haut-Richelieu	Saint-Jean-sur-Richelieu	44.88	27.89	9	45	R-219 (Rue Pierre-Caisse)	
Le Haut-Richelieu	Saint-Jean-sur-Richelieu	46.64	28.98	11	47	R-104 west (Boulevard Saint-Luc) – La Prairie	North end of R-104 concurrency; signed as exits 47E (east) and 47O (west)
Le Haut-Richelieu	Saint-Jean-sur-Richelieu	50.52	31.39	14	50	Chemin St-André	
La Vallée-du-Richelieu	Carignan–Chambly boundary	54.99	34.17	18	55	A-10 (Autoroute des Cantons-de-l'Est) – Montréal, Sherbrooke Boulevard Fréchette – Chambly	Signed as exits 55E (east) and 55O (west); A-10 exit 22; A-35 northern terminus
1.000 mi = 1.609 km; 1.000 km = 0.621 mi: Closed/former; Concurrency terminus; Incomplete access; Route transition; Unopened
