= Quebec Route 104 =

Highway in Quebec, Canada

Route 104

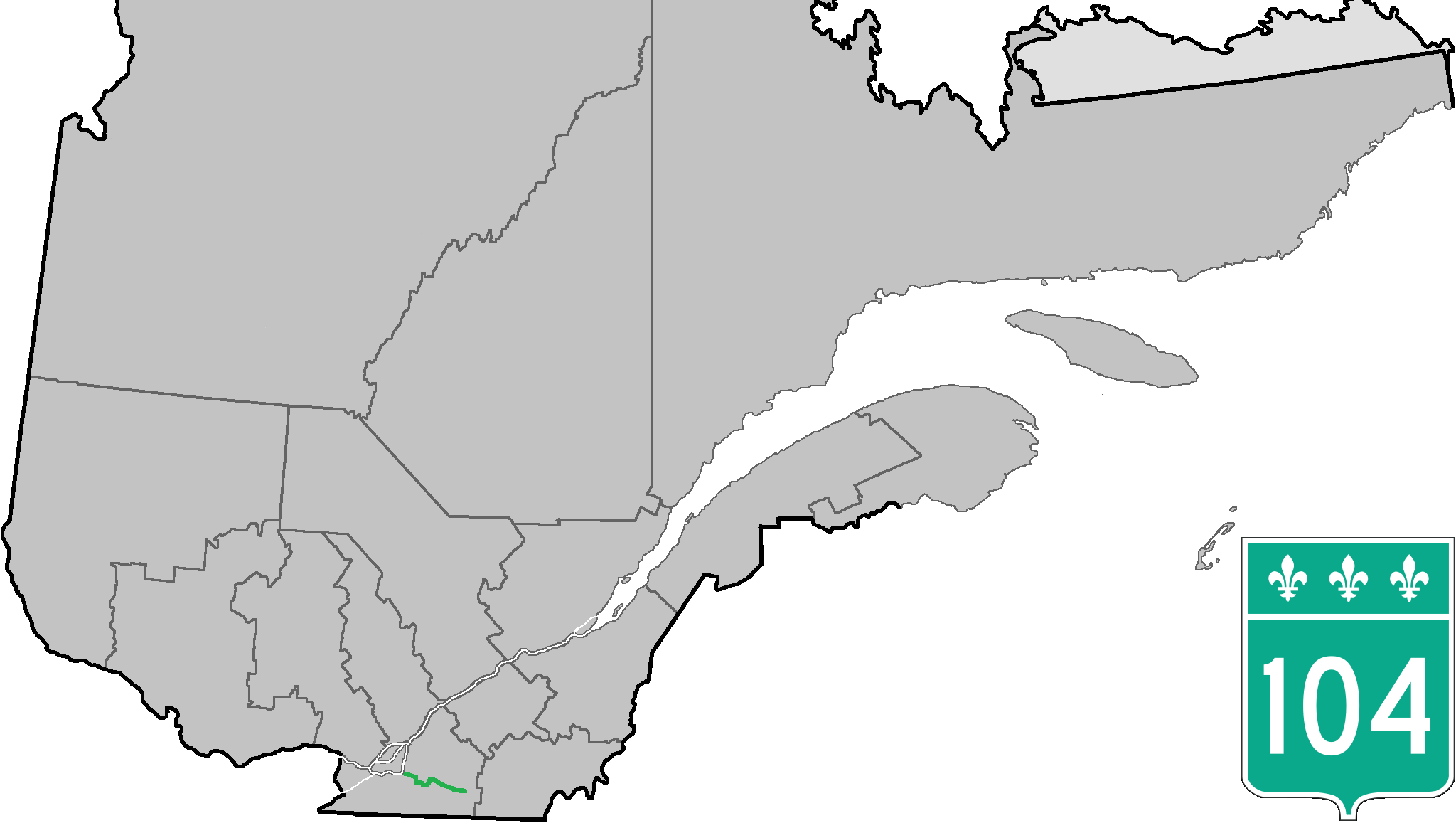

Route information
- Maintained by Transports Québec
- Length: 93.5 km (58.1 mi)
- History: Route 9B (La Prairie–Saint-Jean-sur-Richelieu); Route 40 (Mont-Saint-Grégoire–Brome Lake); Route 40A (Saint-Jean-sur-Richelieu–Mont-Saint-Grégoire)

Major junctions
- West end: R-134 in La Prairie
- A-30 / R-134 in La Prairie; A-35 / R-133 in Saint-Jean-sur-Richelieu; R-139 in Cowansville; R-139 in Lac-Brome
- East end: R-243 in Lac-Brome (Knowlton)

Location
- Country: Canada
- Province: Quebec

Highway system
- Quebec provincial highways; Autoroutes; List; Former
← R-101	→ R-105

Route 104 is an east/west highway on the south shore of the St. Lawrence River. Its eastern terminus is in Knowlton at the junction of Route 243 and its western terminus is in La Prairie at the junction of Route 134.

== Municipalities along Route 104 ==
- La Prairie
- Saint-Jean-sur-Richelieu
- Mont-Saint-Grégoire
- Sainte-Brigide-d'Iberville
- Farnham
- Brigham
- Dunham
- Cowansville
- Brome Lake

== Major intersections ==
RCM	Location	km	mi	Destinations	Notes
Roussillon	La Prairie	0.0	0.0	R-134 – Candiac, Brossard, Montréal	
Roussillon	La Prairie	2.7	1.7	A-30 / R-217 south – Vaudreuil-Dorion, Sorel-Tracy, Saint-Philippe	Exit 62 on A-30; northern terminus of R-217
Le Haut-Richelieu	Saint-Jean-sur-Richelieu	18.8	11.7	A-35 north / Boulevard Saint-Luc east – Carignan, Montréal	Exit 47 on A-35; western terminus of concurrency with A-35
Le Haut-Richelieu	Saint-Jean-sur-Richelieu	19.9	12.4	R-219 south (Rue Pierre-Caisse)	Exit 45 on A-35; northern terminus of R-219
Le Haut-Richelieu	Saint-Jean-sur-Richelieu	21.9	13.6	R-223 (Boulevard du Séminaire) – Centre-Ville	Exit 43 on A-35
Le Haut-Richelieu	Saint-Jean-sur-Richelieu			Félix-Gabriel-Marchand Bridge over Richelieu River	
Le Haut-Richelieu	Saint-Jean-sur-Richelieu	23.5	14.6	R-133 north (Chemin des Patriotes East) – Richelieu	Exit 42 on A-35; western terminus of concurrency with R-133
Le Haut-Richelieu	Saint-Jean-sur-Richelieu	25.9	16.1	A-35 south / R-133 south to I-89 – Vermont	Exit 39 on A-35; eastern terminus of concurrency with A-35 and R-133
Le Haut-Richelieu	Mont-Saint-Grégoire–Sainte-Brigide-d'Iberville line	38.3	23.8	R-227 – Marieville, Saint-Alexandre	
Brome-Missisquoi	Farnham	28.2	17.5	R-233 north – Saint-Cesaire	Southern terminus of R-233
Brome-Missisquoi	Farnham	49.9	31.0	R-235 north – Ange-Gardien	Western terminus of concurrency with R-235
Brome-Missisquoi	Farnham	51.9	32.2	R-235 south – Bedford	Eastern terminus of concurrency with R-235
Brome-Missisquoi	Cowansville	70.6	43.9	R-139 north to A-10 – Granby	Western terminus of concurrency with R-139
Brome-Missisquoi	Cowansville	73.3	45.5	R-202 west – Dunham	Eastern terminus of R-202
Brome-Missisquoi	Cowansville	78.6	48.8	R-241 north – Bromont	Southern terminus of R-241
Brome-Missisquoi	Lac-Brome	81.3	50.5	R-139 south – West-Brome, Sutton	Eastern terminus of concurrency with R-139
Brome-Missisquoi	Lac-Brome	87.4	54.3	R-215 – Waterloo, Brome	
Brome-Missisquoi	Lac-Brome	93.6	58.2	R-243 to A-10 – Waterloo, Mansonville	
1.000 mi = 1.609 km; 1.000 km = 0.621 mi: Concurrency terminus

== See also ==
- List of Quebec provincial highways
