= Saint-Charles-sur-Richelieu =

- Municipality
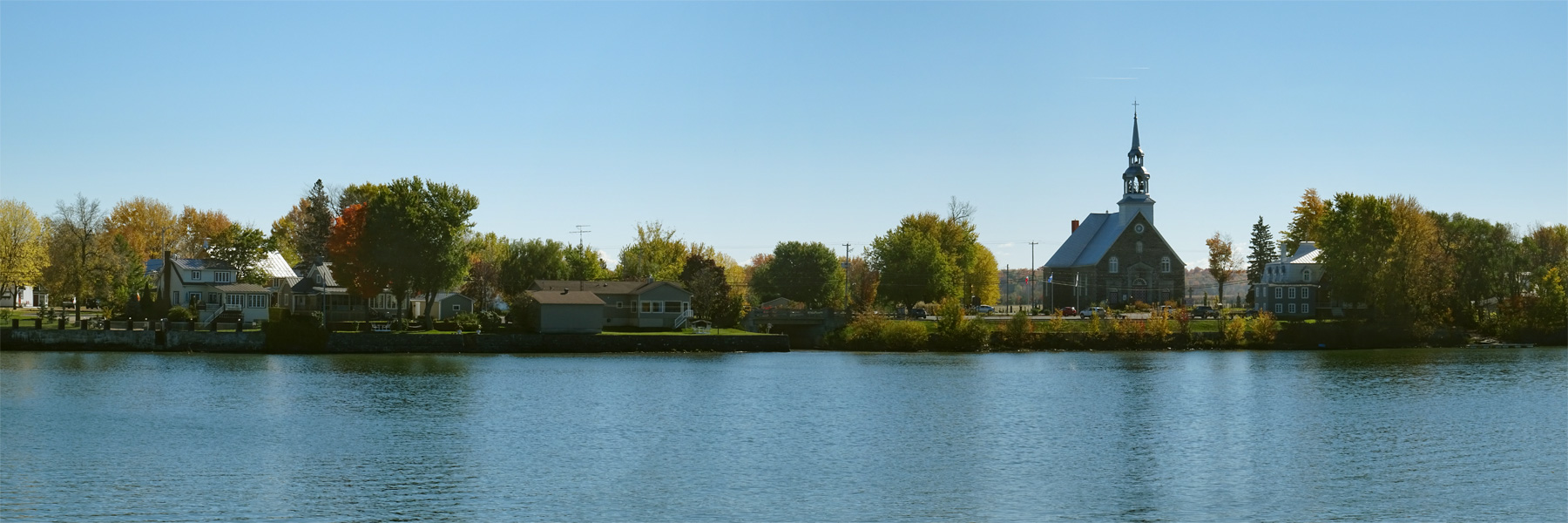

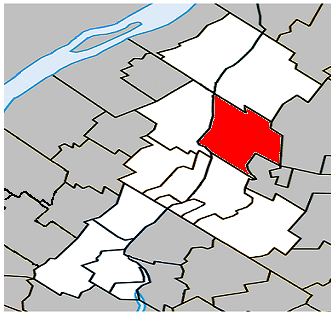
- Location within La Vallée-du-Richelieu RCM.

- Location in southern Quebec.
- Coordinates: 45°41′N 73°11′W
- Country: Canada
- Province: Quebec
- Region: Montérégie
- RCM: La Vallée-du-Richelieu
- Settled: 1698
- Constituted: March 22, 1995

Government
  - Mayor: Julie Lussier
  - Federal riding: Pierre-Boucher—Les Patriotes—Verchères
  - Prov. riding: Borduas

Area
  - Total: 66.60 km^{2} (25.71 sq mi)
  - Land: 64.91 km^{2} (25.06 sq mi)

Population (2021)
  - Total: 1,735
  - Density: 26.7/km^{2} (69/sq mi)
  - Pop 2016-2021: ▲1.0%
  - Dwellings: 794
- Time zone: UTC−5 (EST)
  - Summer (DST): UTC−4 (EDT)
- Postal code(s): J0H 2G0
- Area codes: 450 and 579
- Highways: R-133
- Website: www.saint-charles -sur-richelieu.ca

Saint-Charles-sur-Richelieu (French pronunciation: [sɛ̃ ʃaʁl syʁ ʁiʃ(ə)ljø], lit. 'Saint-Charles on Richelieu') is a municipality in southwestern Quebec, Canada, on the Richelieu River in the Regional County Municipality of La Vallée-du-Richelieu. The population as of the Canada 2021 Census was 1,735.

== Geography ==
=== Communities ===
- Kierkoski
- Saint-Charles-sur-Richelieu

== Demographics ==
=== Population ===
Canada census – Saint-Charles-sur-Richelieu community profile

	2021	2016
Population	1,735 (+1.0% from 2016)	1,717 (+4.5% from 2011)
Land area	64.91 km^{2} (25.06 sq mi)	65.00 km^{2} (25.10 sq mi)
Population density	26.7/km^{2} (69/sq mi)	26.4/km^{2} (68/sq mi)
Median age	50.0 (M: 50.0, F: 50.0)	48.8 (M: 48.4, F: 49.5)
Private dwellings	794 (total) 761 (occupied)	759 (total)
Median household income	$90,000	$78,592

References: 2021 2016

Population Population trend:

Census	Population	Change (%)
1996	1,710	N/A
2001	1,736	▲1.5%
2006	1,742	▲0.3%
2011	1,643	▼5.7%
2016	1,717	▲4.5%
2021	1,735	▲1.0%

Language Mother tongue language (2021)

Language	Population	Pct (%)
French only	1,645	94.8%
English only	40	2.3%
Both English and French	30	1.7%
Other languages	20	1.2%

== See also ==
- List of municipalities in Quebec
