= Highgate Springs–St. Armand/Philipsburg Border Crossing =

Canada–United States border crossing

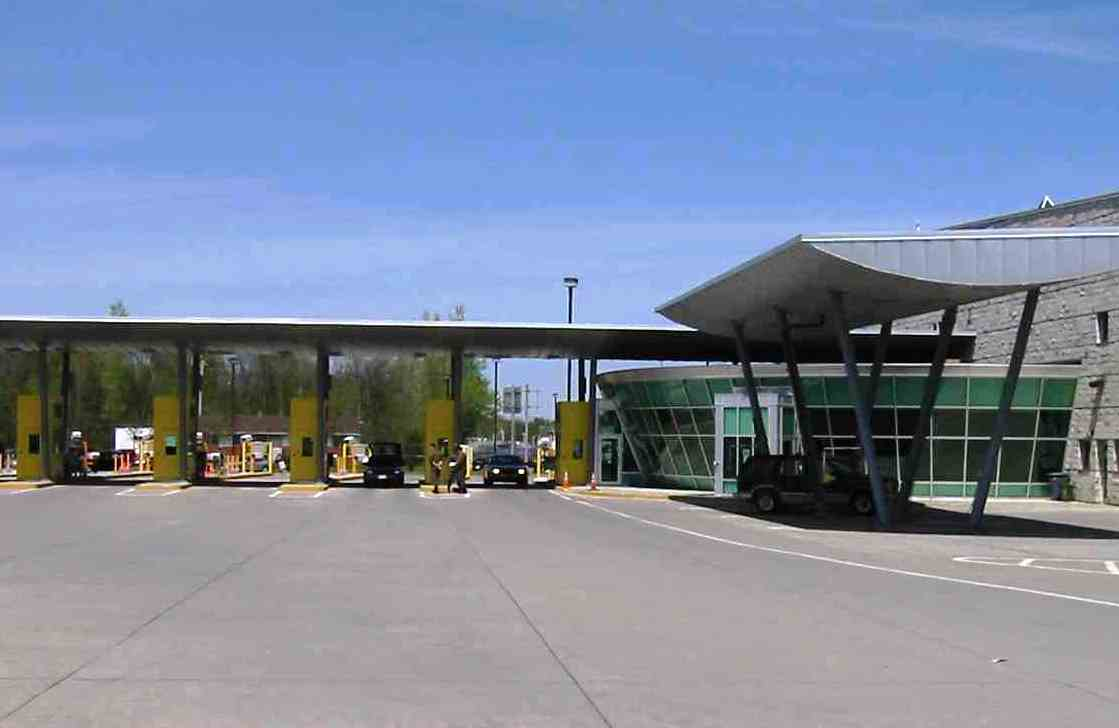
- The U.S. Border Inspection Station at Highgate Springs in 2002

Locaiton
- Country: United States and Canada
- Location: I-89 / R-133; US Port: Interstate 89, Highgate Springs, Vermont 05460; Canadian Port: 10 Route 133, Saint-Armand, Quebec J0J 1T0
- Coordinates: 45.015484°N 73.084606°W

Details
- Opened: 1842

Website
- https://www.cbp.gov/contact/ports/highgate-springs-vermont-0212

The Highgate Springs–St. Armand/Philipsburg Border Crossing connects the towns of Philipsburg, Quebec with Highgate Springs, Vermont on the Canada–US border. It is also the terminus of Interstate 89 and Quebec Route 133. The crossing is the busiest of the fifteen in Vermont.

== History ==
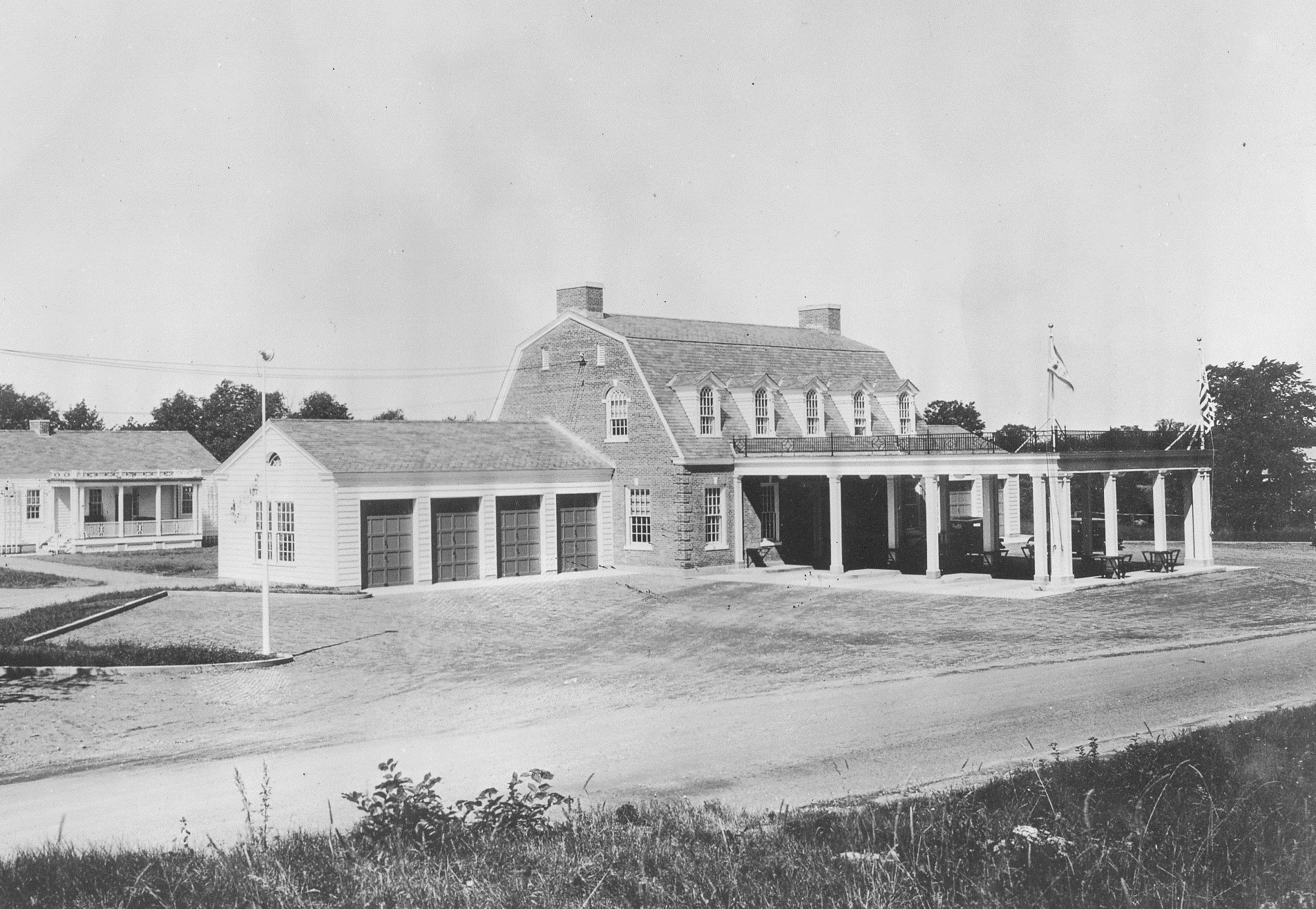
US Border Inspection Station at Highgate Springs VT, as seen in 1935. This building was demolished in 2005

Even before construction of the 4-lane highway, this crossing was the primary route between Montreal and Boston, because it was where US Route 7 crossed into Canada. Route 7 now merges with I-89 prior to crossing the border. When Autoroute 35 is extended to the Canadian side of the border in 2023, there will be a nonstop limited access highway from the second largest city in Canada to Greater Boston.

Through the Infrastructure Investment and Jobs Act of 2021, the United States designated $170 million to modernize the border crossing facilities, with $85 million in federal funds coming from the 2022 Consolidated Appropriations Act. Improvements on the facilities are intended to support the expected increase in traffic from the completion of Autoroute 35, with additional lanes for passenger vehicles, as well as for trucks and commercial traffic. Robin Carnahan, the Administrator of General Services, stated that the projects "will be completed sustainably, using low carbon concrete standards and materials."

The US port of entry has a cattle inspection facility. There is a duty-free shop on the Canadian side at 3 Route 133 in Philipsburg, which services travelers leaving and entering both countries.

== See also ==
- List of Canada–United States border crossings
