= Quebec Route 223 =

Provincial highway in Quebec

Route 223

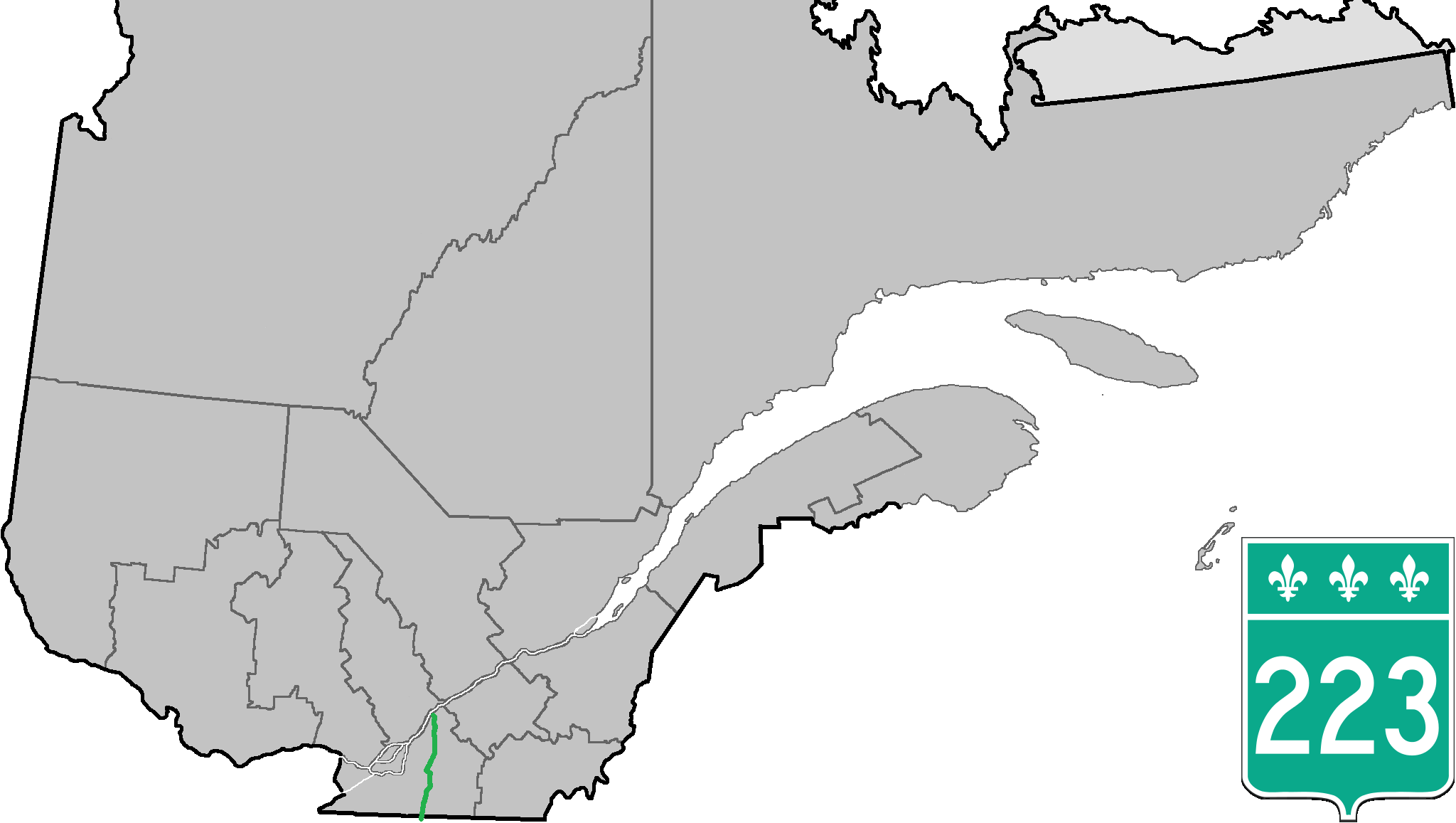

Route information
- Maintained by Transports Québec
- Length: 128.6 km (79.9 mi)

Major junctions
- South end: US 11 at the U.S. border in Rouses Point, NY
- R-202 in Notre-Dame-du-Mont-Carmel; A-35 / R-104 in Saint-Jean-sur-Richelieu; A-10 near Chambly; R-112 in Carignan; A-20 (TCH) / R-116 / R-229 in Beloeil; A-30 in Sorel-Tracy
- North end: R-132 in Sorel-Tracy

Location
- Country: Canada
- Province: Quebec

Highway system
- Quebec provincial highways; Autoroutes; List; Former
← R-222	→ R-224

Route 223 is a 128.6 km north/south highway on the south shore of the Richelieu River in Quebec. Its northern terminus is in Sorel-Tracy at the junction of Route 132 and its southern terminus is close to Lacolle, where it crosses the U.S. border at the Rouses Point–Lacolle 223 Border Crossing and continues into New York state as U.S. Route 11.

In Saint-Jean-sur-Richelieu, Route 223 runs along Boulevard du Séminaire, one of the most important streets of the city and home to the main campus of Cégep de Saint-Jean-sur-Richelieu.

== Municipalities along Route 223 ==
- Notre-Dame-du-Mont-Carmel
- Saint-Paul-de-l'Île-aux-Noix
- Saint-Jean-sur-Richelieu
- Chambly
- Carignan
- McMasterville
- Beloeil
- Saint-Marc-sur-Richelieu
- Saint-Antoine-sur-Richelieu
- Saint-Roch-de-Richelieu
- Sorel-Tracy
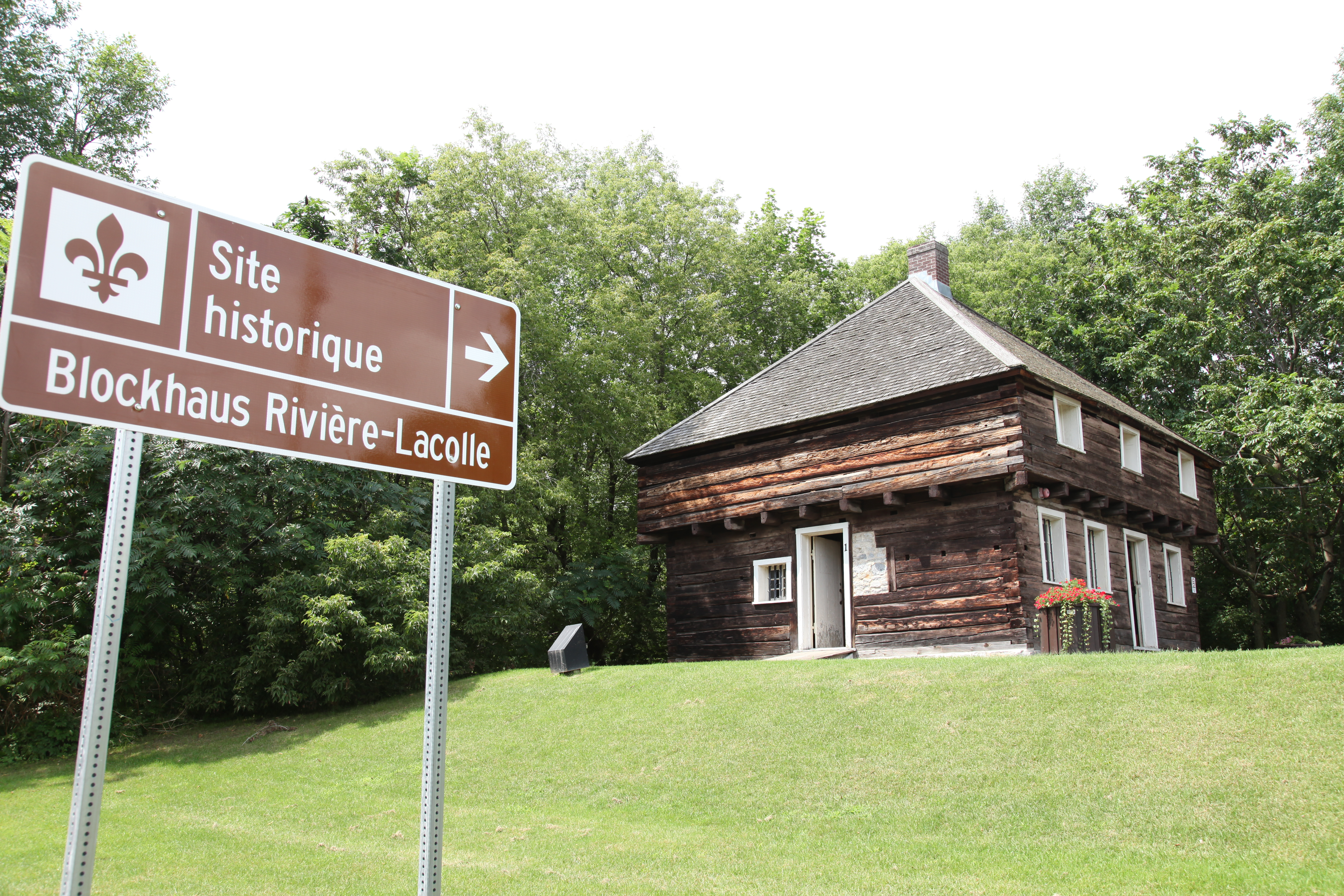
Blockhaus Rivière-Lacolle historic site sign on route 223.

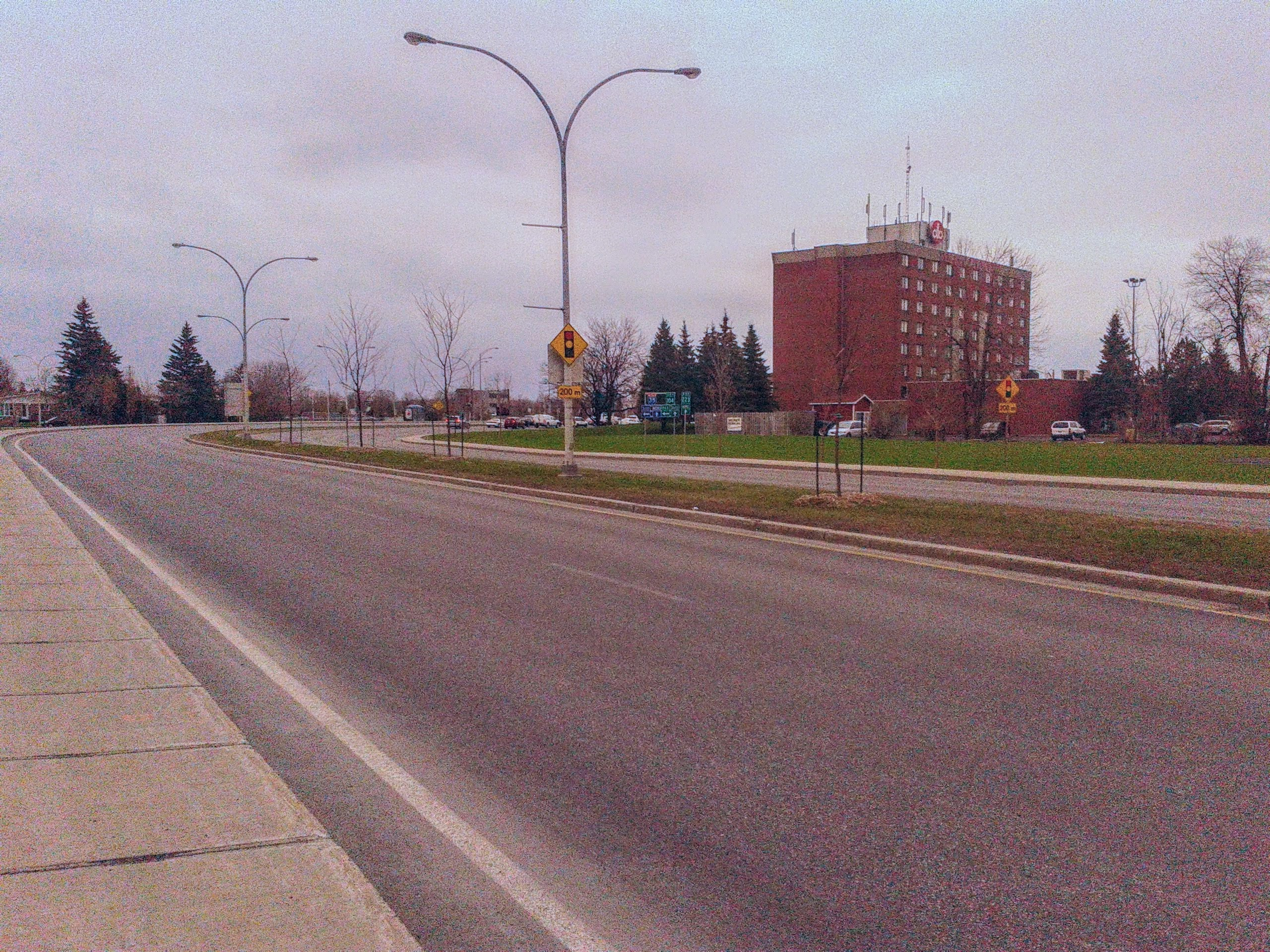
Route 223 through Saint-Jean-sur-Richelieu is made of 4 lanes, divided by a median.

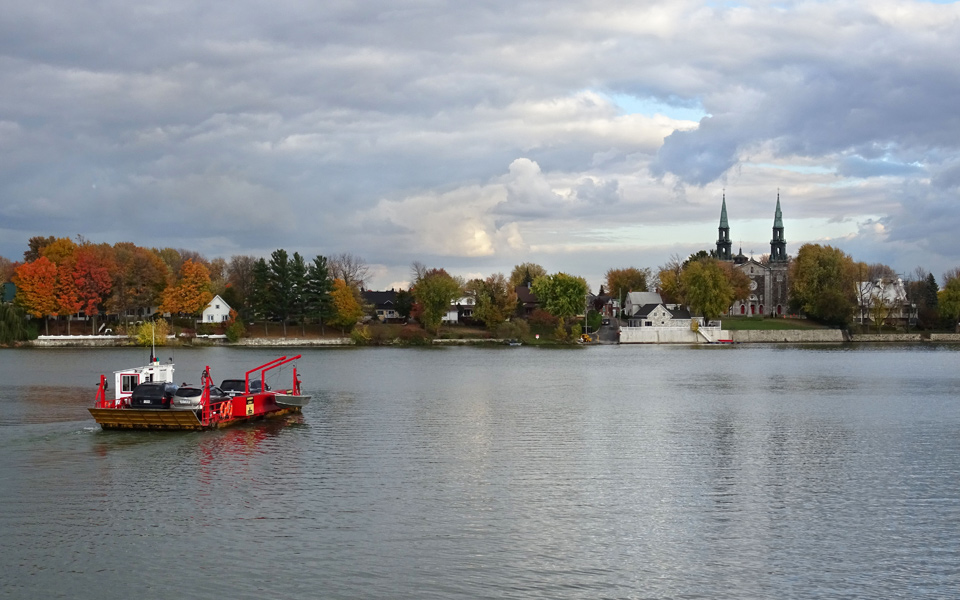
A ferry links Routes 223 and 133 across the Richelieu in Saint-Antoine.

== See also ==
- List of Quebec provincial highways
