= Saint-Sébastien, Montérégie =

Saint-Sébastien
- Municipality
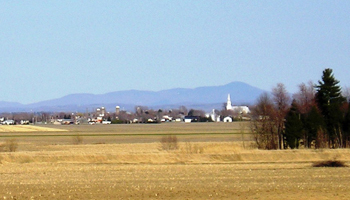

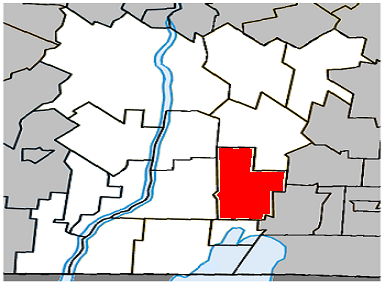
- Location within Le Haut-Richelieu RCM

- Location in southern Quebec
- Coordinates: 45°07′N 73°09′W
- Country: Canada
- Province: Quebec
- Region: Montérégie
- RCM: Le Haut-Richelieu
- Constituted: February 17, 1865

Government
  - Mayor: Martin Thibert
  - Federal riding: Brome—Missisquoi
  - Prov. riding: Iberville

Area
  - Total: 64.00 km^{2} (24.71 sq mi)
  - Land: 63.29 km^{2} (24.44 sq mi)

Population (2021)
  - Total: 692
  - Density: 10.9/km^{2} (28/sq mi)
  - Pop 2016-2021: ▼3.6%
  - Dwellings: 284
- Time zone: UTC−5 (EST)
  - Summer (DST): UTC−4 (EDT)
- Postal code(s): J0J 2C0
- Area codes: 450 and 579
- Highways A-35: R-133; R-202; R-227
- Website: www.paroisse-saint-sebastien.ca

Saint-Sébastien (French pronunciation: [sɛ̃ sebastjɛ̃]) is a municipality in Le Haut-Richelieu Regional County Municipality in the Montérégie region of Quebec, Canada. The population as of the Canada 2021 Census was 692.

== Demographics ==
=== Population ===
Canada census – Saint-Sébastien community profile

	2021	2011
Population	692 (-3.6% from 2016)	736 (+7.9% from 2006)
Land area	63.29 km^{2} (24.44 sq mi)	63.67 km^{2} (24.58 sq mi)
Population density	10.9/km^{2} (28/sq mi)	11.6/km^{2} (30/sq mi)
Median age	39.6 (M: 38.8, F: 40.4)	40.6 (M: 41.5, F: 38.9)
Private dwellings	270 (total)	282 (total)
Median household income		$52,584

References: 2021 2011

Historical Census Data - Saint-Sébastien, Montérégie, Quebec
Year	Pop.	±%
1991	800	—
1996	749	−6.4%
2001	766	+2.3%
2006	682	−11.0%
2011	736	+7.9%
2016	718	−2.4%
2021	692	−3.6%

=== Language ===
Canada Census Mother Tongue - Saint-Sébastien, Montérégie, Quebec
Census	Total	French			English			French & English			Other		
Year	Responses	Count	Trend	Pop %	Count	Trend	Pop %	Count	Trend	Pop %	Count	Trend	Pop %
2011	720	655	▲22.43%	90.97%	20	▲33.3%	2.78%	5	▼66.7%	0.69%	40	▼57.9%	5.56%
2006	660	535	▼10.8%	81.06%	15	▼72.7%	2.27%	15	▼ n/a%	2.27%	95	▲35.7%	14.39%
2001	725	600	▼16.1%	82.76%	55	▲ n/a%	7.59%	0	0.0%	0.00%	70	▲133.3%	9.65%
1996	745	715	n/a	95.97%	0	n/a	0.00%	0	n/a	0.00%	30	n/a	4.03%

== See also ==
- List of municipalities in Quebec
