= De Lorimier Avenue =

Thoroughfare in Montreal, Canada

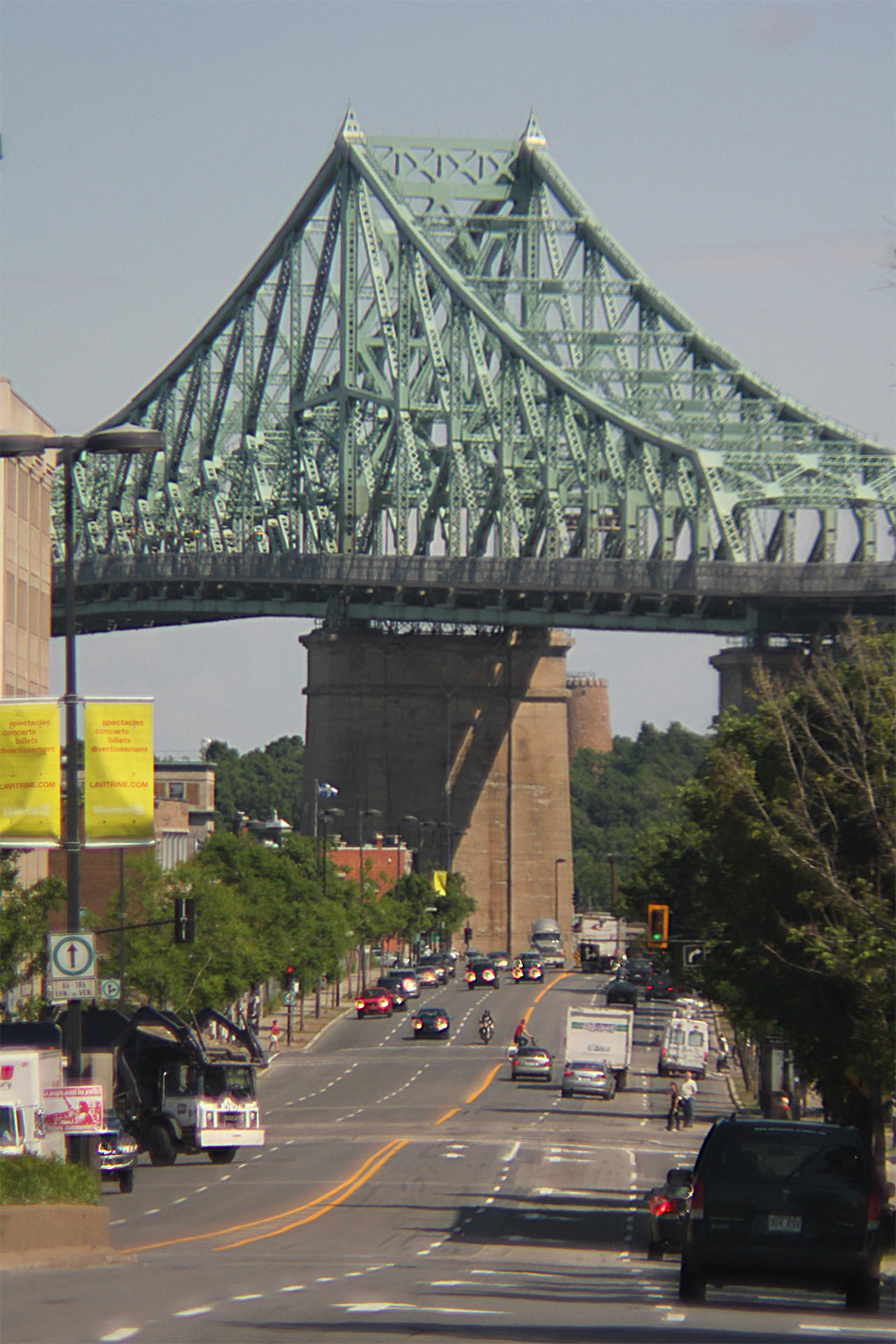
- De Lorimier Avenue
- Native name: Avenue De Lorimier (French)
- Former name(s): Colborne Avenue
- Part of: R-134 northbound between Logan Avenue and Sherbrooke Street
- Length: 6.7 km (4.2 mi)
- From: Rue Notre-Dame
- Major junctions: A-40 (TCH); R-138
- To: Avenue Étienne-Brûlé

Construction
- Inauguration: 27 June 1883

De Lorimier Avenue (officially in French: Avenue De Lorimier) is a major north–south avenue located in Montreal, Quebec, Canada.

It's named after François-Marie-Thomas Chevalier de Lorimier, a leader in the Lower Canada Rebellion, who was executed in the nearby prison.

== History ==
De Lorimier Avenue was originally named Colborne Avenue, after general John Colborne, who fought against the patriots in the Lower Canada Rebellion. It was renamed to De Lorimier on 27 June 1883.

== Geography ==
De Lorimier runs from Rue Notre-Dame, near the base of the Jacques Cartier Bridge, to slightly past Crémazie Boulevard in the north of the island.

It traverses the boroughs of Ville-Marie, Le Plateau-Mont-Royal, Rosemont–La Petite-Patrie and Villeray–Saint-Michel–Parc-Extension.

The historic Prison du Pied-du-Courant is located on De Lorimier, by the St. Lawrence River.
