= Saint-Roch-de-Richelieu =

- Municipality
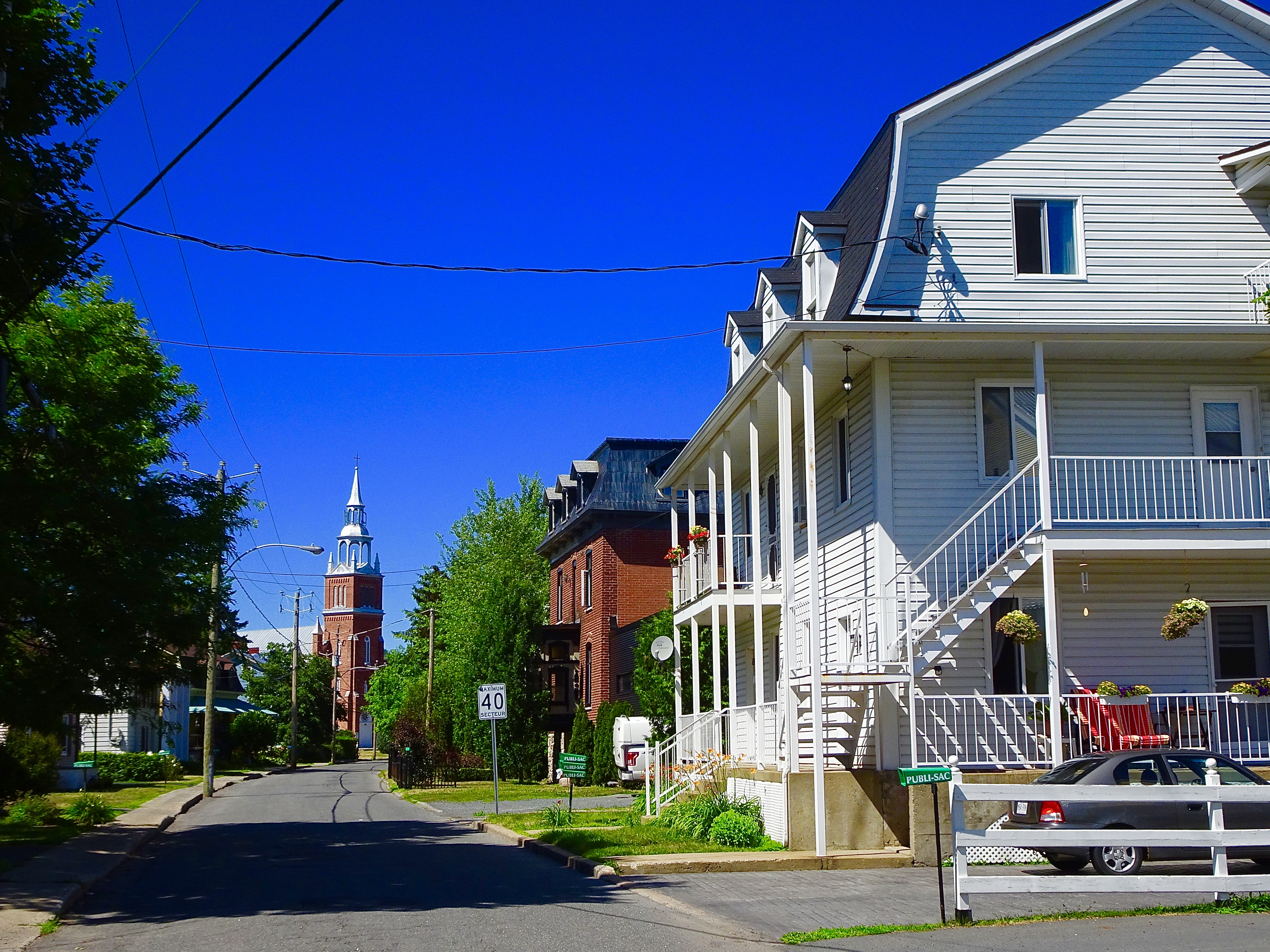
- Saint-Jean-Baptiste street

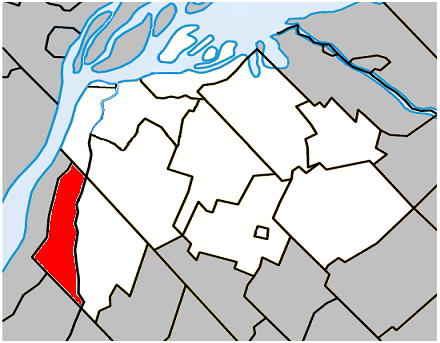
- Location within Pierre-De Saurel RCM.

- Location in southern Quebec.
- Coordinates: 45°53′N 73°10′W
- Country: Canada
- Province: Quebec
- Region: Montérégie
- RCM: Pierre-De Saurel
- Constituted: June 4, 1859

Government
  - Mayor: Alain Chapdelaine
  - Federal riding: Bécancour—Nicolet—Saurel—Alnôbak
  - Prov. riding: Richelieu

Area
  - Total: 36.70 km^{2} (14.17 sq mi)
  - Land: 34.44 km^{2} (13.30 sq mi)

Population (2021)
  - Total: 2,573
  - Density: 74.7/km^{2} (193/sq mi)
  - Pop 2016-2021: ▲17.6%
  - Dwellings: 1,172
- Time zone: UTC−5 (EST)
  - Summer (DST): UTC−4 (EDT)
- Postal code(s): J0L 2M0
- Area codes: 450 and 579
- Highways: R-223
- Website: www.saintroch derichelieu.qc.ca

Saint-Roch-de-Richelieu (French pronunciation: [sɛ̃ ʁɔk də ʁiʃ(ə)ljø], lit. 'Saint-Roch of Richelieu') is a municipality located in the Pierre-De Saurel Regional County Municipality of Quebec (Canada), in the administrative region of Montérégie. The population as of the Canada 2021 Census was 2,573.

== Demographics ==
=== Population ===
Population trend:

Census	Population	Change (%)
2021	2,573	▲17.6%
2016	2,188	▲3.1%
2011	2,122	▲13.5%
2006	1,870	▲6.3%
2001	1,760	▲1.2%
1996	1,739	▲3.0%
1991	1,689	▲5.7%
1986	1,598	▼3.2%
1981	1,650	▲15.4%
1976	1,430	▲17.3%
1971	1,219	▲34.0%
1966	910	▲22.6%
1961	742	▼6.7%
1956	795	▲5.7%
1951	752	▲3.9%
1941	724	▼4.1%
1931	755	▼2.3%
1921	773	▼5.8%
1911	821	▼8.8%
1901	900	▼13.9%
1891	1,045	▲2.5%
1881	1,020	▲4.9%
1871	972	▼3.3%
1861	1,005	N/A

=== Language ===
Mother tongue language (2021)

Language	Population	Pct (%)
French only	2,470	96.1%
English only	40	1.6%
Both English & French	25	1.0%
Other languages	35	1.4%

== See also ==
- List of municipalities in Quebec
