= Highgate Springs, Vermont =

Census-designated place in Vermont, United States

- Census-designated place
- Location within Vermont Location within the United States
- Coordinates: 44°58′42″N 73°06′20″W
- Country: United States
- State: Vermont
- County: Franklin
- Town: Highgate

Area
  - Total: 0.36 sq mi (0.94 km^{2})
  - Land: 0.29 sq mi (0.75 km^{2})
  - Water: 0.073 sq mi (0.19 km^{2})
- Elevation: 131 ft (40 m)

Population (2020)
  - Total: 77
- Time zone: UTC-5 (Eastern (EST))
  - Summer (DST): UTC-4 (EDT)
- ZIP Code: 05460
- Area code: 802
- FIPS code: 50-33325
- GNIS feature ID: 2586639

Highgate Springs is an unincorporated community and census-designated place (CDP) in the town of Highgate, Franklin County, Vermont, United States. As of the 2020 census it had a population of 77.

== Geography ==
The CDP is in northwestern Franklin County, in the western part of the town of Highgate. It sits on the southeast shore of Missisquoi Bay, an arm of Lake Champlain. U.S. Route 7 passes through the southeast side of the community, and Interstate 89 forms the southeast border. Both highways lead south 4 miles (6 km) to Swanton and north 3 miles (5 km) to the U.S.–Canada border at the Highgate Springs–St. Armand/Philipsburg Border Crossing.

== Education ==
The community is in the Franklin Northwest Supervisory Union school district.
