= Quebec Route 202 =

Highway in Quebec, Canada

Route 202

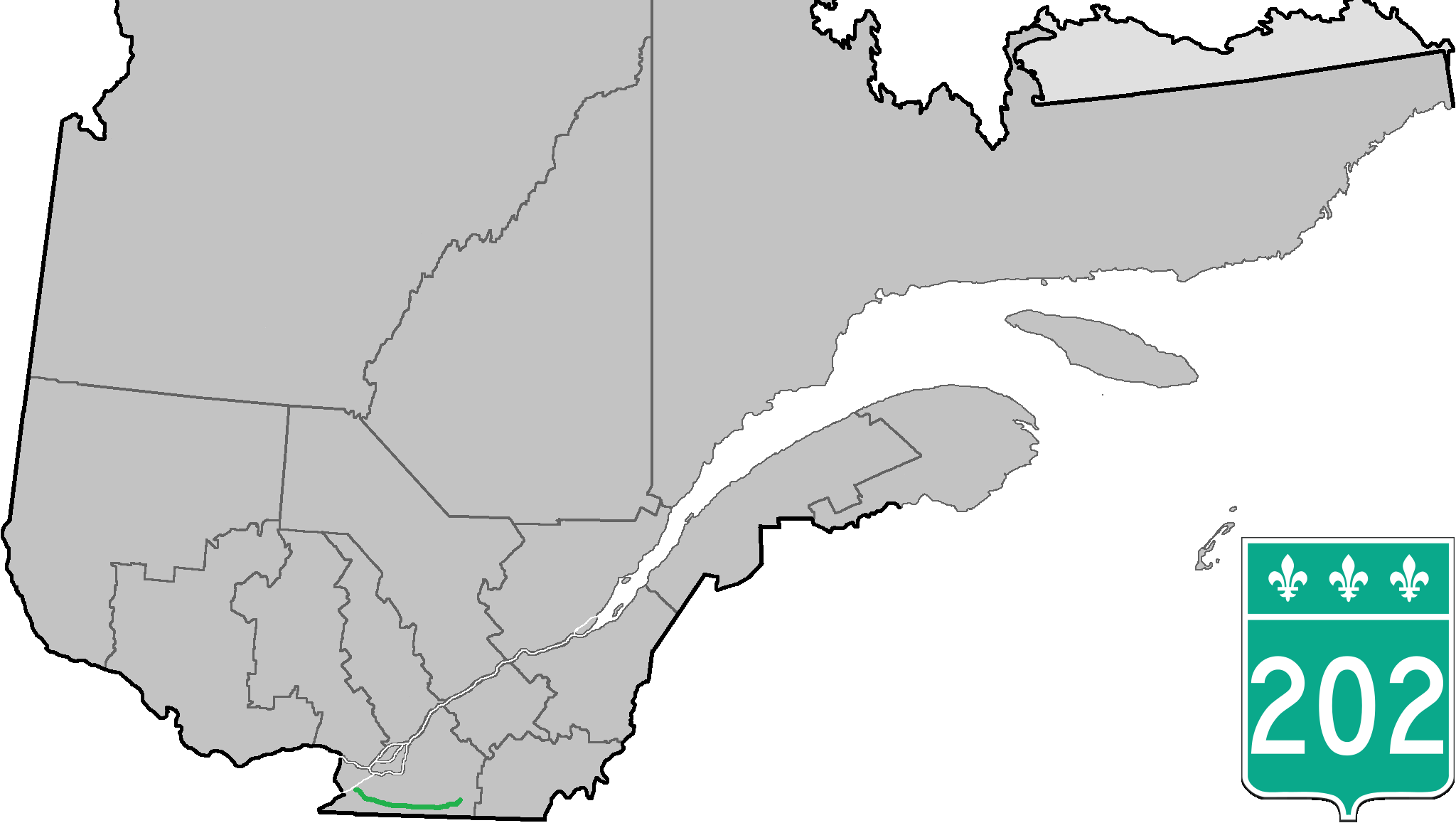

Route information
- Maintained by Transports Québec
- Length: 140.5 km (87.3 mi)

Major junctions
- West end: R-132 in Sainte-Barbe
- R-138 in Huntingdon; A-15 / R-217 in Saint-Bernard-de-Lacolle
- East end: R-104 / R-139 in Cowansville

Location
- Country: Canada
- Province: Quebec

Highway system
- Quebec provincial highways; Autoroutes; List; Former
← R-201	→ R-203

Route 202 is an east/west 140-kilometre highway in the Monteregie and Estrie regions of the province of Quebec, Canada. Its western terminus is at the junction of Route 132 in Sainte-Barbe and its eastern terminus is in southern Cowansville at the junctions of Route 104 and Route 139. The highway runs a few kilometres north of the Canada–United States border for most of its length.

== Municipalities along Route 202 ==
- Sainte-Barbe
- Huntingdon
- Hinchinbrooke
- Franklin
- Havelock
- Hemmingford (township)
- Hemmingford (village)
- Saint-Bernard-de-Lacolle
- Lacolle
- Noyan
- Clarenceville
- Venise-en-Québec
- Pike River
- Stanbridge Station
- Bedford (township)
- Bedford (city)
- Stanbridge East
- Dunham
- Cowansville
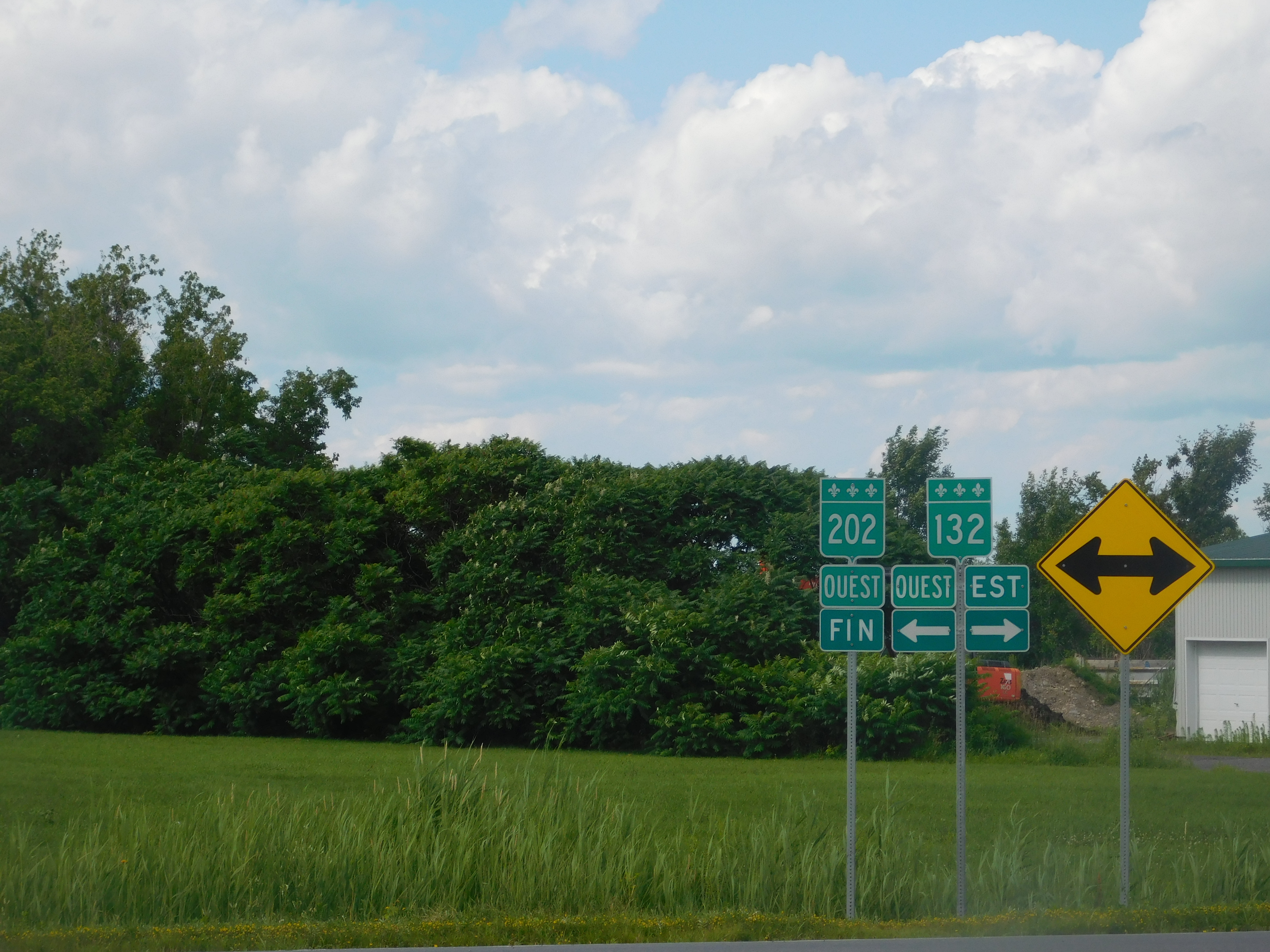
West end, at route 132.

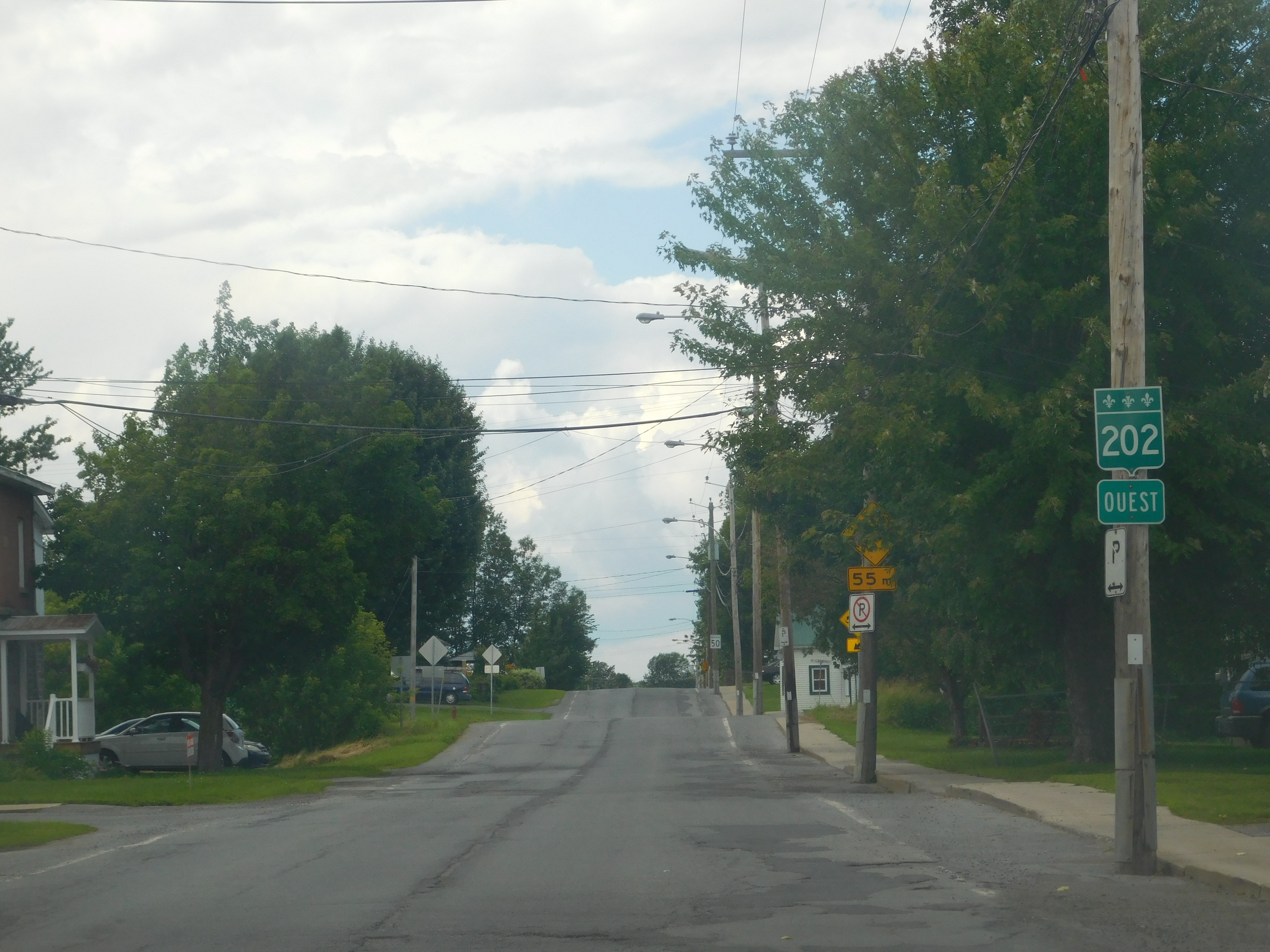
Route 202 in Huntingdon.

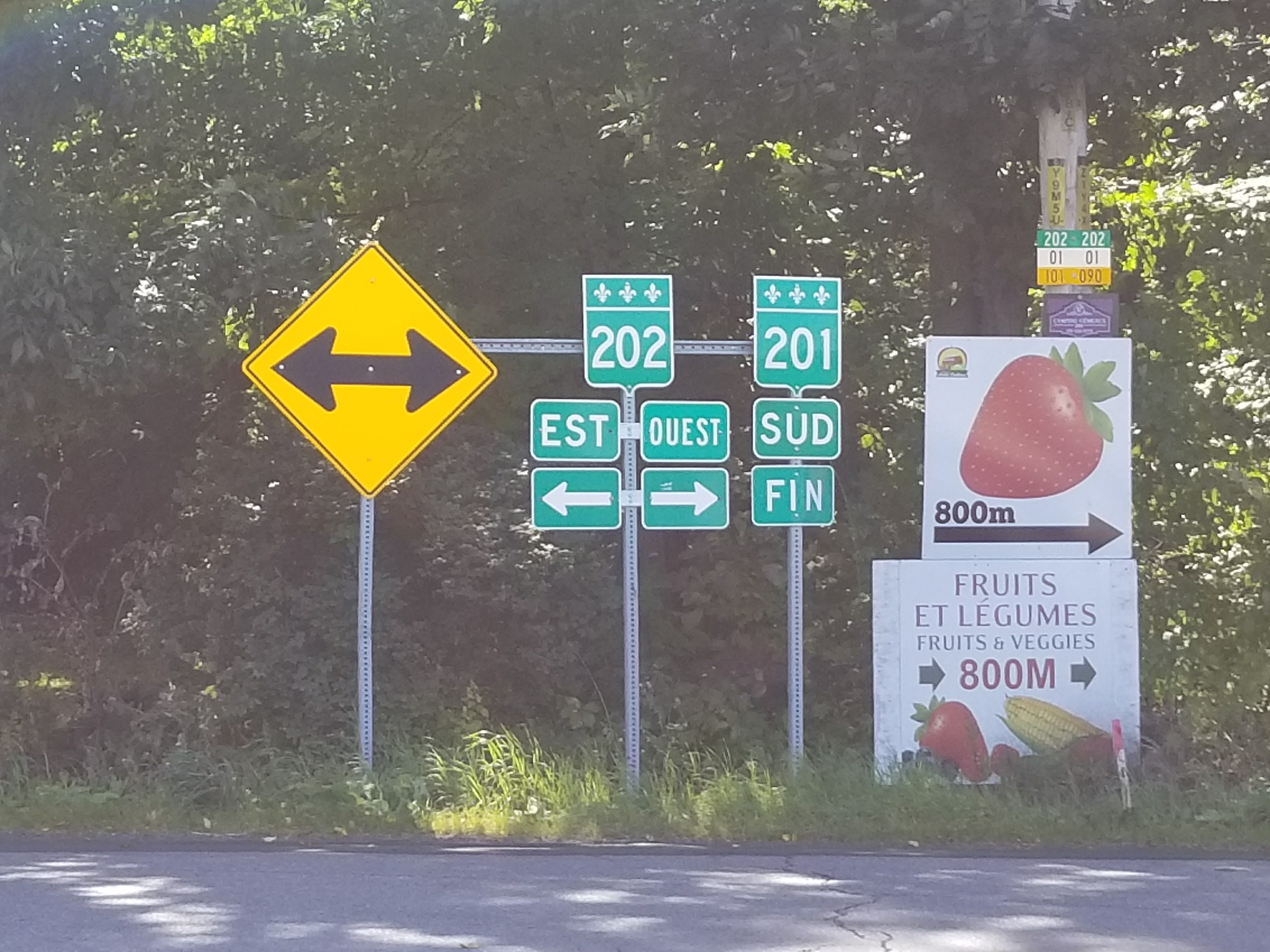
Intersection with 201 in Maritana hamlet near Franklin.

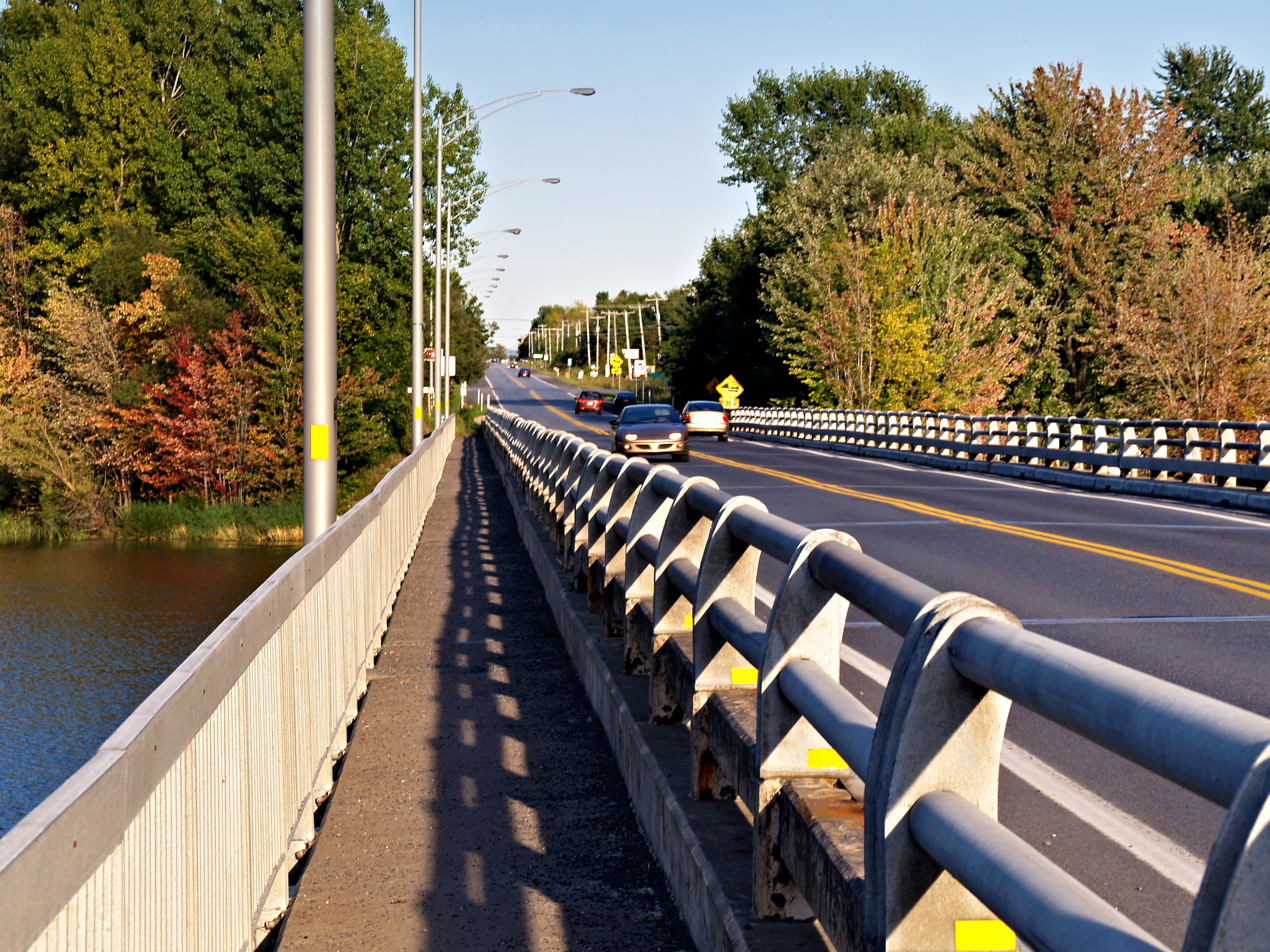
Jean-Jacques-Bertrand Bridge in Noyan, over Richelieu River.

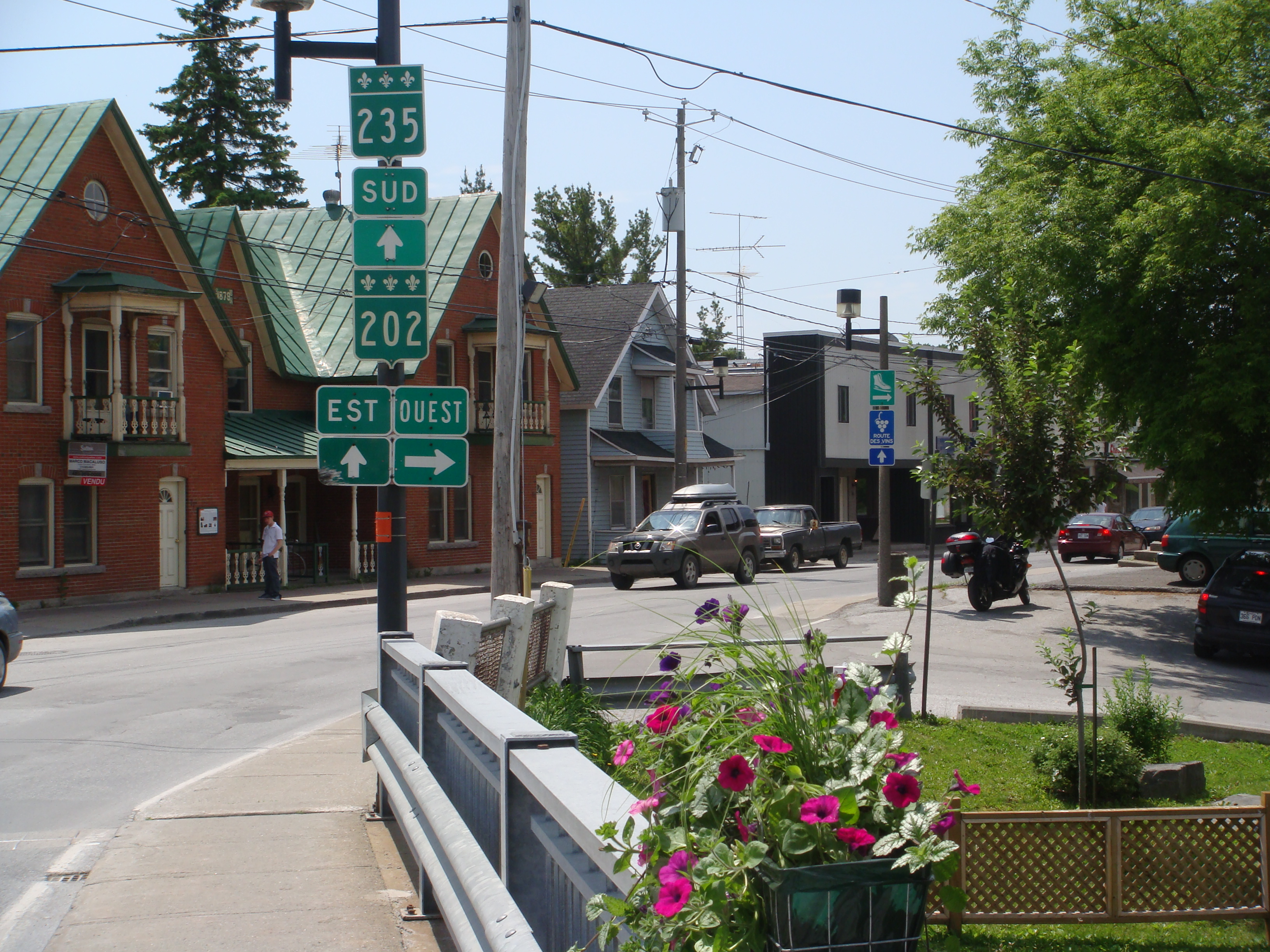
Route 202 is concurrent with Route des Vins in Bedford.

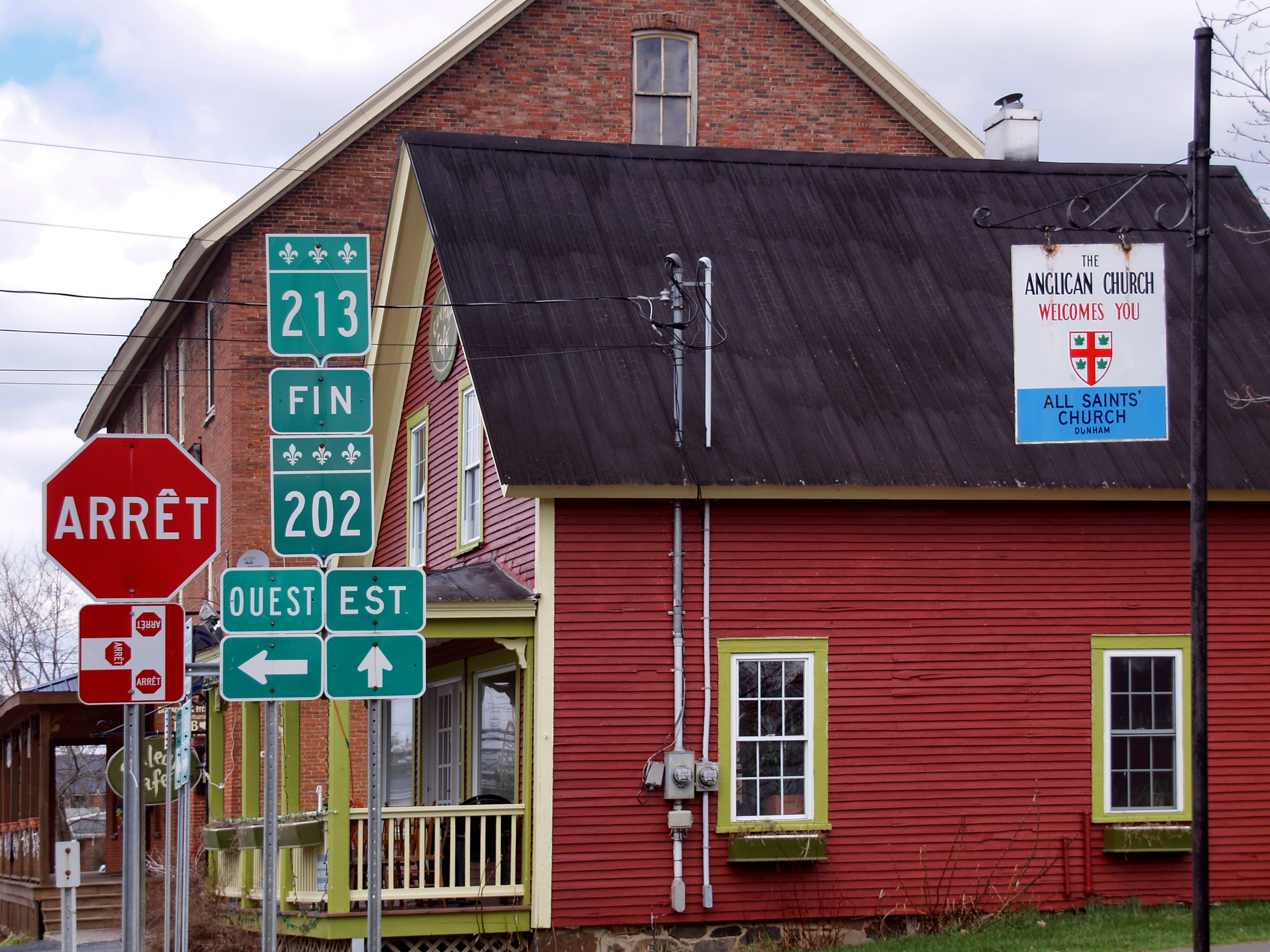
Junction with route 213 in Dunham.

== Major intersections ==
RCM or ET	Municipality	Km	Junction	Notes
Western terminus of Route 202
Le Haut-Saint-Laurent	Sainte-Barbe	0.0	R-132	132 WEST: to Saint-Anicet; 132 EAST: to Saint-Stanislas-de-Kosta
Le Haut-Saint-Laurent	Huntingdon	10.0; 10.3	R-138 (Overlap 0.3 km)	138 EAST: to Ormstown; 138 WEST: to Godmanchester
Le Haut-Saint-Laurent	Hinchinbrooke	20.0	Chemin Herdman	SOUTH: to NY 374 in Chateaugay, New York
Le Haut-Saint-Laurent	Franklin	33.8	R-209	209 SOUTH: to NY 189 in Clinton, New York; 209 NORTH: to Saint-Chrysostome
Le Haut-Saint-Laurent	Franklin	38.6	R-201 (South end)	201 NORTH: to Ormstown
Le Haut-Saint-Laurent	Havelock	47.1	R-203	203 SOUTH: to Cannon Corners Rd. Mooers, New York; 203 NORTH: to Saint-Chrysostome
Les Jardins-de-Napierville	Hemmingford Village	60.5	R-219	219 SOUTH: to County Road 22, Mooers, New York; 219 NORTH: to Hemmingford (township)
Les Jardins-de-Napierville	Saint-Bernard-de-Lacolle	72.8; 73.2	A-15 (Overlap 0.4 km)	15 SOUTH: to I-87 in Champlain, New York; 15 NORTH: to Saint-Cyprien-de-Napierville
Les Jardins-de-Napierville	Saint-Bernard-de-Lacolle	74.7	R-217	217 SOUTH: to A-15; 217 NORTH: to Saint-Cyprien-de-Napierville
Le Haut-Richelieu	Lacolle	79.1; 80.3	R-221 (Overlap 1.2 km)	221 SOUTH: to NY 276 in Champlain, New York; 221 NORTH: to Napierville
Le Haut-Richelieu	Lacolle	83.0	R-223	223 SOUTH: to US 11 in Champlain, New York; 223 NORTH: to Saint-Paul-de-l'Île-aux-Noix
Le Haut-Richelieu	Clarenceville	86.5	R-225	225 SOUTH: to VT 225 in Alburgh, Vermont; 225 NORTH: to Sainte-Anne-de-Sabrevois
Le Haut-Richelieu	Venise-en-Quebec	100.0	R-227 (South end)	227 NORTH: to Saint-Sébastien
Brome-Missisquoi	Pike River	109.1; 110.0	R-133 (Overlap 0.9 km)	133 NORTH: to Saint-Sébastien; 133 SOUTH: to Pike River
Brome-Missisquoi	Bedford	116.5; 116.6	R-235	235 NORTH: to Sainte-Sabine; 235 SOUTH: to Saint-Armand
Brome-Missisquoi	Stanbridge-East	123.0	R-237 (North end)	237 SOUTH: to Frelighsburg
Brome-Missisquoi	Dunham	132.7	R-213 (North end)	213 SOUTH: to Frelighsburg
Brome-Missisquoi	Cowansville	140.5	R-104; R-139	104 WEST: to Brigham; 104 EAST: to Lac-Brome; 139 SOUTH: to Sutton; 139 NORTH: to East Farnham
Eastern terminus of Route 202

== See also ==
- List of Quebec provincial highways
