= Quebec Route 227 =

Highway in Quebec, Canada

Route 227

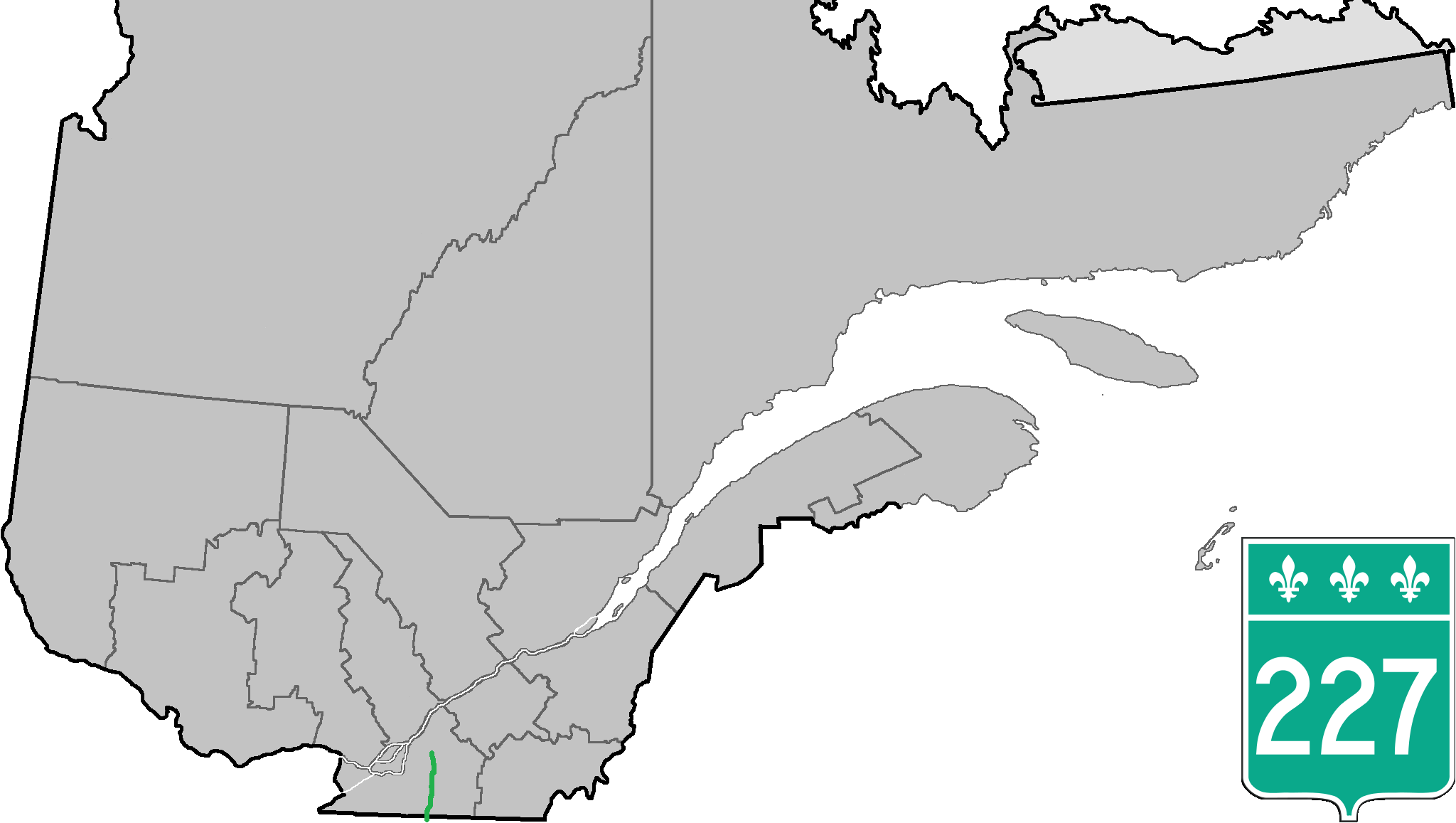

Route information
- Maintained by Transports Québec
- Length: 65.6 km (40.8 mi)

Major junctions
- South end: R-202 in Venise-en-Québec
- R-133 in Saint-Sébastien; R-104 in Mont-Saint-Grégoire; A-10 / R-112 in Marieville; R-229 in Saint-Jean-Baptiste; R-116 in Sainte-Madeleine
- North end: A-20 (TCH) in Sainte-Marie-Madeleine

Location
- Country: Canada
- Province: Quebec

Highway system
- Quebec provincial highways; Autoroutes; List; Former
← R-226	→ R-228

Route 227 is a provincial highway located in the Montérégie region of Quebec. The highway runs from Venise-en-Québec at the junction of Route 202 in the northwestern shores of Lake Champlain and ends at the junction of Autoroute 20 in Sainte-Marie-Madeleine, near Mont-Saint-Hilaire. It briefly overlaps Route 229 in Saint-Jean-Baptiste.

== Municipalities along Route 227 ==
- Venise-en-Québec
- Saint-Sébastien
- Saint-Alexandre
- Mont-Saint-Grégoire
- Sainte-Brigide-d'Iberville
- Sainte-Angèle-de-Monnoir
- Marieville
- Saint-Jean-Baptiste
- Sainte-Madeleine
- Sainte-Marie-Madeleine
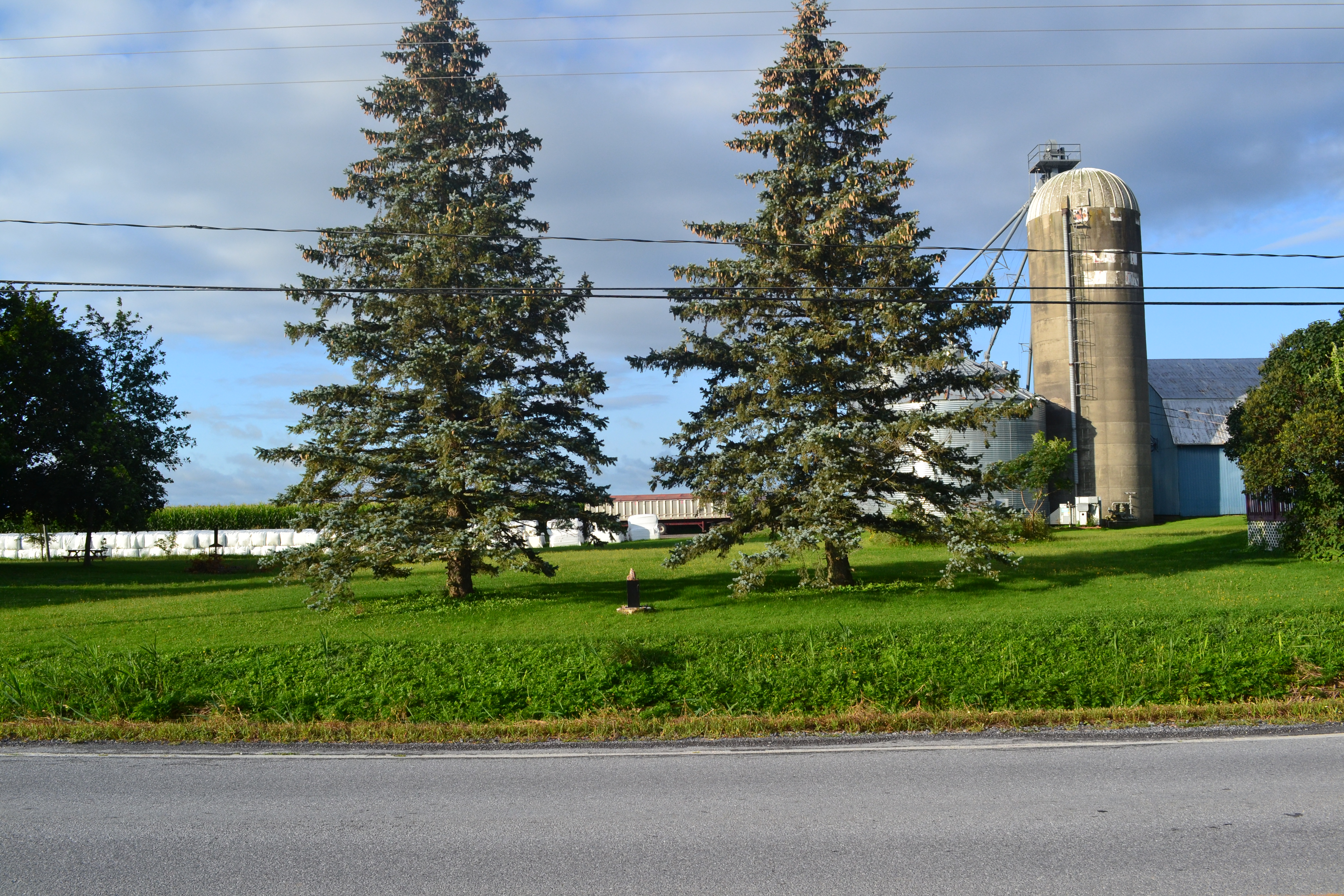
Rural scene along Route 227 in Saint-Alexandre.

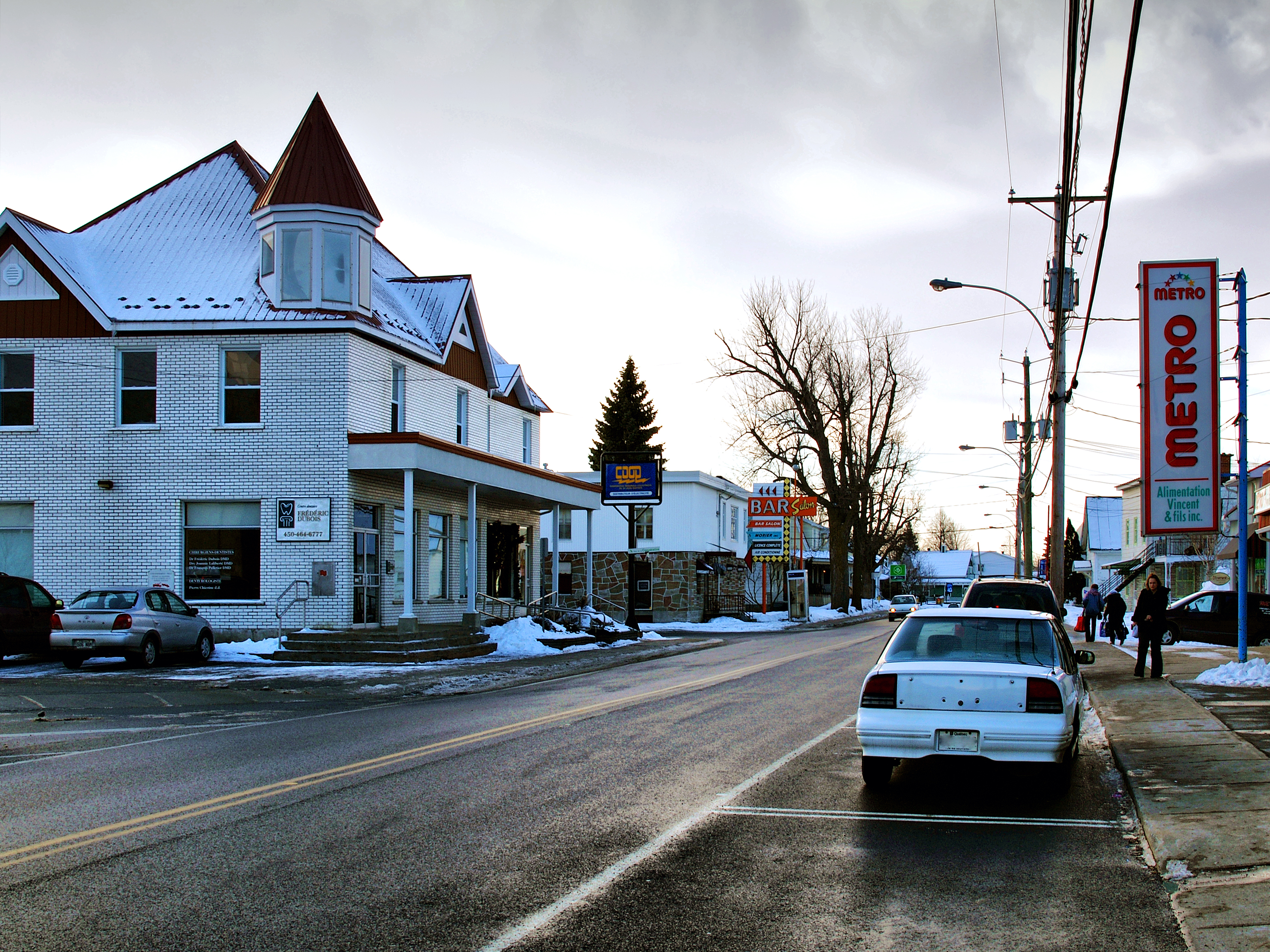
Route 227 is concurrent with Principale street in Saint-Jean-Baptiste.

== See also ==
- List of Quebec provincial highways
