= Saint-Antoine-sur-Richelieu =

- Municipality
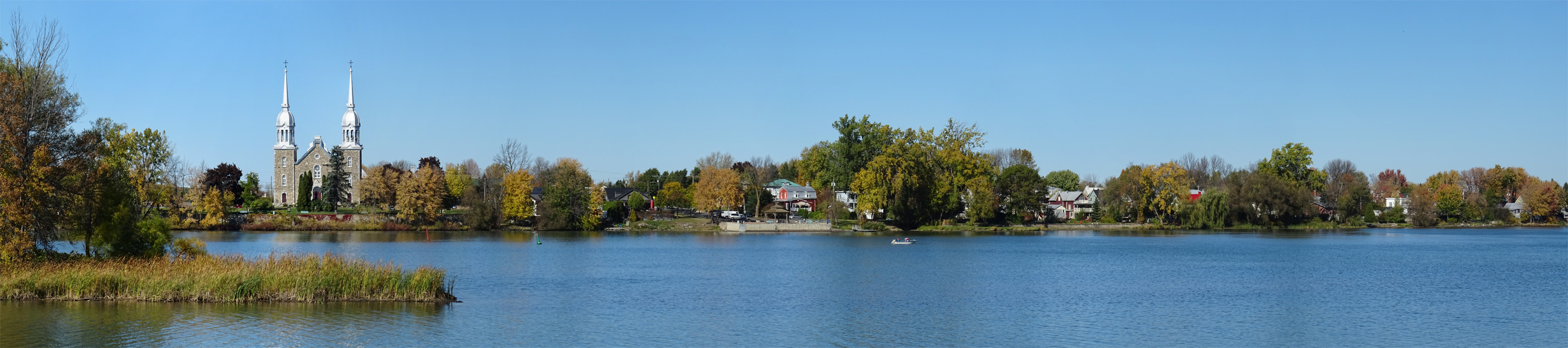
- Saint-Antoine-sur-Richelieu seen from the river

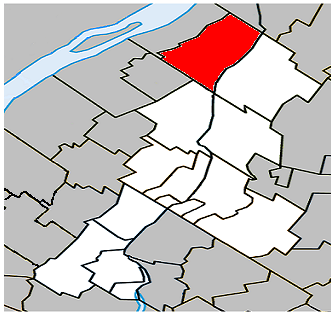
- Location within La Vallée-du-Richelieu RCM

- Location in southern Quebec
- Coordinates: 45°47′N 73°11′W
- Country: Canada
- Province: Quebec
- Region: Montérégie
- RCM: La Vallée-du-Richelieu
- Constituted: November 6, 1982

Government
  - Mayor: Jonathan Chalifoux
  - Federal riding: Verchères—Les Patriotes
  - Prov. riding: Borduas

Area
  - Total: 67.90 km^{2} (26.22 sq mi)
  - Land: 65.67 km^{2} (25.36 sq mi)

Population (2021)
  - Total: 1,738
  - Density: 26.5/km^{2} (69/sq mi)
  - Pop 2016-2021: ▲2.6%
  - Dwellings: 752
- Time zone: UTC−5 (EST)
  - Summer (DST): UTC−4 (EDT)
- Postal code(s): J0L 1R0
- Area codes: 450 and 579
- Highways: R-223
- Website: www.saint-antoine-sur-richelieu.ca

Saint-Antoine-sur-Richelieu (French pronunciation: [sɛ̃t‿ɑ̃twan syʁ ʁiʃ(ə)ljø], lit. 'Saint-Antoine on Richelieu') is a municipality in southwestern Quebec, Canada, on the Richelieu River in the Regional County Municipality of La Vallée-du-Richelieu. The population as of the Canada 2021 Census was 1,738.

Saint-Antoine-sur-Richelieu was the birthplace of one of the Fathers of Confederation, George-Étienne Cartier.

== Demographics ==
=== Population ===
Population trend:

Census	Population	Change (%)
2021	1,738	▲2.6%
2016	1,694	▲2.1%
2011	1,659	▲4.1%
2006	1,594	▲4.9%
2001	1,519	▼0.9%
1996	1,533	▼2.7%
1991	1,576	▲5.1%
1986	1,500	▲66.1%
1981	903	▲18.2%
1976	764	▲9.3%
1971	699	▼4.1%
1966	729	▼0.1%
1961	730	▲1.4%
1956	720	▼2.8%
1951	741	▼10.9%
1941	832	▲3.9%
1931	801	N/A

=== Language ===
Mother tongue language (2021)

Language	Population	Pct (%)
French only	1,670	97.1%
English only	30	1.7%
Both English and French	10	0.6%
Other languages	15	0.9%

== See also ==
- List of municipalities in Quebec
