= Venise-en-Québec =

- Municipality
- Venise-en-Québec in 2026

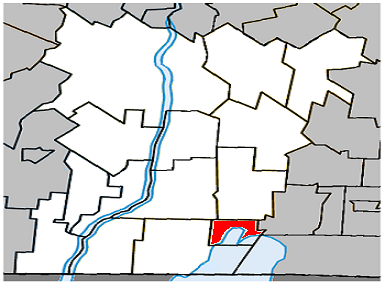
- Location within Le Haut-Richelieu RCM

- Location in southern Quebec
- Coordinates: 45°05′N 73°08′W
- Country: Canada
- Province: Quebec
- Region: Montérégie
- RCM: Le Haut-Richelieu
- Constituted: January 1, 1950

Government
  - Mayor: Jacques Landry
  - Federal riding: Brome—Missisquoi
  - Prov. riding: Iberville

Area
  - Total: 20.30 km^{2} (7.84 sq mi)
  - Land: 13.13 km^{2} (5.07 sq mi)

Population (2021)
  - Total: 1,899
  - Density: 144.7/km^{2} (375/sq mi)
  - Pop 2016-2021: ▲16.2%
  - Dwellings: 1,173
- Time zone: UTC−5 (EST)
  - Summer (DST): UTC−4 (EDT)
- Postal code(s): J0J 2K0
- Area codes: 450 and 579
- Highways: R-202; R-227
- Website: veniseenquebec.ca

Venise-en-Québec (French pronunciation: [vəniz ɑ̃ kebɛk], lit. 'Venice in Quebec') is a municipality in the province of Quebec, Canada, located at the north end of Lake Champlain in the Regional County Municipality of Le Haut-Richelieu. The population as of the Canada 2021 Census was 1,899.

== Demographics ==
=== Population ===
Canada census – Venise-en-Québec community profile

| | 2021 | 2016 | 2011 |
| Population | 1,899 (+16.2% from 2016) | 1,634 (+5.6% from 2011) | 1,547 (+17.3% from 2006) |
| Land area | 13.13 km^{2} (5.07 sq mi) | 13.23 km^{2} (5.11 sq mi) | 13.24 km^{2} (5.11 sq mi) |
| Population density | 144.7/km^{2} (375/sq mi) | 123.5/km^{2} (320/sq mi) | 116.9/km^{2} (303/sq mi) |
| Median age | 59.2 (M: 60.0, F: 58.8) | 58.2 (M: 58.2, F: 58.3) | 55.1 (M: 54.1, F: 56.2) |
| Private dwellings | 1,173 (total) | 1,099 (total) | 1,036 (total) |
| Median household income | $68,000 | $53,931 | $49,988 |

References: 2021 2016 2011

Historical Census Data - Venise-en-Québec, Quebec
| Year | Pop. | ±% |
|---|---|---|
| 1951 | 173 | — |
| 1956 | 197 | +13.9% |
| 1961 | 264 | +34.0% |
| 1966 | 291 | +10.2% |
| 1971 | 502 | +72.5% |
| 1976 | 628 | +25.1% |
| 1981 | 810 | +29.0% |
| 1986 | 791 | −2.3% |
| 1991 | 934 | +18.1% |
| 1996 | 1,108 | +18.6% |
| 2001 | 1,243 | +12.2% |
| 2006 | 1,319 | +6.1% |
| 2011 | 1,547 | +17.3% |
| 2016 | 1,634 | +5.6% |
| 2021 | 1,899 | +16.2% |

=== Language ===
Canada Census Mother Tongue - Venise-en-Québec, Quebec
| Census | Total | French | | | English | | | French & English | | | Other | | |
| Year | Responses | Count | Trend | Pop % | Count | Trend | Pop % | Count | Trend | Pop % | Count | Trend | Pop % |
| 2021 | 1,895 | 1,720 | ▲18.2% | 90.8% | 110 | 0.0% | 5.8% | 25 | ▲150.0% | 1.3% | 40 | ▼11.1% | 2.1% |
| 2016 | 1,625 | 1,455 | ▲7.8% | 89.5% | 110 | ▼8.3% | 6.8% | 10 | ▼60.0% | 0.6% | 45 | 0.0% | 2.8% |
| 2011 | 1,540 | 1,350 | ▲16.4% | 87.7% | 120 | ▲41.2% | 7.8% | 25 | ▲ n/a% | 1.6% | 45 | ▼30.8% | 2.9% |
| 2006 | 1,310 | 1,160 | ▲10.5% | 88.6% | 85 | ▼39.3% | 6.5% | 0 | ▼100.0% | 0.0% | 65 | ▲44.4% | 5.0% |
| 2001 | 1,245 | 1,050 | ▲7.1% | 84.3% | 140 | ▲47.4% | 11.3% | 10 | ▼66.7% | 0.8% | 45 | ▲ n/a% | 3.6% |
| 1996 | 1,105 | 980 | n/a | 88.7% | 95 | n/a | 8.6% | 30 | n/a | 2.7% | 0 | n/a | 0.0% |

== See also ==
- List of municipalities in Quebec
