= Mont-Saint-Grégoire =

- Municipality
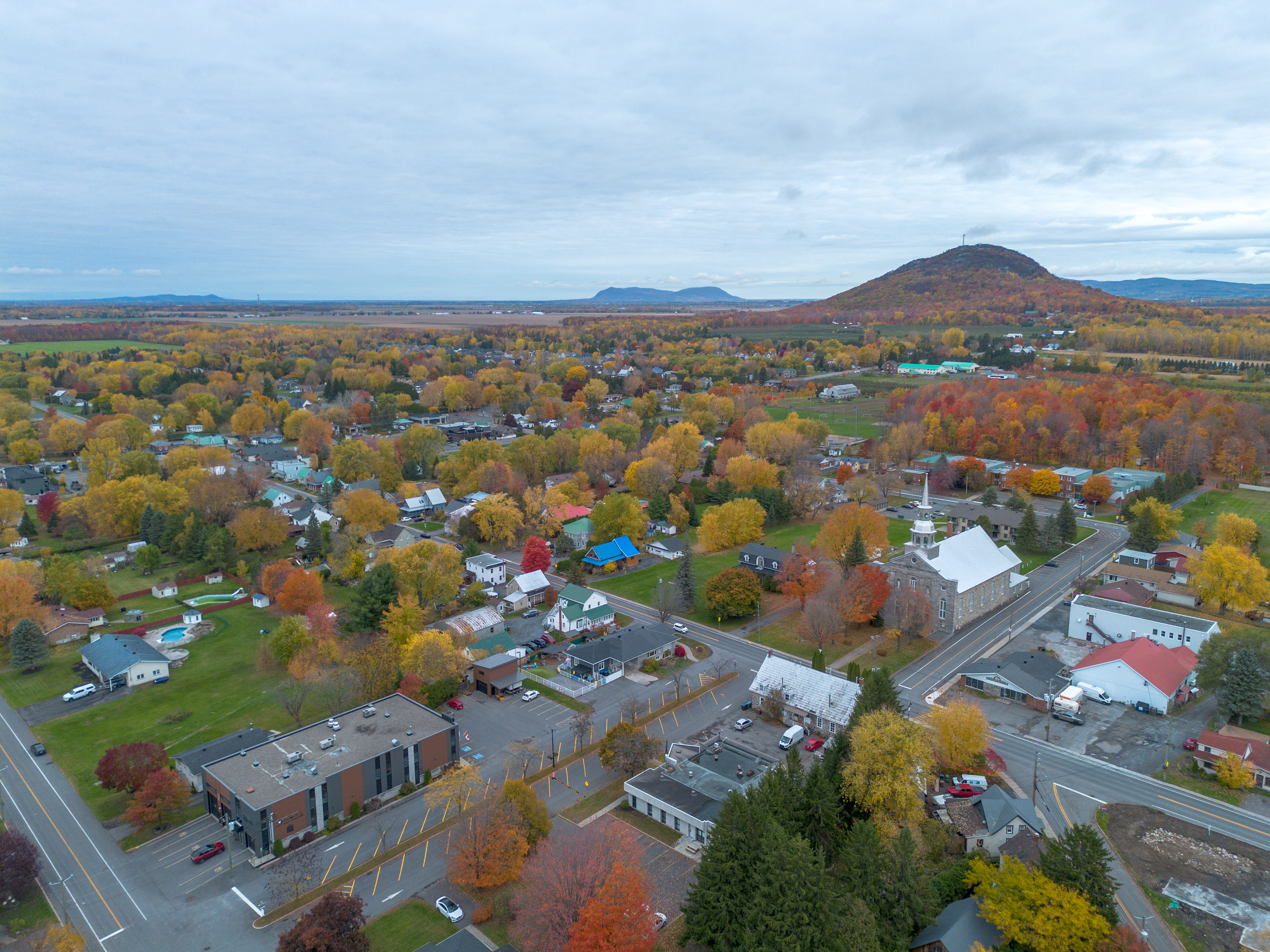
- Mont-Saint-Grégoire in 2025

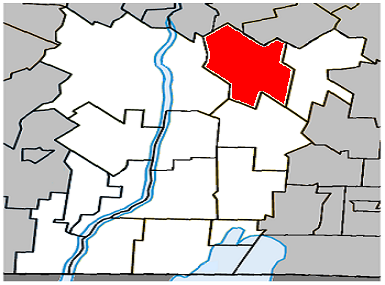
- Location within Le Haut-Richelieu RCM

- Location in southern Quebec
- Coordinates: 45°20′N 73°10′W
- Country: Canada
- Province: Quebec
- Region: Montérégie
- RCM: Le Haut-Richelieu
- Constituted: December 21, 1994

Government
  - Mayor: Suzanne Boulais
  - Federal riding: Saint-Jean
  - Prov. riding: Iberville

Area
  - Total: 81.40 km^{2} (31.43 sq mi)
  - Land: 79.83 km^{2} (30.82 sq mi)

Population (2021)
  - Total: 3,136
  - Density: 39.3/km^{2} (102/sq mi)
  - Pop 2016-2021: ▲1.9%
  - Dwellings: 1,226
- Time zone: UTC−5 (EST)
  - Summer (DST): UTC−4 (EDT)
- Postal code(s): J0J 1K0
- Area codes: 450 and 579
- Highways: R-104; R-227
- Website: www.mont-saint-gregoire.ca

Mont-Saint-Grégoire (French pronunciation: [mɔ̃ sɛ̃ ɡʁeɡwaʁ]) is a municipality in the province of Quebec, Canada, located in the Regional County Municipality of Le Haut-Richelieu, Montérégie. The population as of the Canada 2021 Census was 3,136. Residents of Mont-Saint-Grégoire are called Grégoriens (Grégoriennes, fem.).

== History ==
Mont-Saint-Grégoire was named for Gregory the Great, pope from 590 to 604, who was succeeded by Sabinian.

Saint André Bessette was born in Mont-Saint-Grégoire.

== Geography ==
The municipality has the privilege of having on its territory Mont Saint-Grégoire, a small Monteregian hill whose summit reaches 251 meters. The mountain is largely covered by a sugar maple forest, offering magnificent fall colors.

All around there are only flat lands occupied by apple orchards, corn, soya and other cereal crops. On the horizon emerge the agricultural silos of dairy farms.

Its territory is crossed by the important Route 104 which connects La Prairie to Lac-Brome via the nearby city of Saint-Jean-sur-Richelieu.

== Demographics ==
=== Population ===
Canada census – Mont-Saint-Grégoire community profile

	2021	2016	2011
Population	3,136 (+1.9% from 2016)	3,077 (-0.3% from 2011)	3,086 (+5.6% from 2006)
Land area	79.83 km^{2} (30.82 sq mi)	79.97 km^{2} (30.88 sq mi)	79.63 km^{2} (30.75 sq mi)
Population density	39.3/km^{2} (102/sq mi)	38.5/km^{2} (100/sq mi)	38.8/km^{2} (100/sq mi)
Median age	42.4 (M: 42.0, F: 43.2)	43 (M: 43.9, F: 42)	41.4 (M: 41.7, F: 41.2)
Private dwellings	1,226 (total) 1,187 (occupied)	1,192 (total)	1,158 (total)
Median household income	$96,000	$78,117	$71,462

References: 2021 2016 2011

Historical Census Data - Mont-Saint-Grégoire, Quebec

Year	Pop.	±%
1996	3,112	—
2001	3,102	−0.3%

Year	Pop.	±%
2006	2,922	−5.8%
2011	3,086	+5.6%

Year	Pop.	±%
2016	3,077	−0.3%
2021	3,136	+1.9%

=== Language ===
Canada Census Mother Tongue - Mont-Saint-Grégoire, Quebec
Census	Total	French			English			French & English			Other		
Year	Responses	Count	Trend	Pop %	Count	Trend	Pop %	Count	Trend	Pop %	Count	Trend	Pop %
2021	3,140	2,995	▲1.4%	95.4%	60	▲20.0%	1.9%	35	▲133.3%	1.1%	40	▼11.1%	1.3%
2016	3,070	2,955	▼0.7%	96.3%	50	0.0%	1.6%	15	▼25.0%	0.5%	45	▲50.0%	1.5%
2011	3,075	2,975	▲6.4%	96.8%	50	▲100.0%	1.6%	20	▲100.0%	0.7%	30	▼60.0%	1.0%
2006	2,905	2,795	▼6.7%	96.2%	25	▲66.7%	0.9%	10	▼60.0%	0.3%	75	▲25.0%	2.6%
2001	3,095	2,995	▼0.3%	96.8%	15	▼72.7%	0.5%	25	▲ n/a%	0.8%	60	▲100.0%	1.9%
1996	3,090	3,005	n/a	97.3%	55	n/a	1.8%	0	n/a	0.0%	30	n/a	1.0%

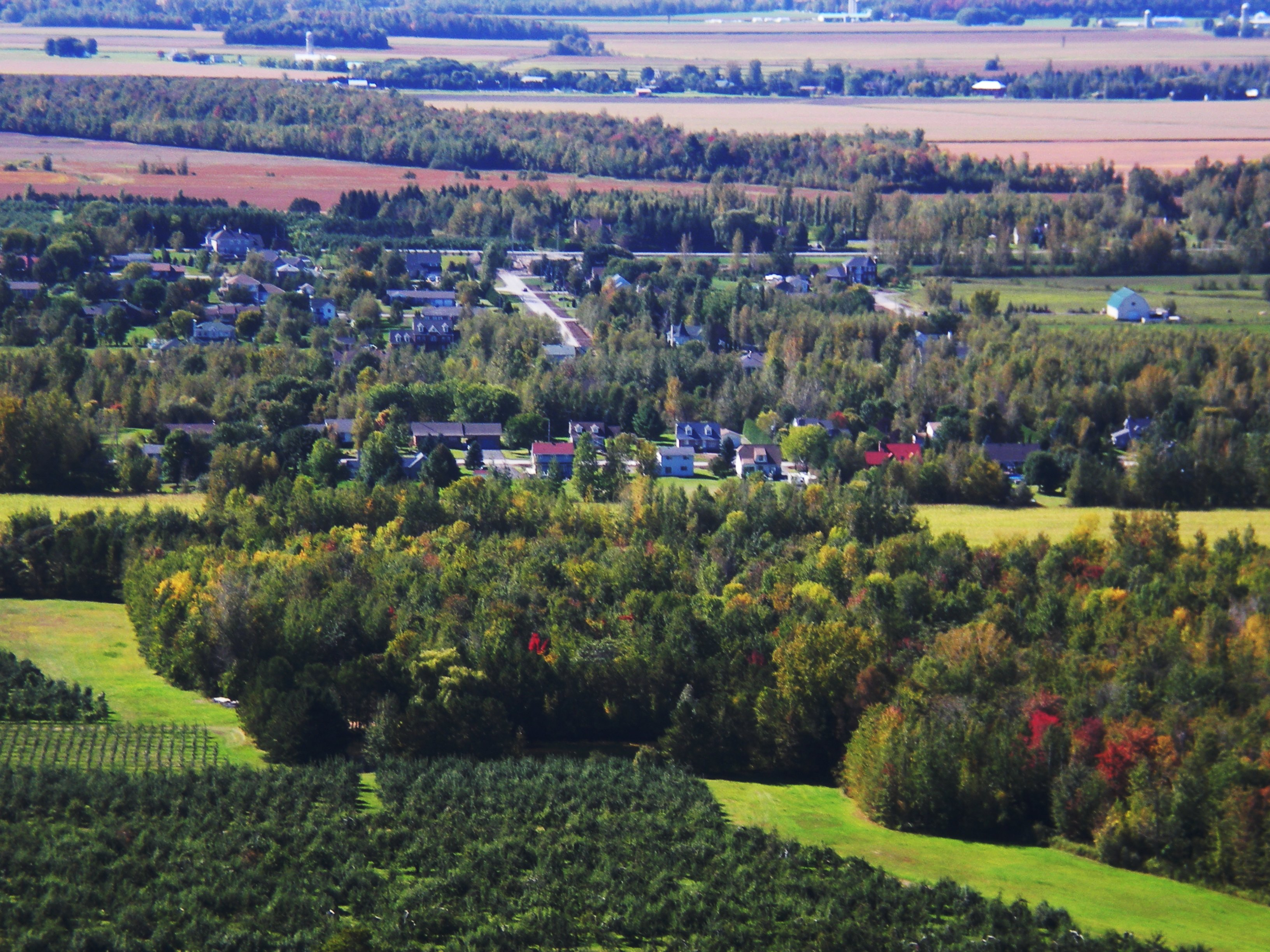
View of St-Grégoire 2009

== See also ==
- List of municipalities in Quebec
