= Saint-Alexandre, Quebec =

Saint-Alexandre
- Municipality
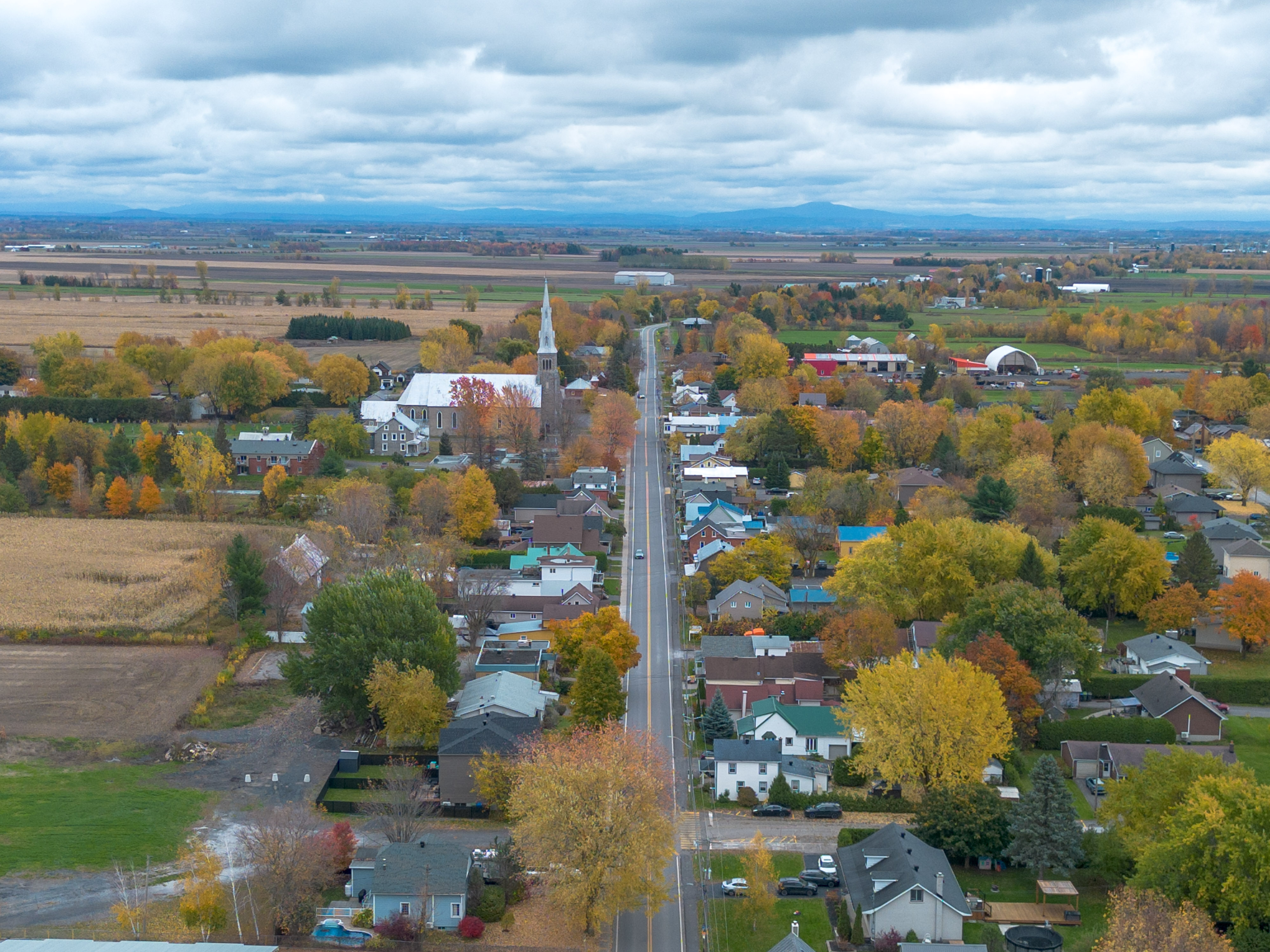
- Saint-Alexandre in 2025
- Motto: La fidélité et la foi triomphent (Latin: Fidelitas et fides vincunt)
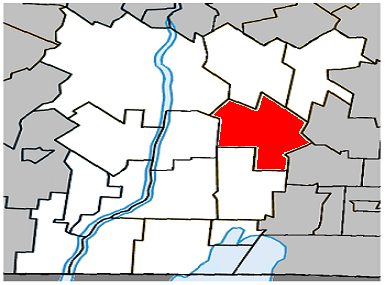
- Location within Le Haut-Richelieu RCM

- Location in southern Quebec
- Coordinates: 45°14′N 73°07′W
- Country: Canada
- Province: Quebec
- Region: Montérégie
- RCM: Le Haut-Richelieu
- Constituted: September 17, 1988

Government
  - Mayor: André Bergeron
  - Federal riding: Saint-Jean
  - Prov. riding: Iberville

Area
  - Total: 76.30 km^{2} (29.46 sq mi)
  - Land: 76.16 km^{2} (29.41 sq mi)

Population (2011)
  - Total: 2,495
  - Density: 32.8/km^{2} (85/sq mi)
  - Pop 2006-2011: ▲6.6%
  - Dwellings: 938
- Time zone: UTC−5 (EST)
  - Summer (DST): UTC−4 (EDT)
- Postal code(s): J0J 1S0
- Area codes: 450 and 579
- Highways: R-227
- Website: www.saint-alexandre.ca

Saint-Alexandre (French pronunciation: [sɛ̃t‿alɛksɑ̃dʁ]) is a municipality in the province of Quebec, Canada, located in the Regional County Municipality of Le Haut-Richelieu. The population as of the Canada 2011 Census was 2,495. Residents of Saint-Alexandre are called Alexandrins (Alexandrines, fem.).

== History ==
Saint-Alexandre was named for Alexander, bishop of Alexandria from 313 to 328, who was succeeded by Athanasius.

== Demographics ==
Population

Canada census – Saint-Alexandre community profile

	2021	2011
Population	2,678 (+8.5% from 2016)	2,495 (+6.6% from 2006)
Land area	76.27 km^{2} (29.45 sq mi)	76.16 km^{2} (29.41 sq mi)
Population density	35.1/km^{2} (91/sq mi)	32.8/km^{2} (85/sq mi)
Median age	37.2 (M: 38, F: 36.8)	35.0 (M: 35.1, F: 35.0)
Private dwellings	1,005 (total)	938 (total)
Median household income		$60,675

References: 2021 2011

Historical Census Data - Saint-Alexandre, Quebec
Year	Pop.	±%
1991	1,954	—
1996	2,380	+21.8%
2001	2,388	+0.3%
2006	2,340	−2.0%
2011	2,495	+6.6%

Language

Canada Census Mother Tongue - Saint-Alexandre, Quebec
Census	Total	French			English			French & English			Other		
Year	Responses	Count	Trend	Pop %	Count	Trend	Pop %	Count	Trend	Pop %	Count	Trend	Pop %
2011	2,500	2,370	▲11.5%	94.80%	65	▲116.7%	2.60%	15	▲50.0%	0.60%	50	▼70.6%	2.00%
2006	2,335	2,125	▼7.6%	91.01%	30	▲20.0%	1.28%	10	▼77.8%	0.43%	170	▲750.0%	7.28%
2001	2,390	2,300	▲3.6%	96.23%	25	▼64.3%	1.05%	45	▲350.0%	1.88%	20	▼73.3%	0.84%
1996	2,375	2,220	n/a	93.47%	70	n/a	2.95%	10	n/a	0.42%	75	n/a	3.16%

== See also ==
- List of municipalities in Quebec
