= Rivière aux Brochets =

Rivière aux Brochets may refer to:

== Places ==
- Pike River (Missisquoi Bay tributary) (French: Rivière aux Brochets), in Quebec, Canada and Vermont, United States
  - North Pike River (Pike River tributary) (French: Rivière aux Brochets Nord), in Montérégie, Quebec, Canada
  - Rivière-aux-Brochets Ecological Reserve, in the Brome-Missisquoi Regional County Municipality, Montérégie, Quebec, Canada
- Rivière aux Brochets (Lac-Masketsi), a tributary of the rivière du Milieu in Mauricie, Quebec, Canada
- Rivière aux Brochets (Ashuapmushuan River tributary), Saguenay–Lac-Saint-Jean, Quebec, Canada
