= North Pike River (Pike River tributary) =

- Native name: Rivière aux Brochets Nord (French)

Location
- Country: Canada
- Province: Quebec
- Region: Estrie
- Regional County Municipality: Brome-Missisquoi Regional County Municipality

Physical characteristics
- Source: Marsh area located west of Lac Selby
  - location: Dunham
  - coordinates: 45.099089°N 72.83801°W
  - elevation: 145 m (476 ft)
- Mouth: Pike River (Missisquoi Bay tributary)
  - location: Stanbridge East
  - coordinates: 45.12833°N 72.92361°W
- Length: 18.3 km (11.4 mi)

Basin features
- Progression: Pike River (Missisquoi Bay tributary), Missisquoi Bay, Lake Champlain, Richelieu River, St. Lawrence River
- Tributaries
  - left: (Upstream) Letellier-Plante stream, Aza-Breault stream, Craig-Breault branch.
  - right: (Upstream) Dextraze brook, Demers brook, Béranger junction, Noiseaux brook.

The Rivière aux Brochets Nord (English: North Pike River) is a tributary of the Pike River (French: Rivière aux Brochets). This watercourse crosses the territory of the municipalities of Dunham and Stanbridge East in the Brome-Missisquoi Regional County Municipality, in the administrative region of Montérégie, in the province of Quebec, in Canada.

The river surface is generally frozen from mid-December to the end of March. Safe traffic on the ice is generally from late December to early March. The water level of the river varies with the seasons and the precipitation.

== Geography ==
The hydrographic slopes neighboring the "Brochets river north" are:

- north side: Yamaska River;
- east side: Gear Creek;
- south side: Pike River (Missisquoi Bay tributary);
- west side: Pike River (Missisquoi Bay tributary).

The "Rivière aux Brochets Nord" originates from a small marsh area (1.2 km (0.75 mi) long, located between two mountains and in a forest area) in the southern part of the territory of Dunham. This area is located west of Selby Lake, southwest of the village of Dunham, west of route 213), at south of route 202 (Bruce road) and west of route 237.

From this marsh, the course of this river flows on:

- 2.7 km (1.7 mi) north to route 202 which the river crosses 2.7 km (1.7 mi) west of the village of Dunham;
- 3.1 km (1.9 mi) north to Chemin de Maska;
- 1.1 km (0.68 mi) northwest to Noiseux stream (coming from the east);
- 2.0 km (1.2 mi) west to route 237 (chemin du 10e rang);
- 3.2 km (2.0 mi) west to a country road that the river crosses near the hamlet Pearceton;
- 1.7 km (1.1 mi) west to Dextraze stream (coming from the north);
- 4.5 km (2.8 mi) south-west in an agricultural area to its mouth.

The "Rivière aux Brochets Nord" flows onto the north shore of the Pike River (Rivière aux Brochets), just north of the village of Stanbridge East.

== Toponymy ==
The toponym "Rivière aux Brochets Nord" was formalized on December 5, 1968, at the Commission de toponymie du Québec.

== See also ==
- List of rivers of Quebec
