= Selby Lake =

- Lac Selby (French)

- Location within Quebec
- Location: Brome-Missisquoi, Montérégie, Quebec, Canada
- Coordinates: 45°05′42″N 72°48′06″W
- Type: Fresh water lake
- Primary inflows: Bérard Creek
- Primary outflows: Pike River
- Basin countries: Canada
- Max. length: 2 km (1.2 mi)
- Max. width: 0.8 km (0.50 mi)
- Surface area: 1.2 km^{2} (0.46 sq mi)
- Average depth: 1 metre (3.3 ft)
- Max. depth: 10 metres (33 ft)
- Surface elevation: 180 m (590 ft)
- Settlements: Dunham

Selby Lake (French: Lac Selby) is a freshwater lake located entirely in Dunham, a city in the Brome-Missisquoi Regional County Municipality of the Montérégie region of southern Quebec, Canada.

The lake is 2 km (1.2 mi) by 0.8 km (0.50 mi) wide, with an area of 1.2 km (0.75 mi). It has an average depth of 1 m (3 ft 3 in) and a maximum depth of 10 m (33 ft).

Selby Lake has historically been popular in the region for rowing and fishing, drawing people from Dunham and neighbouring Frelighsburg. Today, 183 homes and cottages border the lake.

The lake was found to be approaching a state of eutrophication in the 1970s. The lake's sanitation was improved, following the installation of a sewer system in Dunham in 1986–87, which replaced the septic tanks used previously. Additionally, the lake's condition ameliorated following the re-vegetation of the lakeshore, restoration of ditches, and the installation of sediment sensors and catchment basins by the city of Dunham in collaboration with the Association pour la protection de l’environnement du lac Selby (APELS).

In 2007, Selby Lake, along with other lakes in Quebec, were found to be contaminated with blue-green algae.

Selby Lake was mentioned in season 2, episode 12 (The Choice) of the American television drama series Homeland. Upon driving Nicholas Brody to near the Canada–United States border, Carrie Mathison instructed him to hike the rest of the way through the woods to meet with her friend June, who has a summer cabin at Lake Selby.
