= West Berkshire–Frelighsburg Border Crossing =

Canada–United States border crossing

West Berkshire-Frelighsburg Border Crossing
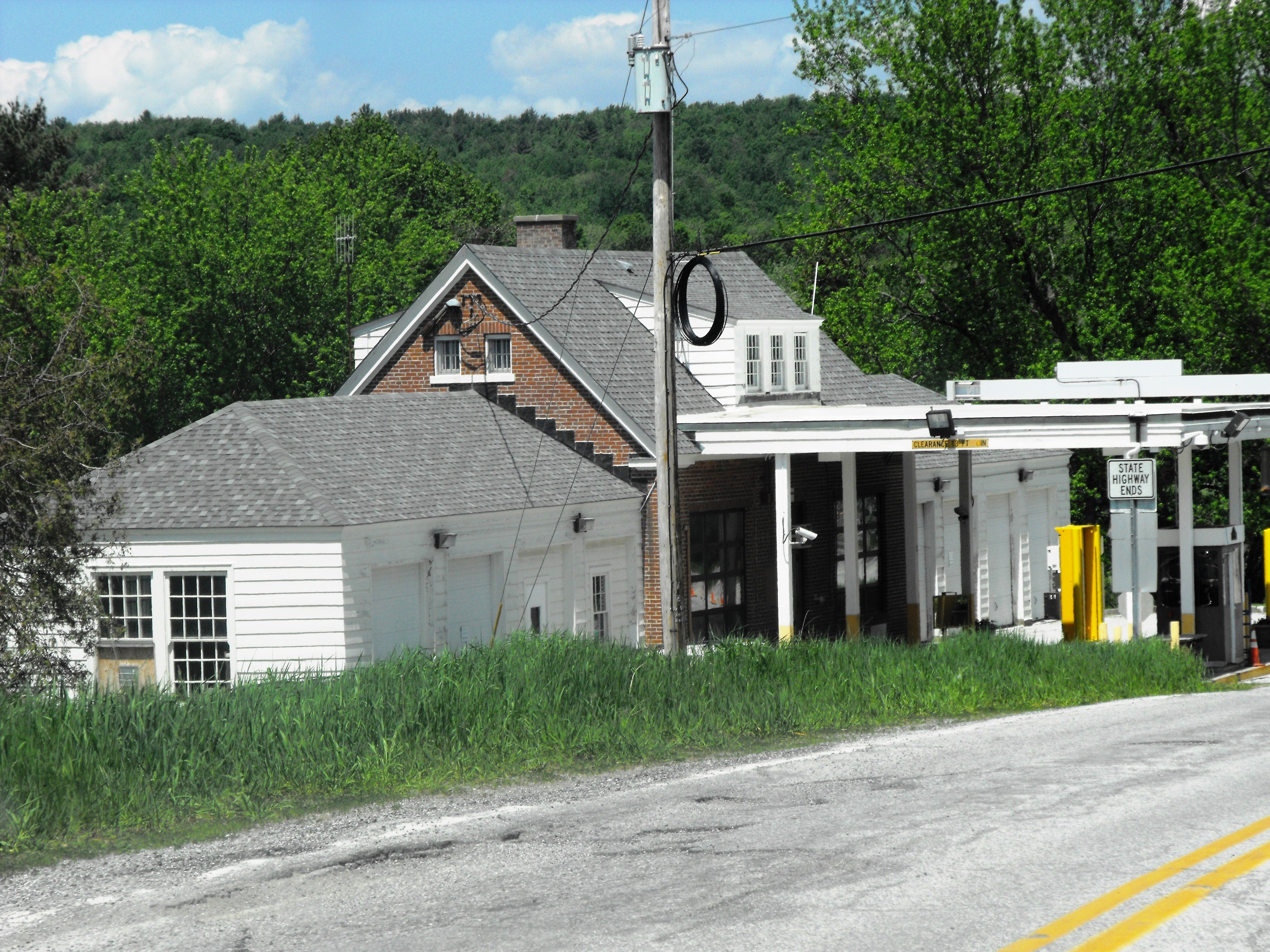
- US Border Inspection Station at West Berkshire, VT

Location
- Country: United States; Canada
- Location: VT 108 / R-237; US Port: 7823 W Berkshire Rd (VT 108), Berkshire, Vermont 05450; Canadian Port: 193 Route 237, Frelighsburg, Quebec J0J 1C0
- Coordinates: 45.016333°N 72.825623°W

Details
- Opened: 1935

Website
- United States web site; Canadian web site
- U.S. Inspection Station-West Berkshire, Vermont
- U.S. National Register of Historic Places
- MPS: U.S. Border Inspection Stations MPS
- NRHP reference No.: 14000606
- Added to NRHP: September 10, 2014

The West Berkshire–Frelighsburg Border Crossing connects the town of Frelighsburg, Quebec with the western portion of Berkshire, Vermont on the Canada–United States border. It is reached by Vermont Route 108 on the American side and by Quebec Route 237 on the Canadian side.

The US border station at this crossing was built in 1935, and was built as a Works Progress Administration effort to create jobs during the Great Depression, and has been listed on the National Register of Historic Places.

== Setting ==
The West Berkshire–Frelighsburg Border Crossing is located in a rural area of central northern Vermont and southern Quebec. Quebec Route 237 runs south from Frelighsburg, roughly paralleling the northbound course of the Pike River to its west. It meets Vermont Route 108 at the border, in an area dotted with farm properties and woodlands. The Canadian border station is directly north of the border, its facilities set between the north and southbound lanes of the road. The United States station is located about 200 feet (61 m) south of the border, on the west side of the road. Its property abuts both the border and the Pike River, which forms its western edge.

== Canadian border station ==
The current Canada border station was built in 1971. Early in the 20th century, many roads crossed into Canada at Frelighsburg, and the Canada Customs office was located in town, co-located with an insurance company at 50 Rue Principale. This building is still standing.

== United States border station and residences ==
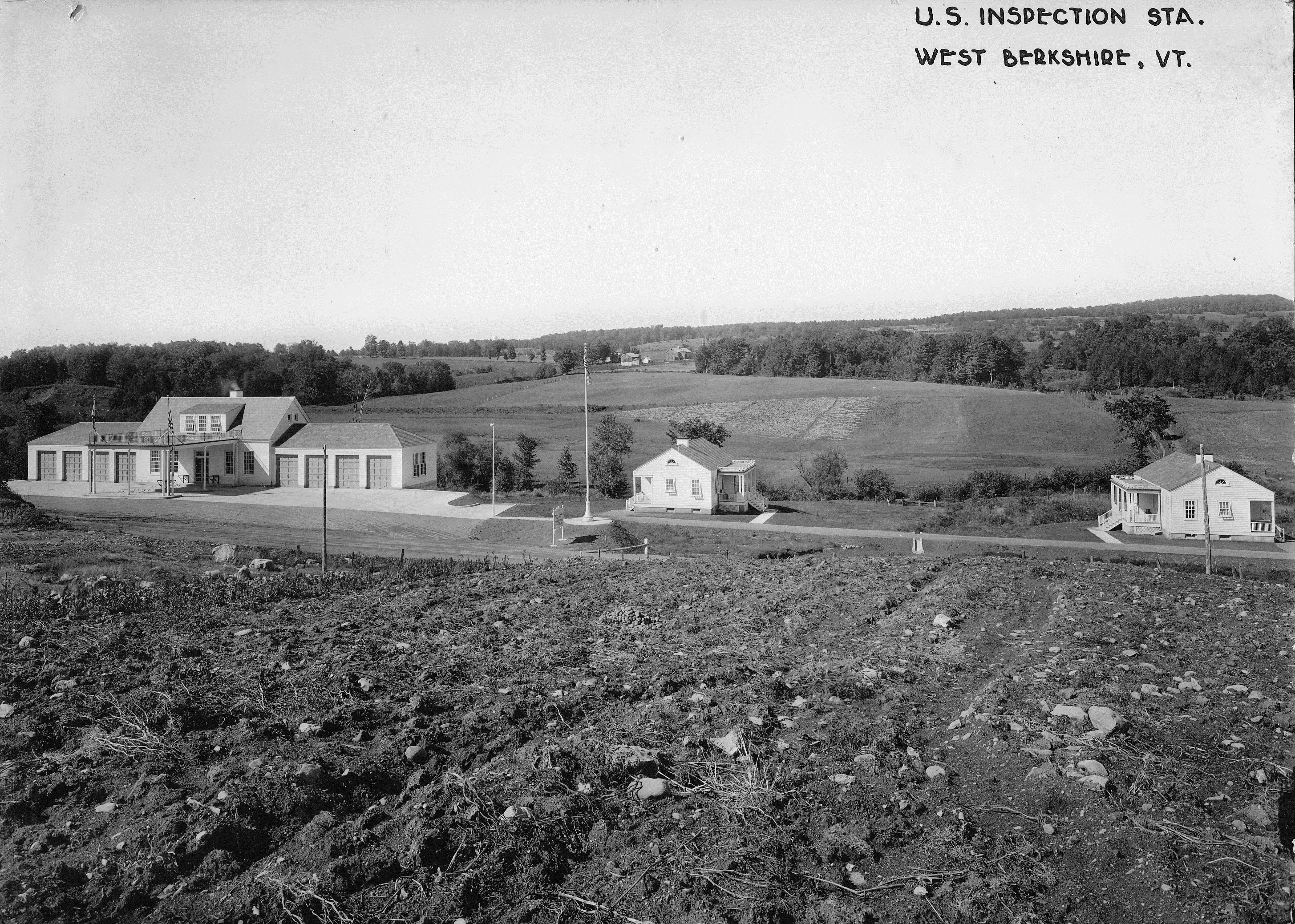
US border station and residences at West Berkshire, VT as seen in 1936

The United States station is a rectangular brick building, 1 1/2 stories in height, with a wooden-frame side gable roof. It is flanked on either side by four bays of garages, some of which have been enclosed and repurposed for other uses. A metal porte-cochere extends across one lane of roadway, providing shelter for arriving vehicles while they are processed. The main block has a three-bay facade, with large bay windows flanking a center entrance. The entrance provides access to roughly symmetrical facilities inside, one for customs, the other for immigration. Two of the garage bays on the south side have been enclosed, and now house restroom facilities. The attic space houses two detention cells, an office, and storage space. A short way northwest of the station is an abandoned Cape style house, one of two originally built to house officers of the station (the other has been demolished).

The station was one of thirteen border stations built in Vermont during the 1930s with funding support from the Public Works Administration, and is one of ten that survive. Of those ten, it is the only one to retain one of its original residences. This station was completed in 1934. Its construction was prompted by an increase in automobile traffic, and a rise in smuggling activities occasioned by the years of Prohibition in the 1920s, and illegal immigration across the northern border. The building's Colonial Revival style was considered representative of American values.

== See also ==
- List of Canada–United States border crossings
- National Register of Historic Places listings in Franklin County, Vermont
