= Nigger Rock =

Informal cemetery in Quebec, Canada

Coordinates: 45.0187°N 73.0504°W

Nigger Rock is an informal cemetery located on privately owned farmlands in the Eastern Townships of Quebec, Canada. The cemetery site is marked by a large black limestone that borders the fields. "Nigger Rock" was the burial place for enslaved Black and indentured people interred between 1783 and 1833.

The burial site is located in Saint-Armand, Quebec. An annual pilgrimage to the cemetery and the Philipsburg United Methodist Church is organised by The Black Coalition of Quebec each summer. The pilgrimage often occurs close to the date of August 1, which is recognised as Emancipation Day in Canada. The Philipsburg United Methodist Church and congregation participated in the Underground Railroad, providing refuge for Black fugitives fleeing enslavement. The church now operates as a privately owned museum, serving to protect the Black history of the region.
