= Polly Barber =

Polly Barber Scovill
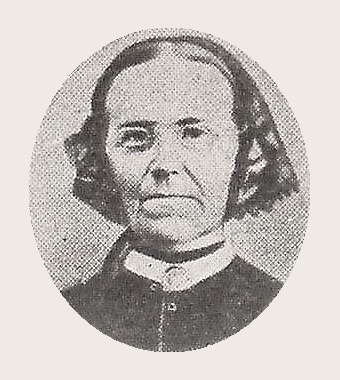
- Born: 25 September 1803; Saint-Armand, Lower Canada
- Died: 23 February 1898 (aged 95); Dunham, Quebec
- Citizenship: Canadian
- Occupation(s): Farmer, teacher, businesswoman
- Spouse: Stephen Scovill Jr

Polly Barber (also known by her married name, Polly Scovill; 25 September 1803 – 23 February 1898), was a teacher, farmer, and businesswoman, notable for becoming the "most prosperous farmer of Sutton," as stated by a newspaper after her death.

== Biography ==
=== Early life ===
Barber was born on September 25, 1803, in Saint-Armand, Lower Canada, to Asahel Barber and Polly Armes. Her father was the son of a physicist and her mother's family had many clergymen. Barber was able to use this situation to her advantage and became well-educated.

=== Teaching career ===
In 1820 Polly started her teaching career in Saint-Armand, giving lessons in private homes where she was making 4 livres a week. She paid for her room and board through weaving and other crafting activities to make money on the side. She moved to Sutton Township with her family, where she became the schoolmaster in 1834. As the schoolmaster, Barber made $1 a week in addition to room and board.

=== Farming career ===
Around 1834 Barber married Stephen Scovill Jr, a farmer from Sutton Township, who owned 250 acres of land. They were produced wool and cloth. Her husband died on November 7, 1847, leaving her a widow and pregnant at the age of 44. She continued developing the farm, raising children, and started a clothing factory. In 1861 her farm cost $5,000. She educated her daughters and her son, Smith, whom she established on land within the township. Later, because of health problems, she left the farm near Abercorn to her eldest daughter, Judith Smith.

She spent her last years with her daughter, Julia, and her son-in-law at Scottsmore in Dunham Township. On January 8, 1880, she wrote her last will and testament, dividing her property equally among her children. She died on February 23, 1898, at the age of 95.
