= Quebec Route 237 =

Highway in Quebec, Canada

Route 237

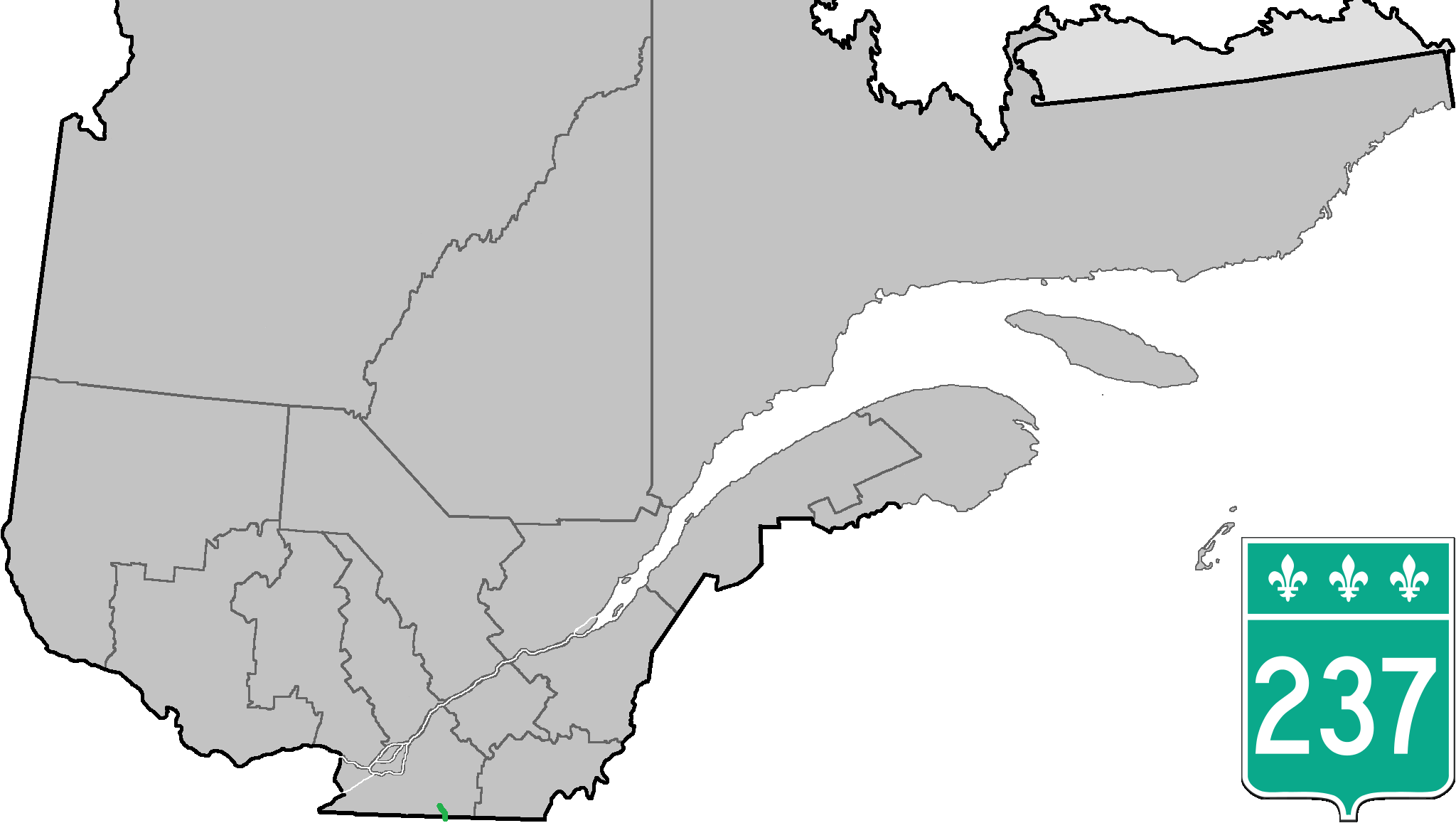

Route information
- Maintained by Transports Québec
- Length: 14.8 km (9.2 mi)

Major junctions
- South end: VT 108 at the U.S. border near Frelighsburg
- R-213 in Frelighsburg
- North end: R-202 in Stanbridge East

Location
- Country: Canada
- Province: Quebec

Highway system
- Quebec provincial highways; Autoroutes; List; Former
← R-236	→ R-239

Route 237 is a short 15 km north/south provincial highway on the south shore of the Saint Lawrence River in Quebec. Its northern terminus is in Stanbridge East at the junction of Route 202 and its southern terminus is in Frelighsburg, where it crosses the US border and continues past the West Berkshire–Frelighsburg Border Crossing into Vermont as Route 108.

== Municipalities along Route 237 ==
- Frelighsburg
- Stanbridge East
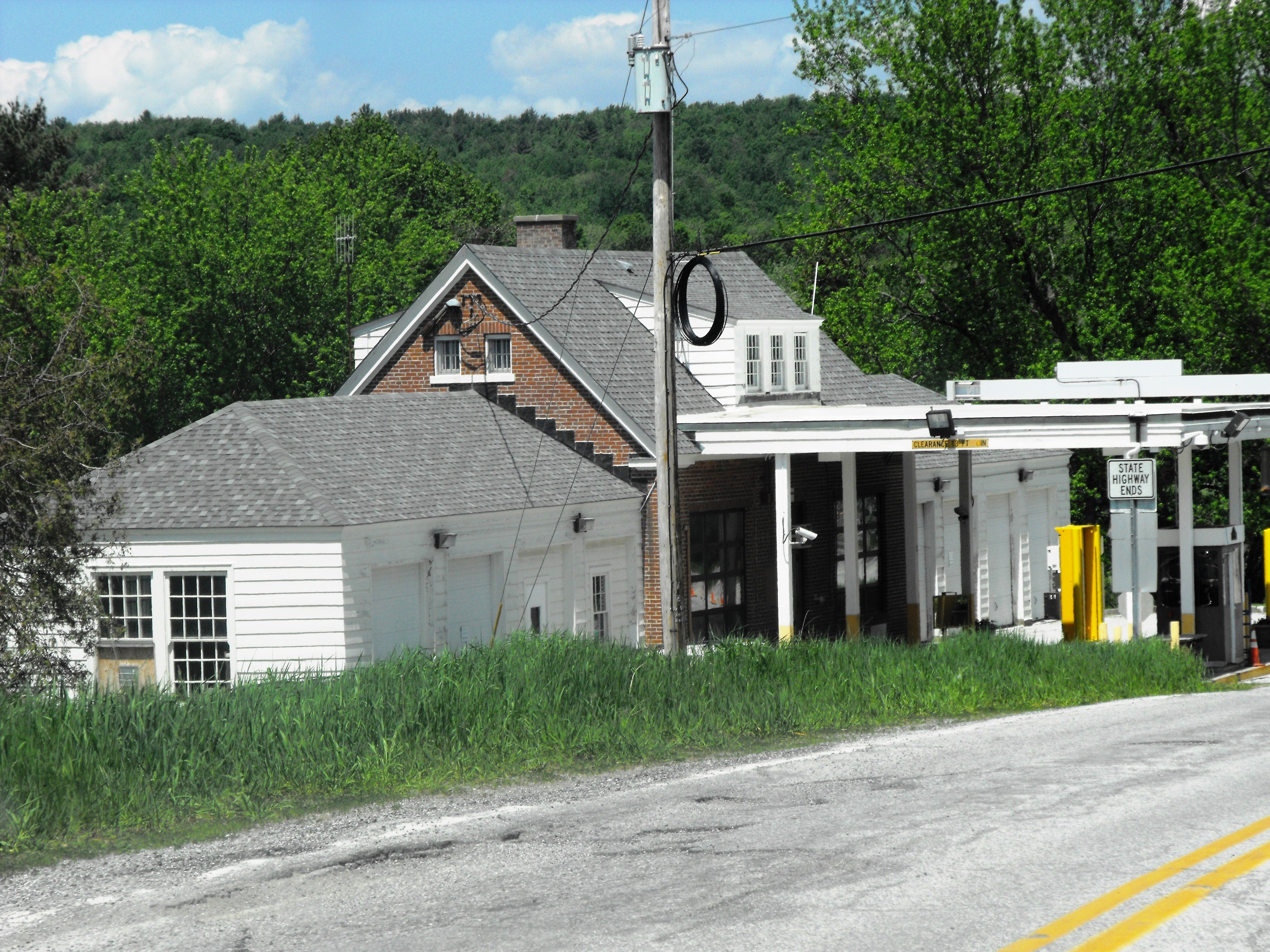
Route 237 connects with Vermont Route 108 at the Canada–US border

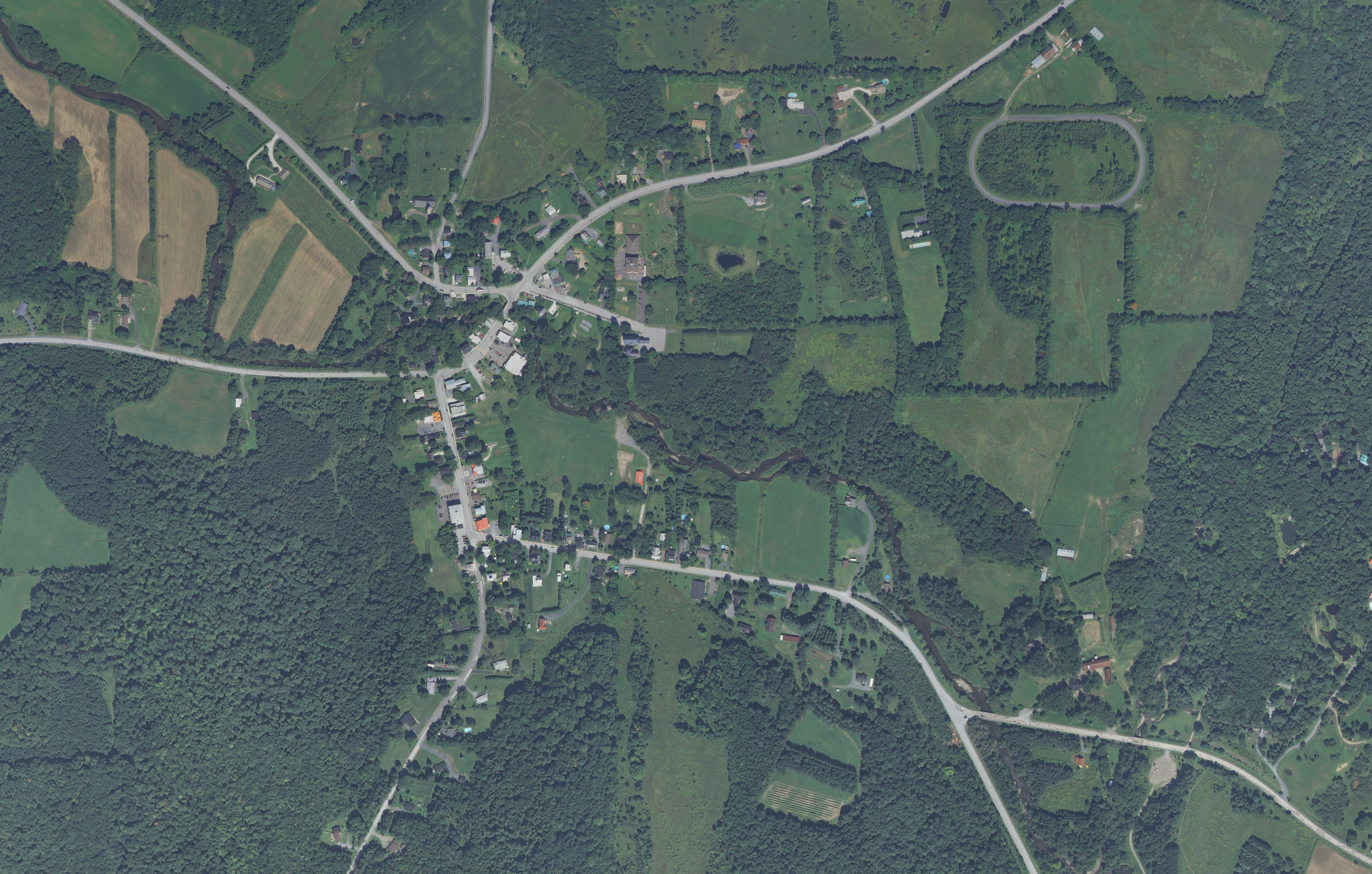
Route 237 crosses Frelighsburg village in a southeast-northwest fashion.

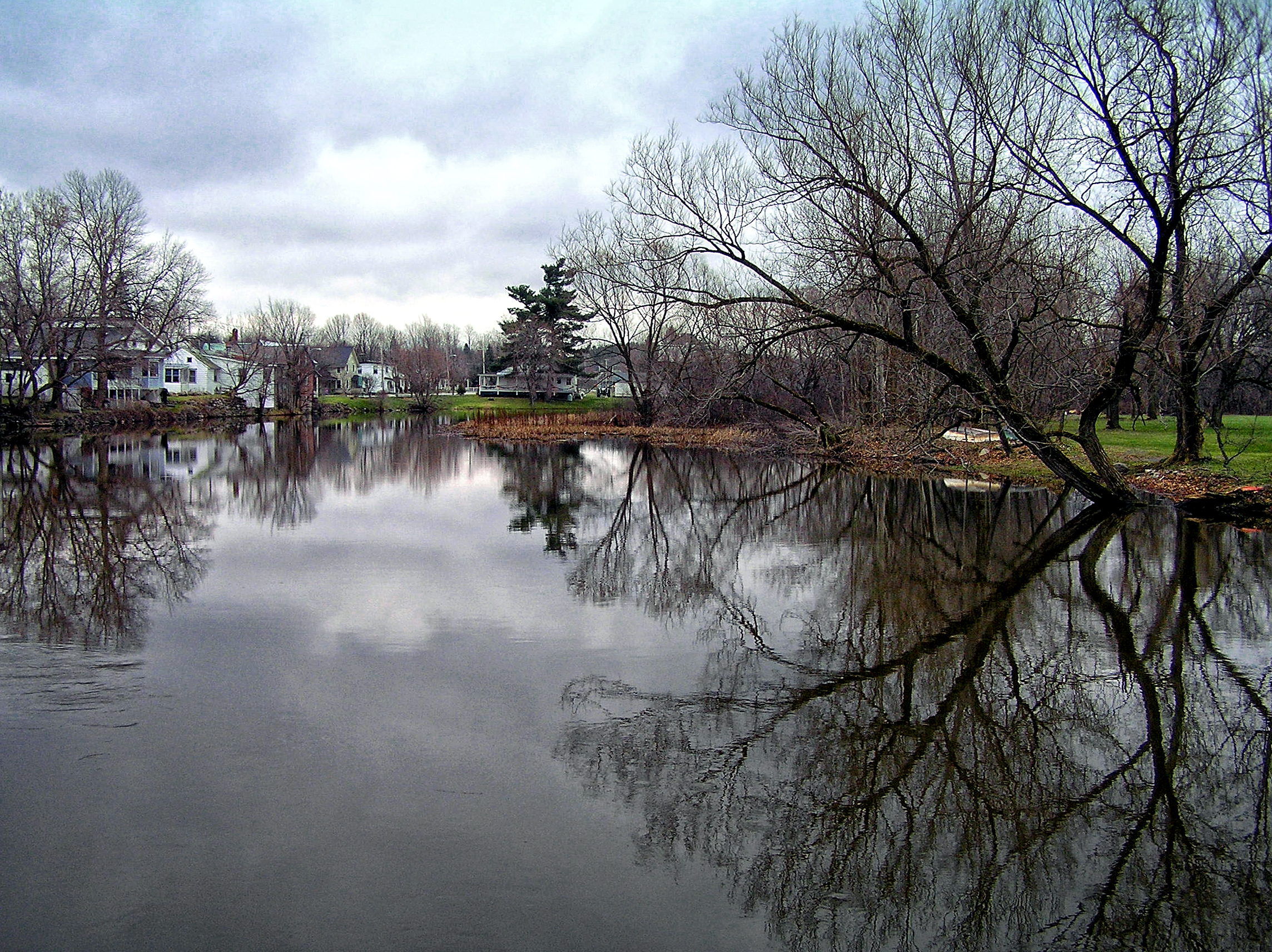
Route 237 follows the course of Pike River between the border and Stanbridge East.

== Major intersections ==
The entire route is in Brome-Missisquoi RCM.

Location	km	mi	Destinations	Notes
Frelighsburg	0	0.0	VT 108 south – Berkshire	West Berkshire–Frelighsburg Border Crossing; southern terminus
Frelighsburg			R-213 north – Dunham	Southern terminus of Route 213
Stanbridge East	14.8	9.2	R-202 – Bedford	Northern terminus
1.000 mi = 1.609 km; 1.000 km = 0.621 mi

== See also ==
- List of Quebec provincial highways
