= Rivière-aux-Brochets Ecological Reserve =

Ecological reserve in Quebec, Canada

Coordinates: 45.0719°N 73.0881°W

- IUCN category Ia (strict nature reserve)
- Interactive map of Rivière-aux-Brochets Ecological Reserve
- Location: Saint-Armand / Pike River (municipality), Brome-Missisquoi Regional County Municipality, Quebec, Canada
- Established: December 15, 1999

Rivière-aux-Brochets Ecological Reserve is an ecological reserve in Quebec, Canada. It was established on December 15, 1999. It is situated near the mouth of the Pike River (French: Rivière aux Brochets) in the Brome-Missisquoi Regional County Municipality of the Montérégie region of Quebec, Canada. It is partially located in the municipality of Pike River and partially in Saint-Armand.
