= Skirmish at Moore's Corners =

1837 skirmish during the Lower Canada Rebellion

- Part of the Lower Canada Rebellion
Date	December 6, 1837
Location	Moore's Corners, Lower Canada
Result	Loyalist victory

Belligerents
Lower Canada Loyalists	Patriotes

Commanders and leaders
Captain Oran J. Kempt	Dr. Cyrille Côté; Julien Gagnon (WIA)

Units involved
Lower Canada militia	Patriotes

Strength
300+	200

Casualties and losses
None	1 killed 3 wounded 1 taken prisoner

The Skirmish at Moore's Corners was a small skirmish fought on December 6, 1837, in Moore's Corners during the Lower Canada Rebellion between Lower Canada militia and Patriote rebels. A group of 84 Patriotes marched into Lower Canada from Swanton, Vermont intending to join other rebels and were intercepted in the hamlet of Moore's Corners by loyalist militia from the parishes of Philipsburg and Missisqoui. The Patriotes were forced to retreat and noted the end of the rebellion in the Richelieu Valley which allowed the British commander, Sir John Colborne to allocate more forces to deal with the threat in the Deux-Montagnes region. (Note: Deux-Montagnes is the French name for the Lake of Two Mountains region.)

== Background ==
Within twenty years of the establishment of Lower Canada in 1791, new tracts of land were set aside for settlement by peoples other than French Canadians. The French remained predominantly on the seigneuries located by rivers and the new areas were settled largely by English-speaking British immigrants. The new English-speaking immigrants reaped greater benefits than the existing French communities under the British government. Those French Canadians who were elected to the Legislative Assembly of Lower Canada were mainly of the elite educated at Catholic colleges as social movement was restricted by the British who monopolized commerce and government postings. The French Canadian habitants faced diminishing lands to give to their children and competed with the English for the new lands on English terms, with British bureaucracy placing immigrant claims ahead of those of the habitants. Furthermore, outbreaks in dysentery, typhus and cholera swept through the colony in the mid-1830s, brought by arriving immigrants. Additionally, farms in the Beauce, Chaudière and Richelieu regions (and to a lesser extent, the area around Montreal) were devastated by wheat fly, grasshopper and caterpillar infestations, reducing the food available.

Efforts by the French within the Legislative Assembly, led by Louis-Joseph Papineau, the elected leader of the Parti Patriote, to control government spending, were thwarted by the English-dominated Legislative Council of Lower Canada. Further discontent was stimulated when two journalist supporters of Papineau were arrested and jailed after disparaging the Legislative Council in their newspapers. The ensuing riot on 21 May 1832 was quashed when the garrison was called out, ending with three dead. With the parliamentary route blocked, Papineau and his allies argued for armed rebellion at an open-air meeting at Saint-Charles and published a declaration of independence. The supporters of Papineau formed para-military groups and visible support was seen in Montreal and villages to the east of the city. Sir John Colborne, commander of the military in the Canadian colonies, called out the militia and sent out warrants for arrest for suspected rebels on 16 November 1837. Papineau and other Patriote leaders fled Montreal to Saint-Denis in the Richelieu Valley.

== Prelude ==
=== Patriotes ===
Following the Patriote defeat at the Battle of Saint-Charles, the flight of Patriote leaders to the United States began. Doctor Cyrille Côté and Julien Gagnon fled to Swanton, Vermont. (Note: Joseph Gagnon is referred to as Lucien Gagnon by Schull.) They had been told by Papineau that the leader of the victorious Patriotes of the Battle of Saint-Denis, Wolfred Nelson, was forming a new headquarters at Saint-Césaire. At Swanton over 200 Patriotes gathered and were armed with muskets and two cannon by the Vermont Militia company of Stowe, Vermont. Organized by Côté and Robert Bouchette, the Patriote leadership sent Gagnon back across the border to recruit and he returned with 84 volunteers. The plan was to take the collected arms and ammunition consisting of 112 muskets, 6,000 cartridges, two kegs of grapeshot, three kegs of gunpowder and one 3-pounder (1.4 kg) cannon and one 4-pounder (1.8 kg) cannon to supply Nelson's reported camp at Saint-Césaire. (Note: 3-pounder refers to the weight of shot that the cannon could fire, in this case a 3-pound (1.4 kg) ball.) However, this recruiting trip alerted the border guards to the Patriote threat. On December 6, The Patriote force began moving towards the Canadian border along the Swanton Road heading to Saint-Césaire, which lays on the Yamaska River, 48 kilometres (30 mi) to the north of Swanton.

=== Lower Canada militia ===
The border guards alerted Captain Oran J. Kemp of the militia at Frelighsburg. He immediately tasked 50 of the Missisquoi Volunteers to guard their own arms shipment that had arrived from Montreal. He then sent messages to the other parishes calling to arms the local volunteers. By 16:30 on December 6, over 300 militia had gathered from Philipsburg and Missisquoi. At 20:00, Kempt received word from the border that the Patriote force was on the move. Kempt marched his volunteers to Moore's Corners, 4.0 kilometres (2 1/2 mi) east of Philipsburg where the Swanton Road meets the Saint-Armand Road.

== Battle ==
The Patriotes had been advancing along Missisquoi Bay, reaching the village and resting in the Philipsburg Methodist Church and barricaded themselves within. On the north side of the bridge, at the corner of Chemin Saint-Armand and Chemin St-Henri, in front of Hiram Moore's house. An advance guard of 12 Patriotes under the command of Robert Bourchette moved up the road under the cover of falling darkness and falling snow. At the intersection of the two roads, the Missisquoi Volunteers began firing upon the Patriotes without orders. In the following firefight which lasted for roughly 20 minutes, Bourchette, Gagnon, and two others were injured and one Patriote was killed. The militia suffered no casualties. Due to the darkness and the snowfall, confusion reigned amongst Patriotes and they soon retreated to Swanton, abandoning their arms and ammunition.

== Outcome ==
Several Patriotes were taken prisoner in the encounter, including Bourchette and Dr. Timothée Kimber. Unbeknownst to Côté and the rest of the Patriote leadership at Swanton, Nelson had never set up a camp at Saint-Césaire. Instead, he and his leadership party had made an attempt to cross the border to the United States. However, Nelson became separated from his party and was arrested by the border guards. The rest of the party was in the vicinity of Moore's Corners when the skirmish erupted. Not knowing why there was gunfire, the party attempted to retrace its steps within Quebec and they too were apprehended. The only member of Nelson's party to make it to the United States was Thomas Storrow Brown, who had separated from the party earlier.

Upon hearing of the threat posed at Moore's Corners, Colborne ordered 600 troops of the 24th Regiment and the 32nd Regiment to Saint-Armand. The successful defence at Moore's Corners saw Colborne renew recruitment of volunteers (mainly Anglophones). The recruitment program was a success, with new militia units raised in Montreal, Deux-Montagnes, Chambly, and Lachine. The Patriote defeat at the skirmish marked the end of rebel operations within the Richelieu Valley for the year. Colborne changed direction and began planning a march on the Patriote forces in the Deux-Montagnes region.

== Sources ==
- Fryer, Mary Beacock (1986). Battlefields of Canada. Toronto: Dundurn Press. ISBN 1-55002-007-2.
- Gott, Richard (2011). Britain's Empire: Resistance, Repression and Revolt. London: Verso. ISBN 978-1-84467-892-1.
- "The Moore's Corner Battle in 1837". First Report of the Transactions of the Missisquoi County Historical Society. St. John's, Quebec: Missisquoi County Historical Society: 67–73. 1906. OCLC 18233814.
- Schull, Joseph (1971). Rebellion: The Rising in French Canada 1837. Toronto: MacMillan of Canada. ISBN 0-77157-402-9.
- Senior, Elinor Kyte (1985). Redcoats and Patriotes: The Rebellion in Lower Canada 1837–38. Stittsville, Ontario: National Museums of Canada and Canada's Wings. ISBN 0-920002-28-5.
