= Mount Pinnacle =

Mountain in Quebec, Canada

The Pinnacle
- Le Pinacle
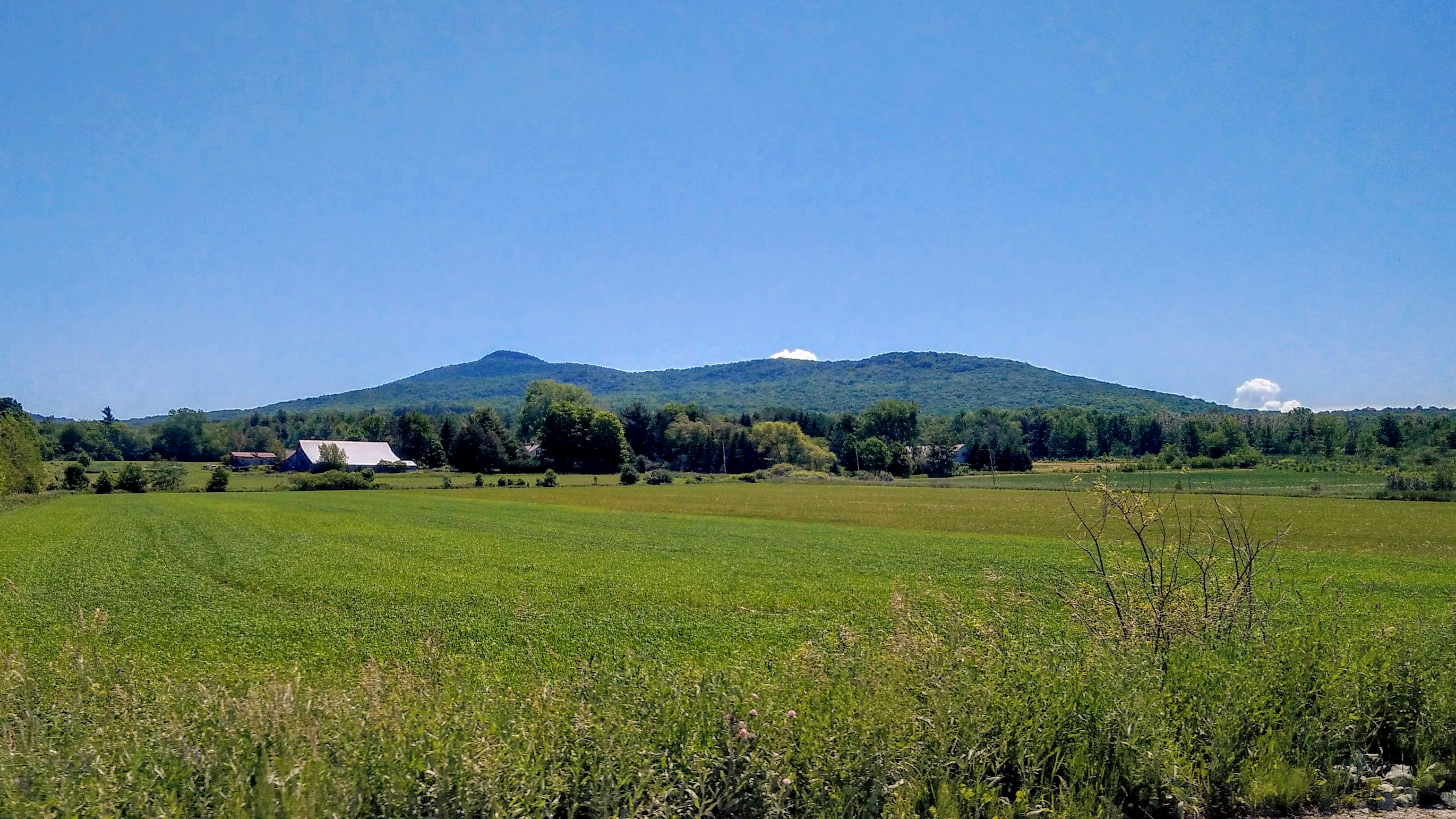
- The Pinnacle as seen from Abbott's Corner road.

Highest point
- Elevation: 712 m (2,336 ft)
- Coordinates: 45°02′48″N 72°44′22″W

Geography
- Location within Quebec
- Country: Canada
- Province: Quebec
- Municipality: Frelighsburg
- Parent range: Sutton Mountain Range (Appalachian Mountains)

The Pinnacle (French: Le Pinacle) is a mountain in Frelighsburg, Quebec, Canada. The mountain has an elevation of 712 metres (2,336 ft) and covers an area of 22 square kilometres (8.5 mi^{2}).

The Pinnacle was originally inhabited by the Abenaki tribe and is considered one of the few remaining unspoiled mountains in southwestern Quebec.
