= The Choice (Homeland) =

- Homeland episode
- Episode no.: Season 2 Episode 12
- Directed by: Michael Cuesta
- Written by: Alex Gansa; Meredith Stiehm
- Production code: 2WAH12
- Original air date: December 16, 2012
- Running time: 65 minutes

Guest appearances
- Talia Balsam as Cynthia Walden; Timothée Chalamet as Finn Walden; Sarita Choudhury as Mira; Billy Smith as Special Agent Hall; John Cariani as Jeff Ricker; Alon Abutbul; Edelen McWilliams as Sloane Nelson; Rupert Friend as Peter Quinn

Episode chronology
← Previous "In Memoriam"	Next → "Tin Man Is Down"
- Homeland season 2

"The Choice" is the twelfth and final episode of the second season of the American television drama series Homeland, and the 24th episode overall. It originally aired on Showtime on December 16, 2012.

== Plot ==
Carrie (Claire Danes) and Brody (Damian Lewis) spend another night at the cabin where they had their previous tryst. They discuss their futures, and whether it is possible for Brody to have a fresh start. They mutually realize that if they were to continue their relationship, then it would be impossible for Carrie to remain with the CIA. Meanwhile, Saul is still detained at Langley, and pleads with a CIA officer (T. J. Hassan) to contact Carrie. The officer is reluctant as he does not want to suffer the same fate as Saul.

Quinn (Rupert Friend), under orders to kill Brody, has tracked Carrie and Brody and is across the lake watching their every move. The next morning, Brody alone goes outside to pray, giving Quinn, carrying a sniper rifle, an opportunity to kill him. Quinn has Brody in his sights but does not pull the trigger.

Quinn later goes to Estes' (David Harewood) house and tells him that since Brody's political career is over, he is no longer a threat, and that his information was instrumental in catching Abu Nazir. Quinn says that the only reason to kill Brody now is for Estes' personal reasons, and that the collateral damage would be wrecking Carrie's life yet again, and so he refuses to do it and threatens Estes should anything happen to Brody. Estes releases Saul (Mandy Patinkin) from detention, claiming that he decided Saul was right, and that Brody held up his end of the deal and should not be killed.

Brody goes back home to pick up a suit for the memorial service that the CIA is holding for Vice President Walden. He finds Dana (Morgan Saylor) to be the only one home. Dana reflects on the day that Carrie told her that Brody was going to carry out an attack at the Vice President's summit, remarking that it all "adds up", and that it is the only thing that makes sense. Brody admits that he was "screwed up" at the time, and that he was planning to do it, but ultimately he did not, and he never would do such a thing in the future.

Saul finds Carrie and tells her that he is going to recommend her promotion to station chief. When Carrie is less than thrilled, and says she has to think about it, Saul sees that her problem is that she wants to be with Brody. The conversation gets heated as Saul admonishes Carrie for throwing away her career to be with a terrorist. Carrie retorts that she does not want to be alone all her life like Saul. Saul leaves her with the words "You're the smartest and the dumbest fucking person I've ever known".

Carrie and Brody attend Walden's memorial service at Langley. At the same time, the Navy holds a ceremony to bury Abu Nazir at sea, which Saul oversees. While David Estes delivers Walden's eulogy, Carrie and Brody sneak away to Saul's office to talk. Carrie reveals to Brody that she has decided to forsake her career and be with him. They kiss. Brody looks out of the window and is surprised to see that his car has been moved and is now parked right outside the building where the memorial service is being held. As Carrie processes what is happening, the car explodes, leveling a large portion of the building. David Estes, Cynthia Walden (Talia Balsam), Finn Walden (Timothée Chalamet), the Secretary of Defense and the Secretary of Homeland Security are among the many who perish in the blast. Carrie holds Brody at gunpoint, accusing him of orchestrating the attack. Brody is steadfast in his innocence, saying that he had no motive, and that they were all set up by Abu Nazir, who sacrificed Roya and her team on a decoy attack, and even sacrificed his own life, in order to let everyone's guard down, clearing the way for the bombing of Langley. Carrie seems convinced but tells Brody that nobody else will believe him, and that they need to go on the run immediately.

Saul surveys the damage at Langley and is distraught to learn that the death toll is near 200 and rising, and that Carrie was present at the ceremony but is unaccounted for and presumed dead. He gets a call from Mira (Sarita Choudhury), who is relieved to learn that Saul survived, and says that she is returning to the U.S. Saul is also informed he will be meeting with the President as he is the new acting director.

Carrie takes Brody to a storage unit where she has hidden some cash and a fake passport for herself. They then go to get a fake passport made for Brody. On a television, they see that al-Qaeda has taken responsibility for the attack, and released Brody's confession video (which he made for the planned suicide attack against the Vice President in season 1) to the media, firmly placing him as the culprit. As the video plays on the news, the Brody family is shown at home watching in horror. Carrie and Brody head to the Canada–United States border, planning to cross it on foot and head for Montreal. When they reach the border, Brody realizes that Carrie is not coming with him. She instructs him to walk through the woods the rest of the way to the border to meet with her friend June, who has a cabin at Lake Selby on the Canadian-side of the border. As they say goodbye, Carrie promises Brody that she will clear his name. Carrie returns to Langley, where Saul is reciting the Kaddish while standing among the rows and rows of dead bodies. Saul is shocked and elated to see that Carrie is alive.

== Production ==
The episode was written by executive producers Alex Gansa and Meredith Stiehm, and was directed by executive producer Michael Cuesta.

== Reception ==
=== Ratings ===
The original American broadcast received 2.29 million viewers, which decreased in viewership from the previous episode.

=== Critical response ===
Out of 21 reviews of the episode indexed by Metacritic, 13 were positive, six were mixed, and two were negative. Among critics rating the episode favorably, Alessandra Stanley of The New York Times stated that the finale surpassed expectations and that it "brought closure and still managed to stay open-ended". Andy Greenwald of Grantland.com called it a "deeply satisfying, deeply moving season finale", praising Mandy Patinkin's performance as "a thing of beauty". Margaret Eby of The Los Angeles Times said that "this episode managed to balance finely tuned character moments with explosive plot twists. By the end, it seemed that 'Homeland' had definitely gotten its groove back". A mixed response was given by TIME's James Poniewozik, who felt it was a well-plotted finale, and that many of the scenes were emotionally effective, but that the scenes depicting the Carrie/Brody relationship fell short. However, The Hollywood Reporter's Tim Goodman criticized the episode as being indicative of Homeland having strayed too far from being a grounded spy thriller.

=== Awards and nominations ===
Mandy Patinkin submitted this episode for consideration at the 65th Primetime Emmy Awards for his nomination in the category of Outstanding Supporting Actor in a Drama Series.
