= Quebec Route 213 =

Highway in Quebec, Canada

Route 213

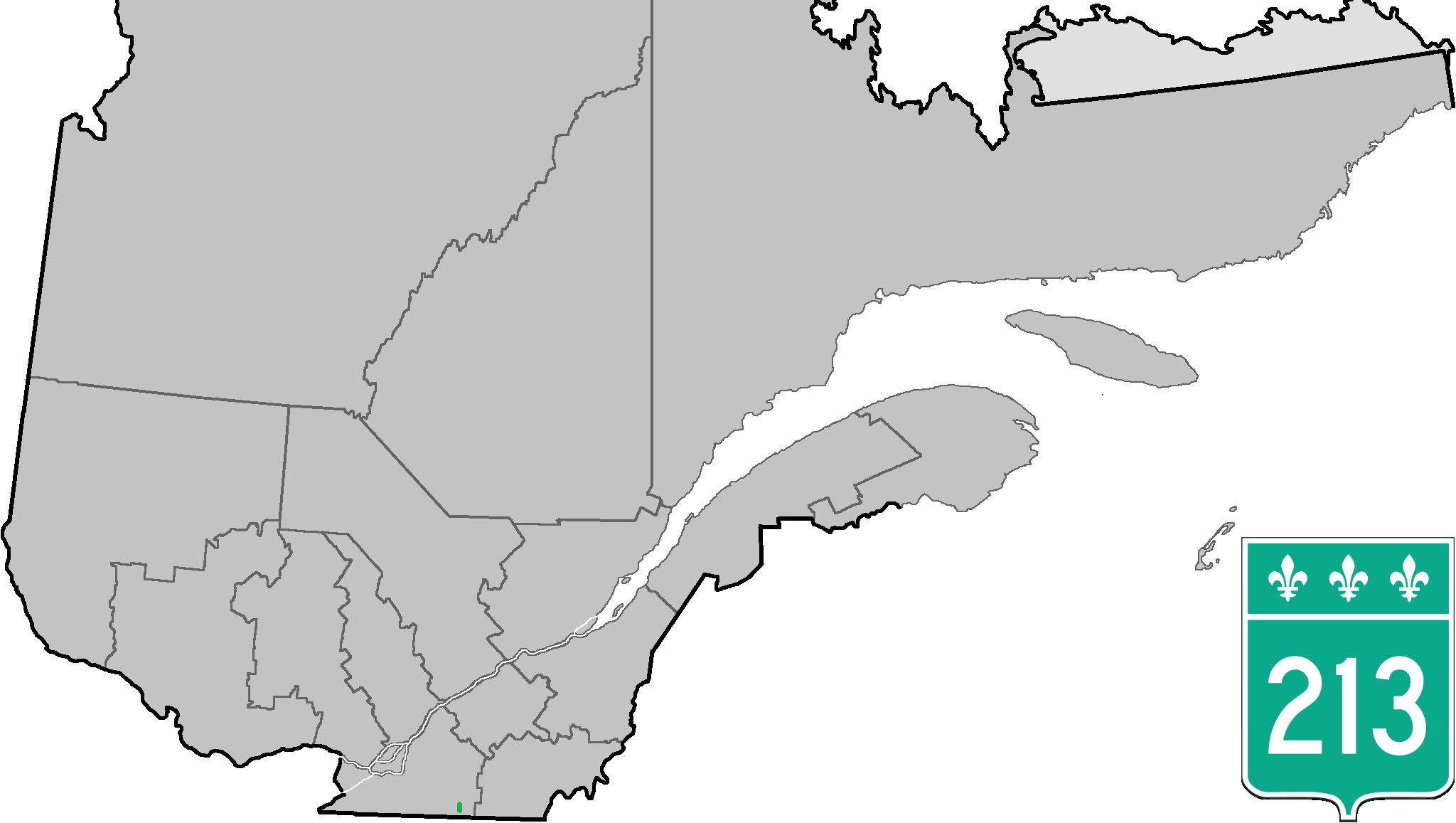

Route information
- Maintained by Transports Québec
- Length: 9.4 km (5.8 mi)

Major junctions
- South end: R-237 in Frelighsburg
- North end: R-202 in Dunham

Location
- Country: Canada
- Province: Quebec

Highway system
- Quebec provincial highways; Autoroutes; List; Former
← R-212	→ R-214

Route 213 is a short two-lane north/south highway in the province of Quebec, Canada, which starts in Frelighsburg at the junction of Route 237 and ends in Dunham at the junction of Route 202. It is the shortest road in Quebec that is provincially signed.

== Municipalities along Route 213 ==
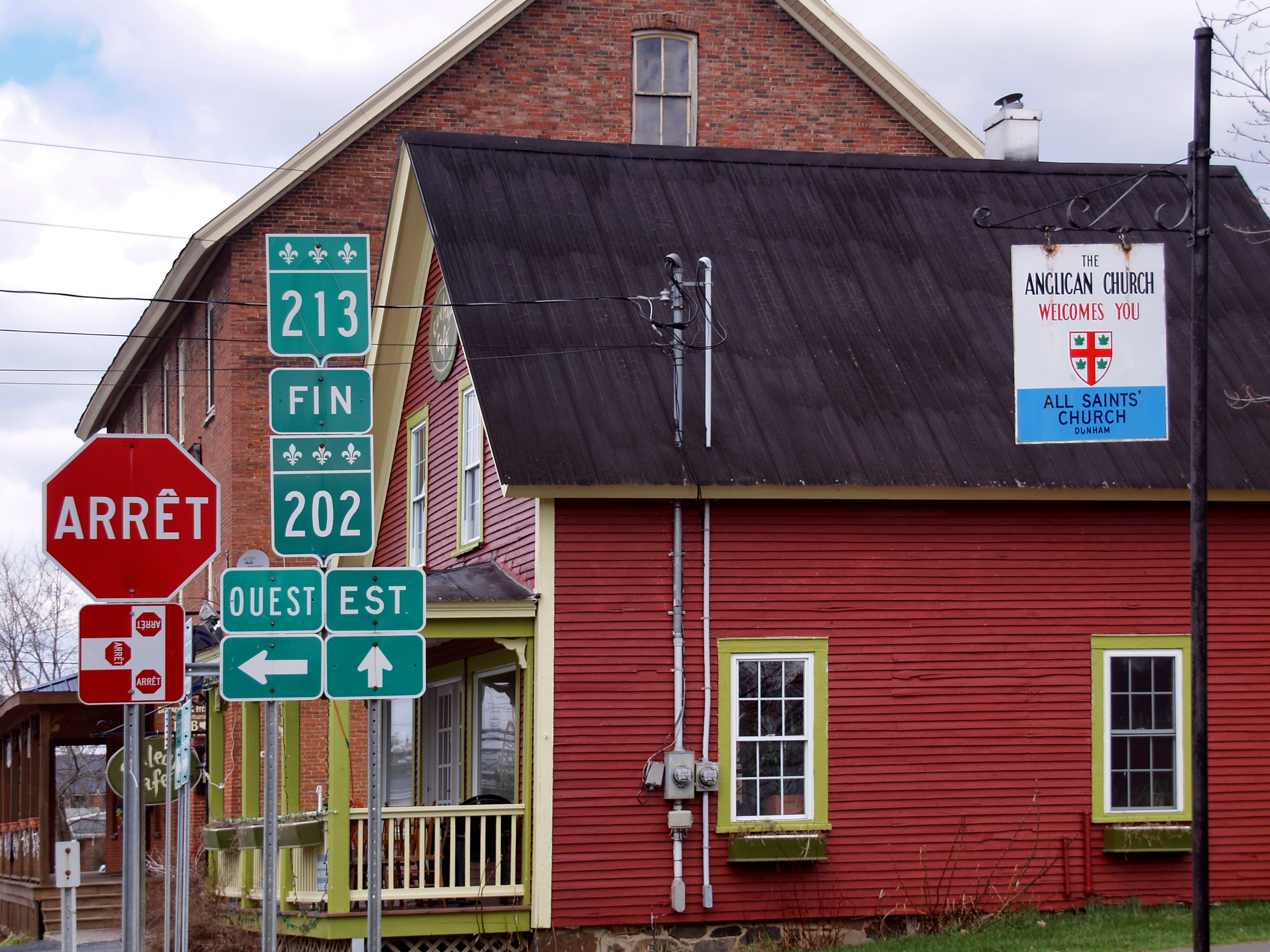
Intersection of Quebec Routes 202 and 213 in downtown Dunham

- Frelighsburg
- Dunham

== Major intersections ==
The entire route is in Brome-Missisquoi RCM.

Location	km	mi	Destinations	Notes
Frelighsburg	0	0.0	R-237 – Franklin, Vermont, Stanbridge East, Quebec	Southern terminus
Dunham	9.4	5.8	R-202 – Stanbridge East, Cowansville	Northern terminus
1.000 mi = 1.609 km; 1.000 km = 0.621 mi

== See also ==
- List of Quebec provincial highways
