= Black Coalition of Quebec =

Canadian anti-racism organization in Quebec

- Ligue des Noirs du Québec
- Headquarters: Montreal, Québec, Canada
- Region served: Québec, Canada

The Black Coalition of Quebec (French title: La Ligue des Noirs du Quebec) is an organization for the moral and legal defence of Black people living in the Canadian province of Quebec and was founded in 1969

The coalition intervenes to defend the rights of Black communities, against racial profiling and discrimination, particularly in the areas of justice and employment. It raises awareness among governments about the plight of the Black community and acts as a tool for public education within local communities. It also represents complainants before the Human Rights Commission if an individual believes they have been arrested on unjust grounds related to the colour of their skin.

In 2005, the Coalition filed a complaint against Pierre Mailloux along with the Saint-Jean-Baptiste Society of Montreal for defamation against Black people. Mailloux had stated on television that, according to an American study, statistically Black people had an average IQ slightly below 100.
