= Pike River (Missisquoi Bay tributary) =

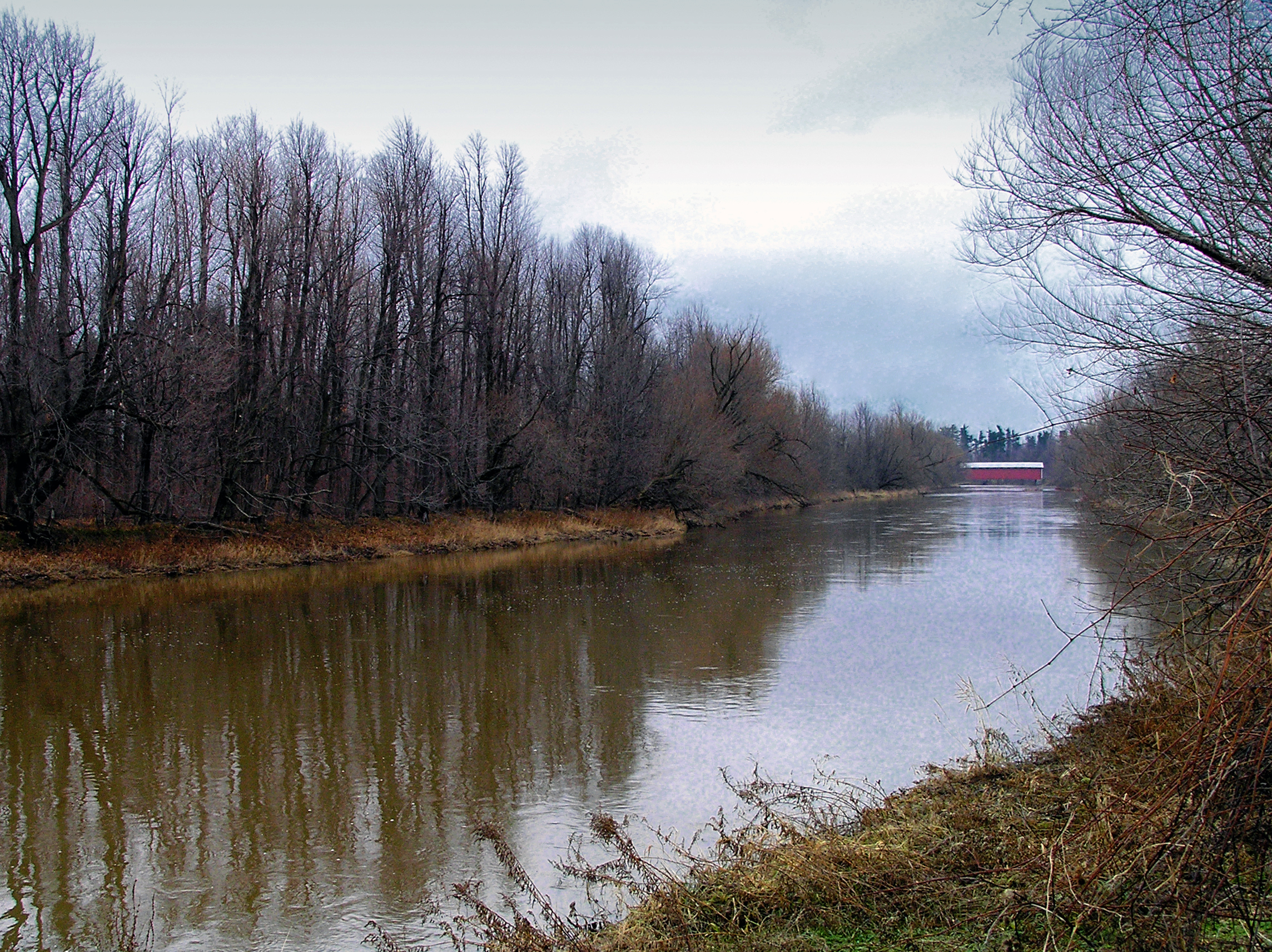
- Pike River in Notre-Dame-de-Stanbridge
- Native name: Rivière aux Brochets (French)

Location
- Country: Canada
- Province: Quebec
- Region: Estrie
- Regional County Municipality: Franklin County, Vermont, Brome-Missisquoi
- Municipalities: Frelighsburg, Stanbridge East, Bedford, Notre-Dame-de-Stanbridge, Pike River (the eponymous municipality) and Saint-Armand.

Physical characteristics
- Source: South side of Mount Pinacle
  - location: Frelighsburg
  - coordinates: 45°01′26″N 072°44′00″W
- Mouth: Missisquoi Bay of Lake Champlain
  - location: Saint-Armand
  - coordinates: 45.07083°N 73.09722°W
  - elevation: 31 m (102 ft)
- Length: 67 km (42 mi)
- Basin size: 630 km^{2} (240 sq mi)

Basin features
- Progression: Missisquoi Bay - Lake Champlain - Richelieu River - St. Lawrence River
- Tributaries
  - left: (Upstream) Louis-Rocheleau brook, Rocheleau brook, Galipeau brook, Charles-Côté stream, Meigs brook, Dutch Street brook, Martindale-Montagne brook, Grothers brook.
  - right: (Upstream) Bellefroid-Dandurand brook, Ewing brook, the little brook, Pelletier brook, Morpions brook, Charorn brook, Walbridge brook, McNamara stream, Coslett brook, Campbell-Dufresne brook, Merida-Verville stream, North Pike River, Dextraze brook, watercourse Baker-Cage Water, Furnace Creek, Callaghan Creek, Boffin Creek, Leavitt Creek, Selby Creek, Abbott's Corner Creek.

Pike River (French: Rivière aux Brochets) is a tributary of Lake Champlain (via Missisquoi Bay), flowing successively in:

- Franklin County, Vermont, in northern Vermont (United States); and
- the municipalities of Frelighsburg, Stanbridge East, Bedford, Notre-Dame-de-Stanbridge, Pike River (the eponymous municipality) and Saint-Armand, in Brome-Missisquoi, in the administrative region of Estrie, in the south of province of Quebec, Canada.

Besides the village areas, agriculture and forestry are the main economic activities in this valley.

The river surface is generally frozen from mid-December to the end of March. Safe traffic on the ice is generally from late December to early March. The water level of the river varies with the seasons and the precipitation.

== Geography ==
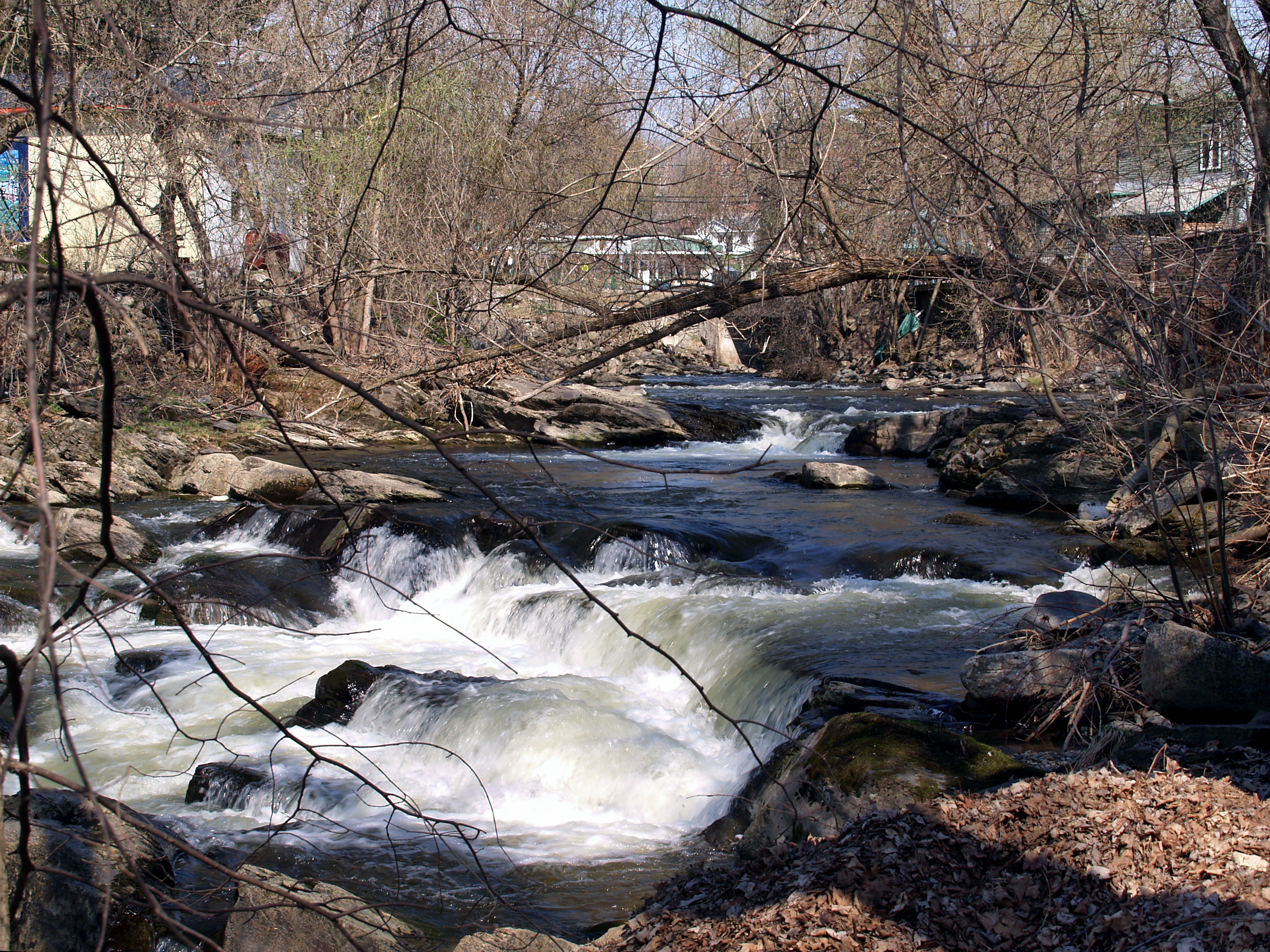
The Brochet River upstream of the Freligh mill in Frelighsburg.

The stream's source is in Quebec on the south side of Mount Pinacle. After flowing into Vermont it receives the outflow of Lake Carmi and flows back into Quebec for the remainder of its course.

The main town of the watershed is Bedford but the municipalities of Saint-Armand, Notre-Dame-de-Stanbridge, Saint-Ignace-de-Stanbridge, Pike River (the eponymous municipality) and Frelighsburg.

Its course, about sixty kilometers long, oriented to the north, is mainly located in Quebec. More than 85% of its watershed, i.e. 670 square kilometres (260 sq mi), is thus located on the territory of the Brome-Missisquoi Regional County Municipality in the south of the Estrie.

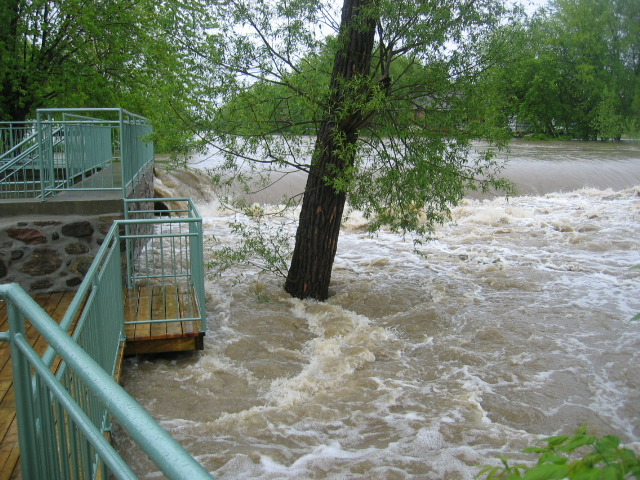
The old mill of Notre-Dame-de-Stanbridge on the Brochets river during the floods of summer 2006.

From Carmi Lake, the river flows 3.2 km (2.0 mi) north to the Canada-United States border.

From the border, the river flows 5.1 km (3.2 mi) north to Selby Creek (coming from the northeast); then 1.4 km north-west to the village bridge at Frelighsburg.

North of the border, the river crosses a series of falls and rapids) interspersed with long, slow-flowing sections, crossing Frelighsburg, Stanbridge East and Bedford before leaving the Appalachians to reach the plain of St. Lawrence Lowlands. A series of close falls are contained by five dams. Further downstream, the course of the river becomes winding, making a long detour via Notre-Dame-de-Stanbridge, then crossing the last rapids at Pike River to finish its course through swampy forests. The Pike River is a tributary of the northeast shore of Missisquoi Bay in Quebec.

The main watershed municipality is Bedford but the municipalities of Saint-Armand, Notre-Dame-de-Stanbridge, Saint-Ignace-de-Stanbridge, Pike River and Frelighsburg are also included.

== Toponymy ==
Formerly, this river was designated by its English version "Pike River".

The toponym "Rivière aux Brochets" was formalized on December 5, 1968, at the Commission de toponymie du Québec.

== Ecology ==
The mouth of Rivière-aux-Brochets is a biological reserve. Until the late 2000s, however, the water in the bay was stagnant and the bay was dying, contaminating large American portions of the lake confined by the numerous embankments of disused railways (Carry Bay, The Gut, Sandbar State Park, Allen Point.) When the new bridge opened on the American side between East Alburg and Lakewood, the old road on the dyke was partially demolished, which made it possible, during the spring breakup and during heavy rains, a certain flow of water to "Grand Lac Champlain" (25 nautical miles (46 km; 29 mi) - from there).

In September 2014, the UPA's media body "La Terre de chez nous" reported that blue-green algae was contaminating the Bedford water treatment plant. With global warming, this problem tends to become recurrent. It is likely to worsen as long as the flow remains slowed down by the railway rights-of-way or until it is evacuated artificially, for example by connecting the outlet of the McPhee stream (at the limit of Clarenceville and Venise-en-Quebec) with the South River further north, some 12 km (7.5 mi) away. This excavation could give rise to a small navigation channel to allow boaters to get to the Richelieu River without passing through the United States.

== See also ==
- Brome-Missisquoi Regional County Municipality
- Rivière-aux-Brochets Ecological Reserve
- North Brochets River (Missisquoi Bay)
- List of rivers of Quebec
- Pont de Des Rivières
