= Slab city =

Term for an area that formerly surrounded a sawmill in the US

Slab city is a derogatory term for an area which surrounded a sawmill in American frontier times. De-limbed timber was placed in the mill. The timber was cut from its somewhat rounded shape to a four-sided piece of lumber, which would be further sawed into lumber of useful sizes. The original pieces that were cut, along with the bark, were called "slabs" and discarded nearby until a use was found for them. Eventually, the slab piles became the most visible part of the area. Other specialists would construct businesses in the area, such as a blacksmith, a general store, a post office, and a wheelwright. Sometimes a village or town would form around the place and the sobriquet "slab city" was replaced by a place name.

Vermont had nine such slab cities. Massachusetts had at least one.
