= Dunham, Quebec =

Dunham
- City
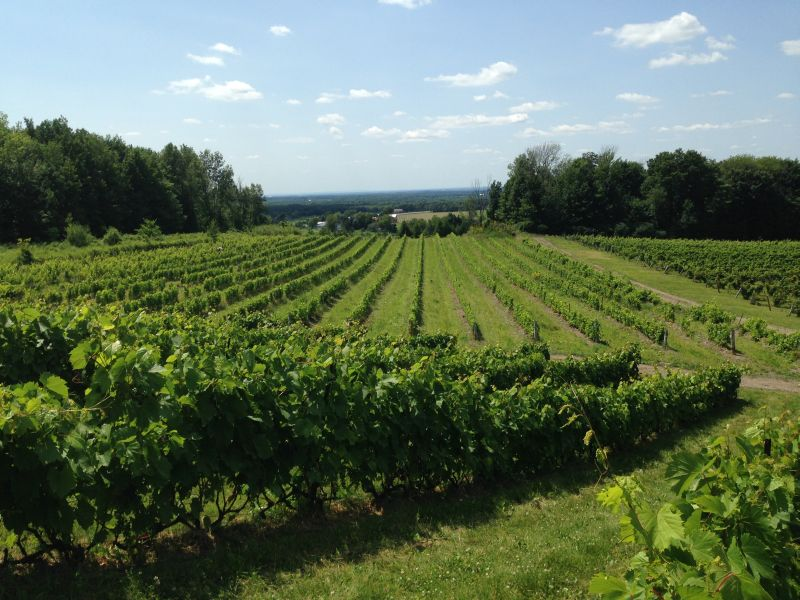
- A vineyard in Dunham.

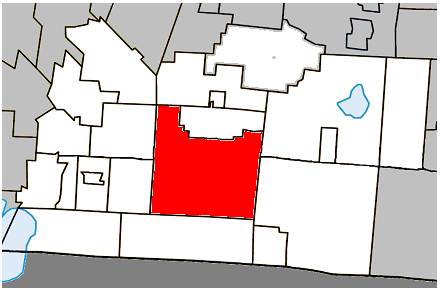
- Location within Brome-Missisquoi RCM.

- Location in southern Quebec.
- Coordinates: 45°08′N 72°48′W
- Country: Canada
- Province: Quebec
- Region: Estrie
- RCM: Brome-Missisquoi
- Constituted: September 25, 1971

Government
  - Mayor: Pierre Janecek
  - Federal riding: Brome—Missisquoi
  - Prov. riding: Brome-Missisquoi

Area
  - Total: 196.20 km^{2} (75.75 sq mi)
  - Land: 195.18 km^{2} (75.36 sq mi)

Population (2011)
  - Total: 3,471
  - Density: 17.8/km^{2} (46/sq mi)
  - Pop 2006-2011: ▲2.2%
  - Dwellings: 1,709
- Time zone: UTC−5 (EST)
  - Summer (DST): UTC−4 (EDT)
- Postal code(s): J0E 1M0
- Area codes: 450 and 579
- Highways: R-202; R-213
- Website: www.ville.dunham.qc.ca

Dunham is a city in the Canadian province of Quebec, located in Brome-Missisquoi Regional County Municipality. The population as of the Canada 2011 Census was 3,471.

Dunham is located approximately 12 kilometres (7.5 mi) north of the United States border. It is bordered by Saint-Ignace-de-Stanbridge and Stanbridge East to the west, Farnham to the northwest, Brigham and Cowansville to the north, Brome Lake to the northeast, Sutton to the east and Frelighsburg to the south. Selby Lake is located entirely within Dunham.

== Demographics ==
Historical Census Data - Dunham, Quebec
Year	Pop.	±%
1991	3,226	—
1996	3,370	+4.5%
2001	3,215	−4.6%
2006	3,396	+5.6%
2011	3,471	+2.2%

In the 2021 Census of Population conducted by Statistics Canada, Dunham had a population of 3,599 living in 1,529 of its 1,758 total private dwellings, a change of 4.9% from its 2016 population of 3,432. With a land area of 193.86 km^{2} (74.85 sq mi), it had a population density of 18.6/km^{2} (48.1/sq mi) in 2021.

Canada census – Dunham community profile

	2021	2011
Population	3,599 (+4.9% from 2016)	3,471 (+2.2% from 2006)
Land area	193.86 km^{2} (74.85 sq mi)	195.18 km^{2} (75.36 sq mi)
Population density	18.6/km^{2} (48/sq mi)	17.8/km^{2} (46/sq mi)
Median age	48.4 (M: 50.0, F: 47.2)	46.4 (M: 46.7, F: 46.1)
Private dwellings	1,758 (total) 1,529 (occupied)	1,709 (total)
Median household income	$76,000	$67,068

References: 2021 2011

Canada Census Mother Tongue - Dunham, Quebec
Census	Total	French			English			French & English			Other		
Year	Responses	Count	Trend	Pop %	Count	Trend	Pop %	Count	Trend	Pop %	Count	Trend	Pop %
2011	3,455	2,625	▲4.8%	75.98%	695	▼6.7%	20.12%	55	▼31.3%	1.59%	80	▲128.6%	2.31%
2006	3,365	2,505	▲6.6%	74.44%	745	▲3.5%	22.14%	80	▲45.5%	2.38%	35	▼41.7%	1.04%
2001	3,185	2,350	▼8.2%	73.78%	720	▲7.5%	22.61%	55	▲57.1%	1.73%	60	▲20.0%	1.88%
1996	3,315	2,560	n/a	77.22%	670	n/a	20.21%	35	n/a	1.06%	50	n/a	1.51%

== See also ==
- List of anglophone communities in Quebec
- List of cities in Quebec
