= Frelighsburg =

- Municipality
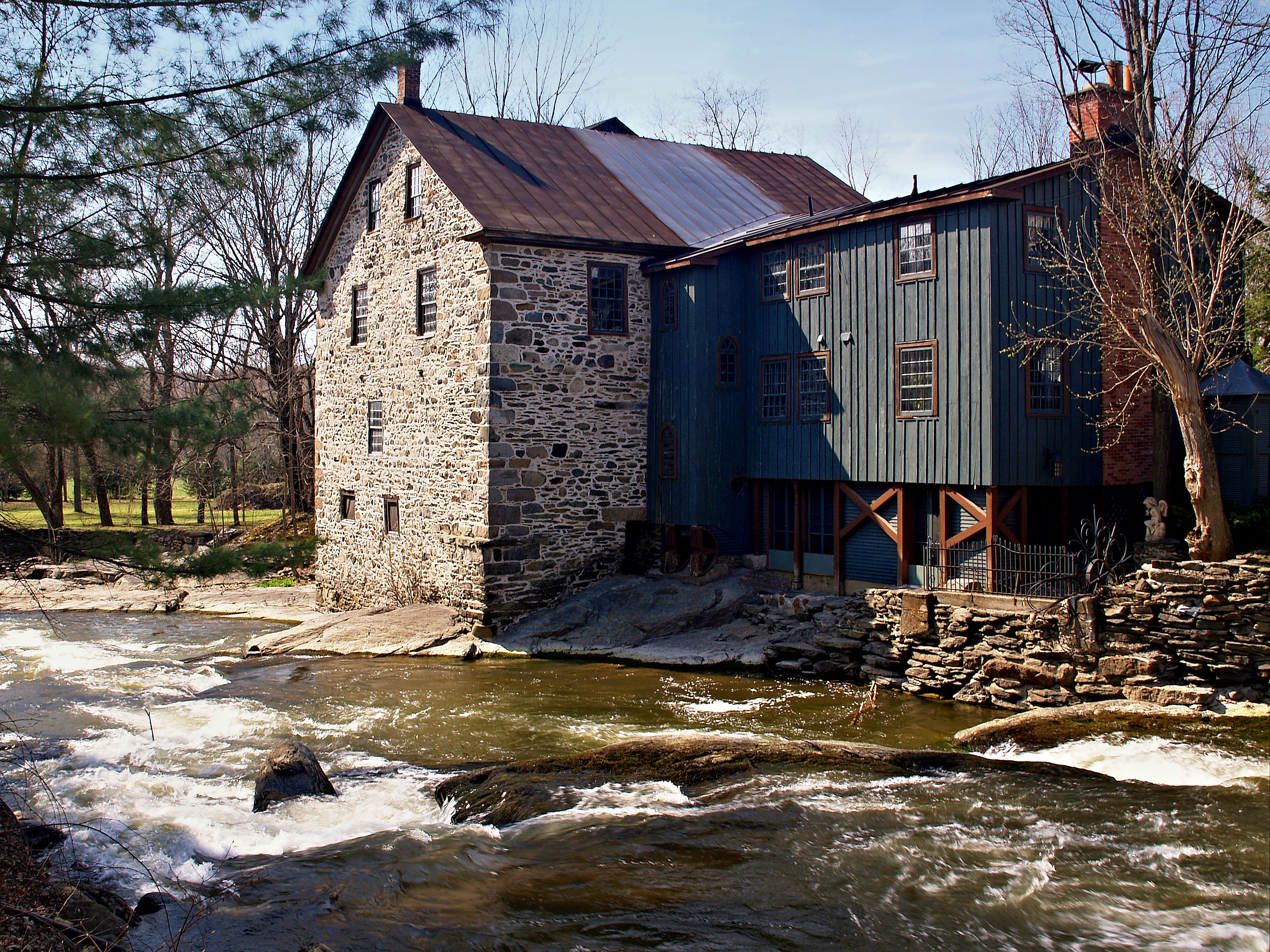
- The Freligh Mill on Pike River

- Coat of arms

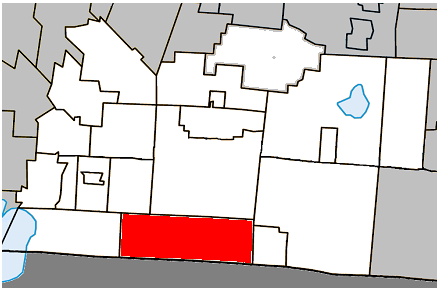
- Location within Brome-Missisquoi RCM.

- Location in southern Quebec.
- Coordinates: 45°03′N 72°50′W
- Country: Canada
- Province: Quebec
- Region: Estrie
- RCM: Brome-Missisquoi
- Constituted: September 28, 1985

Government
  - Mayor: Lucie Dagenais
  - Federal riding: Brome—Missisquoi
  - Prov. riding: Brome-Missisquoi

Area
  - Total: 124.60 km^{2} (48.11 sq mi)
  - Land: 123.31 km^{2} (47.61 sq mi)

Population (2021)
  - Total: 1,123
  - Density: 9.1/km^{2} (24/sq mi)
  - Pop 2016-2021: ▲1.1%
  - Dwellings: 622
- Time zone: UTC−5 (EST)
  - Summer (DST): UTC−4 (EDT)
- Postal code(s): J0J 1C0
- Area codes: 450 and 579
- Highways: R-213; R-237
- Website: https://frelighsburg.ca/

Frelighsburg is a municipality in the Estrie region of southern Quebec, Canada, on the border with Vermont. It is at the foot of Mount Pinnacle, part of the Appalachian Mountains.

Administratively, it is within the Brome-Missisquoi Regional County Municipality, in Estrie. Its population, as of the Canada 2021 Census, was 1,123.

== History ==
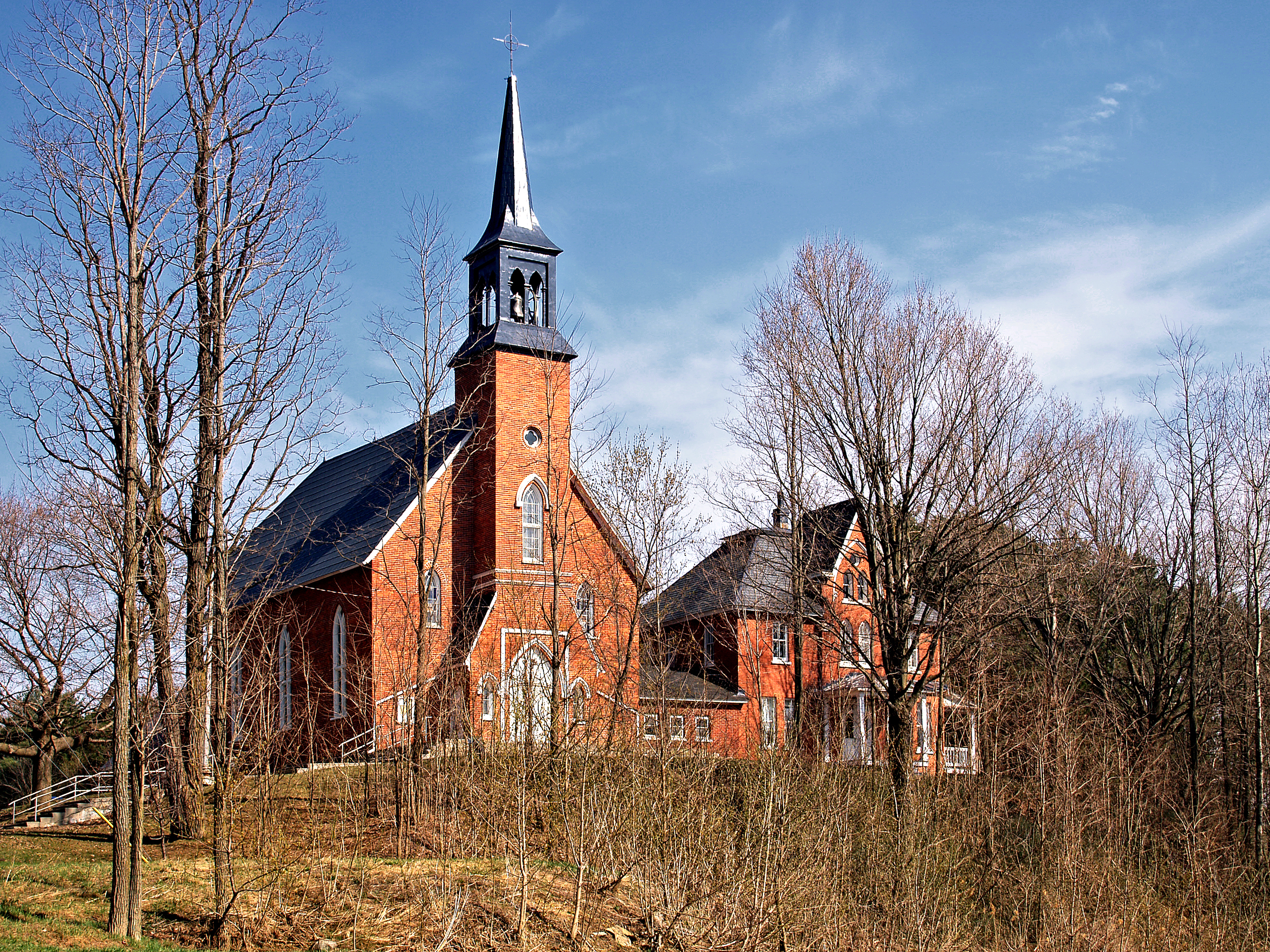
Saint-François d'Assise Church

The land that is now Frelighsburg was originally inhabited by the Abenaki people. It was established as a colony in the late 1790s by American Loyalists, including pioneer Abram Freligh, a physician of German origin who lived in Clinton, New York. The sawmill built by his son in 1839, and several other buildings from the 19th century are considered historical monuments. Prior to being named Frelighsburgh, it was named Conroy's Mills, named after another mill owner, and Slab City because of the large quantities of sawdust and slabs (slang for bark) in the area.

== Geography ==
Frelighsburg is located less than 4 kilometres (2.5 mi) from the Canada–US border with Vermont, nestled in a valley of orchards, crossed by the Pike River and at the foot of Mount Pinnacle.

=== Climate ===
Climate data for Frelighsburg, Quebec (1991–2020 normals, extremes 1993–2020)
Month	Jan	Feb	Mar	Apr	May	Jun	Jul	Aug	Sep	Oct	Nov	Dec	Year
Record high humidex	21.6	19.9	28.3	32.6	38.6	44.2	45.6	46.0	41.4	32.0	26.0	21.6	46.0
Record high °C (°F)	18.4 (65.1)	18.2 (64.8)	25.7 (78.3)	30.5 (86.9)	33.4 (92.1)	34.1 (93.4)	34.0 (93.2)	34.4 (93.9)	33.0 (91.4)	26.3 (79.3)	22.3 (72.1)	18.5 (65.3)	34.4 (93.9)
Mean daily maximum °C (°F)	−3.4 (25.9)	−1.9 (28.6)	3.0 (37.4)	11.0 (51.8)	18.7 (65.7)	23.0 (73.4)	25.6 (78.1)	24.6 (76.3)	20.5 (68.9)	13.2 (55.8)	6.5 (43.7)	−0.2 (31.6)	11.7 (53.1)
Daily mean °C (°F)	−8.1 (17.4)	−6.8 (19.8)	−1.8 (28.8)	5.8 (42.4)	13.1 (55.6)	17.7 (63.9)	20.3 (68.5)	19.4 (66.9)	15.3 (59.5)	8.7 (47.7)	2.5 (36.5)	−4.3 (24.3)	6.8 (44.2)
Mean daily minimum °C (°F)	−12.9 (8.8)	−11.8 (10.8)	−6.6 (20.1)	0.5 (32.9)	7.4 (45.3)	12.4 (54.3)	15.1 (59.2)	14.2 (57.6)	10.0 (50.0)	4.3 (39.7)	−1.6 (29.1)	−8.4 (16.9)	1.9 (35.4)
Record low °C (°F)	−37.0 (−34.6)	−31.8 (−25.2)	−29.1 (−20.4)	−15.0 (5.0)	−3.2 (26.2)	1.7 (35.1)	5.9 (42.6)	4.1 (39.4)	−3.1 (26.4)	−7.3 (18.9)	−19.2 (−2.6)	−30.0 (−22.0)	−37.0 (−34.6)
Record low wind chill	−39.9	−41.0	−39.7	−23.9	−7.0	—	—	—	−3.9	−10.0	−24.5	−37.9	−41.0
Source: Environment Canada November record high

== Demographics ==
Population trend
Census	Population	Change (%)
2021	1,123	▲1.1%
2016	1,111	▲0.6%
2011	1,094	▲6.2%
2006	1,030	▼4.7%
2001	1,081	▲3.1%
1996	1,048	▼1.7%
1991	1,066	▲3.0%
1986	1,035	N/A

Mother tongue language (2021)
Language	Population	Pct (%)
French only	845	75.1%
English only	200	17.8%
Both English and French	40	3.6%
Other languages	30	2.7%

== Infrastructure ==
Frelighsburg is crossed by the Route 237. Route 213 starts in Frelighsburgh.

== Gallery ==
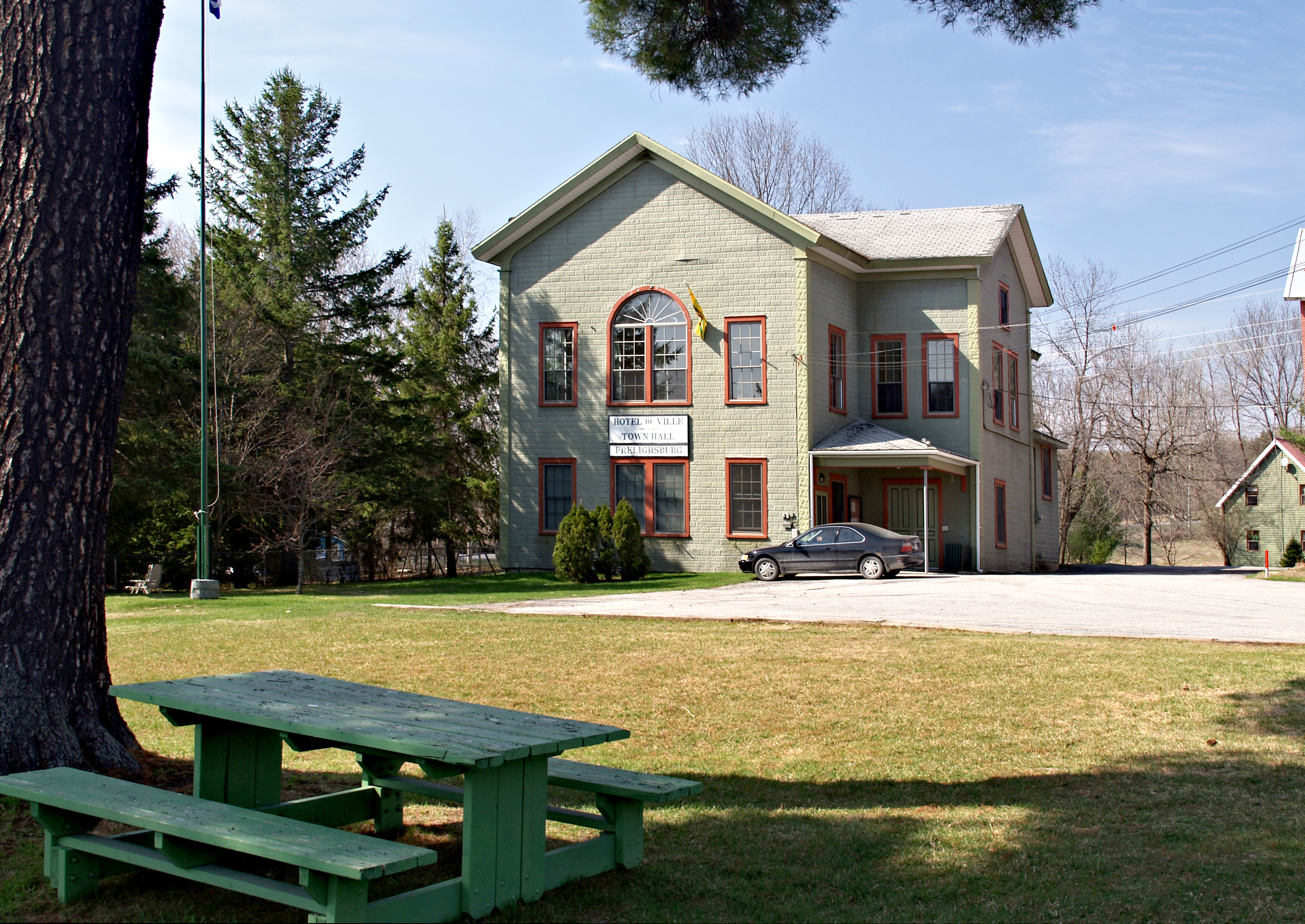
Frelighsburg Town Hall

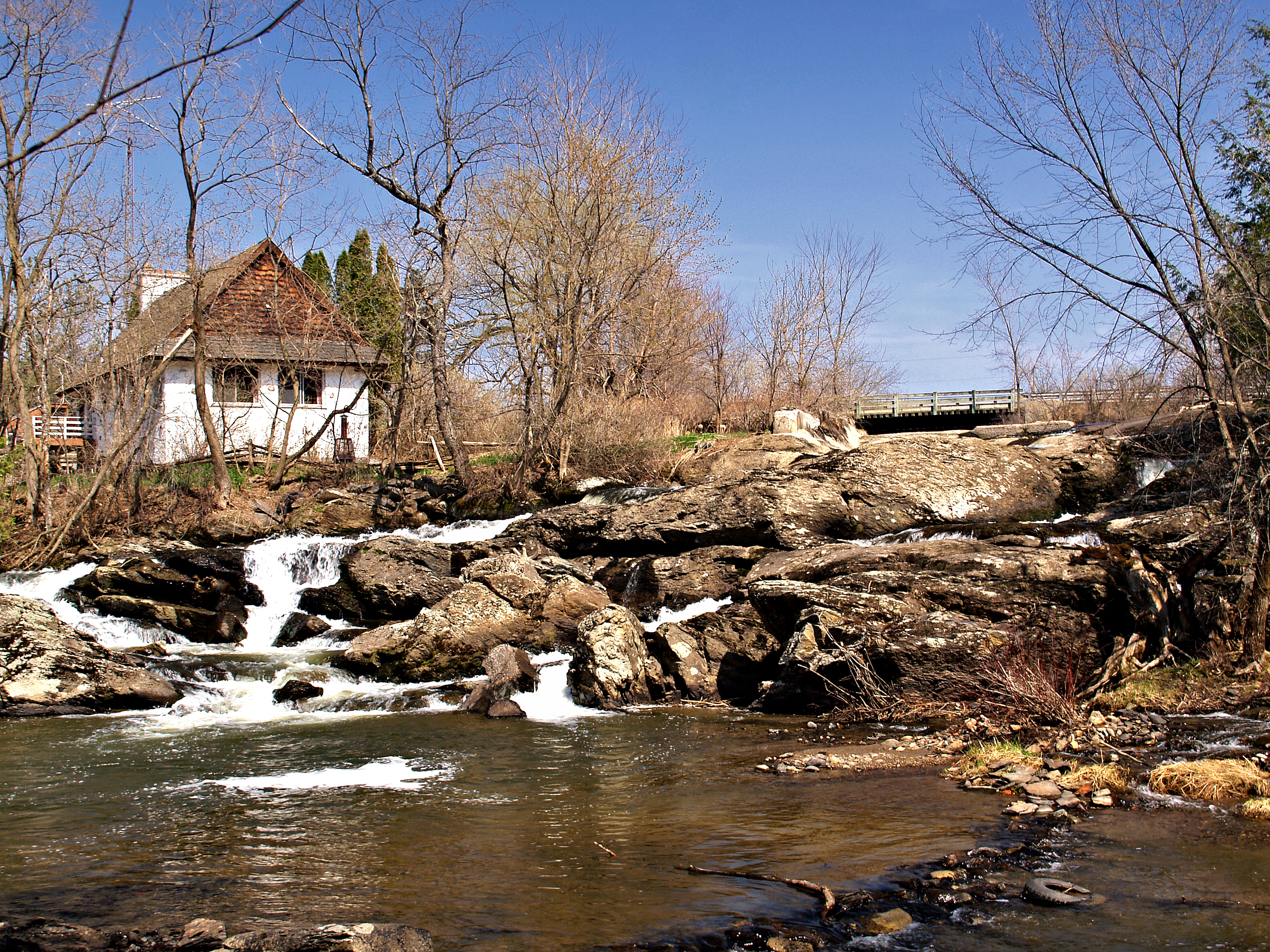
Hunter Falls

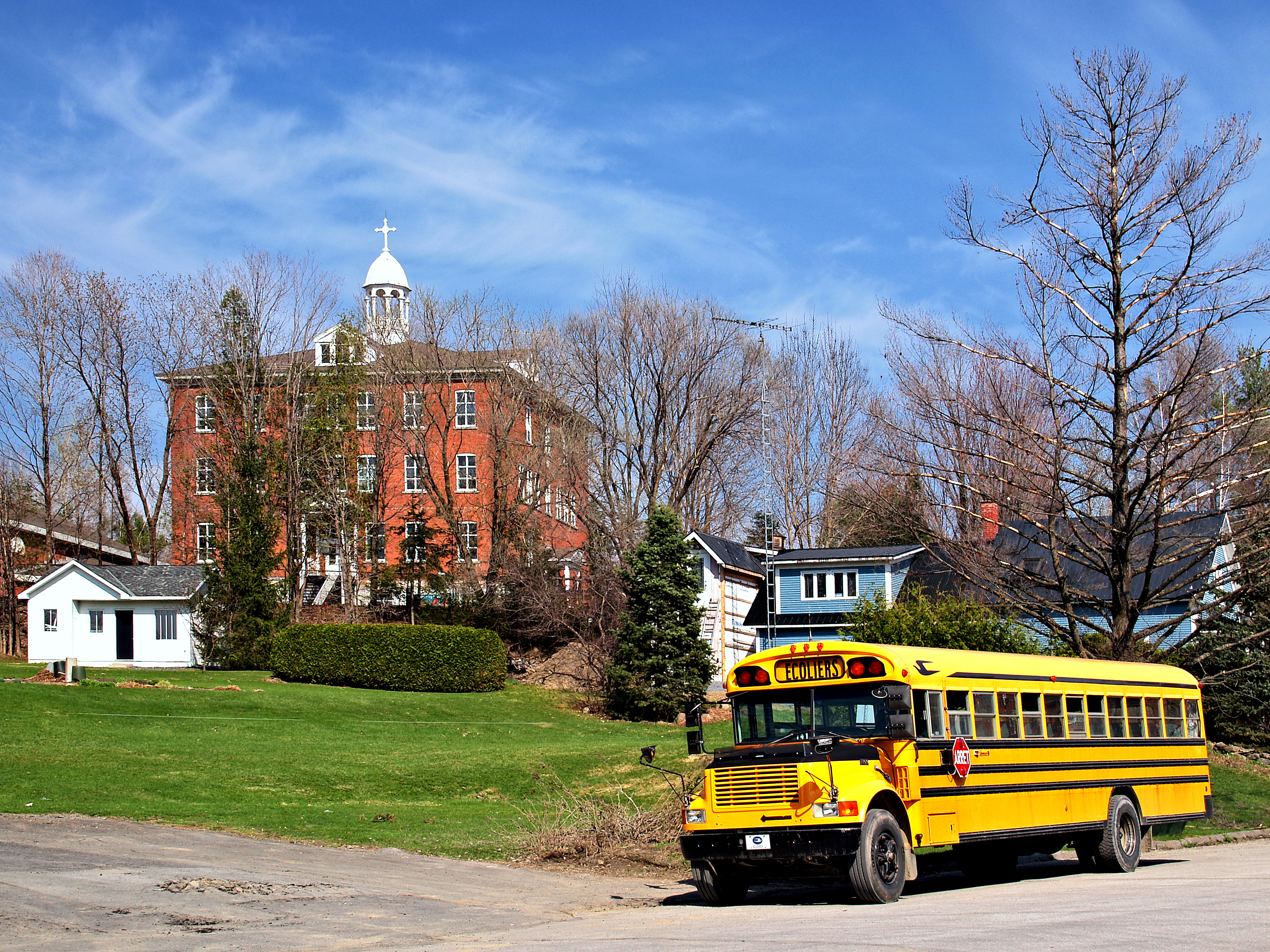
Ecole Saint-François d'Assise

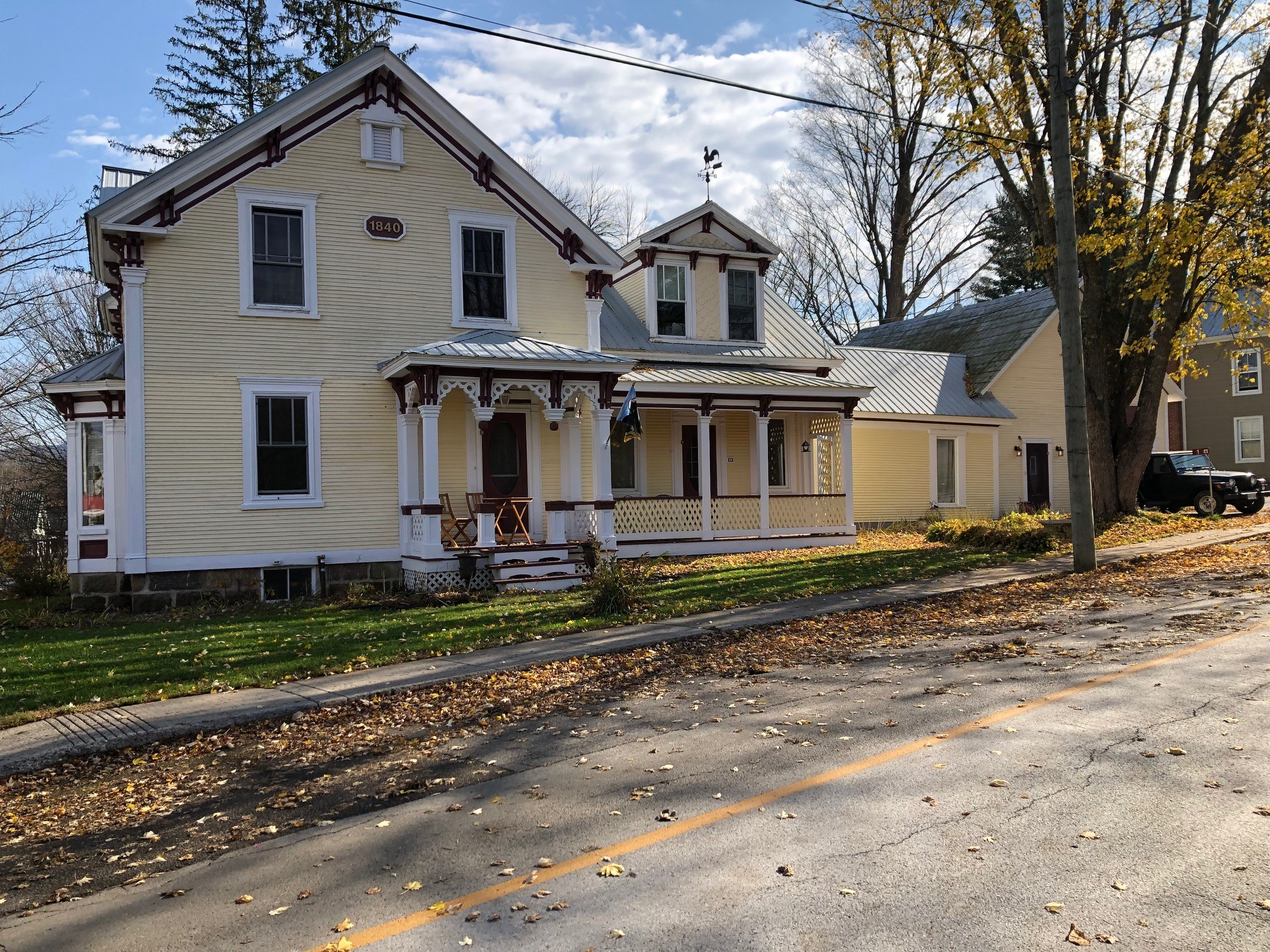
Orchard - Maison d'époque.

== See also ==
- List of anglophone communities in Quebec
- List of municipalities in Quebec
