= Pike River, Quebec =

Pike River
- Municipality
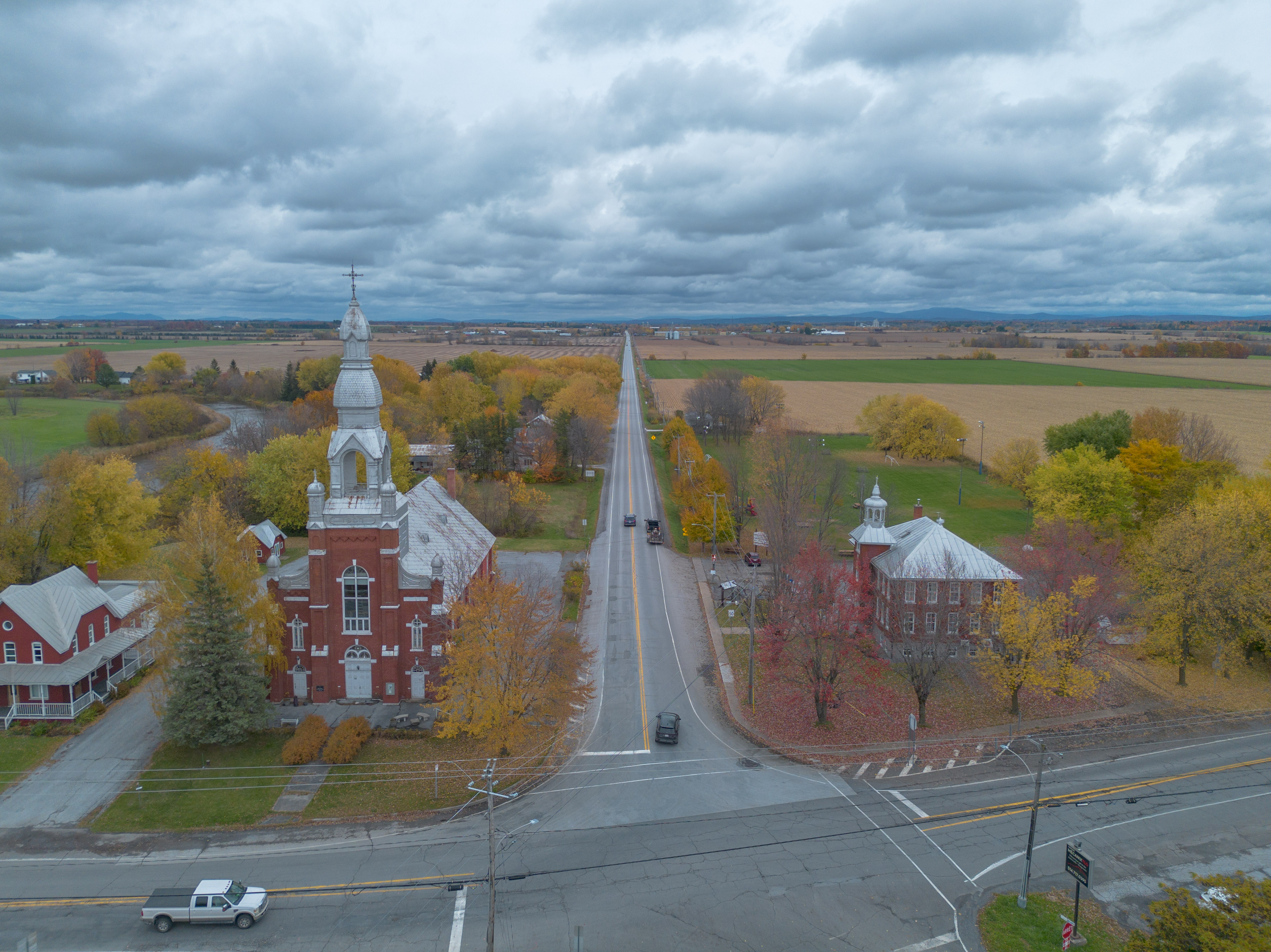
- Pike River in 2025

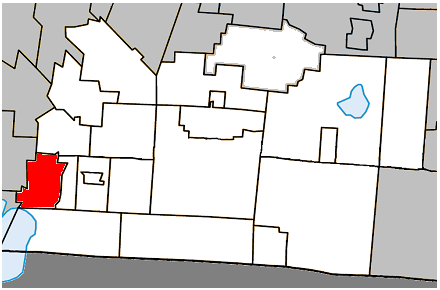
- Location within Brome-Missisquoi RCM.

- Location in southern Quebec.
- Coordinates: 45°07′N 73°04′W
- Country: Canada
- Province: Quebec
- Region: Estrie
- RCM: Brome-Missisquoi
- Constituted: April 3, 1912

Government
  - Mayor: Martin Bellefroid
  - Federal riding: Brome—Missisquoi
  - Prov. riding: Brome-Missisquoi

Area
  - Total: 41.80 km^{2} (16.14 sq mi)
  - Land: 40.79 km^{2} (15.75 sq mi)

Population (2011)
  - Total: 525
  - Density: 12.9/km^{2} (33/sq mi)
  - Pop 2006-2011: ▼3.1%
  - Dwellings: 252
- Time zone: UTC−5 (EST)
  - Summer (DST): UTC−4 (EDT)
- Postal code(s): J0J 1P0
- Area codes: 450 and 579
- Highways: R-133; R-202
- Website: www.pikeriver.ca

Pike River is a municipality in Brome-Missisquoi Regional County Municipality in the Estrie region of Quebec, Canada. The population as of the Canada 2011 Census was 525.

Until May 5, 2012, it was known as Saint-Pierre-de-Véronne-à-Pike-River.

== Demographics ==
=== Population ===
Population trend:

Census	Population	Change (%)
2011	525	▼3.1%
2006	542	▼9.7%
2001	600	▼2.3%
1996	614	▼3.9%
1991	639	N/A

=== Language ===
Mother tongue language (2006)

Language	Population	Pct (%)
French only	465	86.92%
English only	35	6.54%
Both English and French	0	0.00%
Other languages	35	6.54%

== Photo gallery ==
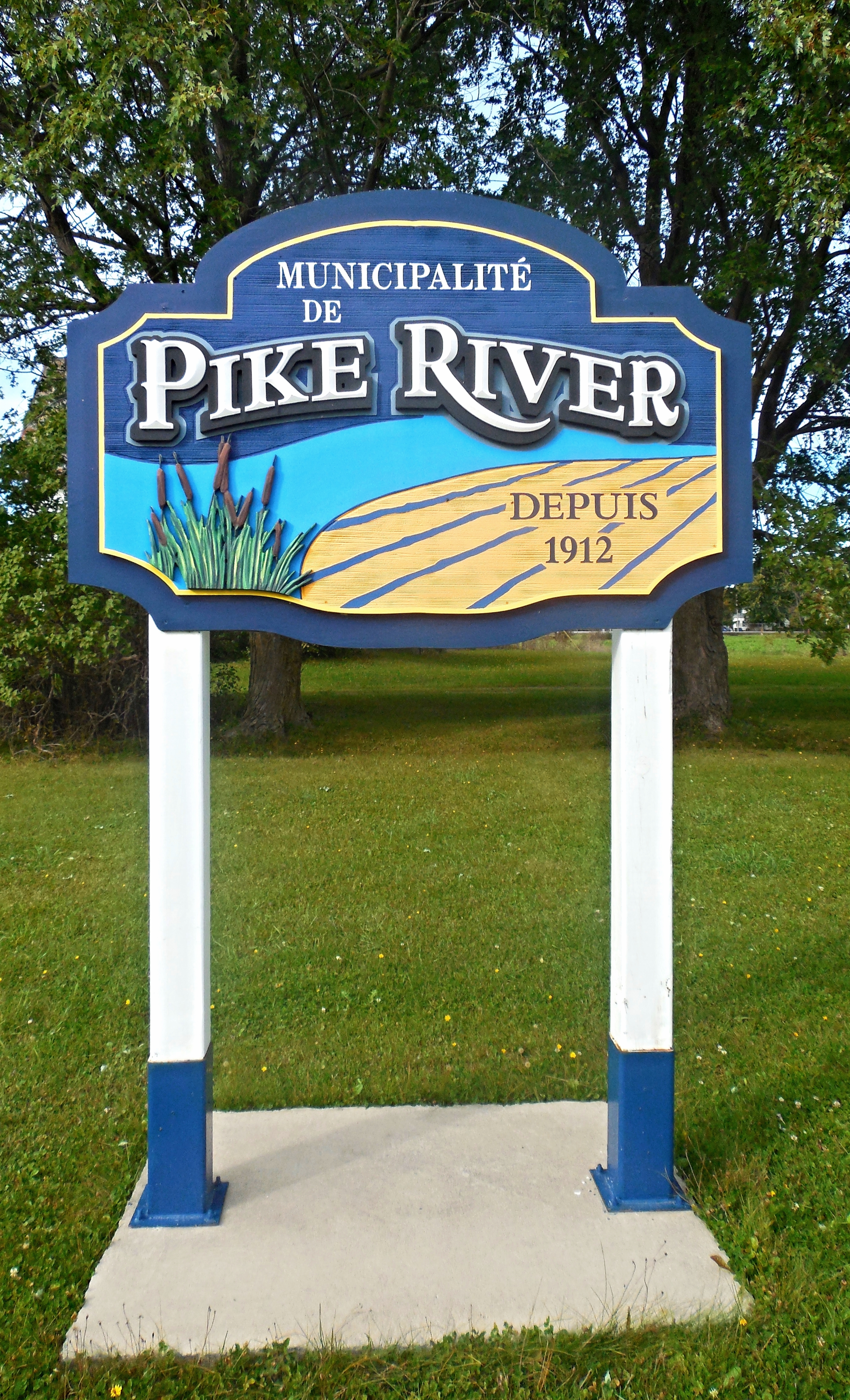
Pike River, Montérégie gateway sign on Quebec Route 133

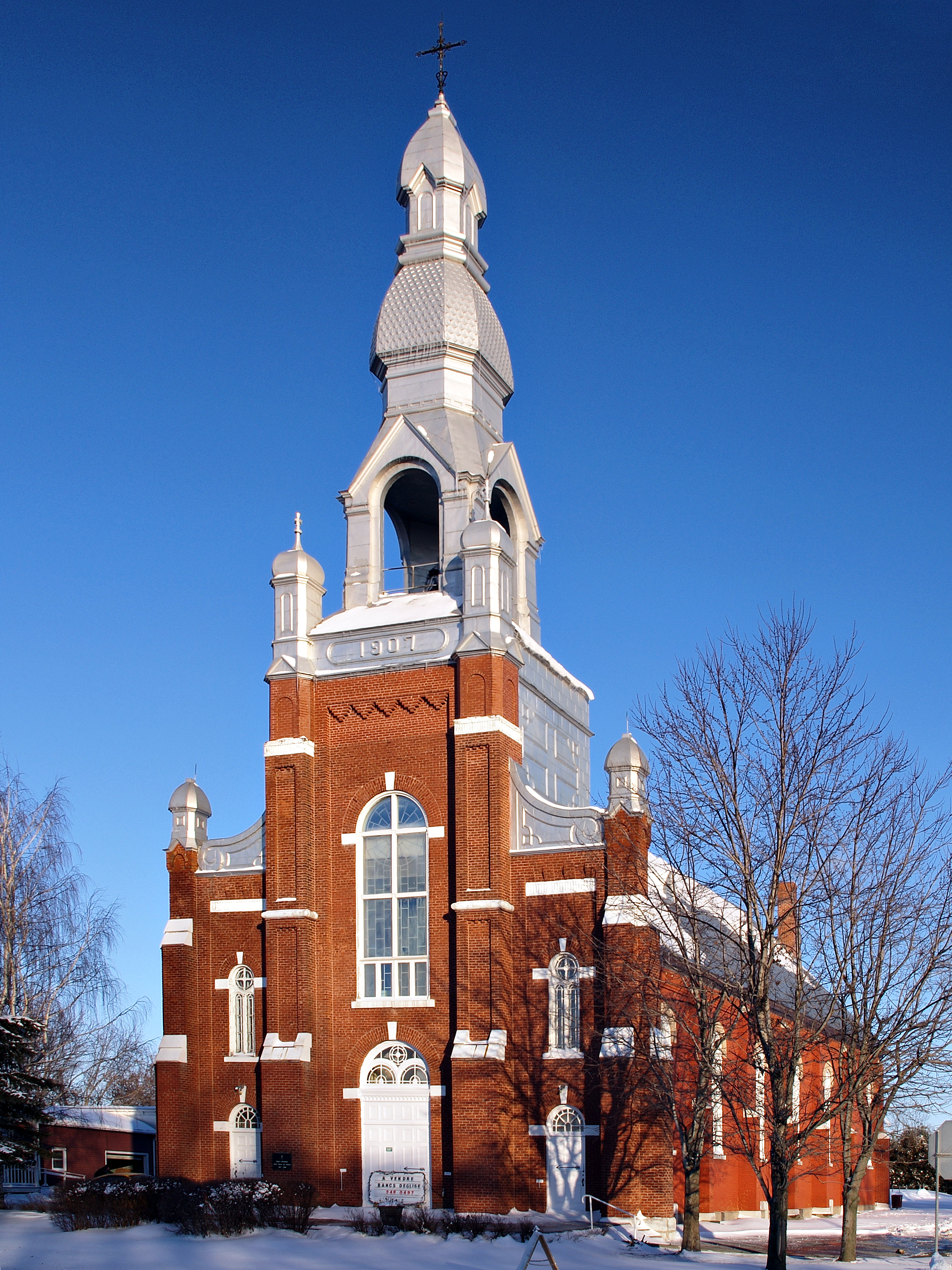
St-Pierre-de-Vérone Catholic Church

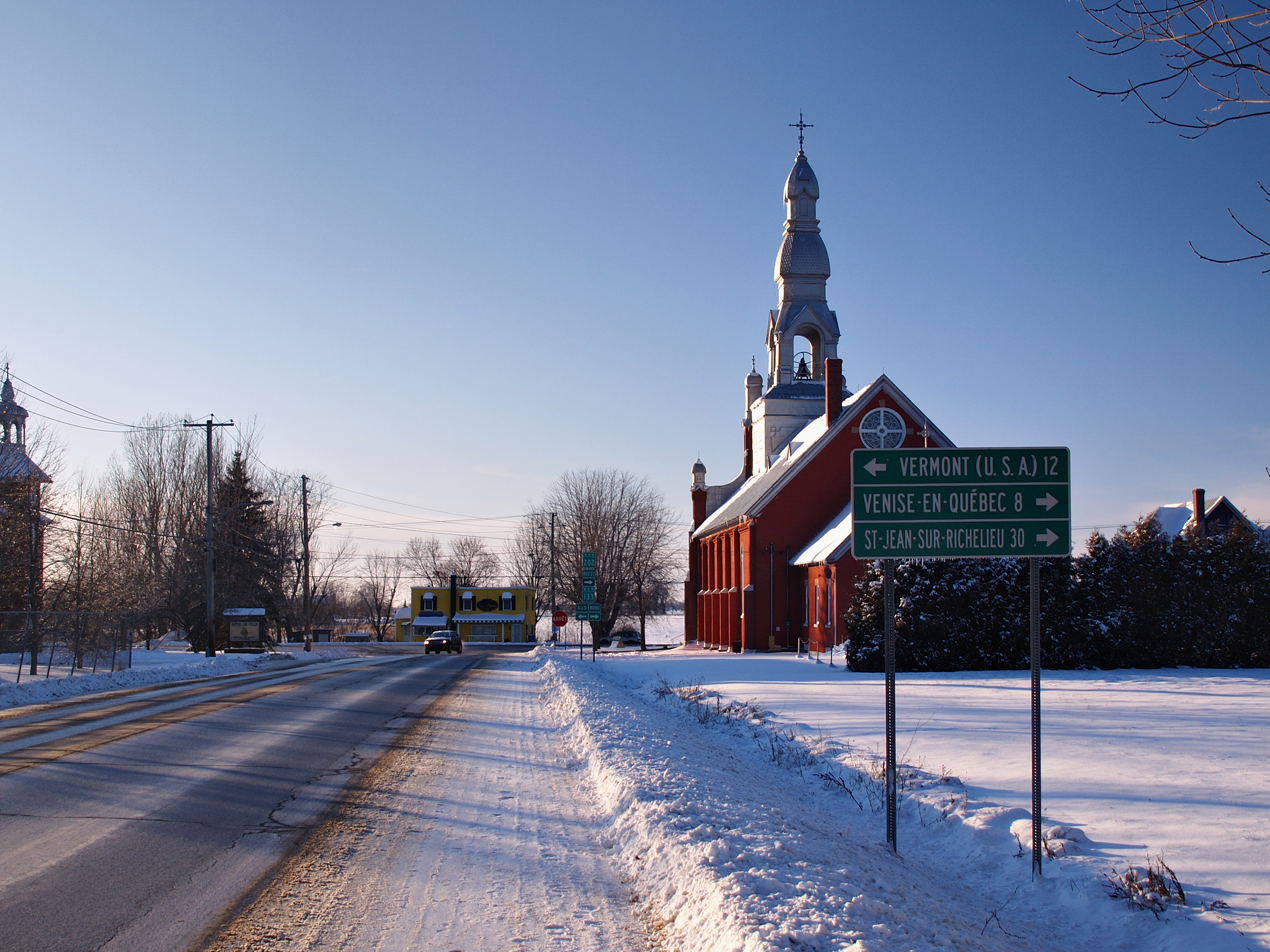
Pike River in 2008

== See also ==
- List of anglophone communities in Quebec
- List of municipalities in Quebec
