= Saint-Armand, Quebec =

Saint-Armand
- Municipality
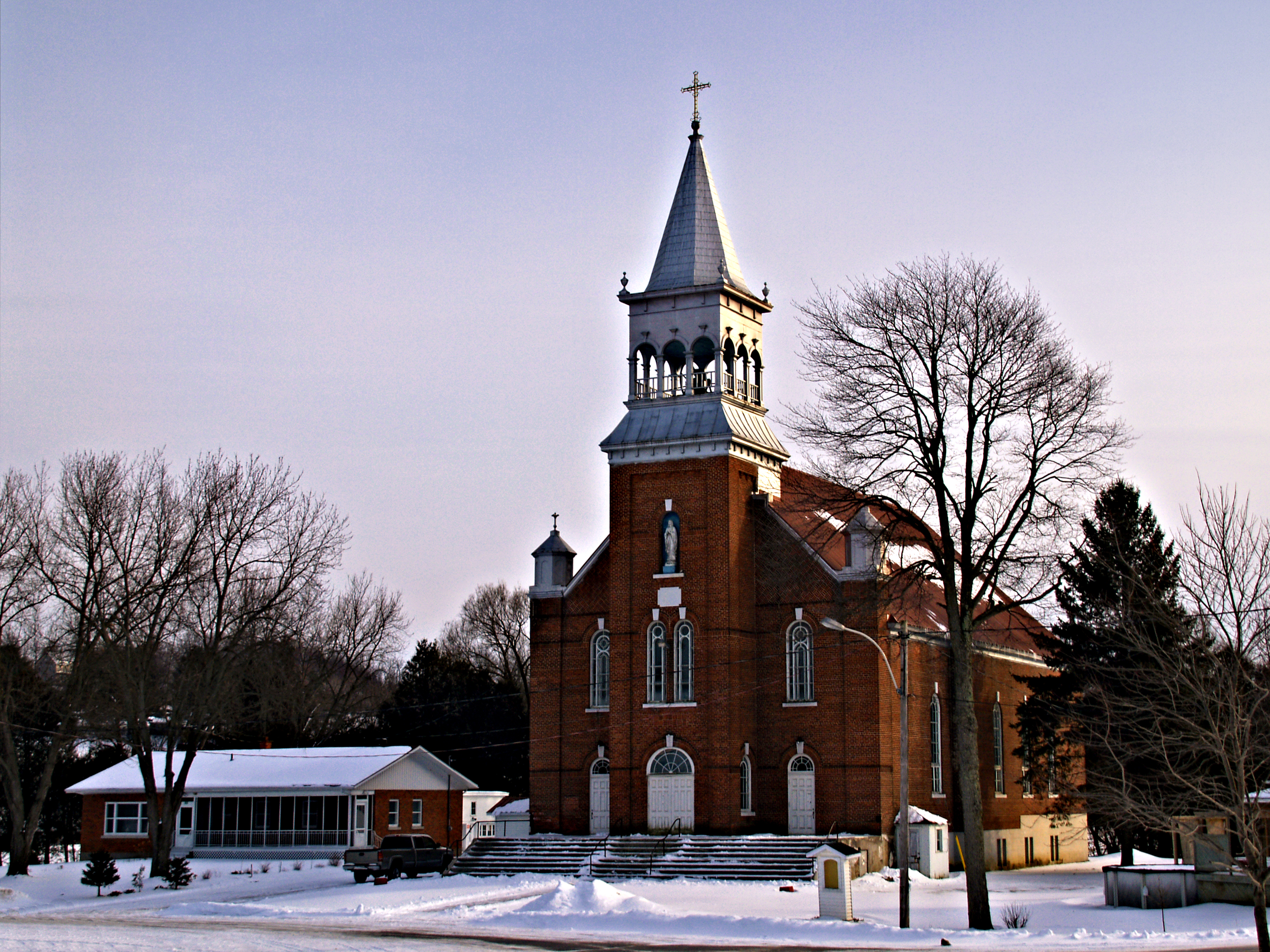

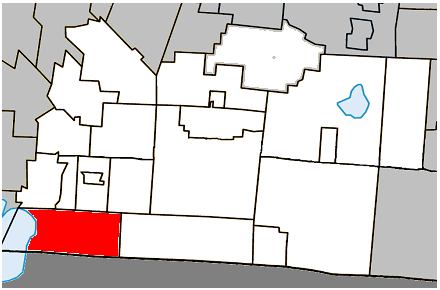
- Location within Brome-Missisquoi RCM

- Location in southern Quebec
- Coordinates: 45°02′N 73°03′W
- Country: Canada
- Province: Quebec
- Region: Estrie
- RCM: Brome-Missisquoi
- Constituted: February 3, 1999

Government
  - Mayor: Caroline Rosetti
  - Federal riding: Brome—Missisquoi
  - Prov. riding: Brome-Missisquoi

Area
  - Total: 84.00 km^{2} (32.43 sq mi)
  - Land: 82.88 km^{2} (32.00 sq mi)

Population (2011)
  - Total: 1,248
  - Density: 15.1/km^{2} (39/sq mi)
  - Pop 2006-2011: ▲7.0%
  - Dwellings: 671
- Time zone: UTC−5 (EST)
  - Summer (DST): UTC−4 (EDT)
- Postal code(s): J0J 1T0
- Area code: 450
- Highways: R-133
- Website: www.municipalite.saint-armand.qc.ca

Saint-Armand (French pronunciation: [sɛ̃t‿aʁmɑ̃]) is a municipality in the Canadian province of Quebec, located within the Brome-Missisquoi Regional County Municipality and the Eastern Townships. The population as of the Canada 2011 Census was 1,248. It is located on the Canada–United States border.

The Municipality of Saint-Armand and the Village of Philipsburg were amalgamated on February 3, 1999 to become the new Municipality of Saint-Armand.

Philipsburg, first known as Missiskoui Bay, was settled in 1784 and was reportedly the first settlement in the Eastern Townships. Saint-Armand, earlier known as Moore's Corners, was the site of the Skirmish at Moore's Corners, an 1837 battle in the Lower Canada Rebellion and the Battle of Eccles Hill during the Fenian Raids.

== Demographics ==
=== Population ===
Population trend:

Census	Population	Change (%)
2011	1,248	▲7.0%
2006	1,166	▼7.7%
2001	1,263	▼2.2%
Merger	1,292 (+)	▲19.0%
1996	1,047	▲2.3%
1991	1,023	N/A

(+) Amalgamation of the Municipality of Saint-Armand and the Village of Philipsburg on February 3, 1999.

=== Language ===
Mother tongue language (2006)

Language	Population	Pct (%)
French only	595	51.96%
English only	395	34.50%
Both English and French	0	0.00%
Other languages	155	13.54%

In addition to its French and English speaking populations, Saint-Armand is home to a number of Germanophones, with about 11% of the population speaking the language as of 2011.

== Notable people ==
- Polly Barber, businesswoman
- Maria Elise Turner Lauder, writer
- Langley Frank Willard Smith, World War I flying ace

== See also ==
- History of Quebec
- List of anglophone communities in Quebec
- List of municipalities in Quebec
- Nigger Rock – a cemetery of free and enslaved black people
