= Stanbridge East =

- Municipality
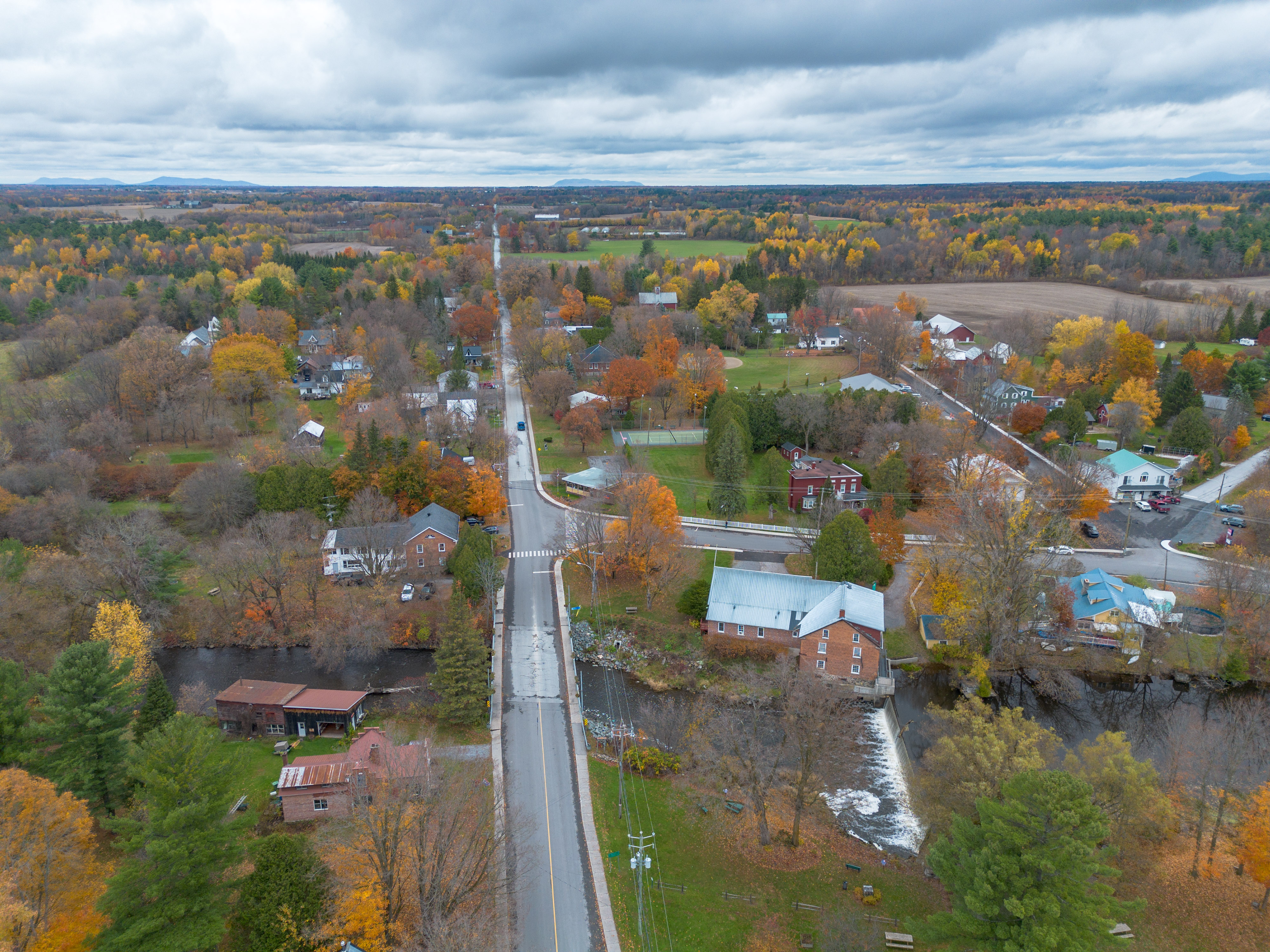
- Stanbridge East in 2025

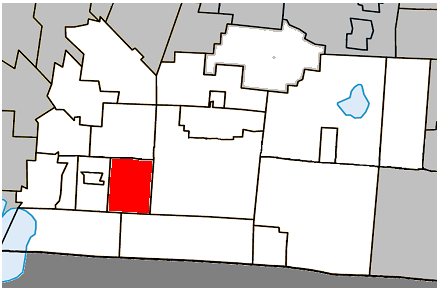
- Location within Brome-Missisquoi RCM.

- Location in southern Quebec.
- Coordinates: 45°07′N 72°55′W
- Country: Canada
- Province: Quebec
- Region: Estrie
- RCM: Brome-Missisquoi
- Constituted: July 1, 1855

Government
  - Mayor: Gregory Vaughan
  - Federal riding: Brome—Missisquoi
  - Prov. riding: Brome-Missisquoi

Area
  - Total: 49.90 km^{2} (19.27 sq mi)
  - Land: 49.14 km^{2} (18.97 sq mi)

Population (2011)
  - Total: 873
  - Density: 17.8/km^{2} (46/sq mi)
  - Pop 2006-2011: ▲4.8%
  - Dwellings: 383
- Time zone: UTC−5 (EST)
  - Summer (DST): UTC−4 (EDT)
- Postal code(s): J0J 2H0
- Area codes: 450 and 579
- Highways: R-202; R-237
- Website: www.stanbridgeeast.ca

Stanbridge East is a municipality in the Canadian province of Quebec, located within the Brome-Missisquoi Regional County Municipality. The population as of the Canada 2011 Census was 873.

== History ==
The Township of Stanbridge was first surveyed by Jesse Pennoyer in the year 1792. It was subsequently opened for settlement, reversing the old policy of "no settlements along the frontier." In 1997, the township changed its form of government and became Stanbridge East. The village became the film location for the fictional setting of Three Pines, Quebec, in the 2013 made-for-television movie Still Life, based on Louise Penny's novel of the same title about Chief Inspector Armand Gamache.

== Demographics ==
=== Population ===
Population trend:

Census	Population	Change (%)
2011	873	▲4.8%
2006	833	▼8.3%
2001	908	▲6.1%
1996	856	▼0.5%
1991	860	N/A

=== Language ===
Mother tongue language (2006)

Language	Population	Pct (%)
French only	355	42.77%
English only	410	49.40%
Both English and French	45	5.42%
Other languages	20	2.41%

== See also ==
- List of anglophone communities in Quebec
- List of municipalities in Quebec
