= Rivière du Sud (Richelieu River tributary) =

Location
- Country: Canada
- Province: Quebec
- Région: Montérégie
- Regional County Municipality: Le Haut-Richelieu
- Municipality: Henryville

Physical characteristics
- Source: Confluence of Méthé and Martel streams.
  - location: Saint-Alexandre
  - coordinates: 45.189604°N 73.142087°E
  - elevation: 41 m (135 ft)
- Mouth: Richelieu River
  - location: Henryville
  - coordinates: 45°08′10″N 73°15′08″W
  - elevation: 33 m (108 ft)
- Length: 39.1 km (24.3 mi)

Basin features
- Tributaries
  - left: (Upstream) Hauver-Métivier stream, Boue stream, Adams stream, L'Écuyer stream, Lamoureux stream, La Grande landfill, Martel stream.
  - right: (Upstream) Melaven brook, Lefebvre brook, Terres Noires brook, Breton brook, Méthé brook.

The Rivière du Sud (French pronunciation: [ʁivjɛʁ dy syd], "River of the South") is a tributary of the Richelieu River, flowing successively in the municipalities of Saint-Alexandre, Saint-Sébastien, Clarenceville and Henryville, in the Le Haut-Richelieu Regional County Municipality, in Montérégie, on the south shore of Fleuve Saint-Laurent, in province of Quebec, in Canada.

Agriculture is the main economic activity in this small valley; forestry, second in the lower part of the river.

The river surface is generally frozen from mid-December to the end of March. Safe traffic on the ice is generally from late December to early March. The water level of the river varies with the seasons and the precipitation.

== Geography ==
The main hydrographic slopes neighboring the "Rivière du Sud" are:

- north side: rivière des Hurons;
- east side: Yamaska River;
- south side: lake Champlain, Missisquoi Bay;
- west side: Richelieu River.

The Rivière du Sud takes its head water from the confluence of the streams Méthé and Martel, in agricultural zone. This source is located at 4.3 kilometres (2.7 mi) at the south of the village of Saint-Alexandre which is located on the south side of Mont Saint-Grégoire.

The South River flows 10.8 km southwest to the south of the village of Saint-Alexandre in agricultural areas, passing east of the village of Henryville, to the limit of the marsh areas. Then, the river flows for 3.4 km to the southwest, in the marsh area, to the outlet of the Boue stream (coming from the south) located 350 m west of Pont Couture. This last segment, the South River splits; and the second course runs in parallel (on the south side) for 3.4 km passing north of Hawley's Corner.

The last segment, the Rivière du Sud, flows 5.4 km north, in marsh areas, passing under the Métier bridge (ie route 225), to reach the east bank of the Richelieu River, forming a point advancing towards the north, designated "Pointe du Gouvernement".

The mouth of the South River is located on the limits of the seigneuries of Noyan and Sabrevois, very close to Île aux Noix, 16.7 km downstream from the Jean-Jacques-Bertrand bridge located at Lacolle and 26.7 km downstream from the Canada-United States border.

== History ==
In 1845, the road from Henryville was extended to Richelieu River where a ferry commuted between "Pointe du Gouvernement" and the quay of Saint-Paul built on the west bank of the Richelieu River. Subsequently, this road segment was abandoned.

Between 1759 and 1760, a blockhouse was erected by French troops in order to protect Île aux Noix from English troops who could come from the south; the risk being that the English troops could circumvent it by using the "river of the South", and another was arranged on the "point of the Government". At the approach of the English troops, they are both abandoned. On the military level, this river had a strategic position, because it was the most direct watercourse to reach Missisquoi Bay and Lake Champlain. Joseph Bouchette, surveyor general of Lower Canada, used the designation "Rivière du Sud" when he wrote: "It is navigable for boats and canoes for about six miles" (Topographic description the province from Lower Canada, 1815).

== Toponymy ==
The first settlers to settle in this sector came from Cap-Saint-Ignace (region Chaudière-Appalaches) where there is also a "southern river". These settlers would have used the same toponym.

The toponym "Rivière du Sud" was formalized on December 5, 1968 at the Place Names Bank of the Commission de toponymie du Québec.

== See also ==
- Le Haut-Richelieu Regional County Municipality
- Richelieu River, a stream
- Île aux Noix
- Henryville, a municipality
- Saint-Alexandre, a municipality
- Saint-Sébastien, a municipality
- Clarenceville, a municipality
- Mont Saint-Grégoire, a mountain
- List of rivers of Quebec
