= Rivière du Sud-Ouest (Yamaska River tributary) =

River in Quebec, Canada

Location
- Country: Canada
- Province: Quebec
- Region: Montérégie
- Regional County Municipality: Le Haut-Richelieu Regional County Municipality, Brome-Missisquoi Regional County Municipality et Rouville Regional County Municipality

Physical characteristics
- Source: Various agricultural streams
  - location: Farham
  - coordinates: 45°23′34″N 73°00′17″W
  - elevation: 53 m (174 ft)
- Mouth: Saint Lawrence River
  - location: Saint-Césaire
  - coordinates: 45.39278°N 73.00472°W
  - elevation: 30 m (98 ft)
- Length: 17.7 km (11.0 mi)

Basin features
- Tributaries
  - left: (Upstream) Beaudry stream, Létourneau-Beaudoin stream, Martel stream, Pierre-Lalanne stream.
  - right: (Upstream) Écossais River, Patenaud-Robert outlet, Cirque stream, Thimothé-Martel-Giroux stream, Louis-Boulais stream, Fronteau stream.

The Rivière du Sud-Ouest (French pronunciation: [ʁivjɛʁ dy syd wɛst], "River of the South-West") is a tributary of the Yamaska River. It flows in the administrative region of Montérégie, on the South Shore of the St. Lawrence River, in Quebec, Canada. Its course towards the northeast crosses the municipalities of:

- Farnham, in Brome-Missisquoi Regional County Municipality;
- Sainte-Brigide-d'Iberville, in Le Haut-Richelieu Regional County Municipality;
- Saint-Césaire, in Rouville Regional County Municipality.

== Geography ==
The main hydrographic slopes adjacent to the Southwest River are:

- North side: rivière des Hurons;
- East side: Écossais River, Yamaska River;
- South side: Pike River, Missisquoi Bay;
- West side: Bleury stream, Richelieu River.

The "Rivière du Sud-Ouest" rises from various agricultural streams located around the hamlet Ménardville, west of the village of Farnham, northwest of the village of Sainte-Sabine, south of the village of Sainte-Brigide-d'Iberville, south of route 104 and south of Canadian National Railway section.

From its head (draining a small area of marsh), the Southwest river flows 5.9 km north in agricultural area to the Canadian National railway; 3.0 km north to route 104 in the village of Sainte-Brigide-d'Iberville; 3.6 km north to Martel Creek; 2.4 km northeasterly to autoroute 10; and 3.5 km north-east to its mouth.

The South-West river flows on the west bank of the Yamaska River in the municipality of Saint-Césaire. This mouth is 2.6 km upstream from the Saint-Césaire bridge over the Yamaska River (route 112) and 2.8 km downstream from the Autoroute 10 bridge.

== Toponymy ==
The toponym "Rivière du Sud-Ouest" was officially registered on December 5, 1968 at the Bank of Place Names of the Commission de toponymie du Québec.

== See also ==
- Yamaska River, a stream
- Rivière des Hurons (Richelieu River tributary), a stream
- Écossais River, a stream
- Saint-Césaire, a municipality
- Sainte-Brigide-d'Iberville, a municipality
- Farnham, a municipality
- Rouville Regional County Municipality
- Brome-Missisquoi Regional County Municipality
- List of rivers of Quebec
