= Écossais River =

River in Montérégie, Quebec, Canada

Écossais River (Scottish River)

Location
- Country: Canada
- Province: Quebec
- Region: Montérégie
- Regional County Municipality: Le Haut-Richelieu Regional County Municipality, Brome-Missisquoi Regional County Municipality et Rouville Regional County Municipality

Physical characteristics
- Source: Various agricultural streams
  - location: Farham
  - coordinates: 43°18′13″N 73°02′11″W
  - elevation: 52 m (171 ft)
- Mouth: Yamaska River
  - location: Saint-Césaire
  - coordinates: 45.39278°N 73.00444°W
  - elevation: 29 m (95 ft)
- Length: 13.5 km (8.4 mi)

Basin features
- Tributaries
  - left: (Upstream) ruisseau François-Paquette, ruisseau Louis-Boulais, ruisseau Beauregard
  - right: (Upstream) ruisseau Boulais, ruisseau Leduc

The Écossais River ('Scottish River') is a tributary of the Yamaska River. It flows in the administrative region of Montérégie, on the South Shore of the Saint Lawrence River, in Quebec, Canada. Its course towards the north-east successively crosses the municipalities of:

- Sainte-Brigide-d'Iberville, MRC of Le Haut-Richelieu Regional County Municipality;
- Farnham, MRC of Brome-Missisquoi;
- Saint-Césaire in the Rouville Regional County Municipality (MRC).

== Geography ==
The main neighboring watersheds of the Écossais River are:

- North side and east side: Yamaska River;
- South side: rivière aux Brochets (Missisquoi Bay tributary), Missisquoi Bay;
- West side: rivière du Sud-Ouest (Yamaska River tributary), Richelieu River.

The "Écossais River" originates from various agricultural and forest streams in the western part of Sainte-Brigide-d'Iberville. This area is located north of the Canadian National railway, south of Autoroute 10, south of route 104 and west of Farnham.

From this head area, the Scottish River flows over:

- 7.1 kilometres (4.4 mi) north in the agricultural zone in Farnham to route 233;
- 2.5 kilometres (1.6 mi) north-west in an agricultural zone along route 233 (on the west side) and collect water from the François-Paquette stream (coming from the south); then cross the latter approximately 240 metres (790 ft) south of Highway 10;
- 0.7 kilometres (0.43 mi) north-east in an agricultural zone to Highway 10 that it crosses;
- 3.2 kilometres (2.0 mi) towards the north-east in an agricultural zone to its mouth.

The mouth of the Scottish River empties into a small bay on the west bank of the Yamaska River. This bay also receives the waters of the Sud-Ouest River. This mouth is 2.6 kilometres (1.6 mi) upstream of the Saint-Césaire bridge over the Yamaska River (route 112) and 2.8 kilometres (1.7 mi) downstream of the highway 10 bridge.

== Toponymy ==
Formerly, this watercourse was designated "Small Southwest River".

The toponym "Rivière des Écossais" was officially registered on August 17, 1978, in the Bank of place names of the Commission de toponymie du Québec.

== See also ==
- Yamaska River, a watercourse
- Rivière du Sud-Ouest, a watercourse
- Saint-Césaire, a municipality
- Sainte-Brigide-d'Iberville, a municipality
- Farnham, a municipality
- Rouville Regional County Municipality (MRC)
- Brome-Missisquoi Regional County Municipality (MRC)
- List of rivers of Quebec
