= 2011 Lake Champlain and Richelieu River floods =

- Lake Champlain and the Richelieu River basin
- Date: April 2011 – End June
- Location: New York Quebec (Montérégie) Vermont
- Deaths: None

The 2011 Lake Champlain and Richelieu River floods were a series of water level increases that began at the end of April 2011 and caused a subsequent overflow of the Richelieu River in Canada and Lake Champlain in the United States. The flooding occurred due to record snowfall in the area followed by its snowmelt and in combination with intense spring rains. Lake Champlain stayed at flood stage for 67 days from April to June, and on May 10, 2011, the lake broke its previous flood level set in 1869 by reaching 102.8 ft. at Rouses Point, New York. The floods affected about 3,000 homes in Montérégie and caused an estimated six million U.S. dollars of damage in seven counties in the northern area of Vermont. The damage was so bad that a state of emergency was declared by Vermont on May 5, 2011. Similar damage was reported in New York State.

In Quebec, the major cities affected by the flooding were Venise-en-Quebec, Noyan, Saint-Jean-sur-Richelieu, Henryville, Saint-Paul-de-l'Île-aux-Noix, and Sainte-Anne-de-Sabrevois. Citizens of Quebec were supplied with safe drinking water by the government due to the prolonged period of time in which the city's water supplies were likely contaminated. On May 5, the Canadian Forces were requested to help evacuate residents and build dikes to try to protect areas at risk.

== Operation Lotus ==
Operation Lotus was the name of the military operation that assisted citizens in the Montérégie area in response to a formal request for assistance from the province of Quebec as a result of this natural disaster. The Canadian Forces worked to limit the damage caused by the worst floods to occur in the valley of the Richelieu River and on Lake Champlain over the previous 150 years. Over 650 Canadian soldiers and sailors participated at one time or another in Operation Lotus until it ended on June 17.
