= Henryville, Quebec =

Henryville
- Municipality
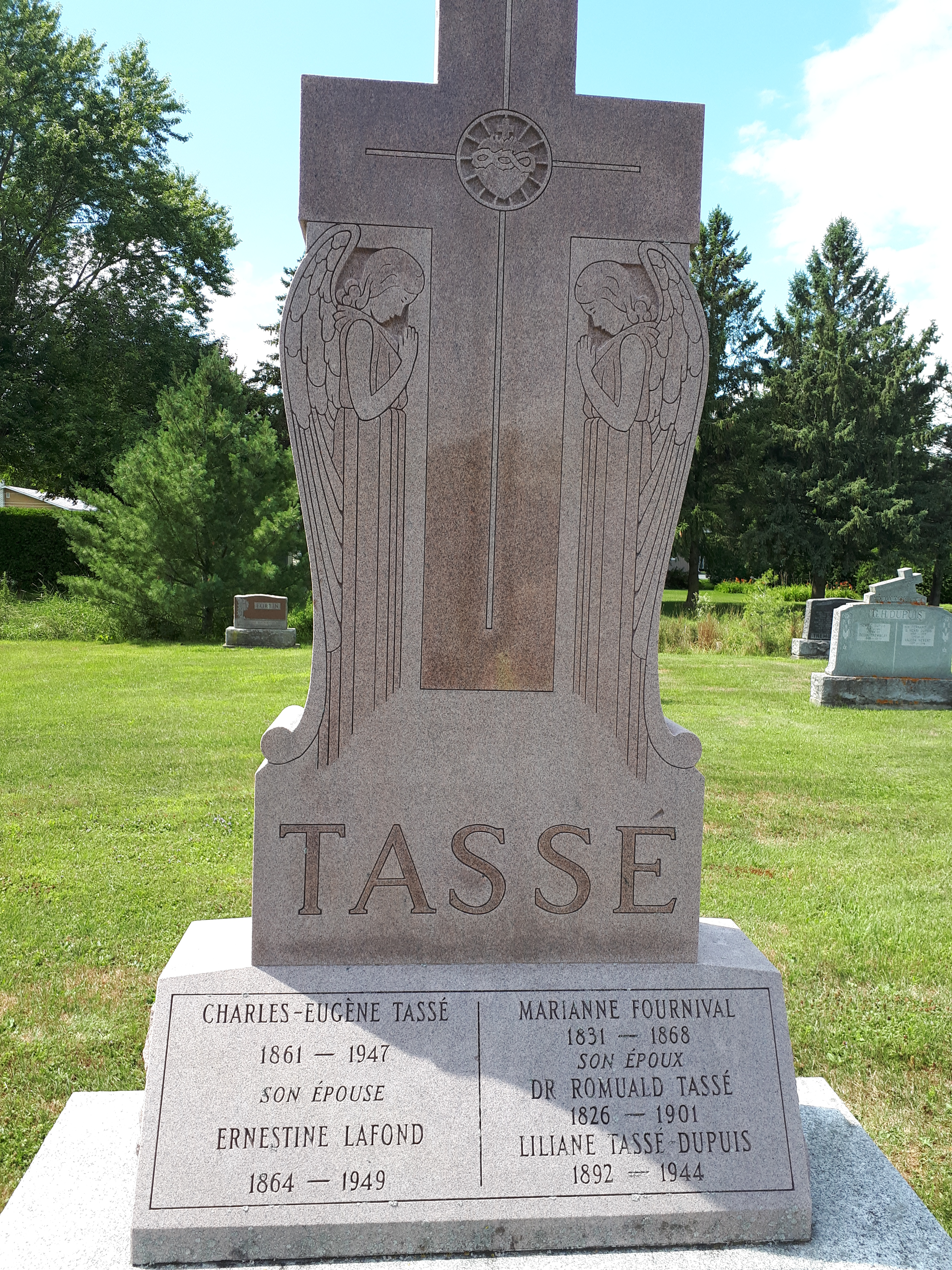

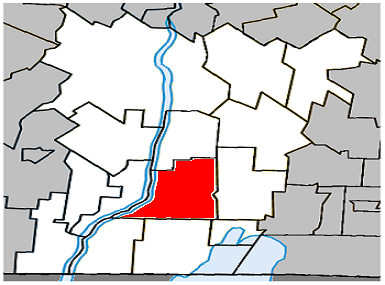
- Location within Le Haut-Richelieu RCM.

- Location in southern Quebec.
- Coordinates: 45°08′N 73°11′W
- Country: Canada
- Province: Quebec
- Region: Montérégie
- RCM: Le Haut-Richelieu
- Constituted: December 15, 1999

Government
  - Mayor: Danielle Charbonneau
  - Federal riding: Brome—Missisquoi
  - Prov. riding: Iberville

Area
  - Total: 69.60 km^{2} (26.87 sq mi)
  - Land: 64.82 km^{2} (25.03 sq mi)

Population (2021)
  - Total: 1,497
  - Density: 23.1/km^{2} (60/sq mi)
  - Pop 2016-2021: ▲6.5%
  - Dwellings: 702
- Time zone: UTC−5 (EST)
  - Summer (DST): UTC−4 (EDT)
- Postal code(s): J0J 1E0
- Area codes: 450 and 579
- Highways: R-133; R-225
- Website: www.municipalite- henryville.com

Henryville (French pronunciation: [ɑ̃ʁivil]) is a municipality in Le Haut-Richelieu Regional County Municipality in the Montérégie region of Quebec, Canada. The population as of the Canada 2021 Census was 1,497. Henryville is the birthplace of Bat Masterson, a figure from the late 19th century U.S. wild west who became a New York City newspaper columnist during the early 20th century.

== History ==
The first settlement of Henryville was founded in 1810 by notary Edme Henry, from whom it took its name. The area covered was vast at the time, including the current municipalities of Saint-Sébastien, Notre-Dame-de-Stanbridge and part of Sainte-Anne-de-Sabrevois.

The municipality was officially created in 1855 under the name of Saint-Georges. During the rest of the 19th century, Saint-Georges lost huge part of its territory when Notre-Dame-des-Anges-de-Stanbridge, Saint-Sébastien and finally, Sainte-Anne-de-Sabrevois became separate municipalities. In 1927, the urban part of Saint-Georges split from the rural part and took the name of Henryville (the name that was used for this area before 1855). In 1957, the rest of Saint-Georges also switches its name to Henryville. Finally, in 1999, the village of Henryville (urban) was merged with the rest of the municipality of Henryville (rural) to form a single entity once again. The municipality was severely affected by the 2011 Lake Champlain and Richelieu River floods.

== Demographics ==
Population

Canada census – Henryville community profile

	2021	2016	2011
Population	1,497 (+6.5% from 2016)	1,406 (-4.0% from 2011)	1,464 (-4.3% from 2006)
Land area	64.82 km^{2} (25.03 sq mi)	65.41 km^{2} (25.25 sq mi)	64.92 km^{2} (25.07 sq mi)
Population density	23.1/km^{2} (60/sq mi)	21.5/km^{2} (56/sq mi)	22.6/km^{2} (59/sq mi)
Median age	42.8 (M: 42.4, F: 44.4)	46.1 (M: 45.3, F: 47.6)	46.9 (M: 47.0, F: 46.8)
Private dwellings	702 (total) 612 (occupied)	697 (total)	719 (total)
Median household income	$70,500	$57,259	$49,876

References: 2021 2016 2011

Historical Census Data - Henryville, Quebec

Year	Pop.	±%
1861	5,389	—
1871	1,918	−64.4%
1881	1,770	−7.7%
1891	1,324	−25.2%
1901	1,110	−16.2%
1911	991	−10.7%
1921	994	+0.3%
1931	654	−34.2%

Year	Pop.	±%
1941	634	−3.1%
1951	677	+6.8%
1956	752	+11.1%
1961	828	+10.1%
1966	806	−2.7%
1971	806	+0.0%
1976	793	−1.6%
1981	791	−0.3%

Year	Pop.	±%
1986	762	−3.7%
1991	791	+3.8%
1996	857	+8.3%
2001	1,482	+72.9%
2006	1,529	+3.2%
2011	1,464	−4.3%
2016	1,406	−4.0%
2021	1,497	+6.5%

Language

Canada Census Mother Tongue - Henryville, Quebec
Census	Total	French			English			French & English			Other		
Year	Responses	Count	Trend	Pop %	Count	Trend	Pop %	Count	Trend	Pop %	Count	Trend	Pop %
2021	1,475	1,345	▲3.9%	91.2%	55	▼8.3%	3.7%	25	▲150.0%	1.7%	45	▲28.6%	3.1%
2016	1,410	1,295	▼0.4%	91.8%	60	▼29.4%	4.3%	10	▼33.3%	0.7%	35	▼12.5%	2.5%
2011	1,440	1,300	▼1.5%	90.3%	85	▼10.5%	5.9%	15	▼25.0%	1.0%	40	0.0%	2.8%
2006	1,475	1,320	▲3.1%	89.5%	95	0.0%	6.4%	20	▼33.3%	1.4%	40	0.0%	2.7%
2001	1,445	1,280	▲75.3%	88.6%	95	▲280.0%	6.6%	30	▲200.0%	2.1%	40	▼46.7%	2.8%
1996	840	730	n/a	86.9%	25	n/a	3.0%	10	n/a	1.2%	75	n/a	8.9%

== See also ==
- List of municipalities in Quebec
- 20th-century municipal history of Quebec
