= Alburgh–Noyan Border Crossing =

Canada–United States border crossing

Alburgh-Noyan Border Crossing
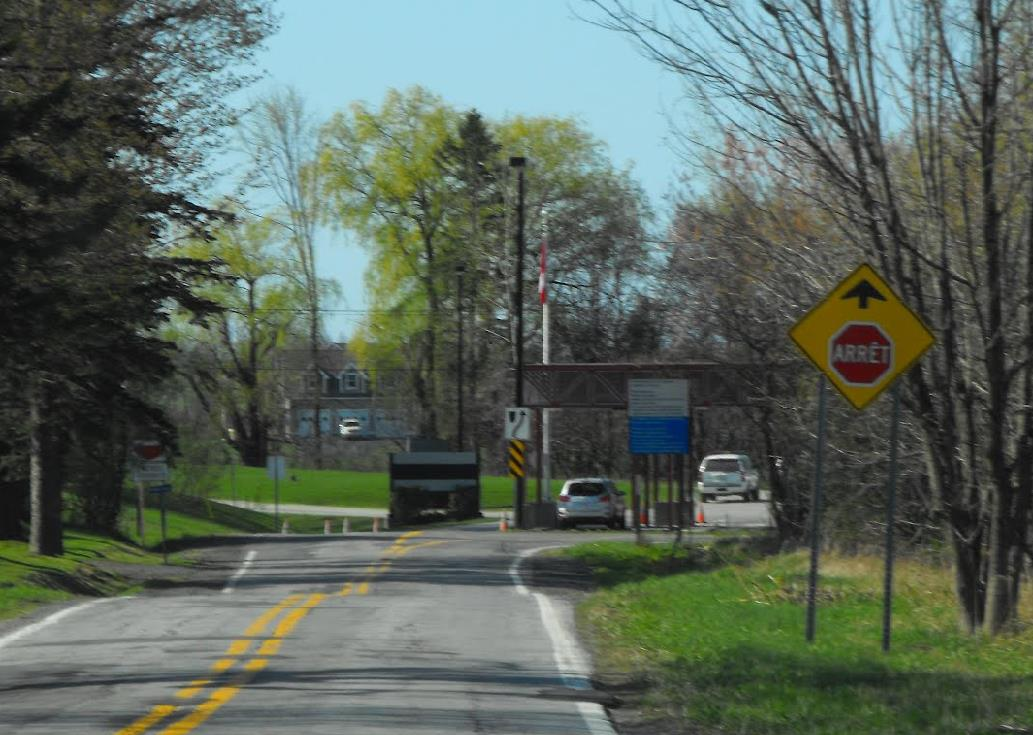
- Alburgh-Noyan Joint Border Inspection Station

Location
- Country: United States; Canada
- Location: VT 225 / R-225; US Port: Border Road, Alburgh, Vermont 05440; Canadian Port: 6 Route 225, Noyan, Quebec J0J 1B0
- Coordinates: 45.01151°N 73.296618°W

Details
- Opened: 1900

Website
- https://www.cbp.gov/contact/ports/highgate-springs-vermont-0212

The Alburgh–Noyan Border Crossing connects the villages of Noyan, Quebec with Alburgh, Vermont on the Canada–US border. It is reached by Vermont Route 225 on the American side and by Quebec Route 225 on the Canadian side. It is the westernmost border crossing in Vermont.

The Noyan/Alburgh port of entry is a single building that houses both the US and Canada border inspection agencies, the first of five such facilities. While the two nations' agents work separately, they share the kitchen but have their own cell. In the kitchen, they used to share the same refrigerator but now each has their own. In the middle of the building, there are two large doors with two marks for the official border line markings. Canadian officers are often called for French translation to help their US coworkers. It is the only crossing east of the Great Lakes that features a joint border inspection station. It was built in 1987, one of just two created prior to the 1995 Canada-United States Accord on Our Shared Border.

Note that while CBP currently (and historically) spells the border station "Alburg", the municipality changed its spelling to "Alburgh" in 2006.

== History ==
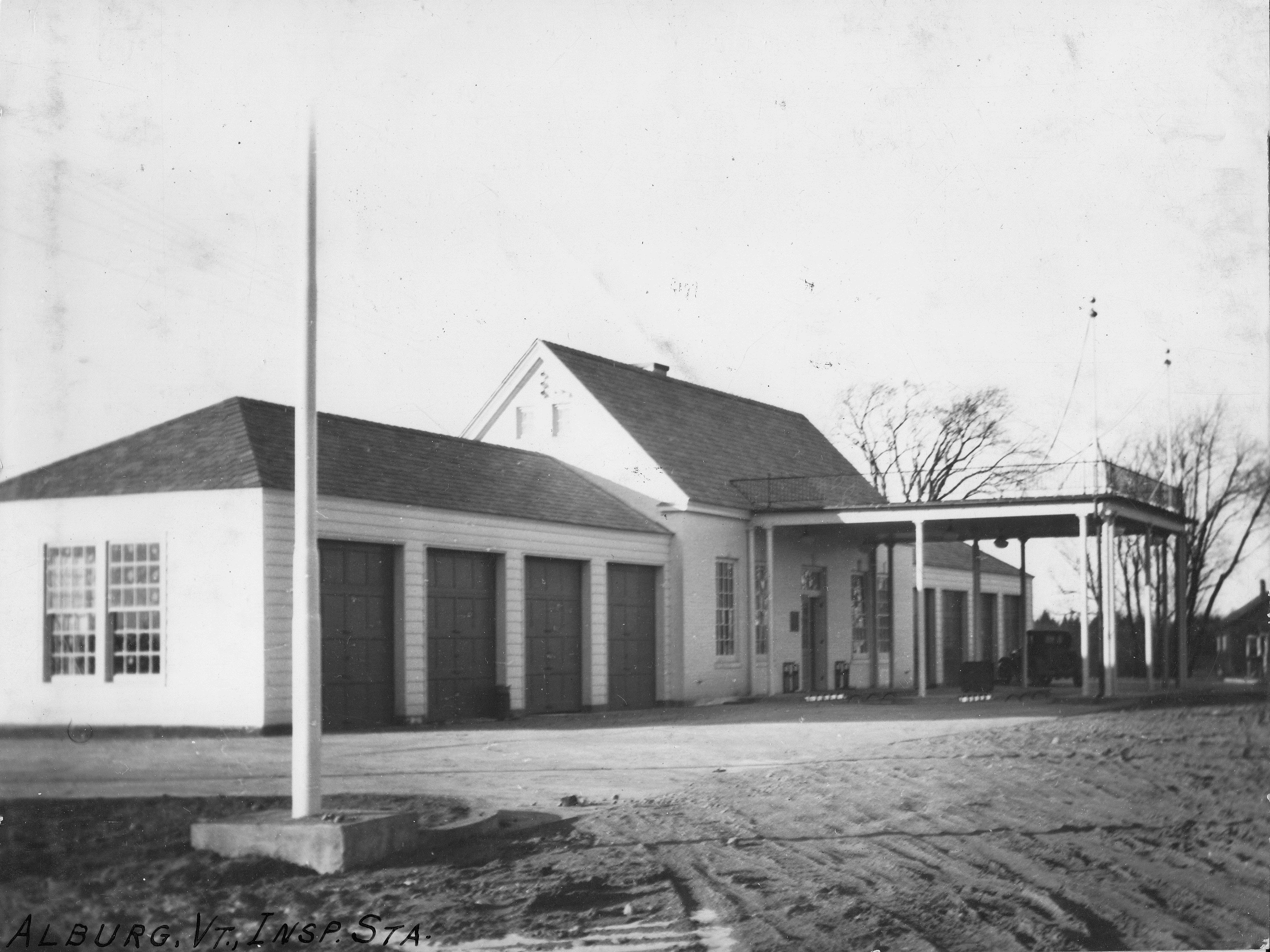
US border inspection station at Alburgh, VT shortly after its construction in 1934

Prior to the construction of the joint border station, both the US and Canada had their own border stations at this location. These stations were responsible for collecting duty and performing inspections on vehicles crossing the border at several nearby north–south roads. Signs directed traffic to report for inspection.

== See also ==
- List of Canada–United States border crossings
