= Vermont Route 225 =

State highway in Grand Isle County, Vermont, US

Vermont Route 225
- Border Road
- VT 225 highlighted in red

Route information
- Maintained by the Town of Alburgh
- Length: 1.59 mi (2.56 km)
- Existed: By 1985–present

Major junctions
- South end: US 2 in Alburgh
- North end: R-225 at the Canadian border near Noyan, QC

Location
- Country: United States
- State: Vermont
- Counties: Grand Isle

Highway system
- State highways in Vermont
← VT 215	→ VT 232
← VT 67A	→ VT 73

Vermont Route 225 (VT 225) is a short 1.59-mile-long (2.56 km) state highway in Grand Isle County, Vermont, United States. It runs from U.S. Route 2 (US 2) north of Alburgh and runs due north to the Canadian border, where it becomes Quebec Route 225, from which it derives its number. The route is entirely within Alburgh in Grand Isle County. The entirety of VT 225 is maintained by the town of Alburgh.

Route 225 most practically serves as part of a connection between Vermont and the city of Saint-Jean-sur-Richelieu in Quebec, located about 31 mi (50 km) southeast of Montreal, Quebec. Quebec Route 225 ends in Sainte-Anne-de-Sabrevois, roughly eight miles (13 km) from Saint-Jean-sur-Richelieu.

== Route description ==
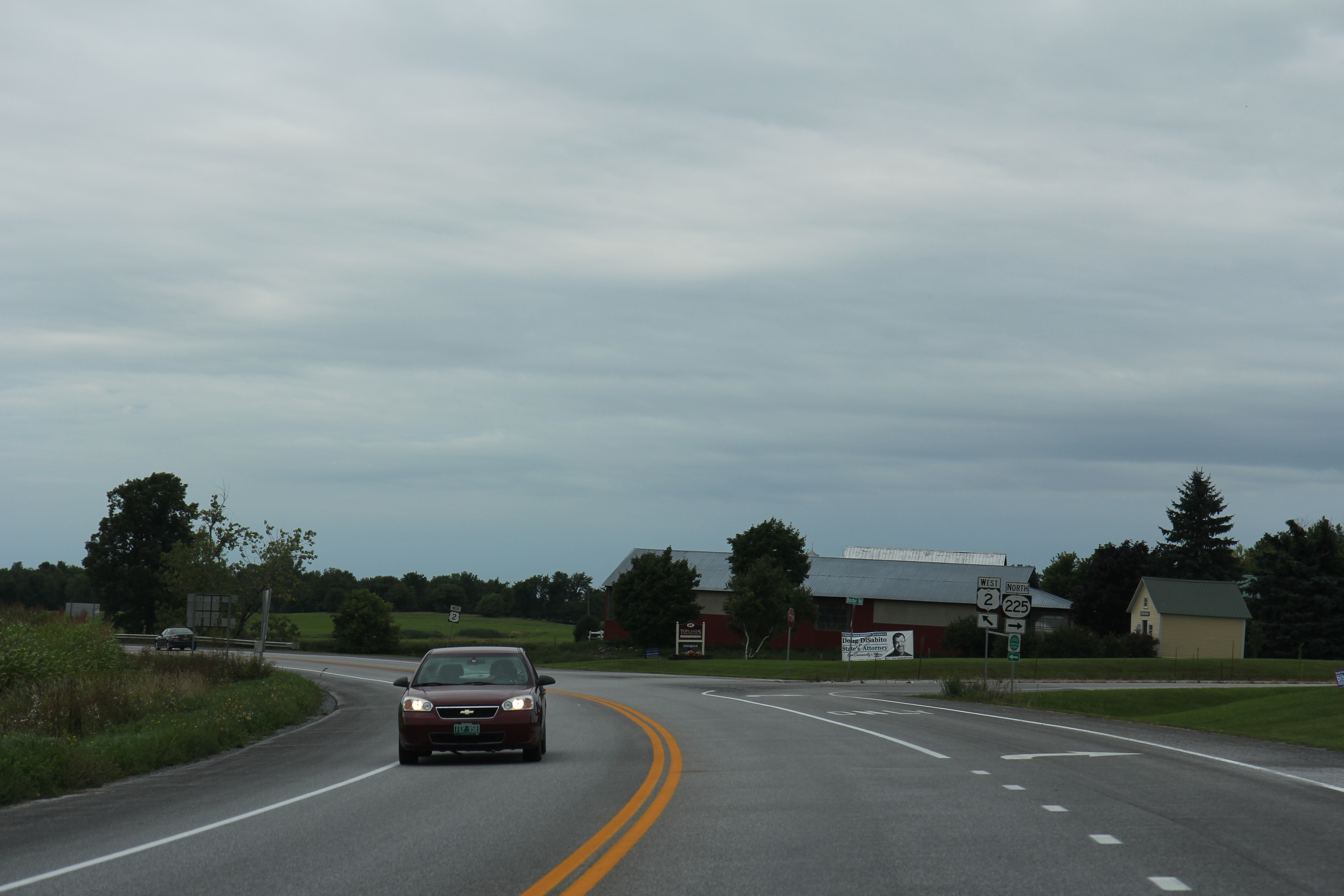
The southern terminus of Vermont Route 225 diverging from US Route 2.

VT 225 is essentially a northern spur of US 2, which approaches running northward through the town of Alburgh. US 2 turns westward towards its final approach to New York, and VT 225 begins to the north. The route only intersects two through roads: a short former alignment of US 2 literally mere yards long, and Blair Road, a secondary road which parallels VT 225 northward to the border. Both of these intersections occur within a quarter mile of VT 225's southern terminus. VT 225, appropriately named Border Road, runs almost directly north to the Canadian border at the Alburgh–Noyan Border Crossing, only passing a few isolated homes along the way. Upon crossing the border into Quebec, the road becomes Quebec Route 225.

== History ==
The length of VT 225 was designated as part of VT 104, a highway extending from VT 15 in Cambridge north to the Canadian border near Alburgh, by 1938. VT 104 was truncated on its northern end to St. Albans in the mid-to-late 1950s, at which time the former routing of VT 104 between Alburgh and the border was re-designated VT 68. It was renumbered to VT 225 between 1976 and 1985 to match the designation of the highway it connected to (Quebec Route 225) in Quebec.

== Major intersections ==
The entire route is in Alburgh, Grand Isle County.

mi	km	Destinations	Notes
0.00	0.00	US 2 – St. Albans, Burlington, Rouses Point NY	Southern terminus
1.59	2.56	R-225 north – Noyan	Continuation into Quebec
1.000 mi = 1.609 km; 1.000 km = 0.621 mi
