= Saint-Valentin, Quebec =

Saint-Valentin
- Municipality
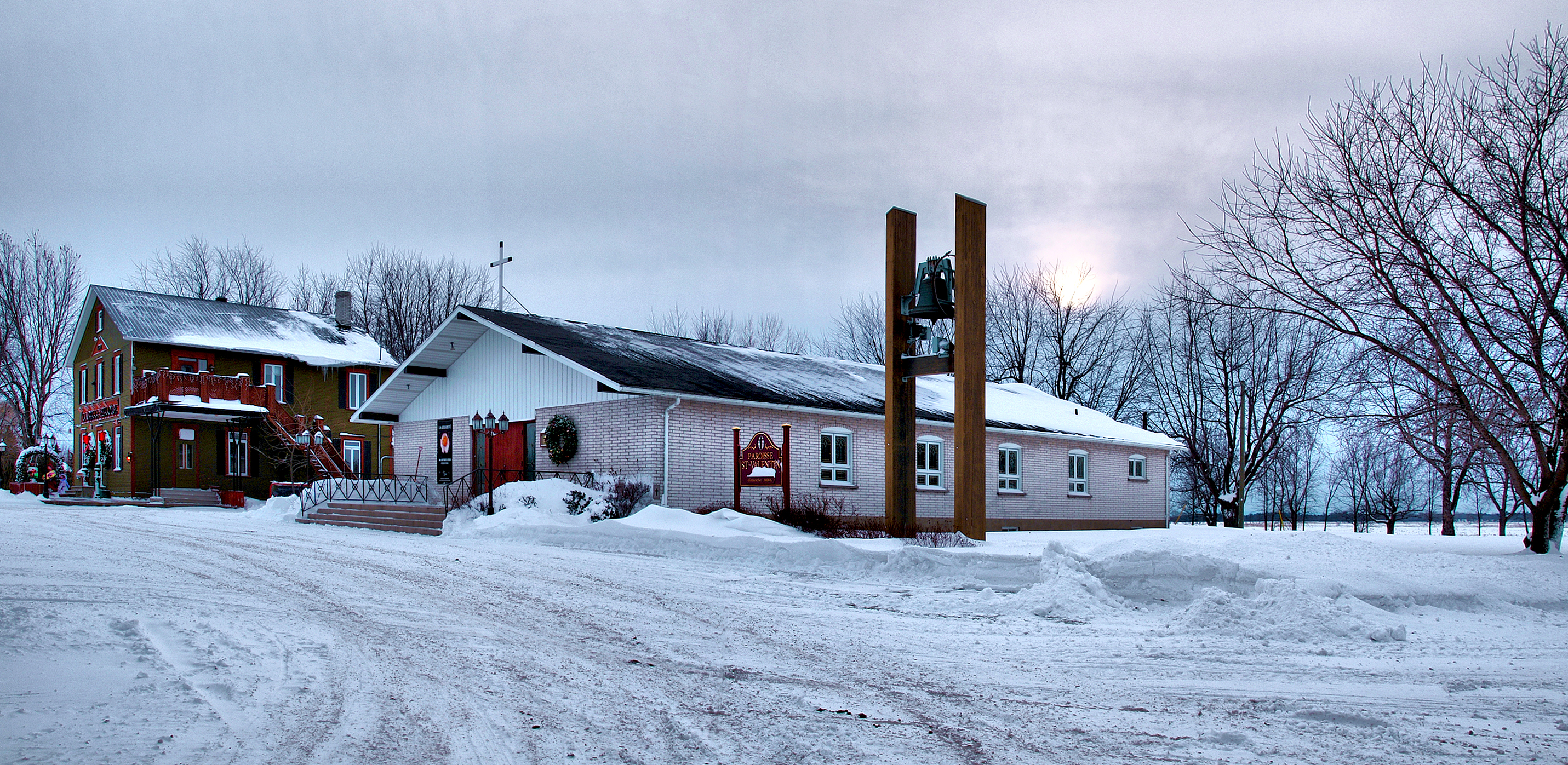

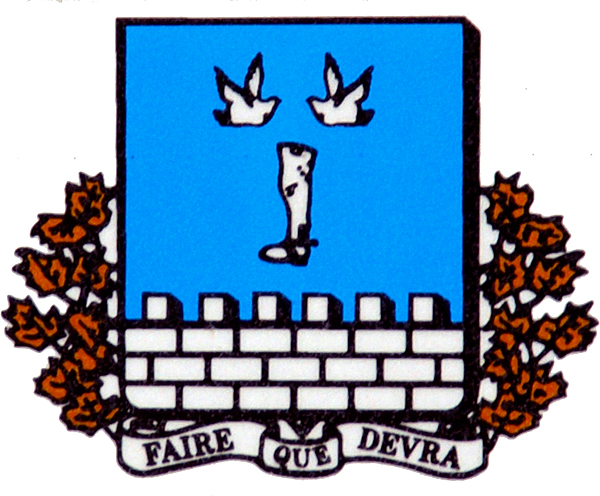
- Coat of arms
- Motto: Faire que devra
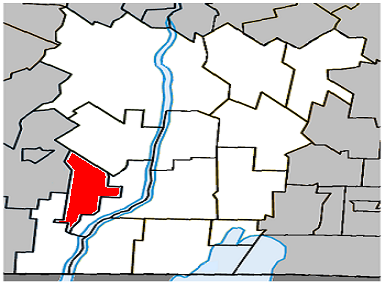
- Location within Le Haut-Richelieu RCM

- Location in southern Quebec
- Coordinates: 45°08′N 73°19′W
- Country: Canada
- Province: Quebec
- Region: Montérégie
- RCM: Le Haut-Richelieu
- Constituted: July 1, 1855

Government
  - Mayor: Pierre Chamberland
  - Federal riding: Saint-Jean
  - Prov. riding: Huntingdon

Area
  - Total: 39.50 km^{2} (15.25 sq mi)
  - Land: 39.56 km^{2} (15.27 sq mi)
- There is an apparent contradiction between two authoritative sources

Population (2011)
  - Total: 470
  - Density: 11.9/km^{2} (31/sq mi)
  - Pop 2006-2011: ▼1.7%
  - Dwellings: 173
- Time zone: UTC−5 (EST)
  - Summer (DST): UTC−4 (EDT)
- Postal code(s): J0J 2E0
- Area codes: 450 and 579
- Highways: R-202
- Website: www.municipalite. saint-valentin.qc.ca

Saint-Valentin (French pronunciation: [sɛ̃ valɑ̃tɛ̃]) is a municipality in southern Quebec, Canada located in the administrative area of the Montérégie. The population as of the Canada 2011 Census was 470.

Named after the Christian hallow Saint Valentine, the community has been trying to capitalize on its name as a destination for lovers since the 1990s. A Festival de la Saint-Valentin is held every February, along with a St. Valentine's Day Mass. The post office frequently receives letters from around the world to postmark.

== Municipal Council ==
- Gaétan Fortin Position - 1 (Watercourses and ditches Public works, buildings and roads)
- Nicole Lussier Position - 2 (Cycle network, Vernissage, Culture Marriage and Civil Union, Environment)
- Michelle Richer Position 3 (Leisure, Link between the Optimist club and the Municipality)
- Paolo Girard Position 4 (Justice and enforcement of regulations, Public works, buildings and roads Fire and first responder Emergency measures, Vice-president and secretary-treasurer of the Festival)
- Van Velzen Position 5 (Library, Twinning, Emergency measures, Urban Planning Advisory Committee)
- Pierre Vallières Position 6 (Justice and application of regulations Family and Seniors Fire and first responder (Substitute), Festival President) Council meetings mainly take place on the first Tuesday of the month at 8 p.m. in the council room.

== Demographics ==
=== Population ===
Canada census – Saint-Valentin community profile

	2021	2011
Population	418 (-6.5% from 2016)	470 (-1.7% from 2006)
Land area	39.27 km^{2} (15.16 sq mi)	39.56 km^{2} (15.27 sq mi)
Population density	10.6/km^{2} (27/sq mi)	11.9/km^{2} (31/sq mi)
Median age	43.6 (M: 44.8, F: 42.4)	39.3 (M: 42.8, F: 34.5)
Private dwellings	160 (total)	173 (total)
Median household income		$58,180

References: 2021 2011

Historical Census Data - Saint-Valentin, Quebec

Year	Pop.	±%
1991	510	—
1996	490	−3.9%

Year	Pop.	±%
2001	479	−2.2%
2006	478	−0.2%

Year	Pop.	±%
2011	470	−1.7%

=== Language ===
Canada Census Mother Tongue - Saint-Valentin, Quebec
Census	Total	French			English			French & English			Other		
Year	Responses	Count	Trend	Pop %	Count	Trend	Pop %	Count	Trend	Pop %	Count	Trend	Pop %
2011	460	425	▼11.5%	92.39%	10	0.0%	2.17%	5	▼50.0%	1.09%	20	▲100.0%	4.35%
2006	510	480	▲9.1%	94.12%	10	▼60.0%	1.96%	10	▲ n/a%	1.96%	10	▼33.3%	1.96%
2001	480	440	▲1.1%	91.67%	25	▲ n/a%	5.21%	0	▼100.0%	0.00%	15	▼70.0%	3.12%
1996	495	435	n/a	87.88%	0	n/a	0.00%	10	n/a	2.02%	50	n/a	10.10%

== Education ==
The South Shore Protestant Regional School Board previously served the municipality.

== See also ==
- List of municipalities in Quebec
