= Pont de Des Rivières =

Remarkable covered bridge in Notre-Dame-de-Stanbridge, Québec, Canada

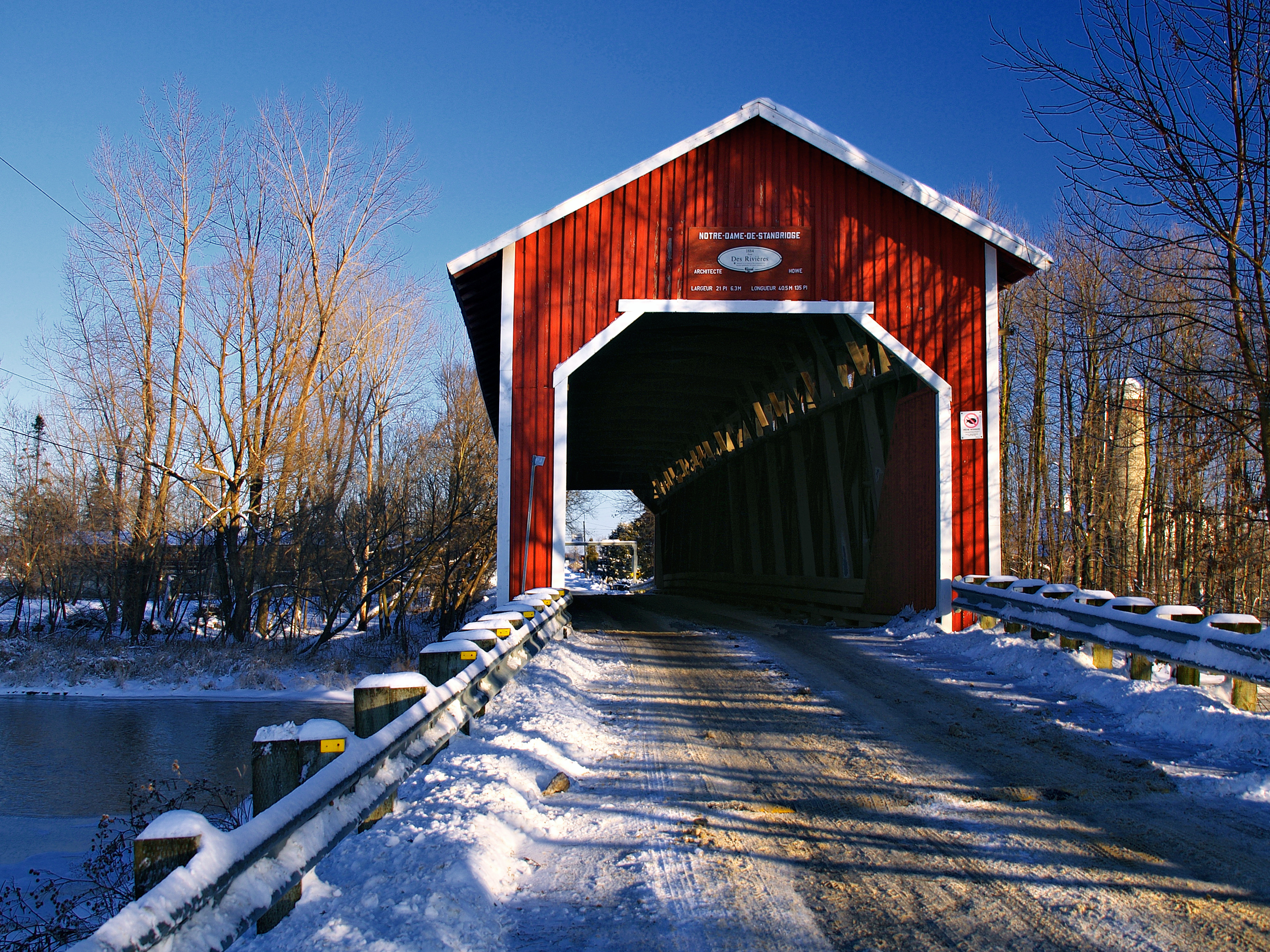
- Pont de Des Rivières
- Coordinates: 45°09′28″N 73°03′04″W
- Crosses: Rivière aux Brochets
- Locale: Notre-Dame-de-Stanbridge, Montérégie, Québec, Canada
- Heritage status: Heritage building (designation: Karl Wilhelm Berkhan, classified in 2015)

Characteristics
- Design: Covered bridge
- Material: Wood
- Total length: 41.5m
- Width: 6.3m
- Longest span: 37.4m

History
- Architect: Bachalder
- Constructed by: Jos. Reid et Fils
- Opened: 1884

The Pont de Des Rivières is a covered bridge spanning the Rivière aux Brochets in Notre-Dame-de-Stanbridge, Quebec, Canada, near the hamlet of Malmaison. It is the only authentic Howe-type truss bridge in Quebec. It is also remarkable for its stone abutments, vertical board, and batten siding.

Erected in 1884, it is the third bridge to be built on this site. It is contemporary with the development of the hamlet of Malmaison by brothers François-Guillaume and Henri Desrivières, who built a dam, flour mill, and sawmill here in the 1840s. At its peak, the hamlet had a population of around 200, as well as a chapel and a school. The site was slowly abandoned at the end of the 19th century. The bridge was raised in 1912 to prevent it being washed away. It was restored in 1998.

The Ministry of Culture and Communications of Québec classified the structure as a heritage building in 2015 as the only surviving example of a Howe farm bridge in Quebec and as an example of a bridge built in Quebec before the development of the typical Ministère de la Colonisation covered bridge model.

== Toponymy ==
The bridge owes its name to brothers François-Guillaume and Henri Desrivières. Settling in Stanbridge Township in 1830, the two men contributed to the area's economic and demographic growth by building a sawmill and flour mill on the Rivière aux Brochets.

== Features ==
The Des Rivières Bridge is located on Chemin Saint-Charles, 3 km southwest of the village of Notre-Dame-de-Stanbridge. It crosses the Rivière aux Brochets.

The bridge has a total length of 41.5m and a width of 6.3m. It has a single span of 37.4 m. Access is limited to vehicles less than 2.7 m high and weighing 5 tonnes or less.

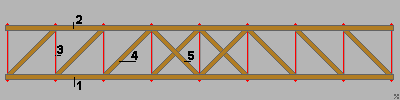
Howe-type truss beam.

The Rivières Bridge is the only bridge in Quebec to feature a Howe truss. This truss is composed of interlocking beams whose punches have been replaced by steel tie rods. The tie rods are fitted with tensioners for periodic adjustment. This was the first truss to combine metal and wood. The wooden truss was patented by William Howe in 1840. It quickly won favor with railroad companies for its simplicity of construction and ease of maintenance. It remained the standard for North American railroads until the advent of metal bridges in the early 20th century. Only about twenty road bridges using this truss were ever built, including the Des Rivières Bridge. Another bridge using this truss, the Monaghan Bridge in Stanbridge East, was demolished and rebuilt at the Village Québécois d'Antan in Drummondville.

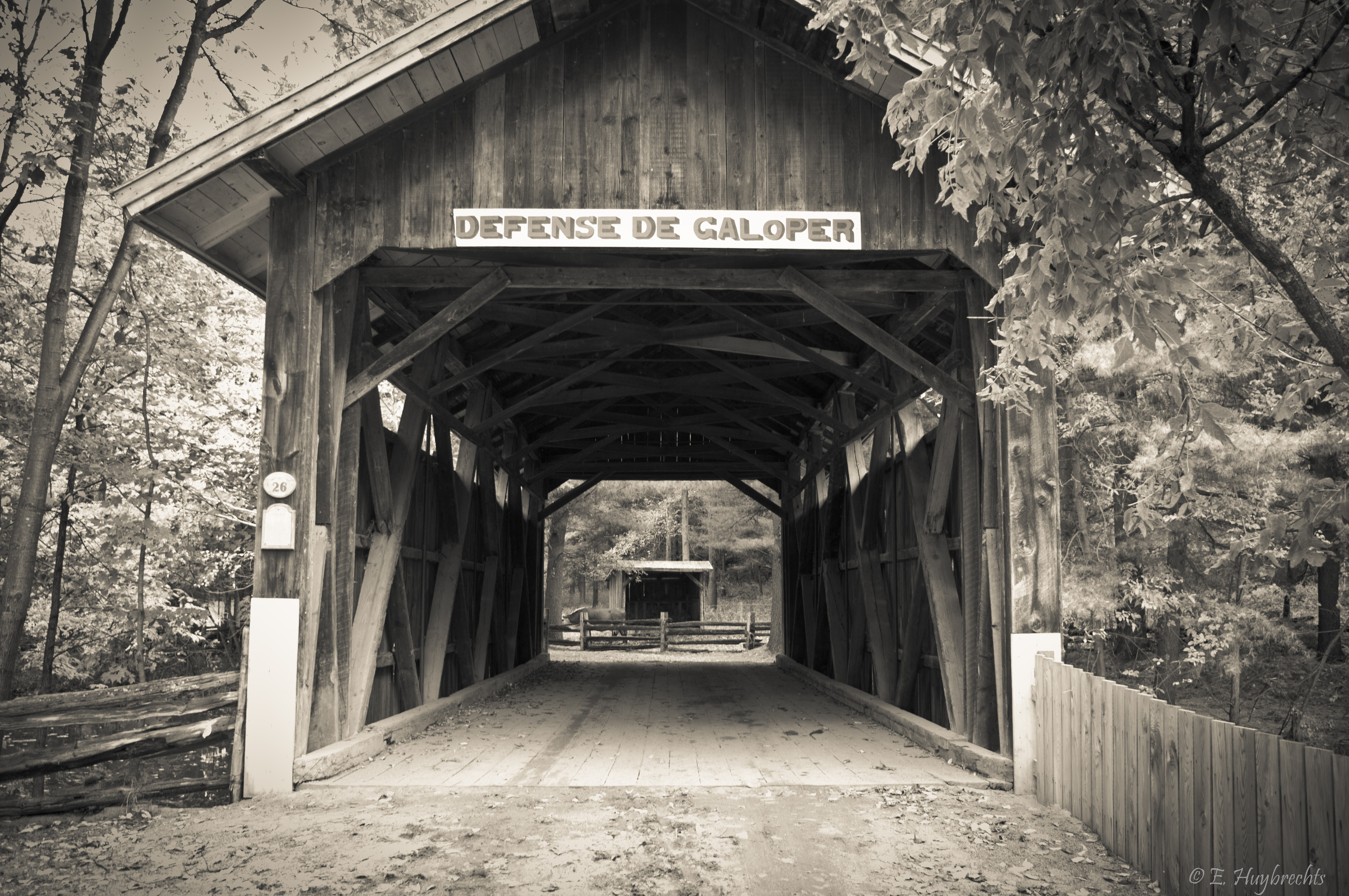
Monaghan Bridge at Village Québécois d'Antan

The bridge's roof has two corrugated metal slopes. The cladding, which protects the structure from the elements, consists of vertical boards with red-painted joint caps, a rare feature among Quebec-covered bridges. Side openings run along the runners. The porticos are decorated with white-painted lintels with oblique angles and straight jambs. The deck is clad with longitudinal planks. The bridge still rests on its original squared-stone abutments, which have been replaced by concrete abutments on many older bridges.

== History ==
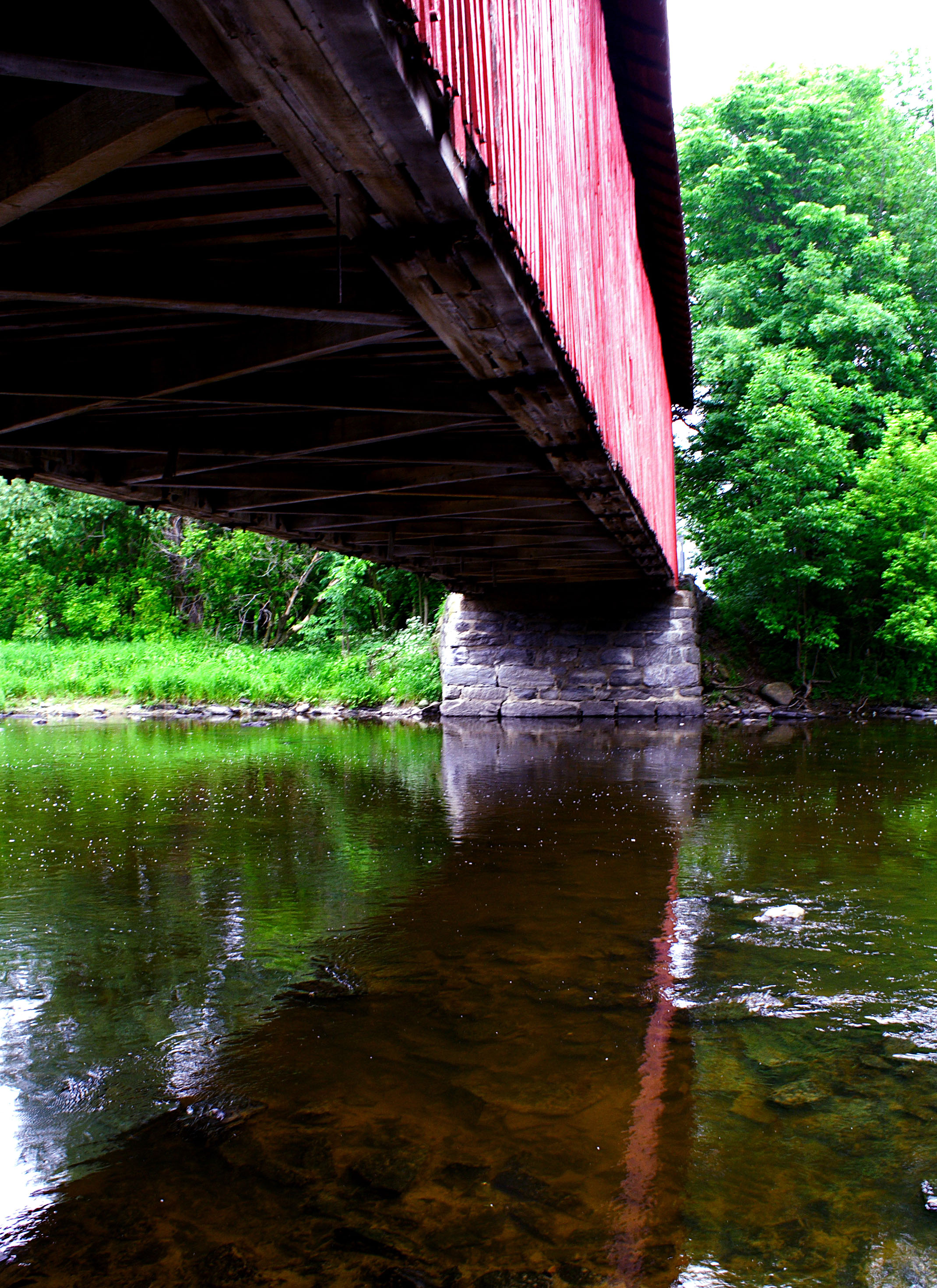
Under the bridge with one of the stone abutments.

Stanbridge Township was proclaimed in 1801. The land passed through several hands before being acquired by brothers François-Guillaume and Henri Desrivières in 1830. They were the first landowners to settle in the area. In 1841, they built a house at the western end of their land, near the Rivière aux Brochets. They named their property “Malmaison”, after the estate of Joséphine de Beauharnais (1763-1814), Napoleon Bonaparte's first wife. In 1842, they had a dam built across the river, as well as a sawmill on the west bank and a flour mill on the opposite bank. The first covered bridge was built over the river in 1843.

The hamlet of Malmaison grew rapidly, reaching a population of 200. In addition to the mills, a chapel, and a school were built in the community. Between 1863 and 1865, the first bridge was swept away by the ice flow. It was rebuilt in 1865. It was washed away again in the spring of 1883.

The present bridge was built in 1884 to plans by Bedford architect Bachalder. It was built with timber from the mill owned by James Crother, mayor of Notre-Dame-des-Anges-de-Stanbridge, by contractors Jos Reid et fils of Bedford. Malmaison was slowly abandoned at the end of the 19th century, and its territory was included in that of Notre-Dame-de-Stanbridge in 1889. The bridge remains one of the last vestiges of the historic hamlet.

In 1912, a flood threatened to sweep away the bridge. To solve the problem, the municipality hired the contractor Trahan et frères to raise the deck 60 cm. The bridge retains most of its original features. However, the arched porticos were replaced by lintelled porticos with oblique angles in the late 1950s. The bridge floor, originally diagonal, now runs parallel to the road.

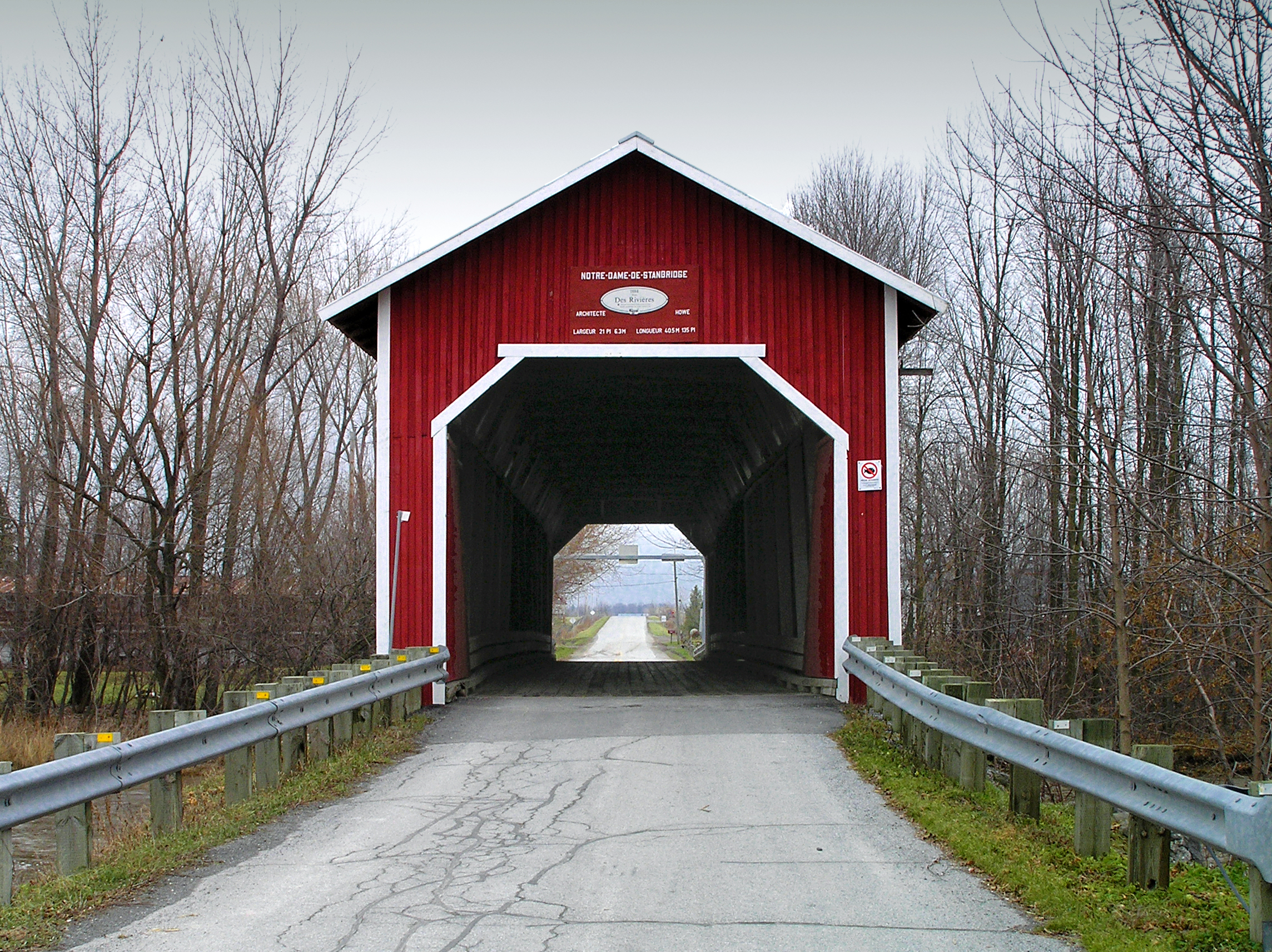
Front view of the bridge.

In 1998, the bridge was restored, including the abutments, roof and decking. A six-space parking lot was built next to the bridge in 2011, and a park in 2012. A non-profit organization, Héritage stanbridgeois, decided to enhance the Malmaison site and its structures, which also include the Malmaison manor house, the Malmaison school, the Des Rivières mill, and the cemetery. The site was inaugurated in spring 2014. Héritage stanbridgeois has also proposed that the Ministry classify the bridge, with the support of several municipalities and associations in the area.

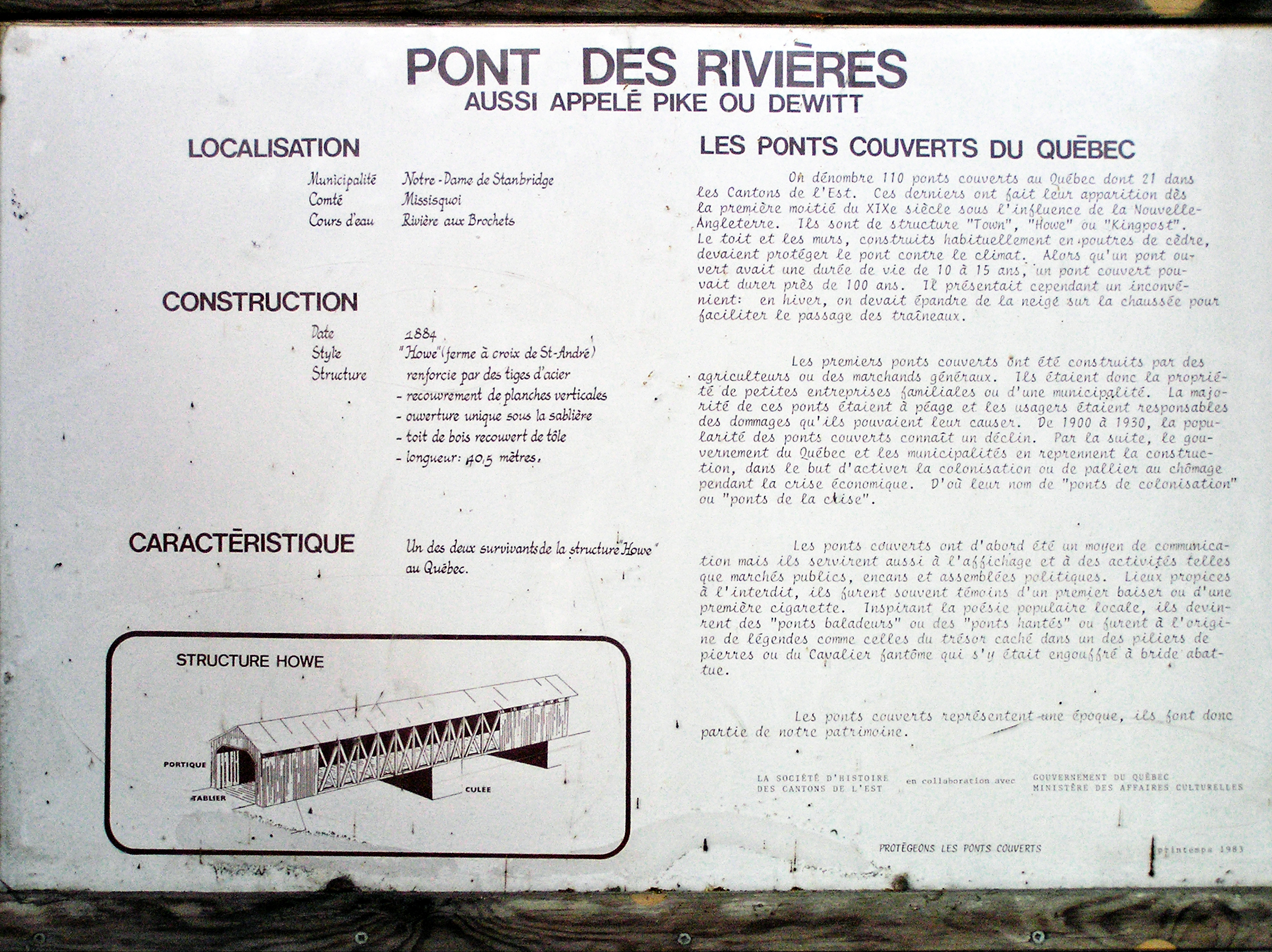
Covered bridge information plaque fixed to the bridge.

The structure was classified as a heritage building on October 22, 2015, by the Ministry of Culture and Communications du Québec. It owes its recognition to the fact that it is the only surviving authentic example of the Howe farmhouse in Quebec. Its presence is also a reminder of the region's settlement history, linked to the importance of the timber trade and agriculture. Its age also reveals several features that differ from the model proposed by the Ministère de la Colonisation at the beginning of the 20th century, such as its vertical plank siding, its opening at the eaves, and its squared stone abutments. It is still used for vehicular traffic.

The municipality of Notre-Dame-de-Stanbridge has a covered bridge on its coat of arms.

== See also ==
- List of covered bridges in Quebec
