= Clarenceville, Quebec =

Clarenceville
- Municipality
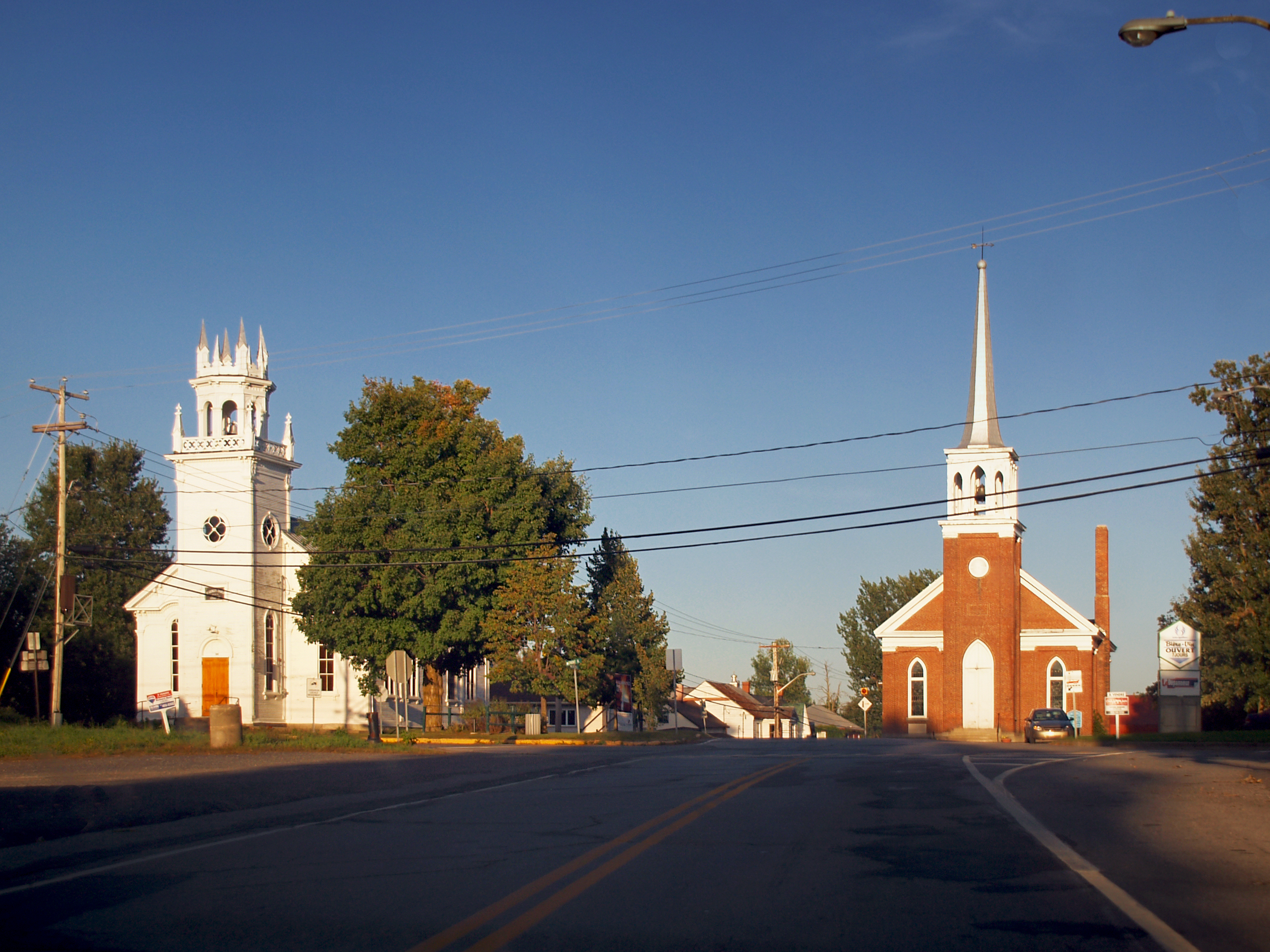
- West entrance of Clarenceville

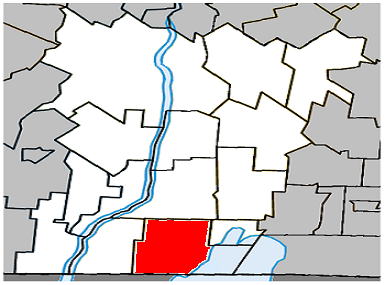
- Location within Le Haut-Richelieu RCM

- Location in southern Quebec
- Coordinates: 45°04′N 73°15′W
- Country: Canada
- Province: Quebec
- Region: Montérégie
- RCM: Le Haut-Richelieu
- Constituted: December 27, 1989

Government
  - Mayor: Serge Beaudoin
  - Federal riding: Brome—Missisquoi
  - Prov. riding: Iberville

Area
  - Total: 81.70 km^{2} (31.54 sq mi)
  - Land: 63.06 km^{2} (24.35 sq mi)

Population (2021)
  - Total: 1,154
  - Density: 18.3/km^{2} (47/sq mi)
  - Pop 2016-2021: ▲4.6%
  - Dwellings: 732
- Time zone: UTC−5 (EST)
  - Summer (DST): UTC−4 (EDT)
- Postal code(s): J0J 1B0
- Area codes: 450 and 579
- Highways: R-202
- Website: www.clarenceville.qc.ca

Clarenceville (French pronunciation: [klaʁɑ̃svil]; formerly Saint-Georges-de-Clarenceville [sɛ̃ ʒɔʁʒ də klaʁɑ̃svil]) is a municipality in the province of Quebec, Canada, located in the Regional County Municipality of Le Haut-Richelieu. The population as of the Canada 2021 Census was 1,154. The name Clarenceville was adopted to mark the visit to Canada in 1787 by Prince William, Duke of Clarence and St Andrews, who became King in 1830 as William IV. Some parts of the municipality have no drinking water system or sewers.

== History ==
Originally part of New France the area was named Seigneurie de Foucault and settled after 1727. The land was transferred to British rule after the Treaty of Paris was signed in 1783. The area was leased to Colonel Henry Caldwell in 1774 and called Caldwell's Manor, then sold in 1842 to Joseph Frederic Allard and renamed Allard's Manor. In 1822, the name was changed to Saint-Georges-de-Clarenceville, briefly Clarenceville, after William, the Duke of Clarence (1765–1837), third son of King George III, who later became William IV. The name was changed again in October 2022, to the Municipality of Clarenceville.

== Demographics ==
In the 2021 Census of Population conducted by Statistics Canada, Clarenceville had a population of 1,154 living in 538 of its 732 total private dwellings, a change of 4.6% from its 2016 population of 1,103. With a land area of 63.06 km^{2} (24.35 sq mi), it had a population density of 18.3/km^{2} (47.4/sq mi) in 2021.

=== Population ===
Canada census – Clarenceville community profile

	2021	2016	2011
Population	1,154 (+4.6% from 2016)	1,103 (+4.5% from 2011)	1,056 (-4.5% from 2006)
Land area	63.06 km^{2} (24.35 sq mi)	63.46 km^{2} (24.50 sq mi)	63.43 km^{2} (24.49 sq mi)
Population density	18.3/km^{2} (47/sq mi)	17.4/km^{2} (45/sq mi)	16.6/km^{2} (43/sq mi)
Median age	54.4 (M: 54.0, F: 56.0)	52.9 (M: 52.7, F: 53.2)	50.4 (M: 51.4, F: 49.4)
Private dwellings	732 (total) 538 (occupied)	738 (total)	718 (total)
Median household income	$65,000	$49,792	$42,177

References: 2021 2016 2011

Historical Census Data - Clarenceville, Quebec

Year	Pop.	±%
1861	1,761	—
1871	1,250	−29.0%
1881	1,186	−5.1%
1891	1,138	−4.0%
1901	999	−12.2%
1911	908	−9.1%
1921	648	−28.6%
1931	598	−7.7%

Year	Pop.	±%
1941	651	+8.9%
1951	439	−32.6%
1956	377	−14.1%
1961	462	+22.5%
1966	456	−1.3%
1971	558	+22.4%
1976	501	−10.2%
1981	591	+18.0%

Year	Pop.	±%
1986	579	−2.0%
1991	918	+58.5%
1996	980	+6.8%
2001	1,073	+9.5%
2006	1,106	+3.1%
2011	1,056	−4.5%
2016	1,103	+4.5%
2021	1,154	+4.6%

=== Language ===
Canada Census Mother Tongue - Clarenceville, Quebec
Census	Total	French			English			French & English			Other		
Year	Responses	Count	Trend	Pop %	Count	Trend	Pop %	Count	Trend	Pop %	Count	Trend	Pop %
2021	1,155	805	▲8.1%	69.7%	260	▼7.1%	22.5%	25	▲150.0%	2.2%	50	▼23.1%	4.3%
2016	1,100	745	▲12.0%	67.7%	280	▼6.7%	25.5%	10	▼33.3%	0.9%	65	0.0%	5.9%
2011	1,045	665	▼15.8%	63.6%	300	▲33.3%	28.7%	15	▼50.0%	1.4%	65	▲8.3%	6.2%
2006	1,105	790	▲35.0%	71.5%	225	▼41.6%	20.4%	30	▲20.0%	2.7%	60	▼20.0%	5.4%
2001	1,070	585	▲41.0%	54.7%	385	▼13.5%	36.0%	25	0.0%	2.3%	75	▼16.7%	7.0%
1996	975	415	n/a	42.6%	445	n/a	45.6%	25	n/a	2.6%	90	n/a	9.2%

== Notable people ==
- Carrie Derick (1862 – 1941), noted botanist and geneticist, was the first woman full professor at a Canadian university. She was born in Clarenceville.

== See also ==
- List of anglophone communities in Quebec
- List of municipalities in Quebec
- Royal eponyms in Canada
