= Notre-Dame-de-Stanbridge =

- Municipality
- Notre-Dame-de-Stanbridge in 2026

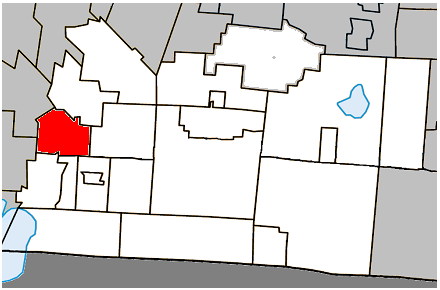
- Location within Brome-Missisquoi RCM

- Location in southern Quebec
- Coordinates: 45°10′N 73°02′W
- Country: Canada
- Province: Quebec
- Region: Estrie
- RCM: Brome-Missisquoi
- Constituted: March 21, 1889

Government
  - Mayor: Daniel Tétreault
  - Federal riding: Brome—Missisquoi
  - Prov. riding: Brome-Missisquoi

Area
  - Total: 44.10 km^{2} (17.03 sq mi)
  - Land: 43.94 km^{2} (16.97 sq mi)

Population (2011)
  - Total: 660
  - Density: 15/km^{2} (39/sq mi)
  - Pop 2006-2011: ▼9.3%
  - Dwellings: 284
- Time zone: UTC−5 (EST)
  - Summer (DST): UTC−4 (EDT)
- Postal code(s): J0J 1M0
- Area codes: 450 and 579
- Highways: No major routes
- Website: www.notredame destanbridge.qc.ca

Notre-Dame-de-Stanbridge is a municipality in the Canadian province of Quebec, located within the Brome-Missisquoi Regional County Municipality. The population as of the Canada 2011 Census was 660.

== Demographics ==
=== Population ===
Population trend:

Census	Population	Change (%)
2011	660	▼9.3%
2006	728	▲2.2%
2001	712	▼12.5%
1996	814	▲0.7%
1991	808	N/A

=== Language ===
Mother tongue language (2006)

Language	Population	Pct (%)
French only	505	73.72%
English only	150	21.90%
Both English and French	0	0.00%
Other languages	30	4.38%

== See also ==
- List of municipalities in Quebec
- Pont de Des Rivières
