= Saint-Paul-de-l'Île-aux-Noix =

- Municipality
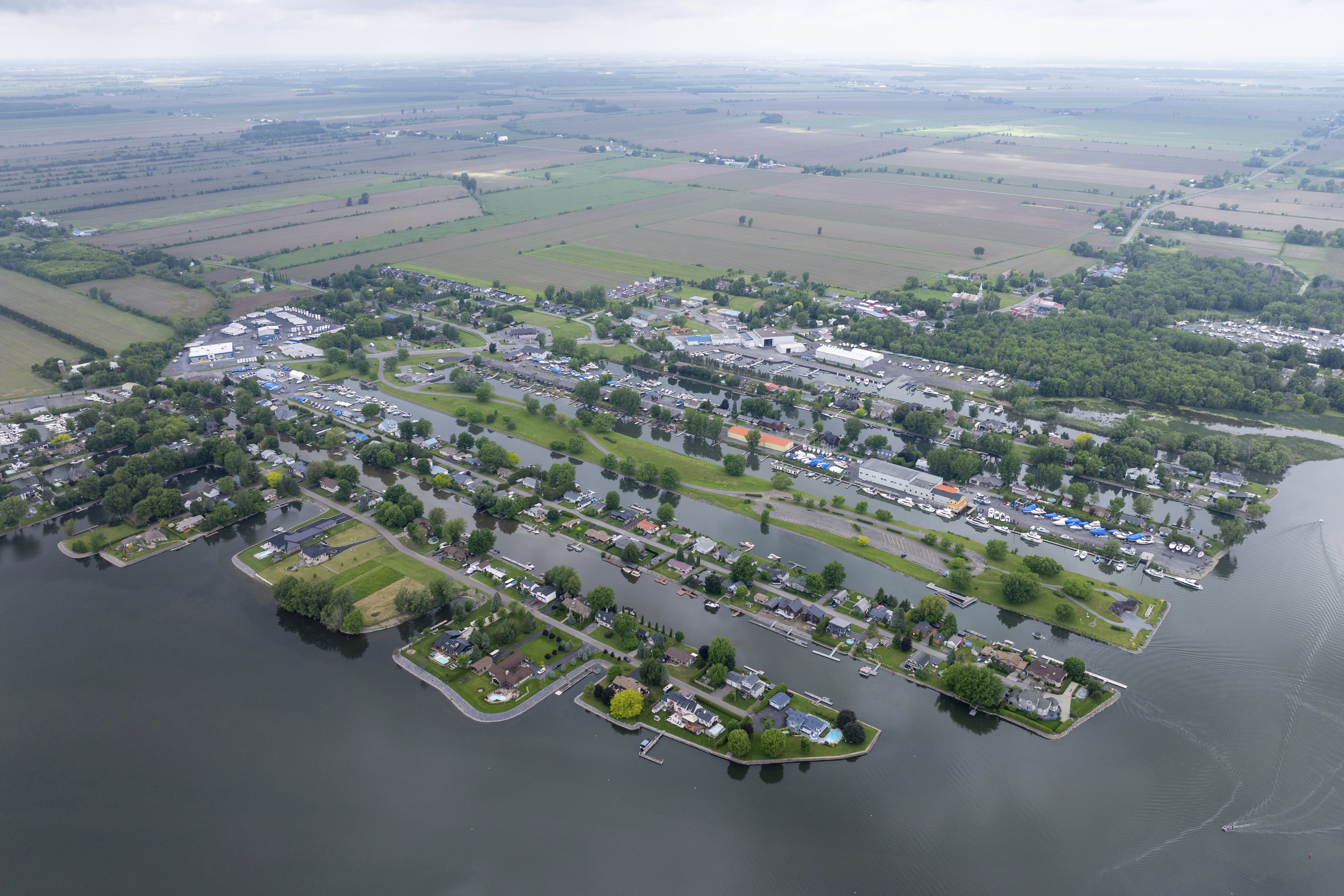
- Saint-Paul-de-l'Île-aux-Noix in 2026

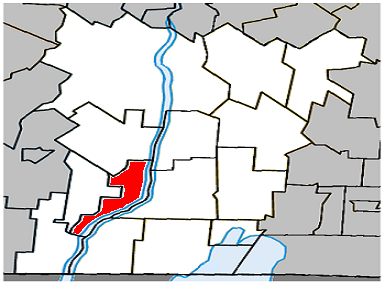
- Location within Le Haut-Richelieu RCM

- Location within southern Quebec
- Coordinates: 45°08′N 73°17′W
- Country: Canada
- Province: Quebec
- Region: Montérégie
- RCM: Le Haut-Richelieu
- Constituted: November 18, 1898

Government
  - Mayor: Jacques Desmarais
  - Federal riding: Saint-Jean
  - Prov. riding: Huntingdon

Area
  - Total: 37.40 km^{2} (14.44 sq mi)
  - Land: 29.85 km^{2} (11.53 sq mi)

Population (2021)
  - Total: 2,141
  - Density: 71.7/km^{2} (186/sq mi)
  - Pop 2016-2021: ▲8.1%
  - Dwellings: 1,112
- Time zone: UTC−5 (EST)
  - Summer (DST): UTC−4 (EDT)
- Postal code(s): J0J 1G0
- Area codes: 450 and 579
- Highways: R-202; R-223
- Website: www.ileauxnoix.com

Saint-Paul-de-l'Île-aux-Noix (French pronunciation: [sɛ̃ pɔl də lil o nwa]) is a municipality in southern Quebec, Canada located in the administrative area of the Montérégie. The population as of the Canada 2021 Census was 2,141.

The name of this municipality was chosen to pay tribute to Monsignor Paul Bruchési, who had just been consecrated Archbishop of the Diocese of Montreal in 1897. The name Île-aux-Noix has been well established for nearly two centuries. It refers to both a military establishment dating back to 1759 and a stretch of land opposite the municipality, and highlights the large number of walnut trees that once covered the island.

== Demographics ==
=== Population ===
Canada census – Saint-Paul-de-l'Île-aux-Noix community profile

	2021	2016	2011
Population	2,141 (+8.1% from 2016)	1,980 (+5.5% from 2011)	1,877 (-6.0% from 2006)
Land area	29.85 km^{2} (11.53 sq mi)	29.66 km^{2} (11.45 sq mi)	29.60 km^{2} (11.43 sq mi)
Population density	71.7/km^{2} (186/sq mi)	66.8/km^{2} (173/sq mi)	63.4/km^{2} (164/sq mi)
Median age	49.6 (M: 50, F: 48.4)	48.1 (M: 48.6, F: 47.6)	47.4 (M: 47.5, F: 47.3)
Private dwellings	965 (total)	1,020 (total)	1,043 (total)
Median household income	$73,500	$56,320	$53,529

References: 2021 2016 2011

Historical Census Data - Saint-Paul-de-l'Île-aux-Noix, Quebec

Year	Pop.	±%
1901	614	—
1911	531	−13.5%
1921	495	−6.8%
1931	534	+7.9%
1941	496	−7.1%
1951	558	+12.5%
1956	650	+16.5%

Year	Pop.	±%
1961	681	+4.8%
1966	816	+19.8%
1971	954	+16.9%
1976	1,095	+14.8%
1981	1,387	+26.7%
1986	1,577	+13.7%
1991	1,767	+12.0%

Year	Pop.	±%
1996	1,847	+4.5%
2001	1,935	+4.8%
2006	1,996	+3.2%
2011	1,877	−6.0%
2016	1,980	+5.5%
2021	2,141	+8.1%

=== Language ===
Canada Census Mother Tongue - Saint-Paul-de-l'Île-aux-Noix, Quebec
Census	Total	French			English			French & English			Other		
Year	Responses	Count	Trend	Pop %	Count	Trend	Pop %	Count	Trend	Pop %	Count	Trend	Pop %
2021	2,140	1,955	▲7.7%	91.4%	105	0.0%	4.9%	40	▲60.0%	1.9%	40	▲60.0%	1.9%
2016	1,980	1,815	▲5.5%	91.7%	105	▼4.5%	5.3%	25	▲66.7%	1.3%	25	▼16.7%	1.3%
2011	1,875	1,720	▼8.7%	91.7%	110	▲37.5%	5.9%	15	▼25.0%	0.8%	30	▲200.0%	1.6%
2006	1,995	1,885	▲10.6%	94.5%	80	▼54.3%	4.0%	20	▲33.3%	1.0%	10	▼75.0%	0.5%
2001	1,935	1,705	▲2.1%	88.1%	175	▲34.6%	9.0%	15	▼57.1%	0.8%	40	▲300.0%	2.1%
1996	1,845	1,670	n/a	90.5%	130	n/a	7.1%	35	n/a	1.9%	10	n/a	0.5%

== Education ==
The South Shore Protestant Regional School Board previously served the municipality.

== See also ==
- Ile aux Noix
- List of municipalities in Quebec
