= Le Haut-Richelieu Regional County Municipality =

- Regional county municipality
- Location in province of Quebec.
- Coordinates: 45°12′N 73°14′W
- Country: Canada
- Province: Quebec
- Region: Montérégie
- Effective: January 1, 1982
- County seat: Saint-Jean-sur-Richelieu

Government
  - Type: Prefecture
  - Prefect: Éric Latour

Area
  - Total: 999.70 km^{2} (385.99 sq mi)
  - Land: 936.02 km^{2} (361.40 sq mi)

Population (2016)
  - Total: 117,443
  - Density: 125.5/km^{2} (325/sq mi)
  - Change 2011-2016: ▲2.7%
  - Dwellings: 52,461
- Time zone: UTC−5 (EST)
  - Summer (DST): UTC−4 (EDT)
- Area codes: 450 and 579
- Website: www.mrchr.qc.ca

Le-haut Richelieu is on the south border

Le Haut-Richelieu Regional County Municipality (French pronunciation: [lə o ʁiʃ(ə)ljø], lit. 'The Upper Richelieu') is a regional county municipality in the Montérégie region in southwestern Quebec, Canada. Its seat is in Saint-Jean-sur-Richelieu. It is named for the Richelieu River which runs south-north through it.

== Subdivisions ==
There are 14 subdivisions within the RCM:

Cities & Towns (1)

- Saint-Jean-sur-Richelieu

Municipalities (12)

- Clarenceville
- Henryville
- Lacolle
- Mont-Saint-Grégoire
- Noyan
- Saint-Alexandre
- Saint-Blaise-sur-Richelieu
- Saint-Paul-de-l'Île-aux-Noix
- Saint-Sébastien
- Saint-Valentin
- Sainte-Brigide-d'Iberville
- Venise-en-Québec

Parishes (1)

- Sainte-Anne-de-Sabrevois

== Demographics ==
=== Population ===
Canada census – Le Haut-Richelieu community profile

	2021	2016	2011
Population	121,277 (+3.3% from 2016)	117,443 (+2.7% from 2011)	114,344 (+5.0% from 2006)
Land area	934.85 km^{2} (360.95 sq mi)	936.02 km^{2} (361.40 sq mi)	936.26 km^{2} (361.49 sq mi)
Population density	129.7/km^{2} (336/sq mi)	125.5/km^{2} (325/sq mi)	122.1/km^{2} (316/sq mi)
Median age	44.0 (M: 42.8, F: 44.8)	43.1 (M: 42.1, F: 44.1)	41.6 (M: 40.7, F: 42.6)
Private dwellings	55,208 (total) 52,723 (occupied)	52,461 (total)	50,665 (total)
Median household income	$75,500	$61,778	$55,167

References: 2021 2016 2011

Historical Census Data - Le Haut-Richelieu Regional County Municipality, Quebec

Year	Pop.	±%
1991	92,889	—
1996	97,539	+5.0%

Year	Pop.	±%
2001	100,753	+3.3%
2006	108,892	+8.1%

Year	Pop.	±%
2011	114,344	+5.0%
2016	117,443	+2.7%

=== Language ===
Canada Census Mother Tongue - Le Haut-Richelieu Regional County Municipality, Quebec
Census	Total	French			English			French & English			Other		
Year	Responses	Count	Trend	Pop %	Count	Trend	Pop %	Count	Trend	Pop %	Count	Trend	Pop %
2016	116,150	108,675	▲2.3%	93.6%	3,645	▼5.9%	3.1%	1,005	▲2.6%	0.9%	2,825	▲32.6%	2.4%
2011	113,245	106,260	▲5.8%	93.83%	3,875	▲15.5%	3.42%	980	▲41.0%	0.87%	2,130	▼25.7%	1.88%
2006	107,390	100,475	▲7.8%	93.56%	3,355	▼10.5%	3.12%	695	▼4.8%	0.65%	2,865	▲44.7%	2.67%
2001	99,630	93,170	▲2.9%	93.52%	3,750	▲2.5%	3.76%	730	▼7.0%	0.73%	1,980	▲37.0%	1.99%
1996	96,475	90,585	n/a	93.89%	3,660	n/a	3.79%	785	n/a	0.81%	1,445	n/a	1.50%

== Transportation ==
=== Access Routes ===
Highways and numbered routes that run through the municipality, including external routes that start or finish at the county border:

- Autoroutes
  - A-35
- Principal Highways
  - R-104
  - R-133
- Secondary Highways
  - R-202
  - R-219
  - R-221
  - R-223
  - R-225
  - R-227
- External Routes
  - US 11
  - NY 276
  - VT 225

== See also ==
- List of regional county municipalities and equivalent territories in Quebec
