= Sainte-Brigide-d'Iberville =

- Municipality
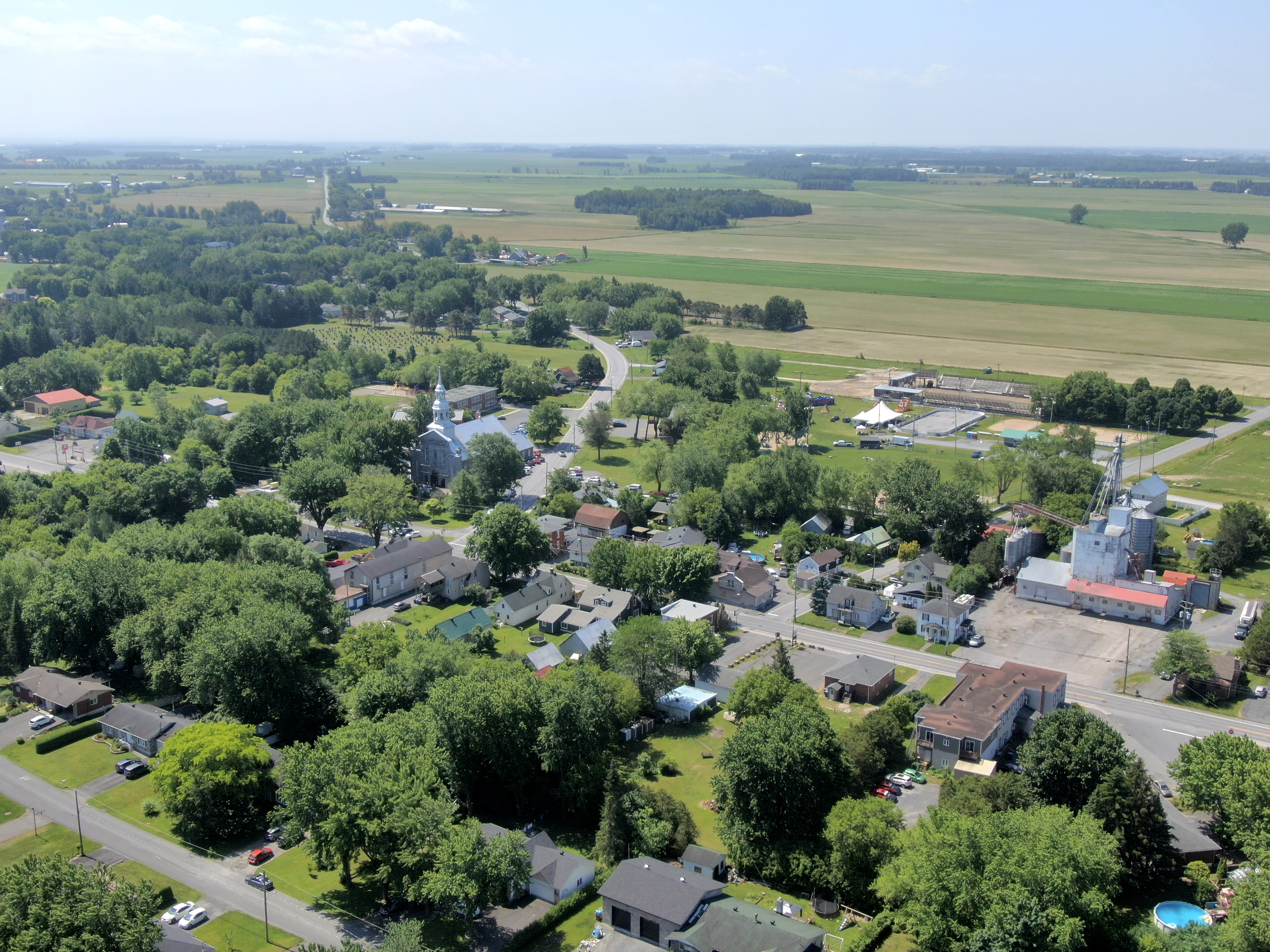
- Skyline of Sainte-Brigide-d'Iberville

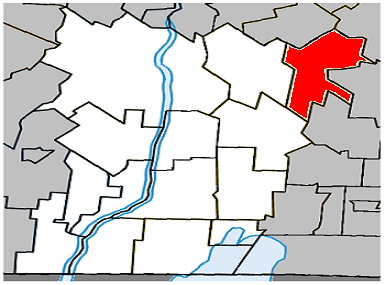
- Location within Le Haut-Richelieu RCM

- Location in southern Quebec
- Coordinates: 45°19′N 73°04′W
- Country: Canada
- Province: Quebec
- Region: Montérégie
- RCM: Le Haut-Richelieu
- Constituted: July 1, 1855

Government
  - Mayor: Patrick Bonvouloir
  - Federal riding: Saint-Jean
  - Prov. riding: Iberville

Area
  - Total: 70.90 km^{2} (27.37 sq mi)
  - Land: 71.28 km^{2} (27.52 sq mi)
- There is an apparent contradiction between two authoritative sources

Population (2011)
  - Total: 1,331
  - Density: 18.7/km^{2} (48/sq mi)
  - Pop 2006-2011: ▲8.8%
  - Dwellings: 522
- Time zone: UTC−5 (EST)
  - Summer (DST): UTC−4 (EDT)
- Postal code(s): J0J 1X0
- Area codes: 450 and 579
- Highways: R-104
- Website: www.sainte-brigide.qc.ca

Sainte-Brigide-d'Iberville (French pronunciation: [sɛ̃t bʁiʒid dibɛʁvil]) is a municipality in the province of Quebec, Canada, located in the Regional County Municipality of Le Haut-Richelieu. The population as of the Canada 2011 Census was 1,331.

== Demographics ==
=== Population ===
Canada census – Sainte-Brigide-d'Iberville community profile

	2021	2011
Population	1,428 (+1.9% from 2016)	1,331 (+8.8% from 2006)
Land area	70.52 km^{2} (27.23 sq mi)	71.28 km^{2} (27.52 sq mi)
Population density	20.3/km^{2} (53/sq mi)	18.7/km^{2} (48/sq mi)
Median age	38.8 (M: 38.8, F: 38.4)	37.0 (M: 36.8, F: 37.2)
Private dwellings	565 (total)	522 (total)
Median household income		$.N/A

Notes: 2011 income data for this area has been suppressed for data quality or confidentiality reasons.
References: 2021 2011

Historical Census Data - Sainte-Brigide-d'Iberville, Quebec

Year	Pop.	±%
1991	1,296	—
1996	1,371	+5.8%

Year	Pop.	±%
2001	1,279	−6.7%
2006	1,223	−4.4%

Year	Pop.	±%
2011	1,331	+8.8%

=== Language ===
Canada Census Mother Tongue - Sainte-Brigide-d'Iberville, Quebec
Census	Total	French			English			French & English			Other		
Year	Responses	Count	Trend	Pop %	Count	Trend	Pop %	Count	Trend	Pop %	Count	Trend	Pop %
2011	1,330	1,245	▲10.7%	93.61%	30	0.0%	2.26%	10	▲ n/a%	0.75%	45	▼40.0%	3.38%
2006	1,230	1,125	▼7.4%	91.46%	30	▲200.0%	2.44%	0	▼100.0%	0.00%	75	▲87.5%	6.10%
2001	1,275	1,215	▼8.6%	95.29%	10	▼60.0%	0.78%	10	▲ n/a%	0.78%	40	▲166.7%	3.14%
1996	1,370	1,330	n/a	97.08%	25	n/a	1.82%	0	n/a	0.00%	15	n/a	1.09%

== See also ==
- List of municipalities in Quebec
