= Saint-Césaire =

Saint Césaire
- Commune
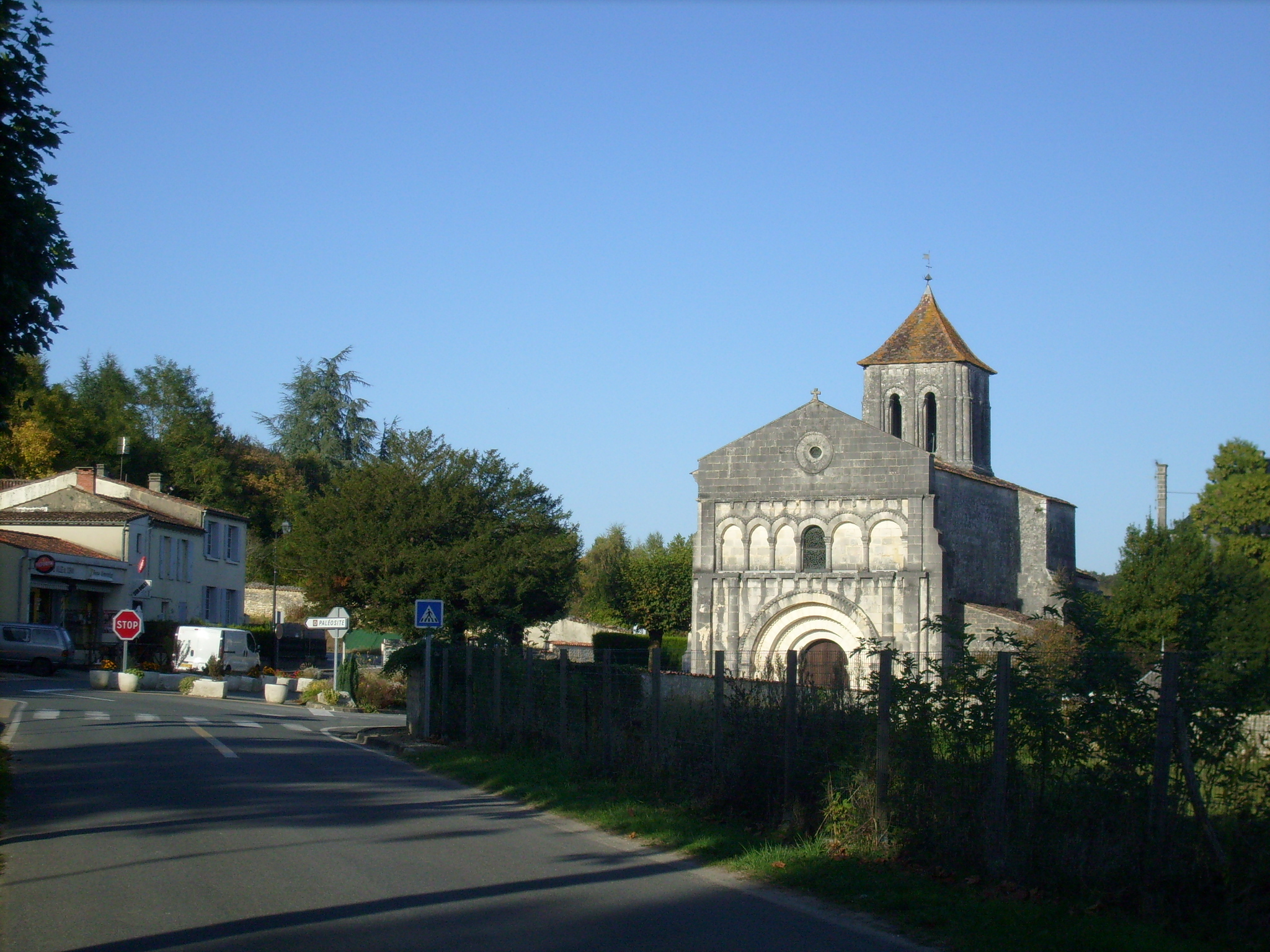
- The church in Saint-Césaire
- Location of Saint Césaire
- Location within France Location within Nouvelle-Aquitaine
- Coordinates: 45°45′11″N 0°30′22″W
- Country: France
- Region: Nouvelle-Aquitaine
- Department: Charente-Maritime
- Arrondissement: Saintes
- Canton: Chaniers
- Intercommunality: CA Saintes

Government
  - Mayor (2023–2026): Christelle Basso-Fin
- Area^{1}: 10.41 km^{2} (4.02 sq mi)
- Elevation: 30 m (98 ft)
- Highest elevation: 89 m (292 ft)
- Lowest elevation: 22 m (72 ft)
- Population (2023): 888
  - Density: 85.3/km^{2} (221/sq mi)
- Time zone: UTC+01:00 (CET)
  - Summer (DST): UTC+02:00 (CEST)
- INSEE/Postal code: 17314 /17770
- ^{1} French Land Register data, which excludes lakes, ponds, glaciers > 1 km^{2} (0.386 sq mi or 247 acres) and river estuaries.

Saint-Césaire (French pronunciation: [sɛ̃ sezɛʁ]) is a commune in the Charente-Maritime department, administrative region of Nouvelle-Aquitaine (before 2015: Poitou-Charentes), southwestern France. In the 1970s, a Neanderthal skeleton was found near Saint-Césaire.

== Population ==
Historical population
Year	Pop.	±% p.a.
1968	619	—
1975	717	+2.12%
1982	830	+2.11%
1990	858	+0.42%
1999	888	+0.38%
2007	915	+0.38%
2012	937	+0.48%
2017	875	−1.36%
2023	888	+0.25%
Source: INSEE

== See also ==
- Communes of the Charente-Maritime department
