= Quebec Route 225 =

Highway in Quebec, Canada

Route 225

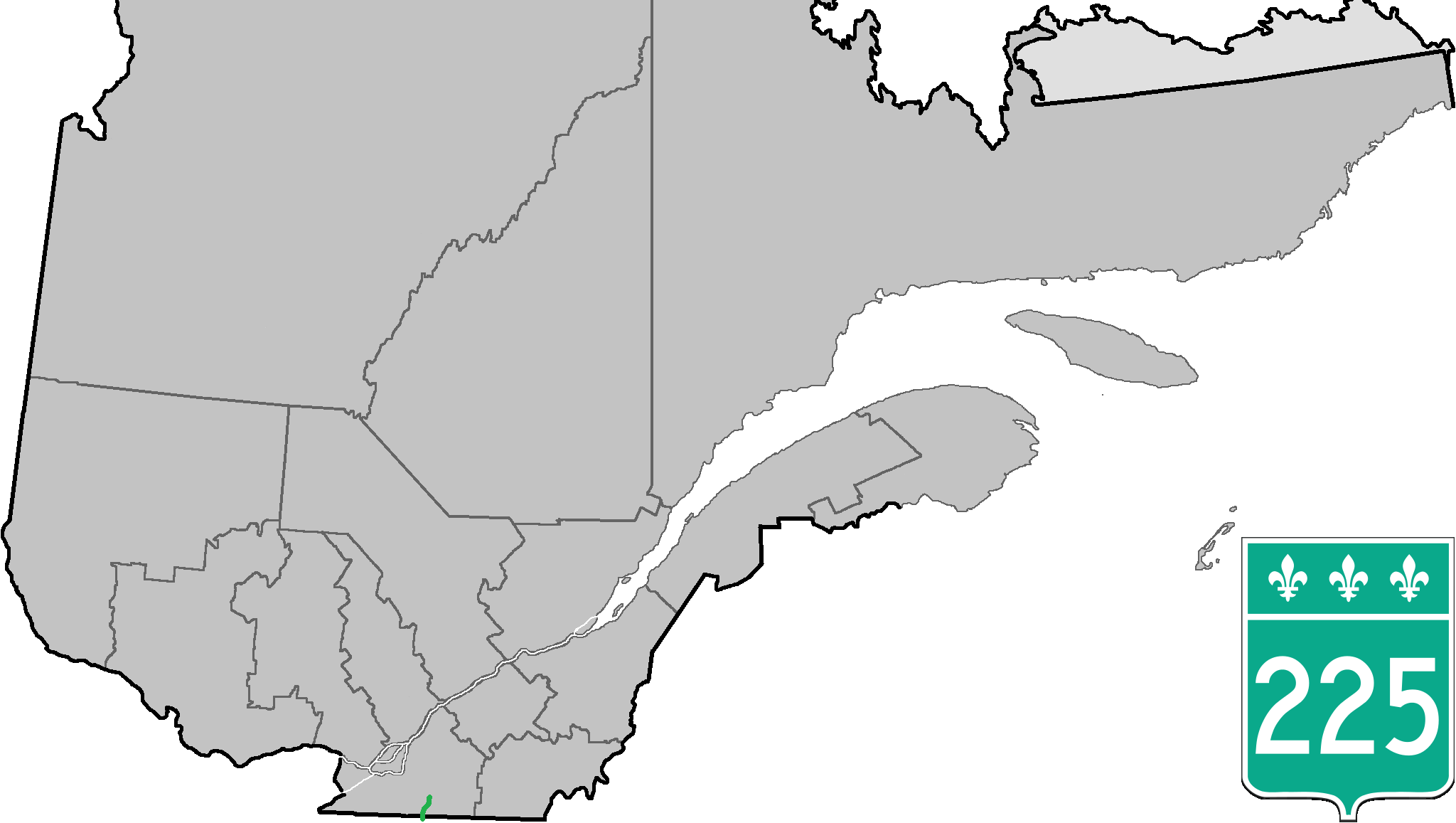

Route information
- Maintained by Transports Québec
- Length: 27.9 km (17.3 mi)

Major junctions
- South end: VT 225 at the U.S. border near Noyan
- R-202 in Noyan
- North end: R-133 in Sainte-Anne-de-Sabrevois

Location
- Country: Canada
- Province: Quebec

Highway system
- Quebec provincial highways; Autoroutes; List; Former
← R-224	→ R-226

Route 225 is a provincial highway located in the Montérégie region of Quebec. The route starts at the Canada-United States border at the Alburgh–Noyan Border Crossing in Noyan and runs north along the eastern shores of the Richelieu River, ending in Sainte-Anne-de-Sabrevois at the junction of Route 133.

== Municipalities along Route 225 ==
- Noyan
- Henryville
- Sainte-Anne-de-Sabrevois

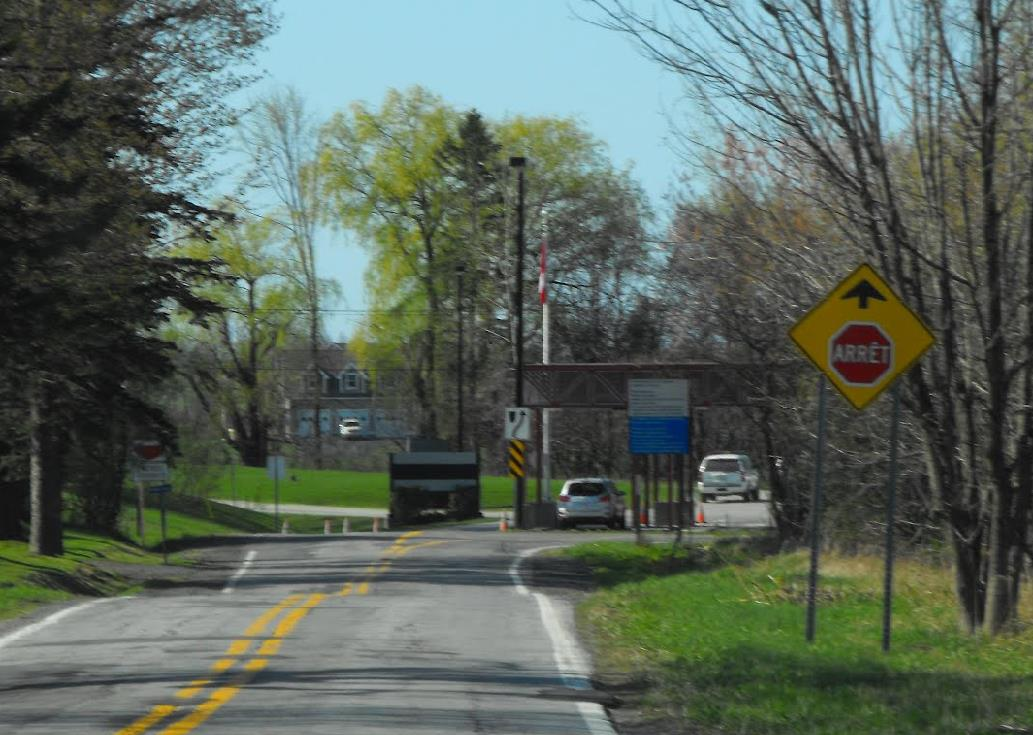
Route 225 southern end at Alburgh―Noyan border crossing.

== See also ==
- List of Quebec provincial highways
