= Noyan, Quebec =

Noyan
- Municipality
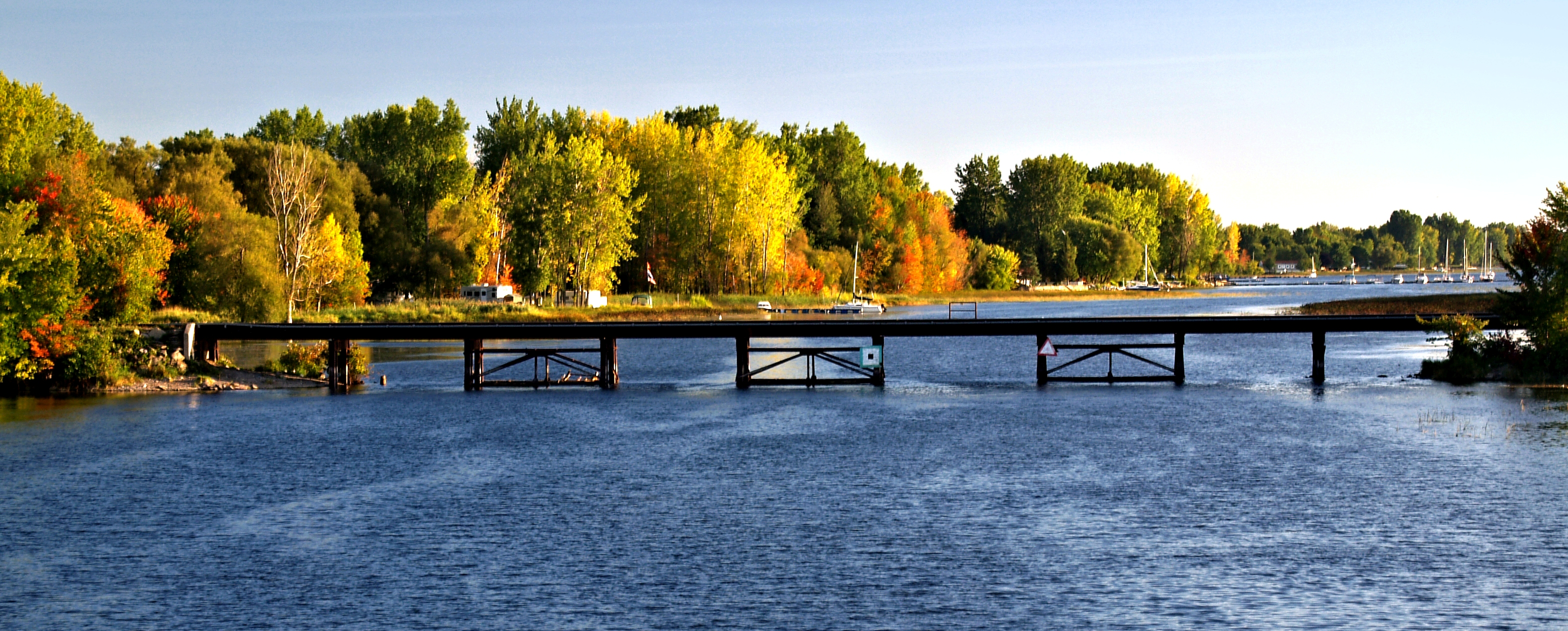
- Canadian National railway bridge, Noyan

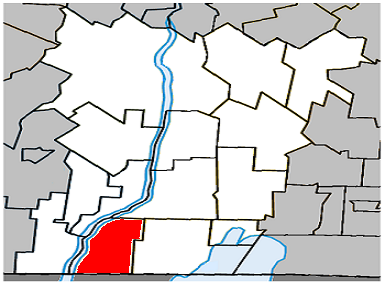
- Location within Le Haut-Richelieu RCM.

- Location within southern Quebec.
- Coordinates: 45°04′N 73°18′W
- Country: Canada
- Province: Quebec
- Region: Montérégie
- RCM: Le Haut-Richelieu
- Constituted: July 1, 1855
- Named for: Pierre Payen de Noyan

Government
  - Mayor: Réal Ryan
  - Federal riding: Brome—Missisquoi
  - Prov. riding: Iberville

Area
  - Total: 50.00 km^{2} (19.31 sq mi)
  - Land: 44.28 km^{2} (17.10 sq mi)

Population (2021)
  - Total: 1,418
  - Density: 32/km^{2} (83/sq mi)
  - Pop 2016-2021: ▲1.9%
  - Dwellings: 823
- Time zone: UTC−5 (EST)
  - Summer (DST): UTC−4 (EDT)
- Postal code(s): J0J 1B0
- Area codes: 450 and 579
- Highways: R-202; R-225
- Website: www.ville.noyan.qc.ca

Noyan (French pronunciation: [nwajɑ̃]) is a municipality in the province of Quebec, Canada, located in Le Haut-Richelieu Regional County Municipality. The population as of the Canada 2021 Census was 1,418.

== Demographics ==
=== Population ===
Canada census – Noyan community profile

	2021	2016	2011
Population	1,418 (+1.9% from 2016)	1,392 (+7.3% from 2011)	1,297 (-4.2% from 2006)
Land area	44.28 km^{2} (17.10 sq mi)	44.30 km^{2} (17.10 sq mi)	44.77 km^{2} (17.29 sq mi)
Population density	32/km^{2} (83/sq mi)	31.4/km^{2} (81/sq mi)	29.0/km^{2} (75/sq mi)
Median age	50.8 (M: 52.4, F: 49.6)	50.7 (M: 51.9, F: 48.8)	47.6 (M: 48.3, F: 47.2)
Private dwellings	645 (total)	795 (total)	756 (total)
Median household income	$65,000	$51,744	$44,611

References: 2021 2016 2011

Historical Census Data - Noyan, Quebec

Year	Pop.	±%
1861	811	—
1871	870	+7.3%
1881	812	−6.7%
1891	698	−14.0%
1901	641	−8.2%
1911	619	−3.4%
1921	542	−12.4%
1931	561	+3.5%

Year	Pop.	±%
1941	556	−0.9%
1951	507	−8.8%
1956	505	−0.4%
1961	525	+4.0%
1966	503	−4.2%
1971	538	+7.0%
1976	622	+15.6%
1981	687	+10.5%

Year	Pop.	±%
1986	724	+5.4%
1991	912	+26.0%
1996	1,012	+11.0%
2001	1,093	+8.0%
2006	1,354	+23.9%
2011	1,297	−4.2%
2016	1,392	+7.3%
2021	1,418	+1.9%

=== Language ===
Canada Census Mother Tongue - Noyan, Quebec
Census	Total	French			English			French & English			Other		
Year	Responses	Count	Trend	Pop %	Count	Trend	Pop %	Count	Trend	Pop %	Count	Trend	Pop %
2021	1,395	1,075	▲1.4%	76.0%	245	▼2.0%	17.3%	25	▲66.7%	1.8%	60	0.0%	4.2%
2016	1,395	1,060	▲14.6%	76.0%	250	▼9.1%	17.9%	15	▼25.0%	1.1%	60	▼20.0%	4.3%
2011	1,295	925	▲0.5%	71.4%	275	▼12.7%	21.2%	20	0.0%	1.5%	75	▼16.7%	5.8%
2006	1,345	920	▲30.5%	68.4%	315	▼4.5%	23.4%	20	▲100.0%	1.5%	90	▲80.0%	6.7%
2001	1,095	705	▲8.5%	64.4%	330	▲11.9%	30.1%	10	▼66.7%	0.9%	50	0.0%	4.6%
1996	1,025	650	n/a	63.4%	295	n/a	28.8%	30	n/a	2.9%	50	n/a	4.9%

== Notable people ==
- Raymond Bellemare, Graphic designer

== See also ==
- List of anglophone communities in Quebec
- List of municipalities in Quebec
