= Sainte-Anne-de-Sabrevois =

- Parish municipality
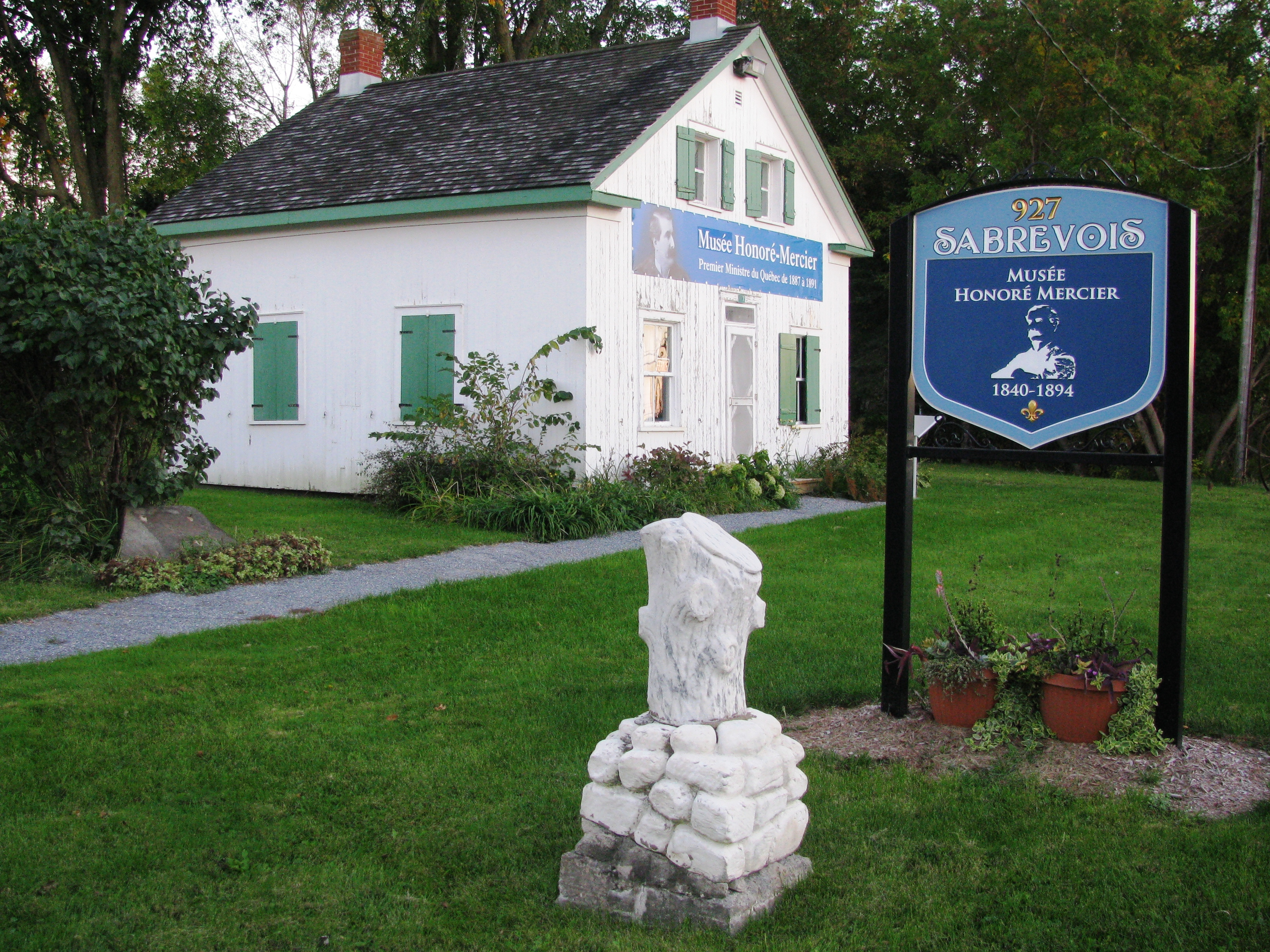
- Birthplace of Honoré Mercier

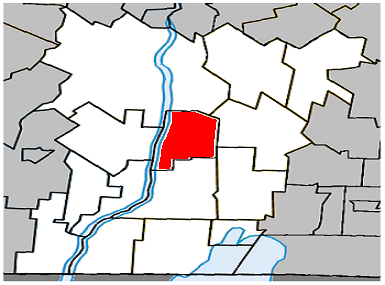
- Location within Le Haut-Richelieu RCM

- Location in southern Quebec
- Coordinates: 45°12′N 73°13′W
- Country: Canada
- Province: Quebec
- Region: Montérégie
- RCM: Le Haut-Richelieu
- Constituted: March 1, 1888

Government
  - Mayor: Clément Couture
  - Federal riding: Saint-Jean
  - Prov. riding: Iberville

Area
  - Total: 48.60 km^{2} (18.76 sq mi)
  - Land: 44.81 km^{2} (17.30 sq mi)

Population (2011)
  - Total: 2,074
  - Density: 46.3/km^{2} (120/sq mi)
  - Pop 2006-2011: ▲9.8%
  - Dwellings: 877
- Time zone: UTC−5 (EST)
  - Summer (DST): UTC−4 (EDT)
- Postal code(s): J0J 2G0
- Area codes: 450 and 579
- Highways: R-133; R-225

Sainte-Anne-de-Sabrevois (French pronunciation: [sɛ̃t an də sabʁəvwa]) is a parish municipality in the province of Quebec, Canada, located in the Regional County Municipality of Le Haut-Richelieu. The population as of the Canada 2011 Census was 2,074.

== Demographics ==
Historical Census Data - Sainte-Anne-de-Sabrevois, Quebec
Year	Pop.	±%
1991	1,735	—
1996	1,910	+10.1%
2001	1,914	+0.2%
2006	1,889	−1.3%
2011	2,074	+9.8%

In the 2021 Census of Population conducted by Statistics Canada, Sainte-Anne-de-Sabrevois had a population of 2,143 living in 881 of its 932 total private dwellings, a change of 5.1% from its 2016 population of 2,039. With a land area of 44.65 km^{2} (17.24 sq mi), it had a population density of 48.0/km^{2} (124.3/sq mi) in 2021.

Canada census – Sainte-Anne-de-Sabrevois community profile

	2021	2011
Population	2,143 (+5.1% from 2016)	2,074 (+9.8% from 2006)
Land area	44.65 km^{2} (17.24 sq mi)	44.81 km^{2} (17.30 sq mi)
Population density	48/km^{2} (120/sq mi)	46.3/km^{2} (120/sq mi)
Median age	41.2 (M: 41.2, F: 40.8)	40.3 (M: 41.2, F: 39.5)
Private dwellings	880 (total)	877 (total)
Median household income		$56,513

References: 2021 2011

Canada Census Mother Tongue - Sainte-Anne-de-Sabrevois, Quebec
Census	Total	French			English			French & English			Other		
Year	Responses	Count	Trend	Pop %	Count	Trend	Pop %	Count	Trend	Pop %	Count	Trend	Pop %
2011	2,070	1,990	▲9.3%	96.14%	45	▲80.0%	2.17%	15	▲ n/a%	0.72%	20	▼20.0%	0.97%
2006	1,870	1,820	▼2.7%	97.33%	25	0.0%	1.34%	0	▼100.0%	0.00%	25	▲66.7%	1.34%
2001	1,920	1,870	▲1.9%	97.40%	25	▼54.5%	1.30%	10	0.0%	0.52%	15	0.0%	0.78%
1996	1,915	1,835	n/a	95.82%	55	n/a	2.87%	10	n/a	0.52%	15	n/a	0.78%

== Education ==
The South Shore Protestant Regional School Board previously served the municipality.

== See also ==
- List of parish municipalities in Quebec
