= Sainte-Marie Island (Richelieu River) =

Island in Quebec, Canada

- Location within Quebec

Geography
- Location: Carignan, La Vallée-du-Richelieu Regional County Municipality, Montérégie, Québec, Canada
- Coordinates: 45.386389°N 73.256389°W
- Length: 0.8 km (0.5 mi)
- Width: 0.15 km (0.093 mi)

Administration
- Canada

Additional information
- Accessible by a single road bridge.

L'île Sainte-Marie (English: Sainte-Marie Island) is a river island of the Richelieu River. It is located in the territory of the municipality of Carignan, in the La Vallée-du-Richelieu Regional County Municipality, in the administrative region from Montérégie, in the south of province of Quebec, to Canada.

Île Sainte-Marie is located downstream from Sainte-Thérèse Island, from which it is separated by a narrow channel.

== Geography ==
Very elongated in shape, Île Sainte-Marie measures 800 metres (2,600 ft) in length by 150 metres (490 ft) of maximum width. It is connected to the left bank of the Richelieu River by a road which passes over the pier forming the right bank of the Chambly Canal.

Île Sainte-Marie faces east from the confluence of La Grande Décharge (stream coming from the east); at this location, the distance between the island and the east bank of the Richelieu River is 0.38 kilometres (0.24 mi). Île Sainte-Marie also faces the Chambly Canal National Historic Site of Canada, which is located on the west side of the canal.

== History ==
Quebec historians generally locate the old fort Sainte Thérèse, which has disappeared today, opposite Île Sainte-Marie.

== Toponymy ==
The name of island comes from that of a former owner, Jean Sainte-Marie.

The toponym "Île Sainte-Marie" was formalized on December 5, 1968, at the Place Names Bank of the Commission de toponymie du Québec.

== Occupation ==
Formerly an agricultural territory, Île Sainte-Marie is now occupied by around thirty residences. The "Rue de l'Île-Sainte-Marie" is the main road on the island.
