= Sainte-Thérèse Island (Richelieu River) =

Island in Quebec, Canada

Native name: Île Sainte-Thérèse
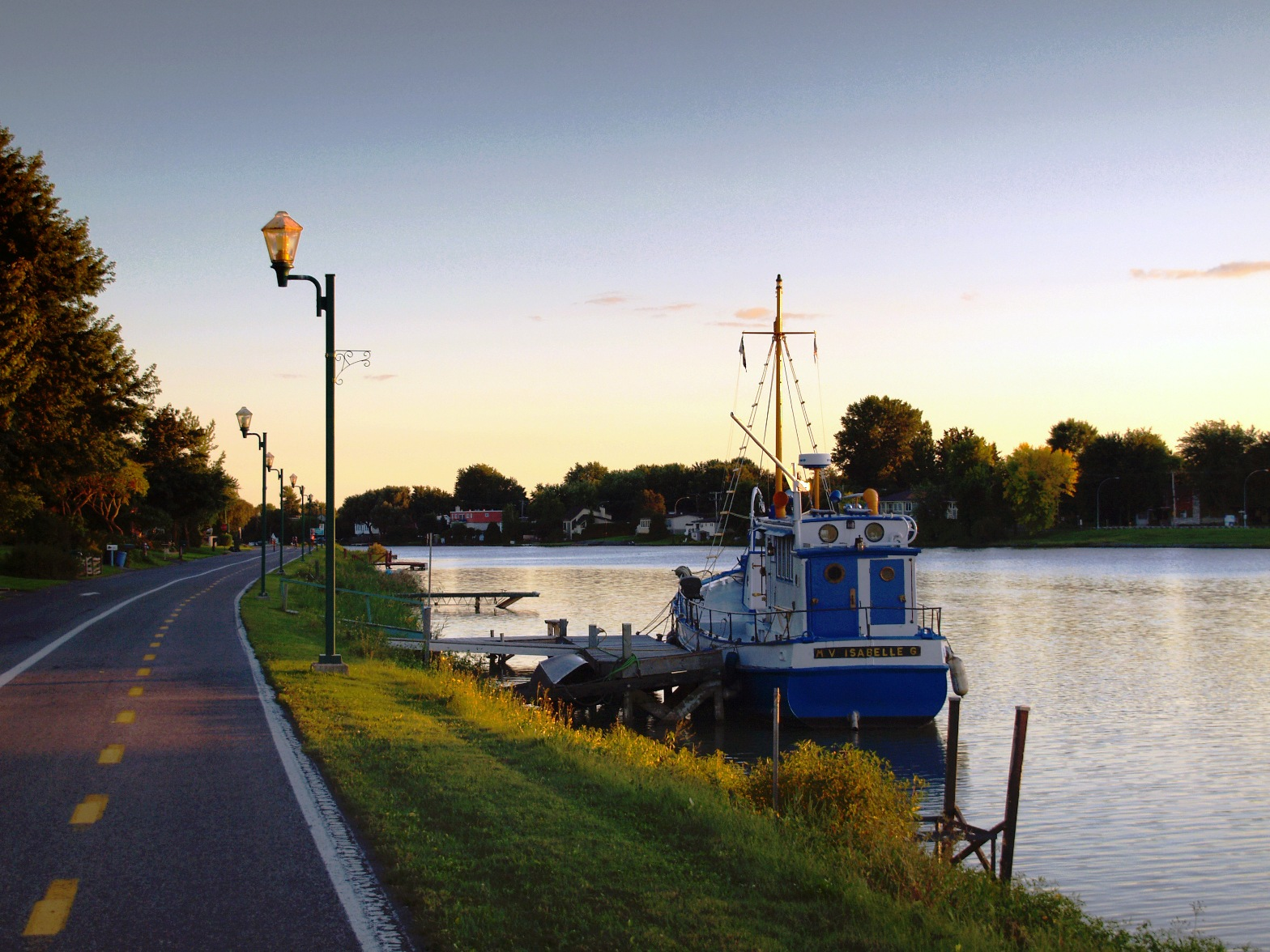

- Location within Quebec

Geography
- Location: Saint-Jean-sur-Richelieu, Le Haut-Richelieu Regional County Municipality, Montérégie, Québec, Canada
- Coordinates: 45.36417°N 73.25972°W
- Length: 3.9 km (2.42 mi)
- Width: 1.0 km (0.62 mi)

Administration
- Canada

Additional information
- Accessible by two bridges.

L île Sainte-Thérèse (English: Sainte-Thérèse Island) is a river island of the Richelieu River. It belongs to the territory of the municipality of Saint-Jean-sur-Richelieu, in the Saint-Luc sector, in the Le Haut-Richelieu Regional County Municipality, in the region administrative Montérégie, in the south of province of Quebec, in Canada.

== Geography ==
Sainte-Thérèse Island is located 8 kilometres (5.0 mi) upstream of the Chambly Basin and 37.4 kilometres (23.2 mi) north of the border between Canada and the United States.

Elongated in shape, Sainte-Thérèse Island measures approximately 3.9 kilometres (2.4 mi) in length and has a maximum width of 1.0 kilometre (0.62 mi). It is connected to the left bank of the Richelieu River by two road bridges spanning the canal (via the pier forming the right bank of the Chambly Canal). Baillargeon Street runs along the west shore of the island and is the main road.

The development of the Chambly Canal required the construction of a jetty to cut the channel at the northwestern end of the island. Rue Sainte-Thérèse, which runs along this pier, extends for 0.8 kilometres (0.50 mi) north to join the bridge leading to Île Sainte-Marie located downstream.

The island faces, on its west side, the rivière des Iroquois, which flows into the channel west of the island.

== Toponymy ==
Île Sainte-Thérèse takes its name from that of Fort Sainte Thérèse, built in 1665 and now disappeared. In all likelihood, the fort would have been located opposite the small Sainte-Marie Island, downstream from Sainte-Thérèse Island.

The toponym "Île Sainte-Thérèse" was formalized on December 5, 1968 at the Place Names Bank of the Commission de toponymie du Québec.

== Occupation ==
The Sainte-Thérèse island, once agricultural, is now largely residential. This island is entirely built of private residences. A community center is set up in the northern part of the island.

== See also ==
- Le Haut-Richelieu Regional County Municipality
- Saint-Jean-sur-Richelieu
- Richelieu River
- Chambly Canal
- List of islands of Quebec
