= List of crossings of the Richelieu River =

This is a list of bridges and ferries that cross the Richelieu River from the Saint Lawrence River upstream to Lake Champlain.

Key: Communities linked by individual crossings
(W): West-shore terminal (mainland)
(E): East-shore terminal (mainland)

== Crossings ==
Crossing	Picture	Year built	Communities linked	Carries	Name origin	Coordinates
Turcotte Bridge		circa 1937	(W) Tracy (E) Sorel	Route 132		46°02′29″N 73°07′03″W (Sorel-Tracy)
South Shore Railway Bridge		1896	(W) Tracy (E) Sorel	abandoned	South Shore Railway	46°02′17″N 73°06′58″W (Sorel-Tracy)
Sorel-Tracy Bridge		1968	(W) Tracy (E) Sorel	Autoroute 30	Communities of Sorel and Tracy	46°01′46″N 73°07′50″W (Sorel-Tracy)
St-Roch-de-Richelieu - St-Ours Ferry			(W) St-Roche-de-Richelieu (E) St-Ours			45°53′19″N 73°9′16″W (St-Roche-de-Richelieu); 45°53′17″N 73°9′7″W (St-Ours)
St-Antoine-sur-Richelieu - St-Denis Ferry			(W) St-Antoine-sur-Richelieu (E) St-Denis			45°47′14″N 73°9′56″W (St-Antoine-sur-Richelieu); 45°47′3″N 73°9′39″W (St-Denis)
St-Marc-sur-Richelieu - St-Charles-sur-Richelieu Ferry			(W) St-Marc-sur-Richelieu (E) St-Charles-sur-Richelieu			45°41′29″N 73°11′28″W (St-Marc-sur-Richelieu); 45°41′25″N 73°11′11″W (St-Charles-sur-Richelieu)
Arthur-Branchaud Bridge		1964	(W) Beloeil (E) Mont-St-Hilaire	Autoroute 20		45°35′39″N 73°11′19″W (Beloeil)
Jordi-Bonet Bridge			(W) Beloeil (E) Mont-St-Hilaire	Route 116	Jordi Bonet	45°33′50″N 73°12′01″W (Beloeil)
Canadian National Railway Bridge		December 27, 1848	(W) McMasterville (E) Mont-St-Hilaire	Canadian National Railway (CN) AMT Mont-Saint-Hilaire Line commuter train Via Rail passenger train	rail company using the bridge, originally the St. Lawrence & Atlantic Railroad	45°32′53″N 73°12′35″W (McMasterville)
Yule bridge			(W) Chambly (E) Richelieu	Route 112	Boulevard Richelieu	45°26′30″N 73°15′23″W (Chambly)
Montreal & Southern Counties Railway Bridge		September 22, 1877	(W) Chambly (E) Richelieu	abandoned	from the interurban railway company that used the bridge	45°26′22″N 73°15′19″W (Chambly)
Michel-Chartrand Bridge		1962	(W) Chambly (E) Richelieu	Autoroute 10		45°24′55″N 73°14′33″W (Chambly)
Felix-Gabriel-Marchand Bridge		1966	(W) St-Jean-sur-Richelieu (E) Iberville	Autoroute 35	Félix-Gabriel Marchand	45°19′36″N 73°15′34″W (St-Jean-sur-Richelieu)
Montreal, Maine & Atlantic Railway Bridge		August 8, 1887	(W) St-Jean-sur-Richelieu (E) Iberville	Montreal, Maine and Atlantic Railway (MM&AR)	by the current railway company operating over the bridge, originally was the Atlantic & North-West Railway	45°18′37″N 73°14′50″W (St-Jean-sur-Richelieu)
Gouin Bridge			(W) St-Jean-sur-Richelieu (E) Iberville	St-Jacques Road		45°18′21″N 73°14′47″W (St-Jean-sur-Richelieu)
Stanstead, Shefford & Chambly Railroad Bridge (demolished)		December 28, 1858 – 1965	(W) St-Jean-sur-Richelieu (E) Iberville		railroad company that built the crossing	45°18′8″N 73°14′48″W (St-Jean-sur-Richelieu)
Route 202 Bridge			(W) Notre-Dame-du-Mont-Carmel (E) Noyan	Route 202		45°3′51″N 73°19′49″W (Notre-Dame-du-Mont-Carmel)
Canada Atlantic Railway Bridge		July 1, 1888	(W) Notre-Dame-du-Mont-Carmel (E) Noyan	Canadian National Railway (CN) New England Central Railroad (NECR)	after the first railway company that built the bridge	45°3′40″N 73°19′53″W (Notre-Dame-du-Mont-Carmel)

== See also ==
- Richelieu River
- List of crossings of the Saint Lawrence River and the Great Lakes
