= Rivière des Iroquois (Richelieu River tributary) =

Location
- Country: Canada
- Province: Quebec
- Region: Montérégie
- Regional County Municipality: Le Haut-Richelieu Regional County Municipality
- Municipality: Saint-Jean-sur-Richelieu

Physical characteristics
- Source: Various agricultural streams
  - location: Saint-Jean-sur-Richelieu
  - coordinates: 45.347059°N 73.302385°W
  - elevation: 39 m (128 ft)
- Mouth: Richelieu River
  - location: Saint-Jean-sur-Richelieu
  - coordinates: 45.35944°N 73.26889°W
  - elevation: 23 m (75 ft)
- Length: 10.1 km (6.3 mi)

Basin features
- Progression: Richelieu River, Saint Lawrence River
- Tributaries
  - left: (Upstream) Maillé stream, Lemieux stream.
  - right: (Upstream) La Grande Décharge.

The Rivière des Iroquois is a tributary of the Richelieu River. It flows in the Saint-Luc sector, of the municipality of Saint-Jean-sur-Richelieu, in the Le Haut-Richelieu Regional County Municipality, in the region administrative of Montérégie, in southern part of the province of Quebec, in Canada.

The river surface is generally frozen from mid-December to the end of March. Safe traffic on the ice is generally from late December to early March. The water level of the river varies with the seasons and the precipitation.

== Geography ==
The main hydrographic slopes near the "Rivière des Iroquois" are:

- north side: Acadia River;
- east side: Richelieu River;
- south side: Bernier River, Roman-Moreau stream;
- west side: Acadia River.

The Rivière des Iroquois draws its head water from an agricultural area north of Chemin Saint-André, in the Saint-Luc sector, at Saint-Jean-sur-Richelieu.

This river flows northeast of the city of Saint-Jean-sur-Richelieu on:

- 4.0 km north-west at the limit of the agricultural zone, to the route 104 connecting the Saint-Luc sector to the town of La Prairie;
- 3.0 km north-east at the edge of the agricultural area, crossing the "Club de golf des Légendes" up to autoroute de la Vallée-des-Forts that the river crosses south of Chemin Saint-André;
- 2.3 km towards the south-east, zigzagging in an agricultural area until it meets a small stream coming from the north;
- 0.8 km south across route 223, to its mouth.

In short, the upper part of the Iroquois river surrounds the urban area of the Saint-Luc sector.

The Iroquois River flows onto the east bank of the Chambly Canal, located on the west side of the Richelieu River, opposite the Île Sainte -Thérèse, at the northern limit of the urban area of Saint-Jean-sur-Richelieu.

== Toponymy ==
The toponym "Rivière des Iroquois" was formalized on February 11, 1976 at the Place Names Bank of the Commission de toponymie du Québec.

== See also ==
- Richelieu River
- Saint-Jean-sur-Richelieu, a municipality
- Le Haut-Richelieu Regional County Municipality
- Île Sainte-Thérèse
- Chambly Canal
- List of rivers of Quebec
