= Fort Sainte Thérèse =

17th century French fort in Quebec

Fort Saint Thérèse
- Carignan, Quebec
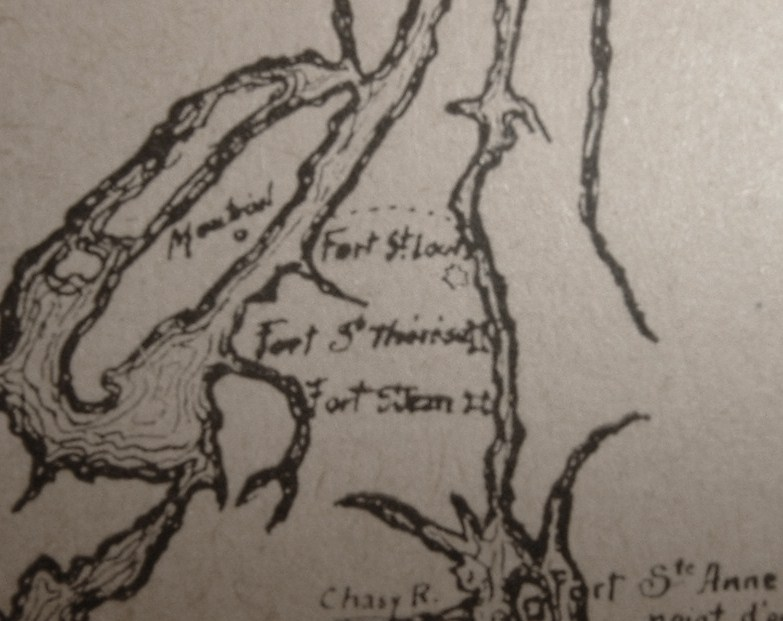
- Map of Fort Sainte Thérèse and other forts on the Richelieu River circa 1665 for the campagne of the Regiment of Carignan-Salières

Site information
- Type: Fort
- Controlled by: New France; Canada

National Historic Site of Canada
- Official name: Fort Ste. Thérèse National Historic Site of Canada
- Designated: 1923

Location
- Coordinates: 45.389111°N 73.257515°W

Site history
- Built: 1665
- In use: 1665–1760

Fort Sainte Thérèse is the name given to three different forts built successively on one site, among a series of fortifications constructed during the 17th century by France along the Richelieu River, in the province of Quebec, in Montérégie.

== History ==
=== First fort (1665–1667) ===
The first fortification was constructed in October 1665 by Henri de Chastelard de Salières, an officer under Alexandre de Prouville de Tracy, of the Carignan-Salières Regiment. He finished the fortifications on October 15, which was the religious anniversary of sainte Thérèse. Situated at the end of the Sainte-Thérèse rapids, the location of the fort was strategic. Fort Sainte Thérèse was abandoned in 1667.

=== Second fort (1747–1760) ===
In 1731, the governor of New France, because of his concerns about the behavior of the Iroquois and the English colonies to the south, ordered the reconstruction of forts along the Richelieu. This operation led to the construction of forts Pointe-à-la-Chevelure and Saint-Frédéric, both located near Lake Champlain. Following these undertakings, a road was built between Chambly and the old fort of Sainte Thérèse, and again between Chambly and La Prairie. In 1741 and 1742, Clément Sabrevois de Bleury constructed a hangar for boats at Sainte Thérèse, which served to store the boats of the King. Because of English threats from the south, commander Vassant was asked to build a new fort at Sainte Thérèse in 1747, and posted several regiments. The fort was abandoned the following year to concentrate efforts on Fort Saint-Jean, further south. However, what was left of Fort Sainte-Thérèse was used to stock merchandise during the British invasion of (1756–1759), until it was finally burned by major Robert Rogers and his men in 1760.

=== Third fort (1760) ===
During the British campaign on Montreal during the summer of 1760 the French and Canadiens sent soldiers to Fort Sainte Thérèse. In September, the fort already burnt, was abandoned by the French after being defeated at île aux Noix. The English took possession of the fort and built trenches all around it. The location served as a point of rally for the troops before the capture of Fort Chambly, on September 4, 1760.

== Sainte Thérèse after the British ==
The location of the fort was used by the British as an English Post. The troops improved the road between Sainte Thérèse and Chambly, which was extended to Saint-Jean in (1776), during the American Revolution. The fortifications, however, were in ruins and were quickly forgotten.

== Location rediscovered ==
The digging of the Chambly Canal, between 1831 and 1843, made the site of the fort less accessible. The site was designated a National Historic Site of Canada in 1923. In 1927, the Historic Sites and Monuments Board erected a stone and plaque to Fort Ste. Thérèse (at 45.397233, -73.260073), which referred to it being "on the point south-east beyond the canal". Construction of a dam from 1930 to 1938 disturbed the place where the fort was thought to be, and there was debate about its exact location. By the 1960s, archeologists had concluded it was impossible to confirm a precise location.

But around 2000, a well-known historian of the Richelieu Valley, Réal Fortin, along with Parks Canada, developed the hypothesis that it was situated on the south side of Point Portage facing the island of Sainte Marie. These findings were published in 2003. Reconstructing the deeds of the forts in the area, Fortin concluded that its location was lot 343 in the city of Carignan, on the west side of the Richelieu.

Subsequently, in November 2007, came a discovery: an aerial photograph taken in 1938, which showed the clear outline of the west side of the fort's remains (at 45.389111, -73.257515). This revealed it was south of where the 1927 plaque had described, but not too far. Archeological investigation commenced in the spring of 2008, and continued in August, 2009, and May 2010. The fort's location was confirmed, and several discoveries made, including the layout of all three forts, bastions, and palisades. The dig site was open to the public while archeologists worked on it, with interpretive talks offered on weekends. Findings are to be reported to the Historic Sites and Monuments Board to revise the national historic site designation, so that it includes newly found remnants of the outpost.

The site lies within Chambly Canal National Historic Site, and so is administered by Parks Canada, from offices at Fort Chambly.

== See also ==
- Fort Richelieu
- Fort Albany (Ontario)
- List of French forts in North America
