= Bernier River (Richelieu River tributary) =

Location
- Country: Canada
- Province: Quebec
- Region: Montérégie
- Regional County Municipality: Le Haut-Richelieu
- Unorganized territory and a municipality: Lac-Jacques-Cartier

Physical characteristics
- Source: Various agricultural streams
  - location: Saint-Jean-sur-Richelieu
  - coordinates: 45.225539°N 73.308348°W
  - elevation: 48
- Mouth: Richelieu River
  - location: Saint-Jean-sur-Richelieu
  - coordinates: 45.27972°N 73.2475°W
  - elevation: 30 m (98 ft)
- Length: 12.9 km (8.0 mi)

Basin features
- Progression: Richelieu River - St. Lawrence River
- Tributaries
  - left: (Upstream)
  - right: (Upstream) Ruisseau Lord-Oligny

The Bernier River is a tributary of the Richelieu River. It flows in the city of Saint-Jean-sur-Richelieu, in the regional county municipality (MRC) Le Haut-Richelieu Regional County Municipality, in the administrative region of Montérégie, in the south of province of Quebec, in Canada.

The river surface is generally frozen from mid-December to the end of March. Safe traffic on the ice is generally from late December to early March. The water level of the river varies with the seasons and the precipitation.

== Geography ==
The main hydrographic slopes neighboring the "Bernier river" are:

- north side: Rivière des Iroquois (Richelieu River);
- east side: Richelieu River;
- south side: Milieu and Trait Carré stream, Rouillé stream
- west side: Acadia River.

The Bernier River takes its source at the Grande Ligne road, northwest of Saint-Blaise-sur-Richelieu and southwest of Saint-Jean-sur-Richelieu.

The Bernier River flows over 12.9 km first northwards over 4.3 km in agricultural area; 1.4 km east; 3.1 km north-east; and 4.1 km east, crossing the golf course, then the town of Saint-Jean-sur-Richelieu meandering, to its mouth.

The mouth of the Bernier River is located on the east bank of the Richelieu River, three km upstream from the Gouin bridge, 5.5 km upstream from the Félix-Gabriel-Marchand bridge, at 8.9 km upstream of the Iroquois River, 1.1 km downstream from Barbotte stream (coming from the east) and 4.8 km downstream from the stream Samoisette (coming from the west).

== Toponymy ==
Under the French Regime (completed in 1760), this river was designated "Rivière du Nord" because of its situation opposite to the "Rivière du Sud", the mouth of which flows 15.5 km upstream on the east bank. of the Richelieu River.

During the American Revolutionary War, the river was renamed "Montgomery's Creek" or "Ruisseau Montgomery". This term evokes a landing of the troops of the American general Richard Montgomery (1738-1775) carried out in the autumn of 1775 in order to attack Fort Saint-Jean. After a long 45-day siege in front of the fort, Montgomery and his men took Montreal. The general died during the assault on Quebec City on December 31, 1775.

Subsequently, the river is designated "Golf Creek" because it crosses in its lower part, a golf course. At the beginning of the 1960s, its toponym became "Bernier river", after Grand-Bernier and Petit-Bernier, the traditional names for the cadastral rows where the watercourse takes its source. These ranks would themselves be named in honor of Joseph-Pierre Bernier who helped the exiled Acadians so that they could settle in these ranks.

The toponym "Rivière Bernier" was formalized on December 5, 1968, at the Commission de toponymie du Québec.

== See also ==
- Richelieu River, a stream
- Saint-Jean-sur-Richelieu, a municipality
- Le Haut-Richelieu Regional County Municipality
- List of rivers of Quebec
