= Saint-Blaise-sur-Richelieu =

- Municipality
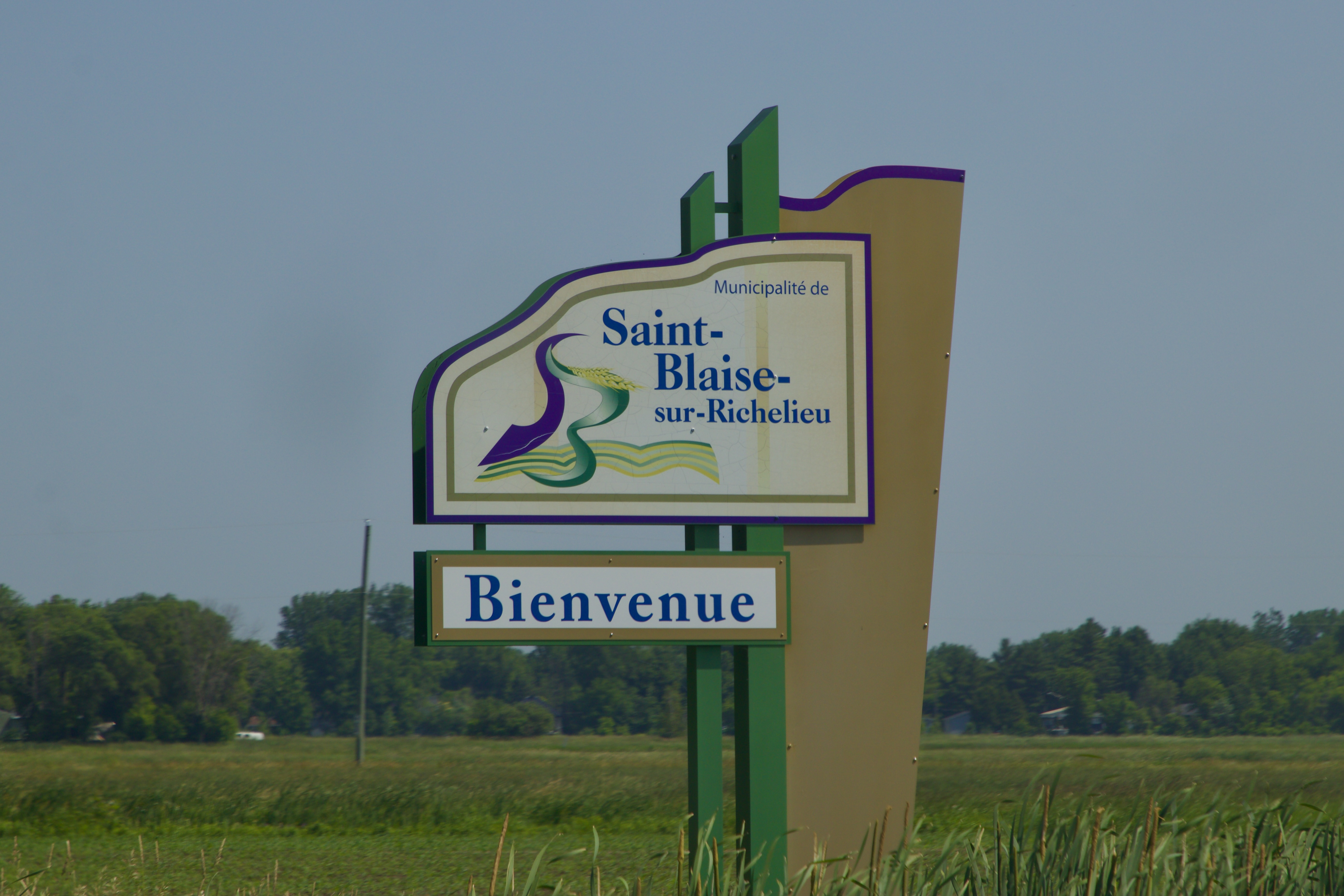
- Saint-Blaise-sur-Richelieu welcome sign

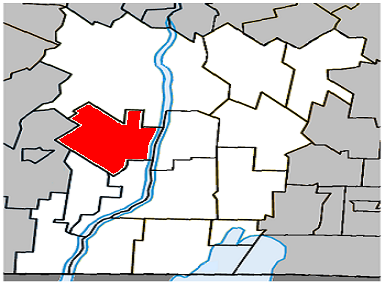
- Location within Le Haut-Richelieu RCM.

- Location in southern Quebec.
- Coordinates: 45°13′N 73°17′W
- Country: Canada
- Province: Quebec
- Region: Montérégie
- RCM: Le Haut-Richelieu
- Constituted: June 20, 1892
- Named for: Saint Blaise and Richelieu River

Government
  - Mayor: Jacques Desmarais
  - Federal riding: Saint-Jean
  - Prov. riding: Saint-Jean

Area
  - Total: 72.30 km^{2} (27.92 sq mi)
  - Land: 69.64 km^{2} (26.89 sq mi)

Population (2016)
  - Total: 2,066
  - Density: 29.7/km^{2} (77/sq mi)
  - Pop 2011-2016: ▲12.5%
  - Dwellings: 872
- Time zone: UTC−5 (EST)
  - Summer (DST): UTC−4 (EDT)
- Postal code(s): J0J 1W0
- Area codes: 450 and 579
- Highways: R-223
- Website: www.st-blaise.ca

Saint-Blaise-sur-Richelieu (French pronunciation: [sɛ̃ blɛz syʁ ʁiʃ(ə)ljø], lit. 'Saint-Blaise on Richelieu') is a municipality in the Canadian province of Quebec. The population as of the Canada 2016 Census was 2,066. The town was founded in 1892.

== Geography ==
The community is located within the Le Haut-Richelieu Regional County Municipality region about 15 kilometres north of the Canada-United States border in the Montérégie region. It is located about 40 kilometers south of Montreal.

The town is located within the provincial electoral district of Saint-Jean which includes parts of the city of Saint-Jean-sur-Richelieu situated a few kilometers to its north. It is situated in the western side of the Richelieu River along Quebec Route 223.

== Demographics ==
=== Population ===
Canada census – Saint-Blaise-sur-Richelieu community profile

	2021	2016	2011
Population	2,092 (+1.3% from 2016)	2,066 (12.5% from 2011)	1,837 (-10.4% from 2006)
Land area	69.54 km^{2} (26.85 sq mi)	69.64 km^{2} (26.89 sq mi)	69.78 km^{2} (26.94 sq mi)
Population density	30.1/km^{2} (78/sq mi)	29.7/km^{2} (77/sq mi)	26.3/km^{2} (68/sq mi)
Median age	44 (M: 43.6, F: 44)	44.4 (M: 44.4, F: 44.5)	44.4 (M: 44.1, F: 44.5)
Private dwellings	855 (total)	872 (total)	847 (total)
Median household income		$67,925	$.N/A

Notes: 2011 income data for this area has been suppressed for data quality or confidentiality reasons.
References: 2021 2016 2011

Historical Census Data - Saint-Blaise-sur-Richelieu, Quebec

Year	Pop.	±%
1991	1,893	—
1996	2,067	+9.2%

Year	Pop.	±%
2001	1,997	−3.4%
2006	2,050	+2.7%

Year	Pop.	±%
2011	1,837	−10.4%
2016	2,066	+12.5%

=== Language ===
Canada Census Mother Tongue - Saint-Blaise-sur-Richelieu, Quebec
Census	Total	French			English			French & English			Other		
Year	Responses	Count	Trend	Pop %	Count	Trend	Pop %	Count	Trend	Pop %	Count	Trend	Pop %
2016	2,055	1,945	▲12.8%	94.6%	70	▲40.0%	3.4%	10	▼66.7%	0.5%	35	▲40.0%	1.7%
2011	1,830	1,725	▼9.7%	94.26%	50	▼9.1%	2.73%	30	▲50.0%	1.64%	25	▼58.3%	1.37%
2006	2,045	1,910	▲3.0%	93.40%	55	▼35.3%	2.69%	20	▲100.0%	0.98%	60	▲20.0%	2.93%
2001	2,000	1,855	▼5.1%	92.75%	85	▲112.5%	4.25%	10	▼50.0%	0.50%	50	0.0%	2.50%
1996	2,065	1,955	n/a	94.67%	40	n/a	1.94%	20	n/a	0.97%	50	n/a	2.42%

== Government ==
=== Municipal Council ===
- Jacques Desmarais, mayor
- Ronald Girardin, councillor (district #1)
- Christien Madison, councillor (district #2)
- Sylvain Raymond, councillor (district #3)
- Jules Bergerons, councillor (district #4)
- Éric Lachance councillor (district #5)
- Alain Gaucher, councillor (district #6)

== Education ==
The South Shore Protestant Regional School Board previously served the municipality.

== See also ==
- List of municipalities in Quebec
