= International Balloon Festival of Saint-Jean-sur-Richelieu =

Largest hot air balloon festival in Canada

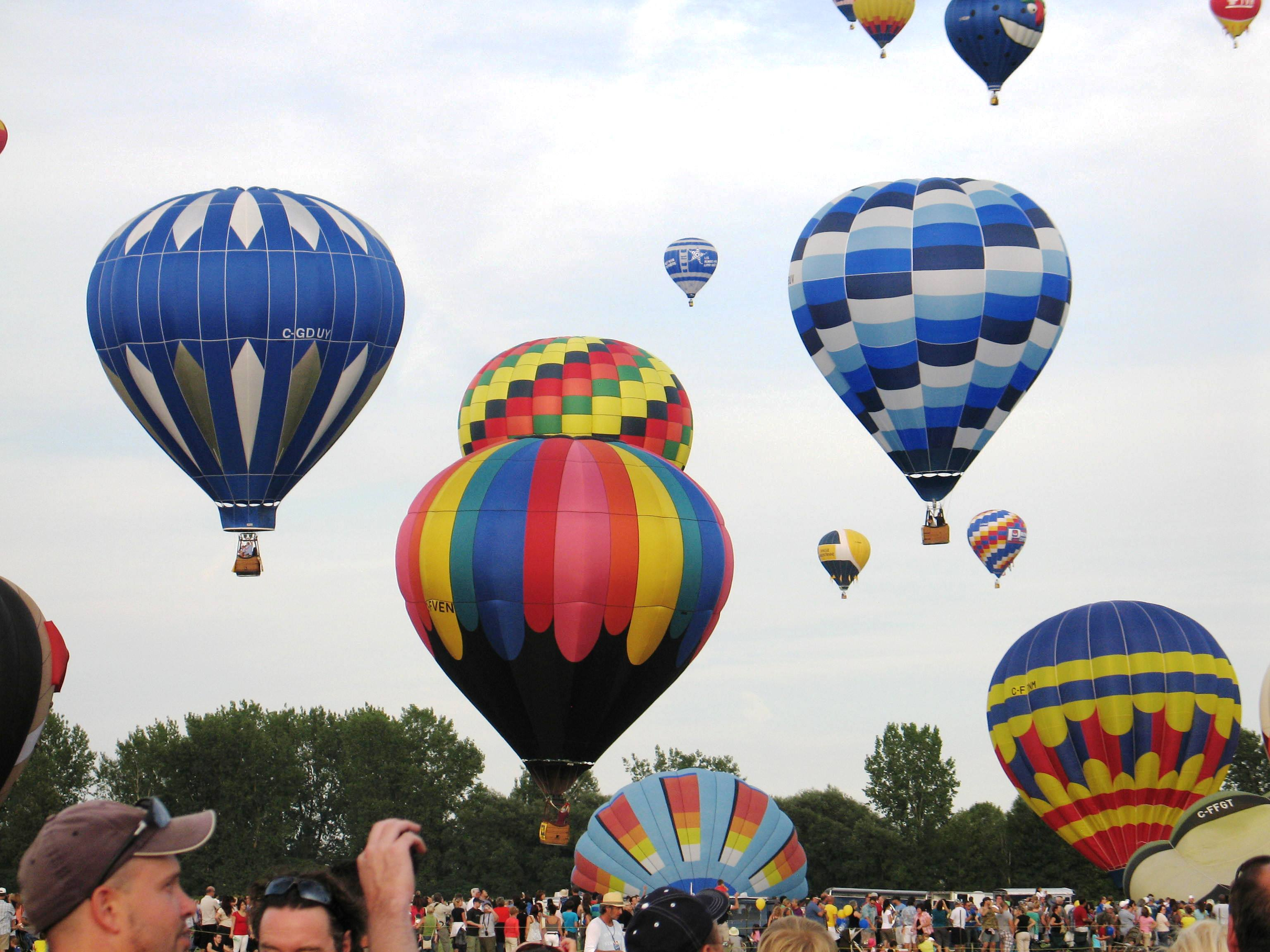
The 2011 International Balloon Festival of Saint-Jean-sur-Richelieu.

The International Balloon Festival of Saint-Jean-sur-Richelieu is the largest hot air balloon festival in Canada. It is held each August in Saint-Jean-sur-Richelieu, Quebec, about 40 minutes southeast of Montreal and about halfway between Montreal and Vermont.

The festival is situated at the Saint-Jean Airport and weather permitting (no storm activity detected within range, 50 km (31 mi), and winds above 12 km/h (7.5 mph)), there are two flight launches each day: a morning flight at 6:00 am and an evening flight between 6:00 and 7:00 pm. Other festival activities include amusement rides, musical and comedy shows and "Nuits magiques" (tethered night flights).

This festival went on hiatus in 2020, but returned in 2022. The 2023 edition, which was also the 40th edition in the festival's history, was held from August 11-13 and August 17-20, 2023. The 2024 edition will be held from August 9-11 and August 15-18, 2024.
