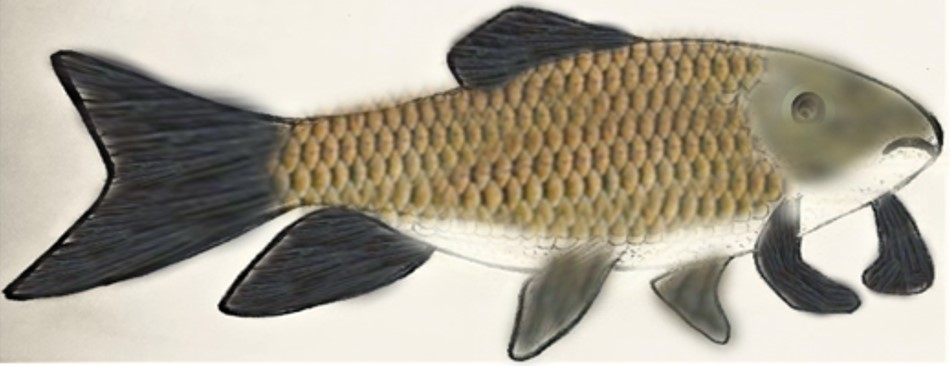

Conservation status
- Endangered (IUCN 3.1)

Scientific classification
- Kingdom: Animalia
- Phylum: Chordata
- Class: Actinopterygii
- Division: Teleostei
- Order: Cypriniformes
- Family: Catostomidae
- Genus: Moxostoma
- Species: M. hubbsi

Binomial name
- Moxostoma hubbsi Legendre, 1952

= Copper redhorse =

Species of fish

The copper redhorse (Moxostoma hubbsi) is a North American species of freshwater fish in the family Catostomidae. It is found only in Quebec.

Its extremely small range, which is restricted to a few rivers in the lowlands of southwestern Quebec, has contracted significantly in the past few decades. Confirmed populations currently exist in the St. Lawrence, Richelieu rivers and the Rivière des Mille Îles. The copper redhorse is one of seven species of the genus Moxostoma (family Catostomidae) occurring in Canada.

== Taxonomy ==
In 1866, Pierre Fortin described a species of redhorse in his list of fishes of the Gulf and St. Lawrence river, which was found to be the copper redhorse in a study in 1999. In 1942 it was officially described in a new genus Megaphrynax and was named Megaphrynax valeciennsi. In 1954, it was moved to the genus Moxostoma and renamed Moxostoma hubbi in honor Carl. L Hubbs. In 1956, it was placed into the subgenus Megaphrynax along with Moxostoma valencci. In 2002, Megapharynx was found to be non-monophyletic and the subgenus was invalidated.

== Description ==
The copper redhorse is a robustly and deeply bodied species compared to others in the genus Moxostoma. The species ranges from 40.64 to 45.72 cm (16 to 18 in). it is compressed laterally, with the back forming a huge arch which forms a humpback shape. The head is relatively small compared to the body. It has a thick yet non noticeable lips, along with a small mouth and a gape which can reach the nostrils. While the mouth is toothless, it does have a single row of big pharyngeal teeth. The operculum's gill rakers are medium in size and widely spaced, and there's 18-19 of them. The copper redhorse only has 1 dorsal fin which has 13- 14 rays. The caudal fin is abdominal, wide, is rounded and has 9-10 rays. The pelvic fin is abdominal, have rounded tips, and have 9-10 rays. the pectoral fin is long and broad, have rounded tips, and 16-17 rays. The scales are large and cycloid in shape. Males may develop large nuptial tubercles on the anal and caudal fins. Smaller ones can be found on the rest of the fins, the head, and the lateral and dorsal parts of the body.

Unlike most other species in the genus Moxostoma, the copper redhorse has molar shaped teeth which aid it in crushing it's food of hard shelled bivalves.

In terms of coloration, the dorsal and upper surface is an olive to brown, reflecting golden, green and copper. The lower you get, it starts to shift to be more lighter with more dark browns. The ventral surface is milk white to dusky yellow. The caudal fin is bright red, while the anal fin is bright red to orange. All the other fins are orange to pink, yellow, and orange.

== Habitat ==
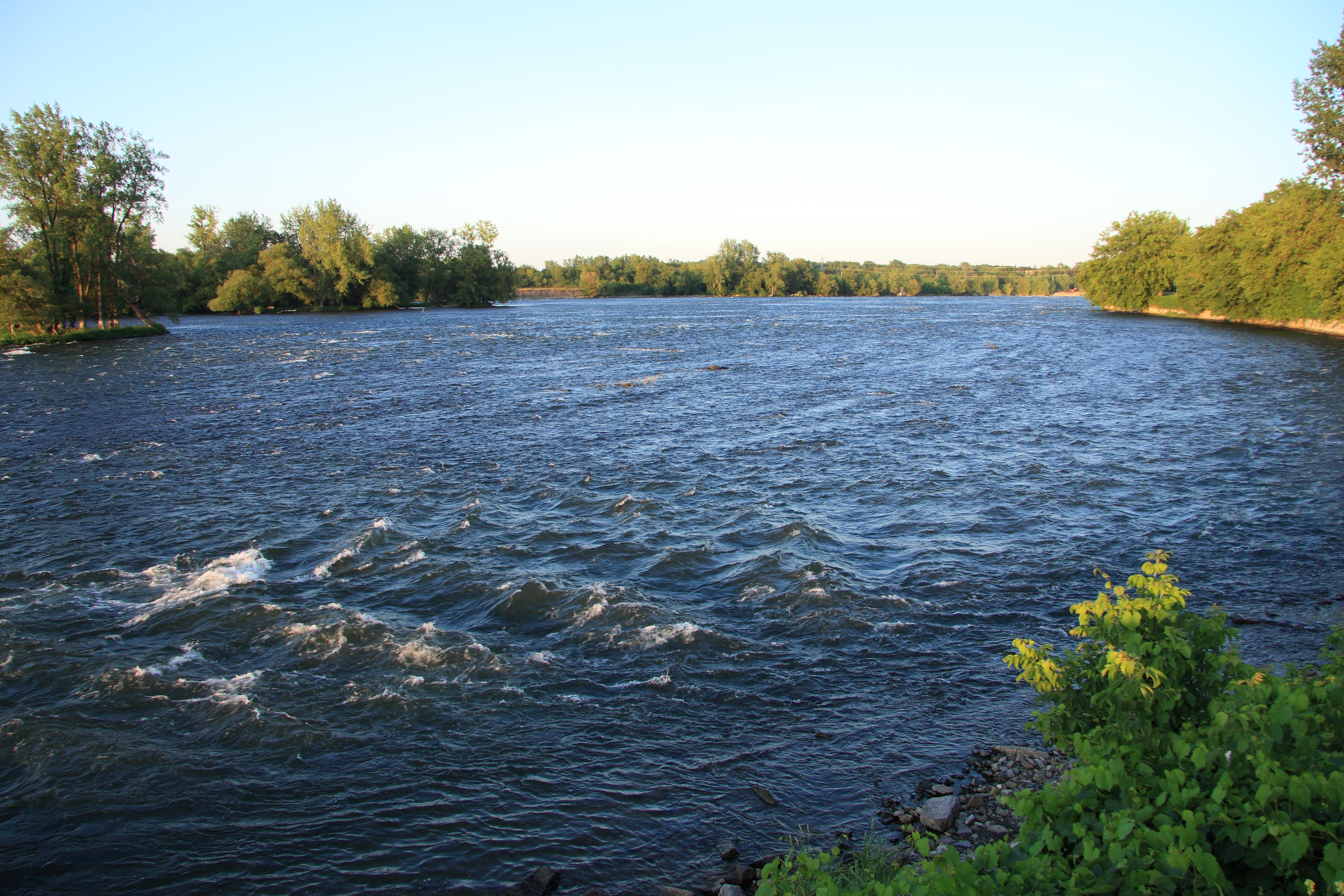
Spawning area on Richelieu River at Chambly

The copper redhorse occurs primarily in medium-sized rivers where water temperatures exceed 20 °C in summer. Spawning occurs in riffle areas where the current is moderate to slow and the depth ranges between 0.75 and 2 m, over fine to coarse gravel and cobble substrate. Like its congeners, young-of-the-year copper redhorse spend their first growing season in shallow shoreline areas no more than 1.5 m deep, characterized by gentle slopes, vegetation, a very slow current and fine substrate (mix of clay-silt and sand).

To date, there are only two known spawning grounds (Chambly archipelago and the channel downstream from the Saint-Ours dam) and a nursery area (Saint-Marc-sur-Richelieu) has been identified in the Richelieu River. Very recently, the presence of copper redhorse has again been reported in the Lavaltrie-Contrecoeur sector of the St. Lawrence River. The reasons for its presence in this stretch of the river in the spring and early summer (pre-spawning congregation, spawning or migration route) and fall (wintering grounds) could not be determined. High quality copper redhorse habitat is in decline. Its apparent extirpation from the Yamaska and Noire rivers is closely linked to environmental degradation.

== Population sizes and trends ==
Archaeological excavations provide evidence that the species was more abundant at various times in the past. Since the mid-1980s, its abundance relative to the other species in the genus has declined significantly. The population is aging and recruitment is extremely low. Compared to its congeners, the relative abundance of young-of-the-year copper redhorse in the Richelieu River, the only river in which spawning is confirmed, is 0.35% or less. The upward shift in size distribution values in the past 30 to 40 years is significant. There have been virtually no catches of juveniles aged 2+ years in the last 30 years. The total number of mature individuals appears to be several thousand at the most.

== Limiting factors and threats ==
A number of biological characteristics of the copper redhorse, such as its longevity, late age of sexual maturity, late spawning activities and specialized diet, make it unique among its congeners. However, they also contribute, in some respects, to making it more vulnerable. Since the waters inhabited by the copper redhorse are located in the most densely populated areas of Quebec, anthropogenic factors come into play. The nature of those factors cannot, however, be determined with certainty and act in combination. The degradation and fragmentation of its habitat and its low spawning success are believed to be key reasons for its decline. Contamination, siltation, eutrophication, introductions of non-native species, dam construction (which impedes the free passage of fish) and the disturbance of spawners on spawning sites all constitute possible factors in the species' decline.

== Special significance of the species ==
The significance of the copper redhorse is not limited to scientific and ecological considerations. It extends to social values, sustainable development and biodiversity conservation. In some respects, the species is an indicator of the impact of human activity on the ecosystems of southern Quebec. Public interest in the species is not only strong but continues to grow.
