= Richelieu River =

River in Quebec, Canada; right tributary of the St. Lawrence

Coordinates: 46°02′49″N 73°07′12″W

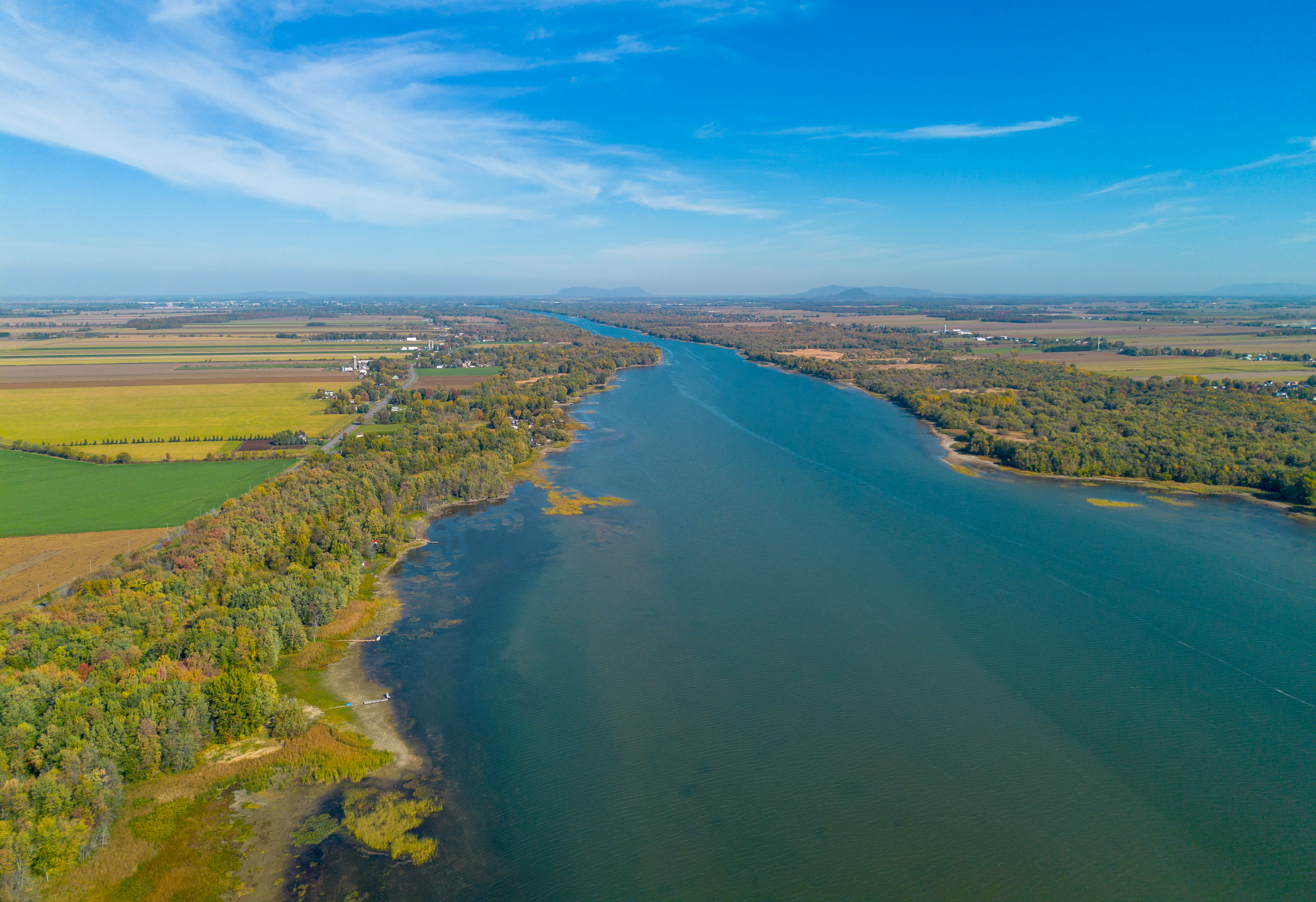
- Richelieu River at Saint-Blaise-sur-Richelieu

Location
- Country: Canada, and appreciable parts of New York State and Vermont

Physical characteristics
- Source
  - location: Lake Champlain
- Mouth
  - location: Saint Lawrence River at Sorel
- Length: 124 km (77 mi)
- Basin size: 23,720 km^{2} (9,160 sq mi)
- Discharge
  - average: 330 m^{3}/s (12,000 cu ft/s)

Map showing the Lake Champlain-River Richelieu watershed

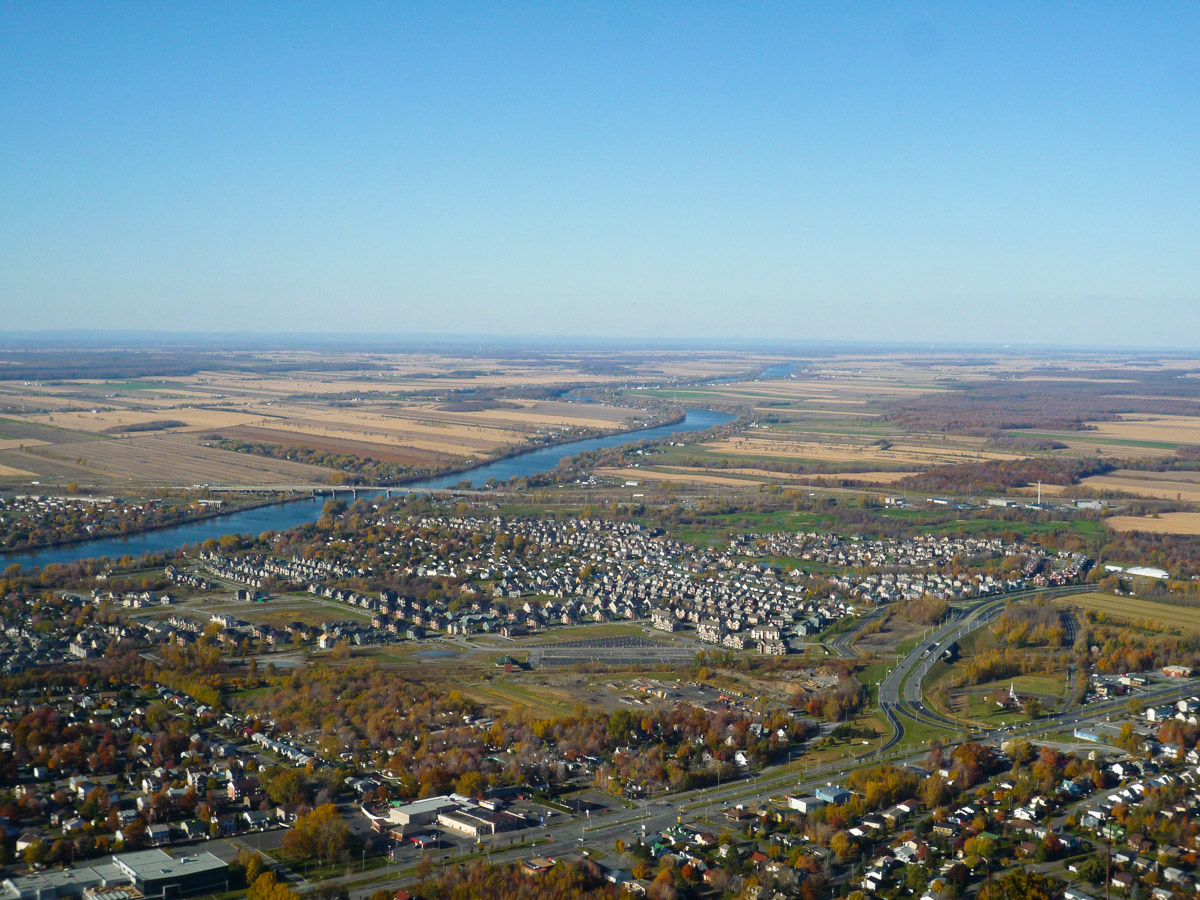
Part of the Richelieu River as seen from Mont Saint-Hilaire

The Richelieu River (French: [ʁiʃ(ə)ljø]) is a river of Quebec, Canada, and a major right-bank tributary of the St. Lawrence River. It rises at Lake Champlain, from which it flows northward through Quebec and empties into the St. Lawrence. It was formerly known by the French as the Iroquois River and the Chambly River, and was named for Cardinal Richelieu, the powerful minister under Louis XIII.

This river was a key route of water transport for trading, first by indigenous peoples, and then for cross-border trade between Canada and the United States. With 19th-century construction of the Champlain Canal (1823) south of Lake Champlain and the Chambly Canal (1843) to the north, the Richelieu provided a direct route from the Saint Lawrence River to New York via Lake Champlain, the canals, and the Hudson River. The construction of rail transport in the mid-19th century competed with such river/canal routes and ultimately succeeded them, because of faster service with greater freight capacity.

Because of the river's strategic position between New France and New England, several military fortifications were erected on its course. It served as a key pathway for several military tours and was the scene of several battles between the end of the 17th and early 19th centuries, first between the French and the Iroquois; then between the French and the English, during the regime of New France; and finally between the British and the rebel Americans after 1760.

== Geography and hydrography ==
The Richelieu River has a drainage basin of 23,720 square kilometres (9,160 mi^{2}) – including those of Lake Champlain 19,925 km^{2} (7,693 mi^{2}) and Missisquoi Bay (1,289 km^{2} (498 mi^{2})). Of this, 19,600 km^{2} (7,600 mi^{2}) are in the United States, originating in the western slopes of the Green Mountains and the eastern slopes of the Adirondack Mountains of New York State. The Champlain Valley makes up most of the drainage basin.

With a length of 124 km (77 mi), the Richelieu River takes its source at the north end of Lake Champlain, now on the border between Canada (Quebec) and the United States (Vermont and New York state). The river flows through many towns in Quebec: Lacolle, Île aux Noix, Saint-Jean-sur-Richelieu, Chambly, Beloeil, Saint-Charles-sur-Richelieu, Saint-Denis-sur-Richelieu, Saint-Ours and Sorel-Tracy, where the river empties into the Saint Lawrence River, around 40 km (25 mi) northeast of Montreal and southwest of Quebec City.

The Richelieu River is the largest tributary of the south or right shore of the Saint Lawrence River and drains a large area of southern Quebec. The Quebec portion of the watershed (about 15% of its total area) includes 18 lakes and ponds, as well as forty rivers and tributary streams of the Richelieu. The main Richelieu tributaries are rivers: Acadia, South Huron and Lacolle. The river's mean discharge is 330 cubic metres per second (12,000 cu ft/s).

Nearly 340,000 people across eight Regional county municipalities (RCM in English or MRC in French) and 65 municipalities, live in the Quebec portion of the watershed of the river. The population density (140 inhabitants per km^{2}) is very high compared to that of most other regions of the province of Quebec. Just over 70% of this area is used for agricultural purposes.

With the opening of the Chambly Canal in 1843, navigation became possible on the Richelieu between the Saint Lawrence River and Lake Champlain. At the southern end of the lake, New York had built the Champlain Canal (opened in 1823), which allows for navigation to the Hudson River and, downstream, the city of New York, a major market and port. There the Hudson flows into the Atlantic Ocean. It is a major international trading port.

Saint-Jean-sur-Richelieu, Chambly, Beloeil, Mont-Saint-Hilaire, and Sorel-Tracy are important communities on its route.

=== River course and hydrology ===
The average slope of the Richelieu River is 0.19 metres per kilometre (1.0 ft/mi), but 24 metres (79 ft) in elevation between Saint-Jean-sur-Richelieu and Chambly for an average flow of 330 cubic metres per second (12,000 ft^{3}/s).

By convention, the Richelieu is generally divided into three main sections:

- The Haut-Richelieu (upper Richelieu, between Lake Champlain and Saint-Jean-sur-Richelieu). It is characterized by a very low drop (0.3 m (0.98 ft) over 35 km (22 mi)). With a width of about 1.5 km (0.93 mi) at its southern end, it becomes increasingly narrow (width of about 250 m (820 ft) in its most narrow areas). It passes through the city of Saint-Jean-sur-Richelieu, which now includes Iberville and Saint-Luc (merged in 2001).
- The Chambly Canal (of Saint-Jean-sur-Richelieu to Chambly). Due to its significant drop in this area – 25 m (82 ft) over 12 km (7.5 mi) – the river has many rapids. The channel consists of nine locks and a length of nearly 19 km (12 mi), allowing boats to navigate past the rapids. In Chambly, the river widens and forms the Chambly Basin, a popular area for nautical activities.
- The Bas-Richelieu (lower Richelieu, between Chambly and the Saint Lawrence River). In this section, the river passes the cities of Otterburn Park, Beloeil, Mont-Saint-Hilaire and municipalities McMasterville, Saint-Charles-sur-Richelieu and Saint-Denis-sur-Richelieu. In Saint-Ours, the river is again characterized by a sudden drop before emptying into the Saint Lawrence River at Sorel-Tracy, southwest of Lake Saint-Pierre.

Several river islands are along the route of the Richelieu River. Arguably the most famous, Île aux Noix is in the Haut-Richelieu and houses Fort Lennox, considered a national historic site of Canada. Downstream, the Sainte-Thérèse Island near Saint-Jean-sur-Richelieu (in Saint-Luc's sector), is the largest island on the Richelieu (its length is about 4 km (2.5 mi) and a maximum width of 1 km (0.62 mi)). Formerly agricultural, it is now largely residential. It previously was the site of Fort Sainte Thérèse, built in 1665, but this was abandoned at the end of the 18th century and has now disappeared.

The Richelieu is one of three rivers flowing from Quebec south to north, the other two being the Châteauguay and Chaudière. Ice jams can form in the spring with the melting of ice in the south while the north is still frozen, causing floods.

=== Tributaries in Quebec part ===
1. Acadia River (Rivière l'Acadie), 82 km (51 mi) Mouth: Carignan.
2. River of the South (Rivière du Sud), 39.1 km (24.3 mi). Mouth: Henryville.
3. Amyot River (Rivière Amyot), 11.7 km (7.3 mi). Mouth: Saint-Charles-sur-Richelieu.
4. Lacolle River (Rivière Lacolle), 24 km (15 mi). Mouth: Lacolle.
5. Hurons River (Rivière des Hurons), 33 km (21 mi). Mouth: Saint-Mathias-sur-Richelieu.
6. Iroquois River (Rivière des Iroquois), 10.1 km (6.3 mi). Mouth: Saint-Jean-sur-Richelieu.
7. Bernier River (Rivière Bernier), 12.9 km (8.0 mi). Mouth: Saint-Jean-sur-Richelieu.
8. Massé Stream (Ruisseau Massé). Mouth: Carignan.
9. Bernard Stream East (Ruisseau Bernard). Mouth: Otterburn Park.
10. Bernard Stream West (Ruisseau Bernard). Mouth: McMasterville.
11. North Stream (Ruisseau Nord) in (Saint-Mathieu-de-Beloeil)
12. South Stream (Ruisseau Sud) in (Saint-Mathieu-de-Beloeil)

== Geology ==
The valley of the Richelieu river is based on sedimentary rocks formed during the Cambrian of the Paleozoic era around 450 million years ago. The bedrock consists of shale clay and sandstone. The shales are sedimentary rocks from the mechanical disintegration of preexisting rocks. The sandstones are composed of quartz grains joined together and are always the result of deposition of shoreline.

The Utica shale usually contain an abundance of mica flakes and important content of quartz. The Utica shale is especially conducive to shale gas exploitation. Those of Lorraine group are dark gray color, and contain also sandstone lenses up to 5 cm (2.0 in) thick. These are the rocks of the Lorraine Group (sub-formation Breault) that cover most of the area. This group (sub-formation Chambly) contains the younger sedimentary rocks of the region: a series of shales and "calcaireuses" that turn red in the upper parts.

Historically, the formation of rocks in the region is due to its immersion, towards the end of the Ordovician geological era, which led to the establishment of marine sediments. Then raised by tectonic forces, the entire region has been subjected to a long erosion since the end of the Ordovician to the late Tertiary. Subsequently, after being covered with a thick layer of ice during the Quaternary, the lowlands of the St. Lawrence was overwhelmed by the Champlain Sea in the wake of the collapse of the foundation underlying, therefore, the weight of glaciers. After dropping clays and sands, the sea had to decline, following the recovery of the base, and left the area in its current state.

The valley has a few pronounced relief that is covered with a large clay deposit of up to 50 metres (160 ft) thick. The lowlands were once part of plain of alluviums of St. Lawrence valley, greater than it is today. In a relatively recent geological time, glaciation changed the relief which subsequently was reduced by sediment deposits dating from the post-glacial of Champlain Sea. The most prominent of the watershed of the river geological formation is also formed by the Monteregian Hills. In addition, nearly half of the banks of the Richelieu River are kept in natural state.

Regarding the hydrogeology of the area, there are two major classes of surficial: permeable and little or no permeability. In the first case, we find sand and gravel formations for the establishment of wells that can theoretically power a community network or industry. In the second case, there are formation that permit at most the implementation of individual wells. A third category has emerged, that of permeable surficial buried underlying impermeable horizon, which are often highly productive aquifers. Permeable surficial sand and gravel together from various sources and represent 18 percent of the entire region. The little furniture or not permeable deposits consist of unconsolidated sediments which occupy 62 percent of the area. It includes the compact clay or silty matrix till, glaciolacustrine sediments for the Champlain Sea clay, fine current and organic sediment floodplain sediments.

== History ==
Indigenous occupation

The Richelieu River was territory of the Iroquois and Abenaki, confederacies whose peoples were primarily based to the west and south, and the east and north, respectively.

French explorers

In 1535, the French explorer Jacques Cartier discovered the mouth of Richelieu River, during his second voyage in New France (Canada). Samuel de Champlain and his team reached the mouth of the river in 1603. Champlain returned to the river in 1608 and in 1609, exploring upriver and through Lake Champlain to modern-day Albany, New York.

Toponymy

The river was formerly known as "Masoliantekw", which means "water where there is plenty of food" in Abenaki. Because of their encounters with the Iroquois nations along this way, the French called it the Riviere Iroquois at the beginning of the colony. Some early journals and maps refer to the lower river as the Sorel River. It was named for the powerful Cardinal Richelieu (1585–1642), Minister of Louis XIII, who is also the namesake of Fort Richelieu. Cardinal Richelieu's tenure as chief minister coincided with much of the early period of the permanent French settlement of the Quebec region of New France in the first half of the 17th century.

Five forts

Already an important pathway for the Iroquois, particularly the easternmost nation of the Mohawk, the Richelieu River soon became one for French traders as well. The French regime built five forts along its length: Fort Richelieu at its mouth, Fort St. Louis (or Fort Chambly) in Chambly, Fort Sainte Thérèse and Fort Saint-Jean upriver, and Fort Ste. Anne on the Isle La Motte, Vermont, in Lake Champlain near its source.

In the 17th century, the repeated attacks by the Iroquois endangered the existence of New France. The colonists built their first military posts: Fort Richelieu in Sorel and Fort Saint-Jean. The latter, built in 1666, became the developing center of the city of Saint-Jean, today Saint-Jean-sur-Richelieu.

In the 18th century, the region was a strategic location increasingly coveted by both the French and British colonial empires. The two powers wanted to expand their territory and control the lucrative fur trade. After defeating France in the Seven Years' War (known as the French and Indian War in North America), Great Britain took over its territory of New France east of the Mississippi River in 1763.

Between 1819 and 1829, the British built Fort Lennox on an island of the Richelieu River, near the Canada-U.S. border, to prevent against possible attacks from Americans, whom they had fought during the War of 1812. The British and French built large fortified posts, as shown by Fort Lennox at Île aux Noix, Fort Sainte Thérèse, and Fort St. Louis (or Fort Chambly).

The security offered by the forts and the fertile lands of the river attracted farmers. In the early nineteenth century the region of Haut-Richelieu got its nickname, the "Valley of the strongholds" (Vallée des forts).

After the period of the British conquest of New France in 1759–1760, and after the American War of Independence by the Thirteen Colonies (1776–1783), the Crown offered British military and Loyalists land for their service and in compensation for losses in what was now the United States. Numerous new settlers chose the banks of the Richelieu. During the Lower Canada Rebellion of 1837, the battles of Saint-Denis and Saint-Charles occurred along the Richelieu.

Economy

During the 19th century, the Richelieu became an important economic thoroughfare instead of a path for war. In 1843, the construction of the Chambly Canal was completed, bypassing the rapids and allowing easier transportation of export products such as sawlogs, pulp, hay, and coal from Canada to the United States. Following the first channel, a network of channels was formed. These allowed those traversing the Richelieu to access the Hudson River and then New York. Sorel and Saint-Jean-sur-Richelieu, which were both incorporated in the 1850s, arose as a direct result of the increased traffic on the Richelieu.

Railroad development

However, by the end of the 19th century railroads had largely replaced the river as commercial arteries. A tragic intersection of the two modes of transport occurred in 1864 when a train plunged off a swing bridge into the river after missing a red signal, killing 99 people.

Tourist industry

Tourists visit New York and Montreal through the river. Its contribution to regional prosperity is crucial and, in the middle of the century, Saint-Jean became the most important inner harbour of Quebec and Canada. The resort has largely replaced the business generated by the Richelieu which is considered a "heritage corridor".

The river, which crosses densely populated areas as well as several agricultural areas is ecologically challenged, especially in the Chambly Basin. Measures concerning wastewater treatment reduced the presence of certain pollutants in recent years.

The Richelieu River caused extensive flooding during the spring of 2011, damaging or destroying more than 3,000 homes in Quebec and at least 750 in Vermont.

== Gallery of old images ==
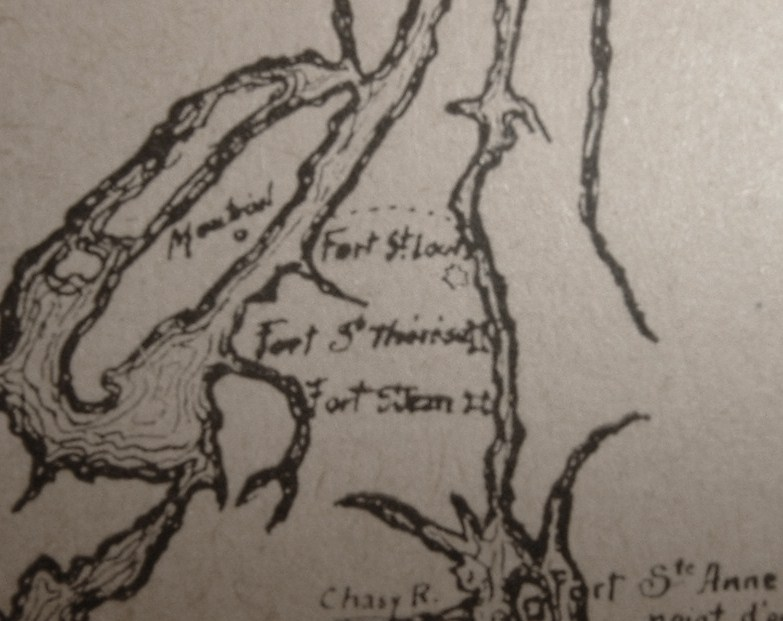
Map of Fort Saint-Jean and other forts on the Richelieu River c. 1666 for the campagne of the Regiment of Carignan-Salières

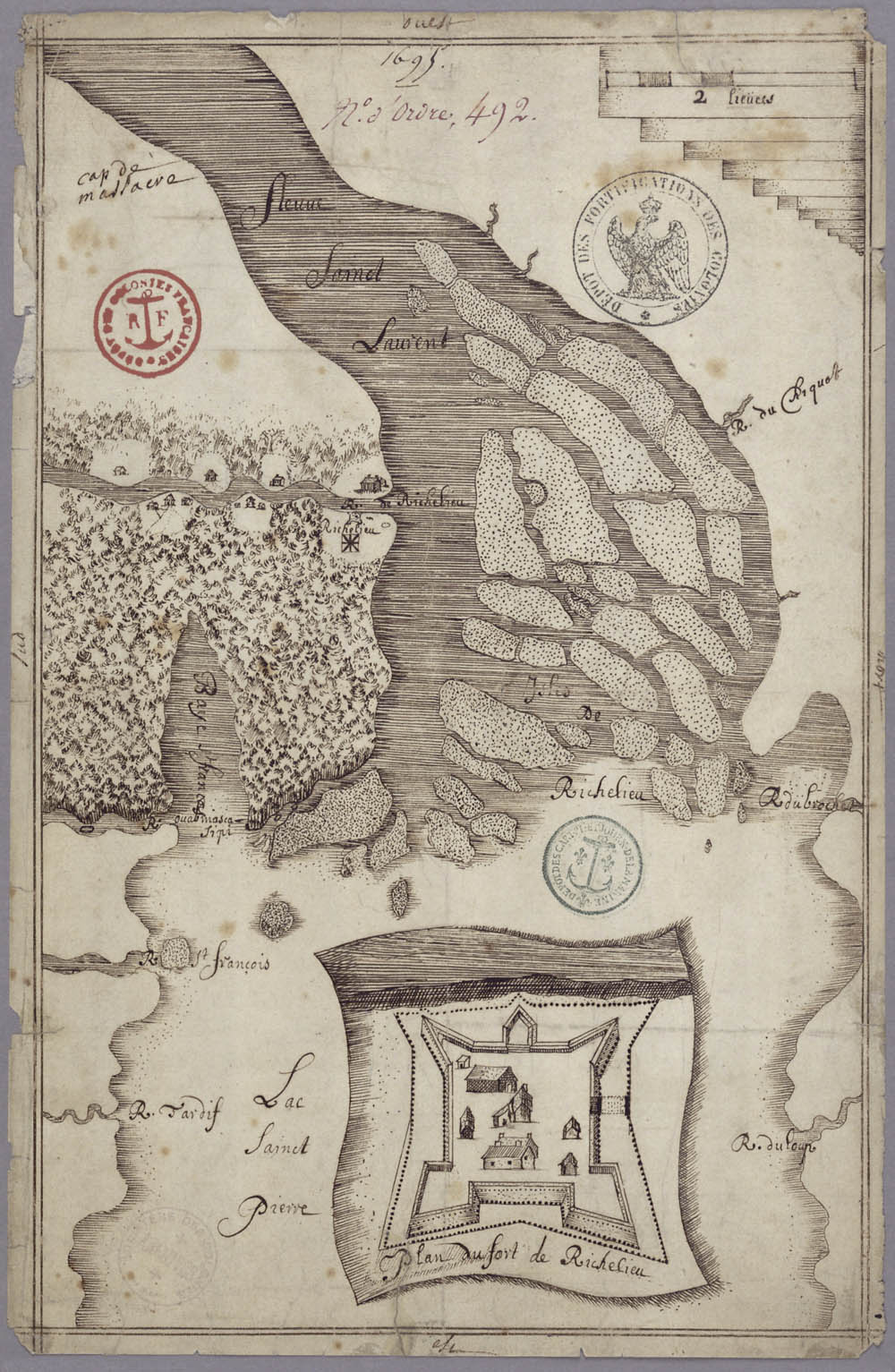
Map of 1695 with a plan of Fort Richelieu

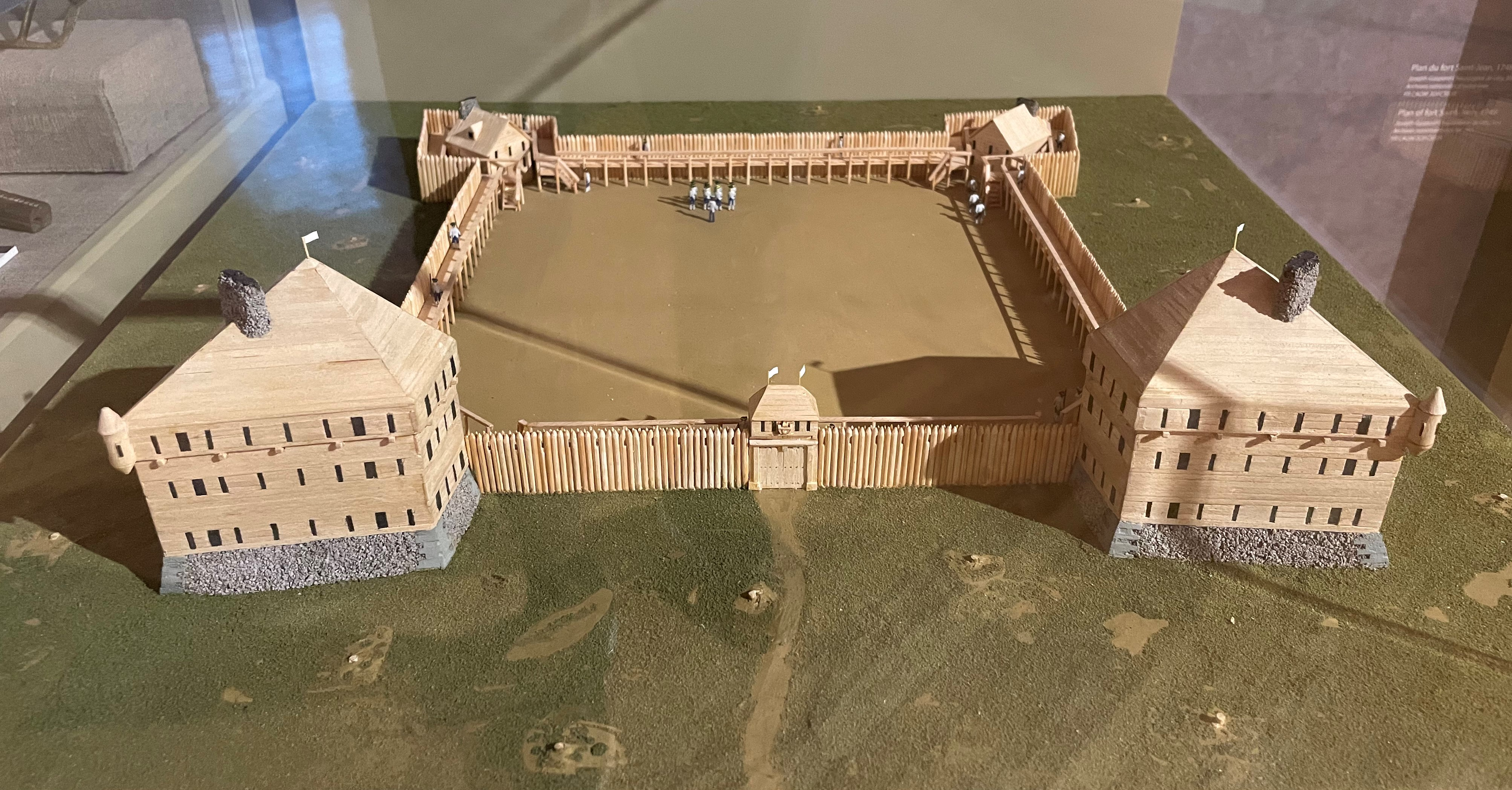
Fort Saint-Jean c1748

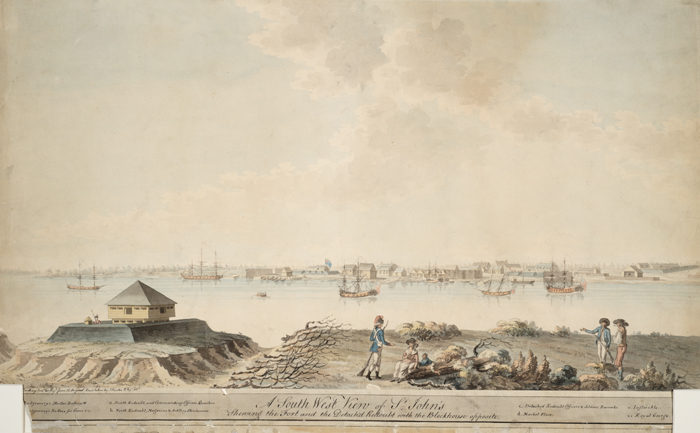
Fort Saint-Jean c. 1775 siege of the fort

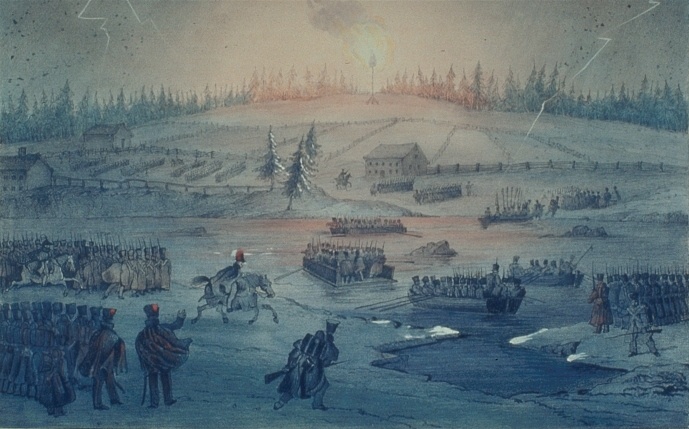
Passage of the Richelieu by night

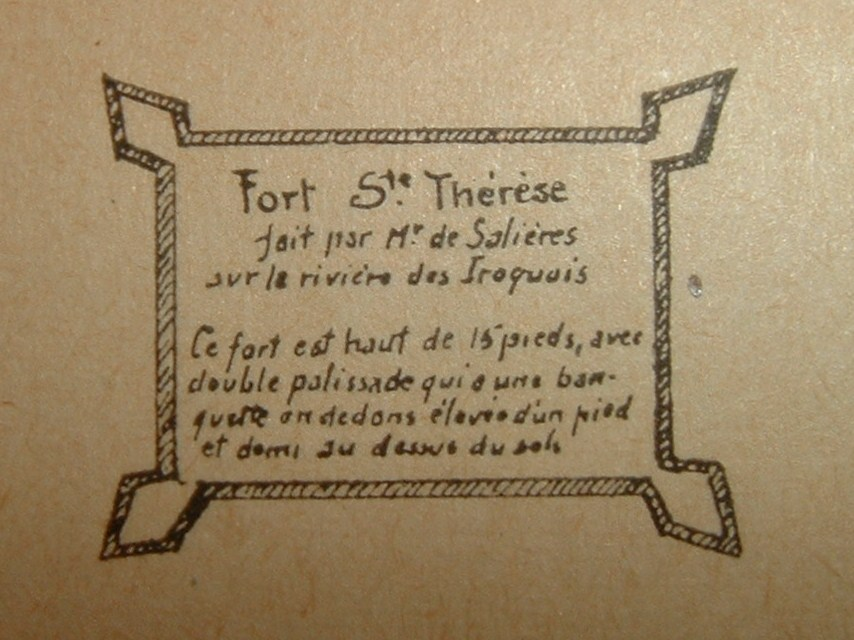
Fort Sainte-Thérèse on Richelieu River

== Recreation ==
Although its commercial significance has waned, the Richelieu has remained an important recreational waterway. The Chambly Canal (9 locks) permits pleasure boats to bypass the rapids at Saint-Jean-sur-Richelieu and Chambly. The Champlain Canal and Lake Champlain form the U.S. portion of the Lakes to Locks Passage, linking with the Hudson River and allowing navigation using the Richelieu between the St. Lawrence River and New York City and the Erie Canal.

The Piste cyclable du Canal-de-Chambly is a 20 km (12 mi) bicycle path that follows the towpath along the canal. The bike path is part of Quebec's Route Verte bicycle path network. The canal is a national historic site operated by Parks Canada. The agency also manages other national historic sites along the river: Fort Chambly, Fort Ste. Thérèse, and St. Ours Canal.

Given the rich historical past of the region, the Richelieu River brings in its banks and its islands several sites, some of which are owned by Parks Canada National Historic Site Canal Chambly National Historic Site the Fort Lennox, the Fort Saint-Jean.

Fishing

The Richelieu, which is home to more than 50 species of fish, offers excellent sport fishing opportunities. Important sport species include northern pike, longnose gar, bowfin, smallmouth bass, largemouth bass, carp, and black crappie. But the Richelieu also hosts several threatened or endangered species, such as the copper redhorse, river redhorse, and lake sturgeon, so fishing seasons and capture limits are regulated.

Due to the esteemed reputation of agricultural products in the Montérégie, many restaurateurs settle near the Richelieu River to combine fine dining and picturesque landscape. As a result, maple and apple cider and sugar shacks are prevalent in the area.

== Hinterland ==
In urban and agricultural areas, there are mainly small mammals such as skunks, raccoon, squirrel and marmots. Forest areas, which represent 16% of the land in the watershed, host a variety of wildlife: there are among others American mink, deer, beaver, frogs and several species of turtles including the softshell turtle, which is an endangered species.

But the wildlife species most frequently sighted are birds. Because the river flows in a north-south axis, it is a migration corridor and one can observe several migrating birds. A staging area is located near Saint-Jean-sur-Richelieu, and depending on the time of year, birdswatchers can see various species of birds. For example, in the fall, visitors can see the arrival of thousands of geese and ducks. One can also see the loggerhead shrike (an endangered species), as well as the peregrine and golden eagle (classified as a vulnerable species), and cerulean warblers, to name but a few.

Regarding the flora, the catchment of the River belongs to the bioclimatic domain maple-hickory hickory. It includes among others sugar maple and silver maple of hickory hickory of bur oak and oak bicolor of American elms and black ash, and several bushes and herbaceous. Of these, several are considered vulnerable or endangered. This is the case of the aplectrelle winter (Aplectrum hyemale), the leek (Allium tricoccum) and Canada lily (Lilium canadense).

In the late 1990s, there was the presence of water chestnut at the mouth of the river. This invasive species threaten to stifle the fauna and flora, as it multiplies at lightning speed. The Ministry of Sustainable Development, Environment and Parks of Quebec struggle to get rid of, and indeed a breakout campaign began in 2001. Partners, such as CIME Haut-Richelieu has controlled the invasion of this plant in the harvesting.

=== Fish ===
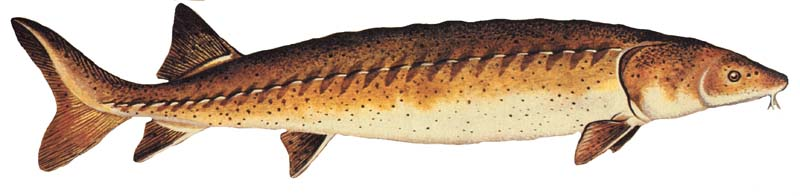
The sturgeon

The Richelieu River is home to more than fifty species of fish. Many of them are considered threatened or endangered as copper redhorse, river redhorse and sturgeon. One of the last spawning of copper redhorse (Moxostoma hubbsi), a species endemic in Quebec is also found in the river. Other species, such as goby, are exogenous. In fact, they come from an external medium and were accidentally introduced into the ecosystem, often water discharge ballast vessels that ply the St. Lawrence River. Considered harmful or invasive, they colonize the water, funds and compete with native species (local) and a threat to the integrity of the ecosystem river.

During the last decade, several methods have been implemented to protect endangered species. These projects include 2001, the fish ladder Vianney-Legendre which was built to help fish to pass the dam canal Saint-Ours. Named to honor the memory of Vianney-Legendre, renowned ichthyologist, the structure of an innovative nature has been designed to accommodate different species of fish, especially those threatened. This scale can even be used to raise awareness of the endangered species recovery. In 2002, the wildlife refuge Pierre-Étienne Fortin (naturalist who first described the copper redhorse) was created to protect a breeding copper redhorse. Access to the refuge is prohibited during the breeding season which runs from late June to late July. Finally, every summer since 2006, as part of a patrol project established by the Committee for consultation and development of the basin of the River (COVABAR) sensitizing agents plying the river in order to inform boaters the precarious situation of the copper redhorse and remind them regulations and measures in place to protect her.

In addition, invasive species and increasing human presence are not only responsible for the fragility of some populations. According to a report from the Quebec Ministry of Sustainable Development, Environment and Parks (MDDEP) conducted in 1998, the presence of pollutants and toxic agents in the waters of the river is also a "stressful" for fish. In several places in the river, a disturbing proportion of fish (over 13%) had abnormalities, which would signal a "precarious state of health" of the community ichthyological. However, the significant presence of fish-eating fish and some vulnerable species such as banded killifish, brought MDDEP to maintain the integrity index fish "average" (except in the Saint-Jean-sur-Richelieu, where he was considered "low"). Chub black chin, stonecat and lamprey East are also part of sentinel species in the watershed of the Richelieu River, like copper redhorse, whose presence is an indication of the quality of water and aquatic. The data presented in the 1998 report are still used as a reference in 2011.

The fragility of some ecosystems does not preclude the practice of sports and leisure activities. Some fish from the river can reach impressive and relevant to angling sizes. This activity is regulated, however : regular and sectoral restrictions and daily bag limits may apply between other sturgeons, the knights, millers and striped bass.

== See also ==
Media related to Category: Richelieu River at Wikimedia Commons

- Missisquoi River
- Rivière-aux-Brochets Ecological Reserve
- Bassin-de-Chambly
- Ile aux Noix
- Demers Island
- Île aux Lièvres
- Goyer Island
- List of Quebec rivers
- List of crossings of the Richelieu River
- Lake Champlain Seaway
- 2011 Lake Champlain and Richelieu River Floods
