= Notre-Dame-du-Mont-Carmel, Lacolle, Quebec =

Coordinates: 45°4′3″N 73°20′36″W

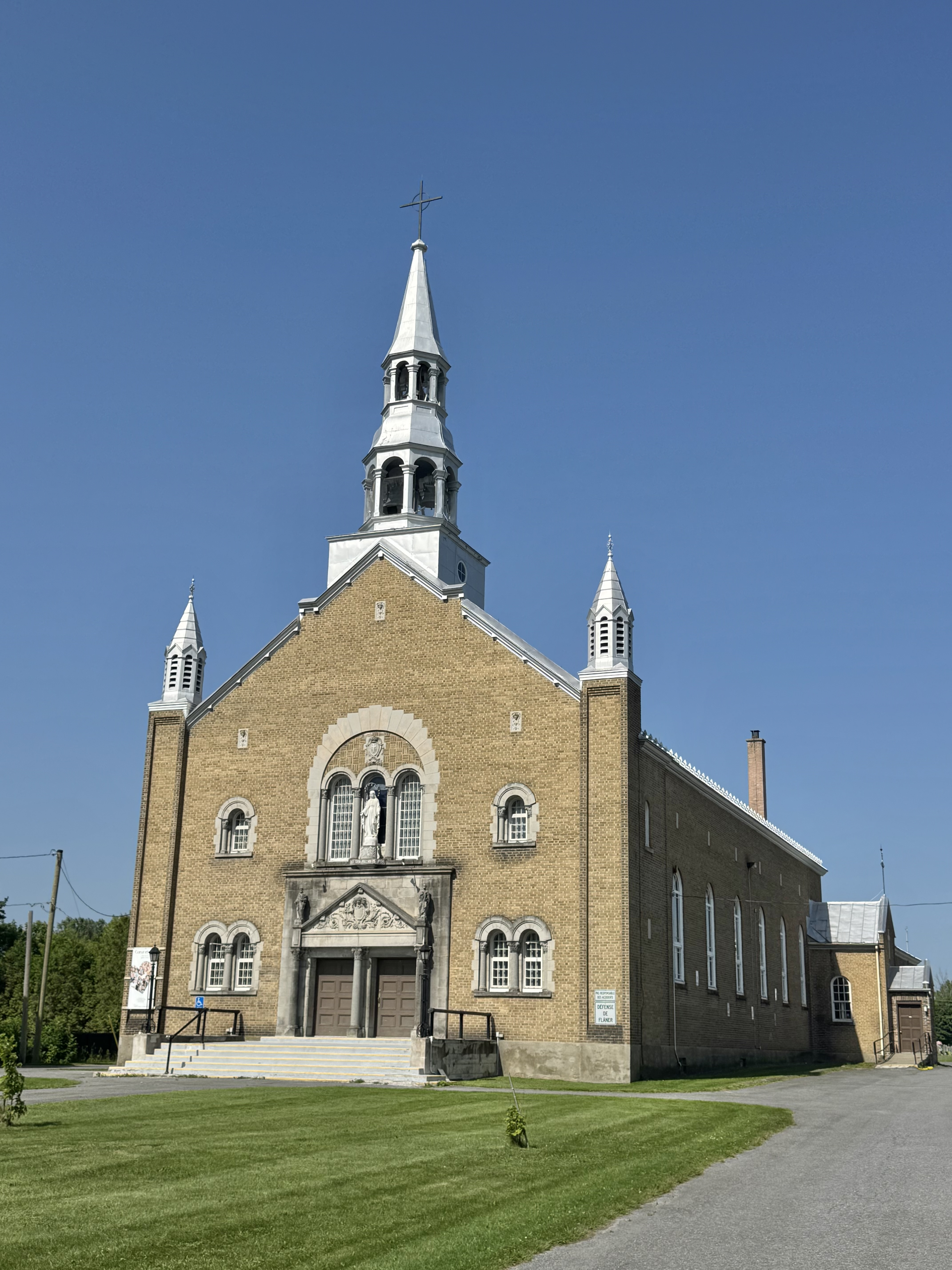
Église Notre-Dame-du-Mont-Carmel à Lacolle

Notre-Dame-du-Mont-Carmel (French pronunciation: [nɔtʁə dam dy mɔ̃ kaʁmɛl]) was a former parish municipality in Le Haut-Richelieu Regional County Municipality in the Montérégie region of Quebec. On September 13, 2001, it ceased to exist and merged with the village municipality of Lacolle to form the new municipality of Lacolle.

== Education ==
The South Shore Protestant Regional School Board previously served the municipality.
