= Fort Lennox =

Building in Quebec, Canada

Coordinates: 45.1207°N 73.2682°W

- Île aux Noix, Quebec, Canada
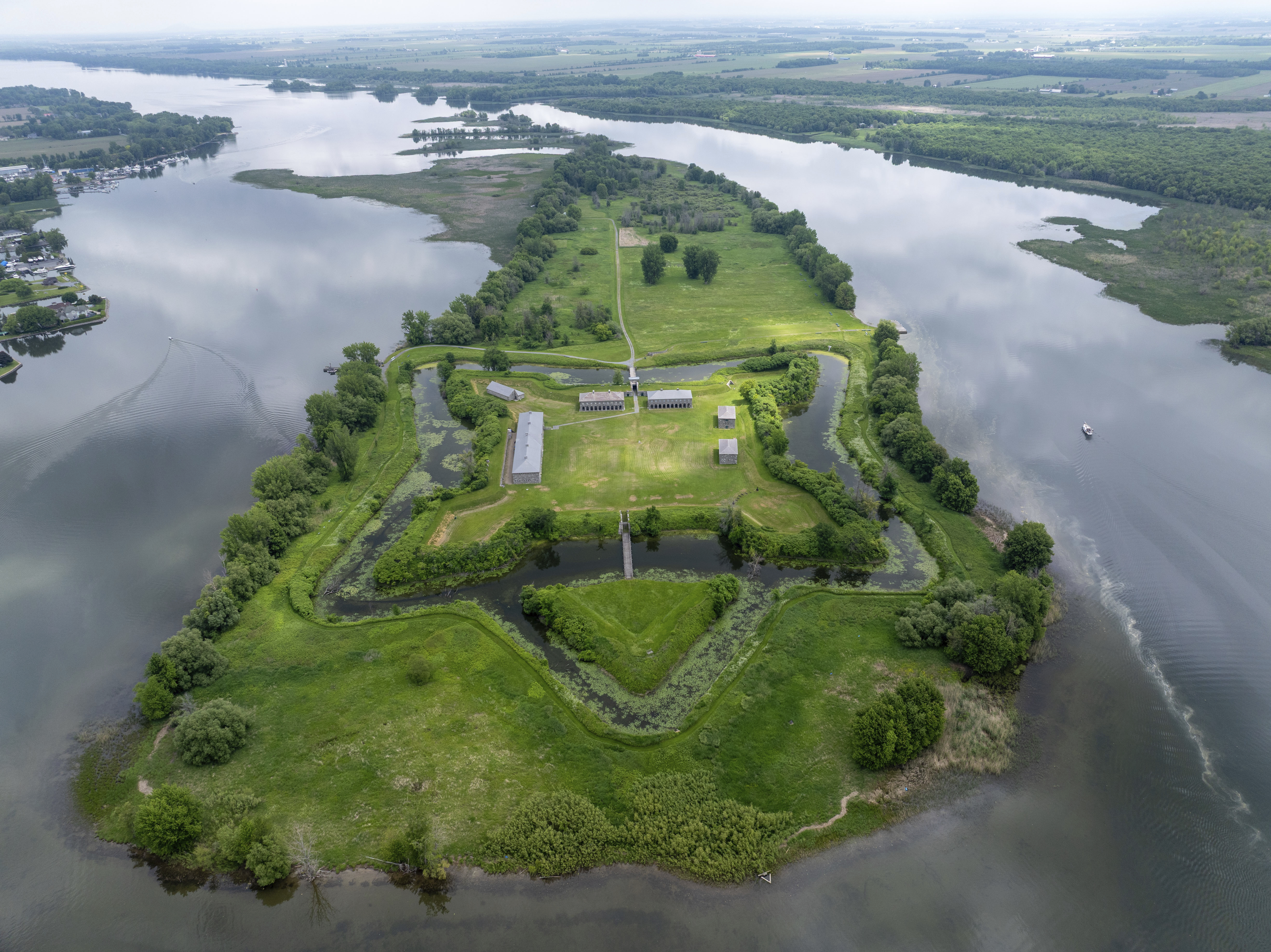
- Fort Lennox in 2026

Site history
- Built: 1819–1829

National Historic Site of Canada
- Official name: Fort Lennox National Historic Site
- Designated: 1920

Fort Lennox is a National Historic Site of Canada occupying most of Île aux Noix, an island in the middle of the Richelieu River in the parish of Saint-Paul-de-l'Île-aux-Noix, Quebec, near the Canada-U.S. border. The fort features restored defence works and stonework buildings, and is surrounded by a star-shaped moat. It is owned by the Government of Canada and managed by Parks Canada

The site of Fort Lennox was a strategic location in defending Canada against invasion from the south during colonial times. It was first fortified by the French in 1759 to defend against British invasion during the French and Indian War and the current buildings were built by the British between 1819 and 1829 to deter a U.S. invasion after the War of 1812. In 1920, it was designated a National Historic Site of Canada. and is administered by Parks Canada.

As of December 2022, the Fort was still undergoing renovation work and closed to the public. It reopened to the public in spring 2023 with a new exhibition, presenting the different passages on the island, in the barracks.

== History ==
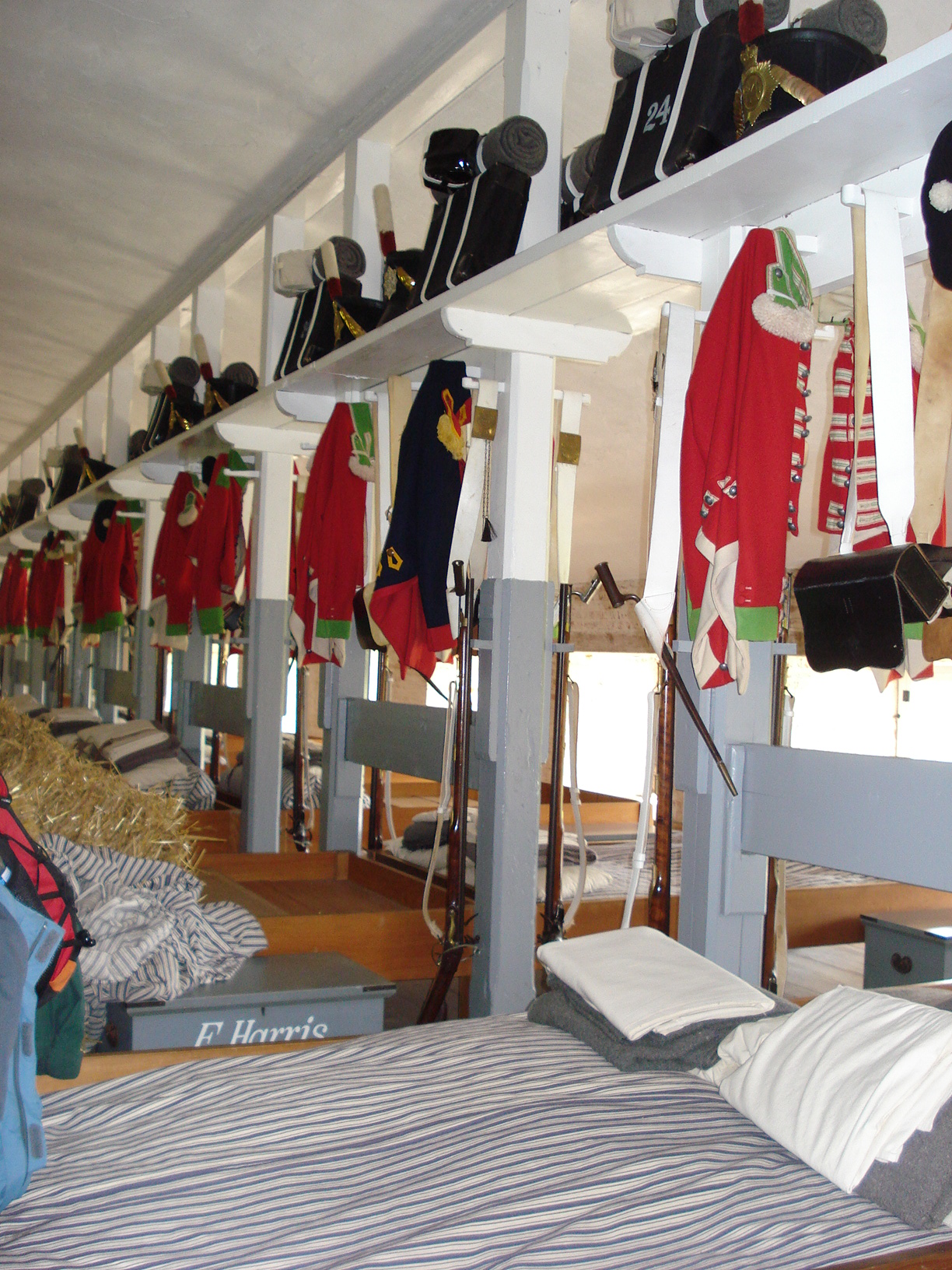
Enlisted men's quarters

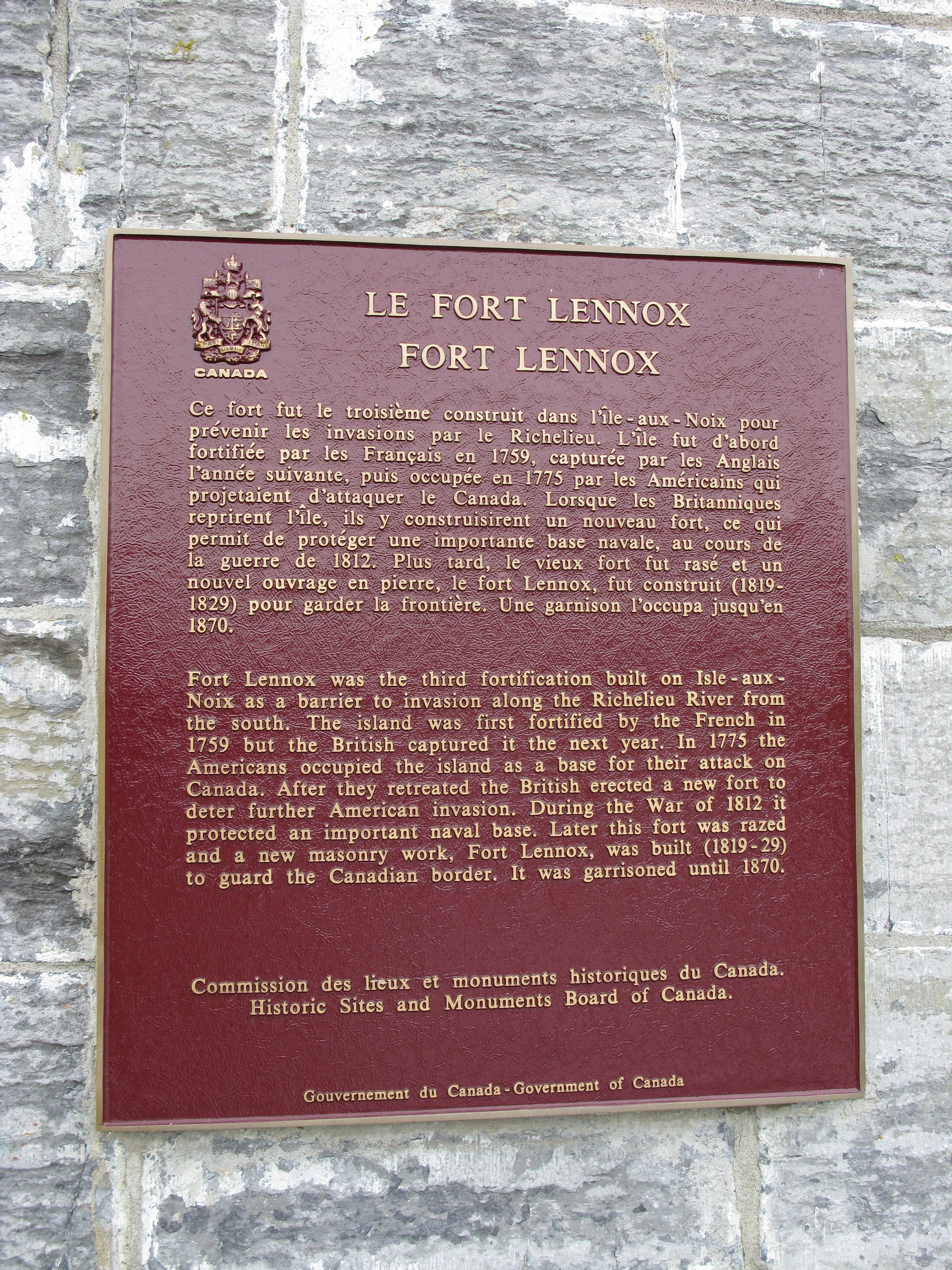
Plaque at the entrance of Fort Lennox

Built by the British between 1819 and 1829, the fort was designed to protect the colony from possible American invasion. The fort was named after Charles Lennox, 4th Duke of Richmond, who died in 1819 and was Governor General of British North America. An earlier 1760s fort on the same site was originally built by the French during the Seven Years' War.

On 28 June 1985 Canada Post issued 'Fort Lennox, Que.' one of the 20 stamps in the "Forts Across Canada Series" (1983 & 1985). The stamps are perforated 12 1/2 x 13 mm and were printed by Ashton-Potter Limited based on the designs by Rolf P. Harder.

== Museum ==
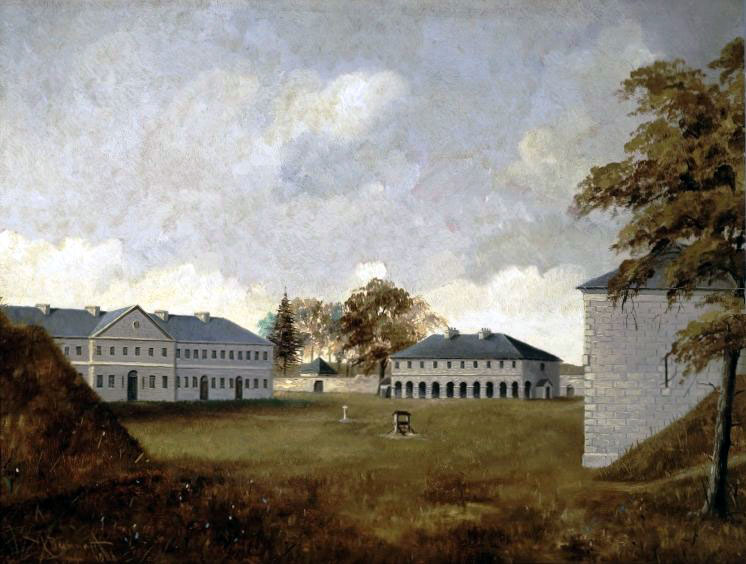
Painting of Fort Lennox, 1886, by Henry Richard S. Bunnett

An exhibit has been presented to the public in the newly renovated barracks. By the name of Passages, experiences of this Island, the exhibition split in twelve alcoves presents the multiple passages on the island.

Visitors can tour the 1820s period officers' quarters during a tour given by Parks Canada's guide. The north and south magazine are now closed to the public.

Guided tours are given of the grounds and buildings, which include an ordnance magazine and artillery magazine, a guardhouse, officers' quarters, barracks and casemates. During summer weekends, living history demonstrations focus on fort life in the mid 19th century.

There is the possibility to see a demonstration of a typical 24th British Infantry Regiment soldier uniform. It is given in the barracks on the first floor. After the demonstration, it is highly recommended to go upstairs to see the dormitory exhibit.

== Entry ==
The admission fees to the island includes the ferry. The parking lot and visitor center are located on the west shore of the river. Boaters cannot visit the island directly. They need to pay a fee to enter the fort by going to the visitor center on the west shore.
