= Saint-Jean-sur-Richelieu =

- City
- Ville de Saint-Jean-sur-Richelieu
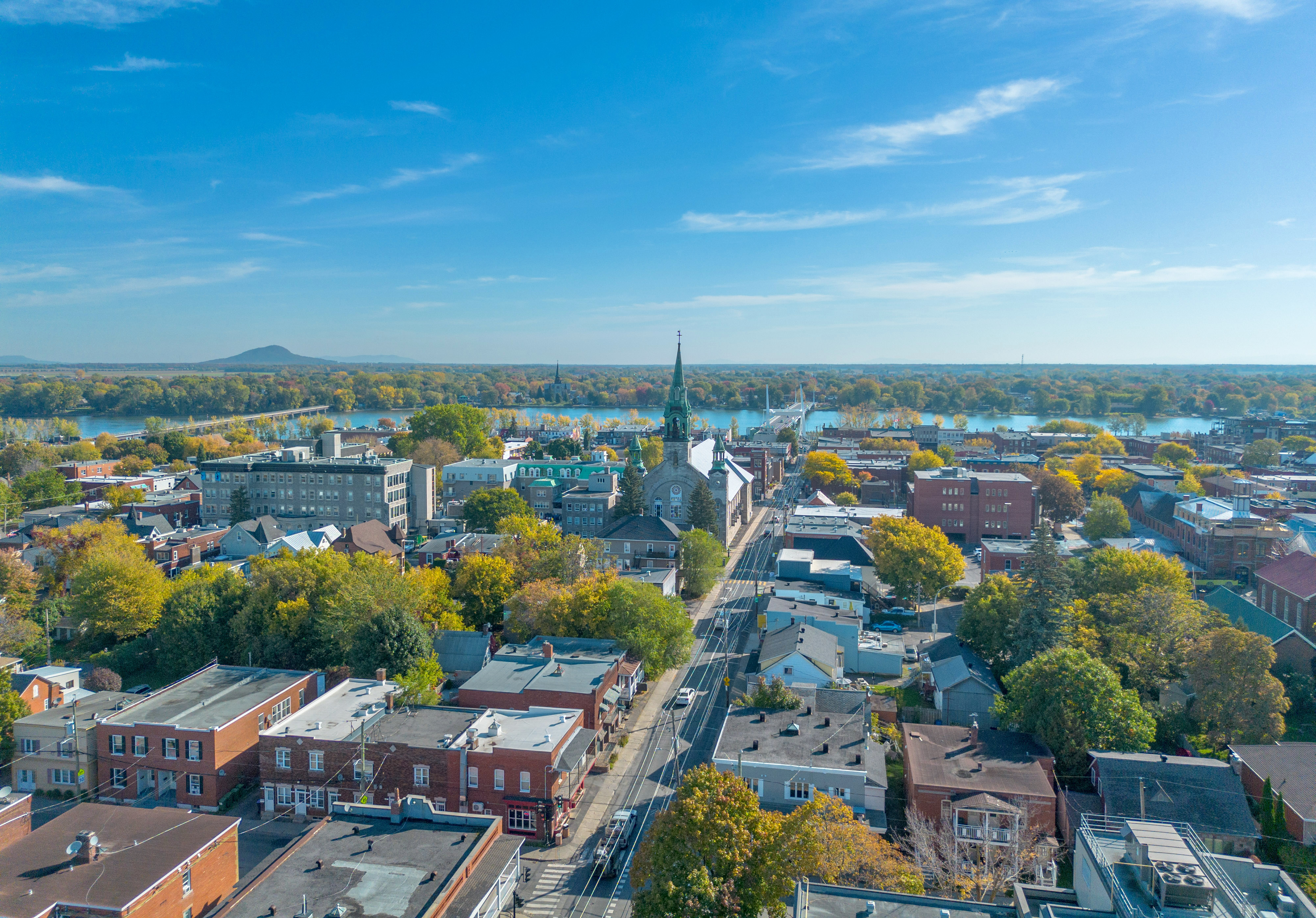
- Saint Jean sur Richelieu in 2025

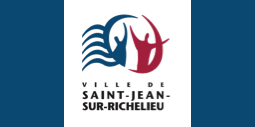
- Flag Logo
- Motto: L'industrie, la culture, l'avenir
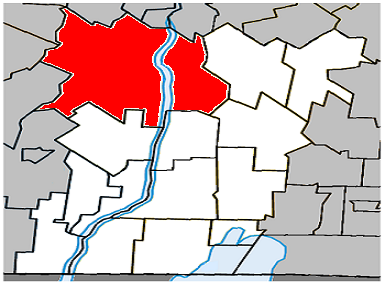
- Location within Le Haut-Richelieu RCM

- Location in southern Quebec
- Coordinates: 45°19′N 73°16′W
- Country: Canada
- Province: Quebec
- Region: Montérégie
- RCM: Le Haut-Richelieu
- Settled: 1665
- Constituted: January 24, 2001

Government
  - Mayor: Éric Latour
  - Federal riding: Saint-Jean
  - Prov. riding: Iberville and Saint-Jean

Area
  - City: 233.75 km^{2} (90.25 sq mi)
  - Land: 226.93 km^{2} (87.62 sq mi)
  - Urban: 53.80 km^{2} (20.77 sq mi)

Population (2021)
  - City: 97,873
  - Density: 431.3/km^{2} (1,117/sq mi)
  - Urban: 88,083
  - Urban density: 1,637.3/km^{2} (4,241/sq mi)
- ▲2.9%
  - Dwellings: 44,255
- Time zone: UTC−5 (EST)
  - Summer (DST): UTC−4 (EDT)
- Postal code(s): J0J1R0, J2W, J2X, J2Y, J3A, J3B
- Area codes: 450 and 579
- Website: www.ville.saint-jean -sur-richelieu.qc.ca www.sjsr.ca

Saint-Jean-sur-Richelieu (French pronunciation: [sɛ̃ ʒɑ̃ syʁ ʁiʃ(ə)ljø], lit. 'Saint-Jean on Richelieu') is a city in eastern Montérégie in the Canadian province of Quebec, about 40 kilometres (25 mi) southeast of Montreal, roughly halfway between Montreal and the Canada–United States border with the state of Vermont. It straddles the west and east banks of the Richelieu River (which is accompanied by a canal) at the northernmost navigable point of Lake Champlain. As of December 2019, the population was 98,036. The city has experienced steady growth, up from the official 2021 Census count of 97,873 residents. It hosts the annual International Balloon Festival of Saint-Jean-sur-Richelieu, a hot air balloon festival which attracts thousands of tourists.

== History ==
Historically, the city has been an important transportation hub. The first railway line in British North America connected it with La Prairie in 1836. It hosts the annual International Balloon Festival of Saint-Jean-sur-Richelieu, a hot air balloon festival which attracts thousands of tourists who come to see the hundreds of balloons in the sky each August.

The Chambly Canal extends 20 kilometres (12 mi) north along the west bank of the river and provides modern freight passage to Chambly and the St. Lawrence River. The canal has one lock near the downtown of Saint-Jean-sur-Richelieu. In the winter, the city builds a skating rink on the canal near the lock. In the summer, the embankment on the east side of the canal has a 20-kilometre (12 mi) cycling path.

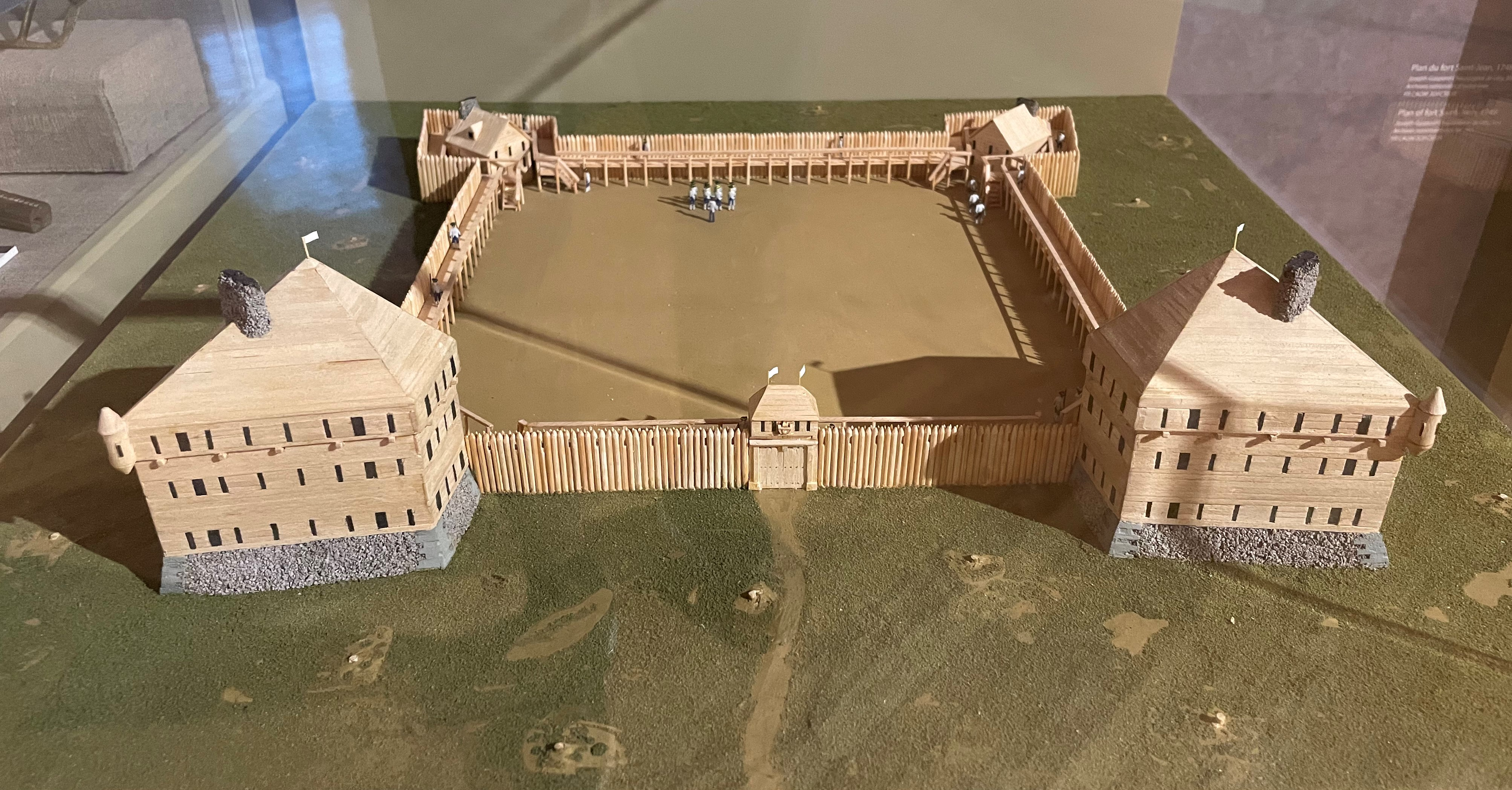
Plan of Fort Saint-Jean during the year 1748

The French built Fort Saint-Jean in the seventeenth century. Known to early English settlers as St. Johns, it provided an important communication link during the Seven Years' War. During the American Revolutionary War control of the town changed hands several times as British and American forces moved through the area.

In 2001, the city and several adjoining communities were merged into the new regional county municipality with a population to 79,600. This merger was requested by the five municipalities involved and was not part of the municipal fusions imposed by the Quebec government the following year.

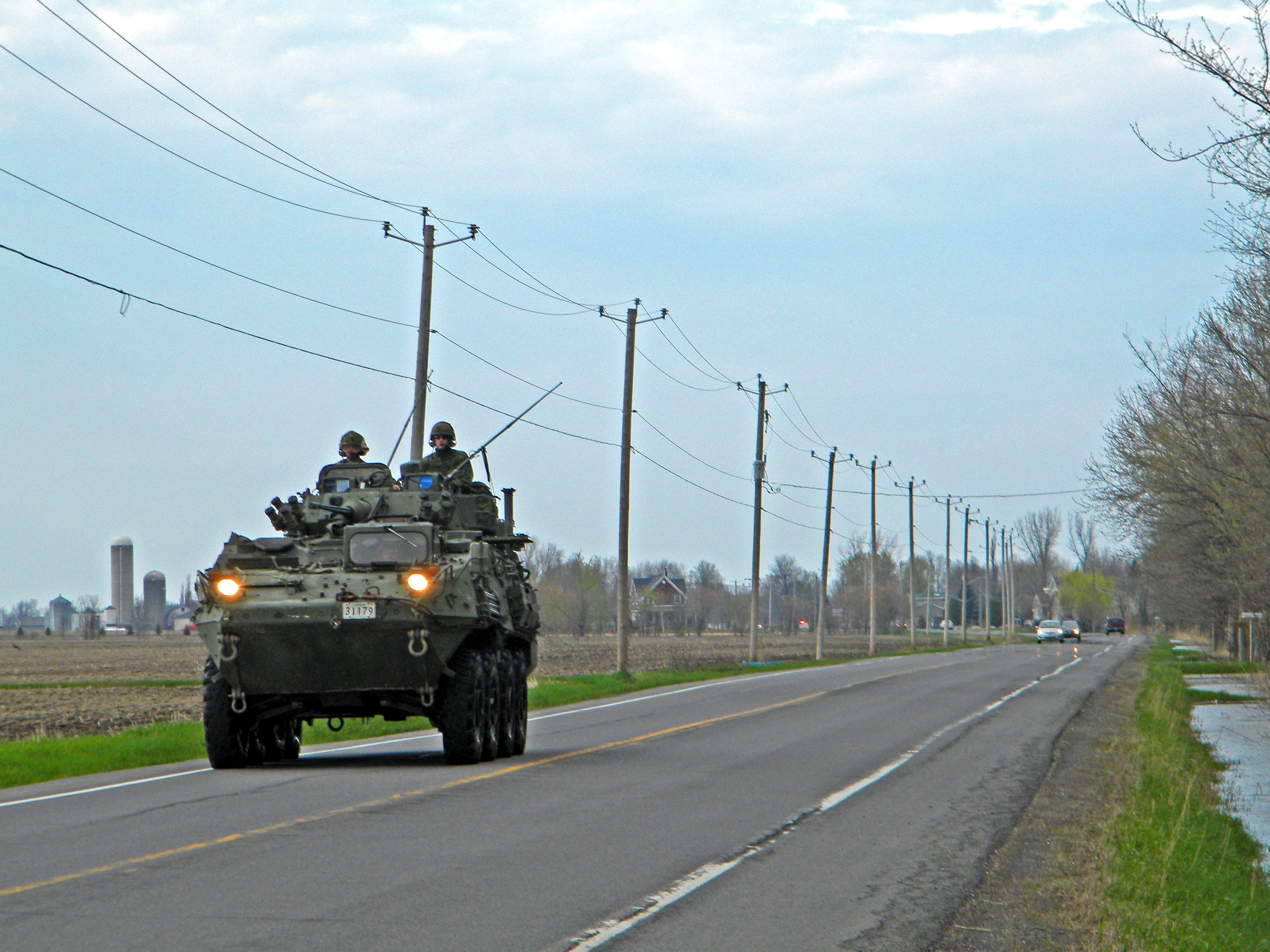
A LAV III in Saint-Jean-sur-Richelieu during the 2011 floods.

== Geography ==
Saint-Jean-sur-Richelieu straddles the banks of the Richelieu River. The city is the seat of Le Haut-Richelieu regional county municipality and of the judicial district of Iberville.

=== Climate ===
Climate data for Saint-Jean-sur-Richelieu (Iberville) (1981–2010 normals, extremes 1956–present)
Month	Jan	Feb	Mar	Apr	May	Jun	Jul	Aug	Sep	Oct	Nov	Dec	Year
Record high °C (°F)	14.3 (57.7)	16.1 (61.0)	25.4 (77.7)	30.7 (87.3)	36.1 (97.0)	35.7 (96.3)	35.2 (95.4)	35.6 (96.1)	34.2 (93.6)	29.1 (84.4)	22.3 (72.1)	17.3 (63.1)	36.1 (97.0)
Mean daily maximum °C (°F)	−5.0 (23.0)	−3.0 (26.6)	2.6 (36.7)	11.3 (52.3)	18.7 (65.7)	24.0 (75.2)	26.3 (79.3)	25.2 (77.4)	20.6 (69.1)	13.0 (55.4)	5.8 (42.4)	−1.1 (30.0)	11.5 (52.7)
Daily mean °C (°F)	−9.7 (14.5)	−7.9 (17.8)	−2.1 (28.2)	6.2 (43.2)	13.0 (55.4)	18.5 (65.3)	20.9 (69.6)	19.8 (67.6)	15.3 (59.5)	8.6 (47.5)	2.2 (36.0)	−5.1 (22.8)	6.6 (43.9)
Mean daily minimum °C (°F)	−14.4 (6.1)	−12.8 (9.0)	−6.9 (19.6)	1.1 (34.0)	7.2 (45.0)	12.9 (55.2)	15.5 (59.9)	14.3 (57.7)	10.0 (50.0)	4.1 (39.4)	−1.5 (29.3)	−9.1 (15.6)	1.7 (35.1)
Record low °C (°F)	−39.0 (−38.2)	−40.0 (−40.0)	−33.0 (−27.4)	−14.1 (6.6)	−4.4 (24.1)	1.5 (34.7)	2.5 (36.5)	2.0 (35.6)	−4.5 (23.9)	−7.1 (19.2)	−21.1 (−6.0)	−32.5 (−26.5)	−40.0 (−40.0)
Average precipitation mm (inches)	81.6 (3.21)	66.3 (2.61)	71.6 (2.82)	90.8 (3.57)	99.2 (3.91)	97.5 (3.84)	111.3 (4.38)	103.1 (4.06)	95.2 (3.75)	103.6 (4.08)	102.8 (4.05)	88.9 (3.50)	1,111.9 (43.78)
Average rainfall mm (inches)	34.8 (1.37)	24.6 (0.97)	42.7 (1.68)	82.7 (3.26)	99.2 (3.91)	97.5 (3.84)	111.3 (4.38)	103.1 (4.06)	95.2 (3.75)	102.3 (4.03)	91.9 (3.62)	43.0 (1.69)	928.3 (36.55)
Average snowfall cm (inches)	46.8 (18.4)	41.7 (16.4)	29.0 (11.4)	8.4 (3.3)	0.0 (0.0)	0.0 (0.0)	0.0 (0.0)	0.0 (0.0)	0.0 (0.0)	1.3 (0.5)	10.9 (4.3)	45.9 (18.1)	183.9 (72.4)
Average precipitation days (≥ 0.2 mm)	13.8	11.6	11.6	12.0	13.9	13.0	12.8	11.7	11.4	12.3	13.7	14.0	151.8
Average rainy days (≥ 0.2 mm)	4.0	3.8	6.9	11.5	13.8	13.0	12.8	11.7	11.4	12.2	12.2	6.0	119.4
Average snowy days (≥ 0.2 cm)	10.7	8.7	6.1	1.6	0.0	0.0	0.0	0.0	0.03	0.34	3.0	9.2	39.6
Source: Environment Canada

=== Neighbourhoods ===
The city is divided in five sectors which refer to the former municipalities. Each sector contains different neighbourhoods:

Sectors	Saint-Jean	Saint-Luc	Iberville	Saint-Athanase	L'Acadie
Neighbourhoods	Vieux-Saint-Jean	Saint-Luc ("le Village")	Vieux-Iberville	Les Mille-Roches	Vieux-L'Acadie (Village)
Neighbourhoods	Saint-Gérard	Les Prés-Verts	Saint-Athanase	Saint-Athanase-Sud	Domaine-Deland
Neighbourhoods	Saint-Edmond	Talon	Saint-Noël-Chabanel		La Canadienne
Neighbourhoods	Saint-Lucien	L'Île-Sainte-Thérèse	Sacré-Coeur		Ruisseau-des-Noyers
Neighbourhoods	Saint-Eugène				
Neighbourhoods	Notre-Dame-Auxiliatrice				
Neighbourhoods	Notre-Dame-de-Lourdes				
Neighbourhoods	Normandie				

== Demographics ==
Historical Census Data - Saint-Jean-sur-Richelieu, Quebec
Year	Pop.	±%
2006	87,492	—
2011	92,394	+5.6%
2016	95,114	+2.9%
2021	97,873	+2.9%

In the 2021 Census of Population conducted by Statistics Canada, Saint-Jean-sur-Richelieu had a population of 97,873 living in 42,913 of its 44,255 total private dwellings, a change of 2.9% from its 2016 population of 95,114. With a land area of 226.93 km^{2} (87.62 sq mi), it had a population density of 431.3/km^{2} (1,117.0/sq mi) in 2021.

Canada census – Saint-Jean-sur-Richelieu community profile

	2021	2016	2011
Population	97,873 (+2.9% from 2016)	95,115 (+2.9% from 2011)	92,394 (+5.6% from 2006)
Land area	226.93 km^{2} (87.62 sq mi)	226.63 km^{2} (87.50 sq mi)	225.78 km^{2} (87.17 sq mi)
Population density	431.3/km^{2} (1,117/sq mi)	419.7/km^{2} (1,087/sq mi)	409.2/km^{2} (1,060/sq mi)
Median age	43.6 (M: 42.4, F: 45.2)	41.8 (M: 40.7, F: 42.9)	41.1 (M: 39.8, F: 42.3)
Private dwellings	42,910 (total)	42,036 (total)	40,411 (total)
Median household income	$74,500	$61,904	$55,412

Notes: Includes adjustment for 2001 merger with Saint-Luc, Iberville, Saint-Athanase and L'Acadie.
References: 2021 2016 2011

The amalgamated municipalities (with 2001 population) were:

- Saint-Jean-sur-Richelieu (37,386)
- Saint-Luc (20,573)
- Iberville (9,424)
- Saint-Athanase (6,691)
- L'Acadie (5,526)

=== Language ===
French was the mother tongue of 92.5% of residents. Other common mother tongues were English (2.5%), Spanish (0.8%), and Arabic (0.5%). 1.4% claimed both French and English as first languages, while 0.4% listed both French and a non-official language.

Canada Census Mother Tongue - Saint-Jean-sur-Richelieu, Quebec
Census	Total	French			English			French & English			Other		
Year	Responses	Count	Trend	Pop %	Count	Trend	Pop %	Count	Trend	Pop %	Count	Trend	Pop %
2021	96,835	89,580	▲1.09%	92.5%	2,385	▲3.02%	2.46%	1,310	▲61.72%	1.35%	3,010	▲52.02%	3.1%
2016	95,114	88,535	▲2.19%	93.08%	2,315	▼4.1%	2.43%	810	▲7.28%	0.85%	1,980	▲24.14%	2.08%
2011	91,400	86,635	▲6.4%	94.79%	2,415	▲14.5%	2.64%	755	▲48.0%	0.83%	1,595	▼20.6%	1.74%
2006	86,075	81,445	▲137.1%	94.62%	2,110	▲68.1%	2.45%	510	▲88.9%	0.59%	2,010	▲131.0%	2.34%
2001	36,745	34,350	▲1.1%	93.48%	1,255	▲16.2%	3.42%	270	▲3.8%	0.73%	870	▲74.0%	2.37%
1996	35,825	33,985	n/a	94.86%	1,080	n/a	3.01%	260	n/a	0.73%	500	n/a	1.40%

=== Ethnicity ===
Despite the fact that nearby Montreal is very racially diverse, in 2021 Saint-Jean-sur-Richelieu had a very large majority of white residents (~94.4%). 4.1% of residents were visible minorities and 1.5% identified as Indigenous. The largest visible minority groups were Black (1.4%) and Latin American (0.8%).

Panethnic groups in the City of Saint-Jean-sur-Richelieu (2001−2021)
Panethnic group	2021		2016		2011		2006		2001	
Panethnic group	Pop.	%	Pop.	%	Pop.	%	Pop.	%	Pop.	%
European (Note: Statistic includes all persons that did not make up part of a visible minority or an indigenous identity.)	90,345	94.41%	89,225	96.4%	87,900	97.26%	84,160	97.77%	35,930	97.77%
Indigenous	1,415	1.48%	1,135	1.23%	855	0.95%	585	0.68%	210	0.57%
African	1,300	1.36%	790	0.85%	480	0.53%	360	0.42%	120	0.33%
Middle Eastern (Note: Statistic includes total responses of "West Asian" and "Arab" under visible minority section on census.)	925	0.97%	390	0.42%	190	0.21%	165	0.19%	95	0.26%
Latin American	760	0.79%	360	0.39%	305	0.34%	265	0.31%	90	0.24%
Southeast Asian (Note: Statistic includes total responses of "Filipino" and "Southeast Asian" under visible minority section on census.)	390	0.41%	290	0.31%	235	0.26%	200	0.23%	175	0.48%
East Asian (Note: Statistic includes total responses of "Chinese", "Korean", and "Japanese" under visible minority section on census.)	315	0.33%	240	0.26%	220	0.24%	260	0.3%	105	0.29%
South Asian	145	0.15%	40	0.04%	55	0.06%	70	0.08%	20	0.05%
Other/multiracial (Note: Statistic includes total responses of "Visible minority, n.i.e." and "Multiple visible minorities" under visible minority section on census.)	110	0.11%	90	0.1%	130	0.14%	25	0.03%	10	0.03%
Total responses	95,695	97.77%	92,560	97.31%	90,380	97.82%	86,080	98.39%	36,750	98.3%
Total population	97,873	100%	95,114	100%	92,394	100%	87,492	100%	37,386	100%
Note: Totals greater than 100% due to multiple origin responses

Ethnic and Cultural origins (2021) (Includes multiple responses)	Population	Percent
Canadian	37,430	39.1%
French n.o.s	22,115	23.1%
Québécois	14,165	14.8%
French Canadian	8,260	8.6%
Irish	5,165	5.4%
Caucasian (White) n.o.s+ European n.o.s	3,460	3.6%
First Nations (North American Indian) n.o.s.+ North American Indigenous, n.o.s.	2,625	2.7%
Italian	2,115	2.2%
Scottish	1,715	1.8%
English	1,525	1.6%
German	1,250	1.3%
Christian n.i.e.	1,135	1.2%
Acadian	1,015	1.1%

=== Religion ===
68.9% of residents were Christian, down from 88.0% in 2011. 62.3% were Catholic, 4.3% were Christian n.o.s and 0.8% were Protestant. 29.3% of the population was non-religious or secular, up from 11.7% in 2011. All other religions and spiritual traditions accounted for 1.8% of the population. The largest non-Christian religion was Islam at 1.4%.

== Annual events ==
A park hosts the annual International Balloon Festival of Saint-Jean-sur-Richelieu, a hot air balloon festival which attracts thousands of tourists.

== Economy ==
Saint-Jean-sur-Richelieu is home to the Carrefour Richelieu regional shopping mall which has 115 stores.

Newer retail developments include Faubourg Saint-Jean, home to restaurants, services, stores, and a soon-to-open movie theatre.

The historic downtown area, which borders the Richelieu River and includes Richelieu and Champlain streets, is home to a variety of locally owned bars, restaurants, and shops.

St-Jean is a manufacturing centre for textiles, wood products, sporting equipment, and metal transformation. It hosts an Area Support Unit (ASU) of the Canadian Armed Forces, which functions as a primary recruit and officer training establishment.

== Infrastructure ==
The Ville de Saint-Jean-sur-Richelieu public transit system provides commuter and local bus services.

According to the 2016 Census, 22,840 residents, or 56.7% of the labour force work within the city. An additional 5,135 (12.7%) commute to Montreal, while 2,305 (5.7%) work in Longueuil, 1,440 (3.6%) work in Brossard, and 965 (2.4%) work in Chambly.

By contrast only 770 people commute from Montreal to work in Saint-Jean-sur-Richelieu every day, while 795 people commute from Longueuil, 780 commute from Chambly, 510 commute from Saint-Alexandre and 500 commute from Mont-Saint-Grégoire.

=== Transportation ===
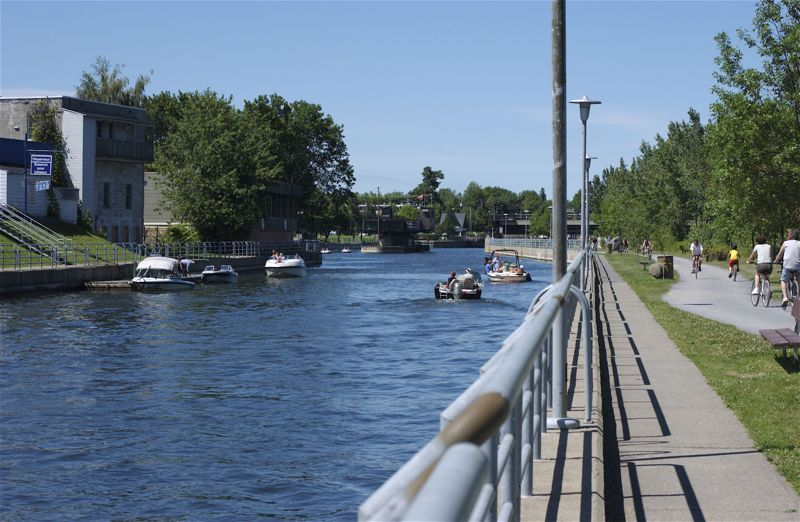
Chambly Canal

The city is split in two by Autoroute de la Vallée-des-Forts (Autoroute 35) which goes north–south by going first through Saint-Luc district, then turns east just south of Pierre-Caisse Boulevard in Saint-Jean-sur-Richelieu district to cross the Richelieu River and to finally continue its way south through St-Athanase and Iberville districts. The highway continues south for some 24 km before ending at Saint-Sébastien, but it is expected to be extended all the way to the Canada-United States border at Saint-Armand (Highgate Springs, Vermont) in the future, and will then continue as Interstate 89 in Vermont.

Saint-Jean-sur-Richelieu has its own municipal airport, Saint-Jean Airport, and is also close to Montréal–Trudeau International Airport.

The former International Railway of Maine runs through the town, now the connecting point for the Central Maine and Quebec Railway with the Canadian Pacific Railway. The former Saint-Jean-d'Iberville railway station, which until 1966 served the Ambassador to Boston and New York City and the Washingtonian to Washington, D.C., is now a preserved building.

== Education ==
The South Shore Protestant Regional School Board previously served the municipality.

In addition to more than a dozen public elementary and secondary schools, St-Jean is home to two private schools, one English-language school, and two higher education institutions:

- Ecole du quatre vent elementary French school
- École Vision Saint-Jean, a trilingual (French-English-Spanish) primary school
- École Secondaire Marcellin Champagnat, a historically Catholic (now non-religious) high school
- Saint-John's School, the city's only English-language school, which serves students from Kindergarten through high school. Per Quebec law, only children whose parents attended English-language school are allowed to attend English school themselves; French is mandatory for everyone else.
- Royal Military College Saint-Jean (French: Collège militaire royal de Saint-Jean) serves as a one-year preparatory program for the Royal Military College of Canada in Kingston, Ontario. Original founded in 1952, it ceased being a degree granting military college in 1995 due to cuts to military funding. RMCSJ continued to provide non-degree college programs for French-speaking cadets of the Canadian Forces. The Canadian federal government reopened the military college at Saint-Jean-sur-Richelieu in the fall of 2007 to provide the full first year of university, equivalent to the Kingston program, for students with English- or French-language backgrounds alongside the college program.
- CEGEP Saint-Jean-sur-Richelieu, part of Quebec's CEGEP network, offering post-secondary, pre-university programs

== Notable people ==
- Art Alexandre, professional hockey player, left wing for the Montreal Canadiens (NHL)
- Edward Antill, American lieutenant colonel who participated in the 1775 Battle of Quebec. Marries a Quebecker, and died there.
- Les Appendices, comedy group
- Diane Boudreau, writer
- Alexandre Boulerice, communication, adviser, community activist, journalist
- Gerry Boulet, rock singer with the Offenbach band
- Isabelle Brasseur, 1993 World Figure Skating Champion (Pairs), 1992/1994 Olympic bronze medalist
- Éric Bruneau, actor
- David Cadieux, Canadian champion heavyweight boxer
- Capitaine Révolte, music group formed in Saint-Jean-sur-Richelieu in 1998
- David Choinière, soccer player
- Mathieu Choinière, soccer player
- Stéphane Crête, actor
- Jeff Deslauriers, professional hockey goaltender, former Anaheim Ducks (NHL)
- Jade Downie-Landry, professional hockey forward in the PWHL
- Denis Gauthier, former professional hockey defenceman who played for the Calgary Flames, Phoenix Coyotes, Philadelphia Flyers and Los Angeles Kings (NHL)
- Bernard "Boom Boom" Geoffrion, right wing hockey player, former Montreal Canadiens (NHL), considered one of the innovators of the slapshot
- Claude Giroux, wrestler
- Hélène Harbec, Canadian journalist and poet
- Israël Landry, teacher, musician, music merchant, editor-in-chief, consul
- Rina Lasnier, GOQ, Canadian poet
- Pierre Légaré, stand-up comic
- Jean Lemieux, physician, novel and short-story writer
- Antoine L'Estage, Canada's most successful rally driver, 10-time Canadian Rally Championship winner, North American Rally Cup winner and Rally X-Games participant
- Didier Lucien, Quebec actor of Haitian origin
- Félix-Gabriel Marchand, journalist, author, notary and 11th Premier of Quebec (1897–1900)
- Joséphine Marchand-Dandurand, journalist, writer, and feminist activist
- Claudine Mercier, comedian, singer, actress and impressionist
- Jean-François Mercier, comedian, screenwriter and television host
- Kevin Owens, professional wrestler with WWE
- Jean-Marc Parent, comedian
- Danny Plourde, poet, novelist and professor
- Jean-Francois Quintin, hockey player, left wing for the San Jose Sharks (NHL)
- Claude Raymond was a major league pitcher and later a sports commentator.
- Aurélie Rivard, paralympic swimmer and multiple medalist
- Alain Rochat, Swiss footballer
- Joey Scarpellino, actor
- Ska/punk/reggae band Subb
- Valérie Tétreault, tennis player
- Pierre Tougas, watercolour painter
- Marie Turgeon, actress
- The Villeneuve family, racing drivers:
  - Gilles Villeneuve, Canadian racing driver, brother of Jacques-Joseph Villeneuve (born in Berthierville) and father of Jacques Villeneuve
  - Jacques Villeneuve, 1995 CART Champion, 1995 Indianapolis 500 Champion, and 1997 Formula One World Champion, NASCAR driver
- Mike Ward, comedian

== See also ==
- Le Haut-Richelieu Regional County Municipality
- Sainte-Thérèse Island
- Rivière des Iroquois
- Chambly Canal
- Richelieu River
- Champlain and St. Lawrence Railroad
- Royal Military College Saint-Jean
- L'Acadie (former municipality amalgamated into Saint-Jean-sur-Richelieu in 2001)
- List of cities in Quebec
