= Chambly Canal =

Historic canal in Montérégie, Québec

Coordinates: 45°22′38″N 73°15′27″W

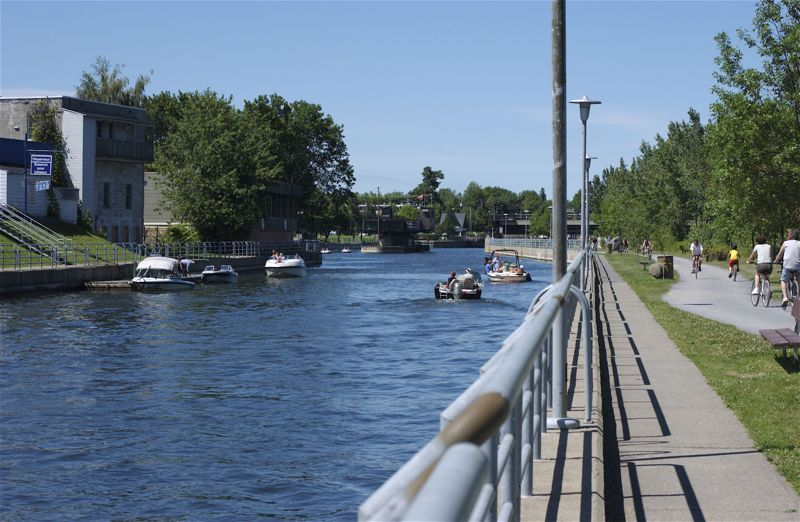
- Chambly Canal and multipurpose path, Saint-Jean-sur-Richelieu

Specifications
- Locks: 9
- Navigation authority: Parks Canada

History
- Construction began: September 5, 1831
- Date of first use: June 9, 1843
- Date completed: 1843

Geography
- Start point: Chambly
- End point: Saint-Jean-sur-Richelieu

National Historic Site of Canada
- Official name: Chambly Canal National Historic Site of Canada
- Designated: 1929

The Chambly Canal is a National Historic Site of Canada in the Province of Quebec, running along the Richelieu River past Saint-Jean-sur-Richelieu, Carignan, and Chambly. Building commenced in 1831 and the canal opened in 1843. It served as a major commercial route during a time of heightened trade between the United States and Canada. Trade dwindled after World War I, and as of the 1970s, traffic has been replaced by recreational vessels.

It is part of a waterway that connects the Saint Lawrence River with the Hudson River in the United States. Lake Champlain and the Champlain Canal form the U.S. portion of the Lakes to Locks Passage.

The Canal has 10 bridges—8 of which are hand operated—and nine hydraulic locks.

- Draft: 6.5 ft (1.98 m)
- Clearance: 29 ft (8.84 m)
- Canal Length: 20 km (12 mi)
- Dimensions of smallest lock: 110 ft × 21 ft (33.53 m × 6.40 m)
- Passage time: 3 to 5 hours

== Gallery ==
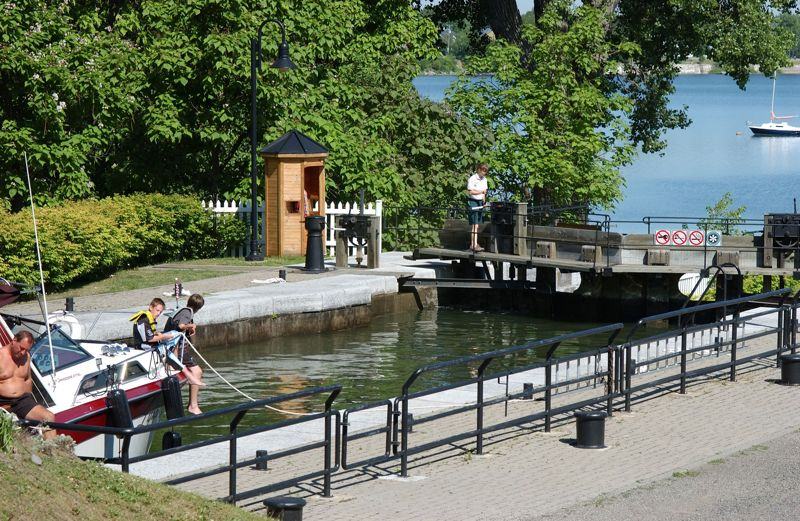
Locks in Chambly

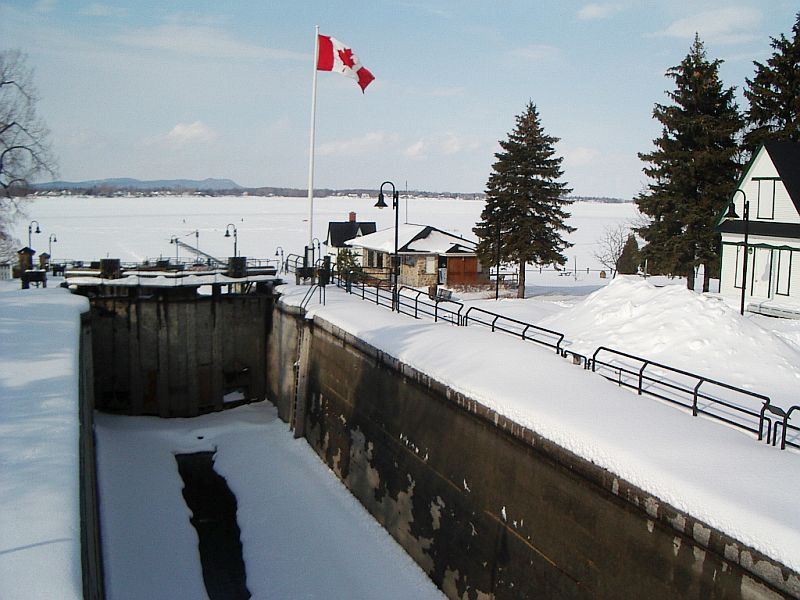
Lock in Chambly, viewed in winter.

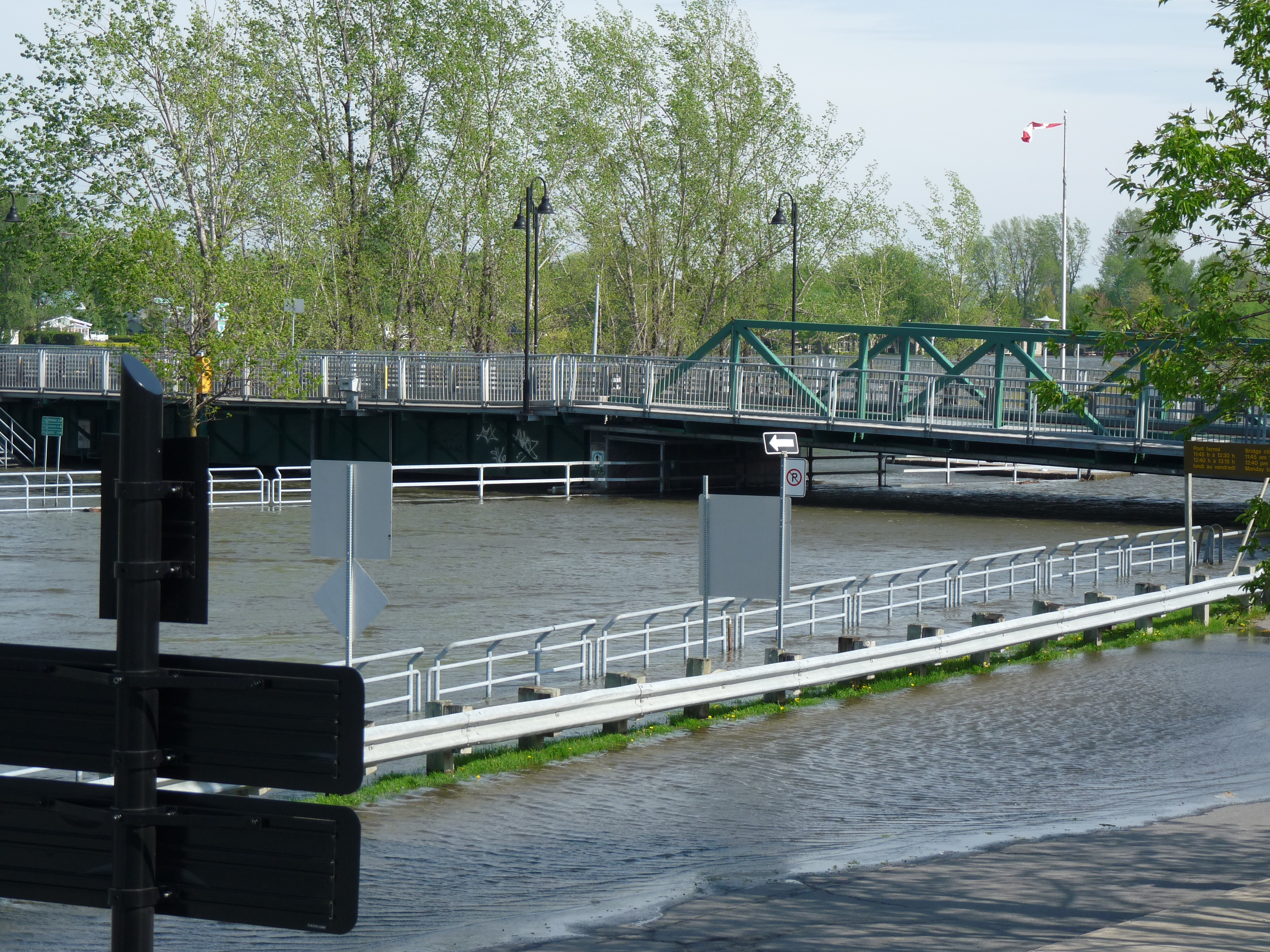
Lock in Saint-Jean-sur-Richelieu flooded during the 2011 Lake Champlain and Richelieu River Floods
