= Chambly Basin =

Body of water in Montérégie, Quebec

- bassin de Chambly (French)
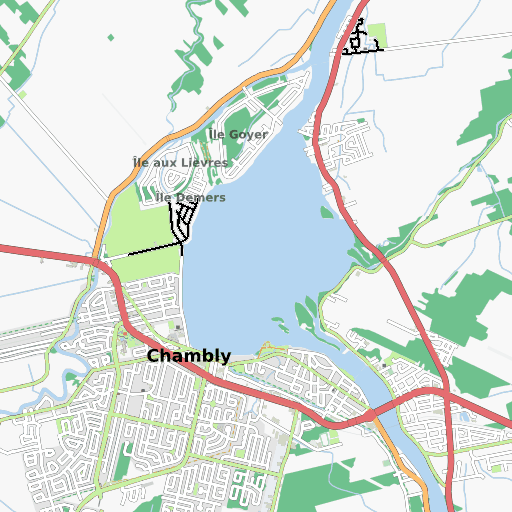

- Location within Quebec
- Location: Chambly, Montérégie, Quebec, Canada
- Coordinates: 45°27′40″N 73°17′00″W
- Type: basin
- Primary inflows: (clockwise) ruisseau Wilson, rivière des Hurons, Richelieu River, Chambly Canal
- Primary outflows: Richelieu River
- Basin countries: Canada
- Max. length: 1.98 mi (3.18 km)
- Max. width: 1.34 mi (2.16 km)
- Surface elevation: 11 to 100 ft (3.4 to 30.5 m)
- Settlements: Richelieu, Saint-Mathias-sur-Richelieu, Carignan and Chambly

The Chambly Basin (French: bassin de Chambly, pronounced [basɛ̃ də ʃɑ̃bli]) is a shallow, oblong body of water formed by an enlargement of the Richelieu River, extending out from the foot of the rapids on the river between Chambly and Richelieu, in the Quebec region of Montérégie. The towns of Chambly, Richelieu, Saint-Mathias-sur-Richelieu and Carignan surround the basin.

The Chambly Basin is an important area for recreational tourism activities including boating in the summer, the connected Chambly Canal and nearby Fort Chambly National Historic Sites. Its surface is generally frozen from mid-December to the end of March. The water level of the river varies with the seasons and the precipitation.

== Geography ==
The shape of the basin is similar to the shape of a football. The current from the Richelieu River arrives from the southeast by crossing the Chambly rapids for a length of approximately 1.35 kilometres (0.84 mi), i.e. downstream from the Yule bridge which spans this river in order to connect Chambly (west bank) and Richelieu (east bank). These rapids end at the height of an archipelago of small islands bordering the south-eastern shore of the basin.

The Rivière des Hurons flows toward the middle of the eastern shore of the basin. The Chambly Canal pours its waters on the south shore of the basin, in the area of the Chambly Canal National Historic Site of Canada.

The western part of the basin includes Île aux Lièvres, Demers Island (residential area), Île au Foin and Goyer Island (residential area). Channels separate these islands. These islands are part of the territory of the city of Carignan. The Acadia River which runs on the west side of Chambly drains at the northeast point of Goyer Island, that is 1.0 kilometre (0.62 mi) downstream of the limit north of the Chambly basin.

== History ==
Samuel de Champlain, the European to explore this body water in 1609, wrote: "The entrance to the sault is a kind of lake, where the water goes down, which contains some three leagues round."

In Jesuit Relations of 1665, we read: "This basin is like a small lake, a league and a half of a turn, six to eight feet deep. "

== Name ==
Chambly Basin was named after the surrounding seignory of Chambly. It's referred to as a "basin" as it's a shallow lake in which alluvium is deposited. The name French: Bassin de Chambly was formalized by the Quebec Commission of Geography in 1968.

== Image gallery ==
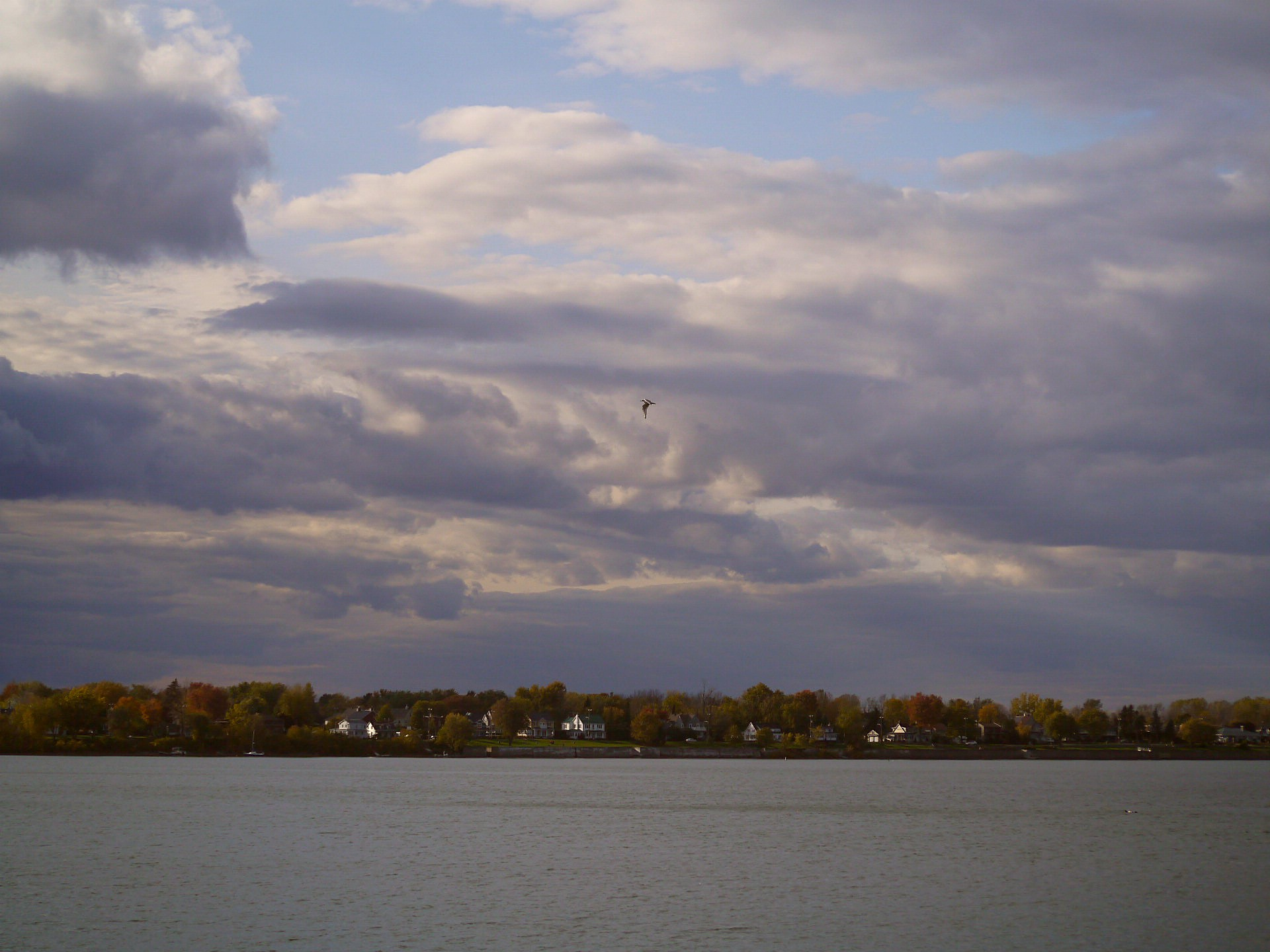
Chambly basin

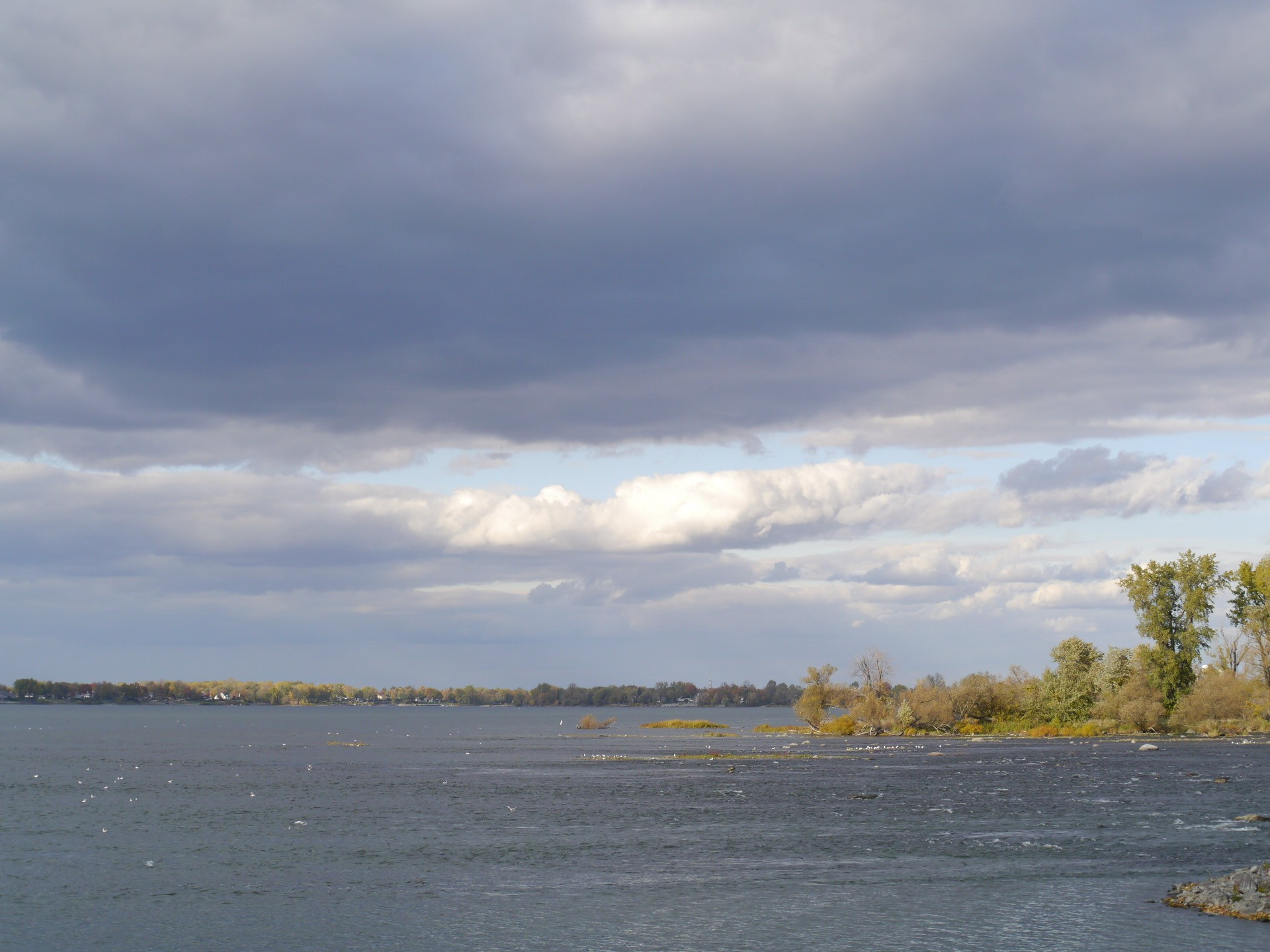
Rapides de Chambly

== See also ==
- Rouville Regional County Municipality
- La Vallée-du-Richelieu Regional County Municipality
- Richelieu
- Saint-Mathias-sur-Richelieu
- Carignan
- Chambly
- Richelieu River
- Rivière des Hurons
- Chambly Canal
- Fort Chambly
- Goyer Island
- Île aux Lièvres
- Demers Island
- Seigneurie de Chambly
- List of lakes of Montérégie
