= Rivière des Hurons (Richelieu River tributary) =

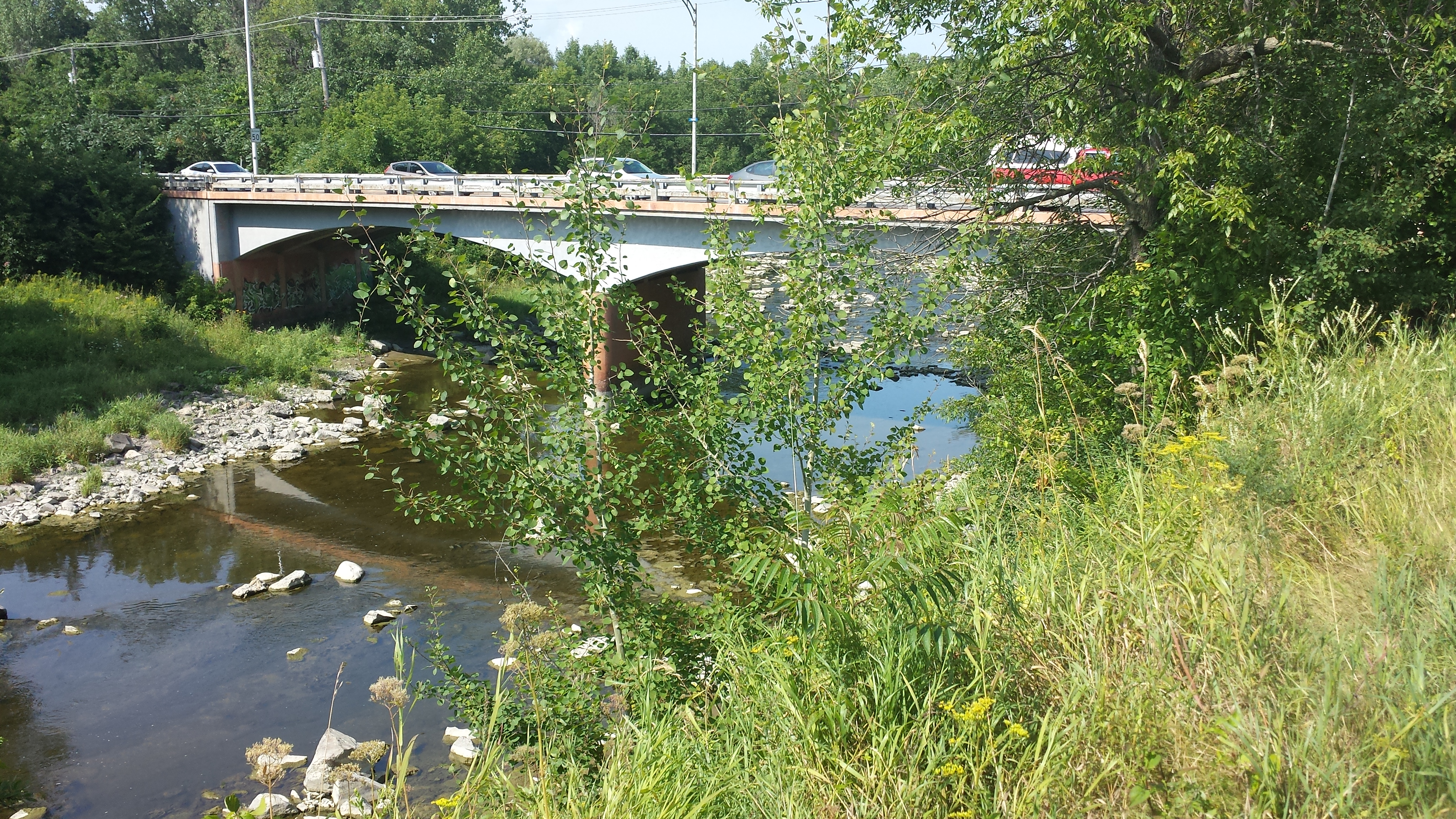
- Bridge spanning the Huron River on the Route des patriotes near the mouth of the river.

Location
- Country: Canada
- Province: Quebec
- Region: Montérégie
- Regional County Municipality: Les Maskoutains Regional County Municipality, La Vallée-du-Richelieu Regional County Municipality, Rouville Regional County Municipality
- Municipality: La Présentation, Saint-Charles-sur-Richelieu, Sainte-Marie-Madeleine, Sainte-Madeleine, Saint-Jean-Baptiste, Saint-Mathias-sur-Richelieu

Physical characteristics
- Source: Agricultural stream
  - location: La Présentation
  - coordinates: 45.62513°N 73.05025°W
  - elevation: 34 m (112 ft)
- Mouth: Richelieu River
  - location: Saint-Mathias-sur-Richelieu
  - coordinates: 45.45972°N 73.26222°W
  - elevation: 10 m (33 ft)
- Length: 33 km (21 mi)

Basin features
- Tributaries
  - left: (Upstream) Ruisseau de la Loutre, Ferguson stream, Pétrimoulx stream, Alexandre-Hamel stream, Lamarre stream, Saint-Louis stream, Léonide-Tétreault stream, Ours stream, Alix outlet, Jodoin stream, Normandin stream, Corbin stream, unidentified stream, Antoine-Lacombe stream, Trente stream.
  - right: (Upstream) Petite décharge des Trente, cours d'eau Sorel, ruisseau Cochon, cours d'eau Chicoine, ruisseau non identifié, petite décharge Noire.

The rivière des Hurons (English: Hurons River) flows for 33 kilometres (21 mi) to the east side spill in the Chambly Basin just north of the city of Chambly. Its mouth is in the municipality of Saint-Mathias-sur-Richelieu in the Rouville Regional County Municipality, in the administrative region of Montérégie, in Quebec, in Canada. Hurons River flows through the Les Maskoutains Regional County Municipality, RCM of La Vallée-du-Richelieu Regional County Municipality, then the western part of the MRC Rouville Regional County Municipality. The latter is entirely east of the Richelieu River.

Besides the village areas (or hamlets), agriculture is the main economic activity in this small valley.

The river surface is generally frozen from mid-December to the end of March. Safe traffic on the ice is generally from late December to early March. The water level of the river varies with the seasons and the precipitation.

== Geography ==
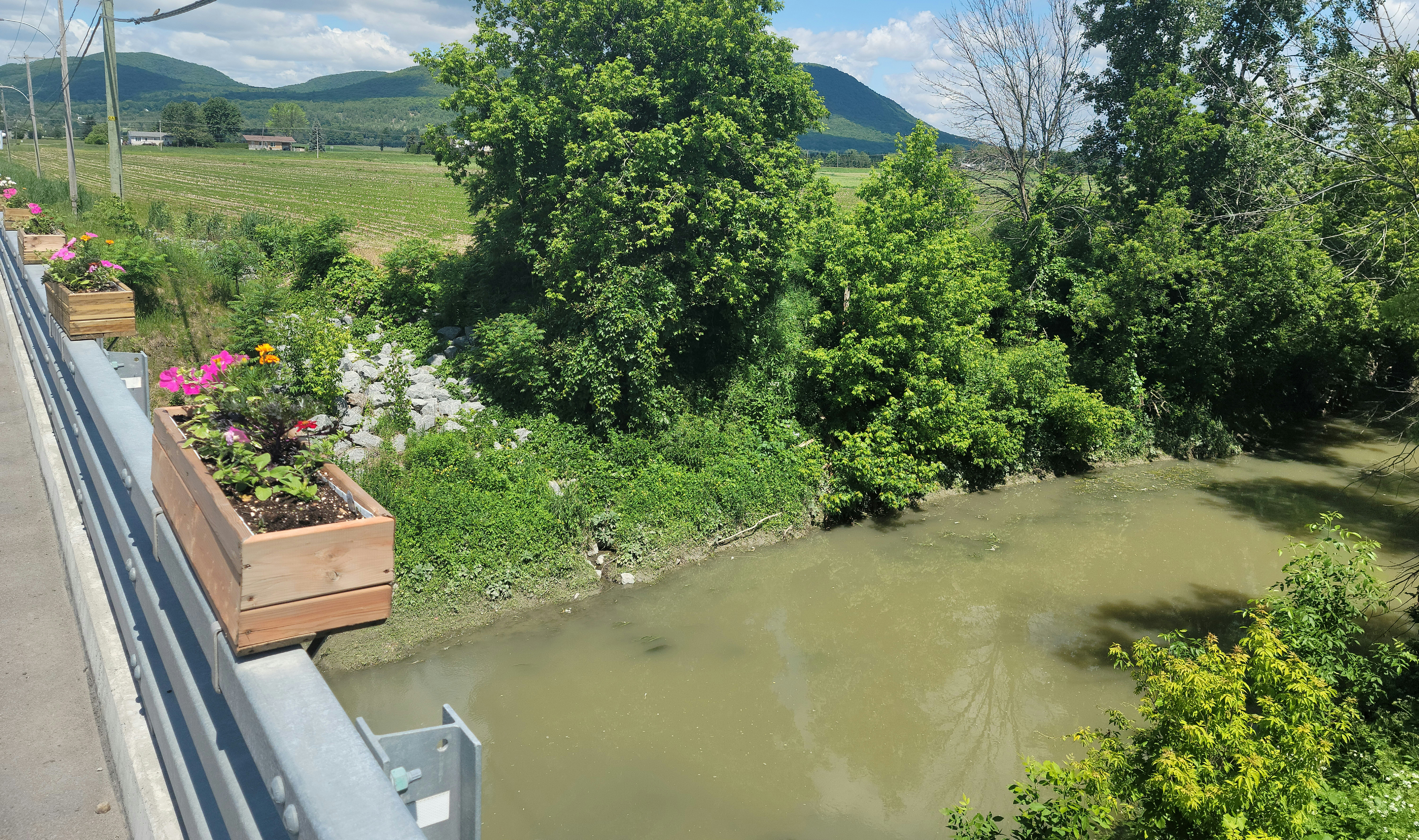
View of the Rivière des Hurons passing under the Chemin de Rouville bridge, in Saint-Jean-Baptiste, Quebec, with Mont Saint-Hilaire in the background

The head of the river watered many streams of the area north-west of Saint-Hyacinthe (sectors La Présentation, Saint-Charles-sur-Richelieu, Sainte-Marie-Madeleine (parish) and Sainte-Madeleine (village)). From its source, the river flows straight south. It cuts Highway 20, passes near Golf Club La Madeleine, cutting the Canadian National Railway tracks and Highway 116 about a mile west of the town of Sainte-Madeleine.

In its journey south, the river veers to the southwest to flow over 9.4 kilometres (5.8 mi) (measured by water) in Saint-Jean-Baptiste where it enters the village. The river then passes between the Mont Rougemont and Mont Saint-Hilaire it bypasses remotely. Then runs almost straight up to the limit of Saint-Mathias-sur-Richelieu, close to the northern part of the former territory of Sainte-Marie-de-Monnoir (merged to Marieville in 2001). Hence, this small river cut Saint-Mathias-sur-Richelieu, diagonally across 9.7 kilometres (6.0 mi) by water) to enter the Richelieu River, south of the village of Saint-Mathias-sur-Richelieu and north of the city of Richelieu.

In its course, especially in agricultural areas, the river is bordered on the east side by Highway 227 (called "row South River" in the municipality and, of Sainte-Marie-Madeleine). On the other side of the river, the road is named "North River Row". While in Saint-Mathias-sur-Richelieu, the road "Huron River East" along the river to its mouth, while the road "West Huron River" runs a segment on the other side of the river.

A designated hamlet "Huron River" was formed in Saint-Jean-Baptiste, about 5 kilometres (3 mi) west of Rougement and 12 miles (19 km) southeast of Mont Saint-Hilaire. Coordinates: -73.15527; 45.49528. Another designated hamlet "Hameau de Saint-Mathias-sur-Richelieu" is located 6 miles northeast of Chambly, on the left bank of the Hurons River. A post office named "The Hurons" has served this hamlet in the period February 1, 1909, to August 3, 1914. Decimal coordinates: -73.22361; 45.48306. While the bridge Great Huron is in La Présentation (municipality). Decimal coordinates: -73.10056; 45.62972.

Bridge Road Patriots (Route 133) crosses the small river close to its mouth. It is 23 kilometres (14 mi) by road from this bridge to the village of Sainte-Madeleine.

Huron River has a low gradient. It course may be navigable by small boats on some segment, especially in the period of seasonal flooding. Several bridges farm spans the little river, especially in the north.

== History ==
In all of the La Vallée-du-Richelieu Regional County Municipality as well, this sub-watershed was conducive to hunting, fishing and agriculture in Native American prehistory. For millennia, the area was frequented by indigenous semi-nomadic.

European origin pioneers (or their descendants) have begun to colonize the territory from the late 17th century, especially in the vicinity of the Richelieu River.

== Toponymy ==
In October 1673, the first acts of the concessions granted by the Lord of Chambly refer to the river called "the Huron". In common usage, this potamonyme turned a century later as "Hurons River". This gazetteer adaptation is mentioned in Acts 1773.

At the beginning of the French colony in Canada, many villages Iroquoian (Iroquois and Huron) are established near the Richelieu River (mainly near the mouth of the river), taking advantage of the fur trade with the French authorities and barter with Native American communities.

In the history of New France, many indigenous communities came to settle near the French population centers for safety and supply.

The name "Huron River" was formalized December 5, 1968, at the bank of place names of the "Commission de toponymie du Québec" (Geographical Names Board of Québec)

== See also ==
- Richelieu River
- Les Maskoutains Regional County Municipality
- Rouville Regional County Municipality
- La Vallée-du-Richelieu Regional County Municipality
- La Présentation
- Saint-Charles-sur-Richelieu
- Sainte-Madeleine
- Sainte-Marie-Madeleine
- Saint-Mathias-sur-Richelieu
- Saint-Jean-Baptiste Day
- Huron-Wendat Nation
- List of rivers of Quebec
