= Île aux Lièvres (Richelieu River) =

- Location within Quebec

Geography
- Location: Richelieu River
- Coordinates: 45.47166°N 73.29278°W
- Length: 1.2 km (0.75 mi)
- Width: 0.4 km (0.25 mi)

Administration
- Canada
- Province: Quebec
- Region: Montérégie
- RCM: La Vallée-du-Richelieu
- Municipality: Carignan

Additional information
- Accessible by a single road bridge.

L île aux Lièvres (English: Hare Island) is a river island of the Richelieu River, in the territory of the municipality of Carignan, in the La Vallée-du-Richelieu Regional County Municipality, in the region administrative Montérégie, in the south of province of Quebec, in Canada.

This island includes the municipal park of the northern tip of Île aux Lièvres, the Seigneurie park and the Chenaux park.

== Geography ==
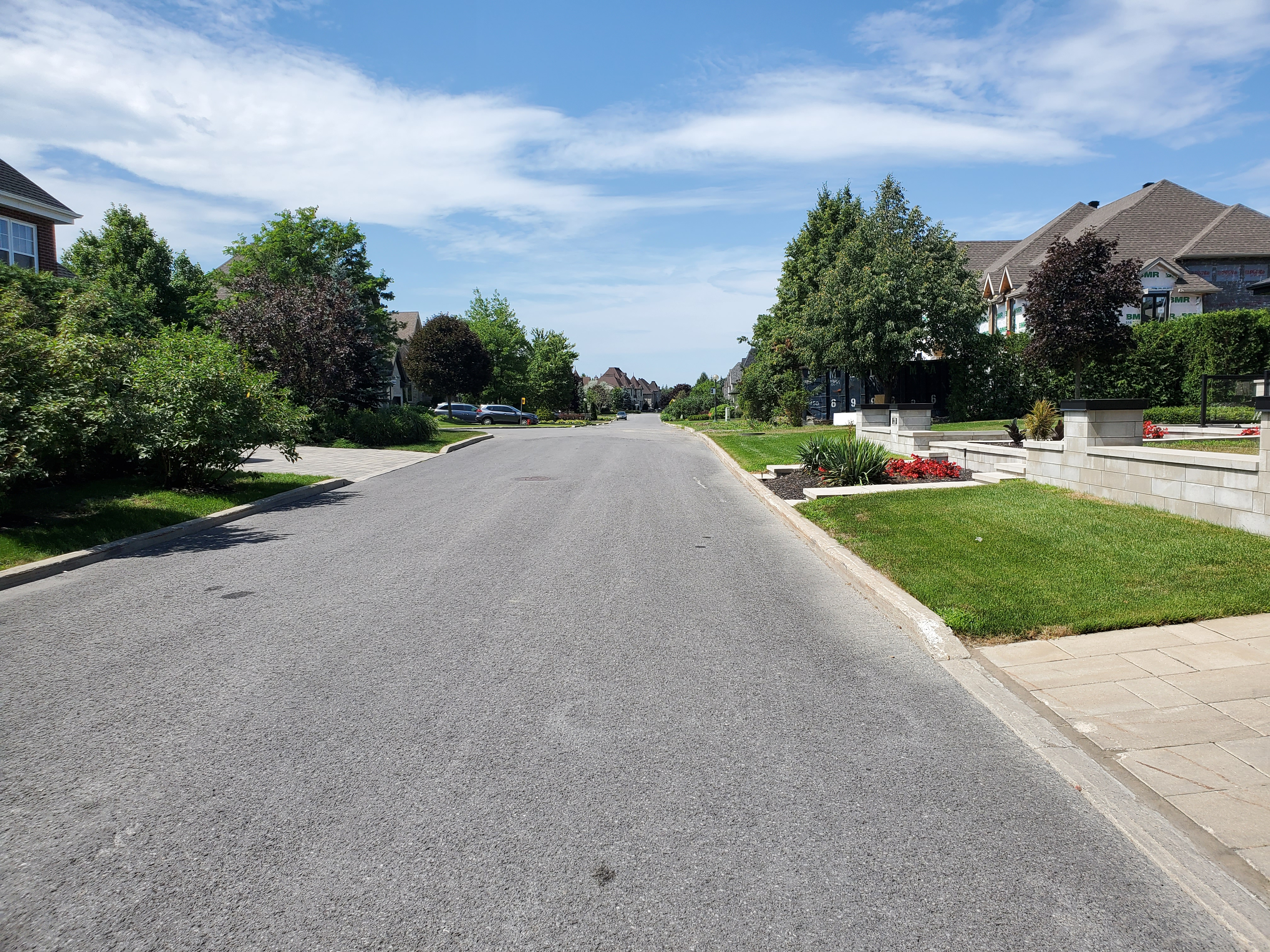
Olivier-Morel street on Île aux Lièvres, Carignan (QC).

Île aux Lièvres is bounded by the east bank of the Acadia River; the northeast channel separating it from Goyer Island; the east channel separating it from Hay Island and Demers Island (which are located on the west shore of the Bassin-de-Chambly); and a small channel separating it with a point of land from the town of Chambly where a golf course is laid out. This island is the second largest of the four islands separating the Bassin-de-Chambly and the Acadia River. The other islands are Goyer Island, Demers Island and Île au Foin. A pedestrian bridge connects Goyer Island and Île aux Lièvres.

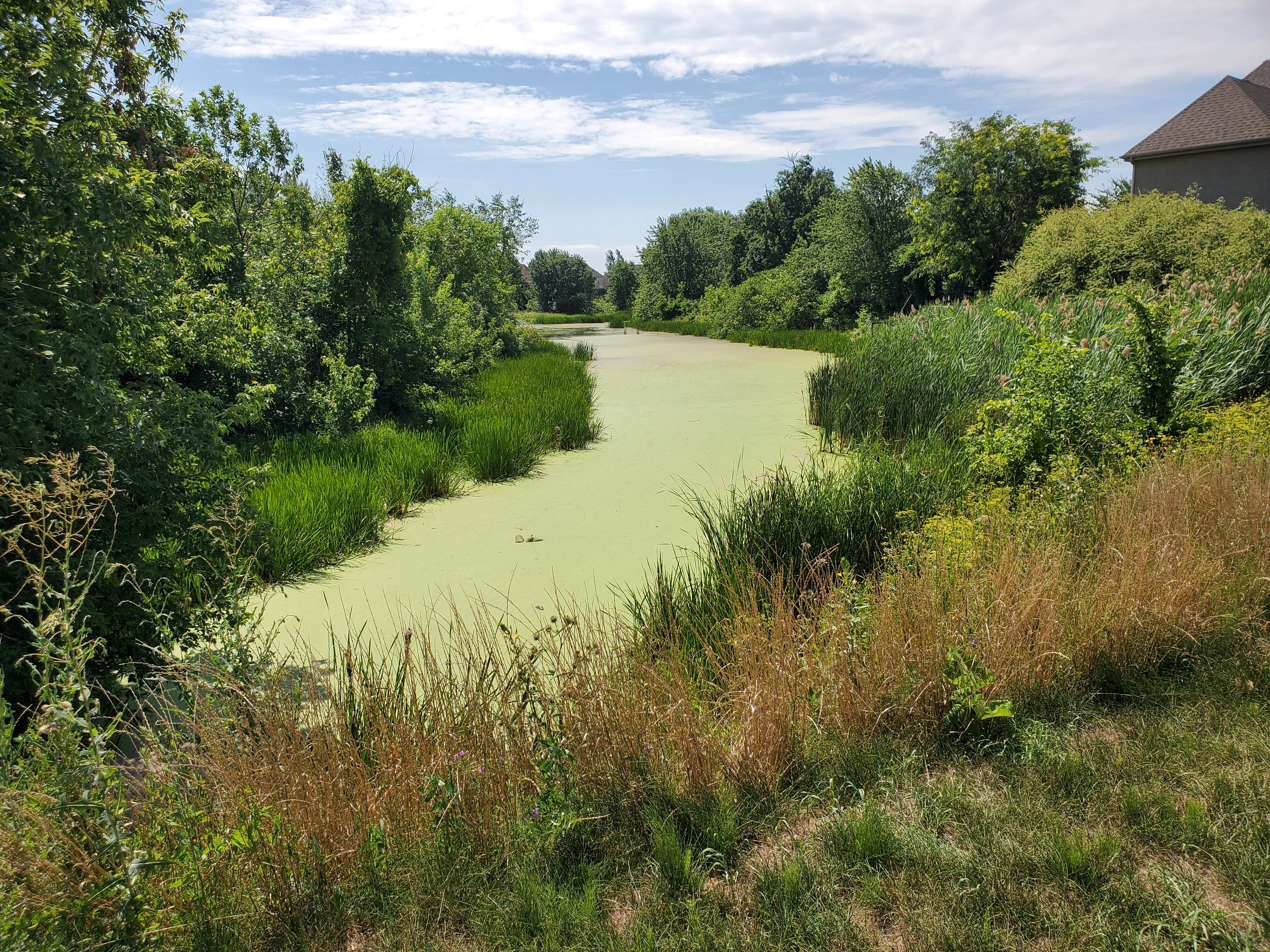
Lagoon (channel) between the Chambly basin and rue Jean-de-Ronceray on l'Île aux Lièvres, Carignan (QC)

Stretched in a north–south direction, Île aux Lièvres resembles the front of a horse whose head looks towards the Chambly basin. This island is approximately 1.2 kilometres (0.75 mi) in length over a maximum width of 0.4 kilometres (0.25 mi). The southern and northwestern part of the island turns out to be a residential area. The party is a municipal wooded park with walking trails and a bike path. This 10-hectare (25-acre) park was established in May 2017, when the city of Carignan acquired this land from the company Le Développement de la Seigneurie des Îles inc. This park has a bicycle and pedestrian link connecting Île Goyer and Île aux Lièvres. This forest ecosystem makes it possible to observe the flora and fauna. It is particularly frequented by bird watchers.

Île aux Lièvres is accessible via rue Olivier Morel (north side) and rue Jean de Roqueray (south side). Île aux Lièvres does not have an access bridge to the route 223 which runs along the west bank of the Acadie and Richelieu rivers.

== Toponymy ==
Formerly, the snowshoe hare was widespread in the Richelieu valley notably by its capacity of reproduction and its capacity to survive the harsh winters. The woods of the island proved to be a certain refuge from its natural predators. Given the proximity of the town of Chambly, some residents used to come to Île aux Lièvres to trap the hare using snares or gun hunting.

The toponym "Île aux Lièvres" was formalized on August 17, 1978 at the Place Names Bank of the Commission de toponymie du Québec.

== See also ==
- List of islands of Quebec
