= Demers Island =

River island in Quebec, Canada

- Location within Quebec

Geography
- Location: Carignan, La Vallée-du-Richelieu Regional County Municipality, Montérégie, Québec, Canada
- Coordinates: 45.46528°N 73.2875°W
- Length: 1.2 km (0.75 mi)
- Width: 0.36 km (0.224 mi)

Administration
- Canada

Additional information
- Accessible by a single road bridge.

The Demers Island is a river island of the Richelieu River. It is located in the territory of the municipality of Carignan, in the La Vallée-du-Richelieu Regional County Municipality, in the administrative region of Montérégie, in the south of province of Quebec, in Canada.

This island has a few private wharves on the west shore of the Chambly basin. Since the second half of XXth, its vocation has been residential and focused on recreotourism activities. This island includes the Rémy-Nolet leisure park.

== Geography ==
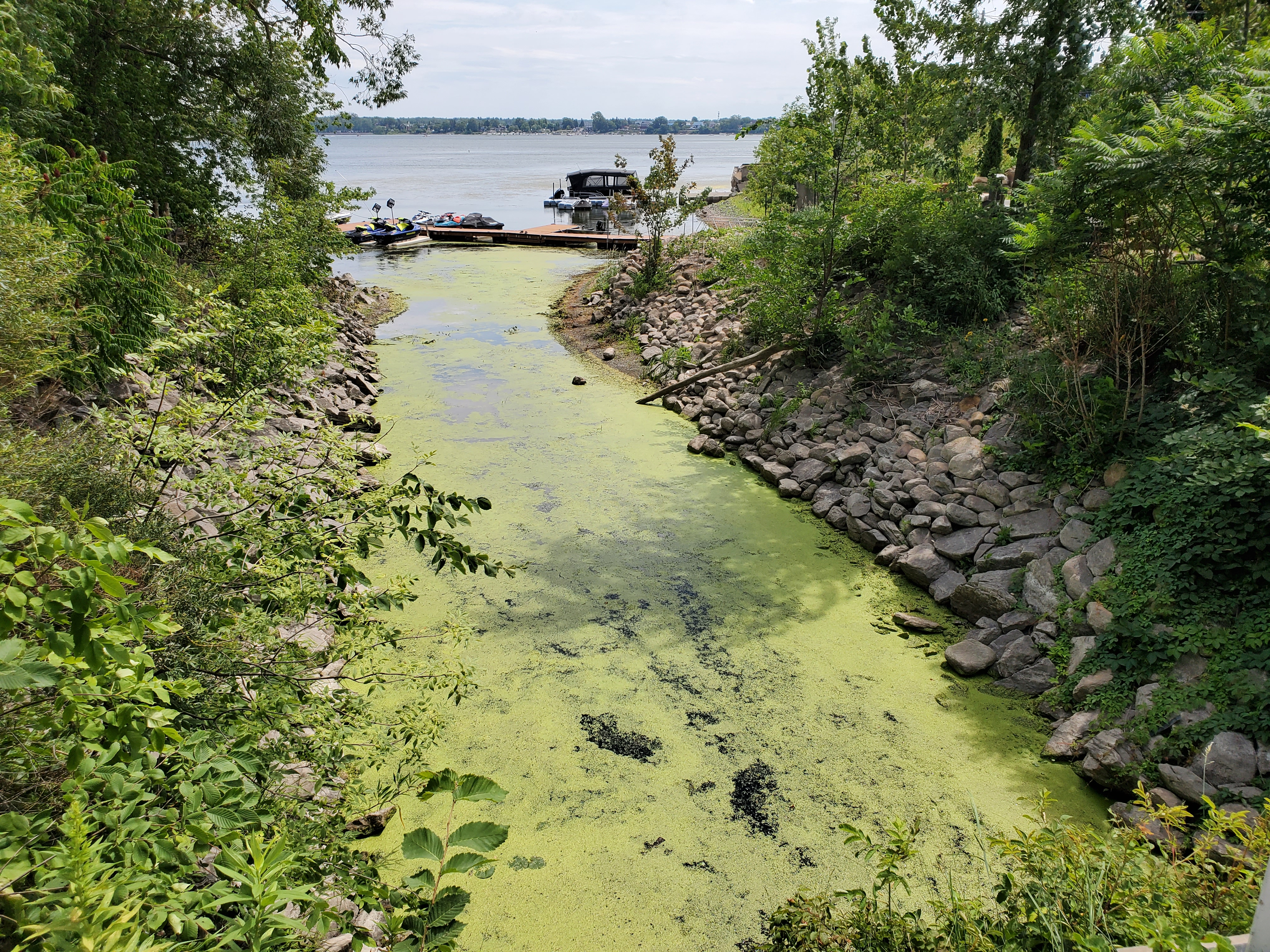
Channel separating Île Demers (Carignan) and the city of Chambly (view towards the mouth)

Demers Island occupies the western part of the Bassin-de-Chambly. This island is the third in area among the four islands separating the Bassin-de-Chambly and the Acadia River. The other islands are Île aux Lièvres, Goyer Island and Île au Foin (Hay Island). Demers Island is linked on the northeast side by a strip of land with Hay Island. A pedestrian bridge connects Île aux Lièvres and Île Goyer.

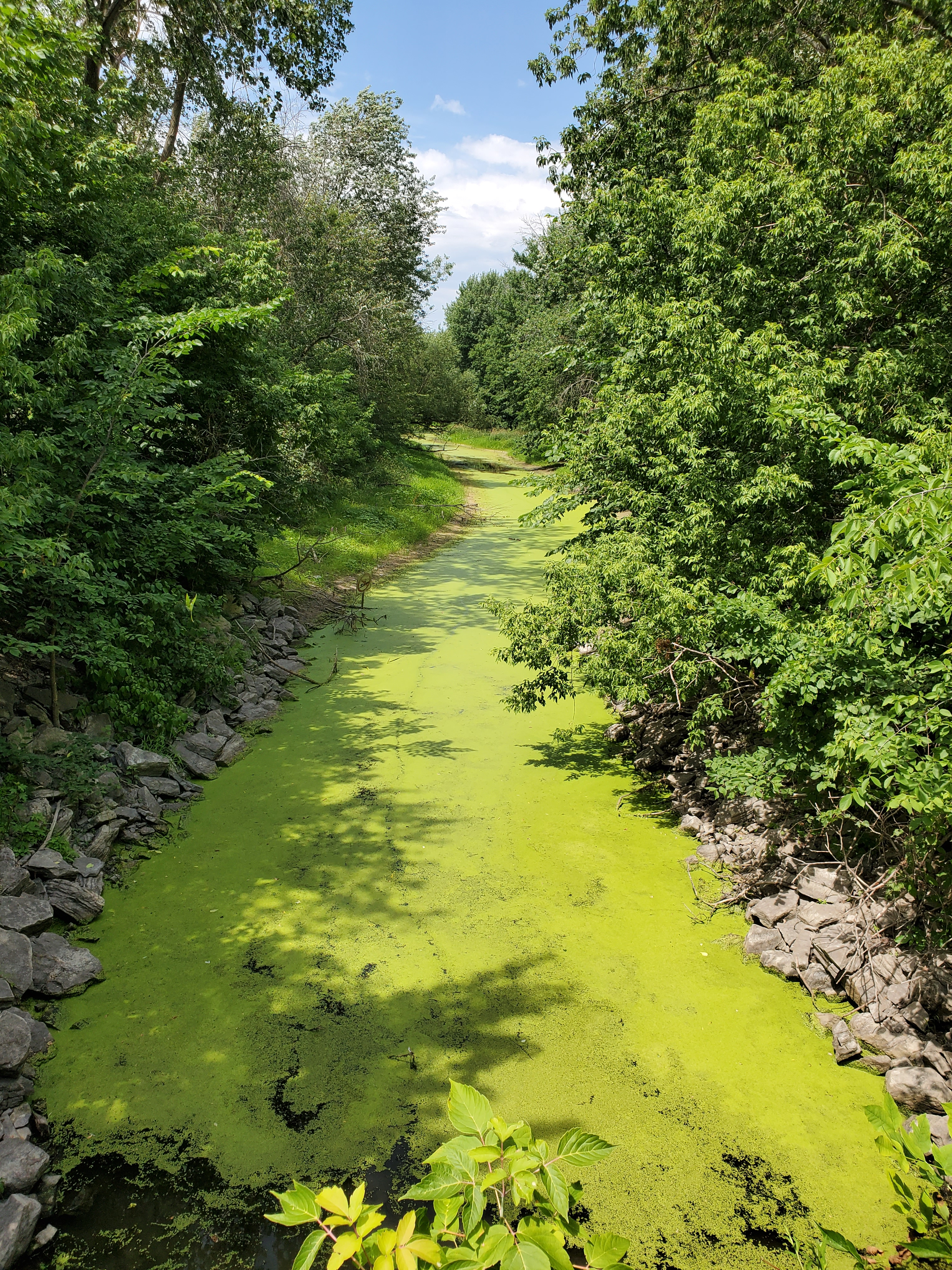
Channel separating Île Demers (Carignan) and the city of Chambly (view to the north)

Elongated in shape, Demers Island measures approximately 1.2 kilometres (0.75 mi) in length and a maximum width of 0.36 kilometres (0.22 mi). On the west side, a canal separates Demers Island from Lièvres Island; a segment of approximately 240 metres (790 ft) from the Chambly basin serves as a boundary between the town of Chambly and the town of Carignan. The canal continues on the northeast side, separating Demers Island and Hay Island. These narrow canals are bordered by a narrow strip of marshland.

Demers Island is accessible through a small bridge built on Demers Street (which becomes Daigneault Street in Chambly), to span the stream. This bridge thus links the island to rue Martel which runs along the Chambly basin in the city of Chambly.

== Spring floods ==
Spring floods often affected the land adjacent to the shores of Demers Island. The overflow of the Richelieu River is recurrent.

== Toponymy ==
At the beginning of the 20th century, Demers Island was designated by the inhabitants of the "Ile au Beurre" sector. This unofficial name comes from a wild plant called "petit beurre". Formerly, this plant was very widespread on this island. The toponym "Demers Island" evokes the memory of the Demers family. Joseph-Honoré Demers was the owner of this island in the first half of the 19th century.

Demers Island has 12 streets which are designated by tree names (e.g. Cedars, Oaks, Elms, Maple, Pines, Fir, Aspens, Lime trees). These streets are linked to rue Demers which runs along the Chambly basin.

The toponym "Île Demers" was formalized on August 17, 1978 at the Place Names Bank of the Commission de toponymie du Québec.

== See also ==
- List of islands of Canada § Quebec
