= Goyer Island =

Island in Quebec, Canada

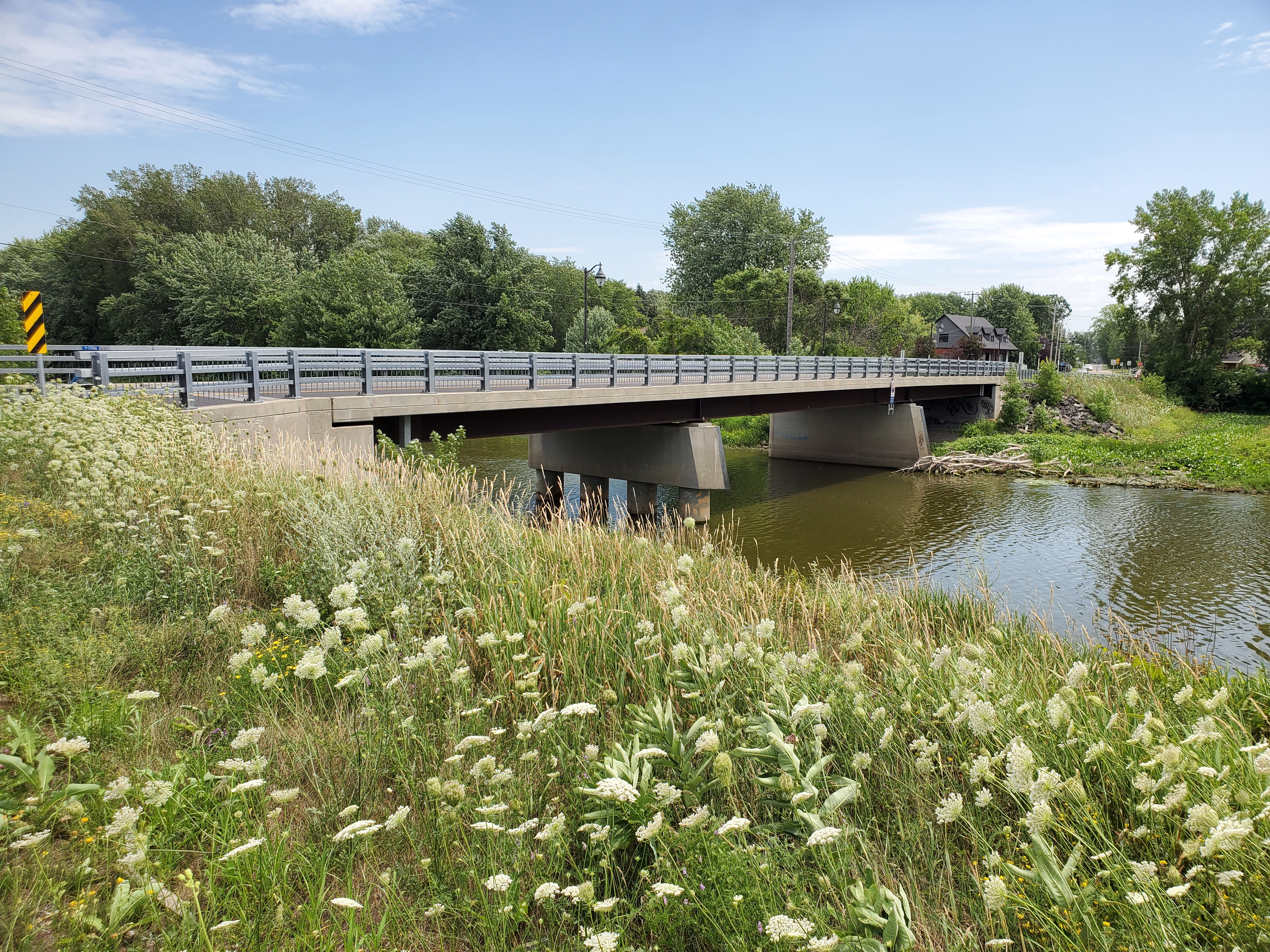
- Road bridge spanning the Acadia River, connecting Goyer Island and Route 223

- Location within Quebec

Geography
- Location: Carignan, La Vallée-du-Richelieu Regional County Municipality, Montérégie, Québec, Canada
- Coordinates: 45.47694°N 73.28°W
- Length: 2.1 km (1.3 mi)
- Width: 0.8 km (0.5 mi)

Administration
- Canada

Additional information
- Accessible by a single road bridge.

L'Île Goyer is a river island of the Richelieu River. It belongs to the territory of the municipality of Carignan, in the La Vallée-du-Richelieu Regional County Municipality, in the administrative region of Montérégie, in the south of province of Quebec, in Canada.

A municipal Bévédère stop, located on backfilled land, is located on the southeast side on the shore of the Bassin-de-Chambly, where civic parties are sometimes organized. Genest Park, located at the intersection of Deux-Rivières and Tulippes streets, and comprising an area of 1,786 metres (5,859.58 ft) was redeveloped in 2019. This park includes a permanent dek hockey area as well as play areas for children and pre-teens. There is also the waterfront park of Île Goyer located in the northeast part on the northwest shore of the Chambly basin.

== Geography ==
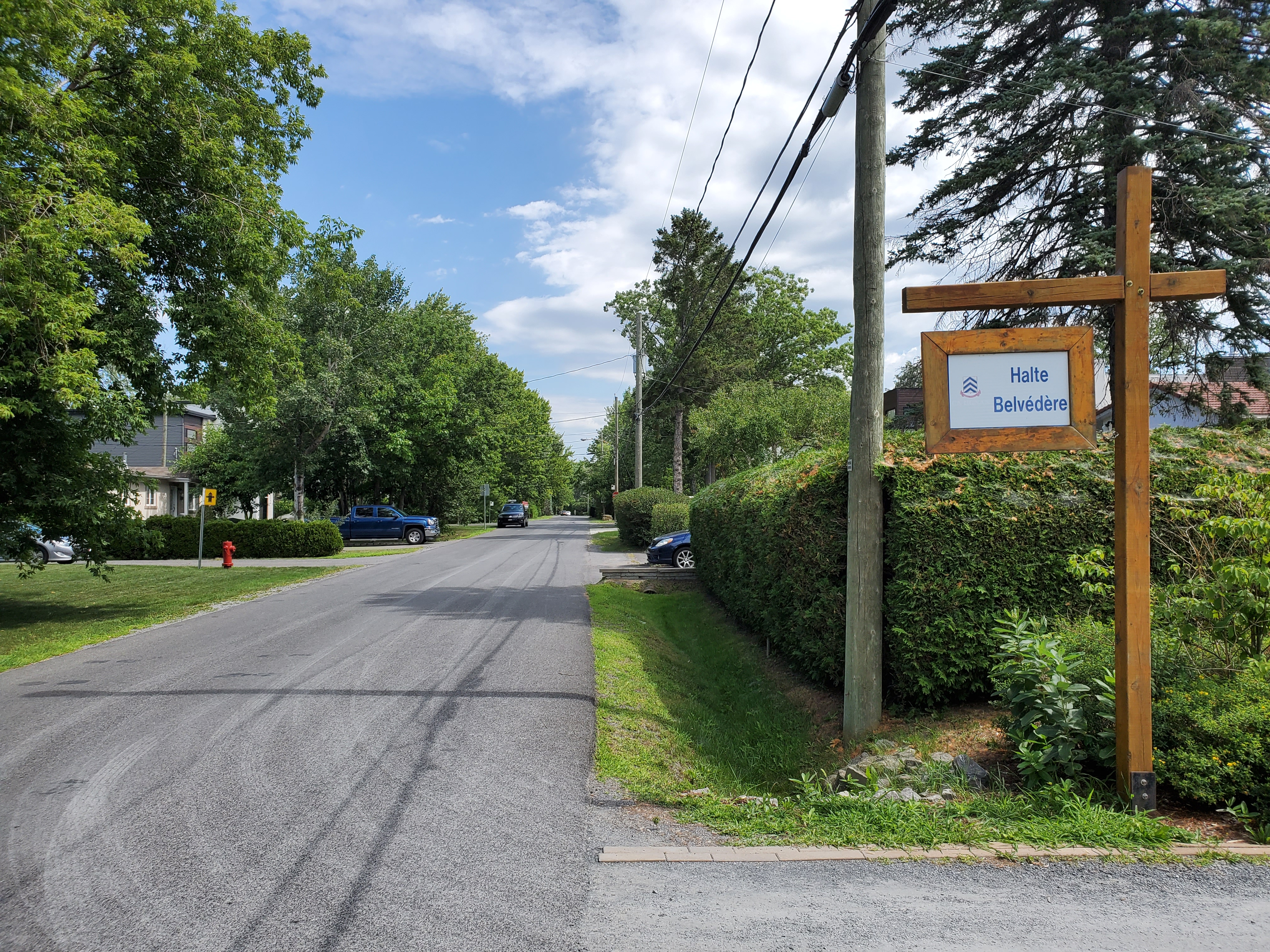
Welcome sign at the Belvédère Halte de l'Île Goyer (on Des Roses Street)

The Île Goyer occupies the northwestern part of the Bassin-de-Chambly and delimits the confluence of the Acadia River and the Richelieu River. This island is the largest in area among the four islands separating the Bassin-de-Chambly and the Acadia River. The other islands are Île aux Lièvres, Demers Island and Île au Foin. A pedestrian bridge connects Île aux Lièvres and Goyer Island.

Triangular in shape, Goyer Island measures approximately 2.1 kilometres (1.3 mi) in length and a maximum width of 0.8 kilometres (0.50 mi). Canals on the southwest side separate Goyer Island with Hay Island and Lièvres Island. A small stream crosses the wooded park of the island (towards the north, in the direction of its length) to discharge from the north side of the rue des Deux Rives in a channel which is 0.6 kilometres (0.37 mi) crossing the wooded park, cutting rue des Tulipes, and flowing on the southeast bank of the L'Acadie river.

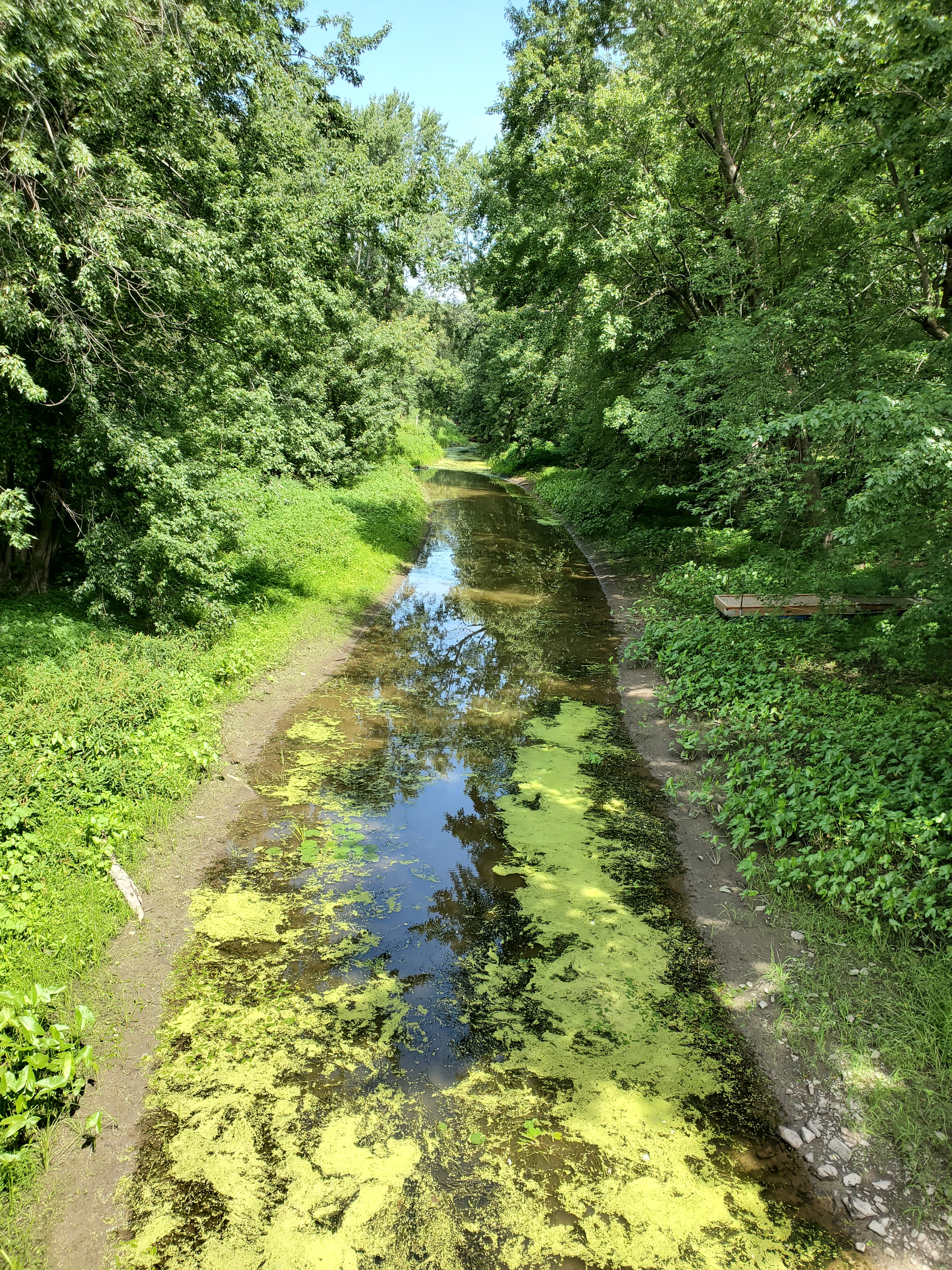
Channel separating Île Goyer and Île aux Lièvres seen from the pedestrian bridge (view to the south)

The island has a marsh area downstream from the Goyer bridge, along the Acadie river and another area connected to the channel separating Lièvres Island and Hay Island. Thanks to the city's acquisition of land in 2017 from the company Le Développement de la Seigneurie des Îles inc, the northern tip of the island will retain its natural character.

Goyer Island is accessible by a bridge spanning the Acadie river at 1.1 kilometres (0.68 mi) from the mouth of the latter. This bridge connects the island to the route 223 which runs along the west bank of the Acadie and Richelieu rivers.

== Spring floods ==
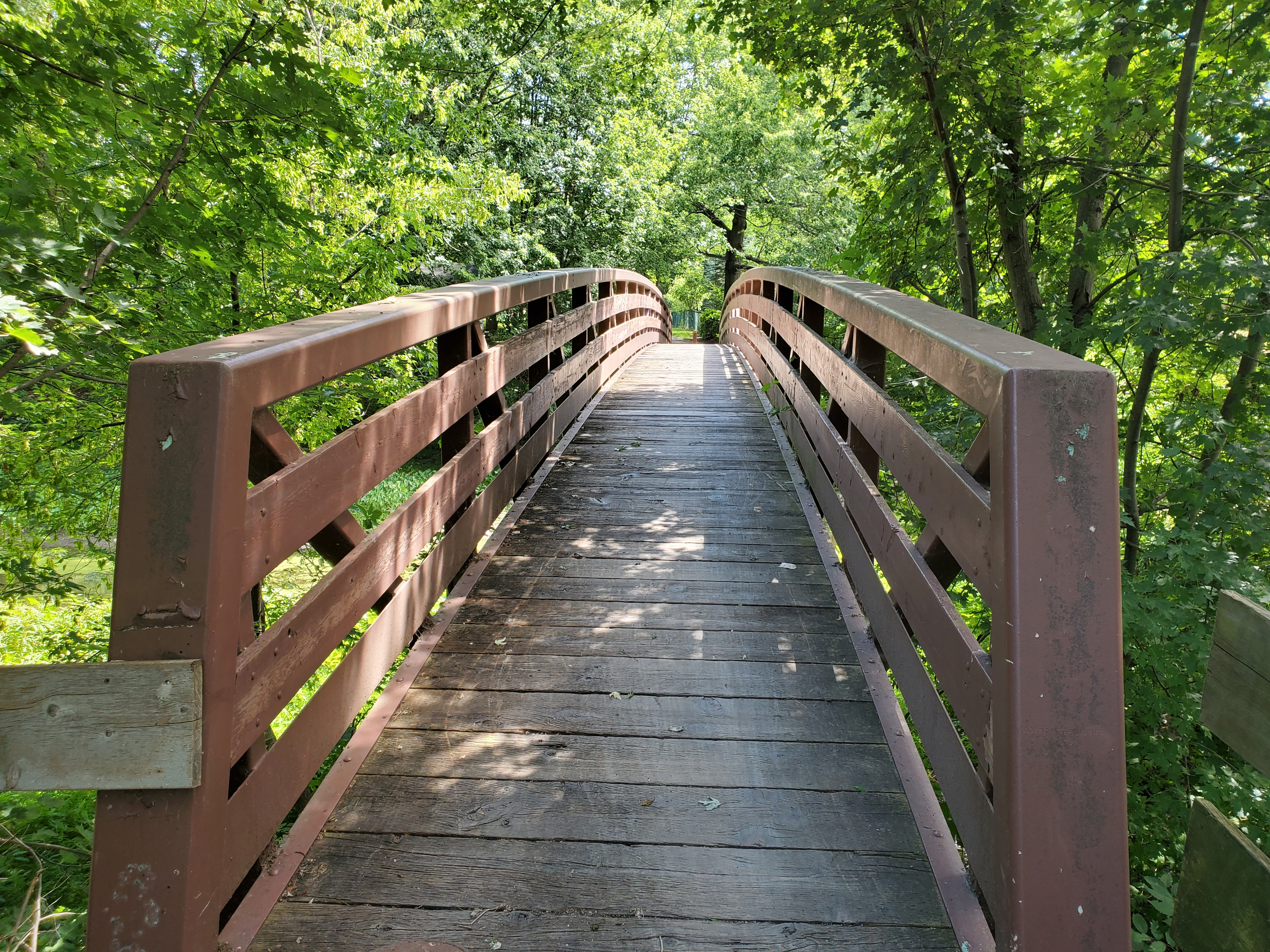
Pedestrian bridge spanning the channel separating Île Goyer and Île aux Lièvres in Carignan (QC)

Spring floods often affected the land adjacent to the shores of Goyer Island. The overflow can be caused by the Acadie river (especially near the Goyer bridge) or the Richelieu river. For example, in late March 1976, the 125 families on Goyer Island were isolated by the flooding of segments of route 223. In March 1984, fireworks exploded the ice of the Chambly basin to facilitate breakup, in order to free the 150 isolated families on Goyer Island. The floods of 1986, 1993 and 1998 required the use of a shuttle bus allowing the inhabitants of the island to go to the town hall of Carignan to shelter the victims.

This island has several private marinas or wharves. Since the second half of XXth, its vocation has been residential and focused on recreotourism activities.

== History of the island ==
The vocation of this small archipelago to which Goyer Island belongs has evolved over the course of history, in particular because of its strategic position downstream from the Chambly Rapids on the Richelieu River. However, it represented a temporary isolation constraint due to the absence of a bridge to connect the mainland during spring floods or major floods. The Amerindians used these islands as a stopover on their route to go up or down the river. Native American stops were often used to hide their equipment or as a meeting point for Native American trade.

Under the regime of New France, the Lord of Chambly ceded this island in 1721 to his censitaires in order to graze their animals there; thus, fences were not required to keep control over the animals. After the War of 1812, the Grande Isle was considered in the British defense projects of the Vallée-du-Richelieu. According to an ordinance of 1815, the British army planned to erect important fortifications on this island in order to replace Fort Chambly; however, this military strengthening project was never implemented. Subsequently, a farm was established on this island. In the 1940s, the real estate assets consisted only of an old farm house and a barn.

In 1946, three business figures and politicians joined forces to buy the island to undertake a housing construction project: Conrad Williams, Arsène Burelle and Arthur Dupré. This group of business people undertook to build a single-lane wooden bridge there to connect Goyer Island to the road along the west bank of the Acadie River (formerly known as "Little Montreal River") and the Richelieu River. A first street has been built in the western part of the island. Of the three associates initially resident in Beloeil, only Conrad Williams settled on the island with his family. Their families first settled in a chalet, then in a building serving from June 1948 as permanent residence and convenience store to serve new residents of the island and vacationers.

In 1954, the brothers Édouard and Charles-Emile Goyer became owners of the island with the aim of accelerating residential construction there. These businessmen notably owned a sand and gravel quarry in Saint-Bruno-de-Montarville where they resided. Charles-Emile Goyer already owned a house on Goyer Island. Their first initiative for the development of Goyer Island was to replace the old wooden bridge with a metal bridge sold by the Quebec government. Thus, the metal bridge was dismantled from its original site and rebuilt at the site of the wooden bridge over the L'Acadie river. The Goyer brothers thus favored the permanent development of the island which would henceforth be named according to their patronymic.

== History of business places on the island ==
In accordance with the town planning regulations of the city of Carignan, two commercial sites are authorized on this island, including a convenience store in a building that was erected around 1946-48 next to the wooden bridge. Initially, this convenience store was operated by Conrad William, a businessman. In addition, a restaurant has been in operation at the Goyer Island marina, at 1889 rue des Roses, under several names throughout history, in particular: "Goyer Island Marina". until 1983, "Les Saisons de l'Île Goyer" (a brochetterie) since 1983.

== Toponymy ==
During its history, this island has designated by several names: Saint-Pierre Island, Grosse Île, Grande Île and Johnson Island. The toponym "Île Goyer" evokes the memory of the Goyer brothers who acquired the island's territory in 1954 to exploit it by housing construction: Édouard Goyer (1913–1987) and Charles-Émile Goyer (1916–1981).

Apart from the "rue des Deux Rivières" which divides the island in two from the bridge spanning the L'Acadie river, the other streets on this island have names of flowers: Tulips, Hyacinths, Amarantes, Roses, Lilacs.

The toponym "Île Goyer" was formalized on February 21, 1973, at the Place Names Bank of the Commission de toponymie du Québec.

== See also ==
- La Vallée-du-Richelieu Regional County Municipality
- Carignan, a city
- Richelieu River
- Acadia River
- Bassin-de-Chambly
- List of islands of Canada#Quebec
