= Frederick Montye Morson =

Canadian judge

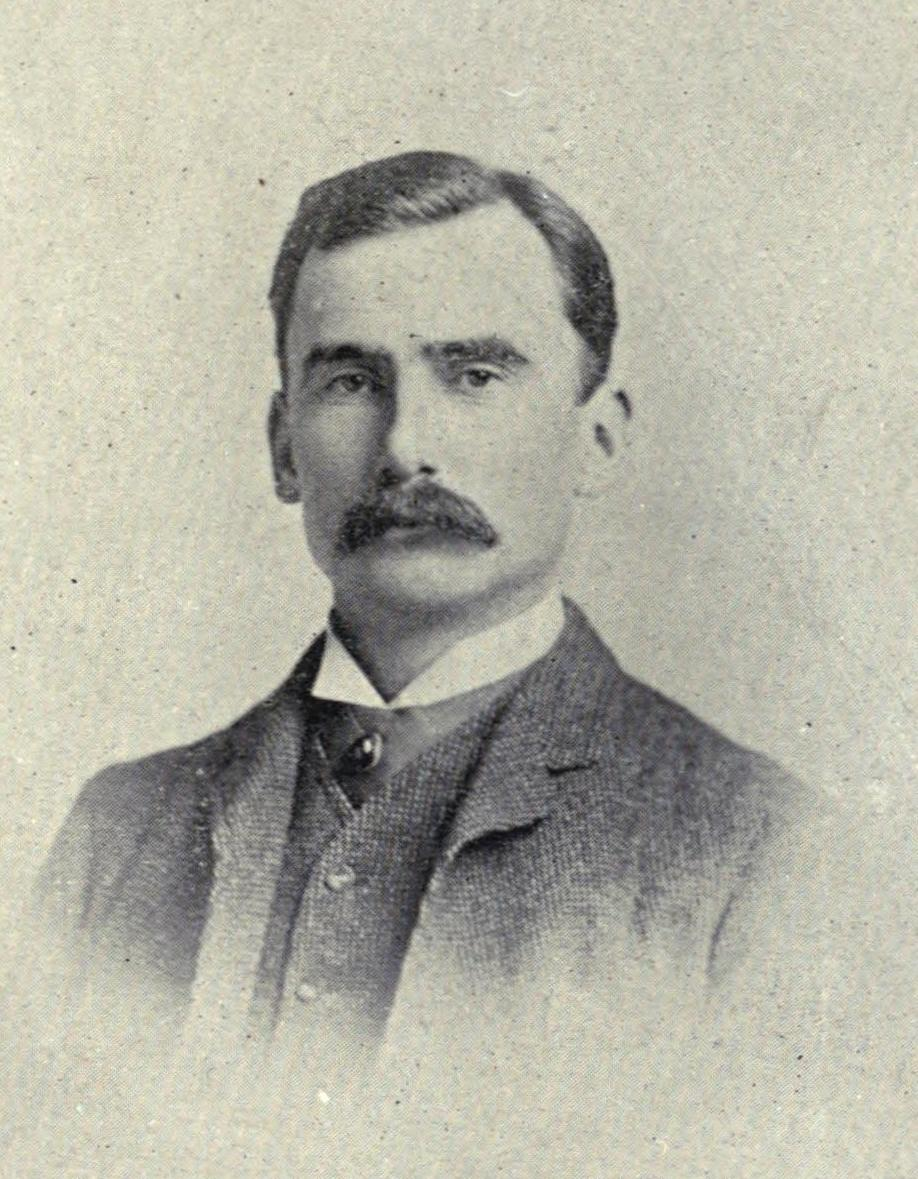
Morson circa 1891

Frederick Montye Morson (October 22, 1851 – March 15, 1944) was a Canadian judge.

Frederick Montye Morson was born on October 22, 1851, in Chsmbly, Canada East, to Georgina M. (Kuper) Morson and Frederick Morson. He attended a grammar school in Niagara-on-the-Lake, Ontario; Trinity College, Toronto, where he graduated with a BA in classics in 1871; and Osgoode Hall Law School. He articled at Blake, Kerr & Cassels, was called to the bar of Ontario in 1877, and practised in Hamilton, Ontario, and Toronto before he was appointed to the bench.

Morson was a judge of the county court of York, also called the division court of York, from 1892 to 1931. According to Morson, he decided over 200,000 cases.

Morson died on March 15, 1944. He was a fan of horse racing.
