= Carignan, Quebec =

Municipality in Quebec

Carignan
- City
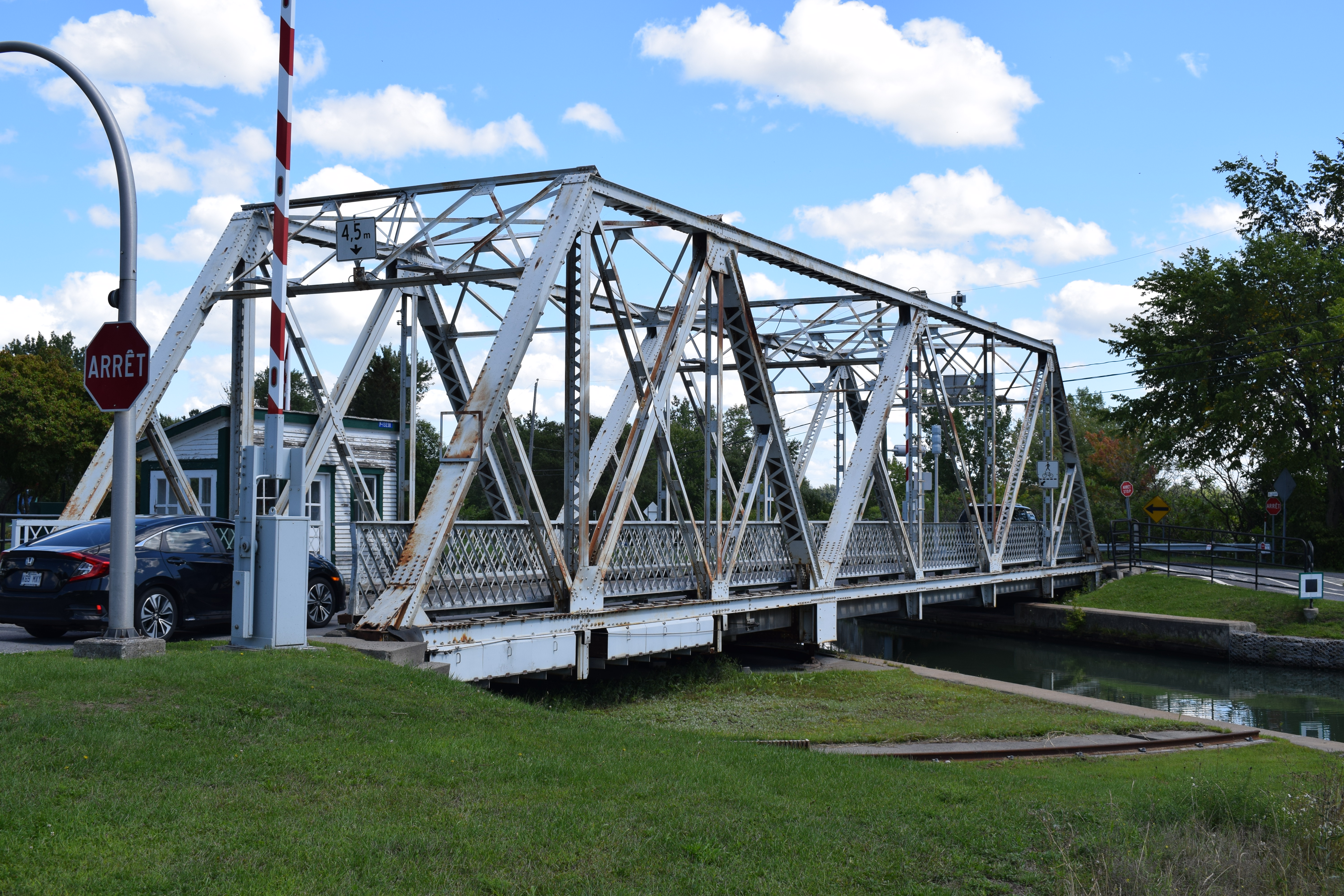
- Bridge over Chambly canal in Carignan.

- Coat of arms
- Motto: "Honneur et patrie" (French for, "Honor and homeland")
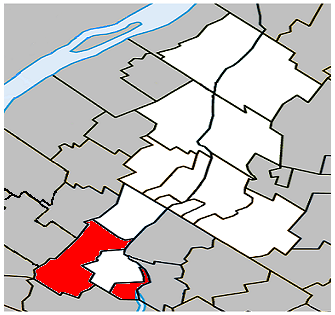
- Location within La Vallée-du-Richelieu RCM.

- Location in southern Quebec.
- Coordinates: 45°27′N 73°18′W
- Country: Canada
- Province: Quebec
- Region: Montérégie
- RCM: La Vallée-du-Richelieu
- Constituted: 1 July 1855

Government
  - Type: Carignan City Council
  - Mayor: Patrick Marquès
  - Federal riding: Beloeil—Chambly
  - Prov. riding: Chambly

Area
  - Total: 65.20 km^{2} (25.17 sq mi)
  - Land: 62.07 km^{2} (23.97 sq mi)

Population (2021)
  - Total: 11,740
  - Density: 189.1/km^{2} (490/sq mi)
  - Pop 2016-2021: ▲24.1%
  - Dwellings: 4,375
- Time zone: UTC−5 (EST)
  - Summer (DST): UTC−4 (EDT)
- Postal code(s): J3L
- Area codes: 450 and 579
- Highways A-10 A-35: R-112; R-223
- Website: www.villedecarignan.org

Carignan (French pronunciation: [kaʁiɲɑ̃]) is a suburban municipality in southwestern Quebec, Canada, on the Richelieu River in La Vallée-du-Richelieu Regional County Municipality, about 27 km (17 mi) from Montreal. The population as of the Canada 2021 Census was 11,740.

Carignan was originally the Village Municipality of Chambly. The village of Chambly was established in 1855, less than 10 years after the municipality of Chambly. In 1965 it was renamed Carignan to honour the Carignan-Salières Regiment, a Savoy regiment working for France, which fought Iroquois aligned with the French.

== History ==
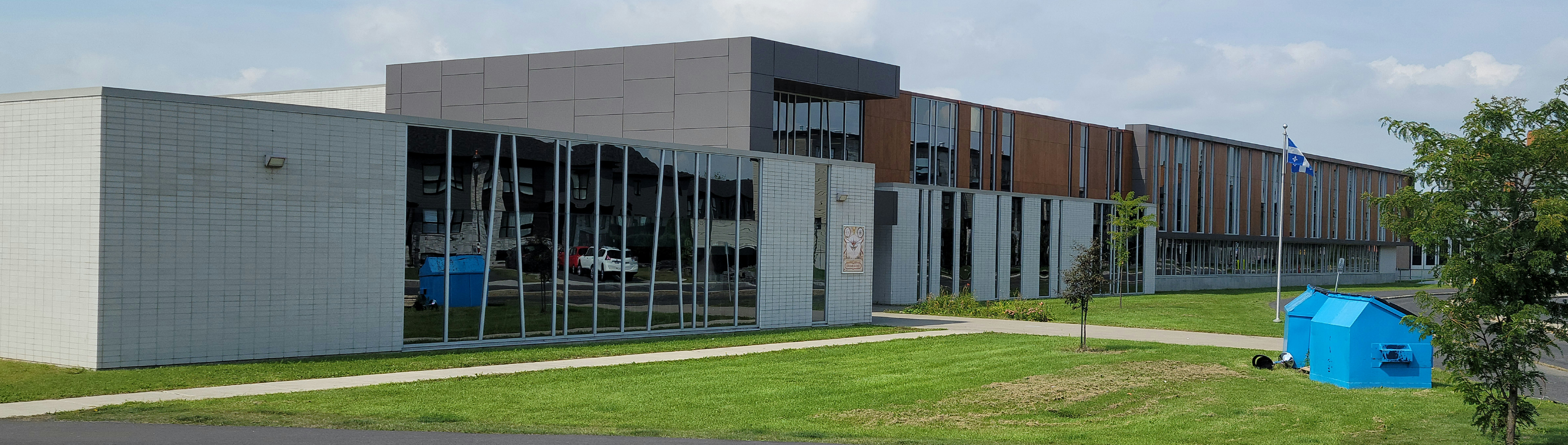
Carignan-Salières Elementary School located near the western edge of town

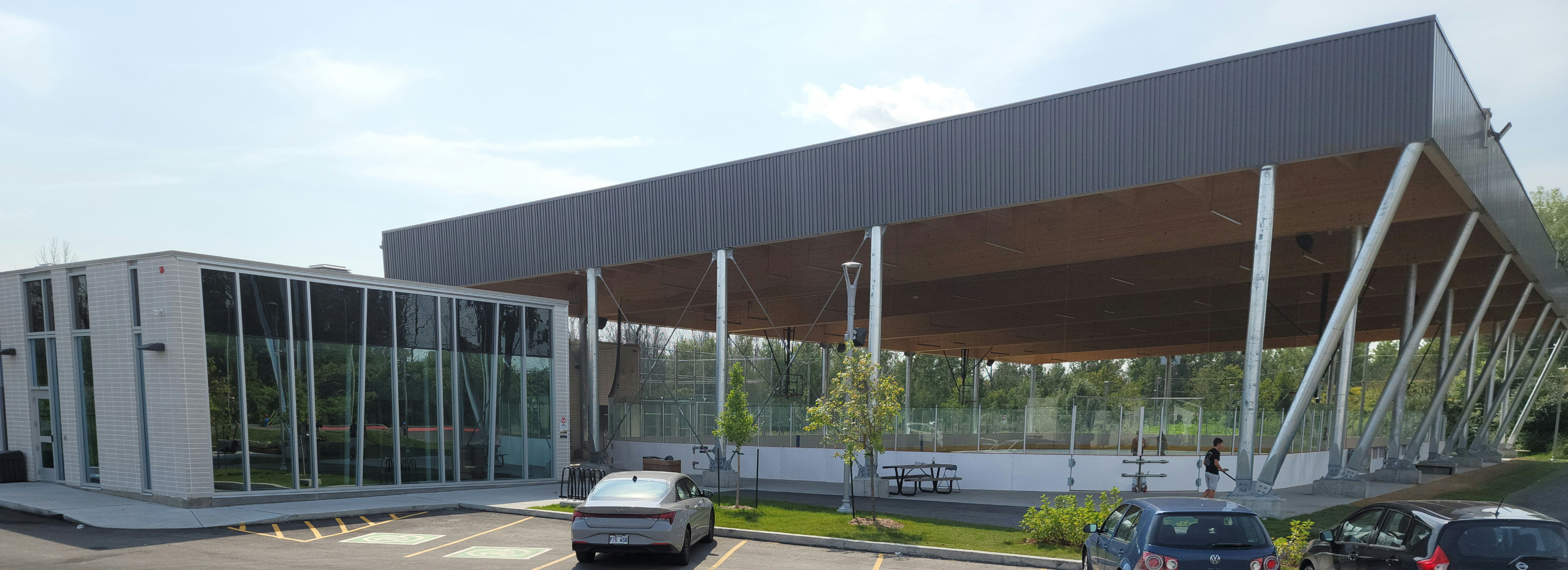
Indoor skating rink on rue de l'École

The current city of Carignan was created on 1 July 1855 on a territory known as Chambly. The original name of Carignan was Saint-Joseph-de-Chambly and it kept this name for more than a century. On 6 June 1871, a large part of Saint-Joseph-de-Chambly broke apart (as well as an important section of Saint-Bruno-de-Montarville) to form the new town of Saint-Basile-le-Grand. Finally, on 31 December 1965, the name Saint-Joseph-de-Chambly was changed to become the new city of Carignan.

== Geography ==
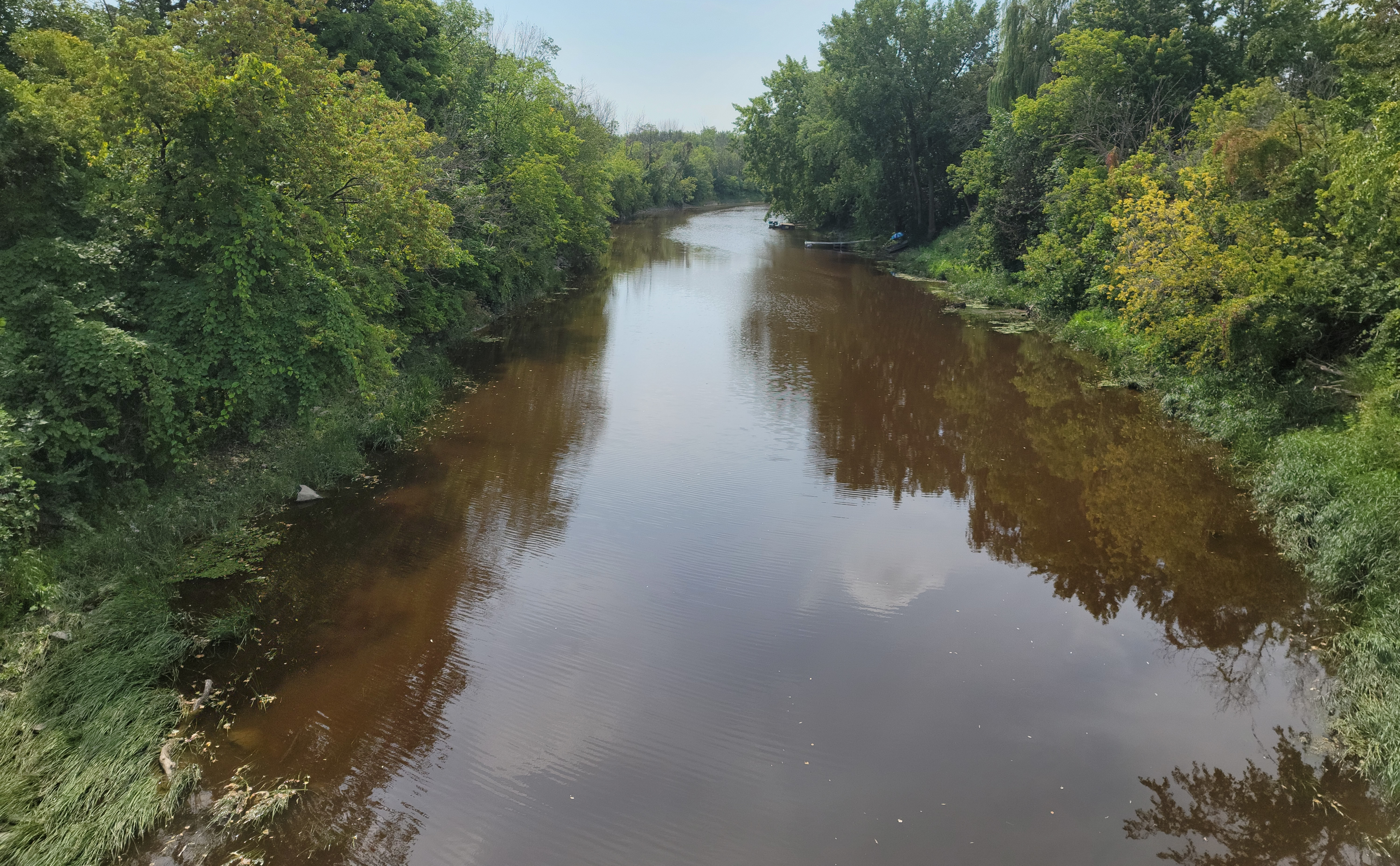
View upstream of the L'Acadie River from the Route 112 bridge linking Chambly and Carignan

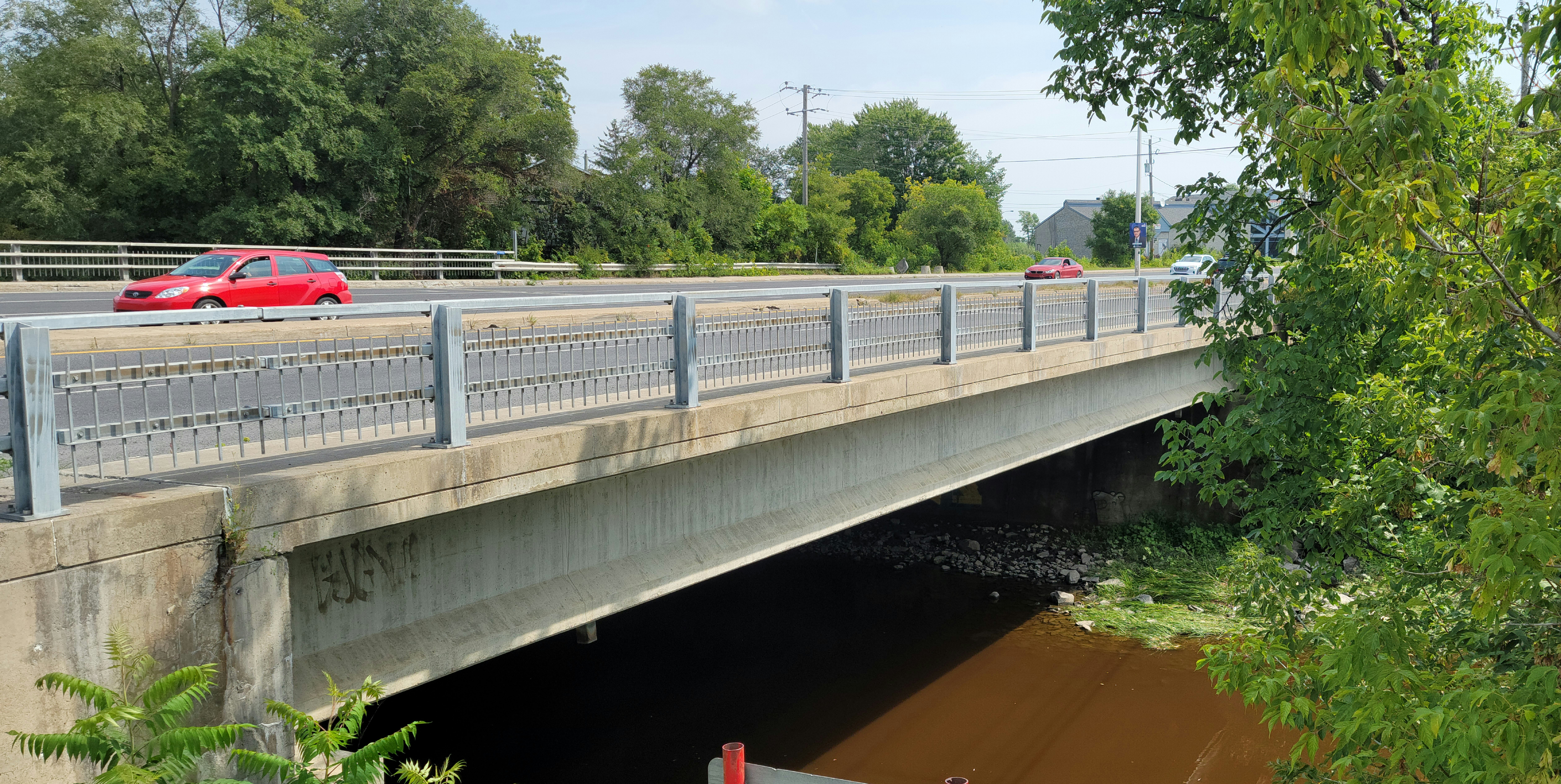
Route 112 bridge (boul. de Périgny de Chambly) spanning the L'Acadie River to connect Chambly and Carignan

Carignan is made up of small urban blocks surrounded by agricultural land where the main crops grown are corn, wheat and soybeans. The municipality borders the Acadia and Richelieu Rivers and these merge, creating a small delta. At their tip, one of the city's four islands: Goyer Island (formerly Grande Isle since it is the largest). Also, Demers Island and Île Aux Lièvres Between the islands, there are channels containing unique flora and fauna. Unusual fact, the municipality is cut (to the east and west) by the city of Chambly in two non-contiguous portions: there is a discontinuity of 1.8 km on the chemin de la Grande-Ligne and 3 km by the Richelieu River.

== Demographics ==
In the 2021 Census of Population conducted by Statistics Canada, Carignan had a population of 11,740 living in 4,274 of its 4,375 total private dwellings, a change of 24.1% from its 2016 population of 9,462. With a land area of 62.07 km^{2} (23.97 sq mi), it had a population density of 189.1/km^{2} (489.9/sq mi) in 2021.

Population trend:

Census	Population	Change (%)
2021	11,740	▲24.1%
2016	9,462	▲18.8%
2011	7,966	▲7.3%
2006	7,426	▲25.5%
2001	5,915	▲5.4%
1996	5,614	▲4.2%
1991	5,386	▲12.6%
1986	4,784	▲5.3%
1981	4,544	▲26.8%
1976	3,585	▲7.3%
1971	3,340	▲12.3%
1966	2,975	▲22.7%
1961	2,424	▲16.9%
1956	2,073	▲46.6%
1951	1,414	▲24.9%
1941	1,132	▲17.2%
1931	966	▼8.3%
1921	1,054	▲4.9%
1911	1,005	▲8.2%
1901	929	▼3.0%
1891	958	▼3.0%
1881	988	▼22.8%
1871	1,279	▼28.4%
1861	1,787	N/A

Mother tongue language (2021)

Language	Population	Pct (%)
French only	9,755	83.1%
English only	590	5.0%
Both English and French	210	1.8%
Other languages	1,045	8.9%

== Infrastructure ==
The CIT Chambly-Richelieu-Carignan provides commuter and local bus services.

== See also ==
- South Shore (Montreal)
- Chambly Basin
- List of cities in Quebec
