= Goyer =

Goyer is a surname. Notable people with the surname include:

- David S. Goyer (born 1965), American film producer, director, and screenwriter
- Jean-Pierre Goyer (1932–2011), Canadian lawyer and politician

== See also ==
- Goyer Island, an island in the Richelieu River in Carignan, Quebec, Canada
