= Carignan City Council =

Governing body in Carignan, Quebec

Carignan City Council (in French: Le conseil municipal de Carignan) is the governing body for the mayor–council government in the city of Carignan, Quebec in the Montérégie region. The council consists of the mayor and six councillors.

== Current Carignan City Council ==
- Patrick Marquès, mayor
- Édith Labrosse, District 1 councillor
- Luc Laforge, District 2 councillor
- Stéphanie Lefebvre, District 3 councillor
- Diane Morneau, District 4 councillor
- Frédéric Martineau, District 5 councillor
- Daniel St-Jean, District 6 councillor
