= Acadia River =

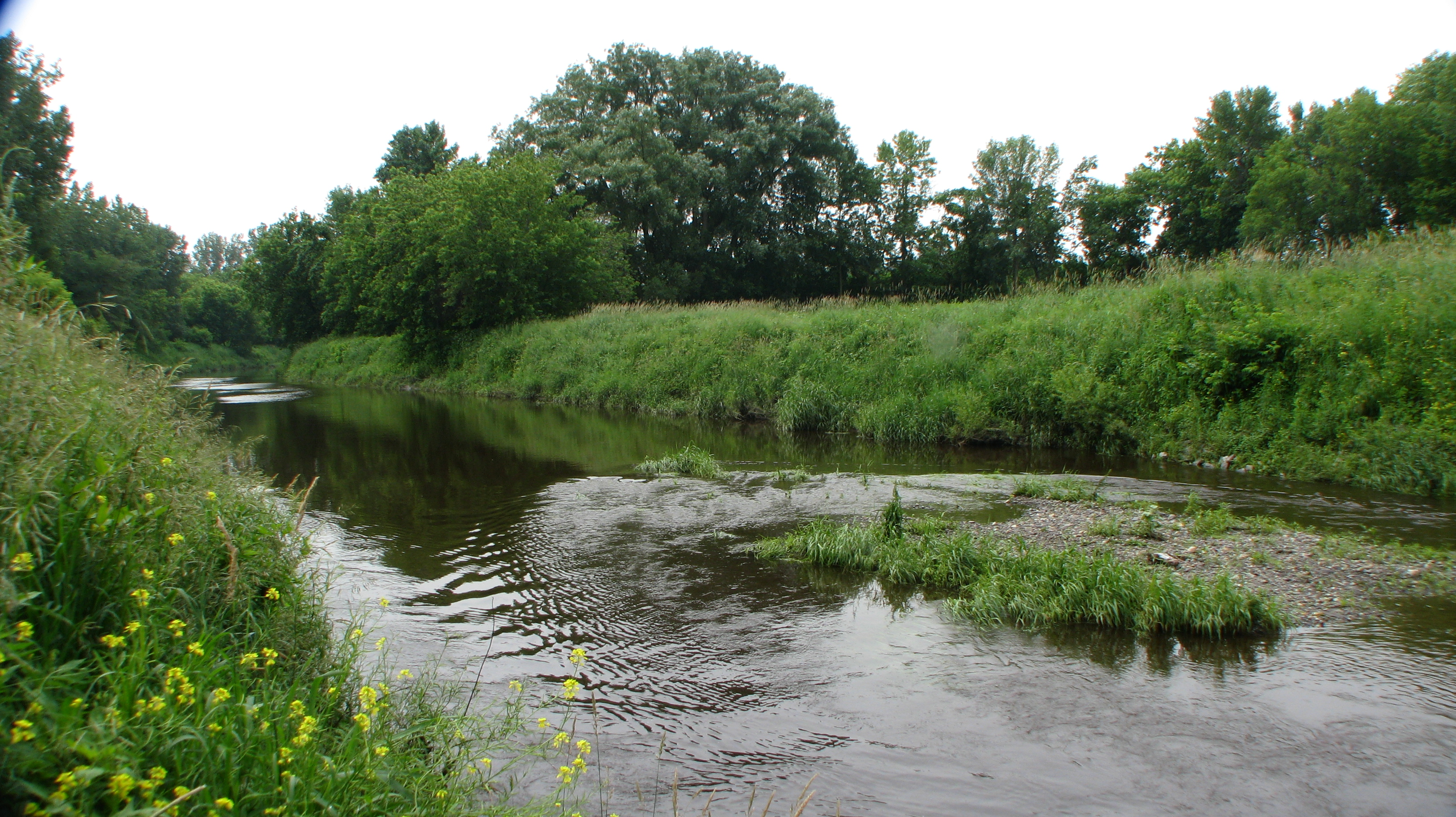
- Rivière L’Acadie in Saint-Jean-sur-Richelieu, Québec

Location
- Country: Canada

Physical characteristics
- Source
  - location: Canada-US border
- Mouth
  - location: Richelieu River, Chambly, Quebec
  - coordinates: 45.48361°N 73.26917°W
- Length: 82 km (51 mi)

Basin features
- River system: St. Lawrence River

The Acadia River flows northerly over 82 km through seven municipalities in La Vallée-du-Richelieu, Les Jardins-de-Napierville, and Le Haut-Richelieu, in Montérégie, on the south shore of St. Lawrence River, in Quebec, Canada. The river empties into the Richelieu River, in Carignan, and skirts the city of Chambly by the north.

== Toponymy ==
Formerly, each segment of the river was named differently during different times.

In 1673, the river was called the "Mount Royal River" (Rivière de Mont Royal, in French) in the first acts of concessions of the seiguenrie of Chambly, located at its mouth. While the first settlers in the southern part (high) designate the "River of Morels" (French: Rivière des Morelles). The wild plant that grows on the banks of the river, which produces black berries, and that designation was altered from its original form to become "River Morales" (Rivière des Morales) in the early 19th century.

Under the British government, after the conquest of New France, the new settlers use the toponym "Montreal River", a translation of "River of Mount Royal". Upon arrival of the first French settlers in the Haut-Richelieu, the river was named "River of Montreal" (Rivière de Montréal) and "Little River Montreal" (Petite rivière de Montréal).

From the mid-19th century, the segment of the river in the area of Sainte-Marguerite-de-Blairfindie was designated "River of Acadia" since the exiled Acadians settled after there 1768, but the segments downstream and upstream kept their name of "Little River Montreal". The settlers named their adopted land "La Cadie", "La Petite Cadie" (Little Cadie), or "La Nouvellle Cadie" (New Cadie) in memory of their origins from Acadia.

=== Toponym ===
In 1524, the Florentine Giovanni da Verrazzano (1485? -1528) explored the east coast of North America. In 1548 on a map by Giacomo Gastaldi, "Arcadia" began to designate the area of Maryland and Virginia. According to Marcel Trudel, a historian and teacher, Arcadia is a "place name that we carry to the north and turn under the influence of Mikmaq sounding in Acadia". The name refers to a region of ancient Greece, the rich mythological and literary plan, often described as the land in excellence of serenity and happiness. In 1604, Samuel de Champlain visited Acadia in the name of the King of France. It sets the current spelling by dropping the letter R. At the time, the place name "Acadie" is assigned to the peninsula of Nova Scotia. In 1605, Port Royal was founded by the French, which started the colonization of Acadia, which spans much of the 17th century.

In 1713, under the Treaty of Utrecht, Acadia was ceded to Britain. In the mid-18th century, the "Great Upheaval" occurs when those who refused to pay allegiance to the Crown Brythonic were deported to the British colonies of the American coast. The first wave of deportations, which occurred between 1755 and 1757, touched nearly ten thousand Acadians. Finally, in 1763, the Treaty of Paris finally gave Acadia to the British. Today, Acadia essentially corresponds to regions of New Brunswick, Nova Scotia, and Prince Edward Island that are inhabited by descendants of the inhabitants of the former French Acadia.

=== Registration ===
In 1965, at the request of the Historical Society of the Richelieu Valley, the Geographic Board of Canada officially registered its toponym registry the hydronym "L'Acadie River. However, "Little Montreal River remains used by the people of the concerned sectors and in the names of the concessions designations (rows).

The name "River Acadia" was officially registered on December 5, 1968, to the bank of placenames of the Commission de toponymie du Quebec.

== Geography ==
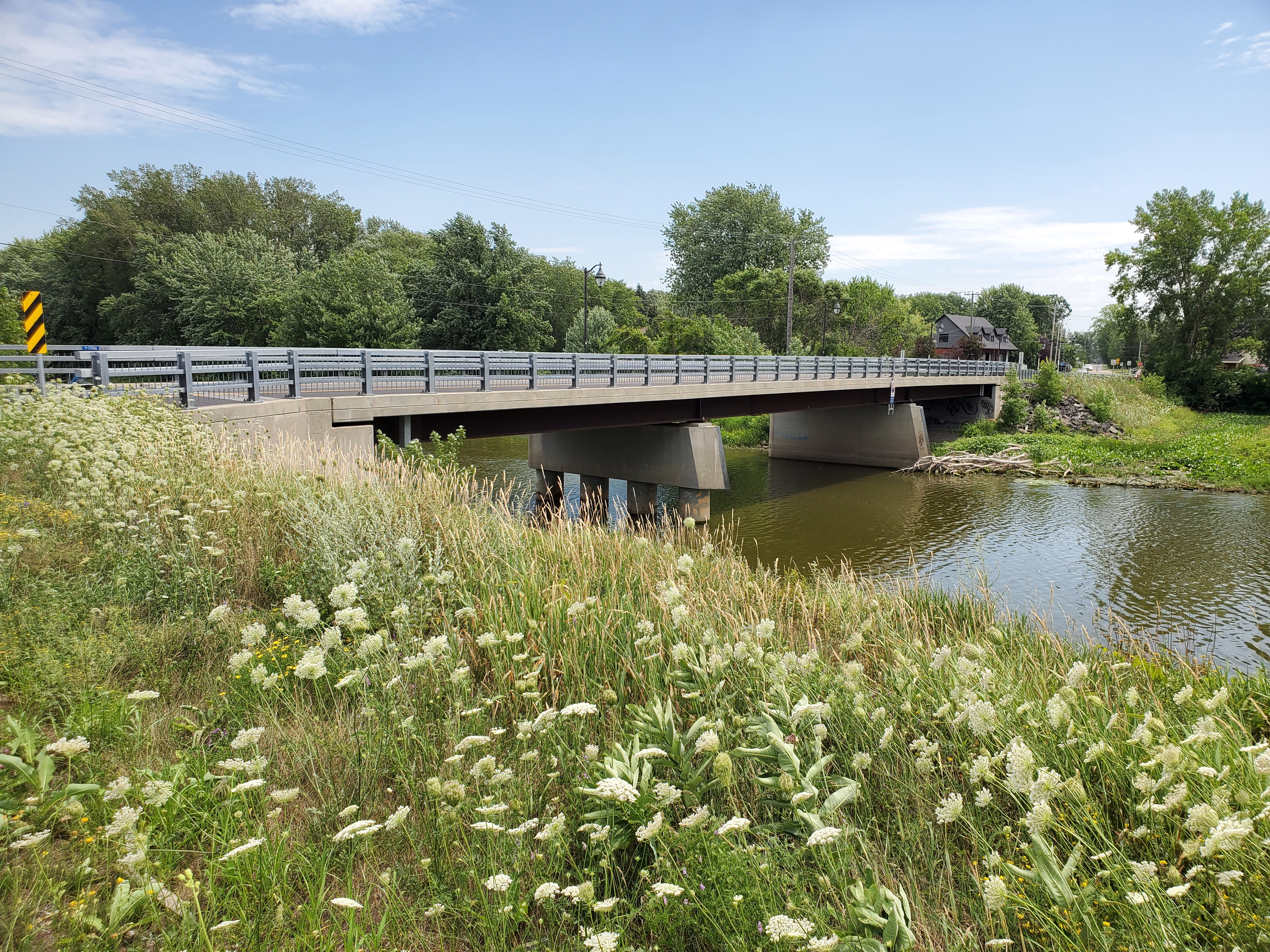
Road bridge spanning the Acadia River, connecting Île Goyer and Route 223.

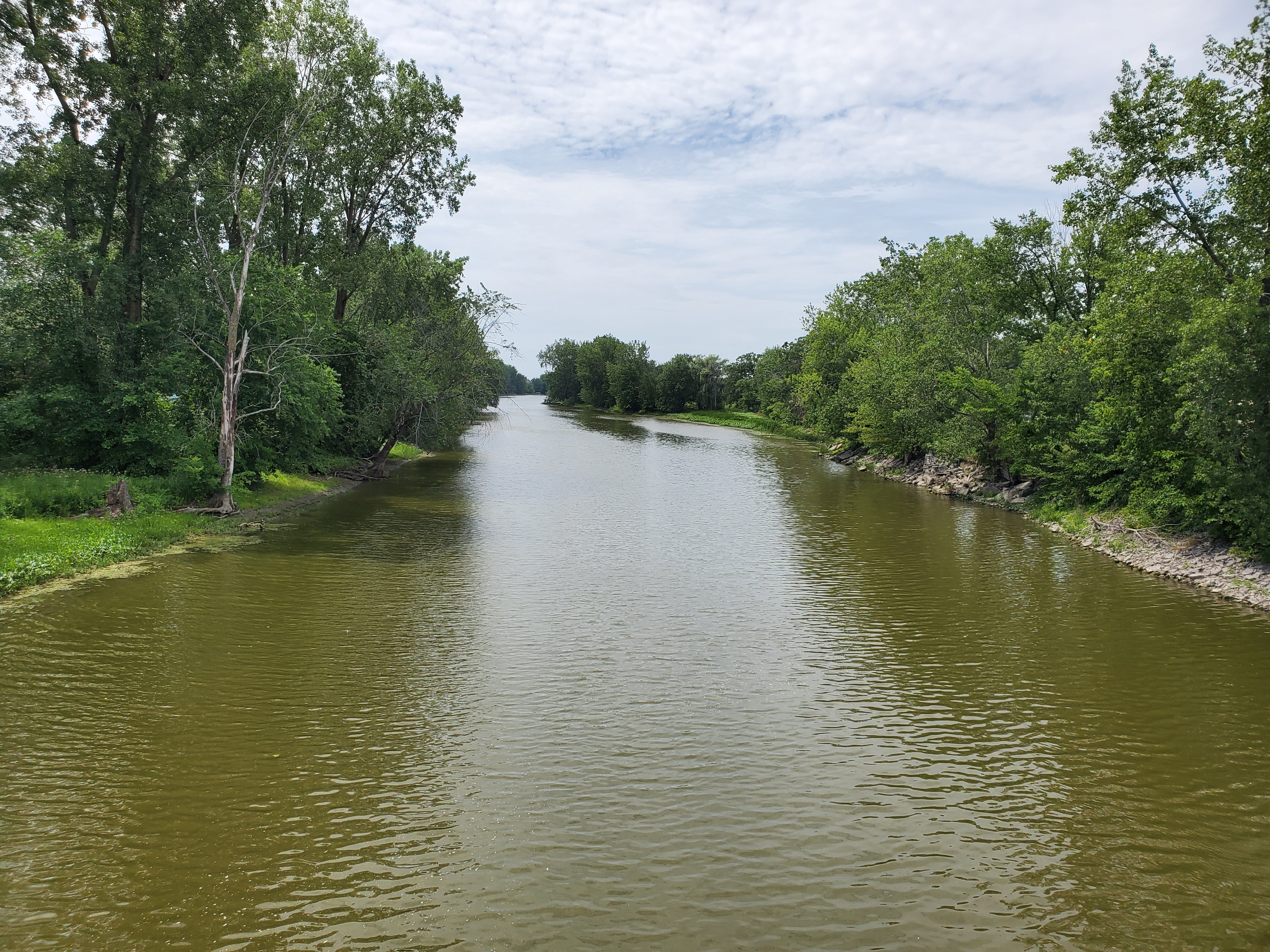
Rivière l'Acadie, seen downstream from the bridge leading to Île Goyer, at 1.1 km from its mouth

The Acadia River takes it source from some streams at the foot of mountains near the Canada-United States border in the Hemmingford Township at Hemmingford. It flows north, almost in parallel to the Richelieu River (on west side). Besides passing through some villages (Napierville, Acadia and Chambly), Acadia River flows through agricultural and forest environments. The river is bordered by campaigns decorated with historical and modern buildings. Formerly, from Saint-Cyprien-de-Napierville and towards its mouth, heritage routes ran along on each side of the river route, but some segments of roads are now extinct. In winter, ice roads on the river allowed transportation vehicles drawn by animals or on foot, by avoiding cast parallel roads sometimes poorly managed and unplowed.

The course of the river flows through seven municipalities (or cities): Hemmingford, Saint-Patrice-de-Sherrington (where it flows eastward) Saint-Cyprien-de-Napierville, Napierville, Saint-Jean-sur-Richelieu (Saint-Luc and Acadia sector), Carignan and Chambly.

Description of the route of the river

Municipality (city)	Course of the river (km)	Notes	Major tributaries of the streams Acadie River
Hemmingford	11 km	The river begins near the Canada-United States border in the first rank of Canton Hemmingford (east side of Hemmingford) and flows north. The river bypasses the watershed of Lacolle River by crossing the second and third row. Then, at the north of the village of Hemmingford, Quebec, the river turns north-east	In Hemmingford, Quebec, river recovers Odel Creek in the 5th (north of town), Kyle Burns and Gagné.
Saint-Patrice-de-Sherrington, Quebec	7.7 km	Between the west of Saint-Patrice-de-Sherrington, Quebec, by the first rank, the Acadie River flows straight to the East. It veers to the southeast in the 4th to enter Saint-Cyprien, Quebec. It travels 7.7 kilometers in total (measured by water) in Saint-Patrice-de-Sherrington, Quebec	Brooks: Petite bagnole (Small car), Beaudin-Dumouchel (including Boulerice Creek), Boston, Des Terres Noires, Bettez and Lavoie.
Napierville, Quebec and Saint-Cyprien-de-Napierville, Quebec (former parish of Saint-Cyprien)	16 km	The river enters Napierville, Quebec, by the 9th concession (or Rang Saint-André) in flowing eastward for 4.5 km until the "Concession West Little River Montreal" (former name of the Acadie River). The river then branches to 90 degrees, where it will flow northward 11.6 km (measured by water) through the village of Napierville, Quebec. It continues in the West Concession Little Montreal River where it turns north-east to enter in l'Acadie. The river cuts the Quebec Autoroute 15 and Quebec Route 217 in Napierville, Quebec	Brooks: Charbonneau, North, Maria, Small discharge Desauniers, Tremblay, BAHEU Remillard, Trorc, Paradise and Simioni.
Saint-Jean-sur-Richelieu, Quebec (Sector: Acadie)	9.9 km	In its journey to the north, the river enters in l'Acadie, merged in 2001 to Saint-Jean-sur-Richelieu, Quebec, by SE 1st Concession of the Montreal River. the river then runs through a segment of 5.4 km (direct line or 7.4 km following current) through the village. then in its course, the river establishes 1.5 km (direct line or 2.5 km by water) the boundary between Saint-Luc area and l'Acadi.	Brooks: Roman-Moreau (flowing westward from the Saint-Luc area), Marell, of walnut, Brunelle, Clément-Beaudin, Rusty, Prairies, and the mid Brosseau.
Saint-Jean-sur-Richelieu, Quebec (Saint-Luc area)	4.5 km	In the Saint-Luc area, the river passes through 2.2 km (direct line or 4.5 km by water) rank Côte Saint-Louis-de-Gonzague, northbound.	The Roman-Moreau Creek flows especially in the Saint-Luc area, and flows into l'Acadie.
Carignan, Quebec	16.5 km	The river enters Carignan, Quebec, by the 1st Concession SE of Little Montreal River where the river crosses Highway 15 (Quebec) and branches off to the east. In Carignan, Quebec, the river traverses a first segment of 4.4 km (measured in a straight line or 8.6 km by water) up to the limit of Chambly. Then, the river marks the boundary of Chambly, Quebec and Carignan, Quebec, for 2.7 km in a straight line (or 4.3 km following the meandering water courses). At the northern edge of Chambly, the river continues its course 3.6 km to the northeast in a straight line to its mouth. Thus Acadie River fully coutourne the City of Chambly, Quebec, without ever entering in its territory	Brooks: Squire and Massé. It flows south from Saint-Basile-le-Grand, Quebec, and empties into the Acadie River, opposite of the island Demers, 1.9 km downstream from the mouth the Acadie River.

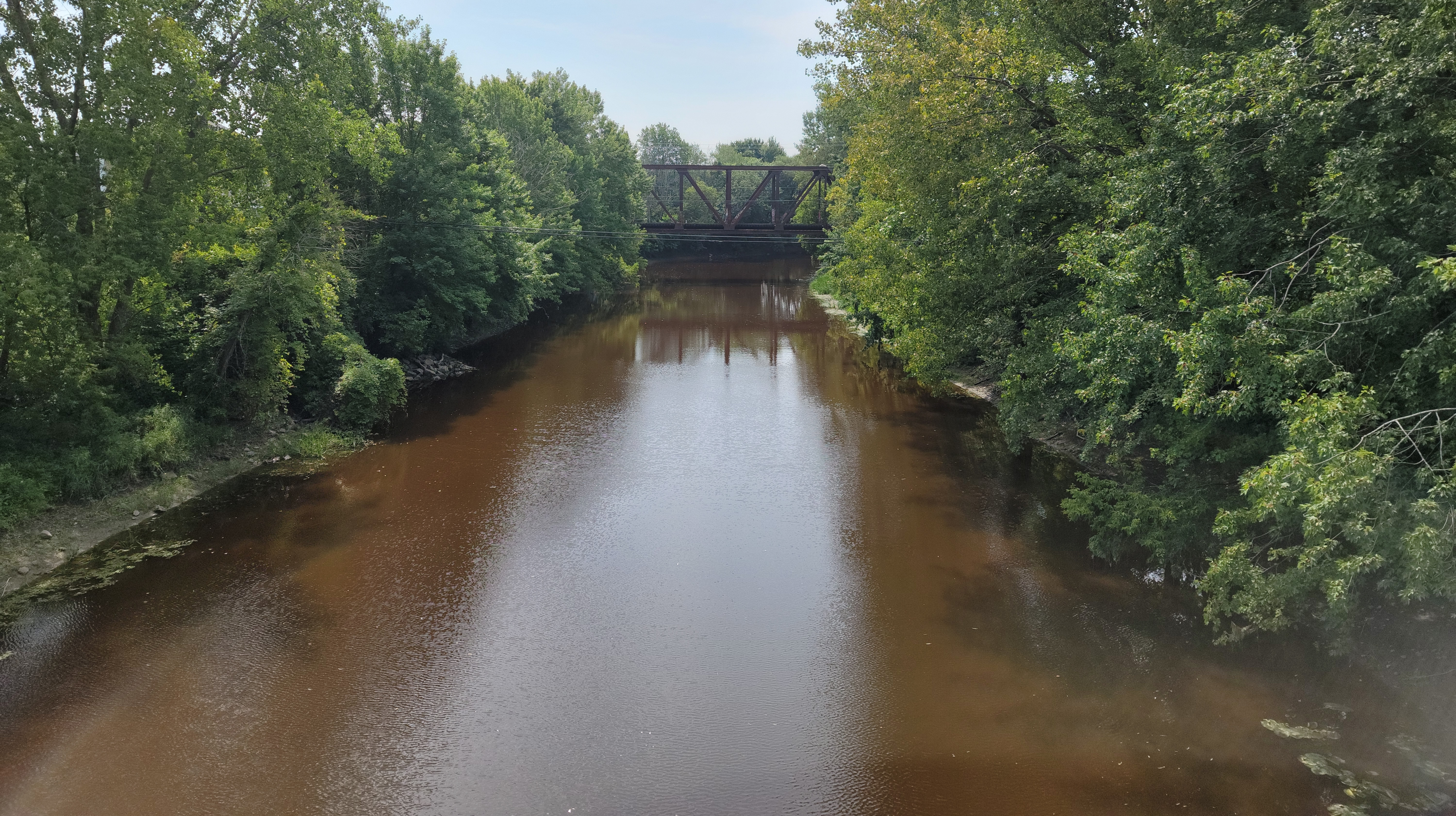
View of the L'Acadie River upstream from the Marie-Anne Street pedestrian bridge (Carignan). Several segments of this river are navigable.

The course of the river is meandering between the village of Acadia and Chambly Road (Quebec Route 112) at the limit of Chambly and Carignan. This segment of the river is ideal for spring flooding or heavy floods of the river, because of the low gradient.

In Saint-Jean-sur-Richelieu (Saint-Luc area), the natural environment along the river l'Acadie with an area of 645,834 sq.ft (6 ha) is an ecological heritage. In a conservation goal, the sector is subject to specific rules forbidding including any tree cutting, all new construction and all remblaiement.

Acadie River through the historic village of Acadie. Acadians, subject to a large deportation, generally from Boston, had settled in this area in 1782. They built the parish church, near Acadie River.

Mouth of the river

After touring the montérégienne plain, Acadia river empties into the Richelieu River at the mouth of the Chambly Basin; the mouth of the river is part of Carignan. In the last segment of its course, the river flows along the road 223 (Bellerive path) that bypasses by the North the Demers Island and Grande île (Great Island), located at the north of the Chambly Basin.

== See also ==
- La Vallée-du-Richelieu
- Les Jardins-de-Napierville
- Le Haut-Richelieu
- Richelieu River
- List of Quebec rivers
