= Saint-Mathias-sur-Richelieu =

- Municipality
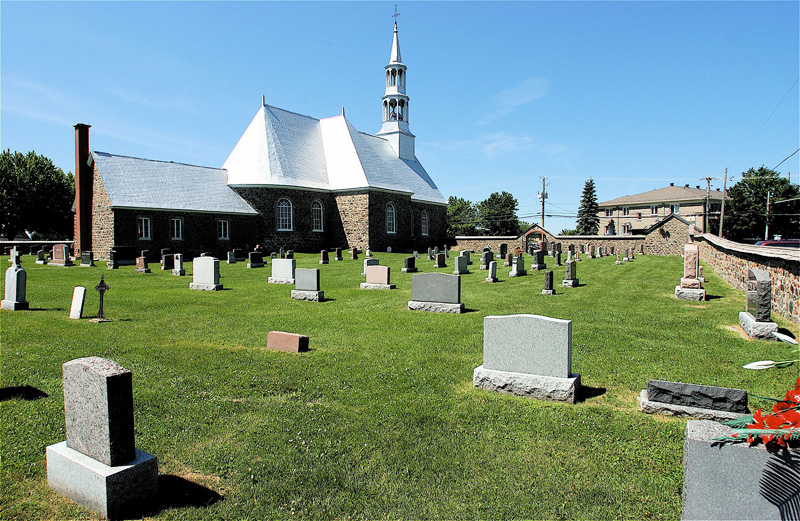
- Saint-Mathias-sur-Richelieu's cemetery

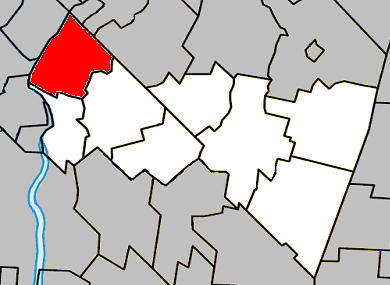
- Location within Rouville RCM

- Location in southern Quebec
- Coordinates: 45°28′N 73°16′W
- Country: Canada
- Province: Quebec
- Region: Montérégie
- RCM: Rouville
- Constituted: July 1, 1855

Government
  - Mayor: Sylvain Casavant
  - Federal riding: Beloeil—Chambly
  - Prov. riding: Chambly

Area
  - Total: 50.10 km^{2} (19.34 sq mi)
  - Land: 47.02 km^{2} (18.15 sq mi)

Population (2021)
  - Total: 4,544
  - Density: 96.6/km^{2} (250/sq mi)
  - Pop 2016-2021: ▲0.3%
  - Dwellings: 2,022
- Time zone: UTC−5 (EST)
  - Summer (DST): UTC−4 (EDT)
- Postal code(s): J3L 6Z5
- Area codes: 450 and 579
- Highways A-10: R-112; R-133
- Website: www.saint-mathias -sur-richelieu.org

Saint-Mathias-sur-Richelieu (French pronunciation: [sɛ̃ matjas syʁ ʁiʃ(ə)ljø], lit. 'Saint Mathias on Richelieu') is a municipality in the Canadian province of Quebec. It is located within the Rouville Regional County Municipality in the Montérégie region on the Richelieu River. The population as of the Canada 2021 Census was 4,544.

== Demographics ==
=== Population ===
Population trend:

Census	Population	Change (%)
2021	4,544	▲0.3%
2016	4,531	▼1.9%
2011	4,618	▲2.5%
2006	4,506	▲8.6%
2001	4,149	▲3.4%
1996	4,014	▲13.0%
1991	3,553	▲15.9%
1986	3,065	▲4.6%
1981	2,929	▲49.0%
1976	1,966	▲18.3%
1971	1,662	▲14.0%
1966	1,458	▲38.2%
1961	1,055	▲4.2%
1956	1,012	▲0.9%
1951	1,003	▲46.2%
1941	686	▲3.9%
1931	660	▼10.2%
1921	735	▲1.8%
1911	722	▲9.9%
1901	657	▼9.4%
1891	725	▼15.0%
1881	853	▼9.2%
1871	939	▼48.7%
1861	1,829	N/A

=== Language ===
Mother tongue language (2021)

Language	Population	Pct (%)
French only	4,285	94.5%
English only	100	2.2%
Both English and French	45	1.0%
Other languages	90	2.0%

== Notable people ==
Michel Jean - Anchorman and journalist TVA Nouvelles and Le Canale Nouvelles (LCN) a Quebec-based news network

== See also ==
- List of municipalities in Quebec
