= Chambly, Quebec =

Chambly
- City
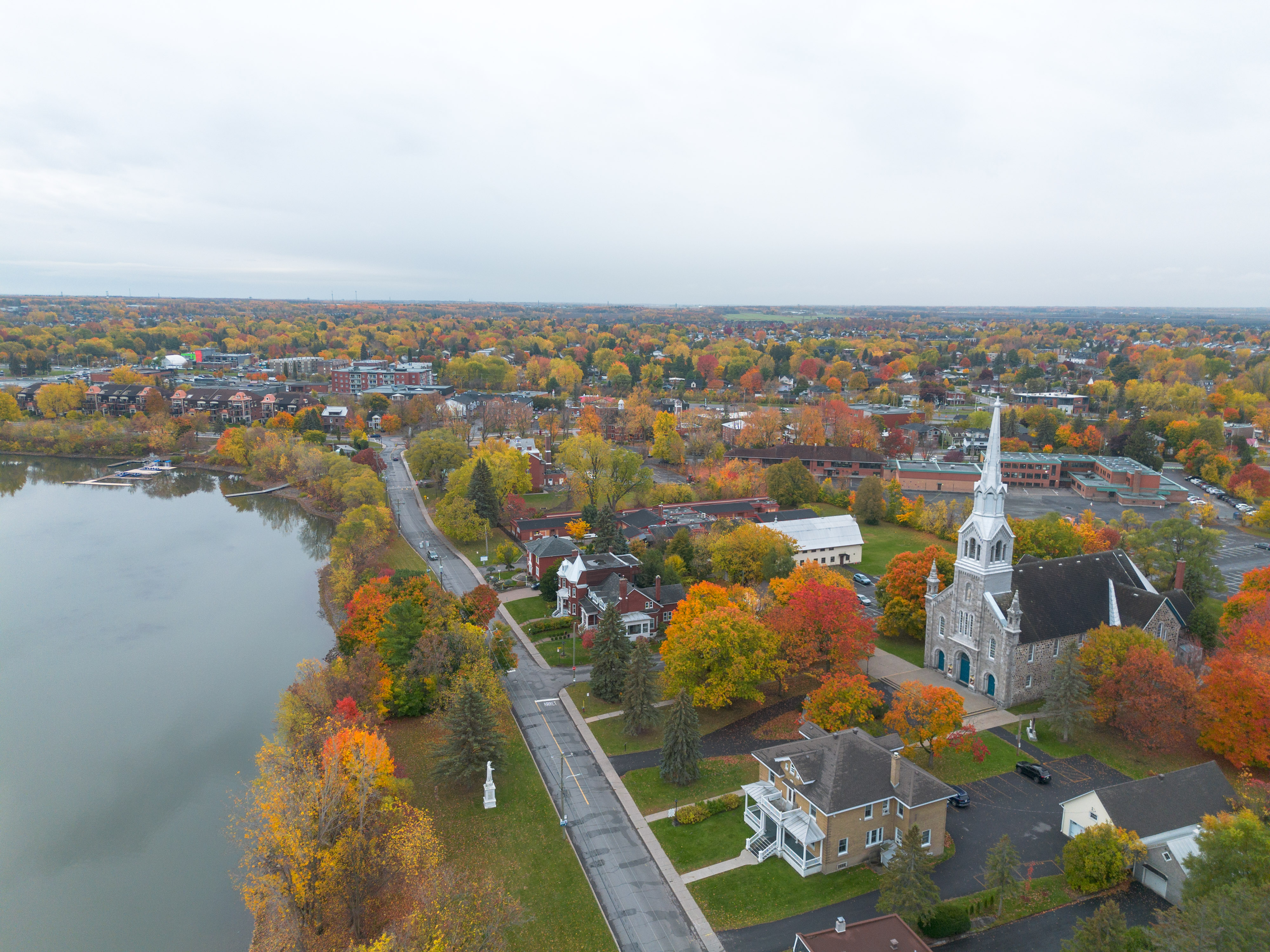
- Chambly in 2025

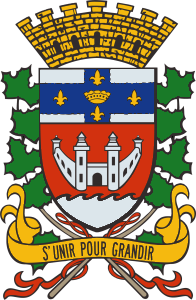
- Coat of arms

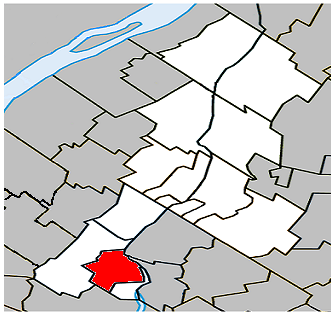
- Location within La Vallée-du-Richelieu RCM.

- Location in southern Quebec.
- Coordinates: 45°27′N 73°17′W
- Country: Canada
- Province: Quebec
- Region: Montérégie
- RCM: La Vallée-du-Richelieu
- Constituted: October 26, 1849
- Amalgamated: September 18, 1965

Government
  - Mayor: Alexandra Labbé
  - Federal riding: Beloeil—Chambly
  - Prov. riding: Chambly

Area
  - Total: 27.60 km^{2} (10.66 sq mi)
  - Land: 25.08 km^{2} (9.68 sq mi)

Population (2021)
  - Total: 31,444
  - Density: 1,253.7/km^{2} (3,247/sq mi)
  - Pop 2016-2021: ▲8%
  - Dwellings: 12,609
- Time zone: UTC−5 (EST)
  - Summer (DST): UTC−4 (EDT)
- Postal code(s): J3L
- Area codes: 450 and 579
- Highways A-10 A-35: R-112
- Website: www.ville.chambly.qc.ca

Chambly (French pronunciation: [ʃɑ̃bli]) is an off-island suburb of Montreal in southwestern Quebec, Canada. It is located in the Montérégie region, inland from the South Shore of the Saint Lawrence River.

It was formed from the merger in 1965 of Fort-Chambly (formerly Chambly-Canton prior to 1952) and the old city of Chambly (formerly Chambly-Basin prior to 1952, and earlier sometimes called Bassin-de-Chambly).

== History ==
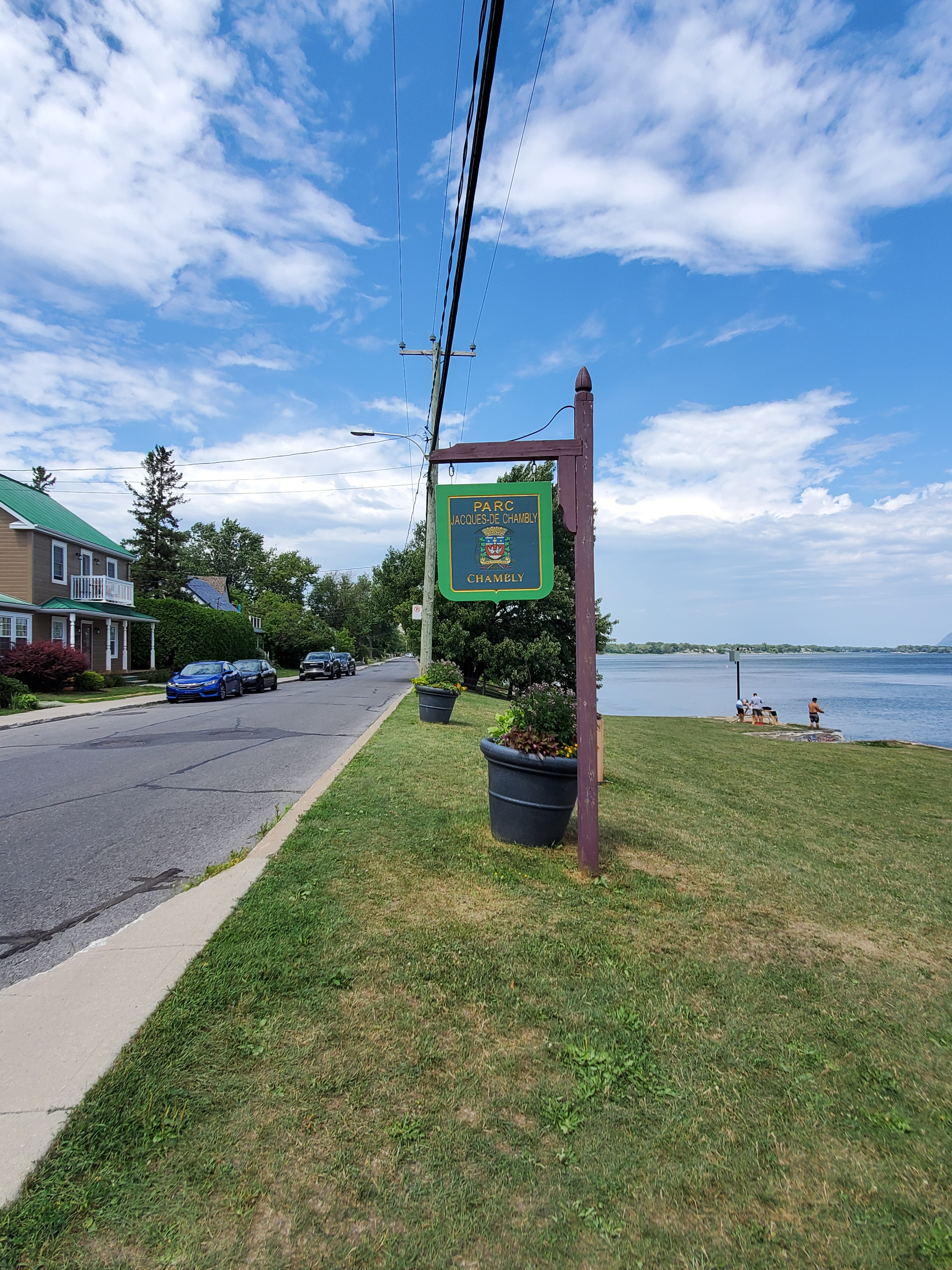
Sign indicating Jacques-De Chambly park, rue Martel, Chambly

Descendants of European immigrants have lived in Chambly since the 17th century, but Chambly was not incorporated as a city until 1965.

Samuel de Champlain passed through the area that came to be the site of the town of Chambly, QC, in 1609., when he wrote the following in his journal:

The approach to the rapids is a sort of lake into which the water flows down, and it is about three leagues in circumference. Nearby are meadows where no Indians live, by reason of the wars. At the rapids there is very little water, but it flows with great swiftness, and there are many rocks and boulders, so that the Indians cannot go up by water; but on the way back they run them very nicely. All this region is very level and full of forests, vines and butternut trees. No Christian has ever visited this land and we had all the misery of the world trying to paddle the river upstream.

Fort Chambly was captured by American forces on October 20, 1775, during the American Invasion of Canada of 1775–76, it was held until the spring of 1776 when it was evacuated and burned, as the Americans retreated southward to Fort Ticonderoga. Subsequently, prisoners-of-war from the Continental Army, including Colonel William Stacy, were held at Fort Chambly until the end of the American Revolutionary War.

During the occupation the 1st Canadian Regiment, an Extra Continental regiment, was raised by James Livingston to support Colonial efforts in the American Revolutionary War during the invasion of Quebec. Livingston recruited men from Chambly, Quebec as early as September 1775, but a formal regimental designation was made by Richard Montgomery on November 20, 1775, with recognition by the Second Continental Congress following on January 8, 1776. The regiment, which never approached its authorized size of 1,000 men, saw action primarily in the Canadian theater and New York, and was disbanded on January 1, 1781.

The College of Chambly was chartered on March 21, 1835, in Lower Canada.

=== Fort Chambly ===
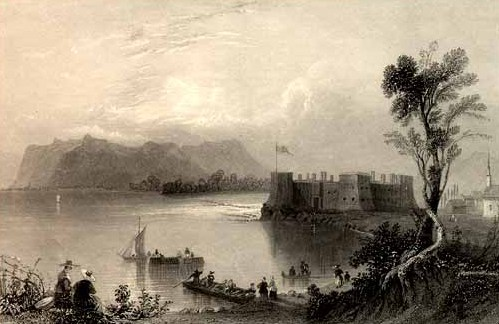
Fort Chambly, sitting on the Richelieu River

Chambly is home to the massive Fort Chambly, built with local stone between 1709 and 1711 in the style of Vauban's classic French fortifications. It was built at the mouth of a large basin, on the site of successive wooden forts dating back to 1665. Fort Chambly was the largest in a series of fortifications on the shores of what was known as the Iroquois River (later known as the Chambly River, finally becoming the Richelieu River in the nineteenth century). Originally called Fort Saint-Louis, it soon came to be known by the name of its first commanding officer, Jacques de Chambly, to whom the surrounding seigniory was granted in 1672. It was intended to protect New France in general (and Montreal in specific) from attack from indigenous peoples and the English. Today, the fort is run by Parks Canada and is designated a National Historic Site of Canada, and houses a museum and interpretive centre, and hosts historical re-enactments of military drills (as well as a number of contemporary cultural events).

A small local population clustered around the fort, and the entire area eventually became known as Chambly as well. Among the buildings around the Fort was St. Stephen's Anglican Church, which was built to serve the soldiers in garrison as well as the local Loyalist and English settler population.

=== Chambly Canal ===
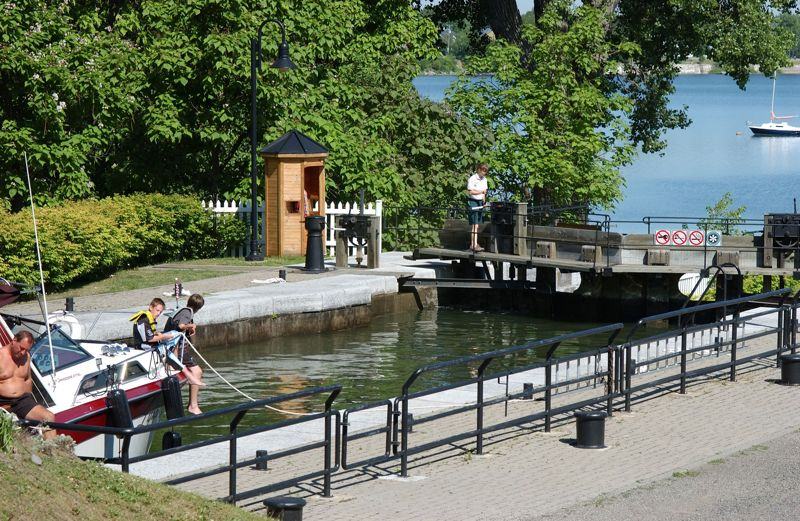
Chambly Canal lock

Chambly is also known for the Chambly Canal, a National Historic Site run by Parks Canada. It was built in 1843 to bypass several kilometers of successive Richelieu River rapids between the towns of Chambly, QC, and Saint-Jean-sur-Richelieu. Part of a series of waterways connecting the Saint Lawrence River and New York City, Chambly Canal was built to facilitate commercial traffic between Canada and the United States.

Trade dwindled after World War I, and as of the 1970s, traffic has been replaced by recreational vessels. Today the canal is enjoyed by tourists and more than 7,000 pleasure boats in the summer, and ice skaters in the winter.

St-Joseph of Chambly Church, at 164 rue Martel, was built between 1880 and 1881. The parish was founded in 1665.

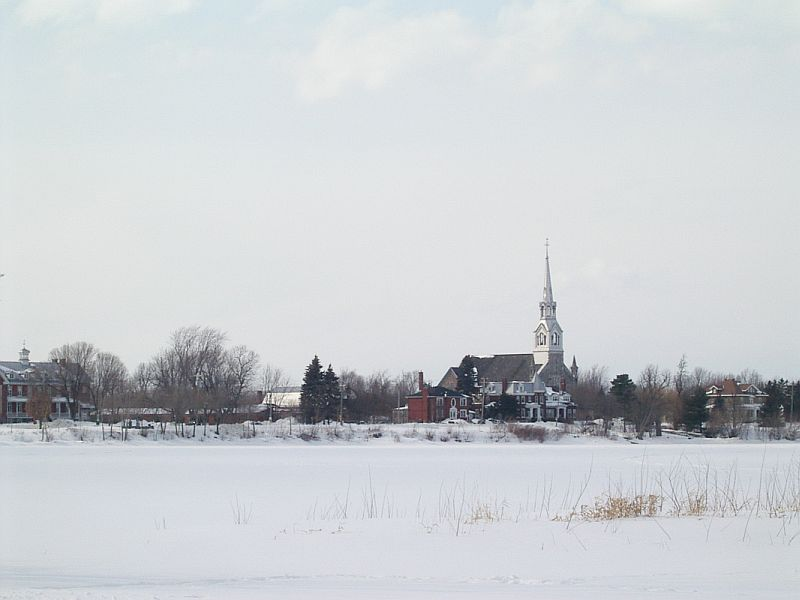
Chambly's Church St-Joseph, viewed in winter from the Basin

== Geography ==
It sits on the Richelieu River in the Regional County Municipality of La-Vallée-du-Richelieu, at 45°27′00″N 73°17′27″W.

== Demographics ==
In the 2021 Census of Population conducted by Statistics Canada, Chambly had a population of 31,444 living in 12,405 of its 12,609 total private dwellings, a change of 8% from its 2016 population of 29,120. With a land area of 25.08 km^{2} (9.68 sq mi), it had a population density of 1,253.7/km^{2} (3,247.2/sq mi) in 2021.

Population trend:

Census	Population	Change (%)
2021	31,444	▲8.0%
2016	29,120	▲13.9%
2011	25,571	▲13.1%
2006	22,608	▲11.1%
2001	20,342	▲3.2%
1996	19,716	▲24.1%
1991	15,893	▲23.5%
1986	12,869	▲5.6%
1981	12,190	▲3.2%
1976	11,815	▲3.0%
1971	11,469	▲6.2%
1966	10,798	N/A

Mother tongue language (2021)

Language	Population	Pct (%)
French	26,985	86.6%
English	1,295	4.2%
English and French	550	1.8%
Other languages	1,985	6.4%

== Economy ==
Chambly is home to the annual Festival Bières et Saveurs de Chambly (Chambly Beers and Flavours Festival), an annual beer and local food festival that takes place every Labour Day weekend since 2002. Minors are allowed to attend, but must be accompanied by a parent or guardian at all times. There is a special zone in the festival area dedicated just for minors as well. The festival takes place just outside of Fort Chambly.

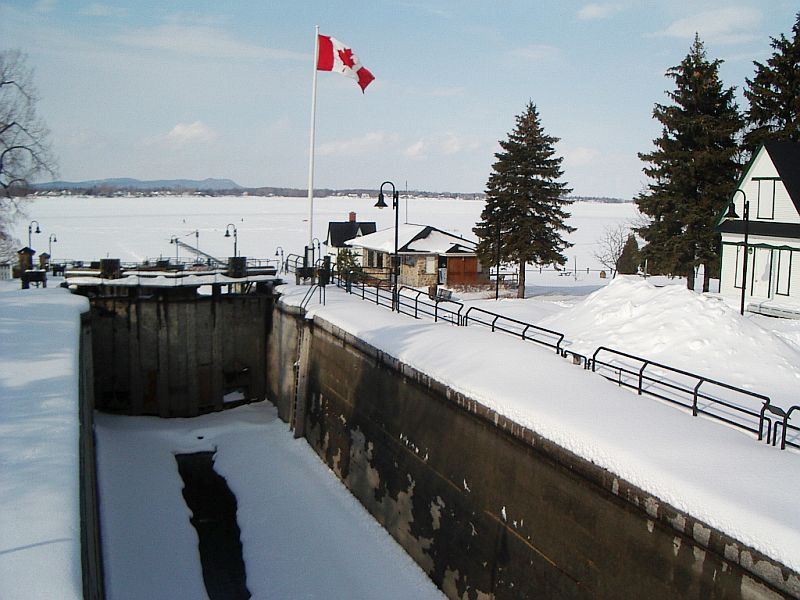
Chambly Canal locks, viewed in winter

== Infrastructure ==
The exo Chambly-Richelieu-Carignan region provides commuter and local bus services.

== Education ==
In English, the South Shore Protestant Regional School Board and later the Richelieu Valley School Board previously served the municipality. Currently Chambly is served by the Riverside School Board and specifically by William Latter Elementary School. Anglophone secondary students in Chambly are zoned for Heritage Regional High School in Longueuil's Saint-Hubert borough.

In French, the Commission scolaire des Patriotes serves Chambly, with the following schools located in the municipality:

- École De Bourgogne (Elementary)
- École De Salaberry (Elementary)
- École Jacques-De Chambly (Elementary)
- École Sainte-Marie (Elementary)
- École Madeleine-Brousseau (Elementary)
- École secondaire de Chambly (Secondary 1, 2 and 3)

== Media ==
Chambly is currently served by a local weekly newspaper called the "Journal de Chambly", first published in 1966.

A small daily news sheet called Chambly Matin also maintains a journalistic presence on the internet reporting on local issues.

== Notable people ==
- Emma Albani – Opera singer
- Michael Duheme – Police officer, 25th Commissioner of the RCMP
- Mathieu Joseph – Ice hockey player
- Georges Larivière – Professor, Writer, Ice hockey coach
- Ricardo Larrivée – Television personality
- Robert Lebel – Former mayor of Chambly, Hockey Hall of Fame inductee
- Étienne Lucier – Fur trader
- Étienne Provost – Fur trader
- Jacqueline Simoneau – Olympian
- André Rousseau – Deputy minister

== See also ==
- List of cities in Quebec
