= La Vallée-du-Richelieu Regional County Municipality =

La Vallée-du-Richelieu
- Regional county municipality
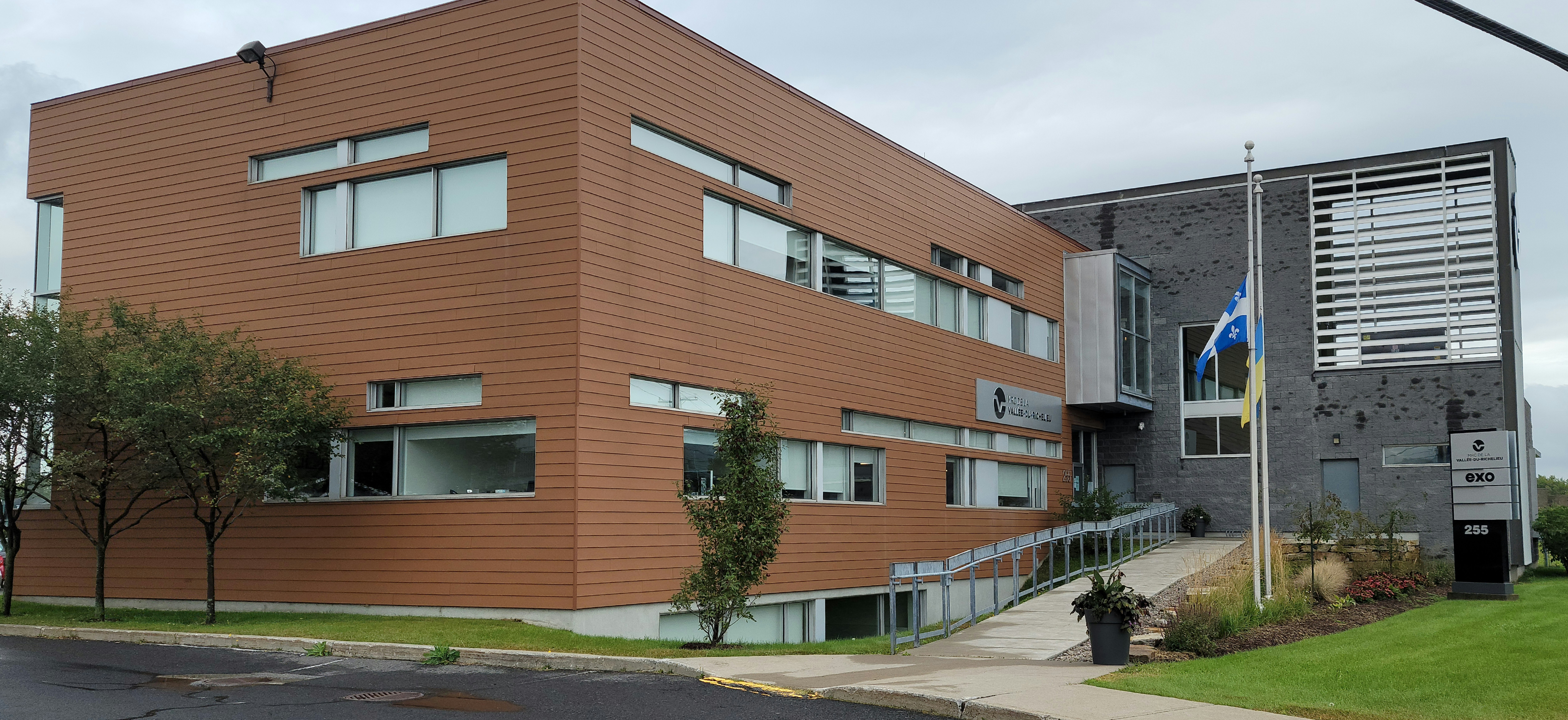

- Location in province of Quebec.
- Coordinates: 45°34′N 73°12′W
- Country: Canada
- Province: Quebec
- Region: Montérégie
- Effective: January 1, 1982
- County seat: McMasterville

Government
  - Type: Prefecture
  - Prefect: Gilles Plante

Area
  - Total: 605.50 km^{2} (233.78 sq mi)
  - Land: 588.60 km^{2} (227.26 sq mi)

Population (2016)
  - Total: 124,420
  - Density: 211.4/km^{2} (548/sq mi)
  - Change 2011-2016: ▲6.5%
  - Dwellings: 49,971
- Time zone: UTC−5 (EST)
  - Summer (DST): UTC−4 (EDT)
- Area codes: 450 and 579
- Website: www.mrcvr.ca

La Vallée-du-Richelieu (French pronunciation: [la vale dy ʁiʃ(ə)ljø], The Valley of the Richelieu) is a regional county municipality in the Montérégie region in southwestern Quebec, Canada. Its seat is McMasterville.

It surrounds the Richelieu River as the river flows north from Lake Champlain in the United States to the Saint Lawrence River northeast of Montreal at Sorel-Tracy, Quebec. Dramatically different from the mountainous terrain to the south, the river valley is a vast plain that has been developed with extensive farmlands.

In the 21st century, the Richelieu River is very popular for both U.S. and Canadian recreational boaters, providing a connection that can bring boaters all the way from the outlet of the Saint Lawrence River to New York Harbor. A number of old fortifications exist dating back to the 17th century; they were built by the French in an effort to try to prevent the Iroquois from using the river as a way to attack the French settlers in the area. Fort Richelieu is at the mouth of the Richelieu River. Fort St. Louis (now Fort Chambly) at Chambly, Fort Sainte-Thérèse, and Fort Saint-Jean at Saint-Jean-sur-Richelieu, are on the way. Fort St. Anne Isle La Motte, Vermont in Lake Champlain is near the river's source. The region is informally known as la Vallée-des-Forts.

== Subdivisions ==
There are 13 subdivisions within the RCM:

Cities & Towns (7)

- Beloeil
- Carignan
- Chambly
- McMasterville
- Mont-Saint-Hilaire
- Otterburn Park
- Saint-Basile-le-Grand

Municipalities (6)

- Saint-Antoine-sur-Richelieu
- Saint-Charles-sur-Richelieu
- Saint-Denis-sur-Richelieu
- Saint-Jean-Baptiste
- Saint-Marc-sur-Richelieu
- Saint-Mathieu-de-Beloeil

=== Former municipalities ===
- Saint-Bruno-de-Montarville (now part of the Urban agglomeration of Longueuil)

== Demographics ==
=== Population ===
Canada census – La Vallée-du-Richelieu community profile

	2021	2016	2011
Population	131,803 (+5.9% from 2016)	124,420 (+6.5% from 2011)	116,773 (+9.4% from 2006)
Land area	587.84 km^{2} (226.97 sq mi)	588.60 km^{2} (227.26 sq mi)	588.88 km^{2} (227.37 sq mi)
Population density	224.2/km^{2} (581/sq mi)	211.4/km^{2} (548/sq mi)	198.3/km^{2} (514/sq mi)
Median age	42.0 (M: 41.6, F: 42.4)	40.7 (M: 40.1, F: 41.2)	39.5 (M: 38.9, F: 40.0)
Private dwellings	53,796 (total) 52,785 (occupied)	49,971 (total)	46,215 (total)
Median household income	$100,000	$84,889	$74,521

References: 2021 2016 2011

Historical Census Data - La Vallée-du-Richelieu Regional County Municipality, Quebec

Year	Pop.	±%
1991	104,965	—
1996	113,832	+8.4%
ADJ	116,745	+2.6%

Year	Pop.	±%
2001	119,993	+2.8%
2006	106,762	−11.0%
2011	116,773	+9.4%

Year	Pop.	±%
2016	124,420	+6.5%

=== Language ===
Canada Census Mother Tongue - La Vallée-du-Richelieu Regional County Municipality, Quebec
Census	Total	French			English			French & English			Other		
Year	Responses	Count	Trend	Pop %	Count	Trend	Pop %	Count	Trend	Pop %	Count	Trend	Pop %
2021	131,803	117,755	▲2.84%	89.34%	6,010	▲50.6%	4.56%	1,965	▲19.5%	1.49%	6,010	▲50.8%	4.56%
2016	123,485	114,405	▲5.7%	92.6%	3,990	▼1.7%	3.2%	1105	▲77.82%	0.80%	3985	▲61.0%	2.14%
2011	115,690	108,230	▲9.5%	93.55%	4,060	▲0.6%	3.51%	925	▲55.5%	0.80%	2,475	▲4.4%	2.14%
2006	105,870	98,870	▼8.6%	93.39%	4,035	▼41.9%	3.81%	595	▼43.3%	0.56%	2,370	▼2.1%	2.24%
2001	118,635	108,215	▲5.8%	91.22%	6,950	▼2.7%	5.86%	1,050	▲8.8%	0.88%	2,420	▼3.2%	2.04%
1996	112,920	102,310	n/a	90.60%	7,145	n/a	6.33%	965	n/a	0.85%	2,500	n/a	2.21%

== Transportation ==
=== Access Routes ===
Highways and numbered routes that run through the municipality, including external routes that start or finish at the county border:

- Autoroutes
  - A-10
  - A-20 (TCH)
  - A-30
  - A-35
- Principal Highways
  - R-112
  - R-116
  - R-133
  - R-137
- Secondary Highways
  - R-223
  - R-227
  - R-229
- External Routes
  - None

== See also ==
- List of regional county municipalities and equivalent territories in Quebec
