= List of National Historic Sites of Canada in Quebec =

This is a list of National Historic Sites (French: Lieux historiques nationaux) in the province of Quebec. As of July 2019, there were 198 National Historic Sites designated in Quebec, 30 of which are administered by Parks Canada.

Sites in the province's two largest cities are listed separately at List of National Historic Sites in Montreal and List of National Historic Sites in Quebec City.

Numerous National Historic Events also occurred in Quebec, and are identified at places associated with them, using the same style of federal plaque which marks National Historic Sites. Several National Historic Persons are commemorated throughout the province in the same way. The markers do not indicate which designation—a Site, Event, or Person—a subject has been given.

This list uses names designated by the national Historic Sites and Monuments Board, which may differ from other names for these sites.

== National Historic Sites ==
| Site | Date(s) | Designated | Location | Description | Image |
|---|---|---|---|---|---|
| Acton Vale Railway Station (Grand Trunk) | 1900 (completed) | 1976 | Acton Vale; 45°38′53.85″N 72°33′50.45″W | A small passenger terminal with dormer, turret and bellcast roof; symbolic of the expansion of the Grand Trunk Railway | Exterior view of the Acton Gale Railway Station |
| Alert Hangar | 1958 (completed) | 2007 | La Baie; 48°20′4.77″N 70°58′19.75″W | Four large steel hangars at CFB Bagotville which, during the Cold War, housed fighter aircraft intended to counter surprise attacks by Soviet bombers; played a strategic role in the air defence of Canada | Aerial of CFB Bagotville |
| Apitipik | 6000 BCE (c.) | 1996 | Gallichan; 48°39′58.5″N 79°20′4.23″W | Traditional summering area and sacred place for the Abitibiwinni, and the site of trading posts from 1686 to 1922 | |
| Arvida Historic District | 1925 (established) | 2012 | Arvida; 48°26′0″N 71°11′0″W | A well-preserved example of a Canadian company town illustrating 25 years' worth of urban planning concepts, including the City Beautiful and Garden city movements; symbolic of the growth and development of the country’s aluminum industry | L'église Sainte-Thérèse-de-l'Enfant-Jésus in Arvida |
| Banc de Pêche de Paspébiac | 1783 (established) | 2001 | Paspébiac; 48°1′16.3″N 65°15′15.3″W | Ten buildings located on a large spit; associated with the commercial cod fishery in the Gulf of Saint Lawrence | View of the sandbar from a distance |
| Battle of Eccles Hill | 1870 (battle) | 1923 | Frelighsburg; 45°1′10″N 72°54′17″W | A site commemorating the battle where Canadian volunteers and home guards repulsed the Fenian invaders | Battle of Eccles Hill monument |
| Battle of Lacolle | 1814 (battle) | 1923 | Notre-Dame-du-Mont-Carmel; 45°4′9″N 73°20′31″W | A small garrison of British and Canadian defenders repulsed an American attack, ending the last American invasion of Lower Canada during the War of 1812 | Blockhouse used by the defenders in the Battle of Lacolle |
| Battle of September 6th, 1775 | 1775 (battle) | 1928 | Saint-Jean-sur-Richelieu; 45°16′52″N 73°14′57″W | Invading American troops preparing to attack Fort Saint-Jean were ambushed by a party of Mohawks and other allied Aboriginal people, forcing the Americans to retreat to Île aux Noix | |
| Battle of the Cedars | 1776 (battle) | 1928 | Les Cèdres; 45°18′35.75″N 74°2′7.21″W | The American army occupying Montreal established a post here to protect its western flank; a small detachment of the 8th Regiment of Foot, reinforced by allied Aboriginals, laid siege to the outpost and the Americans capitulated | Map showing military movements. British movements are in red; American movements are in blue |
| Battle of the Chateauguay | 1813 (battle) | 1920 | Ormstown; 45°9′30″N 73°55′52″W | A force consisting of about 1,630 French Canadian regulars and militia and Mohawk warriors under Charles de Salaberry repulsed an American force of about 4,000 attempting to invade Lower Canada during the War of 1812 | 1896 painting of the Battle of the Chateauguay |
| Battle of the Restigouche | 1760 (battle) | 1924 | Pointe-à-la-Croix; 48°1′0″N 66°44′5″W | A naval battle fought during the Seven Years' War on the Restigouche River between the British and the French; the last naval battle of the war in North American waters, and the French loss hastened the fall of New France | Scale model of Machault ship |
| Battle of Trois-Rivières | 1776 (battle) | 1920 | Trois-Rivières; 46°20′38″N 72°33′7″W | British victory over the Continental Army; the last major battle of the American invasion fought on Quebec soil | Monument at the Battle of Trois-Rivières |
| Beauharnois Power Development | 1930 (first phase) | 1990 | Beauharnois; 45°18′51″N 73°54′37″W | A hydroelectric power plant on the Saint Lawrence River that was of significant economic and technological importance at the time of its development | 1941 photo of the hydroelectric dam at Beauharnois Power Development |
| Berthier Railway Station (Canadian Pacific) | 1877 (completed) | 1976 | Sainte-Geneviève-de-Berthier; 46°5′18″N 73°12′45″W | One of the small domestic stations originally built along the railway line between Montreal and Quebec City; representative of the expansion of the Canadian Pacific Railway. DEMOLISHED | |
| Blanc-Sablon | 7000 BCE (c.) (first inhabited) | 2007 | Blanc-Sablon; 51°25′32″N 57°8′38″W | Over 60 archaeological sites relating to 9000 years of human occupation, including the Archaic, Dorset and European periods | Blanc-Sablon and the Davis Strait |
| Bolton-Est Town Hall | 1867 (completed) | 1984 | East Bolton; 45°12′11″N 72°21′23″W | A two-storey clapboard township hall; an enduring tribute to the development of local self-government in Canada | |
| Cap-des-Rosiers Lighthouse | 1858 (completed) | 1973 | Gaspé; 48°51′22″N 64°12′5″W | A 37-metre (121 ft) high stone lighthouse; the tallest lighthouse in Canada | Cap-des-Rosiers Lighthouse and accessory buildings |
| Carillon Barracks | 1838 (completed) | 1960 | Saint-André-d'Argenteuil; 45°33′53.81″N 74°22′18.28″W | A two-storey stone barracks on the main street of the village of Carillon, and now used as the local museum; used to British troops called in to suppress the Lower Canada Rebellion | Carillon Barracks |
| Carillon Canal | 1833 (completed) | 1929 | Saint-André-d'Argenteuil; 45°34′3.87″N 74°22′43.42″W | A canal now used for recreational purposes; an important navigable transportation route during the 19th and 20th centuries, joining Montreal to Kingston by the Saint Lawrence River | Carillon Canal and nearby trees and power lines |
| Caughnawaga Mission / Mission of St. Francis Xavier | 1647 (established), 1716 (established at Kahnawake) | 1966 | Kahnawake; 45°24′56″N 73°40′36″W | A Jesuit mission to the Mohawks, located within the walls of Fort St-Louis NHSC | Caughnawaga Mission, Presbytery and Church |
| Caughnawaga Presbytery | 1719 (completed) | 1969 | Kahnawake; 45°24′56″N 73°40′36″W | The oldest surviving building at the Caughnawaga Mission NHSC; the presbytery exemplifies the steep-pitch hip-roofed architecture common to Quebec in the late 17th and early 18th centuries | Left : Caughnawaga Presbytery |
| Chambly Canal | 1843 (completed) | 1929 | Chambly; 45°22′38″N 73°15′27″W | A 22-kilometre (14 mi) long canal that forms part of a waterway constructed in the 19th century on the Richelieu River, on the inland water transportation route joining Montreal and New York City | Chambly Canal in winter |
| Chapais House | 1834 (completed) | 1962 | Saint-Denis-De La Bouteillerie; 47°30′11.88″N 69°56′15.18″W | A 2 1/2-storey clapboard house that was the home of Jean Charles Chapais, a Father of Confederation | Chapais House with a church in the background |
| Church of Notre-Dame-de-la-Présentationl | 1924 (completed) | 2004 | Shawinigan; 46°31′39″N 72°45′1″W | Large stone Romanesque Revival church, with interior murals by Ozias Leduc; the paintings represent the culmination of Leduc's work and the end of the great era of religious mural painting in Quebec | Murals by Ozias Leduc in the interior of the Church of Notre-Dame-de-la-Présentation |
| Church of Sainte-Marie | 1859 (completed) | 2006 | Sainte-Marie; 46°26′15.15″N 71°1′20.47″W | A romantic Gothic Revival style church; known for its unique interiors designed by Charles Baillairgé and its trompe-l'œil and grisaille paintings by artist François-Édouard Meloche | Church of Sainte-Marie in winter |
| Corossol | 1693 (shipwreck) | 1995 | Sept-Îles; 50°5′37″N 66°23′29″W | The underwater remains of a ship belonging to Louis XIV which sank in a storm in 1693; the only remains in Canada from the wreck of a 17th-century French vessel | |
| Coteau-du-Lac | 1781 (completed) | 1923 | Coteau-du-Lac; 45°17′16″N 74°10′39″W | The remains of a canal and associated military fortifications; one of the oldest lock canals in North America, and the site of a British military post built following the American Revolutionary War and that served a strategic role during the War of 1812 | The block house at the Coteau-du-Lac canal site |
| Davie Shipyard | 1829 (established) | 1990 | Lévis; 46°48′51″N 71°11′5″W | A shipyard on the Saint Lawrence River which contains heritage resources dating to the wooden sailing ship era; when it closed in 1998, it was the oldest operational shipyard in Canada | The Davie Shipyard seen from a distance over the water |
| de Salaberry House | 1815 (completed) | 1968 | Chambly; 45°26′55″N 73°16′9″W | The large, three-storey stone house of Charles de Salaberry, located in front of the Chambly Rapids; representative of the style of country homes common in the Montreal region in the early 19th century | de Salaberry House |
| Droulers-Tsiionhiakwatha | 15th century (established) | 2007 | Saint-Anicet; 45.082964°N 74.314740°W | Discovered in 1994, an archaeological site containing the remains of mid-15th-century village of a group now identified as the St. Lawrence Iroquoians; the largest paleohistorical site discovered to date in Quebec | Reconstructions of buildings in Droulers-Tsiionhiakwatha |
| Étienne-Paschal Taché House | 1830 (completed) | 1990 | Montmagny; 46°58′52″N 70°33′30″W | The home of Sir Étienne-Paschal Taché, a Father of Confederation; distinctive house with twin towers | |
| First Geodetic Survey Station | 1905 (completed) | 1929 | Chelsea; 45°29′21″N 75°51′45″W | Located in Gatineau Park, the site of the first geodetic station established in Canada | |
| Forges du Saint-Maurice | 1730 (established) | 1919 | Trois-Rivières; 46°23′50″N 72°39′35″W | An industrial cultural landscape where an ironworks operated for more than 150 years; the principal industrial site under the French Regime, the establishment of which marked the beginnings of Canada's iron industry | Ruins of a chimney at the Forges du Saint-Maurice |
| Former Lamaque Mine and the Bourlamaque Mining Village | 1925 (established) | 2012 | Val-d’Or; 48°5′38″N 77°45′54″W | A 22 hectares (54 acres) site comprising a former gold mine and a nearby planned mining town; a well-preserved mining landscape and company town | A view of a road and remaining buildings in Bourlamaque |
| Former Shawinigan Aluminum Smelting Complex | 1899 (established) | 2002 | Shawinigan; 46°32′21″N 72°45′51″W | An early aluminum smelter with hydroelectric facilities that supplied it with power; the oldest known, extant aluminum smelting complex in North America | Some of the remaining brick buildings at the Former Shawinigan Aluminum Smelting Complex |
| Fort Chambly | 1665 (established) | 1920 | Chambly; 45°26′57″N 73°16′40″W | A stone fortress on the Richelieu River; served both the French and British regimes during the Iroquoian Wars, the Seven Years' War, the American Revolutionary War, the War of 1812 and the Rebellions of 1837 | Entrance to Fort Chambly |
| Fort Crevier | 1687 (established) | 1920 | Pierreville; 46°6′12″N 72°52′43″W | A fort built to defend the French inhabitants in the region against Iroquois attacks encouraged by the British | Fort Crevier Monument |
| Fort Laprairie | 1689 (established) | 1921 | La Prairie; 45°25′15″N 73°29′47″W | A site the Saint Lawrence River where a French fort once stood, where it served as a refuge for French settlers and a defensive outpost for Montreal | |
| Fort Lennox | 1759 (established) | 1920 | Saint-Paul-de-l'Île-aux-Noix; 45°7′15″N 73°16′5″W | A fort on Île aux Noix in the Richelieu River, one of the gateways into Canada; used by French, British and American forces during various conflicts | Entrance to Fort Lennox |
| Fort Longueuil | 1690 (completed) | 1923 | Longueuil; 45°32′26″N 73°30′30″W | The archaeological site of a fort demolished in 1810, extending beneath present-day Saint-Antoine-de-Padoue Cathedral; constructed between 1685 and 1690 as the fortified residence of Charles le Moyne de Longueuil, the only Canadian-born person to be raised to the rank of Baron by the French King | A drawing of the ruins of Fort Longueuil in 1825 |
| Fort Richelieu | 1642 (established) | 1923 | Sorel-Tracy; 46°2′48″N 73°6′57″W | One of the earliest forts in New France, intended to block Iroquois raids using the Richelieu River as a route into Canada | 1695 plan of Fort Richelieu |
| Fort Saint-Jean | 1748 (established) | 1923 | Saint-Jean-sur-Richelieu; 45°17′53″N 73°15′7″W | A fort built by Gaspard-Joseph Chaussegros de Léry that withstood a 45-days siege by Richard Montgomery during the American invasion of 1775; now houses the Royal Military College Saint-Jean | 1748 plan of Fort Saint-Jean |
| Fort St-Louis | 1725 (established) | 1930 | Kahnawake; 45°24′57″N 73°40′35″W | A fort built in 1725 by the French for the protection of a Jesuit mission | Map of Fort St-Louis |
| Fort Ste. Thérèse | 1665 (established) | 1923 | Chambly; 45°23′20.8″N 73°15′27.05″W | One of the forts constructed on the Richelieu River by the Carignan Regiment for defence against the Iroquois; site located within the Chambly Canal NHSC area | Map of Fort Sainte Thérèse and other forts on the Richelieu River circa 1665 for the campagne of the Regiment of Carignan-Salières |
| Fort Trois-Rivières | 1634 (established) | 1920 | Trois-Rivières; 46°20′31″N 72°32′19″W | The construction of a wooden fort on this site marked the second permanent settlement in New France and the foundation of the modern city of Trois-Rivières | Boulder marking the location of Fort Trois-Rivières |
| Governors' Cottage | 1781 (completed) | 1957 | Sorel-Tracy; 46°1′58″N 73°6′59″W | A house constructed for Frederick Haldimand as part of a defensive effort to settle the area with Loyalists; used as a summer residence by subsequent Governors and by military commanders until 1860 | Front exterior of the Governors' Cottage |
| Granada Theatre | 1929 (completed) | 1996 | Sherbrooke; 45°24′8″N 71°53′28″W | Theatre with Spanish Revival style facade; excellent example of an atmospheric theatre in Canada | Front facade and marquee of the Granada Theatre |
| Grosse Île and the Irish Memorial | 1832 (station established) | 1974 | Saint-Antoine-de-l'Isle-aux-Grues; 47°2′0″N 70°40′0″W | A quarantine station for immigrants arriving at Quebec City from 1832 to 1937; symbolic of the importance of immigration to Canada, and of the tragic experiences of Irish immigrants during the typhus epidemic of 1847 | Memorial erected in 1909 in commemoration of the death of Irish immigrants of 1849. Grosse-Île, Québec, Canada. |
| Haskell Free Library and Opera House | 1904 (completed) | 1985 | Stanstead; 45°0′20.34″N 72°5′51.84″W | A two-storey, Queen Anne Revival style building with tower that houses both a library and an opera house; the building straddles the Canadian–American border and was donated to the residents of both countries | Turrett on the Haskell Free Library and Opera House |
| Havelock Township Hall | 1868 (completed) | 1984 | Havelock; 45°2′45″N 73°45′28″W | A stone township hall; an exceptional example of the rural town halls built in 19th-century Canada | |
| The Historic Village of Val-Jalbert, Chambord, Quebec | 1901 (founded) | July 31, 2019 | Chambord; 48.444639°N 72.164361°W | A pulp mill company town, now a ghost town/park | |
| Île aux Basques | 1580 (ca.) (outpost established) | 1984 | Trois-Pistoles; 48°8′34″N 69°14′58″W | A small island that served as an outpost from about 1580 to 1630 for Basque fishermen who crossed the ocean from France; the only recorded site in the Gulf of Saint Lawrence where archaeological resources confirm early commercial contact between Europeans and Aboriginals | Photograph of a furnace used to melt whale blubber left by the Basques on Île aux Basques |
| Île d'Orléans Seigneury | 1636 (seigneury established) | 1990 | L'Île-d'Orléans Regional County Municipality; 46°55′0″N 70°58′0″W | One of the earliest settled areas of New France; the landscape and surviving 17th- and 18th-century buildings are evocative of the seigneurial system of New France | Landscape on Île d'Orléans |
| Île-Verte Lighthouse | 1809 (completed) | 1974 | Notre-Dame-des-Sept-Douleurs; 48°3′4″N 69°25′27″W | A 12-metre (39 ft) high cylindrical stone lighthouse; the first lighthouse on the Saint Lawrence River, and third oldest lighthouse in Canada | Île-Verte Lighthouse silhouetted against the sky |
| Jardins de Métis | 1926 (established) | 1995 | Grand-Métis; 48°37′42″N 68°7′23″W | An English-inspired garden created by Elsie Reford during the years 1926 to 1958; an excellent Canadian example of this type of garden | The villa at the Jardins de Métis |
| Joffre Roundhouse (Canadian National) | 1880 (completed) | 1992 | Charny; 46°42′25″N 71°16′20″W | Only existing full-circle roundhouse in Canada | |
| Joliette Court House | 1862 (completed) | 1981 | Joliette; 46°1′34″N 73°26′33″W | A noted and well-preserved example of a Neoclassical public building | Joliette Court House |
| Joly de Lotbinière Estate | 1851 (established) | 2003 | Sainte-Croix; 46°40′2″N 71°50′55″W | A remarkable 136-hectare (340-acre) manorial summer estate on the Pointe Platon peninsula, founded by Henri-Gustave Joly de Lotbinière | The manor house at Joly de Lotbinière Estate |
| L'Isle-Verte Court House | 1860 (completed) | 1981 | L'Isle-Verte; 48°0′45″N 69°20′20″W | A court house built in the Regency style, a style rarely used for public buildings in Canada; a rare example of a purpose-built circuit court building | L'Isle-Verte Court House |
| La Corne Nursing Station | 1930 (established) | 2003 | La Corne; 48°21′23″N 77°59′46″W | Two wooden buildings that are one of the best preserved of the 174 nursing stations created in Quebec between 1932 and 1975; symbolizes the contribution of nurses in isolated, rural communities | |
| La Malbaie Historic District | 1930 (established) | 2007 | La Malbaie; 47°37′23″N 70°8′30″W | One of the oldest villégiature, or vacation, areas in Canada, with impressive vistas overlooking the Saint Lawrence River | Manoir Richelieu in La Malbaie |
| La Petite-Ferme du cap Tourmente | 1626 (farm); 1667 (house) | 2018 | Saint-Joachim; 47.065676°N 70.794053°W | First farm in the St. Lawrence Valley, begun by Champlain in 1626, then used for 300 years by the Quebec Seminary. Now part of Cap Tourmente National Wildlife Area | La Petite-Ferme du cap Tourmente |
| Le Boutillier Manor | 1860 (completed) | 1975 | Gaspé; 48°55′56″N 64°18′6″W | The distinctive home of businessman and political figure John Le Boutillier | |
| Légaré Mill | 1763 (completed) | 1999 | Saint-Eustache; 45°33′29″N 73°53′45″W | A flour mill that has functioned continuously since the French colonial period; a proto-industrial building site that is representative of the development of the seigneurial system and the related colonial agricultural economy | Detail of the Légaré Mill |
| Lévis Forts | 1872 (completed) | 1920 | Lévis; 46°48′53″N 71°9′31″W | The remains of three 19th-century stone defensive works located on a height of land on the south bank of the Saint Lawrence River; constructed by the British, they were an integral part of the fortifications of Quebec City | An entrance into the Lévis Forts |
| Lévis Railway Station (Intercolonial) | 1884 (completed) | 1976 | Lévis; 46°48′37″N 71°11′14″W | A two-storey, stone railway station building that served as the terminus of the Intercolonial Railway from Halifax | |
| Louis Bertrand House | 1853 (completed) | 1999 | L'Isle-Verte; 48°0′49″N 69°20′16″W | A house built in the traditional "maison québecoise" manner for merchant and politician Louis Bertrand; an outstanding example of its style and type, and representative of the lifestyle middle-class families in Quebec society in the 19th century | Louis Bertrand House surrounded by trees |
| Louis S. St. Laurent | 1881 (lots assembled by St. Laurent family) | 1973 | Compton; 45°14′29″N 71°49′30″W | The site where Prime Minister Louis St. Laurent was born; a cultural landscape associated with the life of Canada's 12th Prime Minister and that also commemorates the social history of the Eastern Townships | |
| Magog Textile Mill | 1883 (completed) | 1989 | Magog; 45°15′45″N 72°8′28″W | The only 19th-century cotton mill in Canada where the entire process of spinning, weaving, bleaching and printing was carried on at one site, and the mill where cotton was printed in 1884 for the first time in Canada | The Magog Textile Mill |
| Manoir Papineau | 1850 (completed) | 1986 | Montebello; 45°38′45.96″N 74°56′44.85″W | A large mansion on a bluff overlooking the Ottawa River, located on the grounds of the Château Montebello hotel; commemorates the first owner of the house, Louis-Joseph Papineau | Facade of Manoir Papineau |
| Mauvide-Genest Manor | 1734 (completed) | 1993 | Saint-Jean-de-l'Île-d'Orléans; 46°54′51″N 70°54′9″W | An excellent example of a mid 18th-century, rural seigneurial manor | Mauvide-Genest Manor in 1930 |
| National Field of Honour | 1930 (established) | 2007 | Pointe-Claire / Beaconsfield; 45°26′31″N 73°51′10″W | Military cemetery established by the Last Post Fund for Canadian and Allied veterans; contains over 22,000 burials and serves as one of Canada's principal veterans' cemeteries and memorial sites. | Entrance to the National Field of Honour cemetery |
| Obadjiwan-Fort Témiscamingue | 1685 (established) | 1931 as Fort Témiscamingue NHS; Renamed July 5, 2019 | Duhamel-Ouest; 47°17′19″N 79°27′41″W | A fort built by the French to compete with the Hudson's Bay Company; later rebuilt and controlled by the North West Company after the Conquest of 1760 | Remnants of Fort Témiscamingue with Lake Timiskaming in the background |
| Old Chicoutimi Pulp Mill | 1896 (established) | 1983 | Chicoutimi; 48°25′14″N 71°5′0″W | An industrial complex in a wooded area, comprising five stone buildings constructed between 1898 and 1923; the major facility of the Chicoutimi Pulp Company, Canada's largest producer of mechanical wood pulp in the early 20th century | Old Chicoutimi Pulp Mill and river |
| Old Chicoutimi Trading Post | 1676 (established) | 1972 | Chicoutimi; 48°25′44″N 71°4′32″W | A fur trade post, built at the head of the Saguenay River, which became the principal trading post in the region and the major centre of the fur trade in the interior | |
| Pagé - Rinfret House / Beaudry House | 1720 (established) | 1969 | Cap-Santé; 46°40′19″N 71°47′0″W | A one-and-a-half-storey, wood-frame house overlooking the Saint Lawrence River, reflective of the architecture of New France and French Canadian building traditions | |
| Pointe-au-Père Lighthouse | 1859 (first lighthouse completed) | 1974 | Rimouski; 48°31′2.79″N 68°28′8.39″W | A lighthouse and associated buildings located on a headland facing the Saint Lawrence River; an important navigation light in the river and the Gulf of Saint Lawrence | Pointe-au-Père Lighthouse, accessory building and streetlight |
| Pointe-du-Buisson | 3000 BCE (ca.) (earliest archaeological resources) | 2005 | Beauharnois; 45°18′59.28″N 73°57′57.18″W | A 21-hectare (52-acre) archaeological site on a point of land along the Saint Lawrence River; documents the history of Aboriginal populations over the last 5000 years who used the river in their travels | |
| Powerscourt Covered Bridge | 1861 (completed) | 1984 | Elgin and Hinchinbrooke; 45°0′25.13″N 74°9′39.75″W | A wooden covered bridge that still stands on its original stone foundations; the only remaining McCallum inflexible arched truss bridge in the world and one of the oldest extant covered bridges in Canada | View of the Powerscourt Covered Bridge and the Chateauguay River |
| Rivière-du-Loup Town Hall | 1916 (completed) | 1984 | Rivière-du-Loup; 47°50′9″N 69°32′12″W | A two-storey red-brick city hall, the eclectic design of which set it apart from the surrounding commercial buildings at the time of its construction; symbolizes the town's aspirations and desire to increase its profile during the First World War | Rivière-du-Loup Town Hall |
| Roberval Town Hall | 1929 (completed) | 1984 | Roberval; 48°31′6″N 72°13′20″W | A three-storey town hall with steeply pitched, Second Empire-style metal roofs; symbolizes the prosperity of Roberval and its increasing importance within the Saguenay–Lac-Saint-Jean region at the time of the building's construction | Roberval Town Hall in summer |
| Round Stone Windmill and House | 1721 (windmill completed) | 1969 | Notre-Dame-de-l'Île-Perrot; 45°21′57″N 73°51′8″W | An extremely rare stone windmill and accessory miller’s house dating from the 18th-century seigneury, located on Île Perrot | The windmill with Lake Saint-Louis in the background |
| Saint-André-de-Kamouraska Church | 1811 (completed) | 1985 | Saint-André-de-Kamouraska; 47°40′25″N 69°43′44″W | A noted example of the small Quebec churches built according to the "Récollet Plan" (a broad nave with a narrower semicircular apse); the interiors contain some of the best surviving examples of the work of sculptor Louis-Xavier Leprohon | Saint-André-de-Kamouraska Church in winter |
| Saint-Eustache Church | 1783 (first completed); 1837 (battle) | 2015 | Saint-Eustache, Quebec; 45°33′26″N 73°53′20″W | A site and symbol of the Battle of Saint-Eustache in the Rebellions of 1837, marking the end of the Lower Canada Rebellion | |
| Saint-Hyacinthe Post Office | 1894 (completed) | 1983 | Saint-Hyacinthe; 45°37′25″N 72°56′55″W | A noted example of the work of federal architect Thomas Fuller | Saint-Hyacinthe Post Office |
| Saint-Jean-d'Iberville Railway Station (Grand Trunk) | 1890 (completed) | 1976 | Saint-Jean-sur-Richelieu; 45°18′11″N 73°15′15″W | A one-storey passenger railway station; representative of the expansion of the Grand Trunk Railway and of the company's presence in Quebec prior to its 1923 amalgamation with Canadian National Railways | In celebration of the 100th anniversary of the first train in Canada, a replica of an old steam engine used by The Champlain & St. Lawrence Railway was brought into the Saint-Jean-sur-Richelieu railway station in 1936 |
| Saint-Joachim Church | 1797 (completed) | 1999 | Châteauguay; 45°21′39″N 73°44′55″W | A noted example of the vernacular Baroque style in the St. Lawrence Valley, with interior decor by Philippe Liébert and Joseph Légaré | Side view of Saint-Joachim Church |
| Saint-Joseph-de-Beauce Institutional Ensemble | 1865–1911 (period of construction) | 2006 | Saint-Joseph-de-Beauce; 46°18′36″N 70°52′58″W | A complex of five main buildings consisting of a church, convent, presbytery, orphanage and school; one of the most striking institutional ensembles in Quebec, and illustrative of the Catholic institutions in small towns that served as gathering places for religious, educational and community services | The presbytery of the Saint-Joseph-de-Beauce Institutional Ensemble |
| Saint-Joseph-de-la-Rive Shipyard | 1946 (established) | 1996 | Les Éboulements; 47°27′21″N 70°21′45″W | A shipyard associated with small-scale coastal shipping along the Saint Lawrence River, and the largest builder of wooden schooners known as "goélettes" | Saint-Joseph-de-la-Rive Shipyard |
| Saint-Ours Canal | 1849 (completed), 1933 (current locks completed) | 1996 | Saint-Ours; 45°51′53″N 73°8′48″W | A canal on the east bank of the Richelieu River; along with the Chambly Canal, commemorates the importance in the 19th century of the inland water transportation route joining Montreal and New York City | Saint-Ours Canal |
| Saint-Vincent-de-Paul Penitentiary | 1873 (established) | 1990 | Laval; 45°37′1″N 73°38′47″W | Canada’s second federal penitentiary, and for a time the country’s sole francophone correctional facility; the now-closed facility is representative of over a century of criminal justice | Saint-Vincent-de-Paul Penitentiary in 1884 |
| Sainte-Anne Processional Chapel | 1830 (completed) | 1990 | Neuville; 46°41′56″N 71°34′57″W | A small early rubblestone chapel with a gable roof and belltower; the chapel and surrounding site have remained remarkably intact from the time of the chapel's construction in the early 19th century | Sainte-Anne Processional Chapel |
| The Sainte-Croix-de-Tadoussac Mission Church | 1750 (completed) | 2012 | Tadoussac; 48°8′30.09″N 69°42′55.12″W | A mission church from the era of New France and the oldest extant wooden church in Canada; bore witness to Jesuit missionary work in remote areas of New France and the conversion of the Innu to Christianity | The spire of The Sainte-Croix-de-Tadoussac Mission Church |
| Second Battle of Laprairie | 1691 (battle) | 1921 | La Prairie; 45°23′21″N 73°24′13″W | After Pieter Schuyler led a British force in a surprise attack on the French frontier settlement of La Prairie, Captain de Valrennes and a small band of French and Indian troops intercepted the British and inflicted a severe defeat, forcing the British to withdraw to New York | |
| Sir John A. Macdonald’s Summer Residence | 1880 (completed) | 2014 | Rivière-du-Loup; 47°48′46″N 69°34′32″W | | Front of Sir John A. Macdonald’s Summer Residence |
| Sir Wilfrid Laurier | 1870 (completed) | 1938 | Saint-Lin-Laurentides; 45°51′12″N 73°45′27″W | A small house on the site where Wilfrid Laurier was born in 1841, which was acquired by the federal government in 1937 under the mistaken impression it was actually the Laurier family house (the house was built 5 years after the Lauriers sold the lot); one of two houses in Quebec that are designated NHSCs in commemoration of Canada's 7th Prime Minister | A bedroom interior at the Sir Wilfrid Laurier National Historic Site |
| St. Stephen's Anglican Church | 1822 (completed) | 1970 | Chambly; 45°26′52″N 73°16′26″W | A small, stone church, originally constructed for the garrison at Fort Chambly; combines Quebec architectural traditions with Palladian influences, and is a noted example of early 19th century ecclesiastical architecture in Canada | Front facade of St. Stephen's Anglican Church |
| Symmes Hotel | 1831 (completed) | 1976 | Gatineau; 45°23′40″N 75°51′18″W | A stone inn overlooking the north shore of the Ottawa River, originally built for Charles Symmes, the founder of Aylmer; notable as a stopping place on a busy early transportation route which led to the trading posts of northwestern Quebec | Symmes Hotel and signage |
| Trestler House | 1806 (completed) | 1969 | Vaudreuil-Dorion; 45°23′17″N 74°0′25″W | A gable-roofed rubblestone house built for Jean-Joseph Trestler; a noted example of traditional Quebec architecture | Front of Trestler House |
| Trois-Rivières Historical Complex | 1700–1829 (construction period) | 1962 | Trois-Rivières; 46°20′38″N 72°32′12″W | A historic area comprising five buildings: De Gannes House, the Hertel de la Fresnière House, the Recollet Convent, the Recollet Church, and the Ursuline Convent; a unique group of buildings that represents 18th-century French Canada | View of buildings in the Trois-Rivières Historical Complex, including the Ursulines dome |
| Waapushukamikw | 5050 BCE (ca.) (establishment) | 2009 | Baie-James; 51°4′8″N 72°54′14″W | A white quartzite hill approximately 40 metres (130 ft) high that served as a major quarry site for Aboriginal peoples, and remains a place of spiritual significance for the Mistissini Cree | |
| Wilfrid Laurier House | 1877 (completed) | 1999 | Victoriaville; 46°2′14″N 71°54′54″W | A red-brick, Italianate-style house that served as Wilfrid Laurier's principal residence for 20 years, and his summer home until his death in 1919; now a museum commemorating Canada's 7th Prime Minister | Wilfrid Laurier House with a bust of Laurier in front |
| Wreck of RMS Empress of Ireland | 1914 (sinking) | 2009 | The riverbed of the Saint Lawrence River near Rimouski; 48°37′30″N 68°24′29.99″W | The wreck of the worst maritime disaster in Canadian history; the sole surviving ship from the Canadian Pacific Railway's heyday prior to the First World War as the world's largest and most extensive transportation and communications network | The RMS Empress of Ireland in 1908 |
| Wreck of the Elizabeth and Mary | 1690 (sinking) | 1996 | The seabed of Anse aux Bouleaux, near Baie-Trinité; 49°22′55″N 67°18′55″W | The remains of one of four vessels from the fleet of Admiral William Phips, lost during an ill-fated expedition from New England to attack New France | |

=== Former National Historic Site ===
| Name | Established | Disbanded | Result |
|---|---|---|---|
| Jacques Cartier Monument National Historic Site | 1977 | | Monument in Gaspé transferred from the national park system to Gaspesie Museum(?) |

== See also ==
- Cultural heritage of Quebec
- History of Quebec
- Répertoire du patrimoine culturel du Québec
- Former Shawinigan Aluminium Plant
