= Battle of Montreal =

Battle of Montreal may refer to:

- Battle of La Prairie (1690), successful English colonial expeditions against Montreal during King William's War
- Montreal Campaign (1760), a major British campaign which led to the fall of Montreal in the French and Indian War
- Siege of Fort St. Jean, Battle of Longue-Pointe, and Battle of The Cedars (1775–1776), actions near Montreal in the American Revolutionary War
- Battle of the Chateauguay (1813), an American offensive against Montreal defeated by French Canadian volunteers in the War of 1812
