= Fort Crevier =

- Pierreville, Nicolet-Yamaska, Quebec, New France, Canada
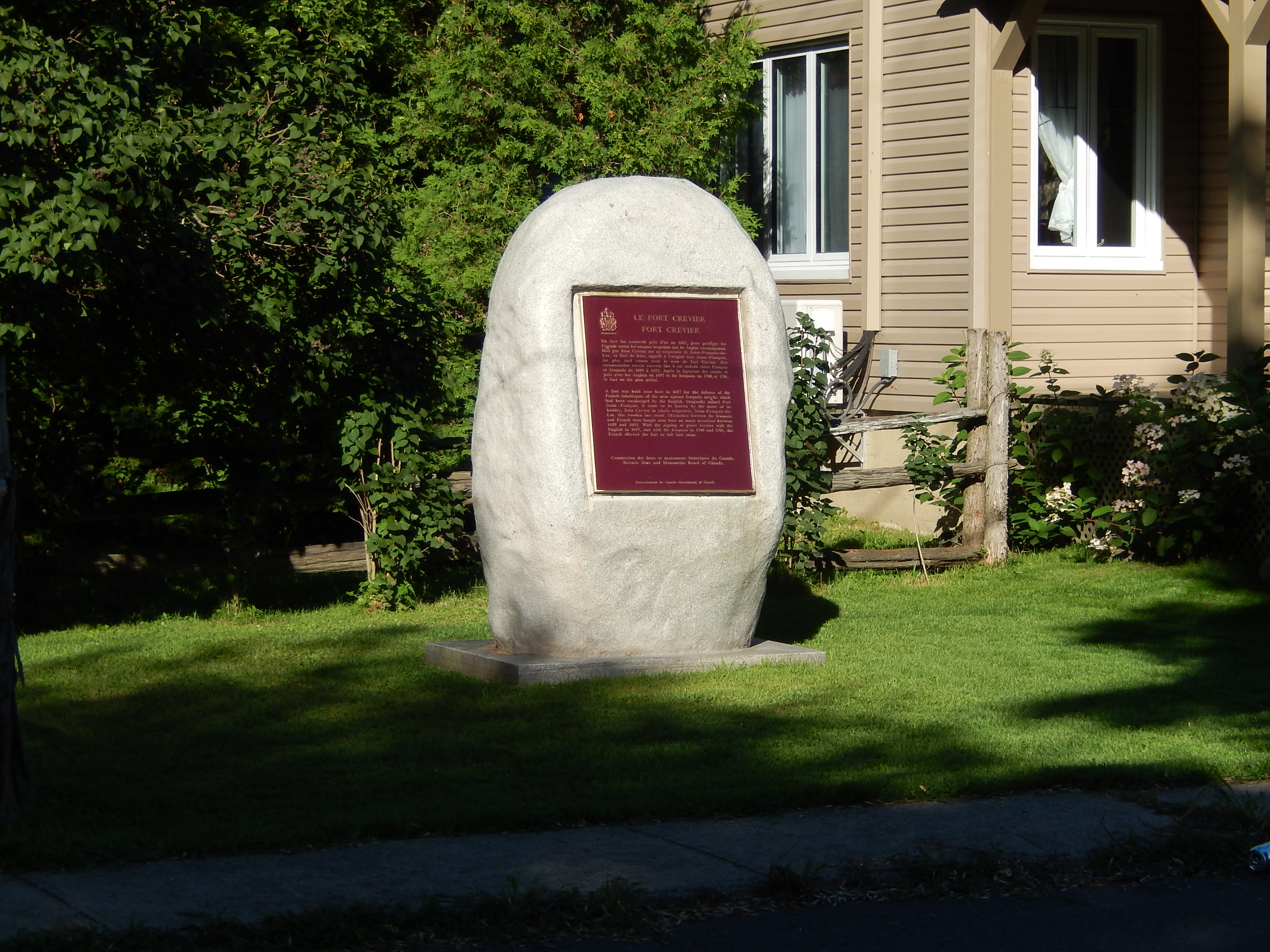

Site information
- Controlled by: France

Site history
- Built: 1687
- Battles/wars: French and Indian War

National Historic Site of Canada
- Official name: Fort Crevier National Historic Site of Canada
- Designated: 1920

Fort Crevier is a French fort built near the Saint-François River in Quebec.

In 1687, near Saint-François-du-Lac, the fort was built by Jean Crevier de Saint-François. It was also known as Fort Saint-François. The fort's purpose was to defend the French inhabitants in the region against Haudenosaunee attacks encouraged by the British. It was attacked by the Haudenosaunee in November 1689, and again in August 1693, when Crevier was killed. The fort became an integral part of the Abenaki village of Saint-François in 1700, and was abandoned following the end of hostilities with the Haudenosaunee in 1701. The village was destroyed on 4 October 1759 by Rogers' Rangers (under Major Robert Rogers). The population was decimated. The village became Odanak afterwards.

It was designated a National Historic Site of Canada in 1920. A monument commemorating the fort was put in place by the Historic Sites and Monuments Board of Canada and unveiled in June 1939.

== See also ==
- List of French forts in North America
- List of National Historic Sites of Canada in Quebec
