= Banc de Pêche de Paspébiac =

Coordinates: 48°1′16.3″N 65°15′15.3″W

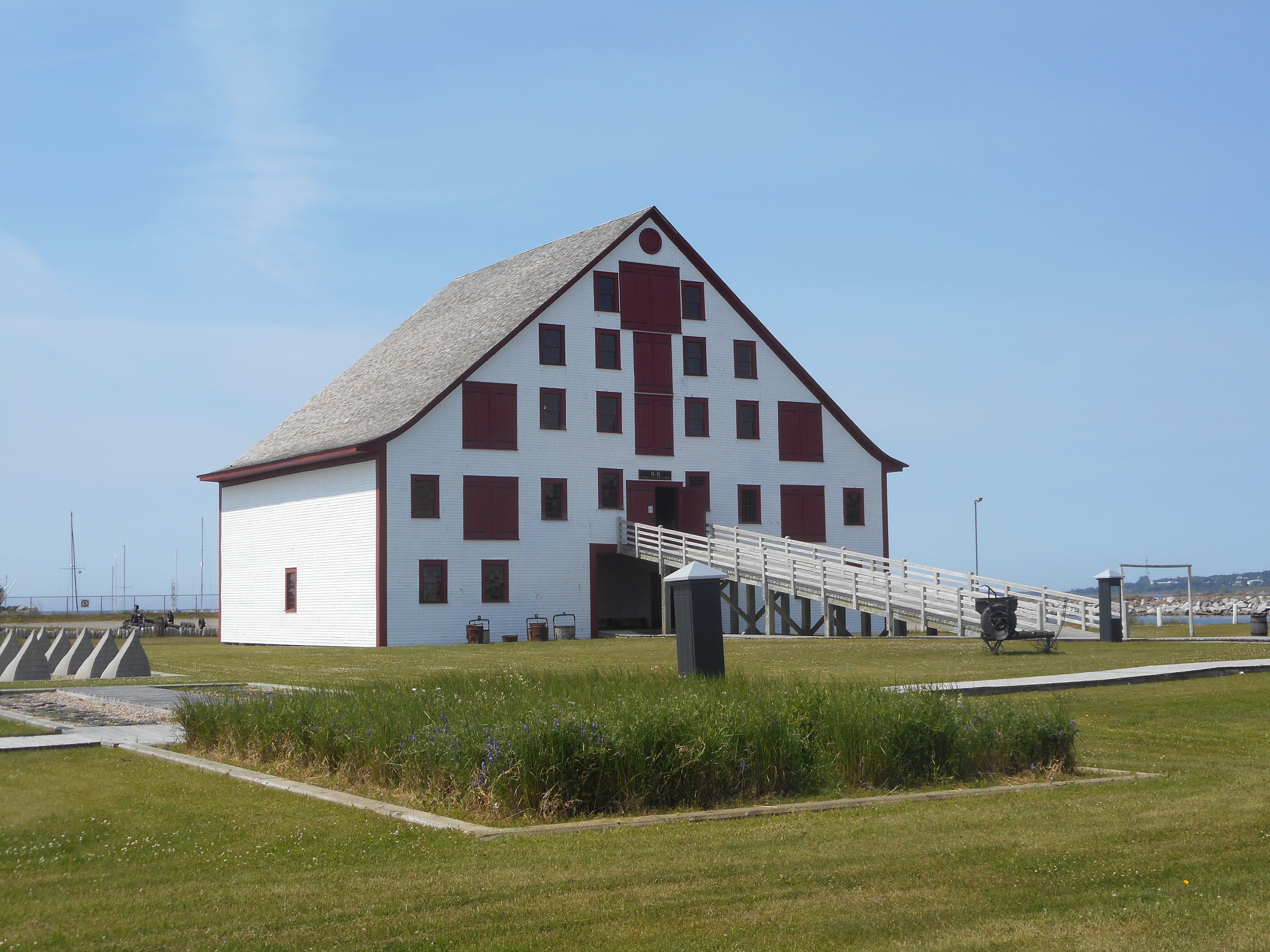
The Entrepôt Le Boutillier & Brothers, near the wharf.

The Banc de pêche de Paspébiac (French pronunciation: [bɑ̃ də pɛʃ də paspebjak], lit. 'Paspébiac fishing bank') is a complex of ten buildings in Paspébiac, Quebec, Canada. The buildings were built between 1783 and 1900 by fishing companies from Jersey.

The Paspébiac fishing bank is situated on Chaleur Bay, on a dune closing the Paspébiac lagoon in the Gaspé Peninsula.

The Entrepôt Lebouthillier (English: Lebouthillier Warehouse) is the largest building on site. The building is approximately 30 metres (98 ft) tall and is the main symbol of Paspébiac.

== Heritage designation ==
The fishing bank was classified as a Bien culturel du Québec on July 17, 1981 by the Ministry of Culture of Quebec.

On June 15, 2001, the fishing bank was designated as a National Historic Site of Canada, recognizing both its architecture and its social, economic and historical importance in the cod fisheries.
