= Rivière-du-Loup Town Hall =

Local government building in Quebec, Canada

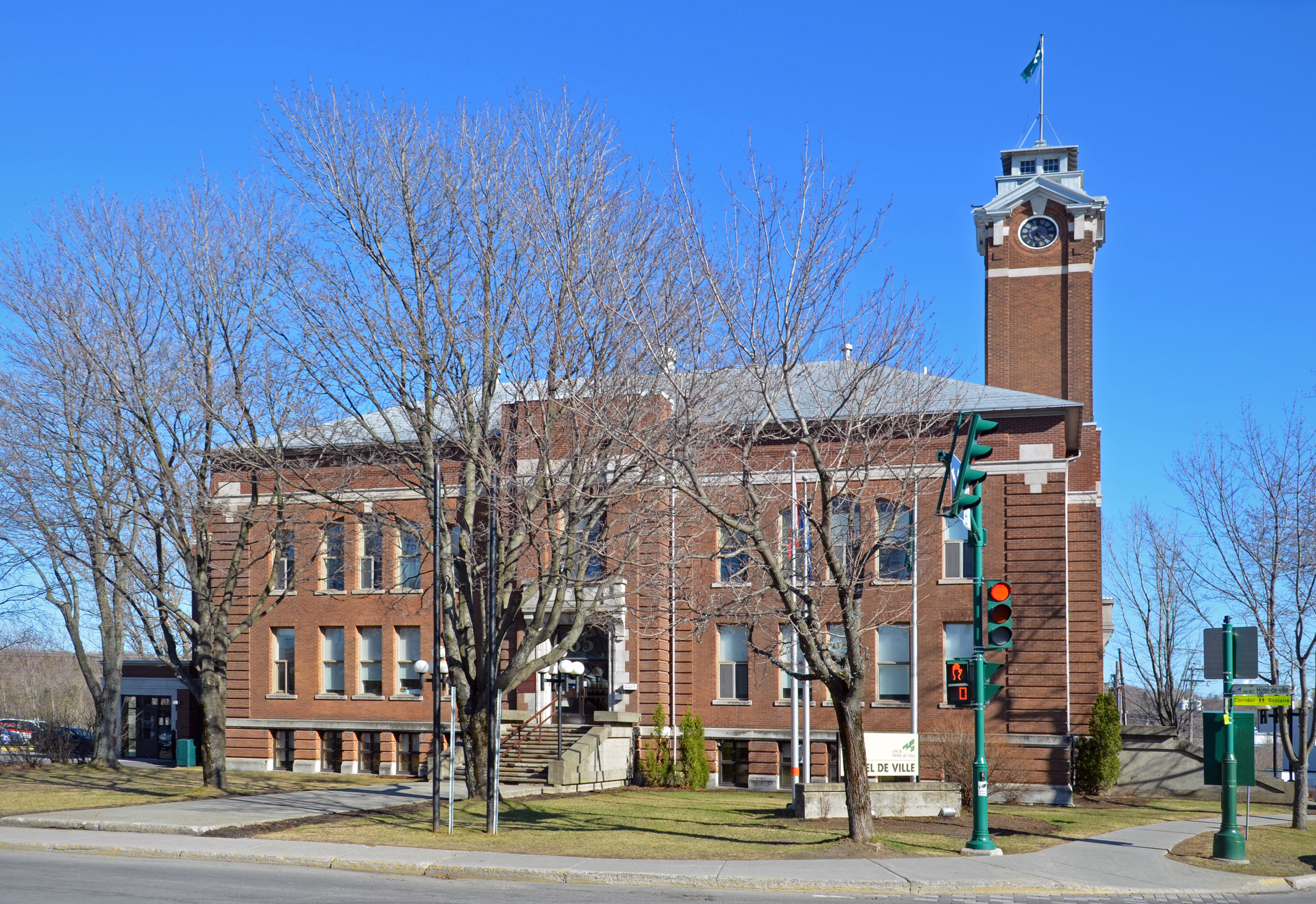
- Interactive map of the Rivière-du-Loup Town Hall area

General information
- Architectural style: Romanesque Revival
- Location: 189 Lafontaine Street, Rivière-du-Loup, Quebec, Canada
- Coordinates: 47°50′9″N 69°32′12″W
- Opened: 1916
- Renovated: 1972-73

Technical details
- Floor count: 2

Design and construction
- Architect: Georges Ouiment
- Main contractor: Lachance et Fils

National Historic Site of Canada
- Designated: 1984

Rivière-du-Loup Town Hall is the seat of local government in Rivière-du-Loup, Quebec, Canada. It is located at 189 Lafontaine Street.

It was designed by architect Georges Ouimet in incorporating references to the Arts and Crafts Movement and the Second Empire style. It was built by contractors Lachance et Fils and was completed in 1916. It was enlarged from 1972 to 1973.

It was designated as a National Historic Site of Canada on November 23, 1984.
