= Philippe Clément du Vuault de la Valrennes =

Philippe Clément du Vault de la Valrennes (born c. 1647 - died 12 October 1707) was a French military officer. He was captain of the Normandy Regiment and captain of the colonial troops in New France from 1685 to 1693.

== Biography ==
Philippe Clément du Vault de la Valrennes was born in the Province of Normandy, France in about 1647. He later enlisted in the French Royal Army and was transferred to New France. Valrennes subsequently participated in the 1691 Battle of La Prairie, when he defeated Major Pieter Schuyler and his militia and First Nation allies, during King William's War. He died on 12 October 1707.

== See also ==
- Normandy
- New France
