= Paspébiac =

- City
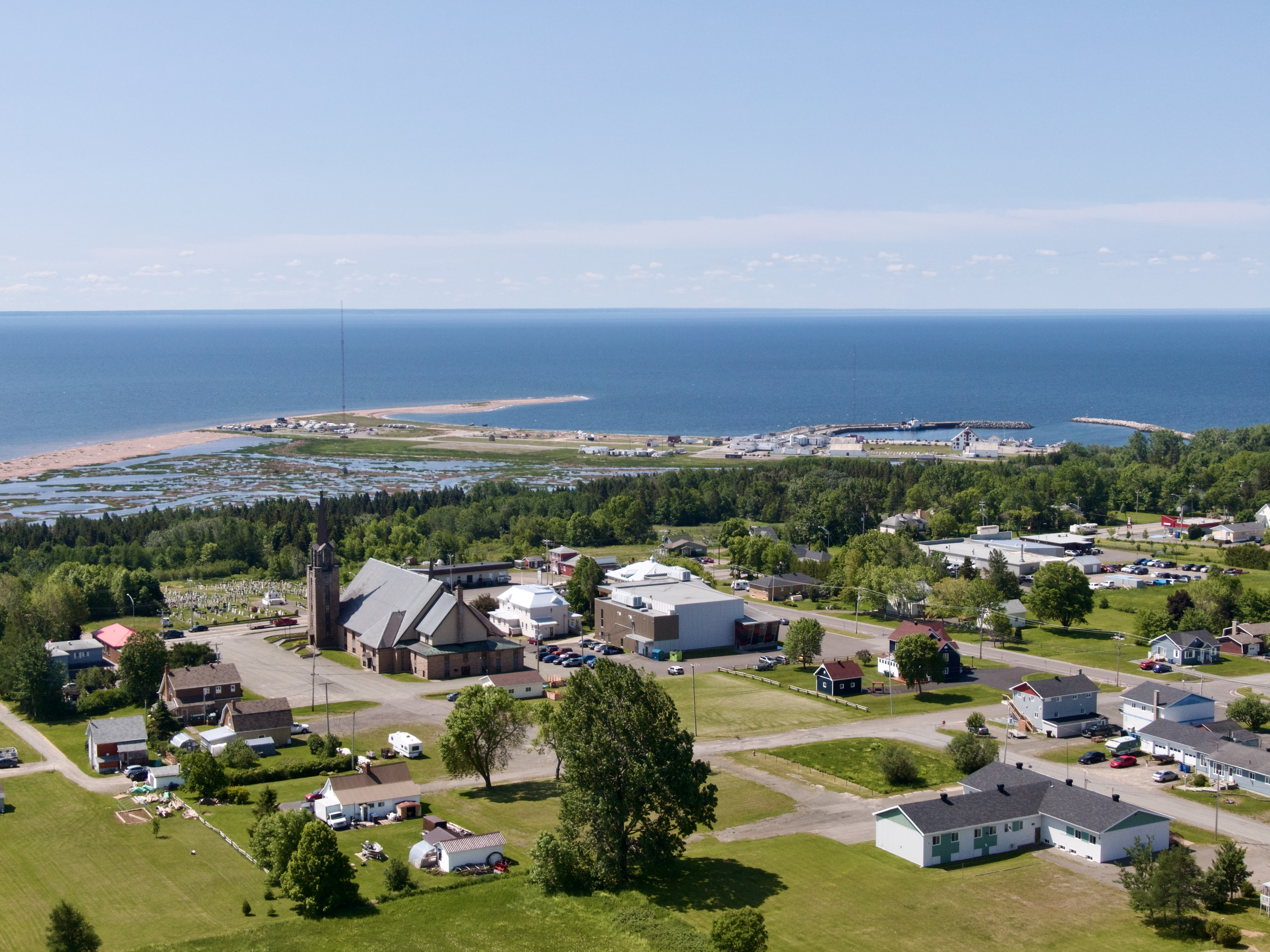
- Skyline of Paspébiac

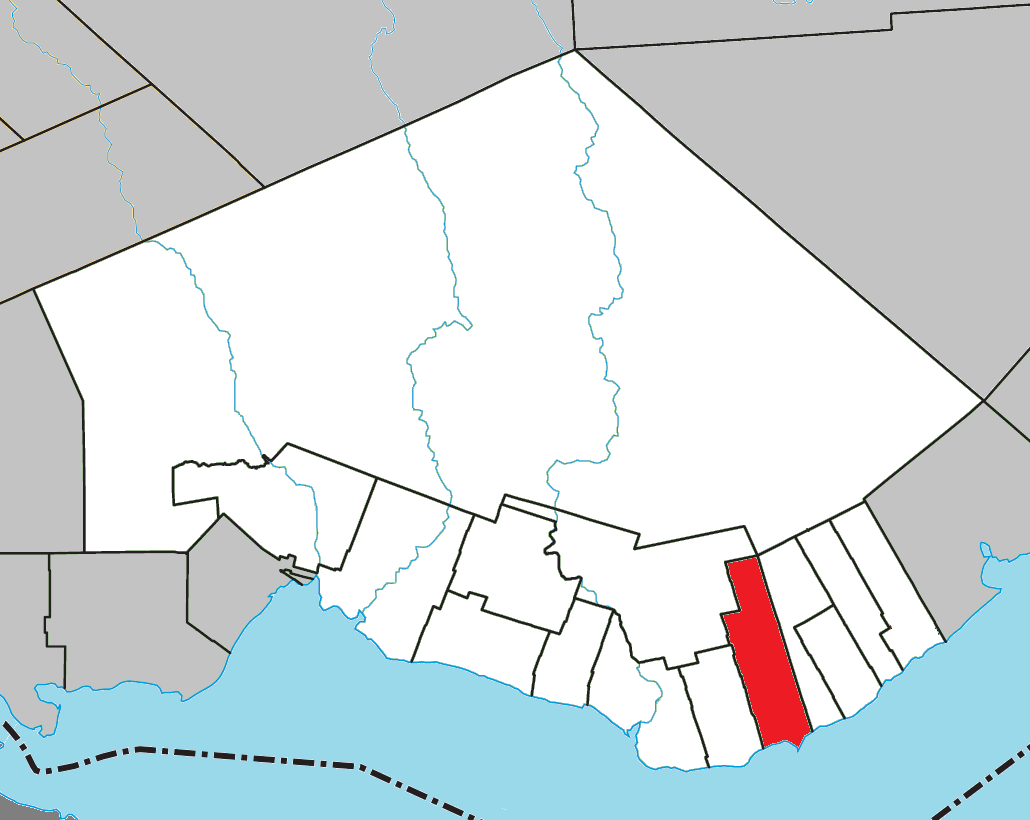
- Location within Bonaventure RCM

- Location in eastern Quebec
- Coordinates: 48°02′N 65°15′W
- Country: Canada
- Province: Quebec
- Region: Gaspésie– Îles-de-la-Madeleine
- RCM: Bonaventure
- Settled: 1755
- Constituted: August 20, 1997

Government
  - Mayor: Jérémy Laplante
  - Federal riding: Gaspésie—Les Îles-de-la-Madeleine—Listuguj
  - Prov. riding: Bonaventure

Area
  - Total: 96.05 km^{2} (37.09 sq mi)
  - Land: 94.98 km^{2} (36.67 sq mi)

Population (2021)
  - Total: 3,033
  - Density: 31.9/km^{2} (83/sq mi)
  - Pop (2016-21): ▼4.1%
  - Dwellings: 1,501
- Time zone: UTC−5 (EST)
  - Summer (DST): UTC−4 (EDT)
- Postal code(s): G0C 2K0
- Area codes: 418 and 581
- Highways: R-132
- Website: www.villepaspebiac.ca

Paspébiac (French pronunciation: [paspebjak]) is a city on Baie des Chaleurs in the Gaspésie region of eastern Quebec, Canada. The population was 3,033 as of the 2021 Canadian census. The town is noted for the Banc de Pêche de Paspébiac, a large sandbar jutting out into the bay which has been designated a National Historic Site of Canada.

Paspébiac was Quebec's first cod fishing port. The town also has Basque roots and an accent which is different from the rest of the region. Its name may come from the Mi'kmaq expression papgeg ipsigiag, meaning "split flats" or "lagoon". Other sources indicate that the Mi'kmaq named it for Wospegiak, which means "shining in the distance."

In addition to Paspébiac itself, the town's territory also includes the communities of Duret, Paspébiac-Ouest, and Rivière-Paspébiac.

== History ==
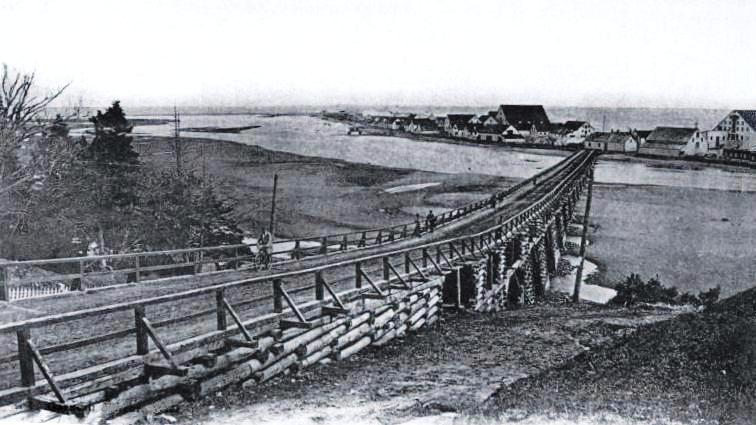
Lagoon bridge in Paspébiac, c. 1910

In 1707, the area was granted as a seignory to Pierre Haimard (1674–1724) and this marked the beginning of the colonization of Gaspésie's southern shores. But it only saw periodic visits during the fishing season until 1755 when settlers arrived from Acadia, Normandy, the Pays Basque, and, after the British conquest of Quebec, Jersey.

In 1767, the Jersey merchants Charles Robin and Company established there a permanent fishing operation and headquarters. This, together with its natural harbour, made Paspébiac the region's main commercial centre. The Robin and Le Boutillier installations on the barachois resembled a small town. Each company had a warehouse four or five storeys high, a general store, a wharf, a carpenter shop, a sail loft, a blacksmith shop and forge, a cooper shop for making barrels, offices, a cook-house, a boarding house for the apprentices, and numerous other buildings – besides the large area given over to the flakes and the drying fish. Set on the hill away from the fishery there were the Robin farm buildings and a large house, known as The Park, where the General Manager lived.

In 1796, the local parish was founded, and in 1832, its post office opened. In 1855, the place was incorporated as the Township Municipality of Cox, named after the geographic township that in turn was named in honour of Nicholas Cox (c. 1724–1794), lieutenant governor of the Gaspé District. As late as 1860, the ocean was the only available means of transportation, and there is record of an observer in 1858 writing about "le manque absolu de chemins" (lit. "the absolute lack of paths") in the region. In 1877, this township municipality ceased to exist when it was divided into the Municipalities of Paspébiac and New Carlisle.

In 1886, riots broke out in Paspebiac because of the bankruptcy of the firm of Charles Robin and Company, which had resulted from the failure of the banks of Jersey. In 1922, the western part of the municipality split off to form the Municipality of Paspébiac-Ouest. But on 6 August 1997, Paspébiac-Ouest was merged back into Paspébiac. In 1999, it changed its status to ville (town).

A triangular voyage evolved over time with the Robin company. Ships would leave Paspébiac laden with dry cod bound for ports in the West Indies and South America. There they would take on cargoes of rum, molasses and sugar for Europe. From Europe they returned to Paspébiac with manufactured goods. The market for dry fish disappeared almost completely during the 20th century; the Company processed frozen fish for a number of years, but eventually that was given up as well.

There was a disastrous fire in 1964 that destroyed most of the original Robin buildings on Paspébiac Beach. The remaining ones on the site, which include the large Le Boutillier Bros warehouse, form the Site Historique du Banc de Paspébiac.

== Demographics ==
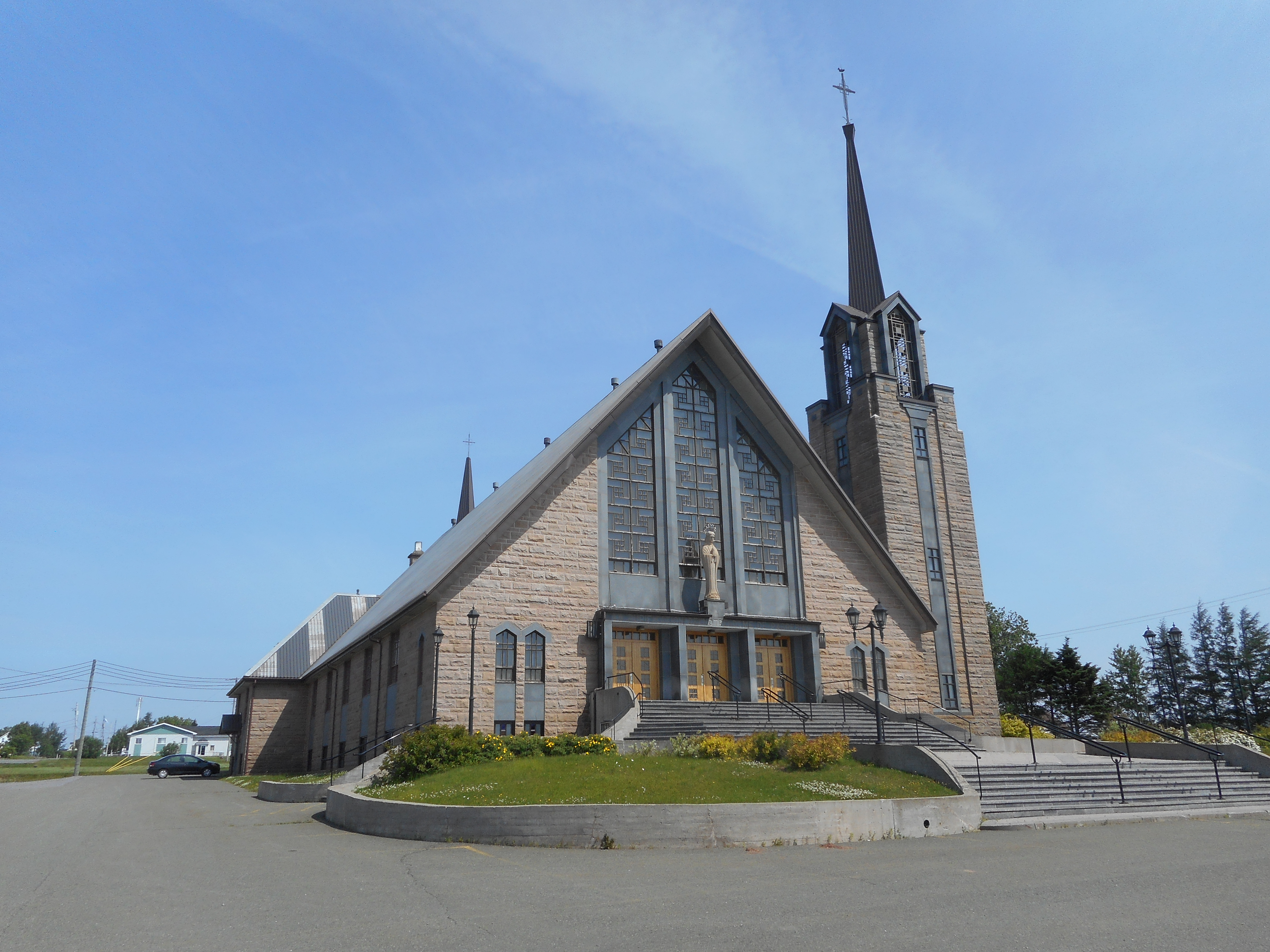
Our Lady of Purification Church in Paspebiac

In the 2021 Census of Population conducted by Statistics Canada, Paspébiac had a population of 3,033 living in 1,409 of its 1,501 total private dwellings, a change of −4.1% from its 2016 population of 3,164. With a land area of 94.98 km^{2} (36.67 sq mi), it had a population density of 31.9/km^{2} (82.7/sq mi) in 2021.

Canada census – Paspébiac community profile

	2021	2016	2011
Population	3,033 (-4.1% from 2016)	3,164 (-1.1% from 2011)	3,198 (-3.4%% from 2006)
Land area	94.98 km^{2} (36.67 sq mi)	94.47 km^{2} (36.48 sq mi)	94.54 km^{2} (36.50 sq mi)
Population density	31.9/km^{2} (83/sq mi)	33.5/km^{2} (87/sq mi)	33.8/km^{2} (88/sq mi)
Median age	56.4 (M: 54.4, F: 57.6)	54.2 (M: 52.9, F: 55.4)	51.7 (M: 50.9, F: 52.6)
Private dwellings	1,501 (total) 1,409 (occupied)	1,515 (total)	1,470 (total)
Median household income	$61,200	$54,741	$.N/A

Notes: 2011 income data for this area has been suppressed for data quality or confidentiality reasons.
Includes corrections and updates for 2006.
References: 2021 2016 2011

Historical Census Data - Paspébiac, Quebec

Year	Pop.	±%
1881	1,568	—
1891	1,749	+11.5%
1901	1,759	+0.6%
1911	1,994	+13.4%
1921	2,110	+5.8%
1931	1,790	−15.2%
1941	2,093	+16.9%
1951	2,326	+11.1%

Year	Pop.	±%
1956	2,468	+6.1%
1961	2,732	+10.7%
1966	2,885	+5.6%
1971	2,953	+2.4%
1976	3,167	+7.2%
1981	3,292	+3.9%
1986	3,070	−6.7%
1991	3,016	−1.8%

Year	Pop.	±%
1996	2,945	−2.4%
2001	3,326	+12.9%
2006	3,309	−0.5%
2011	3,198	−3.4%
2016	3,164	−1.1%
2021	3,033	−4.1%

Source: Statistics Canada

Mother tongue (2021):

- French only: 93.9%
- English only: 5.1%
- English and French: 0.8%
- Other language: 0.2%

== See also ==
- List of cities in Quebec
