= Fort Chambly =

Historic fort in Quebec, Canada

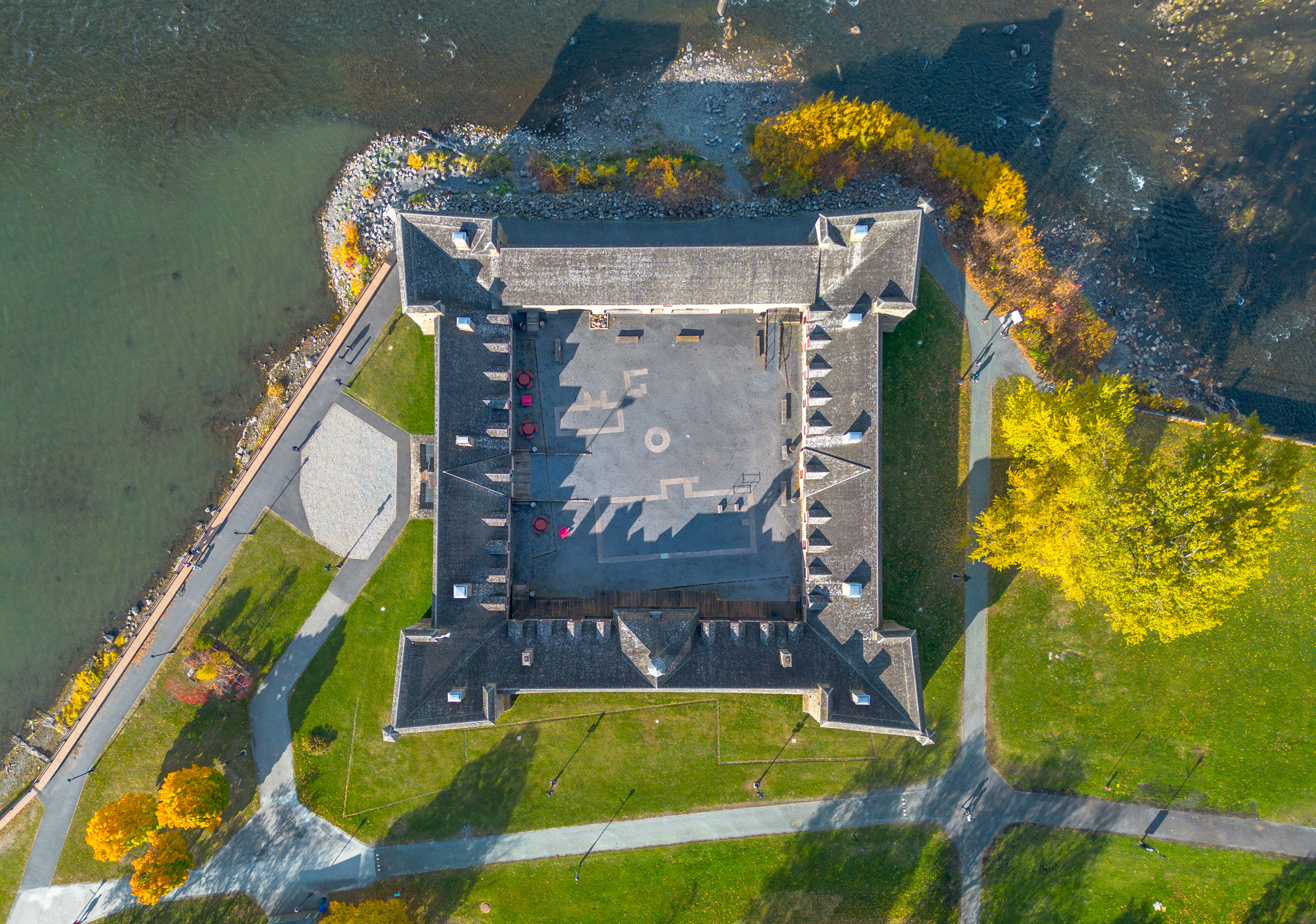
- Fort Chambly in 2025

Site information
- Type: Fort
- Controlled by: New France; Great Britain; Canada

Location
- Coordinates: 45°26′58″N 73°16′37″W

Site history
- Built: 1665
- In use: 1675–1776
- Battles/wars: Iroquois Wars — Seven Years' War — Invasion of Canada Campaign — American Revolution

National Historic Site of Canada
- Official name: Fort Chambly National Historic Site of Canada
- Designated: 1920

Fort Chambly is a historic fort in La Vallée-du-Richelieu Regional County Municipality, Quebec. It is designated as a National Historic Site of Canada. Fort Chambly was formerly known as Fort St. Louis. It was part of a series of five fortifications built along the Richelieu River to protect travellers on the river from the Iroquois. The region is informally known as la Vallée-des-Forts.

== History ==
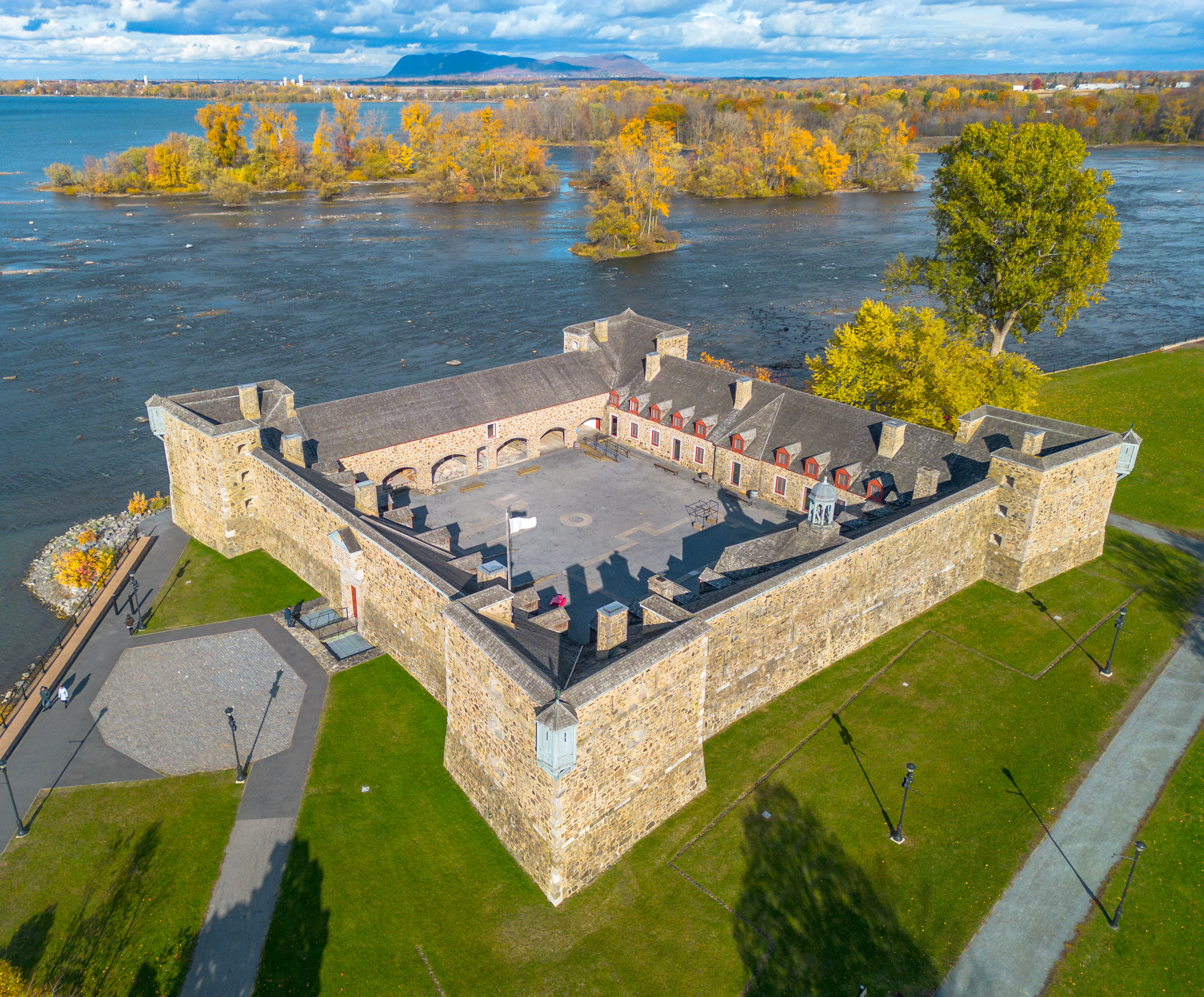
Fort Chambly overlooking the Chambly Rapids

Fort Chambly at the foot of the Chambly rapids on the Richelieu River in Quebec, Canada, was built by the French in 1711. It was the last of three forts to be built on the same site. The first — then called Fort Saint Louis — was constructed in 1665 by captain Jacques de Chambly, to protect New France from Iroquois attacks.

After minor repairs, the fort was burned by the Indians in 1702, but was reconstructed the same year. By then it was already known as Fort Chambly. However, with the Great Peace of Montreal in 1701, the war between the French and Iroquois was over. Also at this time the War of the Spanish Succession broke out, and boiled over into the colonies of France and England. Thus, to defend against a more powerful European attack, including the threat of cannon fire, Governor Philippe de Rigaud Vaudreuil ordered that the fort be rebuilt in stone in 1709. The engineer responsible for the design and construction of the new fort was Josué Boisberthelot de Beaucours. He also oversaw major improvements carried out on the fort between 1718 and 1720, modifications he felt would greatly increase the fort's defenses.

For many years Fort Chambly was the main footing of the defensive chain of fortifications along the Richelieu River, which was the easiest invasion route into New France. However, with the construction of Fort Saint-Frédéric (1731) and Fort Saint-Jean (1748) further south, Fort Chambly lost most of its defensive purpose and so was converted into a warehouse and rally-point for soldiers, although the fort was never abandoned. With the Seven Years' War, Fort Chambly was re-fortified and reoccupied, although it failed to stop the British from approaching Montreal and Quebec City.

The substantial stone structure which still stands today was lost to the British in August 1760 in the Montreal Campaign during the French and Indian War.

Captured by American forces on October 20, 1775, during the American Invasion of Canada of 1775–76, it was held until the spring of 1776 when it was evacuated and burned, as the Americans retreated southward to Fort Ticonderoga. Subsequently, prisoners-of-war from the Continental Army, including Colonel William Stacy, were held at Fort Chambly until the end of the American Revolutionary War.

During the occupation, the 1st Canadian Regiment, an Extra Continental regiment, was raised by James Livingston to support Colonial efforts in the American Revolutionary War during the invasion of Quebec. Livingston recruited men from Chambly, Quebec as early as September 1775, but a formal regimental designation was made by Richard Montgomery on November 20, 1775, with recognition by the Second Continental Congress following on January 8, 1776. The regiment, which never approached its authorized size of 1,000 men, saw action primarily in the Canadian theater and New York, and was disbanded on January 1, 1781.

After the Fenian Raids in the 1860s, during which the fort was reoccupied, it was allowed to fall into ruin. In 1881 a citizen of Chambly, Joseph-Octave Dion, personally repaired and restored the site. In the 20th century the Canadian government recognized Fort Chambly's cultural and historical worth and undertook its maintenance. Between 1965 and 1985 extensive archaeological digs were carried out, and today a fully reconstructed version of the final phase of Fort Chambly (1718–1720) is maintained by Parks Canada and is open to the public as the Fort Chambly National Historic Site of Canada.

== Legacy ==
On 28 June 1985 Canada Post issued 'Fort Chambly, Que.' one of the 20 stamps in the "Forts Across Canada Series" (1983 & 1985). The stamps are perforated 12 1/2 x 13 mm and were printed by Ashton-Potter Limited based on the designs by Rolf P. Harder.

== Gallery ==
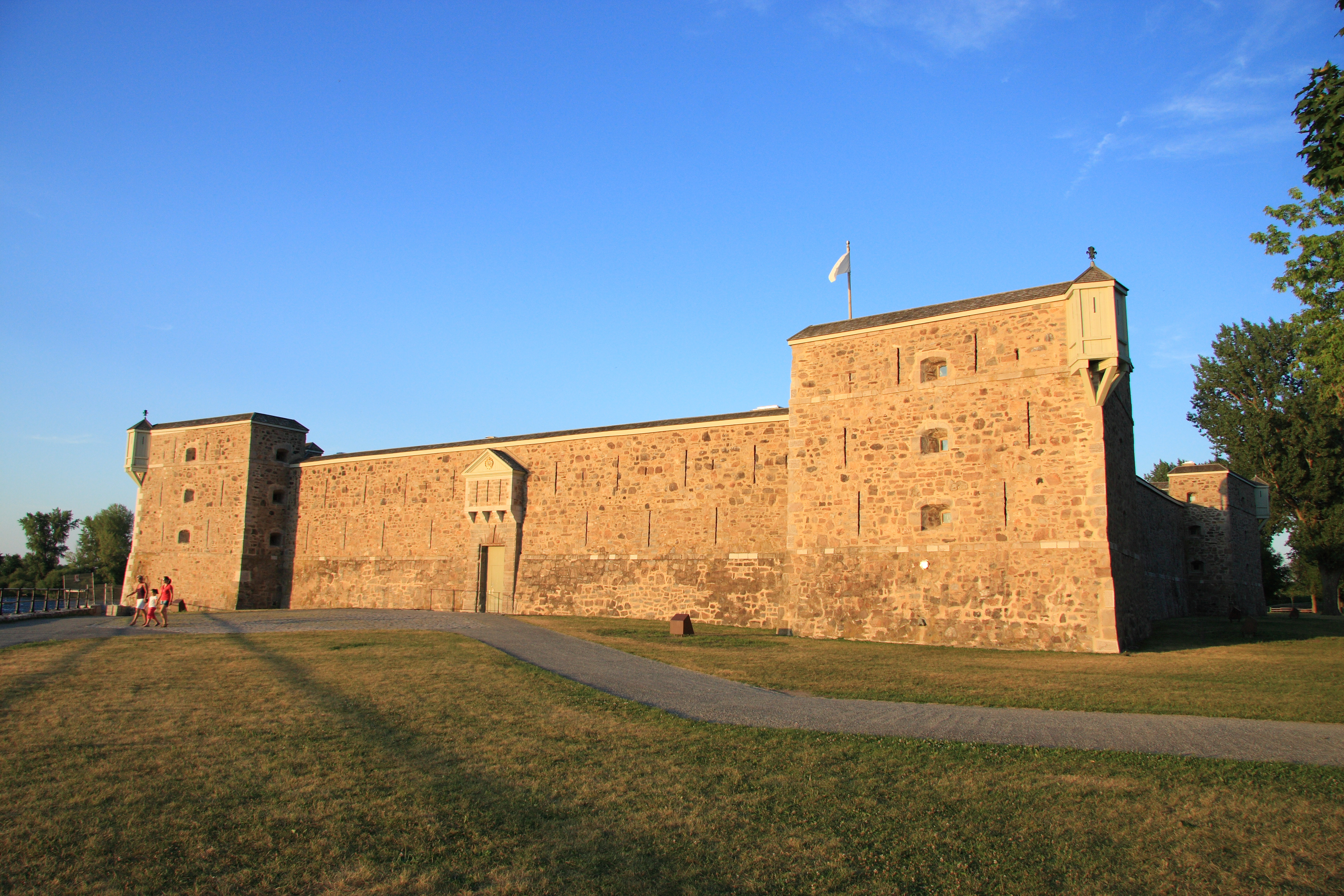
Fort Chambly in the Summer

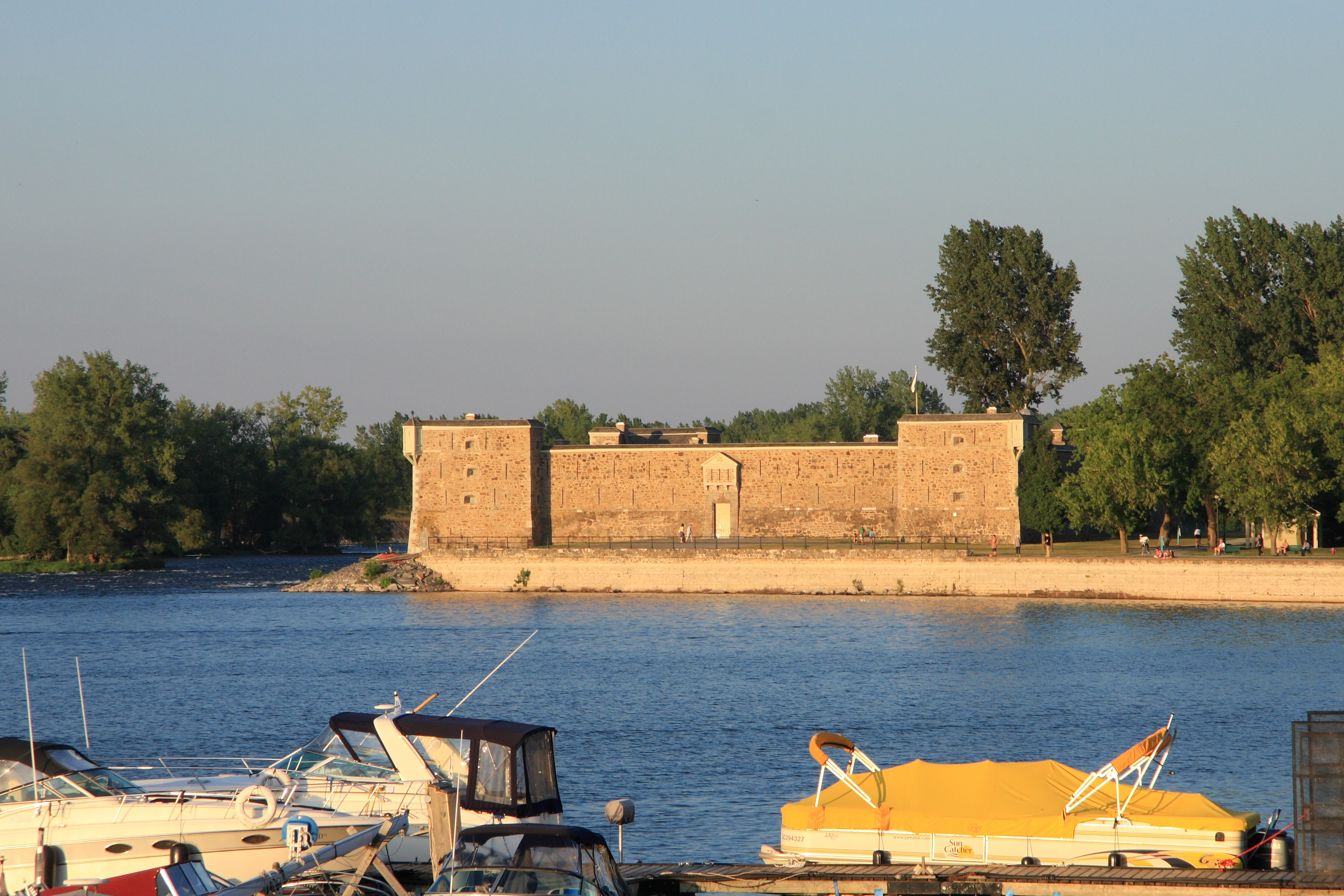
Fort Chambly from a distance

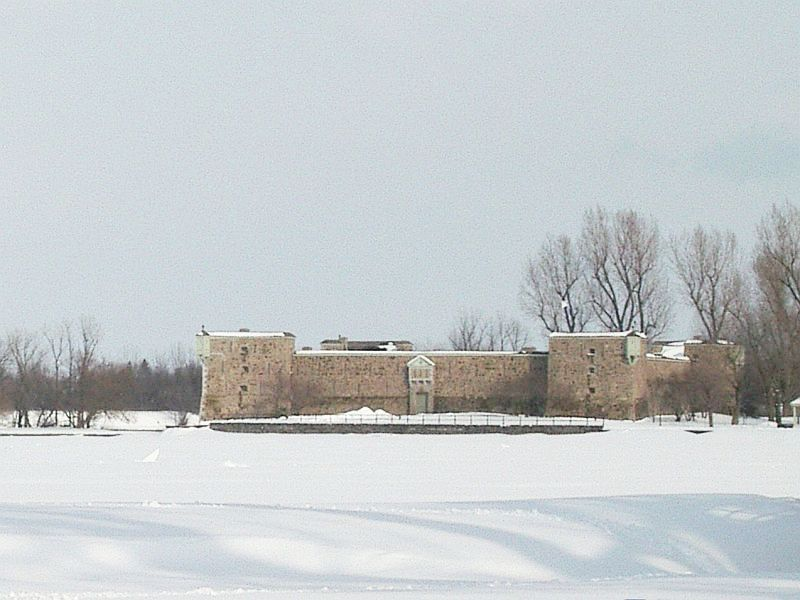
Fort Chambly in Winter

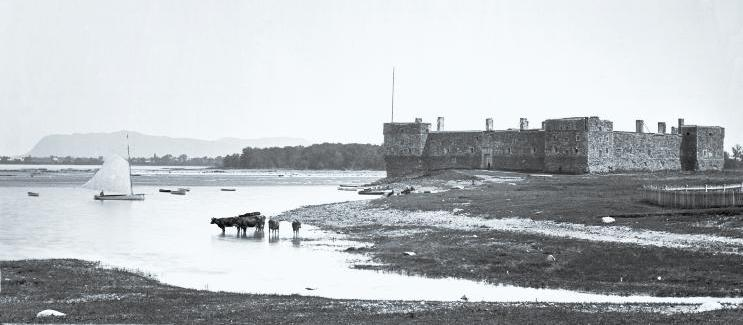
Fort Chambly 1863

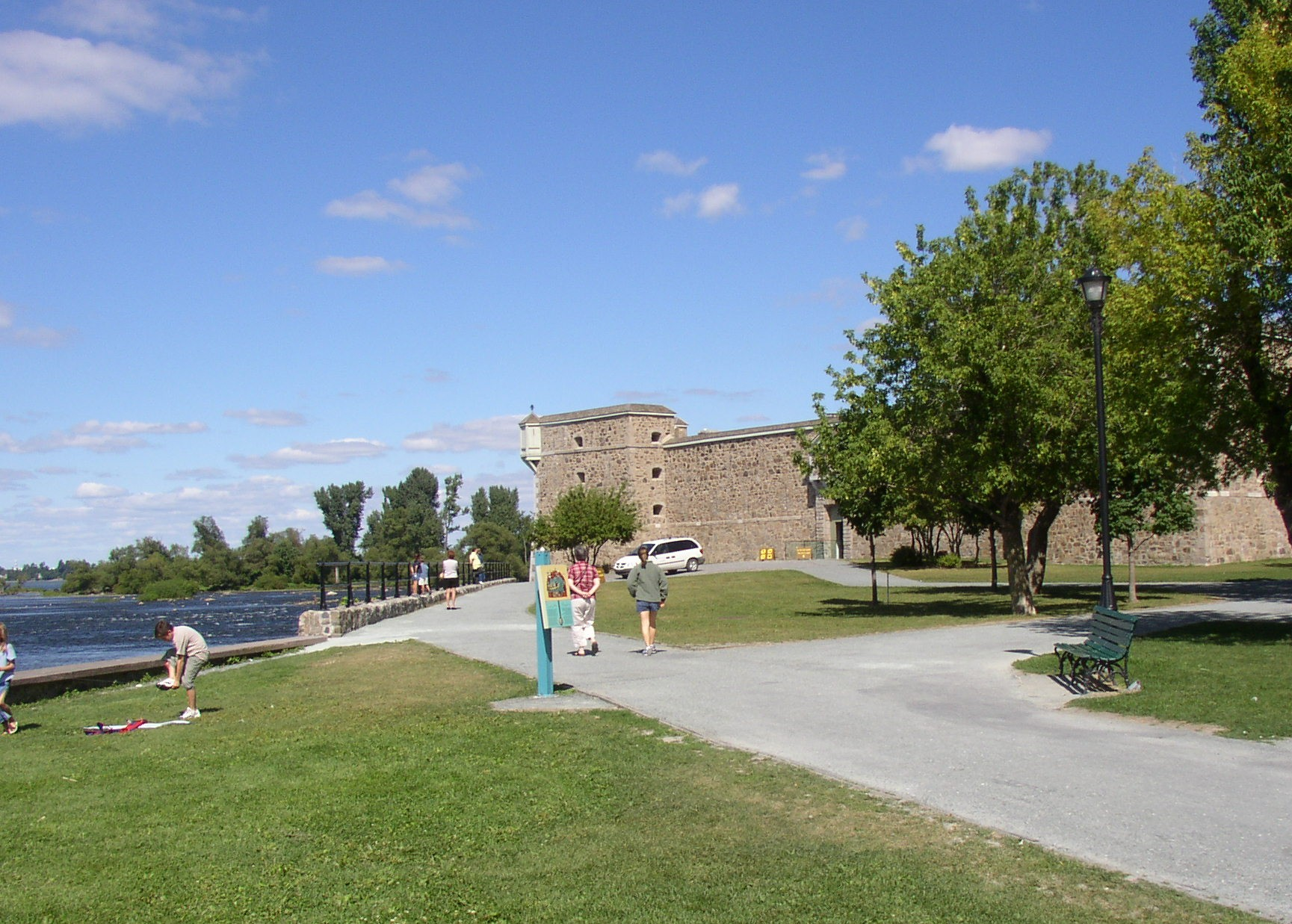
Fort Chambly 2002

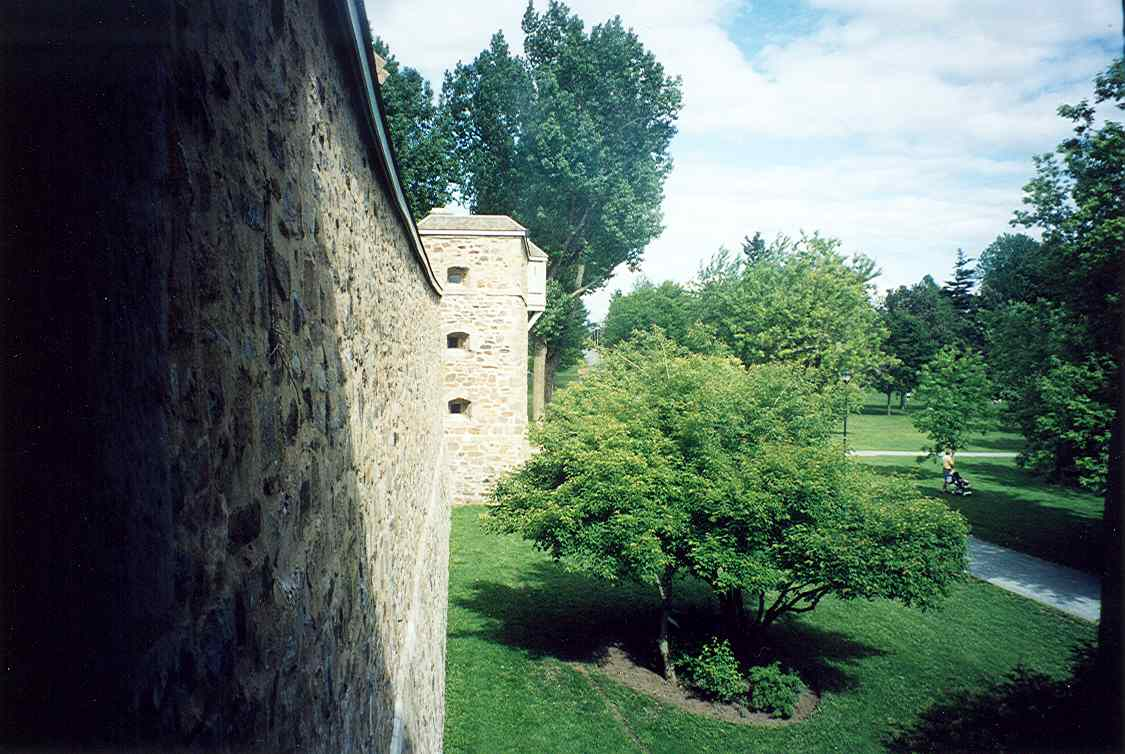
Fort Chambly walls

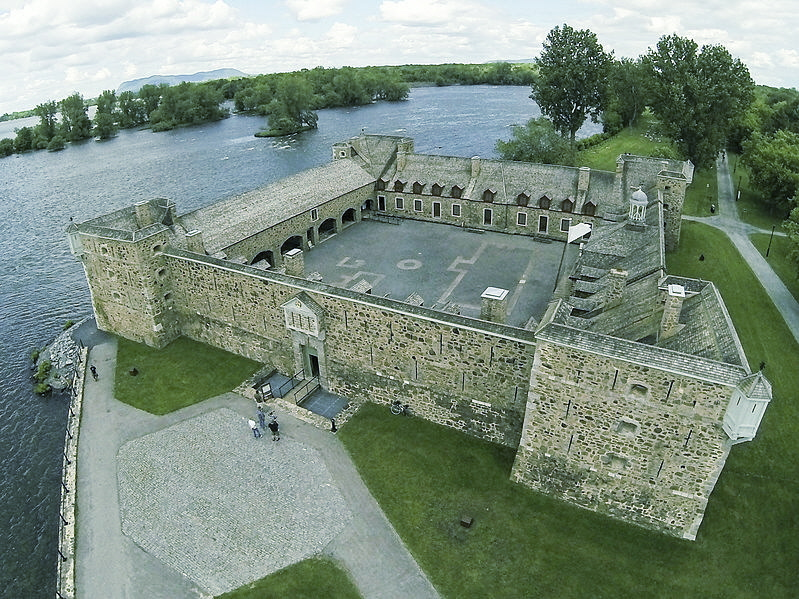
Aerial view of Fort Chambly

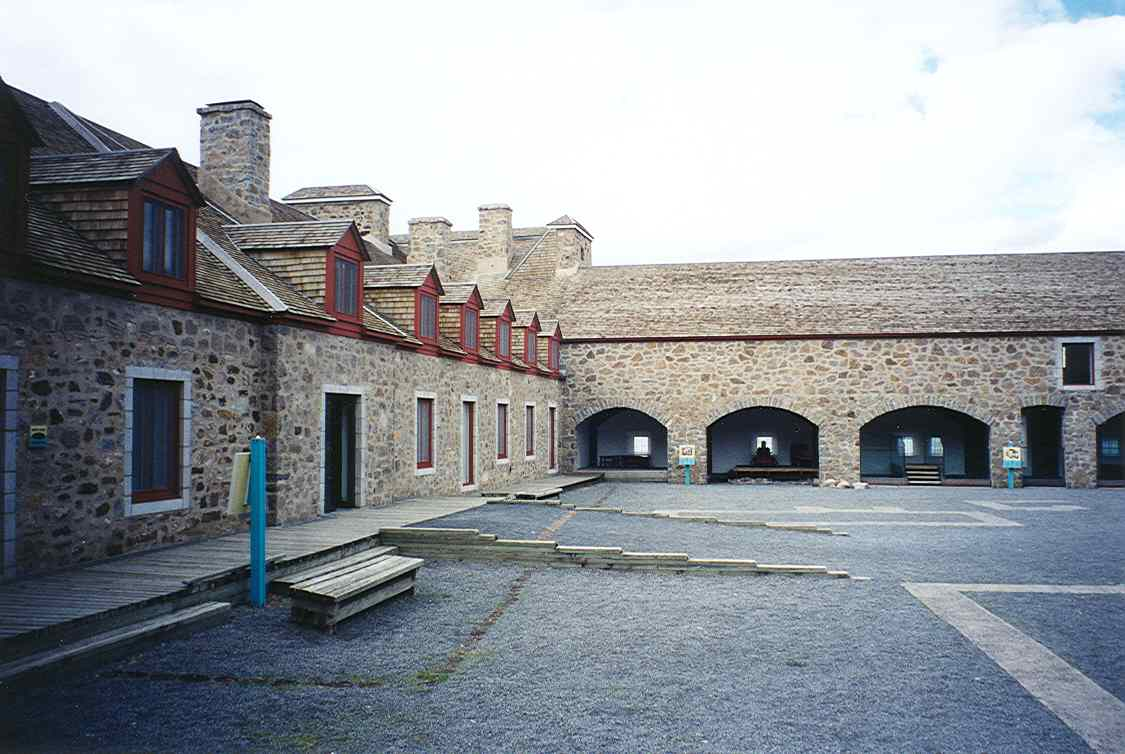
Place d'armes and cannon along river

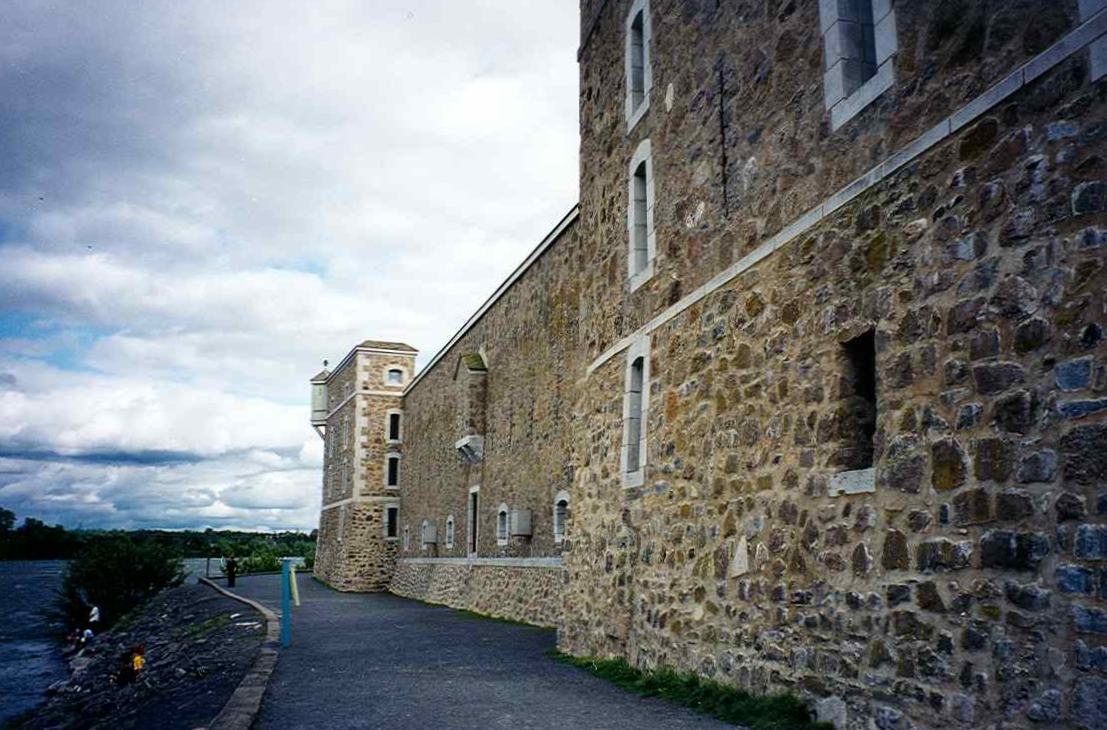
Wall along the Richelieu River

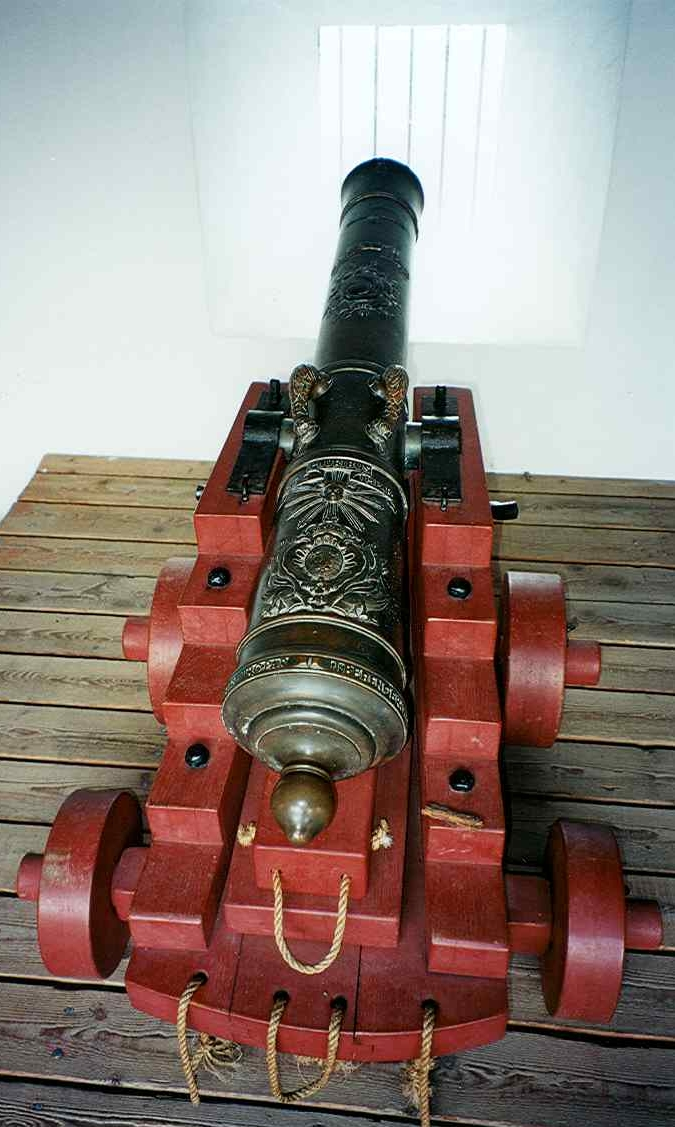
Fort Chambly cannon

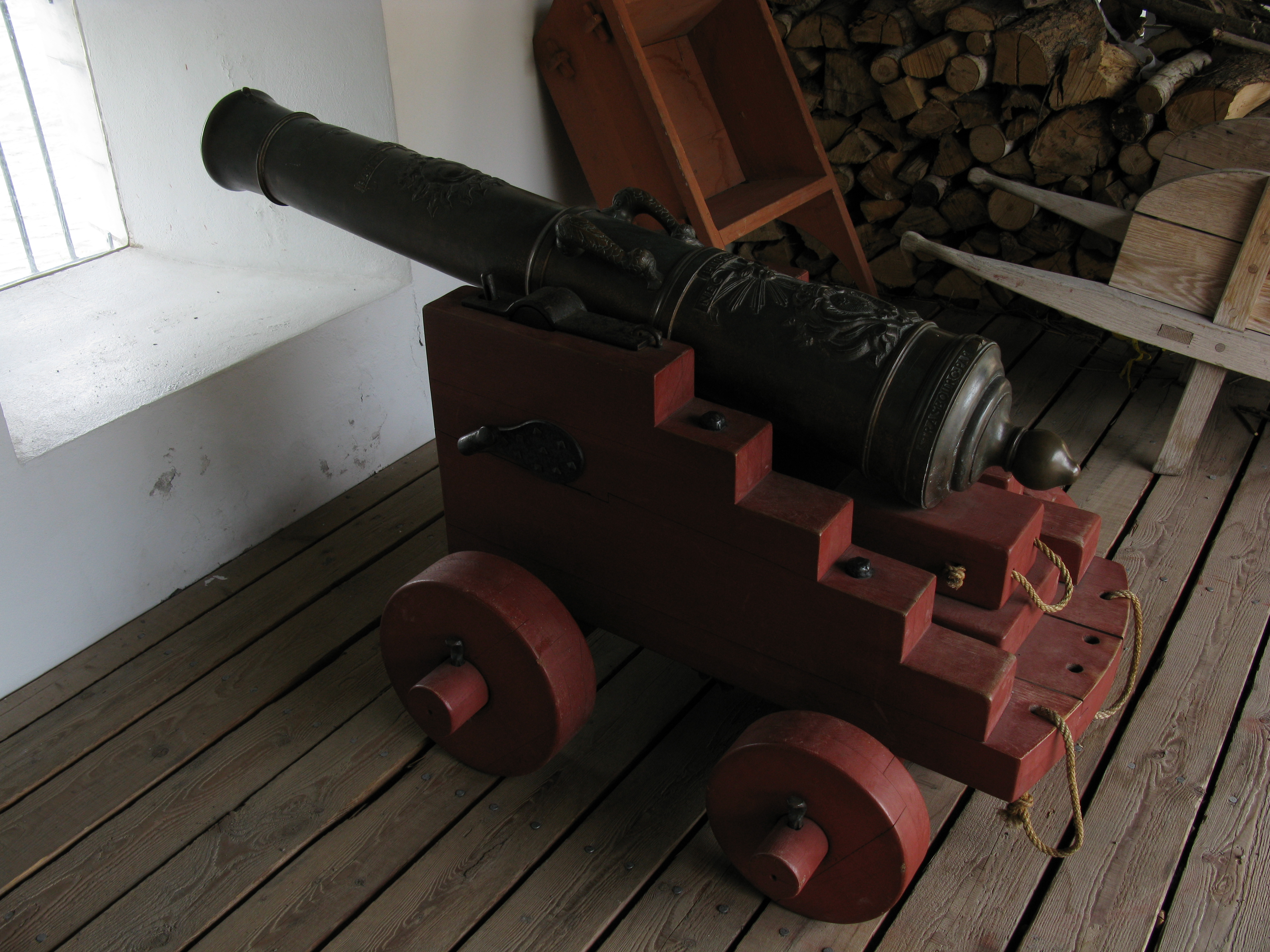
cannon in Fort Chambly

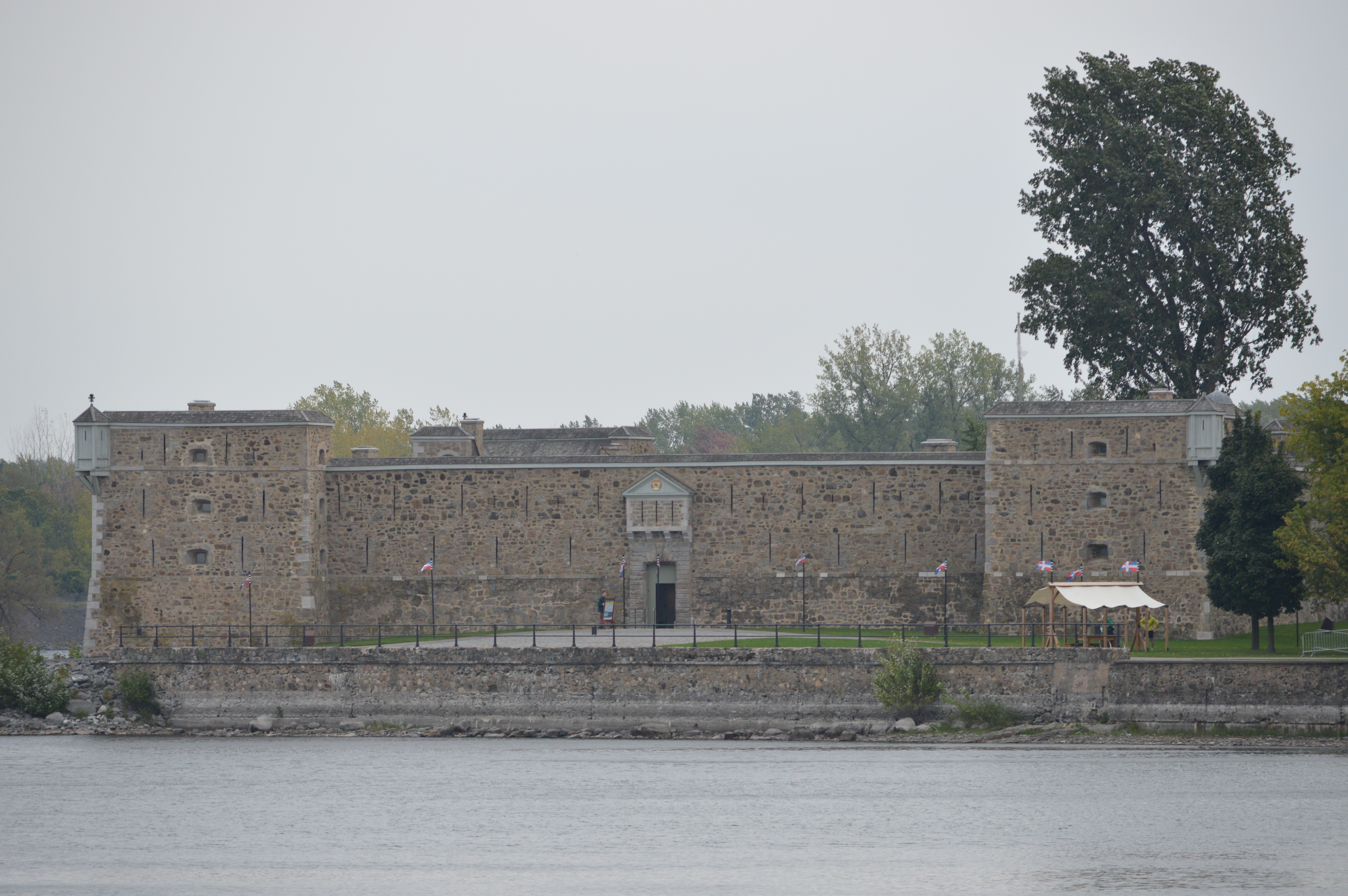
View of Fort Chambly in Chambly, Quebec, Canada.

== See also ==
- St. Stephen's Anglican Church, a church built in 1820 to serve soldiers garrisoned at the fort

== Bibliography ==
- Archaeology at Fort Chambly , by Pierre Beaudet and Celine Cloutier. Ottawa : National Historic Parks and Sites, Canadian Parks Services, 1989
- McHenry, Chris: Rebel Prisoners at Quebec 1778–1783, Being a List of American Prisoners Held by the British during the Revolutionary War, Lawrenceburg, Indiana (1981).
- The Role of Fort Chambly in the Development of New France, 1665–1760 , by Cyrille Gelinas. Ottawa : National Historic Parks and Sites, Canadian Parks Services, 1983
- Dictionary of American History by James Truslow Adams, New York: Charles Scribner's Sons, 1940
- Parks Canada, Fort Chambly National Historic Site brochure, 2007.
- America's Historic Lakes, Fort Chambly on the Richelieu River
- Aimone, Alan, The Siege and Capture of Forts Chambly and St. Johns in 1775, in The Journal of America's Military Past, Vol. 28, No. 2, Fall 2001.

== Affiliations ==
The Museum is affiliated with: CMA, CHIN, and Virtual Museum of Canada.
