= St. Stephen's Anglican Church (Chambly, Quebec) =

Anglican church in Quebec, Canada

- St. Stephen's with St. James Anglican Church of Chambly
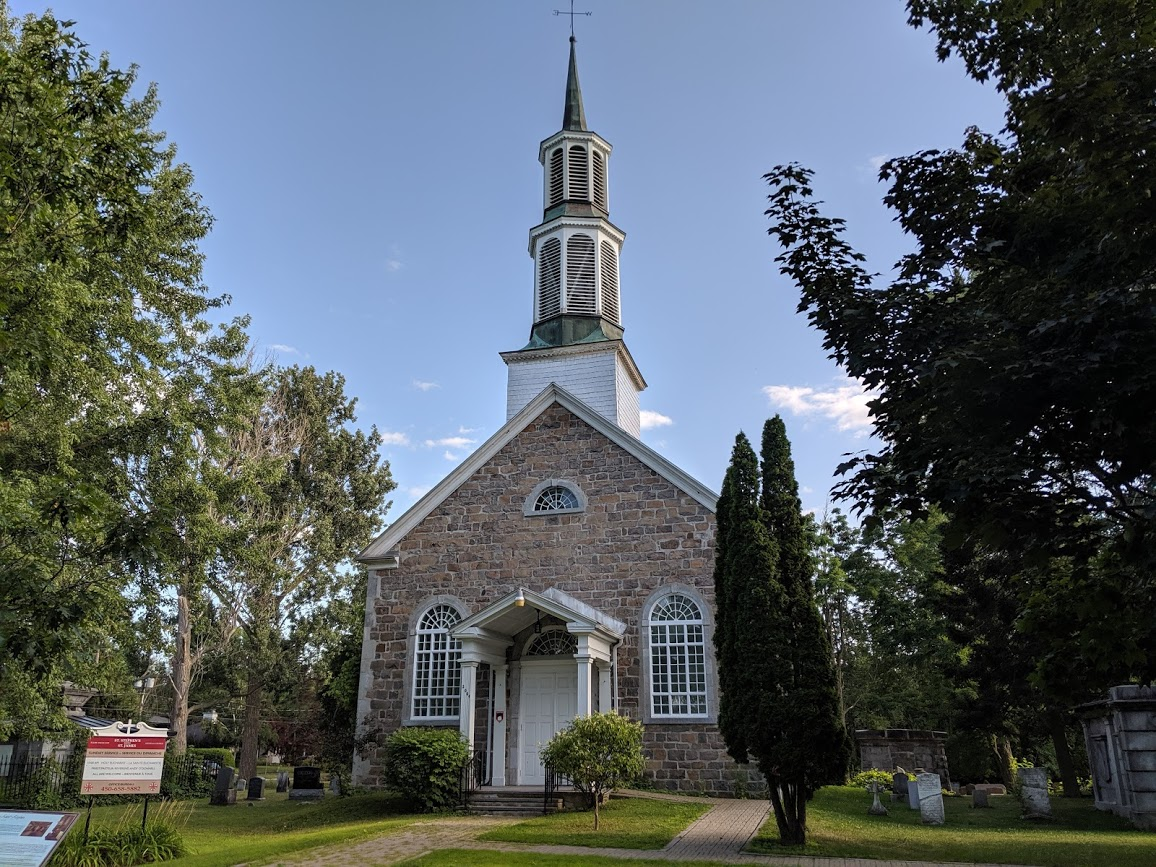
- St. Stephen's Anglican Church
- St. Stephen's Anglican Church
- 45°26′52″N 73°16′26″W
- Location: 2000 Bourgogne Street; Chambly, Quebec, Canada; J3L 1Z4
- Denomination: Anglican
- Website: www.st-stephens-church-chambly.org

History
- Status: active
- Founded: 1820

Architecture
- Heritage designation: National Historic Sites of Canada
- Designated: 1970
- Architect: Edward Parkin
- Architectural type: Palladian architecture
- Groundbreaking: 1820
- Completed: 1820

Specifications
- Length: 50
- Width: 30
- Height: 25
- Materials: Fieldstone

Administration
- Province: Canada
- Diocese: Montreal

Clergy
- Bishop: Mary Irwin-Gibson
- Abbot

National Historic Site of Canada
- Official name: St. Stephen's Anglican Church National Historic Site of Canada
- Designated: 1970

St. Stephen's Anglican Church is a church in Chambly, Quebec affiliated with the Anglican Church of Canada.

It was built in 1820 to serve the garrison of Fort Chambly as well as the Loyalist and English settler population in and around Chambly. It served both soldiers and civilians until the troops departed in 1869.

St. Stephen's Anglican Church was listed as a National Historic Site of Canada in February 1970. The Historic and Monuments Board of Canada cited it as an outstanding example of early 19th-century Canadian ecclesiastical architecture. It is located near the Fort Chambly National Historic Site of Canada, the Richelieu River and the Chambly Canal.
