= Notre-Dame-des-Sept-Douleurs, Quebec =

Notre-Dame-des-Sept-Douleurs
- Parish municipality
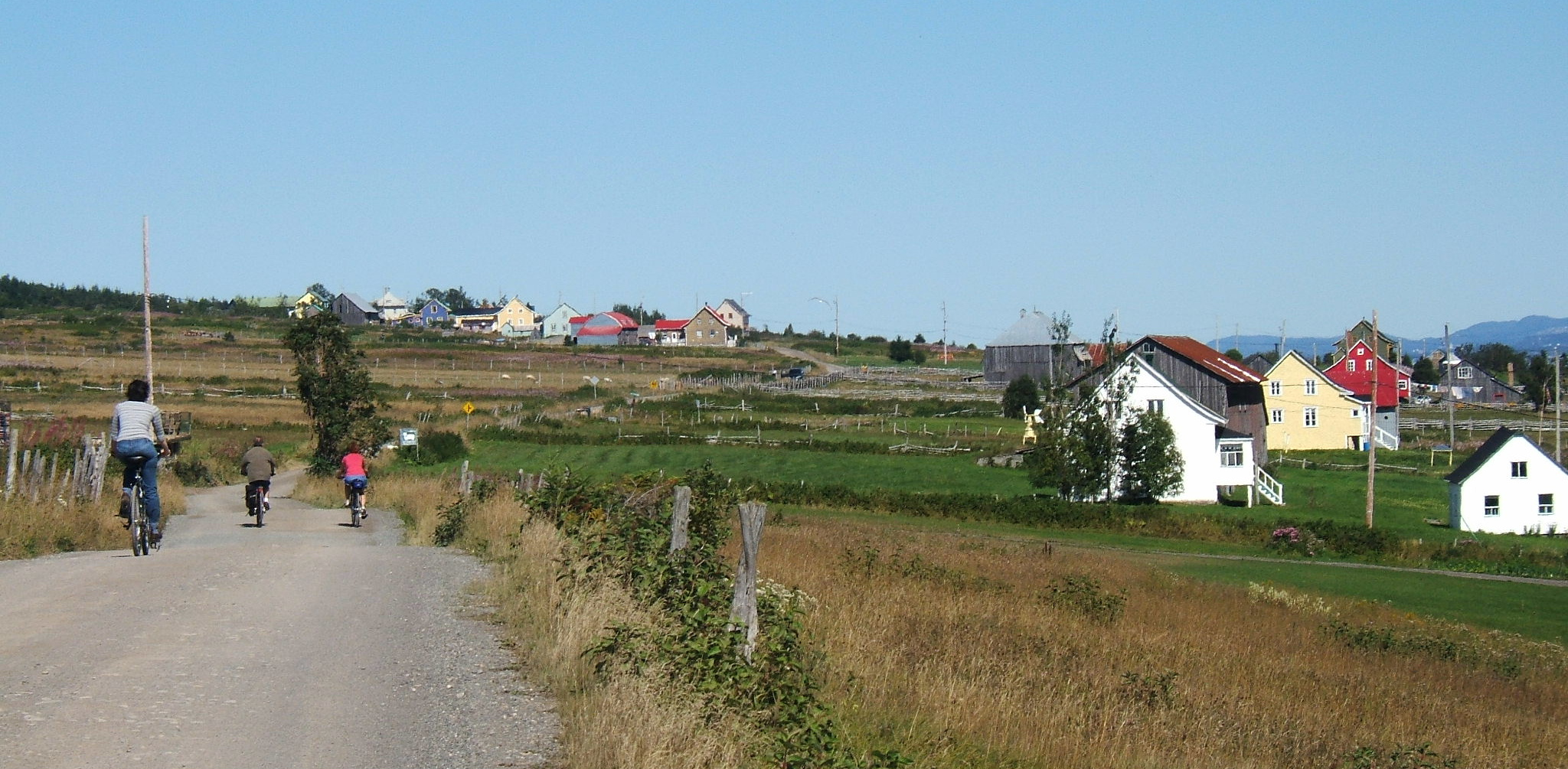
- chemin de l'Île

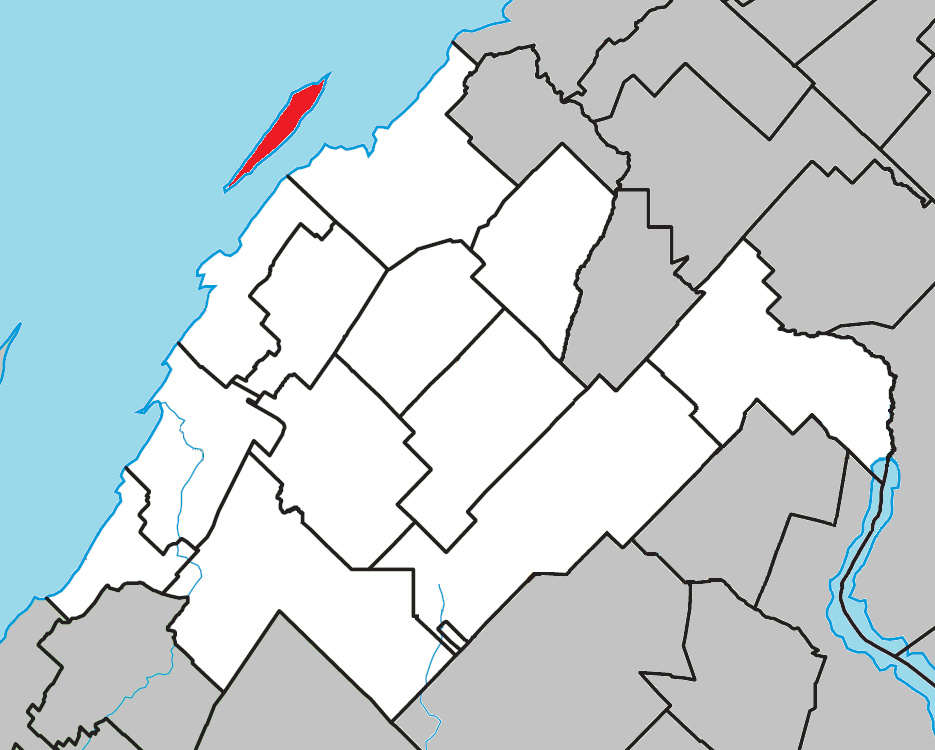
- Location within Rivière-du-Loup RCM

- Location in eastern Quebec
- Coordinates: 48°00′N 69°27′W
- Country: Canada
- Province: Quebec
- Region: Bas-Saint-Laurent
- RCM: Rivière-du-Loup
- Constituted: 1 January 1874

Government
  - Mayor: Louise Newbury
  - Federal riding: Côte-du-Sud—Rivière-du-Loup—Kataskomiq—Témiscouata
  - Prov. riding: Rivière-du-Loup–Témiscouata–Les Basques

Area
  - Total: 142.85 km^{2} (55.15 sq mi)
  - Land: 11.53 km^{2} (4.45 sq mi)

Population (2021)
  - Total: 71
  - Density: 6.2/km^{2} (16/sq mi)
  - Pop 2016-2021: ▲97.2%
  - Dwellings: 117
- Time zone: UTC−5 (EST)
  - Summer (DST): UTC−4 (EDT)
- Postal code(s): G0L 1K0
- Area codes: 418 and 581
- Highways: No major routes
- Website: www.ileverte-municipalite.com

Notre-Dame-des-Sept-Douleurs (French pronunciation: [nɔtʁədam de sɛt dulœʁ], meaning "Our Lady of the Seven Sorrows") is an island municipality in the Bas-Saint-Laurent region of Quebec, Canada, part of the Rivière-du-Loup Regional County Municipality. It is located on and contiguous with Île Verte (French for "Green Island") in the Estuary of St. Lawrence, about 20 kilometres (12 mi) north-east of Rivière-du-Loup. The name Île Verte was given in 1621 by Samuel de Champlain written "Isle Verte".

With a population of only 71 persons, Notre-Dame-des-Sept-Douleurs is one of the smallest municipalities in Canada. It is home to the oldest lighthouse in Quebec (built in 1809).

The main economic activities are fishing and tourism. Many fish smokehouses are present on the island. In addition to the oldest lighthouse in Quebec, its pastoral character, skeleton museum, many artists and heritage homes also attract tourists.

== History ==
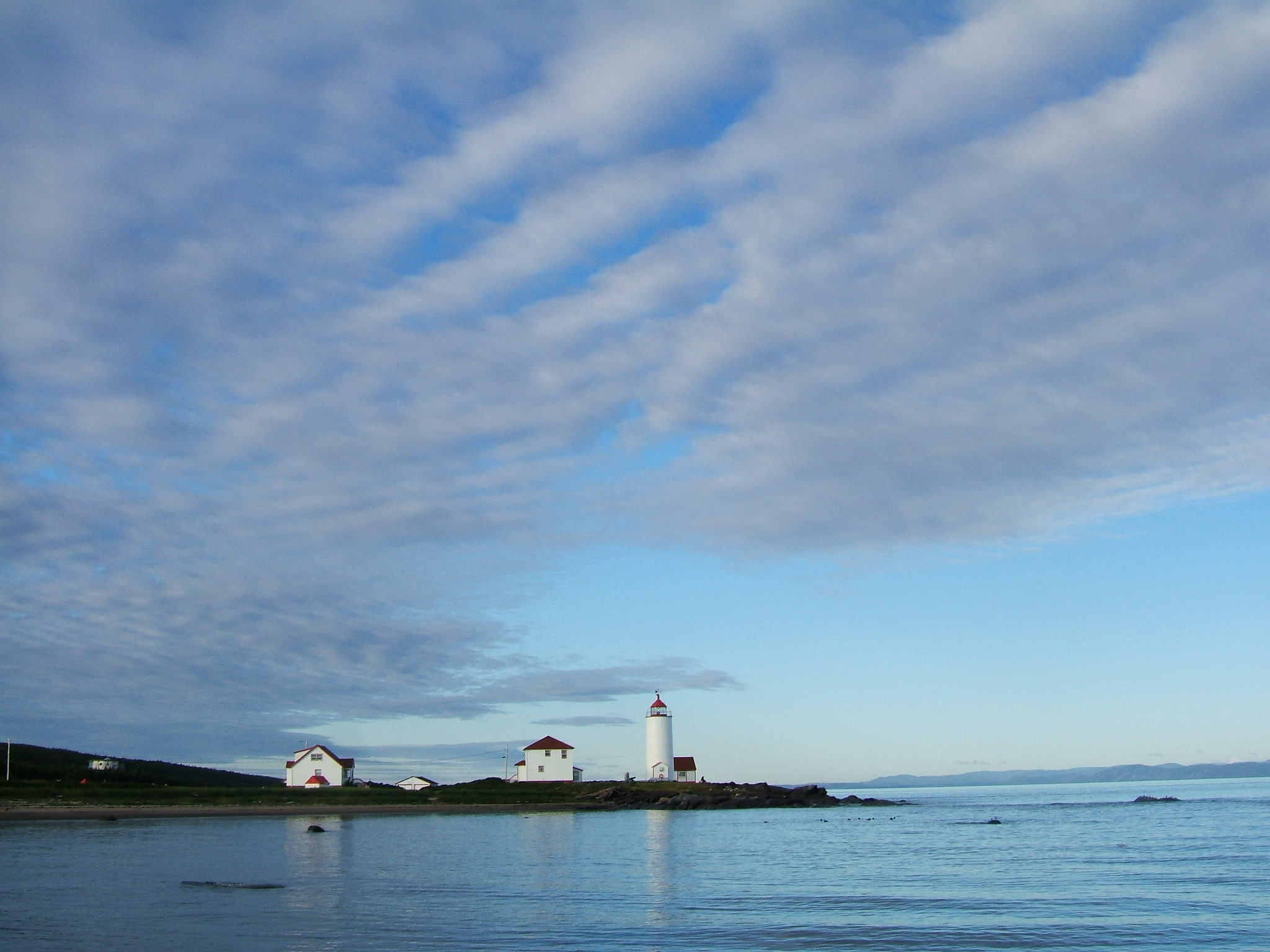
Lighthouse on Île Verte

The island was first mentioned in the Jesuit Reports of 1663 following a shipwreck which forced Henri Nouvel to stay there for about ten days.

On 10 June 1816, half the Nova Scotia Fencibles, some 210 officers and other ranks, together with 48 wives and children, were on board the Archduke Charles when it wrecked near Green Island. Four soldiers, two wives, and two children lost their lives.

In 1874, the municipality was formed out of the parish of La Décollation-de-Saint-Jean-Baptiste on 18 November, which led to its name "Notre-Dame-des-Sept-Douleurs" since this date corresponded to the Day of Our Lady of Sorrows on the liturgical calendar at that time. However the municipality only existed on paper. The community formed in isolation and life on the island was governed by traditional customs, so people had little need for municipal management, which would have been a family affair anyway. Finally on 5 February 1912, the first council meeting took place.

Today, the biggest family to occupy the Island is the Fraser of Scottish Canadian descent.

== Geography ==
Verte Island is about 2 kilometres (1.2 mi) from the south shore of the St. Lawrence River, roughly 12 kilometres (7.5 mi) long with a maximum width of 1.8 kilometres (1.1 mi). It has a maximum elevation of 60 metres (200 ft).

== Demographics ==
In the 2021 Census of Population conducted by Statistics Canada, Notre-Dame-des-Sept-Douleurs had a population of 71 living in 46 of its 117 total private dwellings, a change of 97.2% from its 2016 population of 36. With a land area of 11.53 km^{2} (4.45 sq mi), it had a population density of 6.2/km^{2} (15.9/sq mi) in 2021.

Historical census populations –
Notre-Dame-des-Sept-Douleurs, Quebec

Year	Pop.	±%
1911	365	—
1921	341	−6.6%
1931	309	−9.4%
1941	340	+10.0%
1951	305	−10.3%
1956	287	−5.9%
1961	240	−16.4%
1966	207	−13.7%
1971	175	−15.5%
1976	121	−30.9%

Year	Pop.	±%
1981	99	−18.2%
1986	64	−35.4%
1991	44	−31.2%
1996	42	−4.5%
2001	44	+4.8%
2006	62	+40.9%
2011	49	−21.0%
2016	36	−26.5%
2021	71	+97.2%

Source: Statistics Canada

Mother tongue (2021):

- English as first language: 0%
- French as first language: 100%
- English and French as first language: 0%
- Other as first language: 0%

== Attractions ==
Thanks to its isolation, the island has preserved its high-quality architectural heritage, such as the Île-Verte Lighthouse, and a rural landscape from another era that is attracting more and more tourists.

== See also ==
- List of parish municipalities in Quebec
