= Île-Verte Lighthouse =

Lighthouse in Notre-Dame-des-Sept-Douleurs, Quebec, Canada

Île-Verte Lighthouse Phare de l'Île-Verte
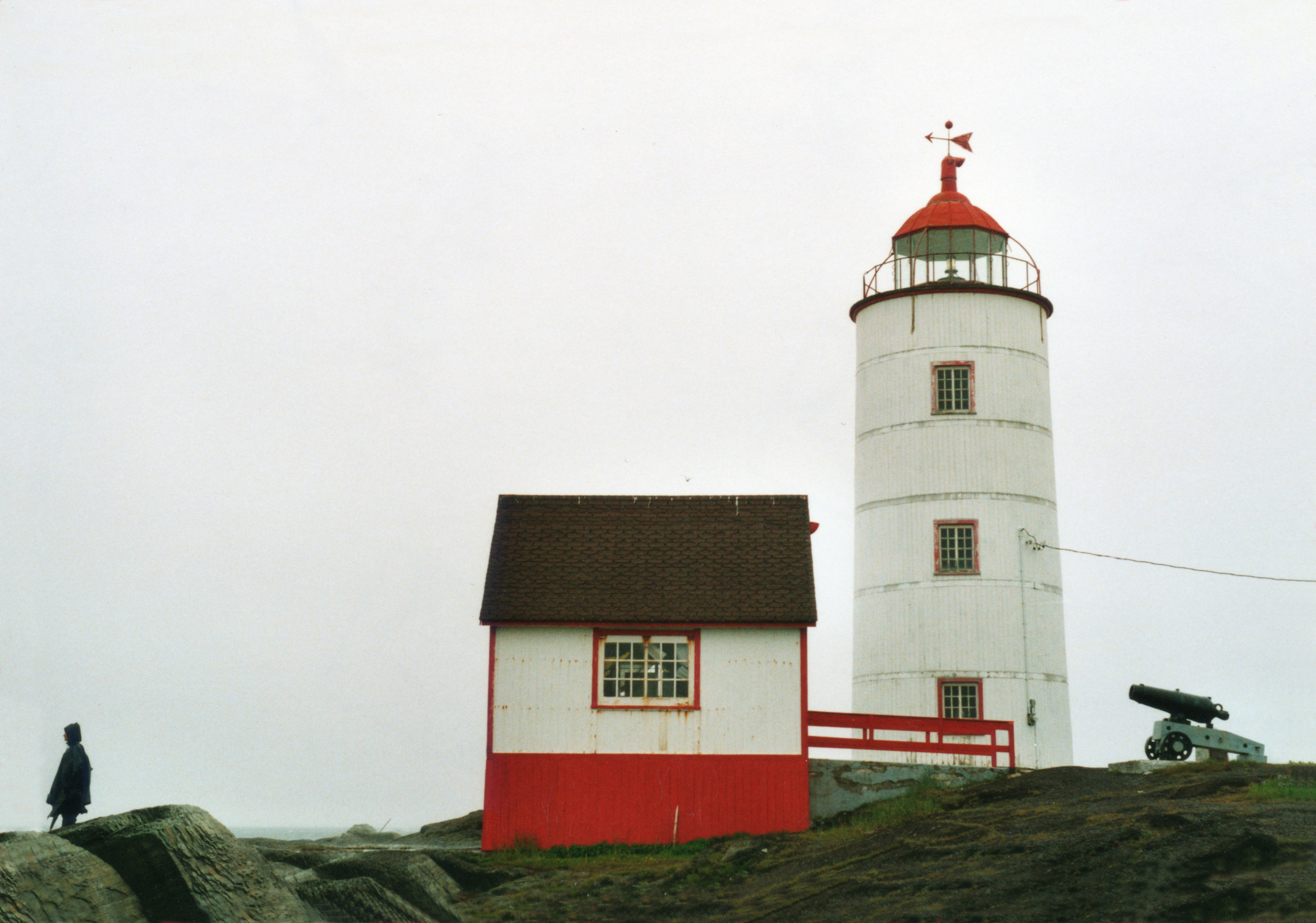
- Île-Verte Lighthouse
- Location: Notre-Dame-des-Sept-Douleurs; Quebec; Canada
- Coordinates: 48°03′04″N 69°25′27″W

Tower
- Constructed: 1809
- Construction: stone tower
- Height: 17 metres (56 ft)
- Shape: cylindrical tower with balcony and lantern
- Markings: white tower, red lantern and trim
- Heritage: national Historic Sites of Canada, heritage lighthouse, classified heritage immovable, part of a Quebec heritage property

Light
- Focal height: 16.5 metres (54 ft)
- Range: 19 nautical miles (35 km; 22 mi)
- Characteristic: Fl W 5s.
- Canada no.: 1761

National Historic Site of Canada
- Official name: Île-Verte Lighthouse National Historic Site of Canada
- Designated: 1974

Île-Verte Lighthouse is a lighthouse on Île Verte in Notre-Dame-des-Sept-Douleurs, Quebec, Canada. Completed in 1809, it is the oldest lighthouse on the Saint Lawrence River and the third oldest in Canada. The Lighttower, which is 17 metres (56 ft) in height.

== History ==
Constructed between 1806 and 1809 on behalf of Trinity House in Quebec City, the lighthouse was responsible for the improvement and surveillance of the lower Saint Lawrence River. It was among the first lighthouses built in Canada, and was the first built on the banks of the Saint Lawrence. The Île-Verte Lighthouse illustrates the expansion of trade and navigation in the early nineteenth century and was an important milestone in the development of a network of safe waterways in Canada.

== Keepers ==
- Charles Hembleton 1809-1827
- Robert Noel Lindsay 1827-1867
- Gilbert Lindsay 1867-1888
- Irenee Lindsay 1888-1927
- Joseph-Alfred Lindsay 1927-1964
- Armand Lafrance 1964-1972

The last lighthouse keeper left in 1972.

== Legacy ==
The Île-Verte Lighthouse served as a prototype for the construction of other lighthouses along the St. Lawrence, by its masonry construction, its cylindrical shape, small size and its overall simplicity. The longevity of the building and its continued use attest to the success of this design, which proved highly functional, as well as to the quality of materials and construction.

== Heritage ==
The Île-Verte lighthouse reinforces the austerity of its location on the coast. The building is an important landmark in the region and is now a tourist attraction and a source of pride in the region.

Federal Building, it was classified a historic monument of the National Historic Sites of Canada in 1974 because of its historical importance, its relevance in terms of architecture and the special place it occupies in its environment.

== See also ==
- List of lighthouses in Canada
