= Battle of La Prairie =

1691 failed English colonial expeditions against Montreal during King William's War

- Part of King William's War and the Beaver Wars
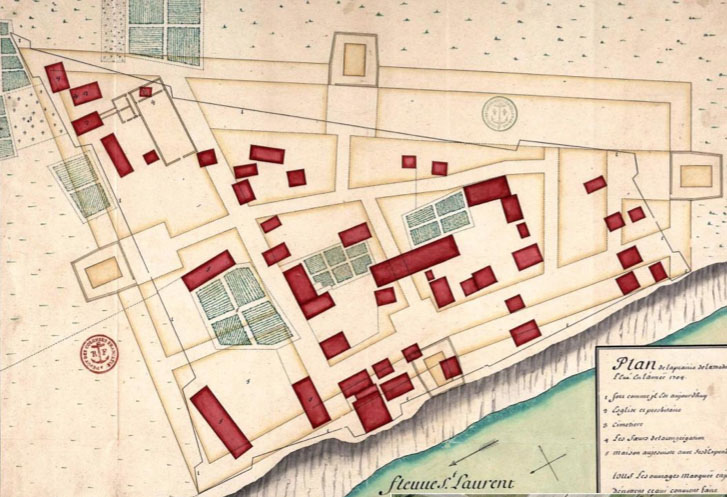
- 1704 map of La Prairie
| Date | August 11, 1691 |
| Location | La Prairie, New France |
| Result | French victory |

Belligerents
| France; New France | New York; England; Mohawk; Mohicans |

Commanders and leaders
| Callière | Pieter Schuyler |

Strength
| 700–800 regulars, militia and Indians | 120 militia 146 Indians |

Casualties and losses
| 45 killed 60 wounded | 37 killed 31 wounded |

The Battle of La Prairie was an attack made on the French colonial settlement of La Prairie, New France on August 11, 1691 by an English, Mohawk and Mohican force coming north from Albany, New York. The force, led by Major Pieter Schuyler, initially intended to attack Montreal, but was repulsed with significant casualties by the French and their Indian allies.

== Background ==
During the summer of 1691, an English and Indian force led by Major Pieter Schuyler, consisting of 120 militiamen from Albany and 146 warriors from the Mohawk and Mohican tribes, attacked French colonial settlements along the Richelieu River south of Montreal. Louis-Hector de Callière, the local French governor, responded by amassing 700-800 French marines, militiamen and Indian allies at Fort Laprairie, on the south shore of the Saint Lawrence River.

== Battle ==
Schuyler's men surprised the much larger French force in a rainstorm just before dawn on August 11, inflicting severe casualties before withdrawing towards the Richelieu River. The Anglo-Indian force might have remained intact but instead was intercepted by a French force of 160 men led by Philippe Clément du Vuault de la Valrennes that had been detached to block the road to Chambly. The two sides fought in vicious hand-to-hand combat for approximately an hour, before Schuyler's men broke through the French and retreated.

== Aftermath ==
The French had suffered the most casualties during Schuyler's initial ambush, but the casualties the Albany force suffered after Valrennes' counterattack meant that they had incurred the greater proportion of loss. Instead of continuing his raids, Schuyler was forced to retreat back to Albany. The battle was also the subject of a 19th-century poem by William Douw Schuyler-Lighthall. In 1921, the site of Valrennes' counterattack was designated a National Historic Site of Canada.
