= Lakes to Locks Passage =

Scenic route in Canada and the United States

Lakes to Locks Passage
- Route du Richelieu (Quebec segment)
- Lakes to Locks Passage highlighted in red, Route du Richelieu in blue

Route information
- Existed: 2002 (US); 2012 (Quebec)–present

Highway route
- South end: Waterford, New York
- North end: Sorel-Tracy, Quebec

Waterway route
- South end: Cohoes, New York
- North end: Sorel-Tracy, Quebec

Location
- Countries: United States, Canada
- Provinces: Québec
- States: New York

Highway system
- Scenic highways

The Lakes to Locks Passage in the United States and the corresponding Route du Richelieu in Canada form a scenic byway network located in northeastern New York and southern Quebec. This byway connects a series of water routes including the upper Hudson River, Champlain Canal, Lake George, and Lake Champlain. This network is part of a historically significant transportation route linking upstate New York with the Canadian province of Quebec.

In the United States, the Lakes to Locks Passage is designated as a New York State Scenic Byway, a National Scenic Byway, and an All-American Road. The Canadian portion, known as Route du Richelieu, is recognized by the Quebec Ministry of Tourism as a tourist route.

The Lakes to Locks Passage and Route du Richelieu initiatives aim to promote and integrate these routes as a unified travel destination.

== Route description ==
The Lakes to Locks Passage extends from just north of Albany to near the Canada–US border at Rouses Point in New York. The route includes both a highway and a waterway, with the waterway continuing north into Canada and connecting with the St. Lawrence River.

The region's history is reflected in the diverse influences of French, English, and Dutch settlers, which can be seen in the architecture and cultural heritage of the communities along the rivers, waterfalls, and lakeshores. Along the byway, 32 designated Waypoint Communities offer various local attractions and services. These communities have established museums and other points of interest that function as Heritage Centers for the Lakes to Locks Passage. Additionally, many communities provide options for driving, biking, or walking tours to explore the area.

=== Highway ===
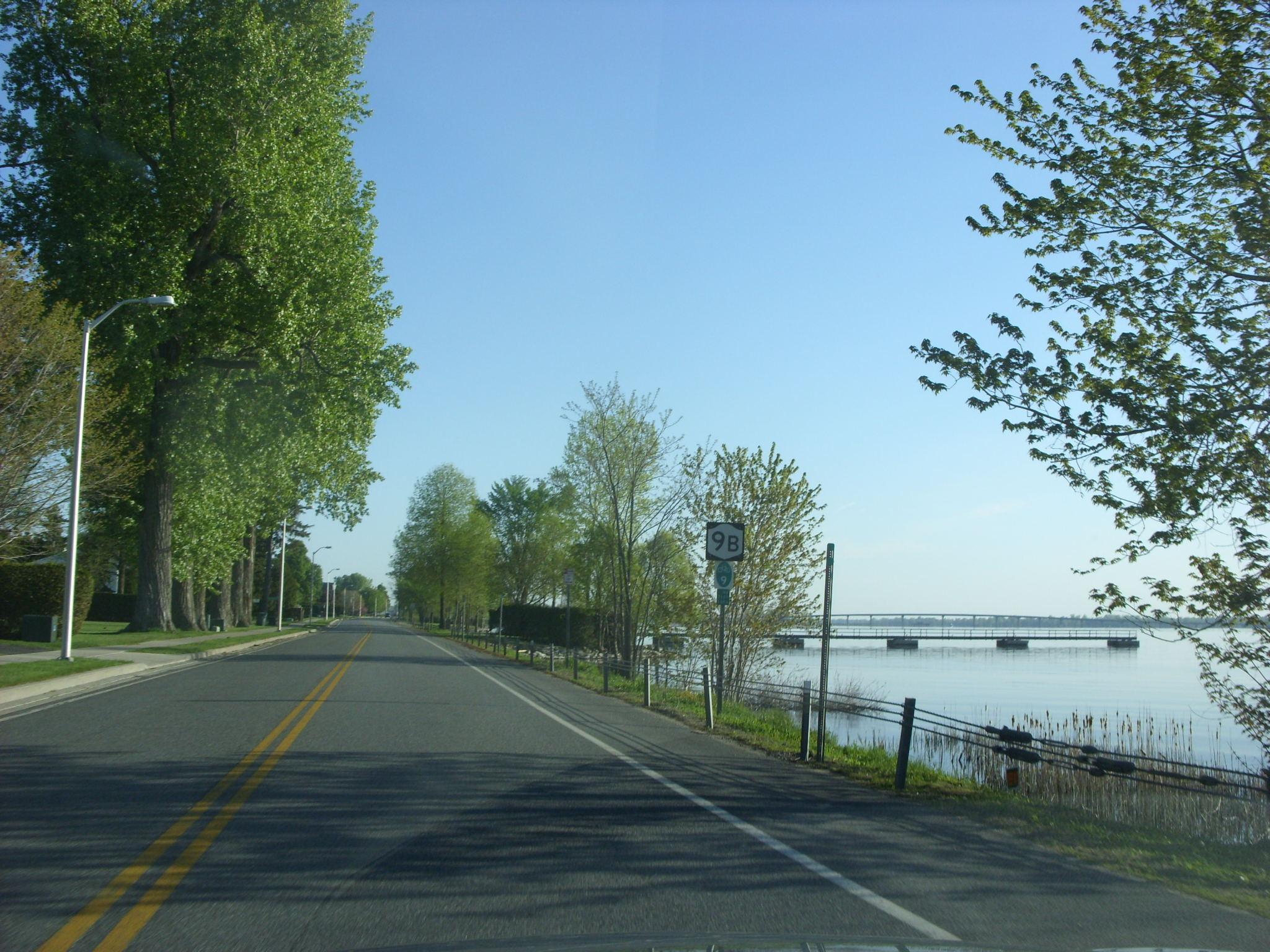
NY 9B near Rouse Point

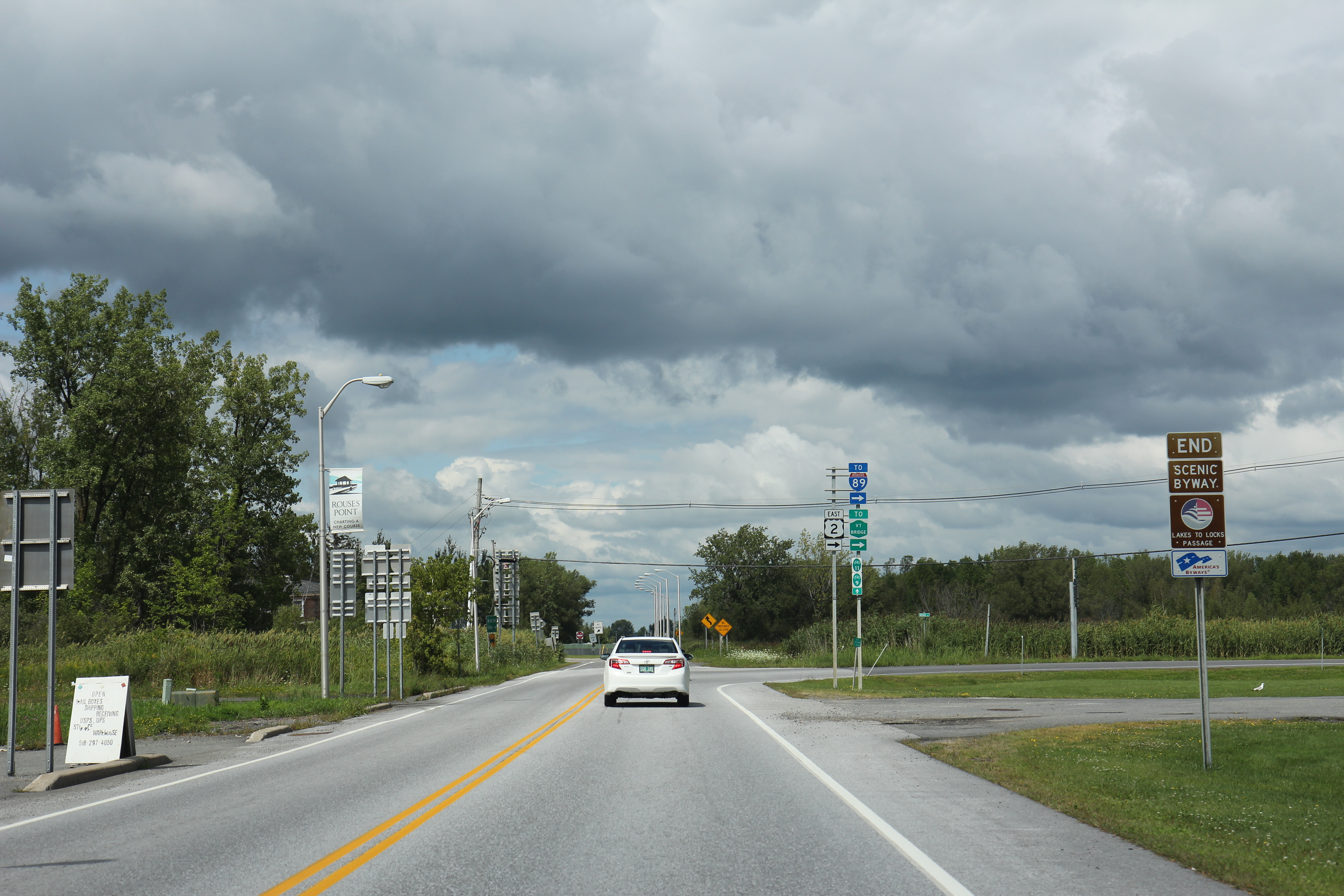
Northern terminus in the United States

The Lakes to Locks Passage extends from the junction of U.S. Route 4 (US 4) and New York State Route 32 (NY 32) in Waterford, New York, to the intersection of U.S. Route 11 (US 11) and New York State Route 9B (NY 9B) in Rouses Point, New York. The route includes both highway and waterway sections. The waterway route continues into Canada and connects with the St. Lawrence River.

The route includes the following segments:

- US 4 from Waterford to Whitehall
- NY 22 from Whitehall to Keeseville
- US 9 from Keeseville to Chazy
- NY 9B from Chazy to Rouses Point

The Lakes to Locks Passage also includes scenic lakeside roads on Point Au Roche and Cumberland Head, which are noted as "Scenic Byways."

A border crossing between Rouses Point, New York, and Lacolle, Quebec, is managed by U.S. Customs and Border Protection and Canada Border Services Agency, facilitating travel between the Lakes to Locks Passage and the Route du Richelieu in Canada.

In Quebec, the Route du Richelieu extends from Lacolle, turning east along Route 202. It branches along both banks of the Richelieu River, reaching its terminus at Sorel-Tracy. The Route du Richelieu has two main branches:

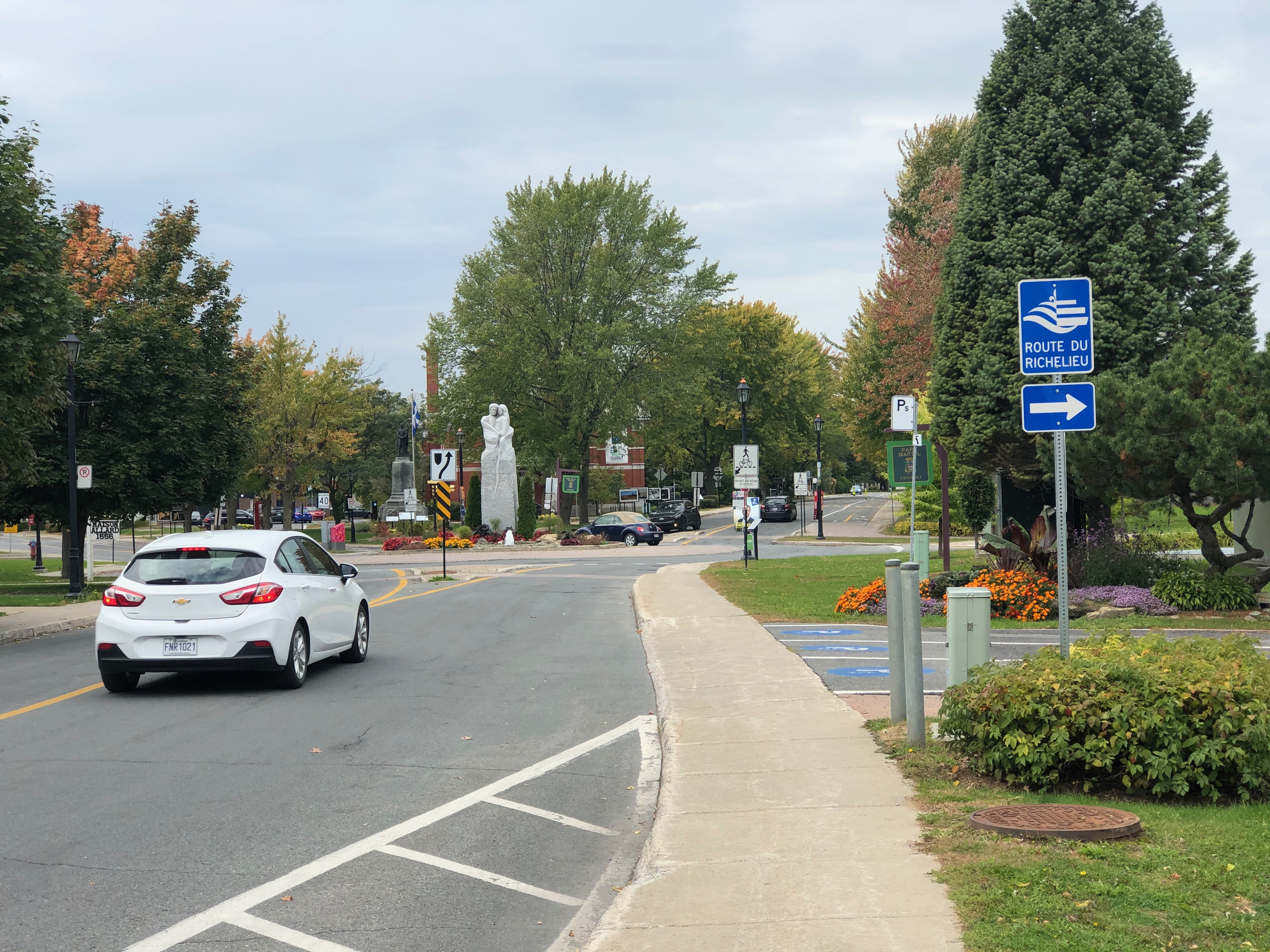
Roundabout in front of Chambly Town Hall, along the Route du Richelieu

- The western branch follows the west bank of the Richelieu River through communities such as Saint-Jean-sur-Richelieu, Carignan, Chambly, and Beloeil, primarily using Route 223, with detours through historical centers.
- The eastern branch crosses the Jean-Jacques-Bertrand Bridge and follows Routes 225 and 133, passing through Henryville, Sainte-Anne-de-Sabrevois, Saint-Jean-sur-Richelieu, and other towns, aligning with the chemin des Patriotes.

Bridges over the Richelieu River in Saint-Jean-sur-Richelieu, Chambly, and Beloeil connect the two branches. The branches converge at the northern terminus at the Sorel-Tracy Heritage Interpretation Centre on the Saint Lawrence River.

=== Waterway ===
The waterway route extends from the Erie Canal at Cohoes, New York, approximately 9 miles north of Albany and 1 mile southwest of Waterford, to the St. Lawrence River at Sorel-Tracy, Quebec, about 40 miles northeast of Montreal. This waterway constitutes one of North America's earliest interconnected water systems, playing a significant role in the historical development of the United States and Canada. It connects various historic, natural, cultural, and recreational sites along its route, including:

- Champlain Canal: Extends from Cohoes to Whitehall, featuring 11 locks (numbered 1 to 12, with no lock 10).
- Lake Champlain and Richelieu River: From Whitehall, New York, to Saint-Jean-sur-Richelieu, Quebec.
- Chambly Canal: Provides a bypass for rapids on the Richelieu River, extending from Saint-Jean-sur-Richelieu to Chambly, Quebec, with 9 locks.
- Richelieu River: From Chambly to Sorel-Tracy.

== Notable attractions ==
=== Quebec along Route du Richelieu ===
- Fort Chambly, Chambly: A historic fortification and national historic site in Quebec. The site provides insight into the military history of the region and is managed by Parks Canada. More information.
- Honoré Mercier Museum, Sainte-Anne-de-Sabrevois: A museum dedicated to the life and legacy of Honoré Mercier, a prominent Quebec political figure.
- Fort Lennox, Saint-Paul-de-l'île-aux-noix: A historical fort on an island in the Richelieu River, recognized for its military history.
- Chambly Canal: A historic canal located between Chambly and Saint-Jean-sur-Richelieu. The canal is a national historic site managed by Parks Canada and represents an important part of Quebec’s transportation history. More information.
- Maison des Gouverneurs, Sorel-Tracy: A historical building that serves as a museum, providing insight into the local history of the region.
- Gault Nature Reserve, Mont Saint-Hilaire: A nature reserve located on Mont Saint-Hilaire, known for its diverse ecosystems and hiking trails.

=== New York State along Lakes to Locks Passage ===
- Fort Ticonderoga: A historic fortress located in Ticonderoga, New York, known for its role in the American Revolutionary War. The site features restored fortifications and exhibits on military history.
- North Star Underground Railroad Museum: A museum located in Ausable Forks, New York, dedicated to the history of the Underground Railroad and its role in the abolitionist movement.
- Ausable Chasm: A natural geological formation in the Adirondack Mountains of New York, featuring a deep, scenic gorge carved by the Ausable River. The site is known for its scenic trails and outdoor activities.

== History ==
In 1992, the State of New York designated the Champlain Trail as a New York State Scenic Byway, recognizing its significance in providing access to the scenic, historic, cultural, natural, and recreational resources of Lake Champlain and its surrounding communities. In January 2000, local communities in Clinton, Essex, and Washington counties completed a Corridor Management Plan (CMP) for the Champlain Trail. This CMP was part of a broader initiative for Lake Champlain Byways, which involved collaboration with communities in Vermont. Similarly, communities along the Champlain Canal in New York completed a CMP for the Champlain Canal Byway in early 2000. In May 2000, the New York State Scenic Byways Advisory Board (NYSSBAB) adopted these plans and recommended merging the Champlain Canal Byway and the Champlain Trail into a single management organization.

In 2002, the Lakes to Locks Passage was designated as an All-American Road by the United States Department of Transportation. This designation acknowledges the byway's historical and recreational significance. As an All-American Road, it is promoted by the Federal Highway Administration as a notable destination.

The byway is managed by Lakes to Locks Passage, Inc., a non-profit organization focused on the preservation and promotion of the natural, cultural, recreational, and historical resources along the upper Hudson River, Champlain Canal, Lake George, and Lake Champlain.

At the 2005 Quebec-New York Economic Summit, Lakes to Locks Passage Inc. and the Regional Conference of Elected Officers (CRÉ) of the Montérégie-Est region signed a memorandum of understanding to collaboratively promote the region and develop travel routes within the Quebec-New York Corridor.

In Quebec, discussions about a tourist route along the Richelieu River began in the mid-1990s. The Route du Richelieu was announced by the CRÉ in March 2010 after receiving approval from the Quebec Ministry of Tourism in 2009. The route was officially inaugurated by CRÉ and Tourisme Montérégie in July 2012.

== See also ==
- Lake Champlain Seaway, a proposed large canal that would have traveled the route of the passage
