= Turboliner =

Family of gas turbine trainsets built for Amtrak in the 1970s

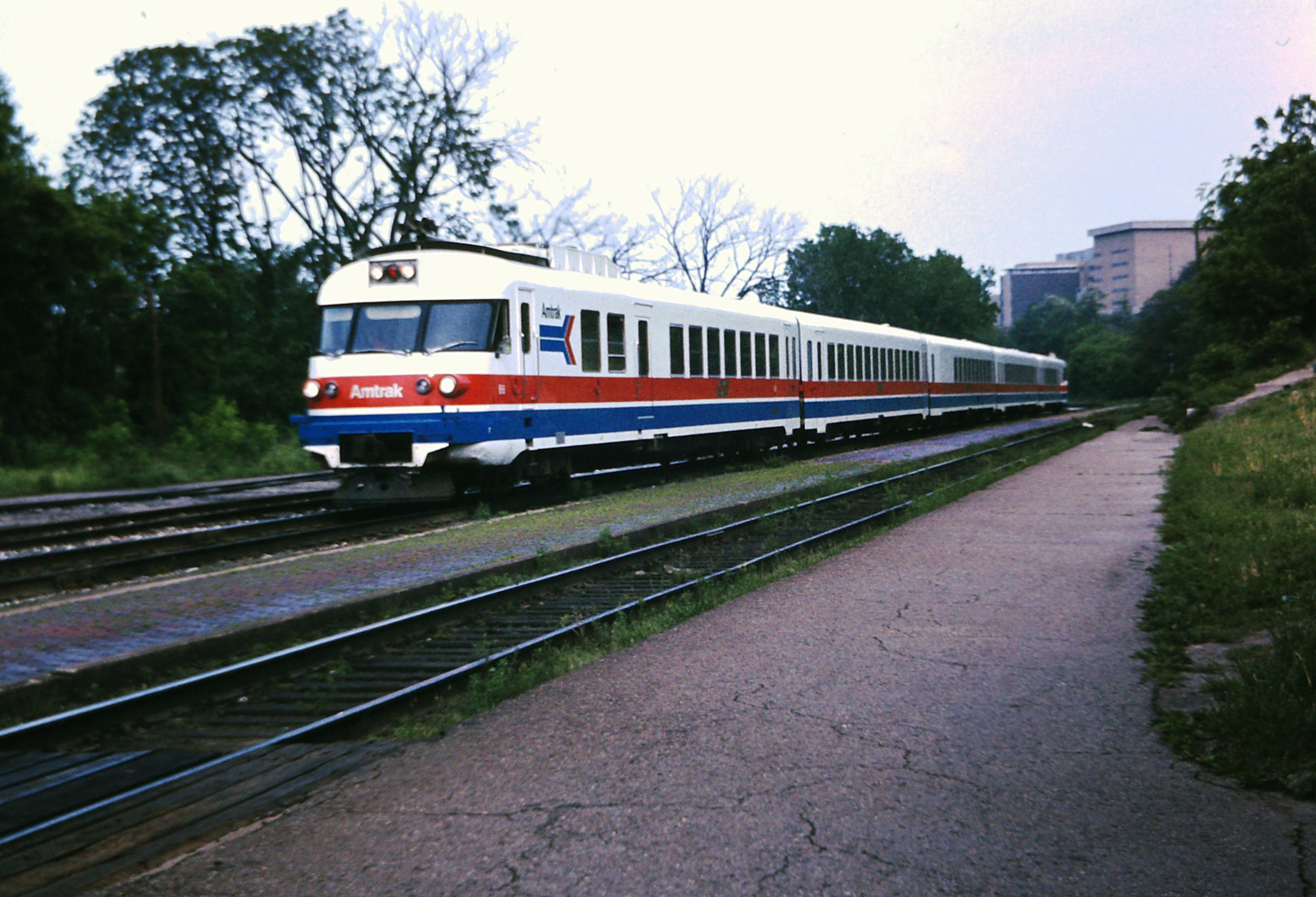
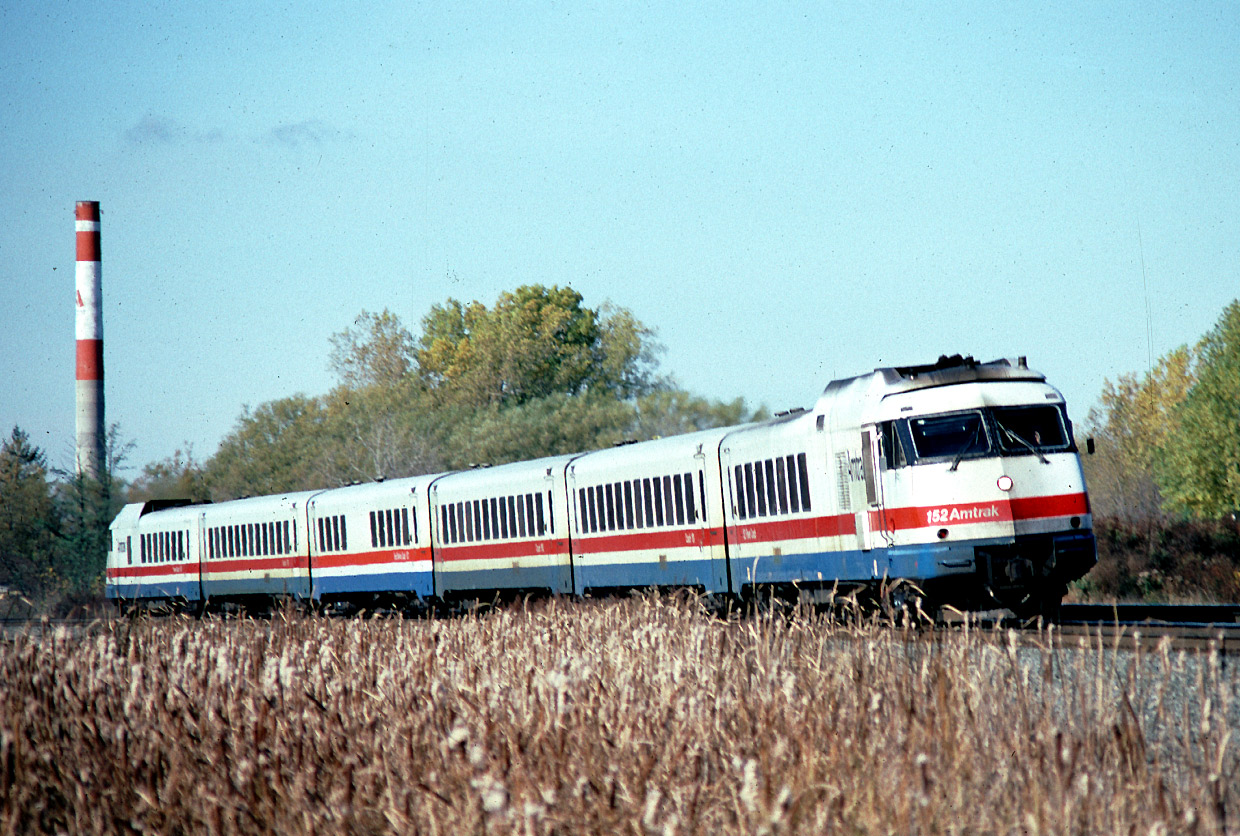
Amtrak's RTG (above) and RTL (below) Turboliner trainsets.

The Turboliners were a family of gas turbine trainsets built for Amtrak in the 1970s. They were among the first new equipment purchased by Amtrak to update its fleet with faster, more modern trains. The first batch, known as RTG, were built by the French firm ANF and entered service on multiple routes in the Midwestern United States in 1973. The new trains led to ridership increases wherever used, but the fixed consist (set collection of rail vehicles) that made up a Turboliner train proved a detriment as demand outstripped supply. The high cost of operating the trains led to their withdrawal from the Midwest in 1981.

The second batch, known as RTL, were of a similar design but manufactured by Rohr Industries. These entered service on the Empire Corridor in the state of New York in 1976. The RTLs remained in service there through the 1990s, supplemented by several rebuilt RTGs. In the late 1990s and early 2000s, New York and Amtrak partnered to rebuild the RTLs for high-speed service; this project failed, and the last RTL trainsets left revenue service in 2003. After the settlement of legal issues, New York sold the remaining trainsets for scrap in 2012.

== Background ==
Amtrak assumed control of almost all private sector intercity passenger rail service in the United States on May 1, 1971, with a mandate to reverse decades of decline. Amtrak retained approximately 184 of the 440 trains which had run the day before. To operate these trains, Amtrak inherited a fleet of 300 locomotives (electric and diesel) and 1,190 passenger cars, most of which dated from the 1940s–1950s.

Amtrak acquired the Turboliners with multiple goals in mind. The Turboliners were expected to cost less to operate than a comparable diesel locomotive with conventional cars while having a higher operating speed, though this would be constrained by track conditions. Amtrak also hoped that introducing new equipment would generate favorable publicity. Two years into its existence, Amtrak was fighting the perception that it was making "cosmetic changes to hand-me-down equipment". New gas turbine trainsets could change that perception.

The late 1960s and early 1970s saw several countries experimenting with gas turbine trains. The UAC TurboTrain had been in revenue service in the United States and Canada since 1968, with mixed results. British Rail began testing the APT-E in 1972; for a variety of reasons, British Rail did not pursue gas turbine propulsion.

== RTG ==
RTG Turboliner
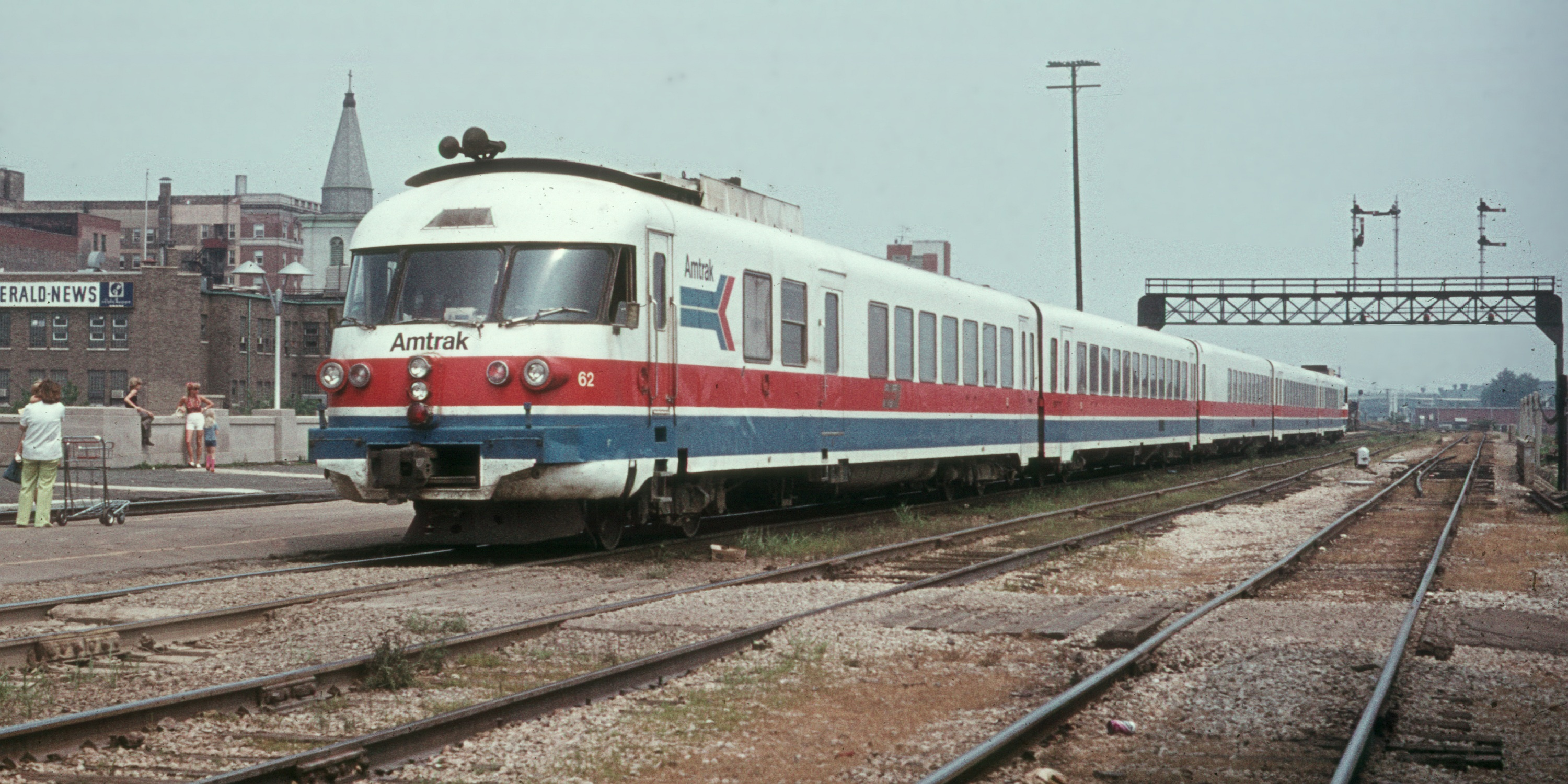
- An RTG Turboliner at Joliet Union Station in Joliet, Illinois, on July 3, 1975

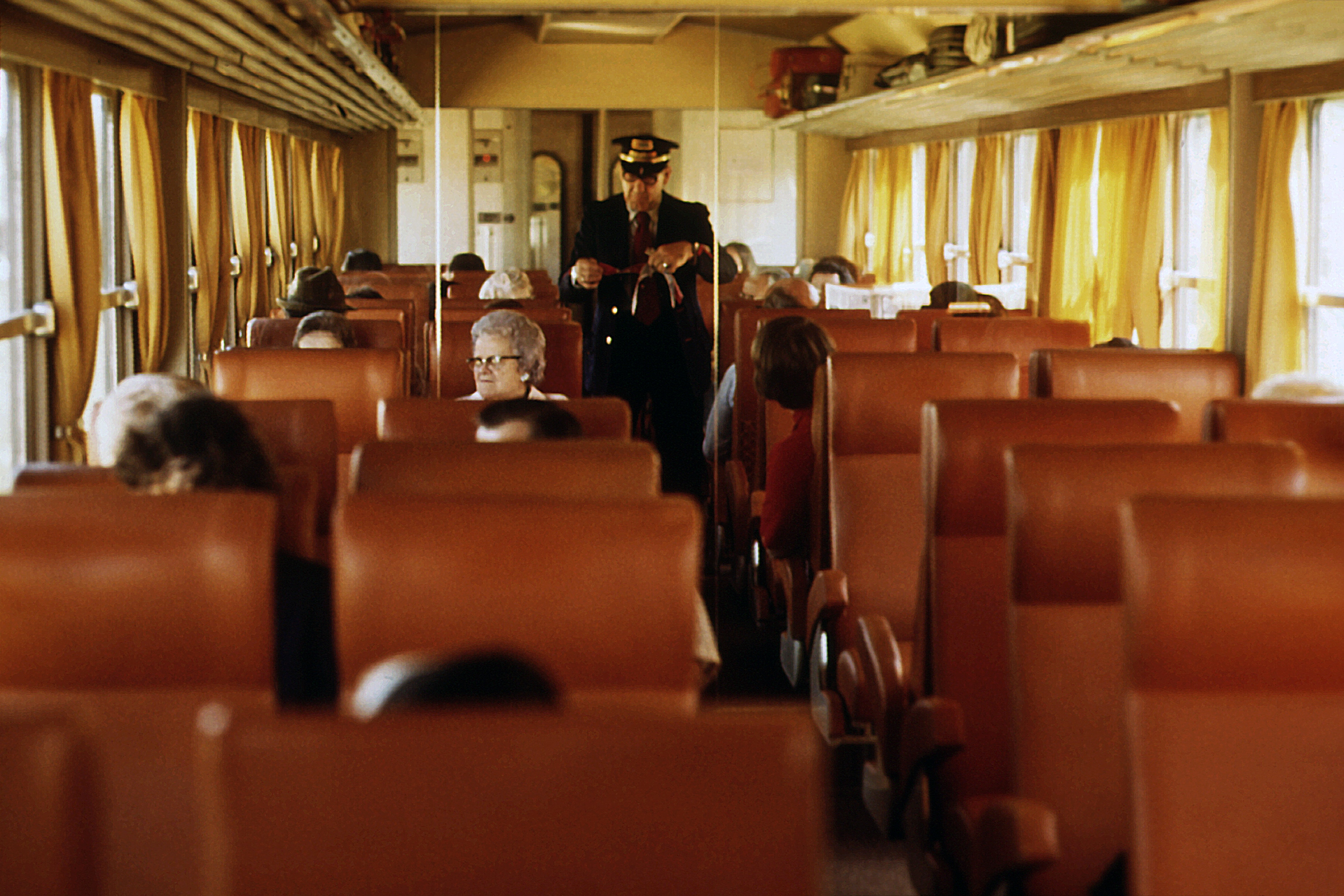
- A conductor collects tickets aboard a Midwestern Turboliner in 1974.
- In service: 1973–1994
- Manufacturer: ANF
- Constructed: 1973–1975
- Number built: 6 trainsets
- Number preserved: 0
- Number scrapped: 6
- Formation: Five cars
- Fleet numbers: 58–69
- Capacity: 296 passengers
- Operator: Amtrak

Specifications
- Car length: 86 ft 1 in (26.24 m)
- Width: 9 ft 5 1/2 in (2,883 mm)
- Maximum speed: 125 mph (201.2 km/h)
- Engine type: Turboshaft
- Power output: 2,280 hp (1,700.2 kW) (RTG); 3,000 hp (2,237.1 kW) (RTG-II)
- AAR wheel arrangement: B-2 (Note: Pertains to one power car.)
- Bogies: Creusot-Loire
- Track gauge: 4 ft 8 1/2 in (1,435 mm) standard gauge

=== Design ===
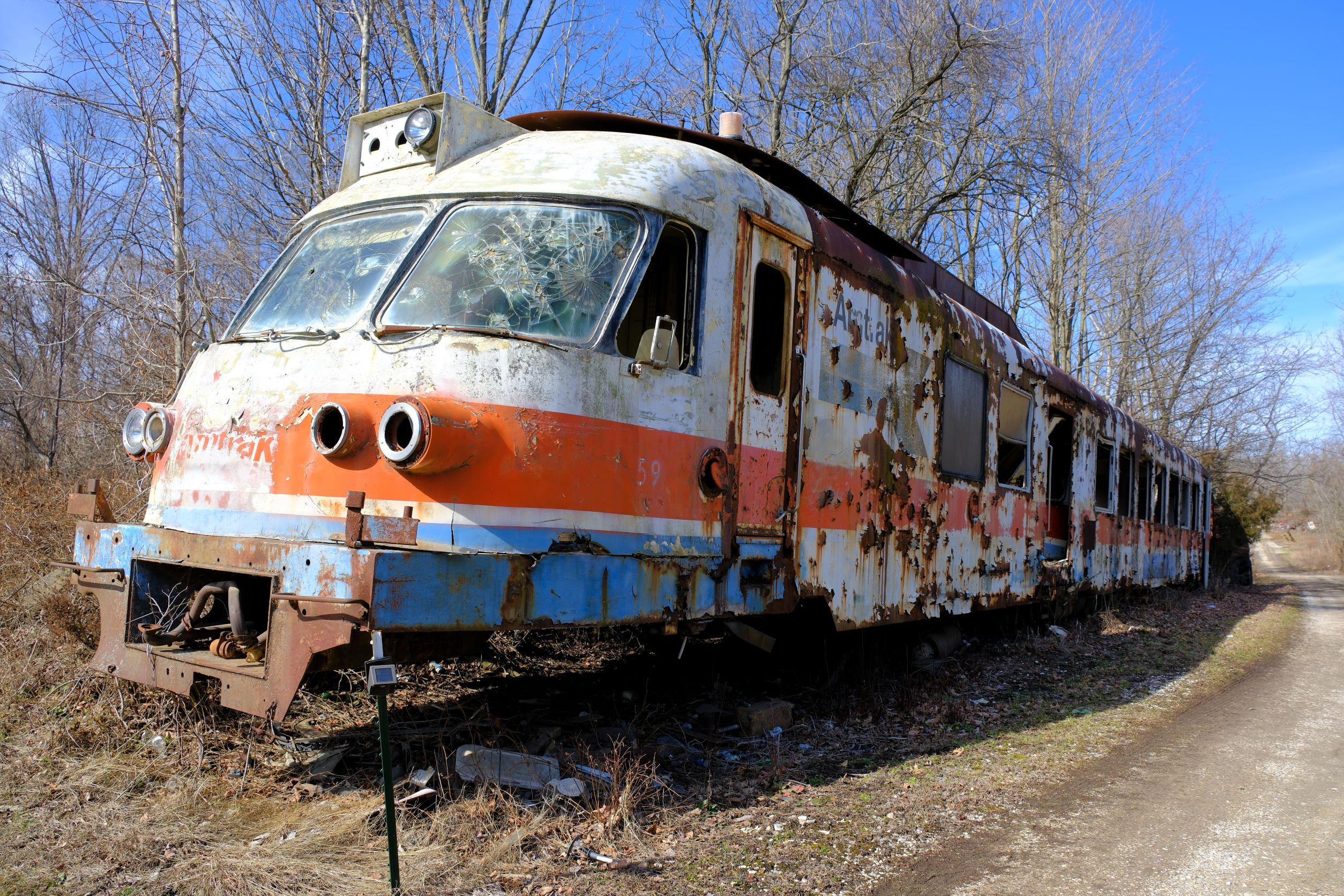
One RTG power car survived in a derelict state on private property outside Dugger, Indiana until it was scrapped in the mid-2020s.

The RTG (abbreviated from the French Rame à Turbine à Gaz, or gas turbine train) model was an Americanized version of the French ANF's T 2000 RTG Turbotrain (related to the prototype precursor to the very first TGV trainset, the TGV 001). The RTGs used European-style couplers (buffers and turnbuckles) between their cars, because they were built in France by ANF for SNCF. Another change was the installation of top-mounted Nathan P1234A5 horns, a variation of the standard Nathan P5. Amtrak obtained a permanent waiver from the Federal Railroad Administration which exempted the RTGs from the buff strength requirement of 800,000 pounds-force (3,600 kN). The RTGs met a lower standard set by the International Union of Railways.

Each trainset consisted of two power cars (which included seating), two coaches and a bar/grill. The trains were powered by a pair of 1,140 horsepower (850 kW) Turbomeca Turmo III turbines. The cars rode on Creusot-Loire trucks. The bar/grill, located at the center of the trainset, had table seating for 24. The vestibules between the cars were partitioned by sliding doors: one at each end of the car, and a double set between the cars themselves. A passenger moving between cars thus had to pull open three sets of doors. The trains were not intended for use with high-level platforms, and there were no traps covering the steps down to platform level. A five-car trainset could be configured with up to 44 coach seats in the end power cars, 80 coach seats in the middle coaches and to up 60 seats in the snack bar for a maximum of 308 passengers.

Between 1985 and 1988, three RTG trainsets (numbered 64 to 69) were rebuilt at the Beech Grove Shops for the Empire Corridor in New York. Each trainset received an RTL-style nose and third rail capability for operation into Grand Central Terminal. A new 3,000 horsepower (2,200 kW) Turbomeca engine replaced the original. The rebuilt units were designated RTG-II.

=== Service ===
Amtrak leased two RTG trainsets from ANF for 18 months in August 1973, at $85,000 per month with an option to purchase. These were based out of Chicago, and initially served the Chicago–St Louis corridor. Amtrak heralded the Turboliners as the "biggest travel news since the 747". David P. Morgan, editor-in-chief of Trains magazine, was aboard for the initial run from Chicago to St Louis on September 28, 1973, and came away with mixed impressions. He praised the large picture windows, comparing them favorably with the "rifle-slot-size" windows on the Budd Metroliner, but faulted the narrow aisles, difficult-to-navigate vestibules, and seat comfort. He found that the trains "[rode] reasonably well", even on rough track.

Advantages over conventional diesel equipment included increased availability, higher speed through curves, and decreased weight which caused less wear on the tracks. Impressed with their reliability, Amtrak purchased the trainsets outright and ordered another four trainsets, which entered service in 1975 on the Chicago–Milwaukee and Chicago–Detroit corridors. The purchase price for the six trainsets was $18 million. Amtrak contemplated ordering an additional 14 trainsets for the partially electrified Northeast Corridor between Boston and New York City. Doing so would have required a significant rise in fares between the two cities, and the United States Department of Transportation blocked the proposal.

Amtrak established a separate maintenance facility for all six trainsets in the Brighton Park neighborhood of Chicago, on the site of a former Gulf, Mobile & Ohio Railroad coach yard. This facility closed in 1981 after the withdrawal of the RTGs from service; according to Amtrak, the trainsets were too expensive to operate compared to conventional equipment. The trainsets were mothballed at Amtrak's main maintenance facility in Beech Grove, Indiana. A contributing factor to the withdrawal was the spike in fuel prices after the Yom Kippur War.

The three rebuilt RTG-II trainsets joined the RTL trainsets on the Empire Corridor in 1988. Insufficient maintenance in the early 1990s reduced reliability and led to several fires in 1993–1994. Amtrak retired the RTG-IIs after one caught fire in Pennsylvania Station in New York on September 11, 1994.

==== St Louis ====
The two daily round-trips were branded Turboliner, replacing the individual names Abraham Lincoln and Prairie State. Amtrak repeated this experiment with the Detroit and Milwaukee corridors. Track conditions limited the new trainsets to 79 mph (127 km/h), but they were clean, comfortable, quiet and reliable. In the first year, the Chicago–St. Louis running time dropped from 5.5 to 5 hours. The Federal Railroad Administration refused a request from Amtrak to raise the speed limit to 90 mph (140 km/h), citing inadequate signalling along the route. The new trains had fallen out of favor by the end of 1974: food service was inadequate, and the five-car fixed consist could not handle demand. Amfleet coaches and new conventional diesels replaced both of the Turboliner trainsets in 1975.

==== Detroit ====
Turboliners arrived on the Detroit run on April 10, 1975. Additional equipment allowed Amtrak to add a round-trip in late April; the arrival of a third trainset in May made Chicago–Detroit the "first all-turbine-powered route". After one year of operation, ridership on the corridor had increased by 72 percent. The fixed capacity of 292 passengers on an RTL trainset proved an impediment; Amtrak could not add capacity when demand outstripped supply. Amtrak replaced one of the trainsets with a conventional locomotive hauling then-new Amfleet coaches in 1976; Turboliner service ended altogether by 1981 as more Amfleet equipment became available.

==== Milwaukee ====
Turboliners debuted on the Hiawatha corridor on June 1, 1975, and more trainsets began operating in 1976. As with the St. Louis and Detroit corridors, Amtrak dropped individual names in favor of the Turboliner branding in 1976, but reinstated these names in 1980. Turboliner equipment was withdrawn altogether in 1981. Their withdrawal was the end of Turboliner service in the Midwest.

== RTL ==
RTL Turboliner
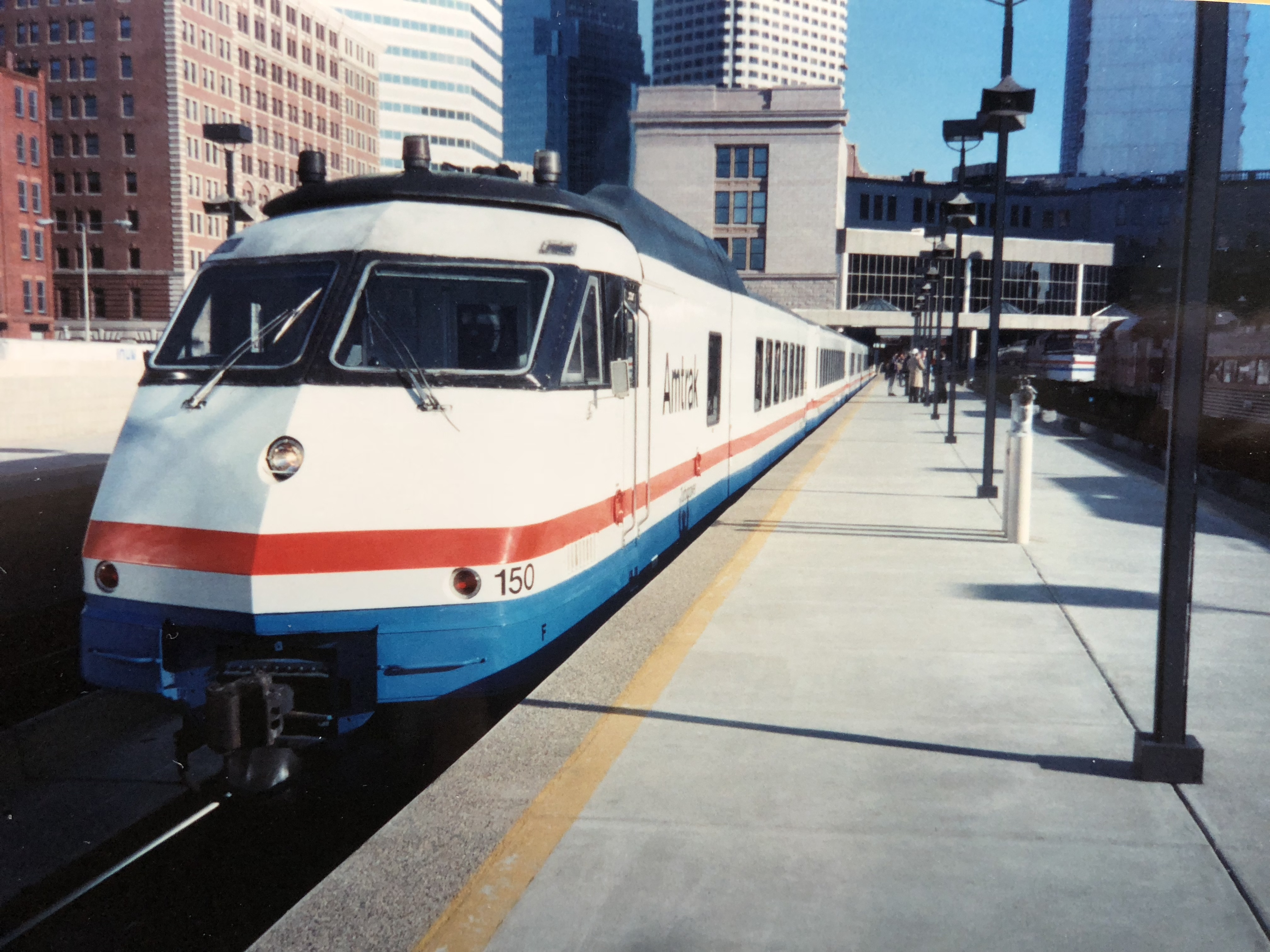
- An RTL Turboliner stopped at Boston South Station in October 1988

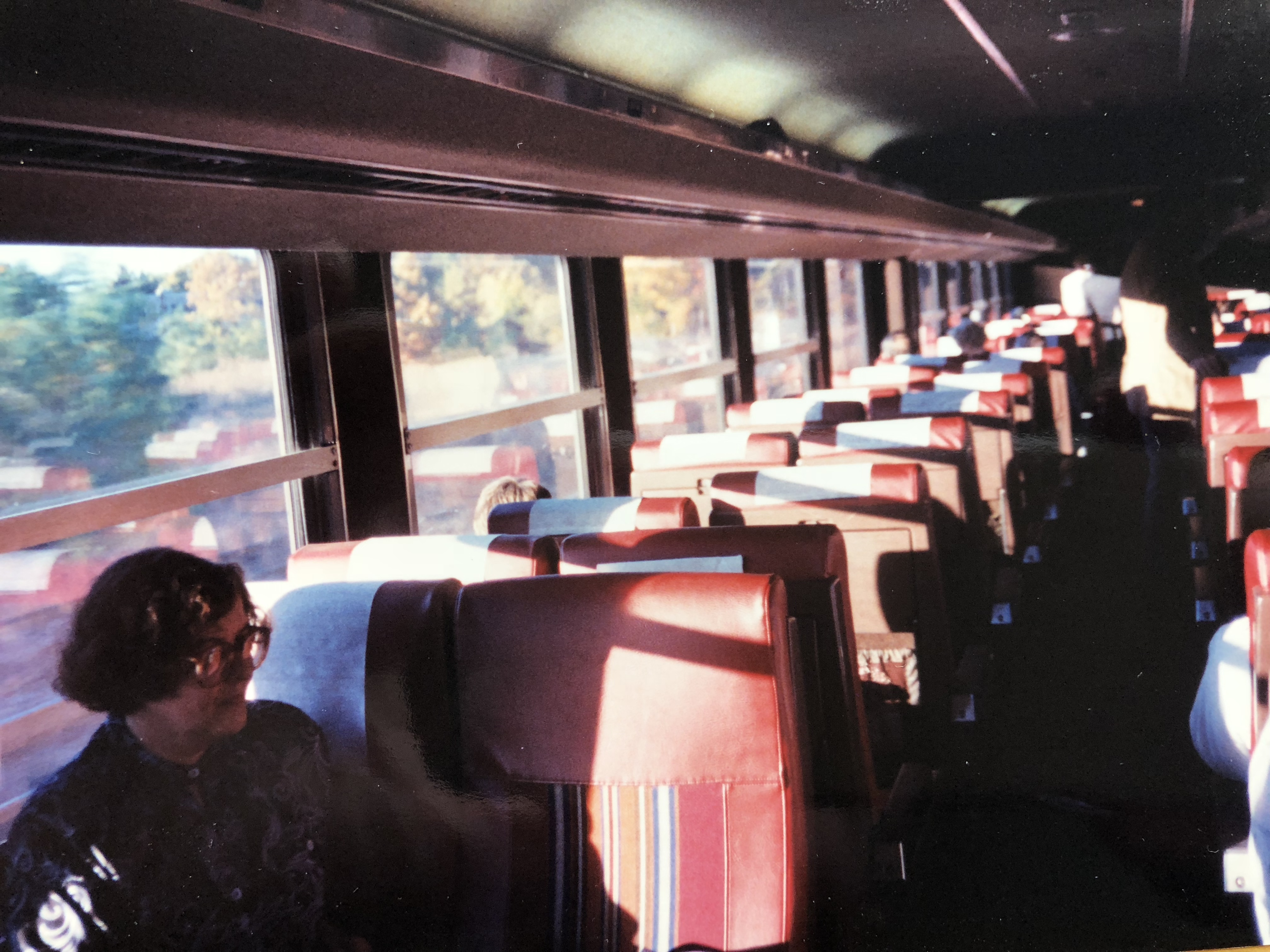
- Interior on an RTL train in 1988
- In service: 1976–2003
- Manufacturer: Rohr Industries
- Constructed: 1976
- Refurbished: 2003
- Number built: 7 trainsets
- Number preserved: 3 (in storage - derelict condition)
- Number scrapped: 4
- Formation: Five cars
- Fleet numbers: 2150–2163 (formerly 150–163)
- Capacity: 264 passengers
- Operator: Amtrak
- Line served: Empire Corridor

Specifications
- Train length: 425 feet (130 m)
- Width: 10 ft (3.05 m)
- Maximum speed: 125 mph (201 km/h)
- Weight: 308 short tons (275 long tons; 279 t)
- Engine type: Turboshaft
- Power output: 2,280 horsepower (1,700 kW)
- Acceleration: 1 mile per hour per second (1.6 km/(h⋅s))
- Electric systems: 600 V DC third rail (into Grand Central Terminal or Pennsylvania Station)
- Current collection: Contact shoe
- AAR wheel arrangement: B-2
- Track gauge: 4 ft 8 1/2 in (1,435 mm) standard gauge

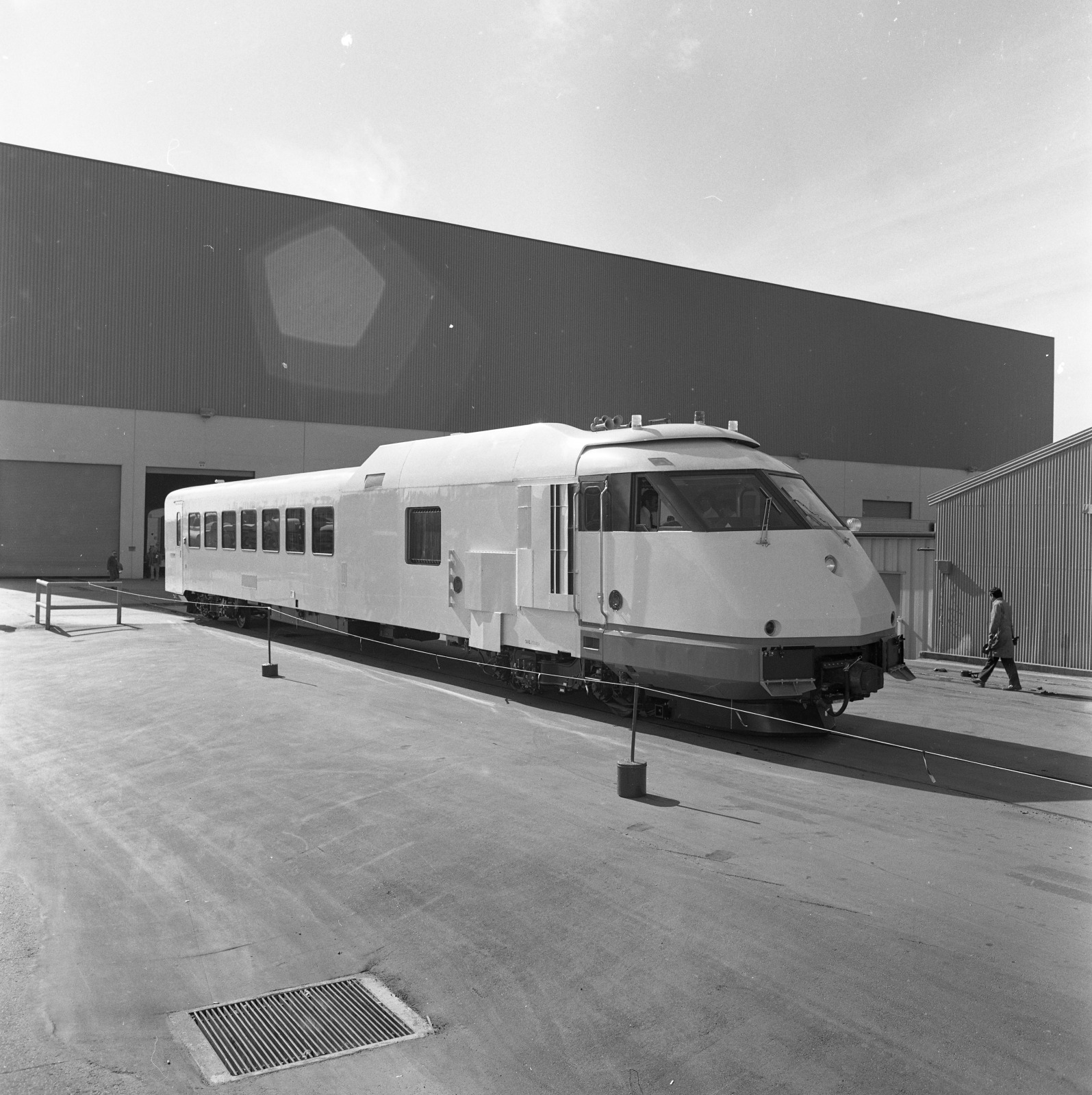
An RTL Turboliner motor car on display outside of the Rohr factory in Chula Vista, California

Amtrak ordered another seven Turboliner trainsets, which were delivered between 1976 and 1977. These were manufactured by Rohr Industries in Chula Vista, California, and were known as RTL Turboliners. They were based on the earlier RTG series, but had American-style Janney couplers throughout and a different design of power car cab. The standard configuration of each set was five cars: power cars at either end (27 parlor seats and 40 coach seats respectively), a food service car (52 coach seats), and two coaches (72 seats each). In that configuration, each trainset could carry 264 passengers. At times, Amtrak operated Turboliners with an additional coach cut into the consist. These were the final gas turbine trainsets purchased by Amtrak; conventional diesel locomotive-hauled trains proved cheaper to operate.

The RTL Turboliners were wider than the RTG Turboliners (10 feet or 3.05 meters versus 9 feet 5 1/2 inches or 2.88 meters) to accommodate more seating. The floor height was raised for use on the high-level platforms of the Northeast Corridor. Although the RTGs continued to operate under a waiver from the regulation, the RTLs were built to meet the Federal Railroad Administration's buff strength requirement of 800,000 pounds (362,873.9 kg).

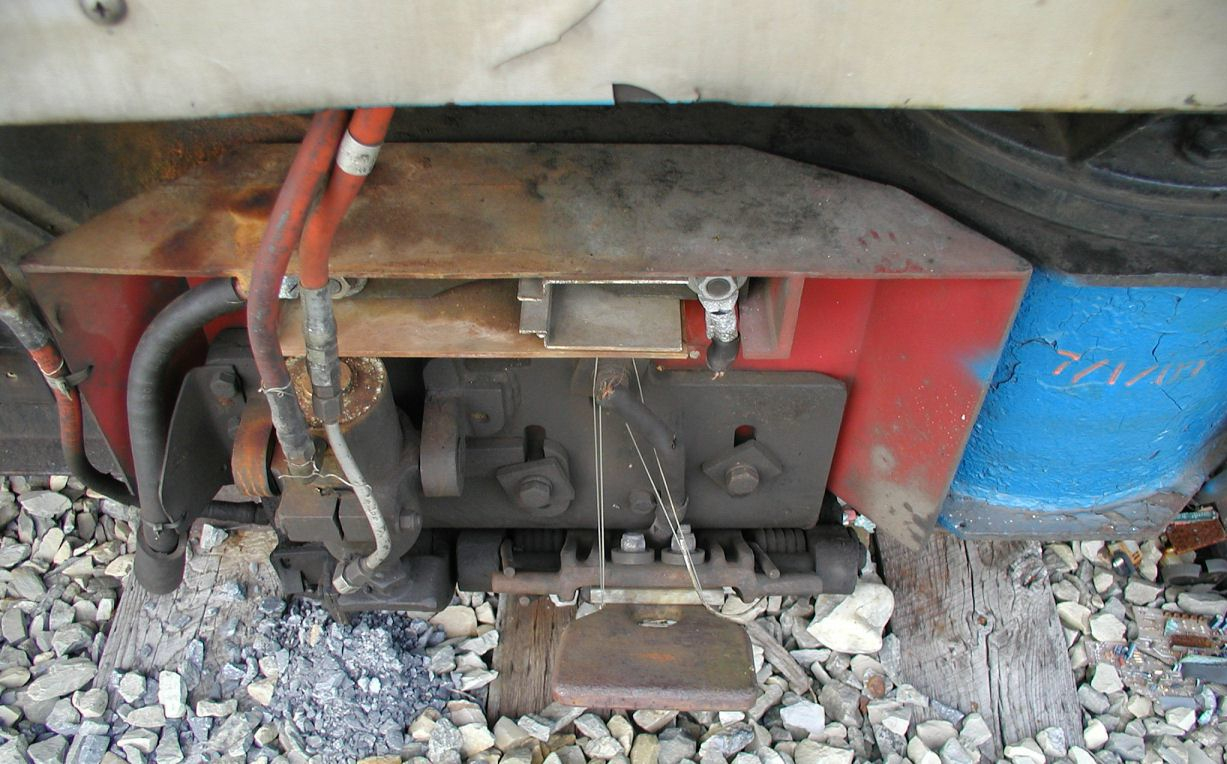
Third rail shoe installed on the front truck of an RTL-II car for operation into New York Penn Station.

The RTL Turboliners were capable of third rail operation, allowing them to enter Grand Central Terminal and, later, Pennsylvania Station in New York City. Under third rail operation the trains were limited to 45 miles per hour (72.4 km/h). As it had with the earlier RTGs in the Midwest, Amtrak set up a separate maintenance facility in Rensselaer, New York. This facility opened on November 30, 1977, and cost $15 million. As built, the RTLs carried 2,560 US gallons (9,700 L; 2,130 imp gal) of fuel, permitting an operational range of 950 miles (1,530 km). The seven trainsets cost $32 million.

The official inaugural run of the RTLs took place on September 18–19, 1976. Regular service on the Empire Corridor began on September 20. Initially, the two trainsets were mostly confined to the New York–Albany shuttle, with a single round-trip each on Saturday and Sunday to Buffalo. The New York–Montreal Adirondack received Turboliners on March 1, 1977, replacing conventional equipment. By April 1977, Turboliners had displaced conventional equipment on most routes in upstate New York. Exceptions included some New York–Albany trains, as well as the long-distance Lake Shore Limited and Niagara Rainbow. In 1989, after 12 years of operation, the availability of the fleet was at 90%.

=== RTL-II ===
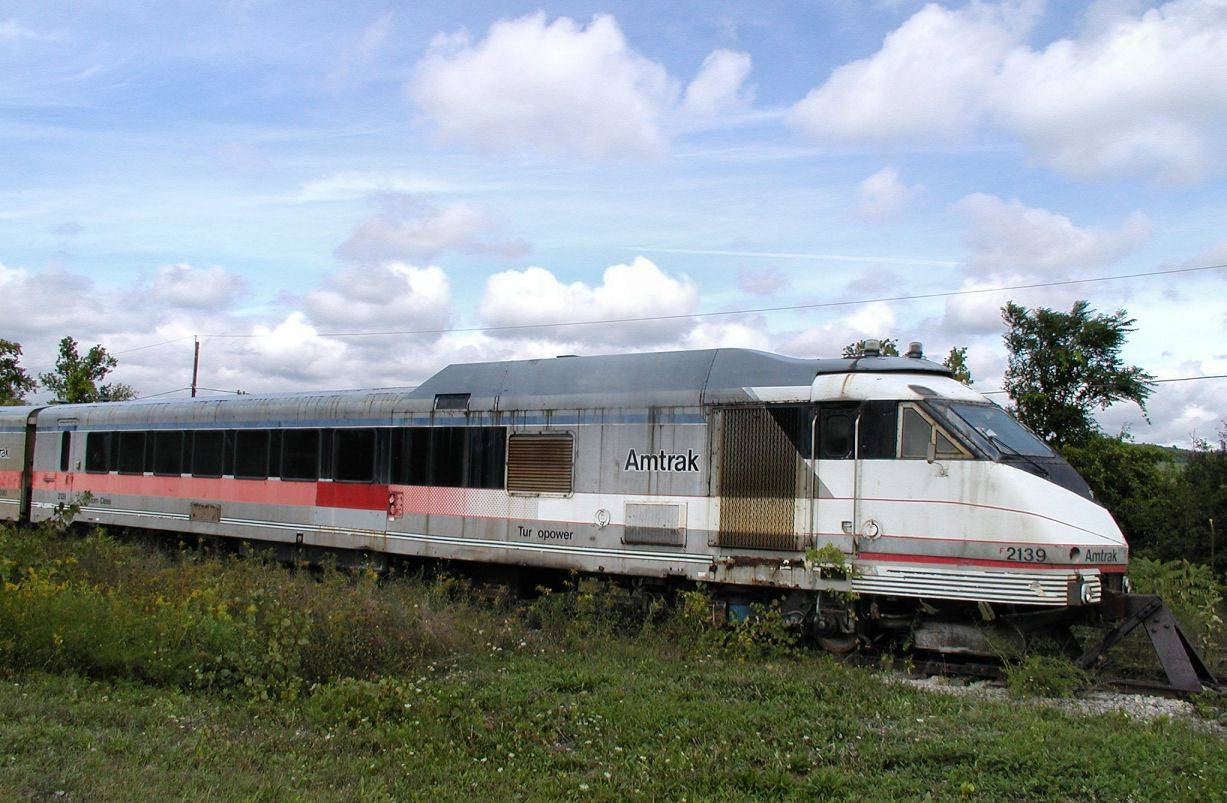
RTL Turboliner No. 2139 in storage in 2006.

In 1995, Amtrak and the State of New York collaborated to rebuild a single RTL trainset at a cost of $2 million. This rebuild included a pair of new Turbomeca Makila T1 turbines, each capable of developing 1,600 horsepower (1,200 kW). The interiors were to be renovated, and the exterior paint scheme changed. Morrison-Knudsen rebuilt the power cars, while Amtrak overhauled the coach interiors at Beech Grove. The rebuilt trainset was designated RTL-II. In test runs on the Empire and Northeast Corridors, it reached a top speed of 125 mph (201 km/h), all the while consuming less fuel than previously.

=== RTL-III ===
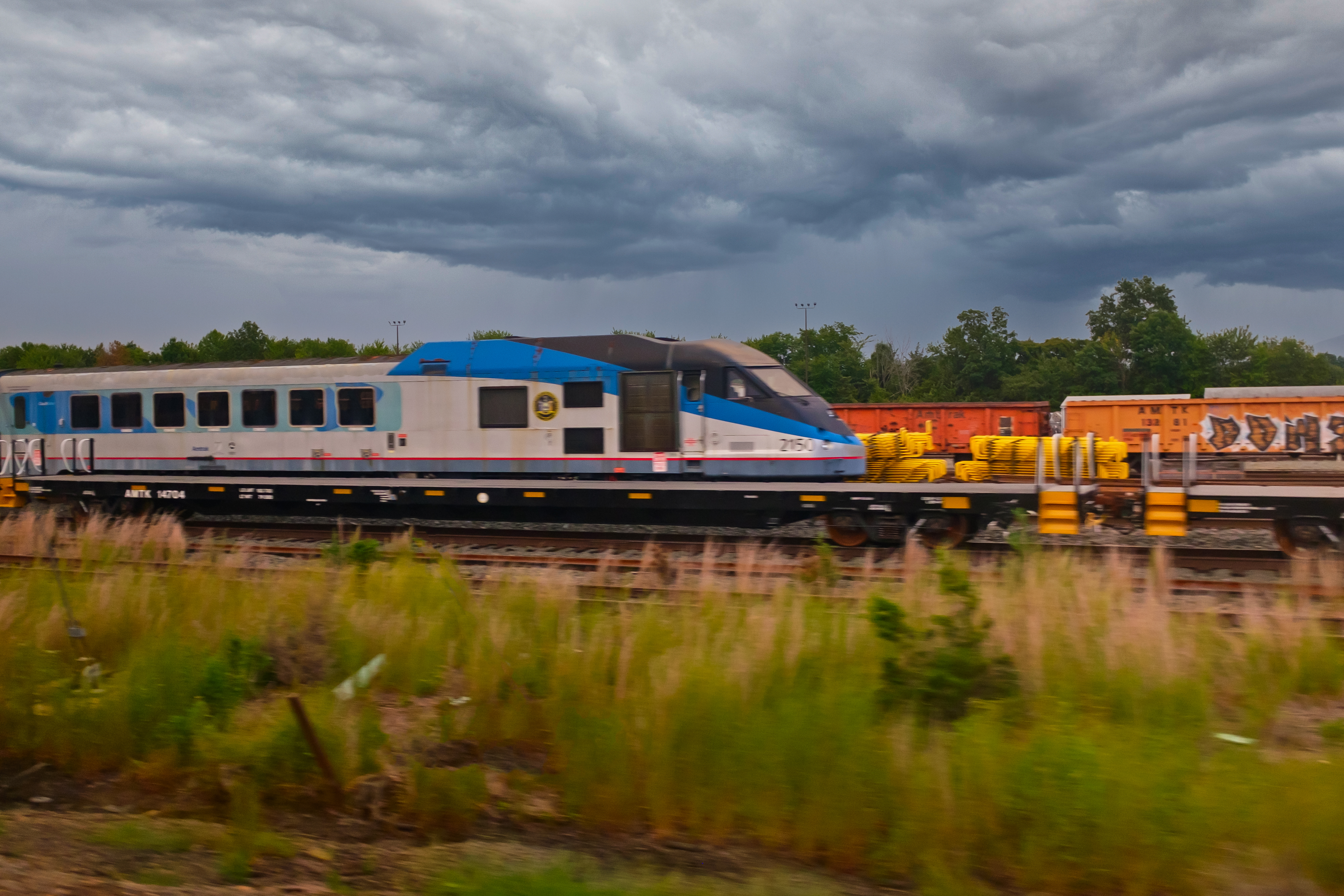
RTL Turboliner No. 2150 at Adams Yard in 2021.

In 1998, Amtrak and the State of New York began the High Speed Rail Improvement Program, a $185 million effort to improve service over the Empire Corridor. A key component was the reconstruction of all seven RTL Turboliner trainsets to the RTL-III specification. New York selected Super Steel Schenectady to perform the work, and the first two trainsets were to enter service in 1999. Numerous delays pushed the start of service to April 2003. Of the five additional trainsets, originally scheduled to enter service in 2002, only one was completed and it never entered revenue service. All seven trainsets were renumbered in 2001 to prevent duplicate numbers with the new GE P42DCs and were painted in new Acela-style livery. One of the rebuilt RTL-IIIs was tested on the night of February 15, 2001, reaching 125 mph (201 km/h).

The first rebuilt RTL-III entered service on April 14, 2003. The agreement between Amtrak and New York provided that New York would take ownership of the rebuilt trainsets once Amtrak had "fully accepted" them for regular revenue service. Amtrak withdrew all RTL-IIIs from service in June after problems developed with the air-conditioning systems. In 2004, New York sued Amtrak in federal court for $477 million, both for not operating the trainsets and for failing to complete track work in the Empire Corridor to permit regular 125-mile-per-hour (201 km/h) operation. Amtrak mothballed the equipment at its maintenance facility in Bear, Delaware. Joseph H. Boardman, then-Commissioner of the New York State Department of Transportation (and a future president of Amtrak), accused Amtrak of "stealing" the trains and threatened to find a new vendor for the state's intercity rail service. Conventional locomotives and Amfleet equipment replaced the trainsets in revenue service.

In April 2005, New York reached a settlement with Super Steel to close the rehabilitation project for $5.5 million, requiring them to stop work on the project, cover remaining costs, and move four unfinished trains into storage at a nearby industrial park. This settlement, when added to the $64.8 million previously spent, brought total project expenses—the results of which were three rehabilitated trainsets and four others in various states of repair—to $70.3 million. In 2007, Amtrak and New York settled their own lawsuit, with Amtrak paying New York $20 million. Amtrak and New York further agreed to commit $10 million each to implement track improvements in the Empire Corridor. New York, which was paying $150,000 per year to store the unused trains, auctioned off its four surplus Turboliners in 2012 for $420,000, including spare parts; scrapping began in 2013.

== See also ==
- Bombardier JetTrain
- Turbine-electric transmission
