= New York high-speed rail =

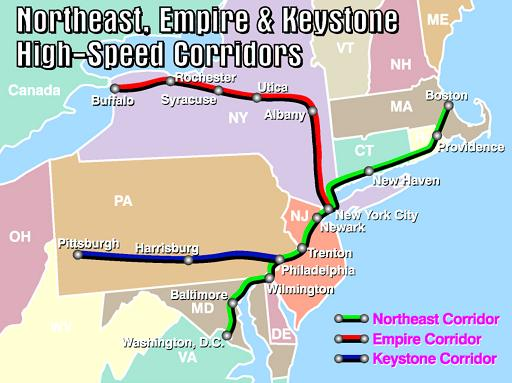
The Empire Corridor (red) and the Northeast Corridor (green), as designated by the Federal Railroad Administration, both run through New York

High-speed rail in the U.S. state of New York has been consistently discussed among legislators, political leaders and in particular, several past governors since the 1990s, but thus far little progress has been made. In his campaign speeches prior to his defeat by Governor George Pataki in 1994, Mario Cuomo promised to bring high speed (maglev) rail up the Hudson Valley and along the Catskill Mountains route. It was not a priority for the subsequent administration.

Currently, Amtrak's Acela service between Washington, D.C., and Boston, Massachusetts is available to New York City, but the cities in Upstate New York remain isolated from high-speed rail service. Further, destinations outside the New York metropolitan area have experienced delays in their service for decades. In some areas, New York State has been quietly endorsing and even implementing rail improvements for years.

Frequently cited as a partial solution for Upstate New York's economic stagnation, faster rail transportation between New York City and the rest of the state has been suggested as a way to make rural areas grow into suburban destinations for daily commuters, and easily accessible for businesses to relocate to cheaper real estate. Many politicians also endorse closer ties with destinations in Canada.

== History ==
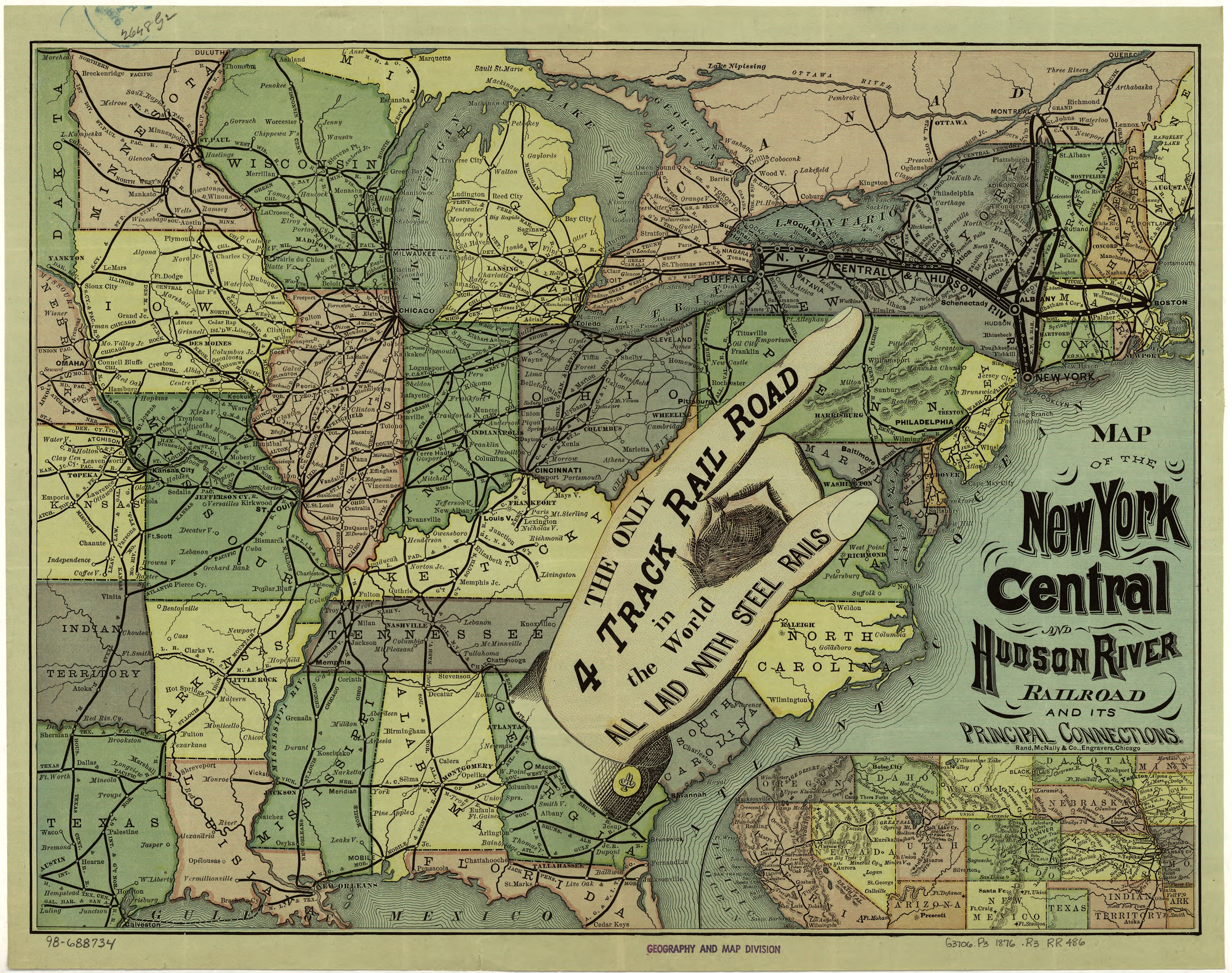
An 1876 NYCRR map of the four-track water-level route

Rail travel in New York has its roots in the early 19th century. The New York Central water-level route roughly followed the path of the Erie Canal, with four tracks along much of the route. For many years the 20th Century Limited and Empire State Express services, to Chicago and Buffalo were among the fastest trains in the world, with average speeds topping 60 mph (97 km/h) and top speeds reportedly well over 100 mph (160 km/h). Rail travel largely stagnated in the post-World War II economic boom, as the New York Thruway was built, and then the rest of the highway transportation and suburban lifestyles burgeoned. Nonetheless, rail culture lived on in the New York metropolitan area. It was kept alive by the subway culture in New York City, as well as suburban routes on Long Island and the northern suburbs of the city. The Long Island Rail Road and Metro-North Railroad are the two largest commuter railroads in the United States. New Jersey Transit, which serves New Jersey commuters to Manhattan, Philadelphia, and points within New Jersey, is also a major player in the U.S. commuter rail market. Potential also exists for a high-speed rail line to Montreal, Quebec, Canada along an existing train right-of-way.

Interest in updating the state's aging rail infrastructure was sparked in the early 1990s. In the early 1980s the State of New York paid Conrail to install cab signals from Poughkeepise to Hoffmans, west of Schenectady, to allow 110 mph train service. This service was implemented. In the late 1990s, ground was broken on a new rail station in Rensselaer, at the time reported as the ninth busiest station in the entire United States; federal funding was secured for the project. In 2001, the state tested a newly rebuilt Turboliner RTL-III gas turbine trainset capable of reaching 125 mph (201 km/h). In 2004, the Turboliner rehabilitation project had a falling out between Amtrak and New York State and the contractor doing the rehab. After lawsuits were filed, a settlement was reached to liquidate the unfinished Turboliner project. In the aftermath of the September 11, 2001, terrorist attacks, New York Governor George Pataki attempted to secure, among other things, a high-speed rail link to Schenectady using federal emergency aid money. From 2004 until 2012, the unused Turboliners sat in storage at a cost of $150,000 per year to the taxpayers until a decision by Governor Andrew Cuomo to liquidate the remaining fleet for scrap metal.

Notably, federal planners identified New York State's Empire Corridor (Buffalo-Albany-New York City) as one of the best-suited for high-speed rail service. In 2005, New York State Senate Majority Leader Joseph Bruno expressed renewed interest in high-speed rail and proposed research into high-speed rail development in New York State as part of a plan to boost Upstate New York's economy. In addition, the Empire Service Amtrak line between New York and Albany already has one of the highest levels of ridership outside the Northeast Corridor and Acela lines.

== American Recovery and Reinvestment Act of 2009 ==
In 2009, The New York State Department of Transportation released a statewide rail plan, including a program of capital investments to increase passenger rail speed and reliability. In October 2009, the state applied for funding for a number of these projects from the American Recovery and Reinvestment Act of 2009 High Speed Intercity Passenger Rail program. The NYSDOT also named a project manager for high speed rail, Marie Corrado.

New York governor-elect Andrew Cuomo sent a letter to U.S. Transportation Secretary Ray LaHood shortly after his victory in the 2010 New York gubernatorial election requesting that New York receive the money granted by the federal government to high-speed rail projects in Wisconsin and Ohio that the governors of both states pledged to cancel.

According to a study by America 2050, the corridor between New York City and Albany has high potential among 8,000 possible routes nationwide as a high-speed corridor.

=== Projects ===
The state received $151 million from the federal government in early 2010, of which $58 million was planned to be used to build an 11 miles (18 km) stretch of track between Riga and Byron capable of 110 miles per hour (180 km/h) speeds. This was planned to be an entirely new track parallel to the existing CSX line used solely for Amtrak trains. The remainder of the money was used to construct a second track between Albany and Schenectady. Negotiations between the state and CSX around the Western New York third track came to a halt in late spring of 2010 after CSX disclosed a requirement that the new track be located at least 30 feet (9.1 m) from its right-of-way; in some places along the route, that amount of space is unavailable. The two parties subsequently came to an agreement, however, after further meetings arranged by Representative Louise Slaughter, allowing planning for the trackage to continue. Between Albany and Schenectady, construction of the third track is planned to begin in 2011. An additional $354 million, composed of funds rejected by other states, was granted to New York in May 2011. Of that, $58 million will be allocated to the ongoing Albany-Schenectady upgrades, $1.4 million will be allocated for a preliminary study for a new terminal in Rochester, and the remainder will go to New York City.

Beginning in 2010, a study was conducted by the New York State Department of Transportation for the Tier 1 Environmental Impact Statement on high speed rail service from New York City to Niagara Falls. The Tier 1 Draft EIS was released to the public in early 2014 and eliminates the alternatives with tops speeds of 160 mph (257 km/h) and 220 mph (354 km/h) due to high costs. The five alternatives that remain under consideration include the base alternative with top speeds remaining at 79 mph (127 km/h) as well as higher speed rail with top speeds of 90 mph (145 km/h) (options A and B), 110 mph (177 km/h), and 125 mph (201 km/h). In 2023, the state chose the 90 mph (145 km/h) option B (90B) plan as its preferred alternative in the final Tier 1 EIS report. The 90B plan would require an estimated $6 billion (in 2017 US dollars) to implement.

== Issues in constructing high-speed rail lines in New York ==
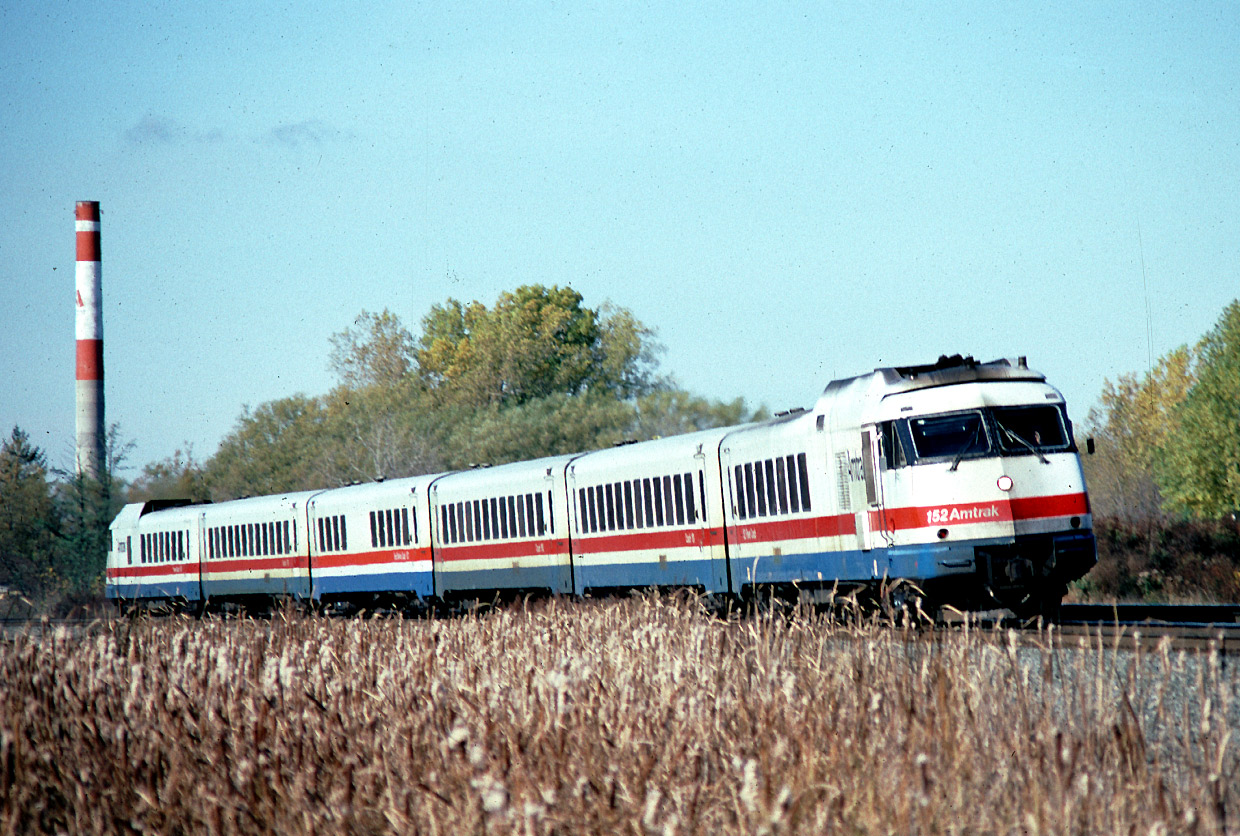
An RTL Turboliner in the 1980s.

The entire upstate network lacks electrification for conventional high-speed service. In the past, New York investigated gas turbine alternatives which would not require electrification, such as the JetTrain by Bombardier Transportation or the older Turboliner fleet, but neither project proved feasible.

Sections of the Hudson River route have tight curves. Some portions, notably the Spuyten Duyvil Bridge are operating with only a single track.

Most sections of the routes north and west of Albany share track with freight trains and extra tracks would be necessary to achieve high speed on the route; the federal government considers this to be "one of the largest projects" if upgrading.

== Proposals ==
Other proposals involve extensions of existing corridors or cooperation with agencies in other states or in Canada.

=== Montreal to New York City ===
On October 6, 2005, the Albany Times-Union reported that New York Governor George Pataki and Quebec Premier Jean Charest "called for the creation of high-speed rail service between Montreal and New York City as a way to boost the regional economy during the third Quebec-New York Economic Summit on Wednesday," October 4, 2005. The article claimed that New York was Quebec's main trading partner, which perhaps explains some of the interest in linking the two major cities.

According to a report by the New York State Senate High Speed Rail Task Force, such a route would serve Plattsburgh via Albany.

=== Buffalo to Toronto ===
Former New York State Assemblyman Sam Hoyt of Buffalo had been active in promoting high-speed cross-border rail service. He maintained that a Toronto high-speed rail service had the potential to increase environmentally-friendly traffic and decrease congestion on the Peace Bridge. The existing passenger rail link is served by Amtrak and Via Rail.

=== Binghamton to New York City ===
Senator Charles Schumer and others have proposed passenger rail service from Binghamton, New York, along former Delaware, Lackawanna and Western Railroad trackage, via Scranton, PA and the Lackawanna Cutoff in New Jersey to New York City, which would provide the Southern Tier with intercity passenger rail for the first time in decades. The right-of-way from Binghamton to Scranton and along the Lackawanna Cutoff are suitable for high-speed service, although the rest of the route (which passes through the Pocono Mountains) is not, so it has sometimes been proposed to make the service high-speed where it is suitable. The route currently does not have rail service, although the Lackawanna Cutoff is in the process of having rail service restored. As of January 2010, Scranton, PA and Binghamton, NY did not win high-speed rail funding announced by President Obama. The only funded high-speed rail project in Pennsylvania is between Harrisburg and Philadelphia. However, construction on the cutoff at the New Jersey end of the cutoff began in late 2011.

This route would also require connection of the Binghamton line to the Empire Corridor to avoid a dead end, most likely through the existing New York, Susquehanna and Western Railway's northernmost branches to either Syracuse or Utica; the former Delaware, Lackawanna and Western Railroad line that connected the cutoff to Buffalo via a route through the Southern Tier and Finger Lakes is mostly abandoned. In any of these cases, the terrain is not favorable to high-speed rail service and would have to switch to conventional rail in this section.

=== Gateway Project ===
The Gateway Project is a proposal to build a high-speed rail right-of-way and to alleviate the bottleneck along the Northeast Corridor (NEC) between Penn Station in Newark, New Jersey, and New York Penn Station in Midtown Manhattan. The project would create routing alternatives and add 25 train scheduling slots to the current system used by Amtrak and New Jersey Transit by constructing another Hudson River crossing. Originally planned by Amtrak to come on line in 2030, Gateway was announced soon after cancellation of NJT's Access to the Region's Core (ARC) project in 2010. It remains unclear how engineering work, design, and real estate acquisition for ARC will be used for Gateway. In November 2011 U.S. Congress allotted $15 million for initial studies.

=== Other out-of-state connections ===
New high-speed routes through from Albany to Boston and Buffalo to Kansas City and/or Minneapolis through Cleveland are also proposed, most likely along the routes of current Amtrak services. Through service from Washington, D.C. to upstate New York via the Northeast Corridor is also proposed. These services would require heavy cooperation with other states and the United States federal government. Many civic and business leaders in New England have recently shown interest in better service to New York City and Boston.
