= Lake Champlain Seaway =

Canal project proposed in 19th century

This map of the Lake Champlain drainage basin shows the approximate route of the project.

The Lake Champlain Seaway was a canal project proposed in the late 19th century and considered as late as the 1960s to connect New York State's Hudson River and Quebec's St. Lawrence River with a deep-water canal. The objective was to allow easy ship traffic from New York City to Montreal through Lake Champlain, lowering transportation costs between the two cities.

Though supported by business groups in New York and Quebec, it proved economically unfeasible. Prohibitive costs (estimated at $100 million in 1900), opposition from railroads, and the diminishing utility of canal transportation prevented the project from advancing beyond the early planning stages. The Great Depression cut the project's planning budget, while World War II and completion of the St. Lawrence Seaway delayed matters. The growth of road and air transportation reduced the need for a canal, but the project was still under serious consideration as late as 1962.

As proposed, ships would have used a dredged channel in the Hudson River, transferred to an upgraded Champlain Canal, navigated Lake Champlain, traversed an upgraded Chambly Canal and St Ours Canal, and traveled a dredged route up the Richelieu River to Montreal. Today, the seaway's planned route is covered by the Lakes to Locks Passage.
