= Quebec-New York Economic Summit =

The Quebec-New York Economic Summit was a quasi-annual economic summit held between New York and Quebec. The bi-annual summits were called for in the Quebec-New York Corridor Agreement, signed in 2001 by the Plattsburgh-North Country Chamber of Commerce and the Federation of Chambers of Commerce of Quebec. This partnership was then embraced by the Quebec and New York State governments, creating a private-public partnership that endeavors to broaden and deepen economic connectivity between Quebec and New York, with a special focus on the bi-national corridor region from Quebec City and Montreal through Plattsburgh to Albany and New York City. The first Quebec-New York Economic Summit was conducted in Plattsburgh, New York in 2002 and was co-hosted by New York Governor George Pataki and Quebec Premier Bernard Landry. Subsequent summits were conducted in Montreal in 2004 and in Albany in 2004, co-hosted by Governor Pataki and Premier Jean Charest.

The Quebec-New York Corridor initiative, including the Economic Summits, involve a multi-faceted agenda, with projects and collaborations in transportation, border operations, economic development, technology, energy and tourism. A broad grassroots alliance known as the Quebec-New York Corridor Coalition is coordinated by the Plattsburgh-North Country Chamber of Commerce, facilitating and promoting various efforts between the bi-annual Summits.

"The third Summit," Premier Jean Charest was quoted as saying in a press release on the Governor's web site, "consolidates the gains made at the two previous Summits. It opens new perspectives and partnership opportunities, especially in core fields, such as high technology, transportation, energy and academic sectors, not to mention tourism. I am convinced the combined efforts of business people on both sides of the border will not only help create new jobs, but will also help us to shoulder our new, shared responsibility for continental security."

The Fourth Quebec-New York Economic Summit was scheduled for November 17, 2008 in Montreal. Its special theme was: "Quebec-New York: The Green Corridor". Special emphasis was placed on partnerships and collaborations connected with the emerging green economy and clean technologies. The Summit was co-hosted by New York State Governor David Paterson and Quebec Premier Jean Charest, and was co-organized by the Federation of Chambers of Commerce of Quebec and the Plattsburgh-North Country Chamber of Commerce.

== See also ==
- Quebec-New York Corridor (www.quebecnewyorkcorridor.com)
- Quebec Chamber Federation: Corridor Initiatives (www.corridors.ca)
- New York high-speed rail
